= St Trinian's (film) =

2007 British comedy film

- Theatrical release poster
- Directed by: Oliver Parker; Barnaby Thompson
- Screenplay by: Piers Ashworth; Nick Moorcroft
- Based on: St. Trinian's School by Ronald Searle
- Produced by: Oliver Parker; Barnaby Thompson
- Starring: Rupert Everett; Colin Firth; Lena Headey; Gemma Arterton; Jodie Whittaker; Russell Brand; Stephen Fry; Celia Imrie; Toby Jones; Talulah Riley; Mischa Barton
- Cinematography: Gavin Finney
- Edited by: Alex Mackie
- Music by: Charlie Mole
- Production companies: Ealing Studios; Fragile Films; UK Film Council
- Distributed by: Entertainment Film Distributors
- Release date: 21 December 2007
- Running time: 97 minutes
- Country: United Kingdom
- Language: English
- Budget: £7 million
- Box office: $29.1 million

St Trinian's is a 2007 British comedy film and the sixth in a long-running series of British films based on the works of cartoonist Ronald Searle and set in St Trinian's School. The first four films form a series, starting with The Belles of St. Trinian's in 1954, with sequels in 1957, 1960, 1966 and a reboot in 1980. The release in 2007, 27 years after the last entry and 53 years after the first film, is a rebooting of the franchise, rather than a direct sequel, with certain plot elements borrowed from the first film.

Whereas the earlier films concentrated on the adults, this film gives the school pupils greater prominence. St Trinian's is an anarchic school for uncontrollable girls run by eccentric headmistress Camilla Dagey Fritton (the reboot continues the tradition, established by Alastair Sim in the original film, of casting a male actor to play the female headmistress, with Rupert Everett inheriting the role).

St Trinian's received mixed reviews but was a commercial success.

== Plot ==
Annabelle Fritton unwillingly transfers to St Trinian's from the distinguished Cheltenham Ladies' College at the request of her father, Carnaby Fritton. She is taken around the school by Kelly Jones, the head girl, who introduces her to the various cliques within the school; Chavs, Posh Totty, Geeks, Emos and First Years.

Annabelle is harassed and pranked by the girls while in the shower and a video of her running around the school naked and wet is broadcast live on the internet. After a phone argument with her father she is drafted to the hockey team when she hits her phone with her hockey stick, smashing a statue. The girls of St Trinian's are involved in business with spiv Flash Harry, who pays them to make cheap vodka. Flash is attracted to Kelly, who initially turns him down. Meanwhile, Miss Dickinson joins the school as the new English teacher where she is immediately confronted with the school's anarchic system.

The Cheltenham Ladies' College hockey team arrive at St Trinian's, along with Education Minister Geoffrey Thwaites, who shares romantic history with the headmistress of St Trinian's, Camilla Fritton. Annabelle is forced to face her former bullies, including captain Verity Thwaites. The hockey match is violent, ending in Kelly shooting a winning goal for St Trinian's, and Annabelle begins to fit in with the other girls. As the match is being played, Thwaites inspects the school, finding the illegal vodka-making business and the chatline being run by the Posh Totty clique.

The following morning, a banker arrives at the school and serves Camilla with a foreclosure notice, as the school owes the bank in excess of £500,000 and has ignored six previous final demands. A subsequent meeting between Camilla and Carnaby is watched by the girls using hidden cameras, in which Carnaby confesses his distaste towards his daughter. Annabelle is left upset, despite Camilla defending her. Carnaby encourages Camilla to turn the school into a boutique hotel, which Camilla vehemently refuses.

Kelly and Flash work with the students to devise a plan to save the school. They must get into the final of School Challenge, a TV quiz show held in the National Gallery in London, as a cover for stealing Vermeer's Girl With a Pearl Earring. Chelsea, Peaches and Chloe, the Posh Totty clique, are chosen as the School Challenge Team. By cheating in every round, they make it to the grand final. During this, Annabelle integrates with her peers and is given a makeover. As the final is being filmed, Kelly, Taylor and Andrea plot to steal the painting, with help from the Geeks, Annabelle and Camilla herself.

During the final against Cheltenham Ladies' College, Thwaites suspects their cheating and cuts the microphone feeding the answers. However, Camilla inebriates Thwaites until he's unconscious and Annabelle incapacitates Verity. Chelsea, with the encouragement of Miss Dickinson, delivers the winning answer. Camilla helps Kelly, Taylor and Andrea escape with the painting as the school celebrates their victory. Camilla paints an exact copy of the painting and has Flash, posing as a German art dealer, sell it to Carnaby in a black market deal. The school then receives a further £50,000 reward for returning the real painting to the National Gallery. The loans are able to be repaid and the school is saved.

== Cast and characters ==
- Talulah Riley as Annabelle Fritton, a shy new student at St Trinian's after Carnaby, her father, dumps her there, and Camilla's niece
- Gemma Arterton as Kelly Jones, the resourceful Head Girl of St Trinian's
- Lily Cole as Polly, the Geek
- Juno Temple as Celia, the "Trustafarian" one
- Kathryn Drysdale as Taylor, the Chav
- Paloma Faith as Andrea, the Emo
- Tamsin Egerton as Chelsea, a Posh Totty
- Antonia Bernath as Chloe, a Posh Totty
- Amara Karan as Peaches, a Posh Totty
- Cloe and Holly Mackie as Tara & Tania, the Twins
- Caterina Murino as Miss Maupassant, the Foreign Languages Teacher
- Celia Imrie as Matron, of St Trinian's
- Jodie Whittaker as Beverly, the receptionist at St Trinian's
- Stephen Fry as Stephen Fry, the School Challenge presenter
- Toby Jones as Bursar, of St Trinian's
- Fenella Woolgar as Miss Cleaver, the Sports Teacher
- Anna Chancellor as Miss Bagstock, Cheltenham School's Headmistress
- Lucy Punch as Verity Thwaites, the Minister's daughter, and Cheltenham's school bully
- Lena Headey as Miss Dickinson, St Trinian's new English Teacher
- Mischa Barton as JJ French, the PR Guru, and previous Head Girl of St Trinian's
- Russell Brand as Flash, the spiv
- Rupert Everett as Camilla Fritton, St Trinian's Headmistress and Annabelle's aunt / Carnaby Fritton, Camilla's brother and Annabelle's father
- Colin Firth as Geoffrey Thwaites, the Education Minister
- Dolly as Mr Darcy
- Theo Cross as Art Teacher
- Tereza Srbova as Anoushka
- Steve Furst as Bank Manager

The members of Girls Aloud (Nicola Roberts, Kimberley Walsh, Sarah Harding, Nadine Coyle and Cheryl Cole) all make cameo appearances as the members of St Trinian's school band in the film. Zöe Salmon also makes a cameo as an emo girl, while Nathaniel Parker, the director's real life brother, makes a short appearance as the Chairman of the National Gallery. Newscaster Jeremy Thompson also briefly appears, as himself.

== Music ==
The film's score was composed by Charlie Mole.

=== Soundtrack ===
St. Trinian's

Soundtrack album by Various Artists
- Released: 10 December 2007
- Genre: Pop
- Label: Universal Music Group

Singles from St. Trinian's: The Soundtrack
- 1. "Theme to St. Trinian's" Released: 10 December 2007

Professional ratings
Review scores
Source	Rating
BBC Music	(negative)
Digital Spy	(positive)
InTheNews.co.uk	(3/10)

The film's soundtrack was released on 10 December 2007 via Universal Music Group. The album featured two original songs by British pop group Girls Aloud, including the single, "Theme to St. Trinian's". A music video for the song was released to promote the film and soundtrack.

The film's cast also recorded the theme, as well as a cover of Shampoo's "Trouble". A music video of the cast performing "Trouble" was also released. Rupert Everett and Colin Firth, who star in the film, recorded the John Paul Young song "Love Is in the Air". A number of popular singles or current album tracks by artists, such as Mark Ronson, Lily Allen, Noisettes, Gabriella Cilmi, and Sugababes, were included on the soundtrack.

Track listing

No.	Title	Artist(s)	Length
1.	"Theme to St. Trinian's"	Girls Aloud	4:29
2.	"Trouble"	Cast of St Trinian's	3:33
3.	"Oh My God"	Mark Ronson featuring Lily Allen	3:40
4.	"Love Is in the Air"	Rupert Everett and Colin Firth	3:50
5.	"Don't Give Up"	Noisettes	2:31
6.	"Nine2Five"	The Ordinary Boys vs. Lady Sovereign	3:04
7.	"If I Can't Dance"	Sophie Ellis-Bextor	3:24
8.	"Teenage Kicks"	Remi Nicole	2:27
9.	"Sanctuary"	Gabriella Cilmi	3:29
10.	"Love Is a Many-Splendored Thing"	The Four Aces	2:59
11.	"3 Spoons of Suga"	Sugababes	3:51
12.	"On My Way to Satisfaction"	Girls Aloud	4:06
13.	"The St Trinian's School Song"	Cast of St Trinian's	3:47

== Filming locations ==
- Park Place, Remenham, Berkshire, England (St Trinian's school)
- Ealing Studios, Ealing, London, England
- London, England
- Oxfordshire, England
- The National Gallery, London, England, (exteriors, The National Gallery)
- Trafalgar Square, St James's, London, England

== Release ==
St Trinian's premiered in London on 10 December 2007 and was theatrically released on 21 December 2007 by Entertainment Film Distributors.

=== Home media ===
St Trinian's was released on DVD on 14 April 2008 by Entertainment in Video.

== Reception ==
=== Box office ===
The film grossed £12,042,854 in the United Kingdom, surpassing its £7 million production budget. As of 18 July 2010 the film had grossed a worldwide total of $29,066,483.

=== Critical response ===
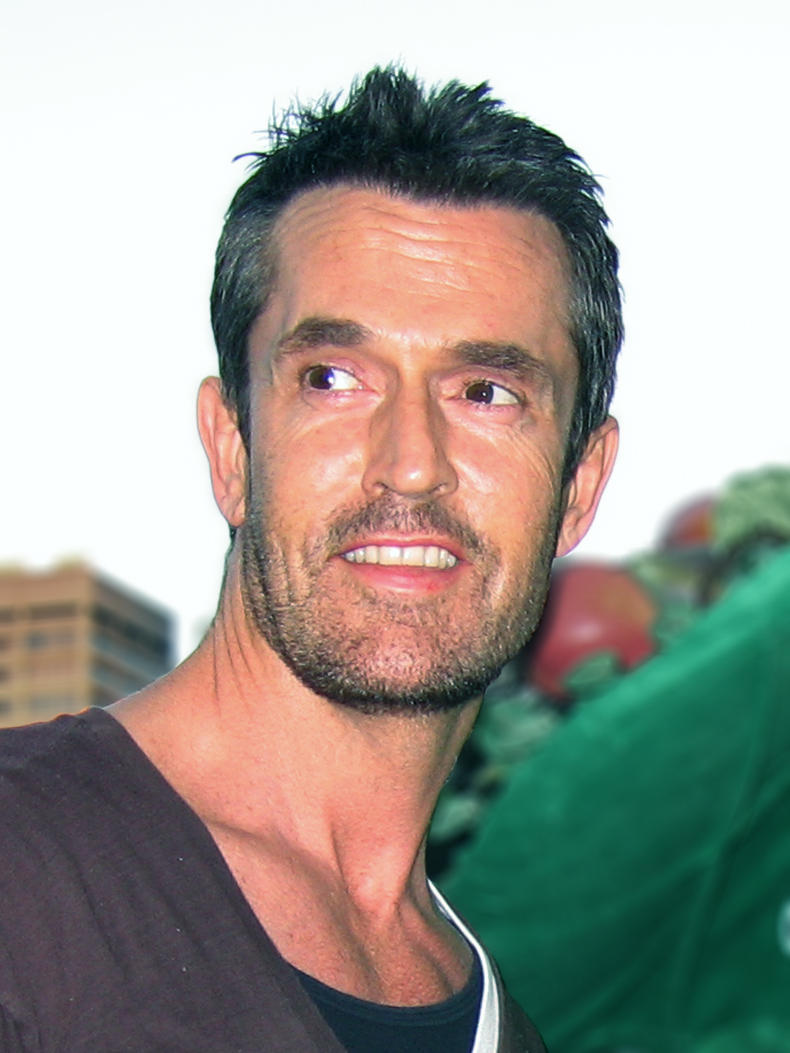
Rupert Everett was praised by critics for his performance.

St Trinian's received mixed reviews. Empire wrote that the film "fuse[s] an understanding of what made the originals great with a modern feel – the writers have fulfilled their end of the bargain, even tweaking some of the weaker points of the original story."

The Observer wrote that it "is raucous, leering, crude and, to my mind, largely misjudged, with Rupert Everett playing Miss Fritton as a coquettish transvestite with the manners of a Mayfair madam. The attempts to shock us fail, though Cheltenham Ladies College may well be affronted to hear one of its teachers say 'between you and I'. But the preview was packed with girls aged from seven to 14 who found it hilarious, and especially enjoyed Russell Brand."

Derek Malcolm, in The Evening Standard, wrote: "Structurally, the new movie is a mess, and it doesn't look too convincing either, with cinematography that uses all sorts of old-fashioned dodges to raise a laugh", and "when you look at it again, the old film was not only superior but rather more radical. This St Trinian's looks as if it is aiming at the lowest common denominator, and finding it too often."

On the film-critics aggregate website Rotten Tomatoes, St Trinian's holds a 32% positive rating, with the consensus "Both naughtier and campier than Ronald Searle's original postwar series, this St. Trinian's leans on high jinks instead of performances or witty dialogue."

=== Awards and nominations ===
Year	Award	Category	Nominee	Result
2007	Empire Award and National Movie Award	Best Comedy	St Trinian's	Nominated
2007	Empire Award and National Movie Award	Best Performance – Male	Colin Firth	Nominated
2007	Empire Award and National Movie Award	Best Performance – Male	Rupert Everett	Nominated
2007	Empire Award and National Movie Award	Best Performance – Female	Gemma Arterton	Nominated
2007	Empire Award and National Movie Award	Best Newcomer	Gemma Arterton	Nominated

== Sequel ==
It was announced at the 2008 Cannes Film Festival that the sequel, The Legend of Fritton's Gold, also directed by Parker and Thompson, would be released in 2009. Filming began on 6 July 2009, and on 7 July 2009, it was announced that David Tennant, Sarah Harding and Montserrat Lombard had all signed on to appear in the sequel.
