= St Trinnean's School =

Progressive girls' school

Coordinates: 55°56′24″N 3°10′16″W

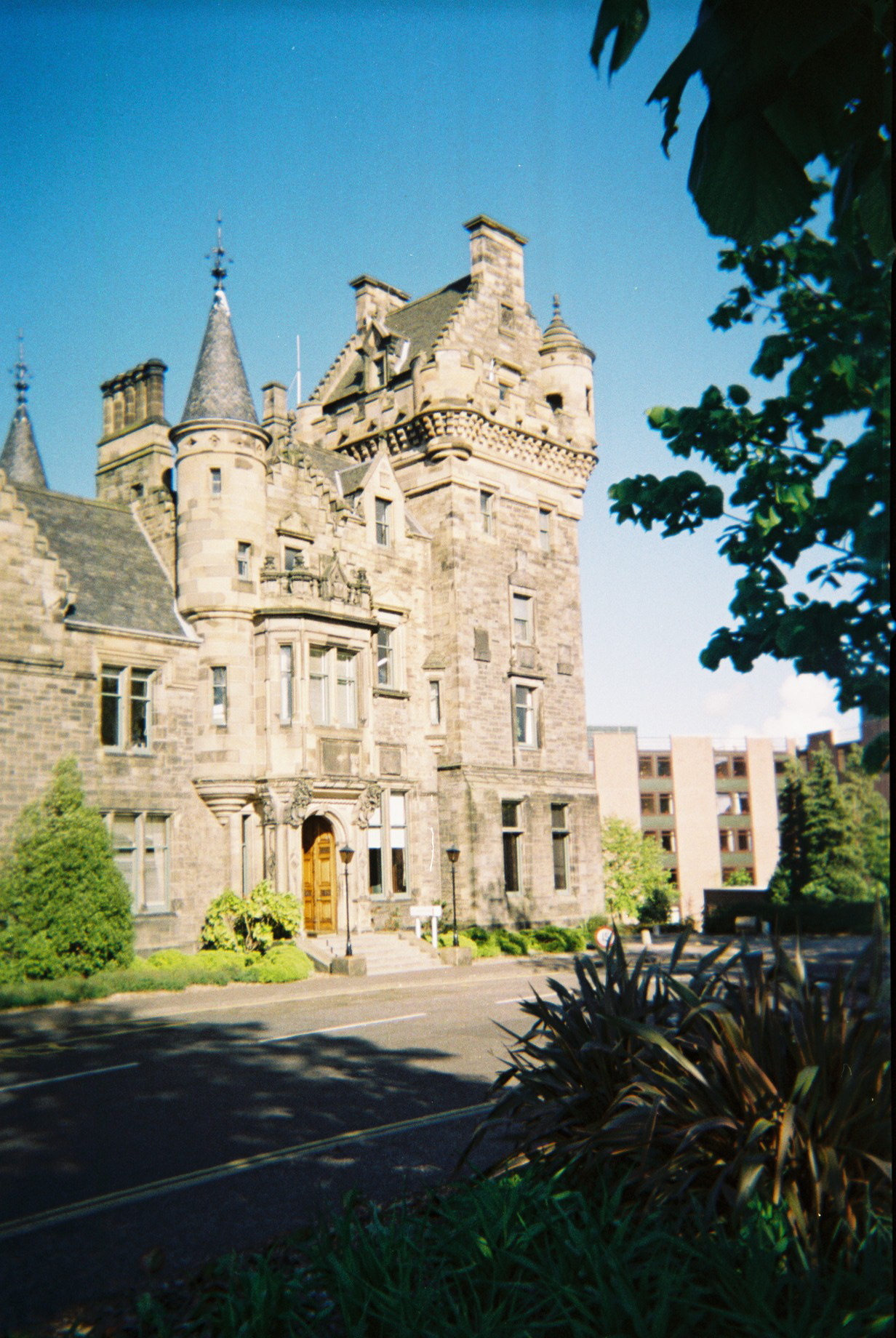
The mansion of St Leonard's which was built for Thomas Nelson and then used by the school until it was evacuated during WW2.

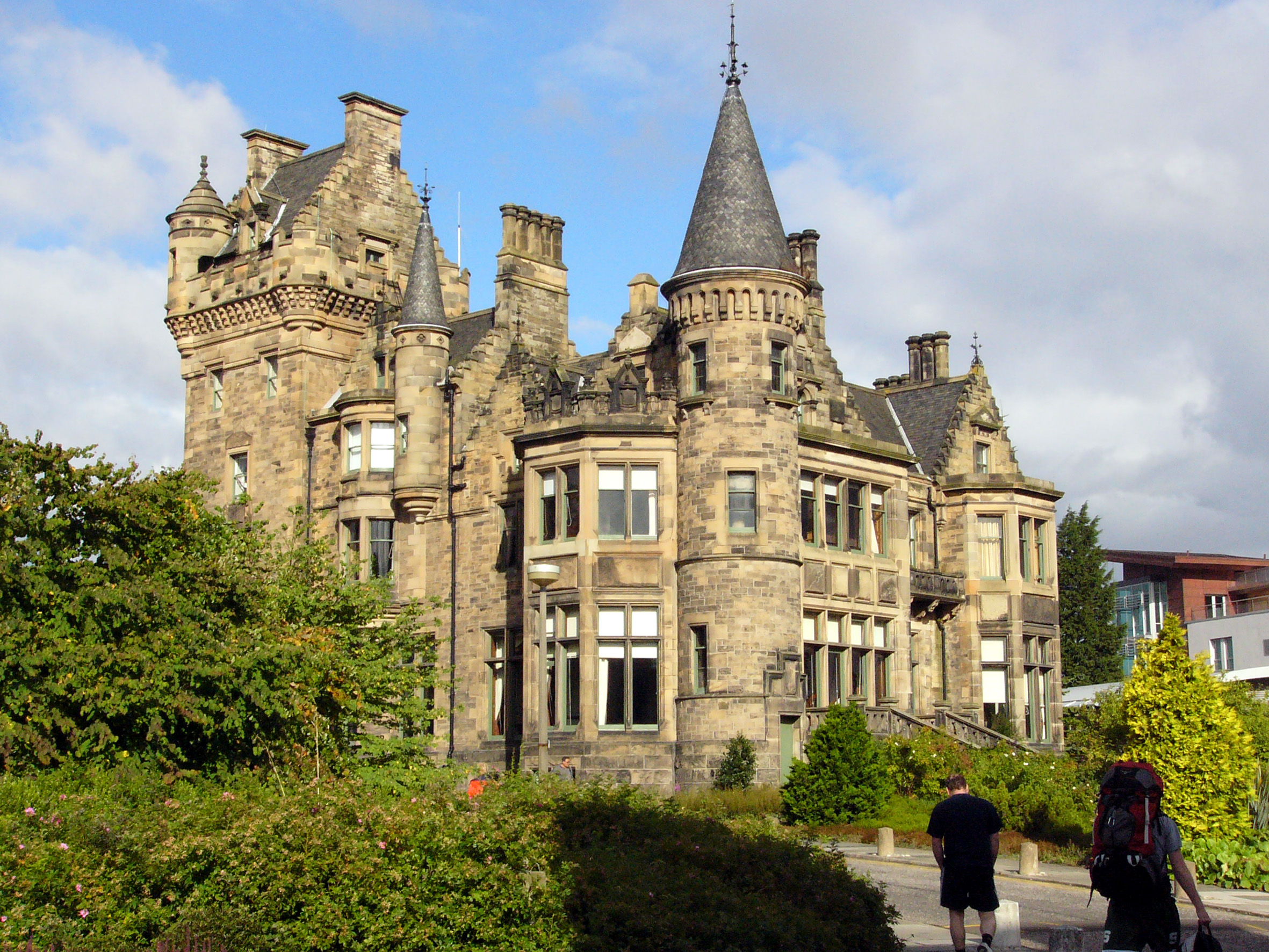
The rear of the school building, which is now used as a hall of residence by Edinburgh University

St Trinnean's was a progressive girls' school in Edinburgh.

It was founded in 1922 by its headmistress, Catherine Fraser Lee, who followed the Dalton Plan so that pupils could study what they wished and there was no homework. It was located at 10, Palmerston Road – the former home of Horatius Bonar – a minister and prodigious hymn writer. In 1925, it relocated to the grand mansion of St Leonard's Hall which had been built for the wealthy publisher, Thomas Nelson. In 1929, it had 122 day children and 38 boarders – pupils who lived at the school. When the Second World War broke out in 1939, the school evacuated to New Gala House – a mansion in Galashiels. Its pupils at that time included Jewish refugees of the Kindertransport. After the war, the school closed when Miss Fraser Lee retired in 1946.

The school uniform was a pale blue tunic with fawn-coloured stockings and coat of Harris Tweed. The school was named after Saint Ninian, who was also known as Trinnean. The pupils were divided into four houses, which were named after people and places associated with the saint – Clagrinnie, Kilninian, Monenn and Whithorn. Each pupil wore a tie in the colour of their house – Kilninian was green, for example.

Reunions of old pupils were held. When one was advertised in 1955, the name of the school was misprinted causing confusion with Ronald Searle's parody, St Trinian's School, which had been recently filmed as The Belles of St. Trinian's. The headmistress issued a denial that her girls were anything like those depicted by Searle. She was not happy with his portrayal, which had first appeared in 1946, when she told the school that, "After 20 years at St Trinneans, I am broken-hearted."

== Pupils ==
- Cecile McLachlan née Johnston, the artist who became friends with Ronald Searle as a girl and so inspired his creation of the fictional St Trinians
- Florence Bruce Steven, attended from 1925 to 1930 and left records of her time there to Edinburgh University
- Helen Lillie – "It was always freezing cold and coldness seemed to be regarded as an aid to learning ... Miss Fraser Lee was as implacable a dictator as any in Europe in the 1930s."
- Jean Innes, one of the first pupils – "School days at St Trinnean's really were the happiest of my life."
- Joan Campbell – the doctor and former head girl who organised a reunion of nearly 100 pupils in 1998
- Mair Eleri Morgan Livingstone née Thomas, who would climb from the school dormitory to the roof and, later, became a doctor and bacteriologist
- Margaret Hollister, daughter of American missionaries to China, who became a social worker in Washington, DC.
- Pauline Harrison, crystallographer
