= Wide boy =

British slang term

Wide boy is a British term for a man who lives by his wits, wheeling and dealing. According to the Oxford English Dictionary it is synonymous with spiv. The word "wide" used in this sense means wide-awake or sharp-witted. It applies to the wide-lapelled suits and broad ties, commonly called kippers, after the similarly broad fish. The term was used in a 1936 autobiography to describe criminal culture during the First World War (1914-1918). Newspapers of the late 1940s and 1950s often use both terms in the same article about the same person when dealing with ticket touts, fraudsters, and black market traders. It has become more generally used to describe a dishonest trader or a petty criminal who works by guile rather than force.

An early use of the term was in the 1933 film Friday the Thirteenth, where the character, played by Max Miller, a loud, quick-witted, Cockney market trader, is heard to say "I'm the widest boy ever put on a pair of shoes!"

The term came to public attention in 1937 with the publication of Wide Boys Never Work by Robert Westerby, a novel about gamblers and hustlers. During World War II such individuals became involved in the black market, but the term only began to appear in newspapers from 1947.

== Fictional portrayals ==
Fictional wheeler-dealer characters such as Del Boy from Only Fools and Horses, Frank Butcher from EastEnders, Private Walker from Dad's Army, Jim London from Up the Elephant and Round the Castle, Vincent Swan from White Gold, and Flash Harry from the St Trinian's films, all exemplify various wide boy "types". The term was used as the title for the 1952 film starring Sydney Tafler and Susan Shaw, Wide Boy.

== Musical references ==
The Kinks referred to the term in the lyrics to their song "Scum of the Earth" on their 1974 album Preservation: Act 2. This is an early usage of the term in a modern rock song. Kinks songwriter Ray Davies later used the term again in his song "Stand Up Comic".

In Richard Thompson's song "I Want to See the Bright Lights Tonight", on the album of the same name by Richard and Linda Thompson (1974), the lyrics include the line "The wide boys are all spoiling for a fight". When he performs the song live, Thompson often changes it to "big boys".

Ultravox released the song "Wide Boys" on their eponymous first LP in 1977. The 1970s rock band Foghat had a popular song "Wide Boy" on their 1981 Girls to Chat Boys to Bounce album, and Godley and Creme released a single of the same title in 1980 which was to start their careers in video direction. Kevin Mooney, formerly of Adam and the Ants, formed the short-lived band Wide Boy Awake in 1982 who disbanded after a couple of EPs. Nik Kershaw also released a single called "Wide Boy" in 1984, making Top Ten in the UK. Rick Lloyd's song of the same name was sung by Perry Cree for Sue Townsend's musical "The Ghost of Daniel Lambert"; this song was later covered by The Flying Pickets on their album Lost Boys in 1984, and also appeared in the 1977 television play Scum. Marillion released the song "Heart of Lothian", which includes a section called "Wide Boy," on the 1985 album Misplaced Childhood, in which the lyrics mention "wide boys, born with hearts of Lothian". The Tom Robinson Band referenced a "wide boy kicking in a window" as one of several examples of social unrest in their 1978 single "Up Against the Wall."

== Other usage ==
"Wide boys" is used humorously but now commonly to refer to wingers in Association, Gaelic or Rugby Football.

== See also ==
- Underground economy
- Teddy Boy
- Confidence trick
- Dave Courtney
