= Michael Smedley-Aston =

British film producer (1912–2006)

Edward Michael "Smed" Smedley-Aston (1912–2006), sometimes credited only as M. Smedley-Aston or E.M. Smedley-Aston, was a British film producer involved with over 40 feature films, and pioneering some of the earliest filmed TV series in the UK.

== Early life ==
Smedley-Aston was born on 25 August 1912, in Edgbaston, Birmingham, as the son of William Smedley-Aston (1868 - 1941), a Birmingham photographer and pioneer in the field of photography. He was educated at Marlborough College.

== Career ==
Smedley-Aston began his career at Elstree Studios, where he worked with Alfred Hitchcock and was assistant director on many films including Dance Band, Royal Cavalcade, Drake of England (all 1935) and Goodbye Mr. Chips (1939).

After World War II, he joined the Rank Organisation and worked on several films, notably David Lean's Great Expectations (1946). As a close associate of director/producers Frank Launder and Sidney Gilliat, Smedley-Aston was involved with the 1955 takeover of the British Lion Film Corporation, where he acted as a trouble-shooter and budget supervisor. Also in the 1950s, he worked on several high-profile US financed films, including Gentlemen Marry Brunettes (1955), The Million Pound Note (1954) and Sam Spiegel's Melba (1953).

As an independent producer he reunited the popular Crazy Gang for Life is a Circus (1957), and cast a young Sean Connery to join Lana Turner in Another Time, Another Place (1958). His two crime comedies, Two-Way Stretch (1960), and The Wrong Arm of the Law (1963) helped Peter Sellers on his way to Hollywood.

Smed was also involved in the early days of filmed episode TV. Assignment Foreign Legion (1957) was created as a vehicle for Merle Oberon and filmed at Beaconsfield Studios. He brought several episodes of Navy Log (1958) from its Hollywood base to European locations, and produced The Third Man series (1959–61).

== Personal life ==
During the Second World War Smedley-Aston served in the RAF. He retired to the Isle of Man in 1970, returning to London to produce two comedy films, Ooh... You Are Awful (1972) and The Wildcats of St. Trinian's (1980).

In 1935, he married Thora Quayle (b. 1913), who he met in the early days at Elstree Studios. They had one son, Brian, who followed also became a film editor and producer.
