= Blue Murder at St Trinian's =

- Original film poster by Ronald Searle
- Directed by: Frank Launder
- Written by: Frank Launder; Sidney Gilliat; Val Valentine
- Produced by: Frank Launder; Sidney Gilliat
- Starring: Terry-Thomas; George Cole; Joyce Grenfell; Lionel Jeffries; Alastair Sim; Richard Wattis; Lisa Gastoni; Sabrina
- Cinematography: Gerald Gibbs
- Edited by: Geoffrey Foot
- Music by: Malcolm Arnold
- Production companies: John Harvel Productions; Shepperton Film Studios
- Distributed by: British Lion Films (UK)
- Release date: December 1957 (UK)
- Running time: 86 minutes
- Country: United Kingdom
- Language: English

Blue Murder at St Trinian's is a 1957 British comedy film, directed by Frank Launder, co-written by Launder and Sidney Gilliat, and starring Terry-Thomas, George Cole, Joyce Grenfell, Lionel Jeffries and Richard Wattis. The film also includes a brief cameo of Alastair Sim, reprising his lead role in the 1954 film, The Belles of St. Trinian's. Inspired by the St Trinian's School comic strips by British cartoonist Ronald Searle, the film is the second entry in the St. Trinian's film series, with its plot seeing the students of the fictional school making plans to secure a place on a European tour, all while aiding a criminal who is secretly seeking to escape the country with stolen jewels.

The film received generally positive reviews from critics, with praise given to the evolution of the comedy following the first film. It was later succeeded by a sequel, The Pure Hell of St Trinian's, in 1960.

== Plot ==
At St. Trinian's, with headmistress Amelia Fritton and its teachers gone, the students run wild, prompting the Ministry of Education to keep them under control with help from the army. In the meantime, the school's business associate Flash Harry sets up a marriage bureau for the sixth form girls, hoping to marry one of them to Prince Bruno. As the prince will only make a decision if the girls are brought to him before July, Harry decides to take advantage of a UNESCO offer to the British government, which will provide an expenses paid tour of various European cities that will end in Rome. To ensure the school is picked, some of the sixth form students break into the Ministry and replace their file, containing negative feedback from inspectors, with one that casts the school in a positive light.

Shortly after the break-in, Harry and the pupils discover that the Ministry is sending in a new headmistress recruited from Australia, Dame Maud Hackshaw, who they suspect will withdraw their nomination. On the night she is due to arrive, Harry is surprised when one of the sixth form girls, Myrna Mangan, reveals that her father Joe has turned up needing help. Discovering that the local police are searching for him, under orders by Superintendent Kemp-Bird, Harry and Myrna decide to disguise him as Hackshaw, with the students abducting the real Hackshaw and imprisoning her in the school. In the meantime, a forged letter from Hackshaw is sent to the Ministry, advising them to let the girls go on the UNESCO tour. With no choice, they decide to grant the request, and seeks volunteers to chaperone the girls and act as interpreters.

Superintendent Kemp-Bird, who is berated for his failure to find Mangan – as he is wanted for a jewellery robbery in London – receives word from the Ministry about St. Trinian's plans. He decides to assign Sergeant Ruby Gates to go undercover as an interpreter, while advising the Ministry to secure coaches from a company belonging to Captain Romney Carlton-Ricketts, as its the only coach company that will transport the students mainly out of desperation. As the students prepare to depart, Mangan finds he must remain in disguise and accompany the girls on their tour. Because he still is in possession of the stolen jewels he took, he finds himself forced to hide them in a water polo ball, unaware that a sixth form student witnesses this.

The girls soon cause chaos when visiting the cities on the tour, including Paris and Vienna. During this time, Romney makes a play for Gates due to her cover story, but as they reach Rome, she admits the truth to him, revealing that she has discovered Mangan amongst the students. When the girls prepare to play a water polo match before Bruno, chaos ensues when Mangan loses the ball containing the jewels, and is forced to steal it back. As he escapes with it, he is pursued by the fourth form students, who capture him at the Coliseum. As Prince Bruno announces his plans to marry Myrna, much to the annoyance of one of her sixth form classmates, St. Trinian's is given the reward for Mangan's capture, which Miss Fritton keeps for herself and the school upon her return. Meanwhile, Gates, now back in England, parts way with Romney to be with Kemp-Bird, who was demoted to the ranks after causing embarrassment for his superiors for attempting to arrest Hackshaw.

== Cast ==
- George Cole as "Flash Harry"
- Joyce Grenfell as Policewoman Sergeant Ruby Gates
- Terry-Thomas as Captain Romney Carlton-Ricketts
- Lloyd Lamble as Superintendent Kemp-Bird
- Terry Scott as Police Sergeant
- Lionel Jeffries as Joe Mangan
- Thorley Walters as Major Whitehart
- Cyril Chamberlain as Army Captain
- Judith Furse as Dame Maud Hackshaw
- Kenneth Griffith as Charlie Bull
- Alastair Sim as Miss Amelia Fritton
- Guido Lorraine as Prince Bruno
- Charles Lloyd Pack as Prison Governor
- Alma Taylor as Prince Bruno's mother

Sixth Form

- Lisa Gastoni as Myrna Mangan
- Rosalind Knight as Annabel
- Dilys Laye as Bridget Strong
- José Read as Cynthia
- Pat Laurence as Mavis
- Sabrina as Virginia Fritton

Ministry of Education

- Richard Wattis as Manton Bassett
- Eric Barker as Culpepper Brown
- Peter Jones as Prestwick
- Michael Ripper as Eric the liftman

== Production ==
As Miss Fritton, Alastair Sim appears in only two scenes.

A leading model at the time, Sabrina got high billing, appearing in all the posters and publicity stills in school uniform, but she actually had a non-speaking part in which she was only required to lounge in bed reading a book, while policemen hover, "searching" around her. She is described as the "school swot", the only pupil to go to bed on time and where she reads the works of Dostoyevsky.

Thorley Walters was to re-appear in The Pure Hell of St Trinian's, effectively replacing Richard Wattis as Culpepper-Brown's nerve-racked assistant. He was also to play the part of Culpepper-Brown himself in The Wildcats of St Trinian's in 1980.

It was Rosalind Knight's first credited film role. She too later appeared in The Wildcats film, this time as a teacher.

== Box office ==
Kinematograph Weekly listed it as being "in the money" at the British box office in 1958.

== Critical reception ==
Bosley Crowther wrote in The New York Times, "what is important and delightful is that the spirit of knockabout farce, evolved in "The Belles of St. Trinian's," is retained uninhibited in this film...it is wild but generally funny—explosively funny in spots, especially when that fellow Terry-Thomas, who was the mustachioed major in "Private's Progress," is dragooned as a bus driver to transport the girls to Rome. And since he has toothy Joyce Grenfell to accompany him on the trip—she's "a crazy, mixed-up police-woman," as she dubs herself—the fun is as much in their behavior as it is in that of the belles. None of the latter is notable as an actress; all are lissome and lively girls. They make for pleasant company on a mad excursion. It's only too bad that Mr. Sim had to languish in jail."

David McGillivray noted in Time Out, "Inventive situations utilising a classic British blend of comedy and crime make it the best (if you like this sort of thing) in the series which followed The Belles of St Trinian's."
