= Flash Harry =

Flash Harry may refer to:

- Flash Harry (album), by Harry Nilsson (1980)
- Flash Harry (St Trinian's), a fictional character from the St Trinian's film series
- Flash Harry, a musical side project of Barnaby Weir from The Black Seeds
- Malcolm Sargent (1895-1967), English conductor (nickname)
