= Spiv =

Petty criminal

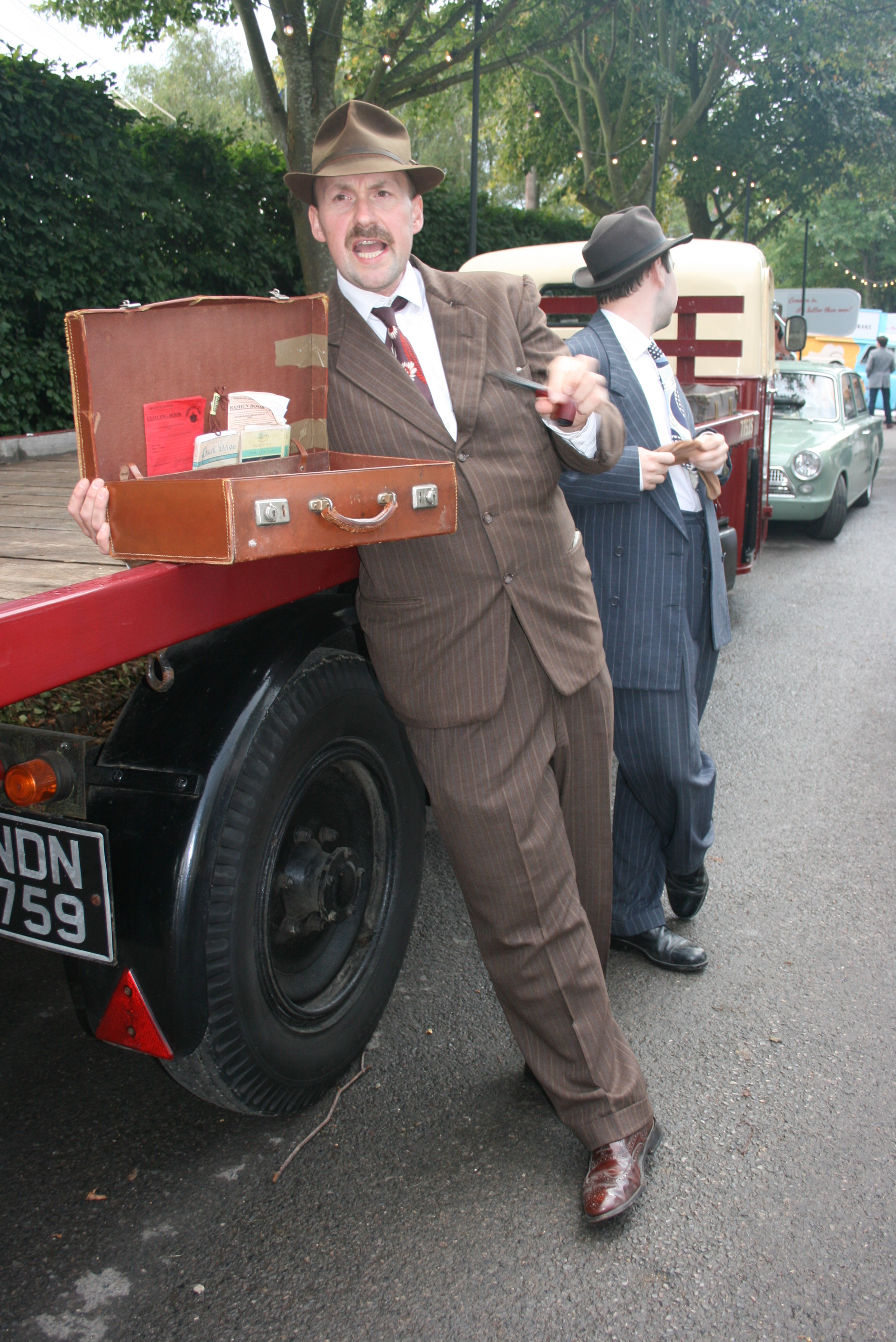
An actor performing the role of a spiv selling goods "from the back of a lorry" at a 2011 historical re-enactment, complete with a look-out watching for the law

A spiv is a petty criminal in the United Kingdom who deals in illicit, typically black market, goods. Spivs were particularly active during the Second World War and in the post-war period when many goods were rationed due to shortages.

According to Peter Wollen, "the crucial difference between the spiv and the classic Hollywood gangster was the degree of sympathy the spiv gained as an intermediary in the transfer of black market goods to ... a grateful mass of consumers."

== Origins ==
The origin of the word is obscure. "Spiv" was the nickname of Henry Bagster, an early 1900s small-time London crook who was frequently arrested for illegal street trading and confidence tricks. National newspapers reported his court appearances between 1903 and 1906 and his nickname from 1904.

The term spiv first appeared in print in a non-fiction crime paperback (C. G. Gordon's Crooks of Underworld) in a horseracing context in 1929.

The word was popularised by Bill Naughton in a September 1945 News Chronicle article, "Meet the Spiv".

Eric Partridge also echoes usage as racecourse slang that had become widely accepted in its contemporary context by 1950.

The Oxford English Dictionary states that it may come from:

- spiffy, meaning smartly dressed;
- spiff, a bonus for salespeople (especially drapers but later car salesmen etc.) for managing to sell excess or out of fashion stock. The seller might offer a discount, by splitting his commission with the customer. A seller of stolen goods could give this explanation for a bargain price.

Other suggestions have been made, most commonly noting that spiv is also a Romani word for a sparrow, implying the person is a petty criminal rather than a serious "villain" or that it is an American police acronym for Suspicious Person Itinerant Vagrant, though this is an unlikely formation and is probably a backronym. It has also been suggested that Spiv "is simply V.I.P.s backward, with the meaning also reversed".

== Look ==
The spiv had a characteristic look which has been described as "A duck's arse haircut, Clark Gable moustache, rakish trilby [hat], drape-shape jacket, and loud garish tie ... [which] all represented a deliberate snook cocked at wartime austerity."

The comedian Arthur English had a successful career immediately after the Second World War appearing as a spiv with a pencil moustache, wide-brimmed hat, light-coloured suit and a large bright patterned tie.

== In popular culture ==
=== Spiv cycle films ===
A series of British crime films produced between 1945 and 1950, during the time that rationing was still in effect, dealt with the black market and related underworld, and have been termed spiv movies or the spiv cycle by critics. Examples are Brighton Rock and Night and the City, in which the spiv is a main character. Other crime films which have been cited as part of the spiv cycle – though not always featuring a spiv character, just criminal dealings – are They Made Me a Fugitive, It Always Rains on Sunday, Odd Man Out, No Way Back, The Third Man and Waterloo Road.

=== Other appearances ===
- John Worby (1937) The other half; the autobiography of a spiv, and its 1939 sequel, Spiv’s progress, both non-fiction books.
- The image of the spiv was used for the character Flash Harry played by George Cole in the film The Belles of St Trinian's (1954) and subsequent St Trinian's films, also played by Russell Brand in the 2007 reboot.
- The British television series Minder (1979–1994) featured George Cole in the role of Arthur Daley, an ageing spiv with an unseen wife ("her indoors"), a used-car business, and a bodyguard (minder) played by Dennis Waterman.
- The character Private Joe Walker, played by James Beck, in the 1968-1977 TV series Dad's Army is a spiv.
- The character Swinburne (played by Bruce Forsyth) in the film Bedknobs and Broomsticks – set in London during the Second World War – has a similar appearance, and offers to sell from a selection of watches which are pinned inside his coat.
- Another example of a spiv in children's fiction is Johnny Sharp in the novel The Otterbury Incident (1948) by Cecil Day-Lewis.
- In Easy Money (1948), Greta Gynt sings the song, “The Shady Lady Spiv”.
- In Agatha Christie's 1952 play, The Mousetrap, the mysterious character of Mr. Paravicini is referred to as a spiv. He arrives unexpectedly at Monkswell Manor, a guesthouse that is the setting for the play, with only one small suitcase.
- In a song from The Kinks' album Muswell Hillbillies (1971), called "Holloway Jail", the narrator is visiting his beloved in that famous London lock-up. He says "she was young and ever so pretty", but "a spiv named Frankie Shine" led her into a life of crime.
- In The Kinks' rock opera Preservation: Acts 1 & 2 (1973–74), Ray Davies states that his character "Flash", at that point leader of the Government, had started out as a spiv in the song "Second Hand Car Spiv".
- English singer-songwriter Joe Jackson based elements of his early public persona on that of the spiv, and labelled his own music as "spiv rock". His use of spiv imagery is particularly evident on the cover of his second album, I'm the Man.
- Box for One (1949) is a television play about a spiv.
- In the music video for The Kinks' song "Come Dancing", Ray Davies stars as a spiv.
- The character of Mike The Cool Person from the TV comedy The Young Ones is a portrayal of a spiv.
- In the PlayStation game MediEvil 2, the player can buy items from The Spiv.
- The second episode of the Adam Curtis documentary The Mayfair Set is titled "Entrepreneur Spelt S.P.I.V."

== See also ==
- Fartsovka
- Gombeen man
- Wide boy
