= The Belles of St. Lemons =

Comic strip characters from The Beano

- Characters from The Beano

Publication information
- Stars of: The Belles of St. Lemons
- Author(s): Uncredited
- Illustrator(s): Gordon Bell
- First appearance: Issue 1495; (13 March 1971)
- Last appearance: Issue 1552 (15 April 1972)
- Current status: Weekly; discontinued

Characters
- Type of group: School clique
- Members of group: Curli, Dizzi, Dozi, Dumpling, Kooki, Mina, Piggi, Poni, Prune, Swotti, Blondie, Suzie
- Other characters: The Belles, Miss Clump, Puddy

The Belles of St. Lemons was a British comic strip in the UK comic The Beano, first appearing in issue 1495, although the characters themselves had first been introduced in the 1968 edition of The Beano Annual. It was drawn by Gordon Bell and ran from 1971 to 1972.

The title of the series was both a play on the nursery rhyme "Oranges and Lemons" and Ronald Searle's Belles of St. Trinians cartoons.

== Overview ==
St. Lemons was essentially the girls' boarding-school equivalent of The Bash Street Kids – the "belles" all conforming to comic stereotypes (the fat one, the unintelligent one, the leader etc.). The headmistress of the school was Miss Clump (originally Miss Phit in the annuals). The weekly strip ended around 1972, although further episodes continued to appear in The Beano Annuals.

== Characters ==
The Belles were:

- Curli – The one who had hair curlers in her hair, and was fond of knitting. She is revealed in the annuals to have a close friendship with Spotty of The Bash Street Kids.
- Dizzi – The ugly one, similar to Plug of The Bash Street Kids.
- Dozi – The sleepy one.
- Dumpling – The fat one, similar to Fatty of The Bash Street Kids.
- Kooki – The one who was fond of cooking.
- Mina – Didn't speak much, but had a myna bird on her head that would do most of the talking for her.
- Piggi – The one with many spots, similar to Spotty of The Bash Street Kids.
- Poni – The one who had a pony.
- Prune – The leader of the group, filling the role of Danny from The Bash Street Kids.
- Swotti – The clever one – seemingly a mixture of 'Erbert and Cuthbert, two characters from The Bash Street Kids strips.
- Blondie – The blonde one.
- Suzie – One of the Belles, apparently an ordinary girl.
- Puddy – A black, tomboy tabby-cat who serves as the school mascot. To an extent, she filled the role occupied by Winston in The Bash Street Kids strips.

Other characters featured in the strips included the rival St. Sniffles School (similar to Posh Street School, a rival of Bash Street School), and occasional cameos from The Bash Street Kids themselves.
