= The Intruder (1953 film) =

1953 British film by Guy Hamilton

- Theatrical release poster
- Directed by: Guy Hamilton
- Written by: John Hunter; Robin Maugham; Anthony Squire
- Produced by: Ivan Foxwell
- Starring: Jack Hawkins; George Cole; Dennis Price; Michael Medwin
- Cinematography: Edward Scaife
- Music by: Francis Chagrin
- Distributed by: British Lion Films
- Release date: 19 October 1953
- Running time: 84 minutes
- Country: United Kingdom
- Language: English
- Box office: £161,488 (UK)

The Intruder is a 1953 British drama film directed by Guy Hamilton and starring Jack Hawkins, George Cole, Dennis Price and Michael Medwin. The screenplay is by Robin Maugham and John Hunter, based on Maugham's 1949 novel Line on Ginger.

== Plot ==
Ex-Colonel, now stockbroker, Wolf Merton returns home one evening to find it being burgled by an armed intruder. Merton recognises the culprit, Ginger Edwards, as a former soldier who had fought courageously under his command in a tank regiment during the Second World War. Merton briefly questions Edwards on how he got into a life of crime, but, suspecting Merton has called the police, the burglar makes his escape. Merton sets out to discover why one of his best men became involved in crime after he was de-mobbed. The story unfolds in a sequence of flash-back episodes of events during the war and how they affected, or contrasted with, how each of the main characters fared when they returned to civilian life.

== Cast ==
- Jack Hawkins as Wolf Merton
- George Cole as John Summers
- Dennis Price as Leonard Pirry
- Michael Medwin as Ginger Edwards
- Duncan Lamont as Donald Cope
- Arthur Howard as Bertram Slake
- Nicholas Phipps as Captain Fetherstonhaugh
- Dora Bryan as Dora Bee
- Edward Chapman as Walter Lowden
- Susan Shaw as Tina
- Harold Lang as Bill
- George Baker as Adjutant
- Patrick Barr as Inspector Williams
- Michael Ripper as mechanic
- Marc Sheldon as Astley
- Campbell Singer as War Office Records Sergeant
- Peter Martyn as sentry
- Robert Adair as Luigi
- Richard Wattis as schoolmaster
- Gene Anderson as June Maple
- David Horne as General
- Charles Lamb as glazier (uncredited)
- Leonard Sharp as glazier (uncredited)

== Production ==
Post-war London is the backdrop including Belgravia, Covent Garden market, Loughborough Junction and Dulwich Hospital.

== Soundtrack ==
The soundtrack was composed by Francis Chagrin, conducted by Muir Mathieson. He later adapted the music for concert use as the Four Orchestral Episodes.

== Critical reception ==
In a contemporary review the Daily Telegraph commented that the film treated the subject "with intelligence, taste, and a feeling for the medium", adding "Medwin ... gives a brilliant study of a good fellow gone wrong".

The Monthly Film Bulletin wrote: "It is refreshing to find a film which tries to deal realistically with contemporary problems, and yet does not degenerate into a dull lecture. ... There are few box-office concessions – the ending is far from happy, and love interest slight. The pace is maintained, and the reconstructed war scenes are handled with imagination, building up a series of exciting moments ... The Intruder is the second film to be directed by Guy Hamilton ... it indicates an expert talent, technically very assured, if at times a trifle inclined to the showy effect."

The Radio Times Guide to Films gave the film 3/5 stars, writing: "An intriguing idea ... is played out mechanically by director Guy Hamilton, but performed with some force by officer Jack Hawkins. ... Hamilton was still honing his craft here, but he went on to be a fine action director."

In British Sound Films: The Studio Years 1928–1959 David Quinlan rated the film as "very good", writing: "Solid, thoughtful drama works well both in its war flashbacks and as social conscience thriller."

== Video Release ==
In 2020 Network Distributing Limited released the film on Blu-ray.
