= George Cole (actor) =

English actor (1925–2015)

George Cole OBE
- Cole with Rona Anderson in the 1951 film Scrooge
- Born: George Edward Cole; 22 April 1925; Tooting, London, England
- Died: 5 August 2015 (aged 90); Reading, Berkshire, England
- Resting place: Reading Cemetery and Crematorium, Reading, England
- Occupation: Actor
- Years active: 1940–2008
- Spouses: Eileen Moore (m. 1954; div. 1962) Penny Morrell (m. 1967)
- Children: 4, including Cris

George Edward Cole (22 April 1925 – 5 August 2015) was an English actor whose career spanned 75 years. He was best known for playing Arthur Daley in the long-running ITV comedy-drama show Minder and Flash Harry in the early St Trinian's films.

== Early life ==
Cole was born in Tooting, South London. He was placed for adoption at ten days old, and adopted by George and Florence Cole. They lived in Tooting, moving five miles away to a council flat in Morden when Cole was five years old. The senior George suffered from epilepsy, a double hernia, and the after-effects of gas poisoning during the First World War. He had several jobs which were curtailed by his ill-health, including pulling a heavy roller for Wandsworth Council. In Cole's opinion, the exertion contributed to his father's death.

Cole attended secondary school in nearby Morden. He left school at 14 to be a butcher's boy and had an ambition to join the Merchant Navy, but landed a part in a touring musical and chose acting as a career. He recalled that he was in Dublin on the day of Britain's entry into the Second World War, and witnessed an effigy of Neville Chamberlain being publicly burned without interference from the police.

== Career ==
Aged 15, Cole was cast in the film Cottage to Let (1941) opposite Scottish actor Alastair Sim. Sim liked Cole, and agreed with his family to take in Cole and his mother to their home. Acting as his mentor, Sim helped Cole lose his Cockney accent; Cole stayed with the Sim family until he was 27. He later attributed his career success to Sim, with whom he appeared in a total of 11 films, ending with a filmed version for television of The Anatomist (1956), from the play by James Bridie.

Cole also acted opposite Laurence Olivier in The Demi-Paradise (1943) and Olivier's film version of Henry V (1944), of which he was the last surviving cast member. Cole's career was interrupted by his national service in the Royal Air Force from 1944 to 1947, where he was temporarily a radio operator.

Returning to his acting career, he became familiar to audiences in British comedy films in the 1950s. Cole appeared with Alastair Sim in Scrooge (as the young Scrooge) in 1951, including a scene with fellow actor Patrick Macnee who played the young Jacob Marley. His best known film role was as "Flash Harry" in the St Trinian's films, and in the comedy Too Many Crooks (1959). He starred in the film Take Me High (1973) alongside Cliff Richard and Deborah Watling.

Cole was known for his lead role in the radio comedy A Life of Bliss (1953–69), in which he played an amiable but bumbling bachelor, David Alexander Bliss, initially played by David Tomlinson. It lasted for six series and 118 episodes. It became a TV series in 1960, running for two series, but no recordings of the TV episodes are known to survive.

The Scarecrow of Romney Marsh (1963) is a three-part serial which formed part of the Walt Disney's Wonderful World of Color TV series. It was shot on location in Kent and stars Patrick McGoohan as Doctor Syn, with Cole as Mipps.

In 1964, Cole guest-starred as 'Bishop', an increasingly deranged arsonist, in the episode "Firebug" in the ITV series Gideon's Way. In 1968, he starred as Max Osborne in the TV series A Man of Our Times.

Cole appeared as a guest role in the Gerry Anderson produced television series UFO in the episode "Flight Path" (1971), and he appeared as a storyteller on the BBC children's programme Jackanory, narrating in six episodes between 1969 and 1971. He made a guest appearance as Mr Downs, a bank manager, in a 1978 episode of the sitcom The Good Life, performed in the presence of Queen Elizabeth II.

His best-remembered television role was as the crafty wheeler-dealer Arthur Daley in the popular and successful Thames Television series Minder, which he played from 1979 to the show's conclusion in 1994. Prior to this, he had played a struggling writer in the BBC sitcom Don't Forget to Write! (1977–79). Although he is most associated with the character of Arthur Daley, it was one which produced mixed emotions in him, describing variously his support for the character as well as citing in his autobiography how much he loathed the type of person Daley was.

Cole played Sir Giles Lynchwood in the BBC's adaptation of the Tom Sharpe novel Blott on the Landscape (1985). Cole starred in a number of comedies, such as The Bounder (1982–83), Comrade Dad (1984–86), Dad (1997–99) and My Good Friend (1995–96).

Cole appeared in a New Tricks (BBC), series 4 Episode 5 "Powerhouse" (2007) and the Midsomer Murders episode "Shot at Dawn" (2008).

== Personal life ==
Cole was married twice, first to actress Eileen Moore (b. 1932) from 1954 until 1962 (when they divorced), and then to actress Penny Morrell from 1967 until his death. Cole had four children, two from each marriage. His son from his first marriage, Cris Cole, is a screenwriter for film and television.

He was invested as an Officer of the Order of the British Empire (OBE) in 1992. He resided for over 70 years in Stoke Row, Oxfordshire. His autobiography The World Was My Lobster, a phrase taken from an episode of Minder that made George smile, was published in 2013.

=== Death ===
On 5 August 2015, Cole died from pneumonia and sepsis at the Royal Berkshire Hospital in Reading, Berkshire, aged 90. His funeral took place at Reading Crematorium on 13 August. The Minder theme song was played and Cole's Minder co-star Dennis Waterman gave a eulogy.

== Partial filmography ==
- Cottage to Let (1941) – Ronald
- Those Kids from Town (1942) – Charlie
- The Demi-Paradise (1943) – Percy (uncredited)
- Henry V (1944) – Boy
- Journey Together (1945) – Curley, Bomb Aimer, Lancaster Crew
- My Brother's Keeper (1948) – Willie Stannard
- Quartet (1948) – Herbert Sunbury (segment "The Kite")
- The Spider and the Fly (1949) – Marc, detective
- Morning Departure (1950) – E.R.A. Marks
- The Happiest Days of Your Life (1950) – Junior Assistant Caretaker at Ministry of Education (uncredited)
- Gone to Earth (US: The Wild Heart, 1950) – Cousin Albert
- Flesh and Blood (1951) – John Hannah
- Laughter in Paradise (1951) – Herbert Russell
- Lady Godiva Rides Again (1951) – Johnny
- Scrooge (1951) – Young Ebenezer Scrooge
- The Happy Family (1952) – Cyril
- Who Goes There! (1952) – Arthur Crisp
- Top Secret (1952) – George
- Folly to Be Wise (1953) – Soldier in Brains Trust audience (uncredited)
- Will Any Gentleman...? (1953) – Henry Sterling
- The Intruder (1953) – John Summers
- The Clue of the Missing Ape (1953) – Gobo
- Our Girl Friday (1953) – Jimmy Carrol
- An Inspector Calls (1954) – Tram Conductor (uncredited)
- Happy Ever After (1954) – Terence
- The Belles of St. Trinian's (1954) – Flash Harry
- A Prize of Gold (1955) – Sergeant Roger Morris
- Where There's a Will (1955) – Fred Slater
- The Constant Husband (1955) – Luigi Sopranelli
- The Adventures of Quentin Durward (1955) – Hayraddin
- It's a Wonderful World (1956) – Ken Millar
- The Weapon (1956) – Joshua Henry
- The Green Man (1956) – William Blake
- Blue Murder at St Trinian's (1957) – Flash Harry
- Too Many Crooks (1959) – Fingers
- The Bridal Path (1959) – Police Sergeant Bruce
- Don't Panic Chaps! (1959) – Finch
- The Pure Hell of St Trinian's (1960) – Flash Harry Cuthbert Edwards
- Cleopatra (1963) – Flavius
- Dr. Syn, Alias the Scarecrow (1963) – Mr Sexton Mipps / Hellspite
- One Way Pendulum (1964) – Defence Counsel / Fred
- Gideon's Way, episode "The Firebug" (1964) – Arsonist / Bishop
- The Great St. Trinian's Train Robbery (1966) – Flash Harry
- The Caramel Crisis (1966) – Caramel
- The Vampire Lovers (1970) – Roger Morton
- UFO (episode 15 – Flight Path) (1971, TV series)
- Fright (1971) – Jim
- Take Me High (1973) – Bert Jackson
- The Blue Bird (1976) – Tylo
- The Sweeney (1976) – Dennis Longfield
- Don't Forget to Write! (1977–1979, TV series) – George Maple
- Minder (1979–1994, TV series) – Arthur Daley
- The Bounder (1982–1983, TV series) – Trevor Mountjoy
- Minder on the Orient Express (TV 1985) – Arthur Daley
- An Officer and a Car Salesman (Minder spin- off) (1988, TV series) – Arthur Daley
- Blott on the Landscape (1985, TV series) – Sir Giles Lynchwood / Sir Giles
- Comrade Dad (1986, TV series) – Reg Dudgeon
- Tube Mice (1988, TV series) – Vernon (Voice)
- Root Into Europe (1992, TV series) – Henry Root
- My Good Friend (1995–1996, TV series) – Peter Banks
- Mary Reilly (1996) – Mr Poole
- Dad (1997–1999, TV series) – Brian Hook
- The Ghost of Greville Lodge (2000) – Great Uncle
- Heartbeat (2005–2008, TV series) – Albert Hallows (final appearance)
- Marple (2007) – Laurence Raeburn
- New Tricks (2007) – Sir Edward Chambers
- Midsomer Murders (2008) – Lionel Hicks

George Cole is often mistakenly credited with performing in the American films Gone in 60 Seconds (1974), Double Nickels (1977) and Deadline Auto Theft (1983). There was indeed an actor named George Cole performing in these films, but he was not the subject of this entry. Cole wrote in his autobiography that "it is easy to spot that it was not" him because the actor playing in them was black.
