= Peter Martyn (actor) =

British actor and TV presenter (1925–1955)

- Born: 19 October 1925; London, England
- Died: 15 February 1955 (aged 29); London, England
- Occupation(s): Actor, TV presenter

Peter Martyn (19 October 1925 – 15 February 1955) was a British actor and TV presenter. He hosted the UK version of the U.S. game show The Name's the Same in 1954, and the game show Find the Link in 1954-55.

He also acted in the original Broadway production of Terence Rattigan's Harlequinade, in 1949.

Films and television series in which he appeared included:

- The Devil's Pass (1957)
- No Smoking (1955)
- Mad About Men (1954)
- Orders Are Orders (1954)
- Child's Play (1954)
- You Know What Sailors Are (1954)
- The Intruder (1953)
- Folly to Be Wise (1953)
- The Happy Family (1952)
- Lady Godiva Rides Again (1951)
- Appointment with Venus (1951)
- Studio One (1950 television series)
