= Richard Wattis =

English actor (1912–1975)

- Wattis circa 1955
- Born: Richard Cameron Wattis; 25 February 1912; Wednesbury, Staffordshire, England
- Died: 1 February 1975 (aged 62); Kensington, London, England
- Occupation: Actor

Richard Cameron Wattis (25 February 1912 – 1 February 1975) was an English actor, co-starring in many popular British comedies of the 1950s and 1960s.

== Early life ==
Richard Cameron Wattis was born on 25 February 1912 in Wednesbury, Staffordshire, the elder of two sons born to Cameron Tom Wattis and Margaret Janet, née Preston. He attended King Edward's School and Bromsgrove School, after which he worked for the electrical engineering firm William Sanders & Co (Wednesbury) Ltd, the managing director being his maternal uncle, William Preston (1874–1941), who was also the Conservative MP for Walsall from 1924 to 1929.

== Career ==
After leaving the family business, Wattis became an actor. His debut was with Croydon Repertory Theatre, and he made many stage appearances in the West End in London. His first appearance in a film was A Yank at Oxford (1938).

War service interrupted his career as an actor. He served as a second lieutenant in the Small Arms Section of Special Operations Executive at Station VI during the Second World War (James Bond author Ian Fleming worked in the same section).

Wattis is best known for his appearances, wearing his thick-rimmed round spectacles, in British comedies of the 1950s and 1960s, often as a "Man from the Ministry" or similar character. Such appearances included the St Trinian's films (The Belles of St. Trinian's, Blue Murder at St Trinian's, and The Great St Trinian's Train Robbery) as Manton Bassett, a civil servant who was the Deputy Director of Schools in the Ministry of Education, where he was often seen frowning and expressing indignation at the outrageous behaviour of other characters. To American audiences, Wattis is probably best known for his performance as the British civil servant Northbrook in The Prince and the Showgirl (1957). He broke from this typecasting in his later films, such as his starring role in Games That Lovers Play.

Wattis's other films included Hobson's Choice, The Inn of the Sixth Happiness, Chitty Chitty Bang Bang, Carry On Spying, The Colditz Story, Dentist on the Job, Very Important Person, The Happiest Days of Your Life, and The Longest Day. He also appeared on television, including a long-running role in Sykes and as a storyteller on the BBC children's programme Jackanory, narrating in 14 episodes between 1971 and 1972. Other television credits include appearances in Danger Man, The Prisoner, The Goodies, Hancock's Half Hour, and Father, Dear Father. From 1957 to 1958, he appeared as Peter Jamison in three episodes of the American sitcom Dick and the Duchess. He was the narrator in Sex and the Other Woman (1972).

== Personal life and death ==
On 1 February 1975, Wattis suffered a heart attack while dining at Berwick's Restaurant in Walton Street, London. He was taken to hospital, but was dead on arrival. He was 62 years old. A memorial service was held for him at St Paul's, Covent Garden, the "Actor's Church", and a plaque near his grave.

In 1999, 24 years after Wattis' death, it emerged that Wattis was gay.

== In fiction ==
Wattis was played by Richard Clifford in the 2011 film My Week with Marilyn, which depicts the making of the 1957 film The Prince and the Showgirl.

== Selected filmography ==
- A Yank at Oxford (1938) as Latin Speaker at Dinner (uncredited)
- Marry Me! (1949) as Minor Role (uncredited)
- Kind Hearts and Coronets (1949) as Defence Counsel (uncredited)
- Helter Skelter (1949) as Compere of Nick Nack show (uncredited)
- The Chiltern Hundreds (1949) as Vicar (uncredited)
- Your Witness (1950) as Minor Role (uncredited)
- The Happiest Days of Your Life (1950) as Arnold Billings
- The Clouded Yellow (1950) as Employment Agent
- The Lavender Hill Mob (1951) as Opposition MP (uncredited)
- Appointment with Venus (1951) as Carruthers – Higher Executive
- Lady Godiva Rides Again (1951) as Otto Mann (casting director)
- The Happy Family (1952) as M.P.
- Song of Paris (1952) as Carter
- Stolen Face (1952) as Mr. Wentworth, Store Manager
- The Importance of Being Earnest (1952) as Seton
- Derby Day (1952) as Editor (uncredited)
- Mother Riley Meets the Vampire (1952) as P.C. Freddie
- Penny Princess (1952) as Hotel Desk Clerk (uncredited)
- Made in Heaven (1952) as The Vicar, Hayworth Honeycroft
- Top Secret (1952) as Barnes
- Top of the Form (1953) as Willoughby-Gore
- Appointment in London (1953) as Pascal
- Innocents in Paris (1953) as Secretary
- Colonel March Investigates (1953) as Cabot
- The Final Test (1953) as Cricket Fan in the Stand. (uncredited)
- Park Plaza 605 (1953) as Theodore Feather
- Blood Orange (1953) as Detective Inspector MacLeod
- The Intruder (1953) as School Master
- Background (1953) as David Wallace
- Small Town Story (1953) as Marsh (uncredited)
- Doctor in the House (1954) as Medical Book Salesman (uncredited)
- Hobson's Choice (1954) as Albert Prosser
- The Belles of St. Trinian's (1954) as Manton Bassett
- The Crowded Day (1954) as Mr. Christopher
- Lease of Life (1954) as The Solicitor
- The Colditz Story (1955) as Richard Gordon
- As Long as They're Happy (1955) as Theatre Stage Manager (uncredited)
- See How They Run (1955) as Rev. Lionel Toop
- I Am a Camera (1955) as Bespectacled Man at Book Launch (uncredited)
- Escapade (1955) as Peace committee member (uncredited)
- Simon and Laura (1955) as Controller of Television Drama ('CT')
- An Alligator Named Daisy (1955) as Hoskins
- The Time of His Life (1955) as John Edgar
- A Yank in Ermine (1955) as Boone
- Jumping for Joy (1956) as Carruthers
- The Man Who Never Was (1956) as Shop Assistant
- The Man Who Knew Too Much (1956) as Assistant Manager
- The Iron Petticoat (1956) as Lingerie Clerk
- Eyewitness (1956) as Anesthetist
- It's a Wonderful World (1956) as Harold
- The Green Man (1956) as Doctor
- A Touch of the Sun (1956) as Purchase
- Death in the Dressing Room (1956 episode of Colonel March of Scotland Yard) as D. W. Cabot
- The Silken Affair (1956 as Worthington
- Around the World in 80 Days (1956) as Inspector Hunter of Scotland Yard (uncredited)
- The Little Hut (1957) as Official
- Second Fiddle (1957) as Bill Turner
- The Prince and the Showgirl (1957) as Northbrook
- The Abominable Snowman (1957) as Peter Fox
- High Flight (1957) as Chauffeur Wilson
- Barnacle Bill (1957) as Registrar of Shipping
- Blue Murder at St Trinian's (1957) as Manton Bassett
- The Inn of the Sixth Happiness (1958) as Mr. Murfin
- The Captain's Table (1959) as Prittlewell
- Ten Seconds to Hell (1959) as Major Haven
- Left Right and Centre (1959) as Harding-Pratt
- The Ugly Duckling (1959) as Barclay
- Libel (1959) as The Judge
- Follow a Star (1959) as Dr. Chatterway
- Your Money or Your Wife (1960) as Hubert Fry
- Follow That Horse! (1960) as Hugh Porlock
- Very Important Person (1961) as Woodcock, Entertainments Officer
- Nearly a Nasty Accident (1961) as Wagstaffe
- Dentist on the Job (1961) as Macreedy
- Play It Cool (1962) as Nervous Man
- Bon Voyage! (1962) as Party guest
- I Thank a Fool (1962) as Ebblington
- The Longest Day (1962) as Maj. Whaley, British Paratrooper
- Venus fra Vestø (1962) as Englænder
- Come Fly with Me (1963) as Oliver Garson
- The V.I.P.s (1963) as Sanders
- Carry On Spying (1964) as Cobley
- The Amorous Adventures of Moll Flanders (1965) as Jeweler
- Operation Crossbow (1965) as Sir Charles Sims
- The Battle of the Villa Fiorita (1965) as Travel Agent
- The Alphabet Murders (1965) as Wolf
- You Must Be Joking! (1965) as Parkins
- Bunny Lake Is Missing (1965) as Clerk in Shipping Office
- The Liquidator (1965) as Flying Instructor
- Up Jumped a Swagman (1965) as Lever, Music Publisher
- The Great St. Trinian's Train Robbery (1966) as Manton Bassett
- Casino Royale (1967) as British Army Officer
- Wonderwall (1968) as Perkins
- Chitty Chitty Bang Bang (1968) as Secretary at Sweet Factory (uncredited)
- Monte Carlo or Bust! (1969) as Golf Club Secretary
- Tam Lin (1970) as Elroy
- Games That Lovers Play (1971) as Mr. Lothran
- Sex and the Other Woman (1972) as Presenter
- That's Your Funeral (1972) as Simmonds
- Diamonds on Wheels (1974) as Sir Hilary Stanton
- Take Me High (1974) as Sir Charles Furness
- Confessions of a Window Cleaner (1974) as Carole's Father
