= Theme to St. Trinian's =

"Theme to St Trinian's"

Promotional single by Girls Aloud

from the album St. Trinian's: The Soundtrack
- Released: 10 December 2007
- Recorded: 2007
- Genre: Electronic rock; glam rock
- Length: 4:31
- Label: Fascination Records
- Songwriters: Charlie Mole; Ali Thomson
- Producers: Brian Higgins; Xenomania

Girls Aloud singles chronology
"Call the Shots" (2007)	"Theme to St Trinian's" (2007)	"Can't Speak French" (2008)

Music video
- "Theme to St. Trinian's" on YouTube

"Theme to St Trinian's" (also known as "St. Trinian's Chant") is a promotional single recorded by British all-female pop group Girls Aloud for the album St. Trinian's: The Soundtrack (2007), released to promote the film of the same name. The song was written by the film's score composer Charlie Mole and Ali Thompson, while Girls Aloud's recurring collaborators Xenomania provided production.

The track was recorded by Girls Aloud to coincide with their cameo appearance in the film as the St Trinian's School Band. A music video of their performance from the film was used to promote the track, which was available for digital download alongside the rest of the soundtrack album on 10 December 2007. "Theme to St Trinian's" charted at number 51 before being removed by Fascination Records to avoid confusion with Girls Aloud's actual single "Call the Shots".

== Background and release ==
The song was written specifically to serve as the theme tune to the 2007 film St Trinian's. It was written especially by the film's composer Charlie Mole, with additional lyrics by Ali Thompson. The song was offered to many artists, but was eventually given to Girls Aloud and produced by their production team Xenomania.

"Theme to St Trinian's" was later re-recorded by the Banned of St Trinian's; this appeared on the soundtrack to St Trinian's 2: The Legend of Fritton's Gold and was also produced by Xenomania. Coincidentally, Girls Aloud member Sarah Harding had a starring role in the film.

A music video for the song was released to music video stations to promote the film and the soundtrack. The video consists of Girls Aloud performing the song at the end of the movie, as well as various clips of other scenes from throughout the film.

== Reception ==
Digital Spy called the song "an electro-glam-sci-fi-rock romp" and gave the song a positive review. InTheNews.co.uk, however, called it a "below-average song".

The song debuted at number ninety-six on the UK Singles Chart on 5 January 2008, due to high download sales. It rose to number fifty-one a week later. The song was then removed from the iTunes Store to avoid confusion with Girls Aloud's actual single "Call the Shots", but re-added in April 2008.

== Charts ==
Chart performance for "Theme to St. Trinian's"
Chart (2008)	Peak position
UK Singles (Official Charts)	51
