= Comrade Dad =

- Written by: Ian Davidson; Peter Vincent
- Directed by: John Kilby
- Starring: George Cole; Barbara Ewing; Doris Hare; Claire Toeman; David Garlick
- Country of origin: United Kingdom
- Original language: English
- No. of series: 1
- No. of episodes: 8

Production
- Producer: John Kilby
- Running time: 30 minutes

Original release
- Network: BBC2
- Release: 17 December 1984 – 24 February 1986

Comrade Dad is a BBC satirical sitcom set in 1999 in Londongrad, the capital of the USSR-GB, after the United Kingdom has been invaded by the Soviet Union and turned into a communist state. The programme focussed on the Dudgeon family (starring George Cole as Reg Dudgeon) and their attempts to adapt to the new order.

== History ==
=== Pilot ===
The pilot episode explains how the Soviets have managed a remarkable bloodless coup – the revolution took place on 27 June 1987, when, upon learning that thousands of Russian missiles were approaching, the government and all the other "important" members of British society took refuge in nuclear fallout shelters. But the "missiles" turned out to be aeroplanes full of paratroopers who parachuted to land and calmly sealed off the entrances to the shelters, so removing all the powerful people from the picture at a single stroke and enabling the Russians to take control. (This explanatory pilot was remade as the opening episode of the series which began just over a year later, with slight changes in the cast and format).

=== Series ===
The series is about Reg Dudgeon, a working-class man who thinks that the Soviet takeover is wonderful and tries to champion the work of his rulers and party line. Unfortunately, his beliefs are tested as the excesses of life under the communists – food shortages, long queues, low wages – begin to take their toll. Undeterred, Reg manages to keep his faith, despite even discovering that there exists another side of the USSR-GB where elaborate garden parties take place, attended by a few privileged party members.

== Cast ==
- George Cole – Reg Dudgeon (Dad)
- Colette O'Neil – Treen Dudgeon (Mum) (pilot only)
- Barbara Ewing – Treen Dudgeon (Mum) (series)
- Anna Wing – Gran (pilot only)
- Doris Hare – Gran (series)
- Claire Toeman – Zo Dudgeon
- David Garlick – Bob Dudgeon
- Danielle Carter – Cosackette

== Transmission details ==
Eight episodes (including the pilot) were broadcast, each thirty minutes in length.

=== Pilot ===
Broadcast on Monday 17 December 1984 BBC2 8pm

=== Series one ===
All episodes were broadcast on BBC2 at 9pm

- Episode 1: "Londongrad 1999" 13 January 1986
- Episode 2: "Don't Feel Bad, Dad" 21 January 1986
- Episode 3: "The Lost Domain" 28 January 1986
- Episode 4: "Of Gods and Heroes" 3 February 1986
- Episode 5: "Dangerous Connections" 10 February 1986
- Episode 6: "My Vegetable Love" 17 February 1986
- Episode 7: "Cars That Pass in the Night" 24 February 1986

== Production ==
The series was created by writers Ian Davidson and Peter Vincent. Although inspired by the-then possible threat of a Soviet takeover of the United Kingdom, the series also reflected the writers' experiences of rationing during World War II. The writers claimed that George Cole did not get on well with the rest of the cast. David Garlick, who played Bob Dudgeon, remembered Cole more favourably, but noted that he appeared to struggle with the process of filming a sitcom for a live audience. Garlick also recalls deliberately fluffing his own lines in order to generate bigger laughs from the studio audience.

The show was not renewed for a second series. Ian Davidson claims that the BBC lost interest in making further series when George Cole declined to appear in a second series, while Peter Vincent says that the rise to power of Mikhail Gorbachev in the Soviet Union rendered the show's subject matter irrelevant.

The rotating red star on top of Nelson's Column in the show's opening titles was a rendered 3D model added onto the filmed footage. The show's theme music is a version of "It's a Long Way to Tipperary" sung in the style of the Red Army Choir.

== Reception ==
The show received a mixed reception from critics, while then-deputy Soviet foreign minister Nikita Ryzhov, visiting Britain at the time of the show's broadcast, criticised the show for being "unfriendly" and "not conducive to an improvement in Anglo-Soviet relations".
