= The Belles of St. Trinian's =

1954 British comedy film by Frank Launder

The Belles of St Trinian's
- DVD cover
- Directed by: Frank Launder
- Written by: Frank Launder; Sidney Gilliat; Val Valentine
- Based on: St Trinian's cartoons by Ronald Searle
- Produced by: Frank Launder; Sidney Gilliat
- Starring: Alastair Sim; Joyce Grenfell; George Cole; Hermione Baddeley
- Cinematography: Stanley Pavey
- Edited by: Thelma Connell
- Music by: Malcolm Arnold
- Production companies: London Films; Individual Pictures
- Distributed by: British Lion Films
- Release date: 28 September 1954
- Running time: 86 minutes
- Country: United Kingdom
- Language: English

The Belles of St Trinian's is a 1954 British comedy film, directed by Frank Launder, co-written by Launder and Sidney Gilliat, and starring Alastair Sim, Joyce Grenfell, George Cole, Hermione Baddeley. It was based on British cartoonist Ronald Searle's St Trinian's School comic strips. The film focuses on students and teachers of the fictional school, dealing with attempts to shut it down while the headmistress faces financial troubles, which culminates in students thwarting a scheme involving a racehorse.

The film was among the most popular British films of 1954, critics praising the comedy and several of the cast, including Sim's dual role as the headmistress, Miss Millicent Fritton, and her twin brother, Clarence Fritton. The film was the first of the St. Trinian's series – three sequels were later produced: Blue Murder at St Trinian's (1957); The Pure Hell of St Trinian's (1960); and The Great St Trinian's Train Robbery (1966).

== Plot ==
The Sultan of Makyad enrols his daughter Fatima at St. Trinian's, a girls' school in England, run by its headmistress Millicent Fritton. She discovers that Millicent prepares her students to succeed in a merciless world by fighting authoritative figures in the police and government. Many of the girls are unruly and have criminal relations; as a result, the curriculum focuses on crime and illicit schemes, all while the students thwart efforts by the local police and the Ministry of Education to shut the school. Millicent, however, faces problems as St. Trinian's is on the verge of bankruptcy, and seeks any means to clear the school's debt.

Millicent's twin, bookmaker Clarence Fritton, visits the school to check in on his sister and learns about Fatima. Knowing that her father owns a horse due to take part in a major race, Clarence enrols his daughter, Arabella, with instructions to befriend Fatima and extract information about the horse. At the same time, local police superintendent Kemp Bird assigns sergeant Ruby Gates, with whom he is in a relationship, to infiltrate the school as a games mistress, while the Ministry assigns Manton Bassett to send in a new inspector to St. Trinian's after two others disappeared – unaware that they now work at the school.

Clarence learns from Arabella that the Sultan's horse is likely to win. Arabella suggests to her father that her gang can incapacitate the stable boy and abduct the horse, hiding it until the race is over. At the same time, several girls report the horse's performance to Millicent, who places a wager via the spiv, 'Flash' Harry. When Fatima discovers Arabella leading sixth-form girls to kidnap the horse, she leads her fourth-form classmates to recover the animal and smuggle it back to the racecourse before the race. As the police and Ministry are embarrassed by failing to prevent trouble, the girls ensure the horse wins. As Millicent is berated by the girl's parents over the way she runs the school, Harry arrives to say the win has netted the school the money it needs to stay open, to her relief.

== Cast ==
- Alastair Sim as headmistress Millicent Fritton / Clarence Fritton
- Joyce Grenfell as Sergeant Ruby Gates
- Lorna Henderson as Princess Fatima
- George Cole as Flash Harry
- Hermione Baddeley as Miss Drownder
- Betty Ann Davies as Miss Waters
- Renée Houston as Miss Brimmer
- Beryl Reid as Miss Wilson
- Irene Handl as Miss Gale
- Mary Merrall as Miss Buckland
- Joan Sims as Miss Dawn
- Balbina as Mlle de St Emilion
- Jane Henderson as Miss Holland
- Diana Day as Jackie
- Jill Braidwood as Florrie
- Annabelle Covey as Maudie
- Pauline Drewett as Celia
- Jean Langston as Rosie
- Lloyd Lamble as Superintendent Kemp Bird, boyfriend of Ruby Gates
- Richard Wattis as Manton Bassett, civil servant in the Ministry of Education
- Guy Middleton as Eric Rowbottom-Smith, a ministry inspector, now a teacher at the school
- Arthur Howard as Wilfred Woodley, another ministry inspector, also now a teacher
- Michael Ripper as Albert Faning
- Eric Pohlmann as The Sultan of Makyad
- Sid James as Benny, one of Clarence Fritton's racing associates
- Martin Walker as Hankinson
- Noel Hood as Bilston School Mistress
- Vivienne Martin as Arabella
- Elizabeth Griffiths as Gladys
- Andrée Melly as Lucretia
- Belinda Lee as Amanda
- Moiya Kelly (uncredited)

Ronald Searle appeared in a cameo role as a visiting parent. Roger Delgado plays the Sultan's aide. It was also the first film appearance of Barbara Windsor, then a teenager.

== Production ==
The film was based on the cartoons of Ronald Searle. He started doing sketches at the beginning of the war and continued to do them as a POW in Singapore. After the war they became very successful. By the time the film was made Searle had become tired of them.

=== Filming ===
Filming took place in April–May 1954. The opening scenes of the girls returning to school were filmed at what is now the All Nations Christian College near Ware, Hertfordshire. This includes the entrance gate of Holycross Road and the outside shots of the school. The bulk of the film was shot at Shepperton Studios near London. The film's sets were designed by the art director Joseph Bato.

=== Music ===
The music for the film was written by the English composer Malcolm Arnold. The music was arranged as a concert suite for orchestra with piano four hands by Christopher Palmer. The suite was performed at the BBC Proms in 2003 and 2021.

== Reception ==
=== Box office ===
The film was the third most popular movie at the British box office in 1954, after Doctor in the House and Trouble in Store.

=== Critical reception ===
Kine Weekly said "Wacky, side-spitiing collegiate extravaganza, based on Ronald Searle’s grotesque, though wildly funny, drawings, illustrating odd, unseemly goings-on at a young ladies’ seminary. Alastair Sim fills the dual role of headmistress and her bookie brother, and his sly sense of humour holds the chapter of lunatic incidents firmly together. A first-rate supporting cast packed with experienced adults and eager youngsters, and liberal staging put the finishing fouches to another sure winner from The Happiest Days of Your Life stable. Get on to it without delay!"

The New York Times wrote, "Credit Alastair Sim with doing excellently by the dual roles he essays ... Joyce Grenfell makes a properly gangling, awkward and gullible lady sleuth; George Cole does a few delightful turns as the conniving Cockney go-between and last, but not least, the Belles of St. Trinian's rate a vote of confidence for the whacky freedom of expression they exhibit. They all help make St. Trinian's a wonderfully improbable and often funny place to visit."

In British Sound Films: The Studio Years 1928–1959 David Quinlan rated the film as "good", writing: "Rollicking comedy, a big commercial hit."

The Radio Times Guide to Films gave the film 3/5 stars, writing: "Most people's memory of the St Trinian's films dates from their own youth, when the wonderful indiscipline of the tearaways and the debauched indifference of the staff had them longing for their own school to be run along similar lines. In 1954 nothing had ever been seen to compare with this anarchic adaptation of Ronald Searle's cartoons, which turned traditional ideas of female gentility on their heads. Alastair Sim's Miss Fritton and George Cole's Flash Harry became icons of British comic lore, but the real star of the film is Joyce Grenfell."

=== Censorship ===
The film was banned for children under 16 in South Africa.

== See also ==
- BFI Top 100 British films
