= Folly to Be Wise =

1952 film by Frank Launder

- Directed by: Frank Launder
- Written by: James Bridie (play); John Dighton; Frank Launder
- Produced by: Sidney Gilliat
- Starring: Alastair Sim; Elizabeth Allan; Roland Culver; Edward Chapman; Martita Hunt
- Cinematography: Jack Hildyard
- Edited by: Thelma Connell
- Music by: Temple Abady
- Production company: British Lion Film Corporation
- Distributed by: British Lion Film Corporation
- Release date: 4 December 1952 (London)
- Running time: 91 minutes
- Country: United Kingdom
- Language: English

Folly to Be Wise is a 1952 British comedy film directed by Frank Launder and starring Alastair Sim, Elizabeth Allan, Roland Culver, Colin Gordon, Martita Hunt and Edward Chapman. It was written by James Bridie, John Dighton and Launder based on Bridie's play It Depends What You Mean. The film follows the efforts of a British Army chaplain attempting to recruit entertainment acts to perform for the troops and the complications that ensue when he does. The title is taken from the line by Thomas Gray "where ignorance is bliss, 'tis folly to be wise".

== Plot ==
Having recently taken over the role of Entertainments Officer at an army camp, the army chaplain Captain William Paris is disheartened that so few of the troops turn out for an evening of classical music. He visits a local pub, "The Rose and Crown", and finds the place packed with soldiers, including his own driver. He resolves to try and secure something more entertaining for the troops and decides to copy the idea of a brains trust, as in a popular BBC radio programme, where panellists answer questions from the audience.

With the help of Lady Dodds, Paris manages to gather together a group of local notables. These individuals each prove to be mildly eccentric. The group includes the opinionated Professor Mutch, who is a popular radio personality on BBC radio, and his friend the oil painter George Prout and his wife Angela. Arriving at the Prout's house, Paris interrupts Mutch and Mrs Prout who are about to embrace. Then meeting Mr Prout, he soon finds him a cold man who verbally abuses his wife. The 'brains trust' panel is rounded out by the hard-of-hearing Doctor McAdam and the chippy local Labour MP Joseph Byres.

With the help of his secretary, Private Jessie Killigrew, the chaplain manages to organise the event. The hall is relatively well filled. Trying to avoid anything controversial, Paris forbids any discussion of politics or religion and begins with some innocuous questions about cows chasing after trains and if the Moon is inhabited. Things soon become heated when Mr Byres, the local MP, takes offence at comments directed at him and threatens to start a fight. Having only just averted this, a question about marriage from Killigrew reveals the fragility of the Prouts' marriage. Fearing any controversy, Paris quickly announces that it is time for the interval.

As word spreads around the camp of the goings-on, the second half begins with the room completely packed. Paris tries to steer the debate back to harmless questions about bluebottles, but Killigrew interrupts and demands an answer to her earlier question about marriage. As the Prouts begin arguing once again, Mrs Prout admits that the Professor is her "lover". At this, the whole event threatens to descend into anarchy despite Paris' attempts to maintain order. Desperate to restore a sense of propriety, he draws the proceedings to a close, and announces that next week they will return to classical music with a string quartet. A soldier stands up and thanks the chaplain for providing such entertainment and asking if the 'brains trust' can be made a regular feature, to rapturous applause.

Worried about Mr Prout, who has disappeared and has been drinking heavily, the others follow him back to his house, where they mistakenly come to believe that he is going to throw himself over the cliffs, whereas he is merely planning a bit of quiet painting. Meanwhile, the Professor has revealed himself to be an inherently selfish man, while Mr Prout is suddenly far more reasonable. He and Mrs Prout soon resolve their differences, and he tries to be a little more considerate to her.

The film ends with the string quartet playing once more and Paris sitting in an almost empty theatre.

== Cast ==
- Alastair Sim as Captain William Paris
- Elizabeth Allan as Angela Prout
- Roland Culver as George Prout
- Colin Gordon as Professor James Mutch
- Martita Hunt as Lady Dodds
- Janet Brown as Private Jessie Killegrew
- Peter Martyn as Private Walter Glekie
- Miles Malleson as Doctor Hector McAdam
- Edward Chapman as Joseph Byres MP
- Cyril Chamberlain as Drill Sergeant
- Michael Ripper as Drill Corporal
- Robin Bailey as Intellectual Corporal
- Michael Kelly as Staff Sergeant
- George Cole as Audience spokesman (uncredited)
- Maria Charles as WRAC Corp soldier (uncredited)
- Martin Boddey as Brigadier (uncredited)

== Production ==
The film was shot at Shepperton Studios and made by the British Lion Film Corporation. Alastair Sim had previously produced Bridie's play in a 1944 run at the Westminster Theatre and was a driving force behind bringing it to the screen. Launder was encouraged to make the film by Alexander Korda.

The play was broadcast live by BBC Television on 25 June 1946.

== Reception ==
A contemporary New York Times review described the film as a "cheerful British import". While noting that the film did not "succeed in building into towering proportions the fragile theme of what makes a marriage tick" the cast had made it "all worth while". The review praised the performance by Alastair Sim in particular.

The Monthly Film Bulletin wrote: "Bridie's observations on marriage, his digs at the brains trusters, are not amusing enough to sustain the fim, which has been put together with disappointing slacknes. Intermittently lively, the picture as a whole has something of the air of a good-natured charade."

The Radio Times Guide to Films gave the film 3/5 stars, writing: "This Frank Launder and Sidney Gilliat comedy seems so satisfied with its central idea that it neglects to flesh it out with wit. The various members of the splendid cast seem all too aware that they are marking time between those marvellous moments when army chaplain Alastair Sim loses control of his squabbling panellists, but they are powerless to raise the tempo."

In British Sound Films: The Studio Years 1928–1959 David Quinlan rated the film as "good", writing: "Funny-in-parts version of stage hit. Performances are amusing."

Leslie Halliwell said: "Typical James Bridie comedy which starts brightly and whimsically, then peters out and is saved by the acting."

== Accolades ==
Sim was nominated for a Best Actor BAFTA for his role as Captain Paris, but lost to Ralph Richardson for his performance in The Sound Barrier (1953).
