= St Trinian's School =

British gag cartoon comic strip series

Cover of a modern re-issue of St Trinian's drawings

St Trinian's is a British gag cartoon comic strip series, created and drawn by Ronald Searle from 1946 until 1952. The cartoons all centre on a boarding school for girls, where the teachers are sadists and the girls are juvenile delinquents. This black comedy series was Searle's most famous work and inspired a popular series of comedy films.

== Concept ==
Searle published his first St Trinian's School cartoon in 1941 in the magazine Lilliput. He was captured at Singapore in 1942 and spent the rest of the Second World War as a prisoner of the Japanese. After the war, in 1946 Searle started making new cartoons about the girls, but the content was much darker compared to the earlier years.

The school is the antithesis of the type of posh girls' boarding school depicted by Enid Blyton or Angela Brazil; its female pupils are bad and often well armed, and mayhem is rife. The schoolmistresses are also disreputable. Cartoons often showed dead bodies of girls who had been murdered with pitchforks or succumbed to violent team sports, sometimes with vultures circling; girls drank, gambled and smoked. It is reputed that the gymslip style of dress worn by the girls was closely modelled on the school uniform of James Allen's Girls' School (JAGS) in Dulwich, which Searle's daughter Kate attended.

In the 1950s, films were developed that were based on the cartoon series. These comedies implied that the girls at the school were the daughters of dubious characters, such as gangsters, crooks, and shady bookmakers. The institution is often referred to as a "female borstal", as if it were a reform school.

== The inspiration ==
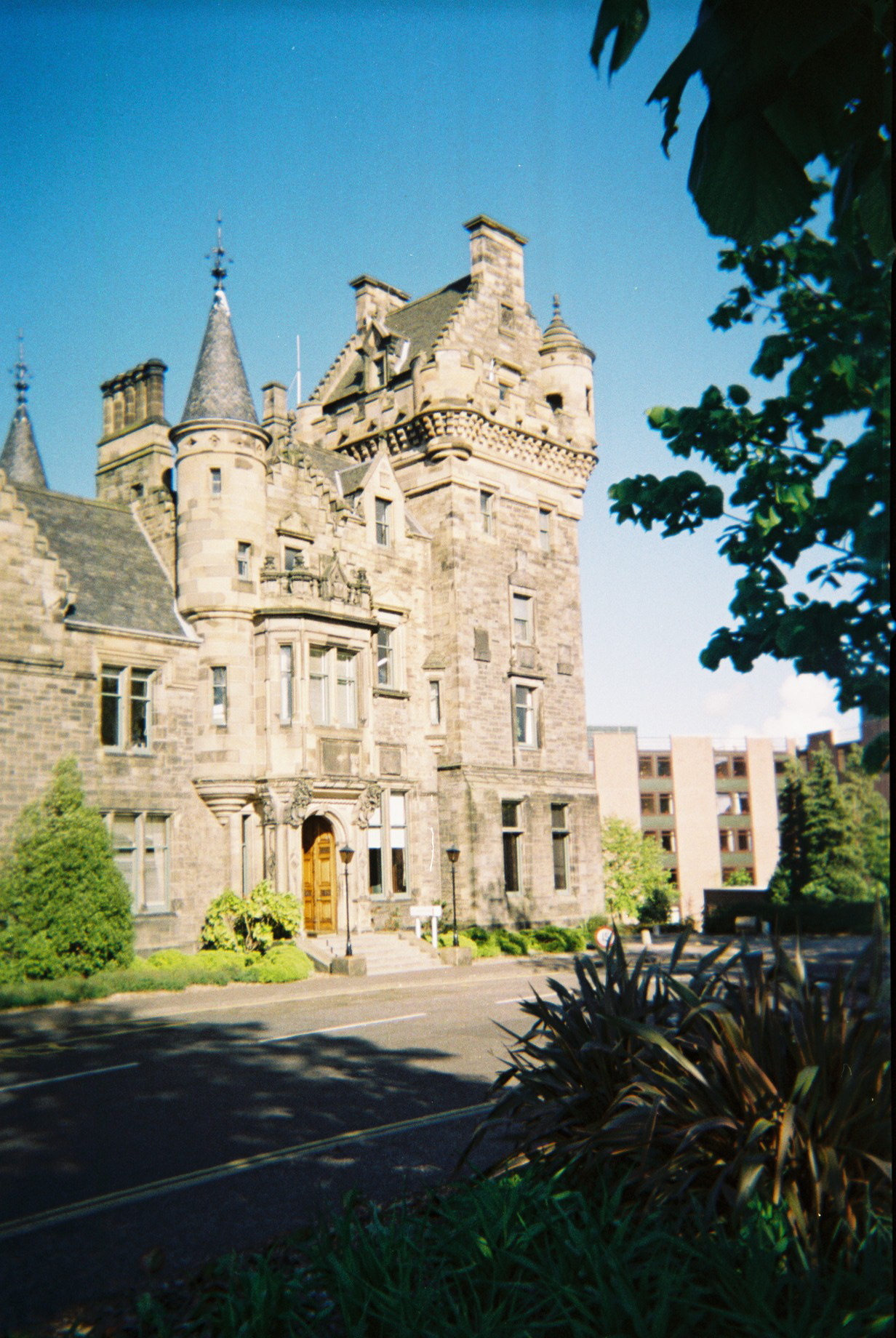
St Leonard's Hall, Pollock Halls of Residence, University of Edinburgh. Home of St Trinnean's School for Girls until World War II, when the school was moved to the countryside

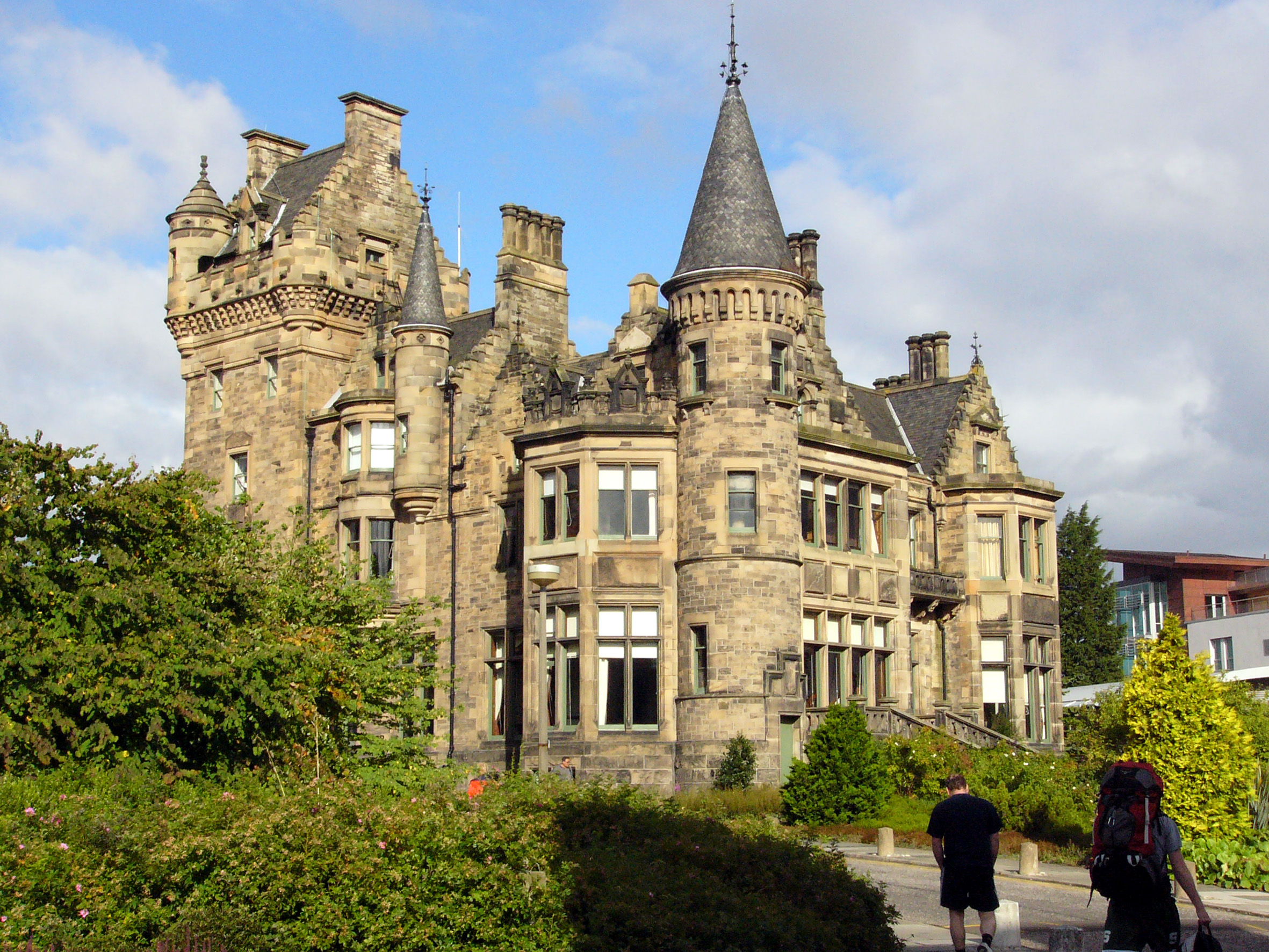
Rear of St Leonard's Hall, Pollock Halls of Residence, University of Edinburgh

During 1941 Searle had gone to the artists' community in the village of Kirkcudbright. Whilst visiting the family Johnston, he made a drawing to please their two schoolgirl daughters, Cécilé and Pat. (Their school had been evacuated to New Gala House in Galashiels in the Scottish Borders owing to the war.) Searle was puzzled as to why two schoolgirls should seem so keen to return to their school, an Academy for Young Ladies in Dalkeith Road known as St Trinnean's. The school was of the experimental sort, and allowed its pupils a certain degree of freedom and autonomy in their own educational choices. The school's original building is now part of the University of Edinburgh.

Searle's St Trinian's was based on two private girls' schools in Cambridge – Perse School for Girls, now known as the co-educational Stephen Perse Foundation, and St Mary's School for girls, a Catholic school established by the Sisters of Mary Ward. Growing up in Cambridge, Searle regularly saw the girls on their way to and from school; they originally inspired his cartoons and characters. The Perse School for Girls' Archive area holds several original St Trinian's books, given to the school by Ronald Searle. He also based the school partly on the former Cambridgeshire High School for Girls (now Long Road Sixth Form College).

During his BBC interview Searle agreed that the cruelty depicted at St Trinian's derived partly from his captivity during World War II but stressed that he included it only because the ignoble aspect to warfare in general had become more widely known.

== Books ==
- Hurrah for St Trinian's (1948)
- The Female Approach (1950)
- Back to the Slaughterhouse (1952)
- The Terror of St Trinians or Angela's Prince Charming (1952; text by Timothy Shy, pen-name for D. B. Wyndham Lewis)
- Souls in Torment (1953)

== Film adaptations ==
In the 1950s, a series of St Trinian's comedy films were made, featuring well-known British actors, including Alastair Sim (in drag as the headmistress, and also playing her brother); George Cole as spiv "Flash Harry", Joyce Grenfell as Sgt Ruby Gates, a beleaguered policewoman; and Richard Wattis and Eric Barker as the civil servants at the Ministry of Education for whom the school is a source of constant frustration and nervous breakdowns. Searle's cartoons appeared in the films' main title design.

In the films the school became embroiled in various shady enterprises, thanks mainly to Flash, and, as a result, was always threatened with closure by the Ministry. (In the last of the original four, this became the "Ministry of Schools", possibly because of fears of a libel action from a real Minister of Education.) The first four films form a chronological quartet, and were produced by Frank Launder and Sidney Gilliat. They had earlier produced The Happiest Days of Your Life (1950), a stylistically similar school comedy, starring Alastair Sim, Joyce Grenfell, George Cole, Richard Wattis, Guy Middleton, and Bernadette O'Farrell, all of whom later appeared in the St Trinian's series, often playing similar characters.

Barchester and Barset were used as names for the fictional towns near which St Trinian's School was supposedly located in the original films. In Blue Murder at St Trinian's, a signpost was marked as 2 miles to Barset, 8 miles to Wantage, indicating a location in what was Berkshire at the time of filming (transferred to Oxfordshire in 1974).

St Trinian's is depicted as an unorthodox girls' school where the younger girls wreak havoc and the older girls express their femininity overtly, turning their shapeless schoolgirl dress into something sexy and risqué by the standards of the times. St Trinian's is often invoked in discussions about groups of schoolgirls running amok.

The St Trinian's girls themselves come in two categories: the Fourth Form, most closely resembling Searle's original drawings of ink-stained, ungovernable pranksters, and the much older Sixth Form, sexually precocious to a degree that may have seemed alarming to some in 1954.

In the films, the Fourth Form includes a number of much younger girls who are the most ferocious of them all. It is something of a rule of thumb that the smaller a St Trinian's is, the more dangerous she is—especially when armed, most commonly with a lacrosse or hockey stick—though none of them can ever be considered harmless.

In the first two films, St Trinian's is presided over by the genial Miss Millicent Fritton (Sim in drag), whose philosophy is summed up as: "In other schools girls are sent out quite unprepared into a merciless world, but when our girls leave here, it is the merciless world which has to be prepared." Later other headmistresses included Dora Bryan in The Great St Trinian's Train Robbery.

In December 2007, a new film, St Trinian's, was released. The cast included Rupert Everett, Colin Firth, Russell Brand, Lily Cole, Talulah Riley, Stephen Fry, and Gemma Arterton. Reviews were mixed. A second new St Trinian's film, St Trinian's 2: The Legend of Fritton's Gold, was released in 2009.

The first series

1. The Belles of St Trinian's (1954)
2. Blue Murder at St Trinian's (1957)
3. The Pure Hell of St Trinian's (1960)
4. The Great St Trinian's Train Robbery (1966)

The first reboot

- The Wildcats of St Trinian's (1980, with Maureen Lipman taking on the Joyce Grenfell role)

The second reboot

1. St Trinian's (2007)
2. St Trinian's 2: The Legend of Fritton's Gold (2009)

=== Coat of arms ===
The school's coat of arms was originally shown as a black skull-and-crossbones on a field of white. This was later changed to a white tau cross (symbolising the "T" in Trinian's) on a black field bordered white.

=== School motto ===
The school has no fixed motto but has had several suggested ones. The school's motto is depicted in the original movies from the 1950s and 1960s as In flagrante delicto ("Caught in the Act"). This can be seen on the trophy shelf, above the stairs in The Belles of St Trinian's (1954). The lyrics of the original theme song by Sidney Gilliat (c. 1954) imply that the school's motto is "Get your blow in first" (Semper debeatis percutis ictu primo).

A poem in one of Searle's books called "St Trinian's Soccer Song", by D. B. Wyndham Lewis and Johnny Dankworth, states that the motto is Floreat St Trinian's ("May St Trinian's Bloom/Flourish"), a reference to the motto of Eton (Floreat Etona—"May Eton Flourish").

=== School songs ===
The musical score for the St Trinian films was written by Malcolm Arnold and included the school song, with words accredited to Sidney Gilliat (1954). In the 2007 film, a new school song, written by Girls Aloud, was called "Defenders of Anarchy". The school also has a fight song.

== In popular culture ==
- Between 1968 and 1972, the British comic-book The Beano ran a series entitled The Belles of St. Lemons, which was inspired by the original St Trinian's cartoons by Ronald Searle.
- The gauge 0 model train manufacturer ACE Trains produce an "unorthodox" model of a British Schools Class steam locomotive (which were named after British schools), numbered 1922 and named "St Trinneans" (sic). This model is bright pink and has a pair of uniformed schoolgirls as driver and fireman.
- In 1990, Chris Claremont and Ron Wagner paid tribute to both Searle and St Trinian's in a story arc in the Marvel comic book Excalibur, in which Kitty Pryde became a student at "St Searle's School for Young Ladies". Towards the end of the arc, Commander Dai Thomas exclaims, "I took a look at the Special Branch records. Have you any notion what this school's done in the past? With them about, who needs the perishing SAS?"

== See also ==
- Category:St Trinian's films
