= Frank Launder =

British film creator (1906–1997)

- Born: 28 January 1906; Hitchin, Hertfordshire, England
- Died: 23 February 1997 (aged 91); Monte Carlo, Monaco
- Occupations: Film director, producer, writer
- Spouse: Bernadette O'Farrell (1950–1997; his death)
- Children: 2

Frank Launder (28 January 1906 – 23 February 1997) was a British writer, film director and producer, who made more than 40 films, many of them in collaboration with Sidney Gilliat.

== Early life and career ==
He was born in Hitchin, Hertfordshire, England and worked briefly as a clerk before becoming an actor and then a playwright.

He began working as a screenwriter on British films in the 1930s, contributing the original story for the classic Will Hay comedy Oh, Mr Porter! (1937).

== Sidney Gilliat ==
Launder first collaborated with Gilliat in 1936 on the film Seven Sinners. After writing a number of screenplays with Gilliat, including The Lady Vanishes (1938) for Alfred Hitchcock, and Night Train to Munich for Carol Reed; the two men wrote and directed the wartime drama Millions Like Us (1943). He and Gilliat were championed by studio head Ted Black who influenced the team's later career.

After founding their own production company Individual Pictures, they produced a number of memorable dramas and thrillers including I See a Dark Stranger (1945) and Green for Danger (1946), but were best known for their comedies including The Happiest Days of Your Life (1950) and most famously, the St Trinian's series, based on Ronald Searle's cartoons set in an anarchic girls school.

After The Happiest Days of Your Life Launder focused entirely on comedy.

According to the British Film Institute 'over a hundred films feature either Launder or Gilliat in the credits, nearly forty feature both' but this large number was not 'at the expense of quality'.

== Personal life ==
He was married secondly to actress Bernadette O'Farrell from 1950 until his death in Monaco. The couple had two children. Launder also had two children from his first marriage.

== Selected films ==
Year	Title	Director	Writer	Producer
1929	Under the Greenwood Tree	No	Yes	No
1930	Children of Chance	No	Yes	No
1930	The W Plan	No	Yes	No
1931	Hobson's Choice	No	Yes	No
1931	Keepers of Youth	No	Yes	No
1931	The Woman Between	No	Yes	No
1931	Children of Fortune	No	Yes	No
1932	After Office Hours	No	Yes	No
1932	Josser in the Army	No	Yes	No
1932	For the Love of Mike	No	Yes	No
1933	Hawley's of High Street	No	Yes	No
1933	Facing the Music	No	Yes	No
1933	A Southern Maid	No	Yes	No
1934	Those Were the Days	No	Yes	No
1935	Get Off My Foot	No	Yes	No
1935	Rolling Home	No	Yes	No
1935	The Black Mask	No	Yes	No
1935	Emil and the Detectives	No	Yes	No
1936	Educated Evans	No	Yes	No
1936	Twelve Good Men	No	Yes	No
1936	Where's Sally?	No	Yes	No
1937	Don't Get Me Wrong	No	Yes	No
1937	Oh, Mr Porter!	No	Story	No
1938	The Lady Vanishes	No	Yes	No
1940	Night Train to Munich	No	Yes	No
1940	They Came by Night	No	Yes	No
1942	The Young Mr. Pitt	No	Yes	No
1942	Partners in Crime	Yes	Yes	No
1943	Millions Like Us	Yes	Yes	Yes
1944	Two Thousand Women	Yes	Yes	No
1945	I See a Dark Stranger	Yes	Yes	No
1946	Green for Danger	No	No	Yes
1947	Captain Boycott	Yes	Yes	No
1949	The Blue Lagoon	Yes	Yes	Yes
1950	The Happiest Days of Your Life	Yes	Yes	Yes
1952	Folly to Be Wise	Yes	Yes	Yes
1953	The Story of Gilbert and Sullivan	No	No	Yes
1954	The Belles of St. Trinian's	Yes	Yes	Yes
1955	The Constant Husband	No	No	Yes
1955	Geordie	No	Yes	Yes
1956	The Green Man	No	Yes	Yes
1957	Blue Murder at St Trinian's	Yes	Yes	Yes
1959	Left Right and Centre	No	Yes	Yes
1959	The Bridal Path	Yes	Yes	Yes
1960	The Pure Hell of St Trinian's	Yes	Yes	Yes
1965	Joey Boy	Yes	Yes	No
1966	The Great St Trinian's Train Robbery	Yes	Yes	No
1980	The Wildcats of St Trinian's	Yes	Yes	No
