= Double Nickels =

- Theatrical release poster
- Directed by: Jack Vacek
- Written by: Patrice Schubert; Jack Vacek
- Produced by: Jack Vacek
- Starring: Ed Abrams
- Cinematography: Ron Sawade; Tony Syslo
- Edited by: Mick Brennan; Ron Sawade; Tony Syslo; Jack Vacek
- Music by: Mick Brennan; J.B. Crabtree; Mark Hanes; Tim Henderson
- Production company: Smokey Productions
- Distributed by: Smokey Productions
- Release date: July 1977 (United States)
- Running time: 89 minutes
- Country: United States
- Language: English

Double Nickels is a 1977 car chase action-comedy starring Jack Vacek, Patrice Schubert, Ed Abrams, George Cole, Michael "Mick" Brennan, and Tim "Tex" Taylor. Vacek also wrote, produced, and directed the film.

The film deals with two men working in the repossession industry, by confiscating cars. They eventually realize that they are unwittingly working for a car theft ring, and that they have been tasked with stealing the vehicles.

== Plot ==
Two highway patrolmen believe that they are making extra money on the side by repossessing cars. They come to realize that they are actually involved in a car theft ring.

== Cast ==
- Jack Vacek as Smokey
- Ed Abrams as Ed
- Mick Brennan as Mick
- George Cole as George
- Michael Cole as Mike
- Larry Dunn as Mechanic
- Patrice Schubert as Jordan

== Production ==
The film was shot in Los Angeles and contains a chase through the Los Angeles River Basin.

== Reception ==
Variety described the film as "more empty calories for junk-film fans; cheap but tasty".

== Re-release ==
The film was re-released theatrically in 1978 under the title Split-Second Smokey.
