= The Wildcats of St Trinian's =

1980 British film by Frank Launder

The Wildcats of St. Trinian's
- DVD cover
- Directed by: Frank Launder
- Written by: Frank Launder; Ronald Searle
- Produced by: E.M. Smedley-Aston
- Starring: Sheila Hancock; Michael Hordern; Joe Melia; Thorley Walters; Rodney Bewes; Maureen Lipman; Julia McKenzie; Rosalind Knight; Ambrosine Phillpotts; Rose Hill; Deborah Norton
- Cinematography: Ernest Steward
- Edited by: Antony Gibbs
- Music by: James Kenelm Clarke
- Production company: Wildcat Film Productions
- Distributed by: Enterprise
- Release date: 1980
- Running time: 91 min.
- Country: United Kingdom
- Language: English

The Wildcats of St Trinian's is the fifth British comedy film set in the fictional St Trinian's School. Directed by Frank Launder, it was released in 1980.

The film pokes fun at the British trade union movement which had been responsible for the recent wave of strikes that culminated in the Winter of Discontent.

The film was not a critical or commercial success. It has yet to be released on DVD except in the US.

== Plot ==
The girls of St. Trinian's hatch yet another fiendish plot—a trade union for British schoolgirls. Their friend and mentor, Flash Harry, suggests a plan which involves kidnapping girls from other rather more respectable colleges and substituting their own "agents". Thus begins a hilarious, often bloody, battle of wits as the girls meet resistance not only from Olga Vandermeer, their Headmistress, but from the Minister of Education, a private detective, and an oil sheikh. Despite all his desperate efforts to foil the conspiracy, the Minister has to face a growing realisation that the girls' demands will have to be met—for him this will mean a very great and very personal sacrifice.

== Cast ==
- Sheila Hancock as Olga Vandemeer
- Michael Hordern as Sir Charles Hackforth
- Joe Melia as Flash Harry
- Thorley Walters as Hugo Culpepper Brown
- Rodney Bewes as Peregrine Butters
- Deborah Norton as Miss Brenner
- Maureen Lipman as Miss Katy Higgs
- Julia McKenzie as Miss Dolly Dormancott
- Ambrosine Phillpotts as Mrs Mowbray
- Rose Hill as Miss Martingale
- Diana King as Miss Mactavish
- Luan Peters as Miss Poppy Adams
- Barbara Hicks as Miss Coke
- Rosalind Knight as Miss Walsh
- Patsy Smart as Miss Warmold
- Bernadette O'Farrell as Miss Carfax
- Sandra Payne as Miss Taylor
- Frances Ruffelle as Angela Hall / Princess Roxanne
- Hilda Braid as Miss Summers
- Mary Manson as Mayfield Headmistress
- Judy Gridley as Mayfield Mistress
- Veronica Quilligan as Lizzie
- Miranda Honnisett as Jennie
- Eileen Fletcher as Agatha
- Anna Mackeown as Harriet
- Sarah Jane Varley as Janet
- Theresa Ratcliff as Maggie
- Lisa Vanderpump as Ursula
- Debbie Linden as Mavis
- Sandra Hall as Big Freda
- Eliza Emery as Butch
- Suzanna Hamilton as Matilda
- Danielle Corgan as Eva Potts
- Nicholas McArdle as Police Sergeant
- Eric Kent as Man in Phone Booth
- Ballard Berkeley as Humphrey Wills
- Melita Clarke as Air Hostess
- Sarah Lam as Chinese Girl
- Tony Wredden as Prince Narouz
- Jeremy Pearce as Evan Williams
- Matthew Smith as Eddie
- Jason Anthony as Sam
- Alfie Curtis as Taxi Driver

== Production ==
It had been fourteen years since the previous St Trinians film. "I didn't want to do another St Trinians unless it could top the previous one," said Launder during filming. "I think this one does." Sidney Gilliat was a production consultant.

"The story is about a school trades union," said Gilliat. "It involves a trade union and an anti trade union. The series has definitely moved with the times."

Finance was meant to come from a major British company but that fell through. Finance came from Hong Kong. E.M. Smedley-Aston came out of retirement to produce.

Filming took place from August to October 1979.

== Reception ==
Derek Malcolm of The Guardian called it "one of the worst films I've ever seen... Please don't do anything like it again. Ever."

Launder wanted to follow the film with an adaptation of the books by Norman Thelwell about a pony school. He almost made it in Norway in the late 1970s and in 1979 planned on making it in Britain the following year. However no movie resulted.
