= The Great St. Trinian's Train Robbery =

1966 British film by Frank Launder and Sidney Gilliat

- Directed by: Sidney Gilliat; Frank Launder
- Written by: Frank Launder; Ivor Herbert
- Produced by: Sidney Gilliat; Frank Launder
- Starring: Frankie Howerd; Dora Bryan; George Cole; Reg Varney; Raymond Huntley; Richard Wattis
- Cinematography: Ken Hodges
- Edited by: Geoffrey Foot
- Music by: Malcolm Arnold
- Distributed by: British Lion Films
- Release date: 4 April 1966
- Running time: 90 minutes
- Country: United Kingdom
- Language: English

The Great St. Trinian's Train Robbery is a 1966 British comedy film, directed by Frank Launder and Sidney Gilliat and starring a selection of actors from previous films in the series, including George Cole, Richard Wattis, Eric Barker, Michael Ripper, and Raymond Huntley, alongside Frankie Howerd, Reg Varney, Dora Bryan, and the voice of Stratford Johns. It was written by Launder and Ivor Herbert from an original story by Launder, Gilliat and Leslie Gilliat. It is the last of the original series of films based on the St Trinian's School set of images and comics, and the only one to be produced in colour.

The film's story focuses on St Trinian's becoming caught up in a train robbery, after the gang who conducted it attempts to reclaim their loot from the building that the pupils and teachers now inhabit. The story is inspired by the actual Great Train Robbery that took place in 1963, and includes numerous parodies of the technocratic ideas of the Harold Wilson government and its support of the comprehensive school system, and spoof elements based upon those from the James Bond spy films of the 1960s.

== Plot ==
Gang leader "Alphonse" Askett, who operates under the guise of a hairdresser, is contacted by his anonymous employer, a secret mastermind, on a plan for a major train robbery. The gang are instructed to rob a mail van of £2.5 million, and hide the loot at Hamingwell Grange, a deserted country mansion, until it is safe to reclaim it. Meanwhile, Amber Spottiswood, the headmistress of St Trinian's, has an affair with Sir Horace, the new head of the Ministry of Schools (a fictional government department) who recently took over following a Labour Party election triumph. Much to his department staff's shock, he willingly provides the school a grant in order to relocate following a fire at their previous building. St Trinian's moves into Hamingwell as a result, which subsequently spook Askett's gang when they attempt to return to recover their loot.

Learning of what happened, the gang's mastermind instructs Askett to find a means to retrieve the stolen money without raising suspicions from the school. Askett decides on sending his delinquent daughters into St Trinian's as new pupils, instructing the pair to gather any useful information that the gang can make use of. Unknown to Askett, one of the pupils at St Trinian's comes across some of the stolen money and brings it to Flash Harry, the school's turf accountant. Discovering it is part of the proceeds from the train robbery reported in the papers, he decides to claim the reward money from Edward Noakes, an insurance assessor. However, Noakes is put off by the secretive manner Harry conducts the meeting under, and decides to keep St Trinian's under observation instead.

The gang soon receive instructions to take advantage of an upcoming Parents' Day at the school, and pose as caterers in order to recover the money. Whilst waiting for the school to be preoccupied with a dance routine in the main hall, the gang lose a camera to one of the pupils, housing a hidden two-way radio. When the camera is brought to Harry in order to be fenced, he and some of the pupils intercept a message for Askett from the mastermind and realise the train robbers are in the school. The gang manage to recover the stolen money and escape, just as the school is alerted to what is happening; while Harry and the pupils chase after the gang, Spottiswood leads the teachers in hopes of claiming the reward money.

A chaotic chase with trains soon ensues. While the gang use a stolen train to make their escape, the pupils commandeer a passenger train to pursue them, and subsequently seize a van car from them carrying the stolen money. At the same time, police are alerted by Noakes, and commandeer another passenger train to pursue both. The pupils swiftly manage to evade the robbers and leave them being chased by the police, with the gang cornered at a station. While officers arrest most of the gang, Askett manages to escape in the chaos. Meanwhile, the pupils bring the stolen money to a station further up the railway line, planning to claim it for themselves, but are prevented from doing so by the arrival of more police. However, the officers applaud the girls for recovering it, causing the pupils to be awarded with medals, much to the shock of others that know them too well.

== Cast ==
- Frankie Howerd as "Alphonse of Monte Carlo" / Alfred Askett
- Dora Bryan as headmistress Amber Spottiswood
- George Cole as Flash Harry
- Reg Varney as Gilbert
- Raymond Huntley as Sir Horace, the Minister
- Richard Wattis as Mr Manton Bassett
- Portland Mason as Georgina
- Terry Scott as policeman
- Eric Barker as Mr Culpepper Brown
- Godfrey Winn as Truelove
- Colin Gordon as Edward Noakes, the Insurance Assessor
- Desmond Walter-Ellis as Leonard Edwards
- Arthur Mullard as Big Jim
- Norman Mitchell as William
- Cyril Chamberlain as Maxie
- Larry Martyn as Chips
- Peter Gilmore as Butters
- Leon Thau as Fordbridge porter
- Michael Ripper as The Liftman at the Ministry
- Stratford Johns as The Voice
- Jeremy Clyde as Monty
- George Benson as Gore-Blackwood
- William Kendall as Mr Parker
- Maureen Crombie as Marcia Askett
- Susan Jones as Lavinia Askett
- Barbara Couper as Mabel Radnage, the deputy headmistress
- Elspeth Duxbury as Veronica Bledlow, the Maths mistress
- Carole Ann Ford as Albertine, the French mistress
- Margaret Nolan as Susie Naphill, the Arts mistress
- Maggie Rennie as Magda O'Riley, the Games mistress
- Jean St Clair as Drunken Dolly, the Music mistress
- Jonathan Cecil as The Guardsman/Alfred Askett's last customer before closing (uncredited)
- Guy Standeven as Sir Horace's chauffeur (uncredited)
- Schoolgirls (uncredited):
  - Ingrid Boulting
  - Sally Geeson
  - Sally-Jane Spencer
  - Michelle Scott

== Production ==
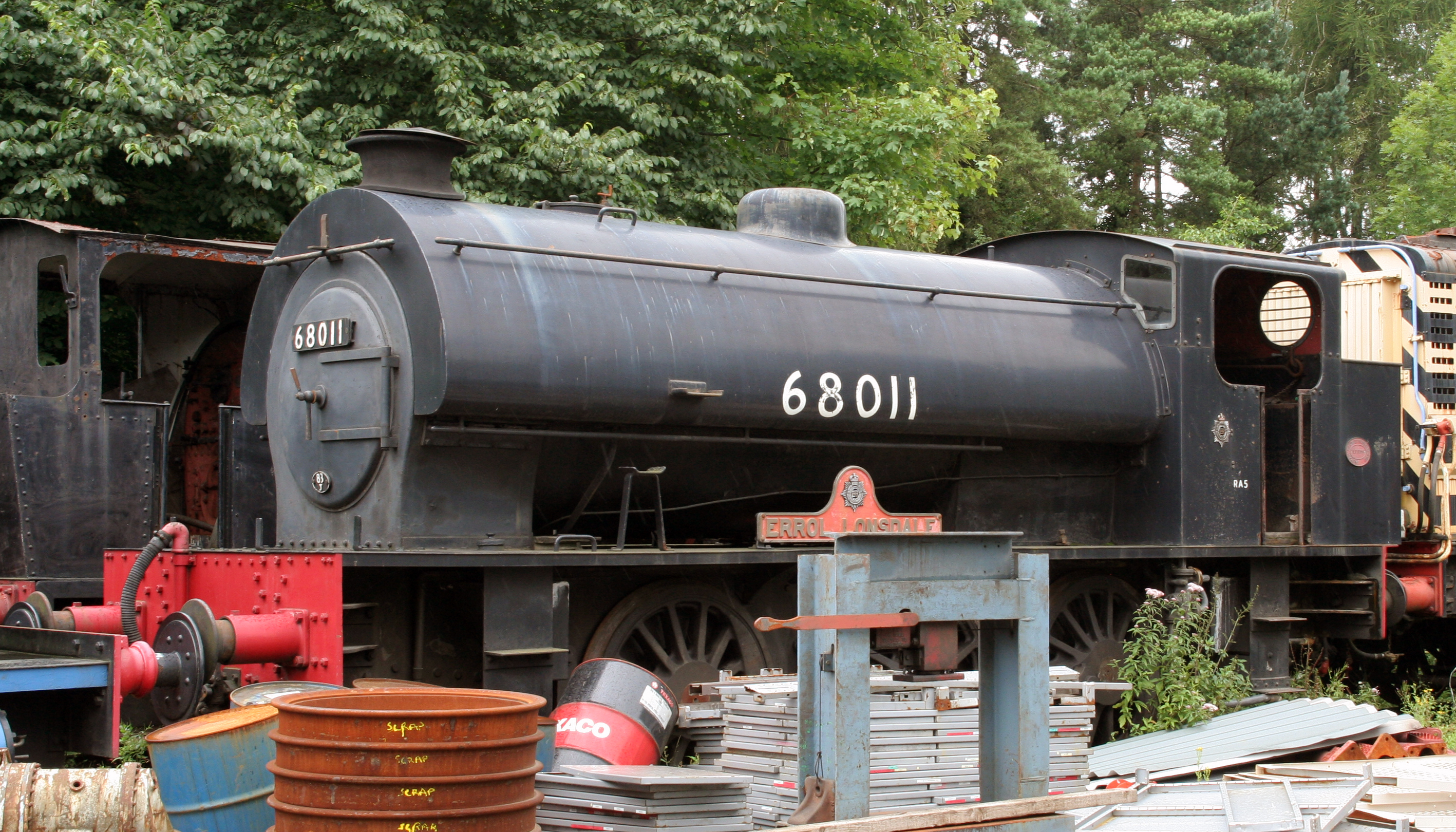
WD196 Errol Lonsdale 68011, used in the film.

The railway scenes were filmed on the former Longmoor Military Railway (closed in 1969). In the final railway scene where the girls 'return' the money the British Railways station at Liss can be seen in the background.

The locomotives used were:

- Longmoor Military Railway WD Austerity 2-10-0 AD601 'Kitchener' as the express locomotive in mock-up green livery and carrying a fake BR-pattern numberplate on the smokebox door until its scrapping in 1967.
- Two Ministry of Supply "Austerity" 0-6-0ST Tank Engines, one of which was mocked up to resemble a J50 and temporarily renumbered 68961, but in reality was WD157 Constantine (this locomotive was scrapped in 1968 by Pollock Brown at Southampton), the other one, WD196 Errol Lonsdale, painted black and given the number 68011. Errol Lonsdale was later saved for preservation, spending time at the Kent & East Sussex Railway, the Mid Hants Railway, and the South Devon Railway, but is now at Stoomcentrum Maldegem.
- One LMS diesel shunter {BR Class 11} in Longmoor colours.
- A DEMU in BR livery as the commuter train commandeered by the police (number 1102, Class 205).
- A Wickham trolley used in the school staff's attempt to join the chase.
- A pump action Handcar used by two junior girls to switch trains between tracks.

The extras on board the St Trinian's train were pupils from a local convent school. In addition, the school used for much of the filming was Little Abbey Preparatory School, near Liss. The school was in fact the other side of the moor from Longmoor. This was previously a boys preparatory school based at Burghclere near Newbury, which had merged with a girls preparatory school at the location at Liss nine months prior to the making of the film

== Reception ==
=== Box office ===
The film was among the 15 most popular films at the British box office in 1966.

=== Critical ===
The Monthly Film Bulletin wrote: "The humour, which ranges from the broadly vulgar to a species of unsophisticated wit, is variable, and the invention often sags heavily. But the hectic finale of a crazy mixed-up farcical chase on the railway is quite amusing and maintained at a cracking pace."

Variety wrote: "The fun often flags and is fairly predictable, but overall it keeps up a good level of slapstick comedy, garners plenty of yocks and should be a good bet for houses whose audiences demand no more than an evening's relaxation."

David Parkinson wrote in the Radio Times: "Frankie Howerd's limitations as a film actor are all too apparent in this feeble mix of vulgar comedy and Swinging Sixties satire. Richard Wattis does sterling work as the man from the ministry, but, try as they might, Dora Bryan, Reg Varney and Stratford Johns (providing the booming voiceover) can't hold a candle to the much missed Alastair Sim and Joyce Grenfell."
