= Flash Harry (St Trinian's) =

Character from St Trinian's

Henry Cuthbert Edwards a.k.a. Flash Harry is a fictional character from the St. Trinian's series of films who first appears in the 1954 The Belles of St Trinian's and who may also be a spiv. The term refers to "an ostentatious, loudly-dressed, and usually ill-mannered man". The best-known portrayer is George Cole in the 1950s–1960s films.

== Profile ==
In the St Trinian's films, Harry is a long-term associate of the girl pupils, a Cockney involved in all sorts of shady dealings. His father sold racecards and, when he was 12, Harry himself was employed as a boot polisher by Miss Fritton, headmistress of St Trinian's, and may be an antithesis of Harry Flashman (the bully) of the 1857 book Tom Brown's School Days. As an adult, Harry is one of the few whom the pupils trust: he helps to bottle and sell their gin, distilled in the school chemistry lab, and places bets on race horses for them. Harry also runs the St Trinian's Matrimonial Agency for the teenage Sixth Form girls, setting them up with wealthy men. He even runs a betting scam of his own.

By the time Amber Spottiswood (Dora Bryan) becomes headmistress, Harry's official connection to the school is as "chairman of the board of governors" and he earns money as a costermonger while the school is closed. He sets up a betting shop on the school grounds under the name Harry Hackett Ltd and takes bets from locals and pupils.

Harry appears to be quite well known in the criminal community, another crook (Lionel Jeffries) referring to him as "riff-raff".

== Portrayers ==
"Flash Harry" was played by George Cole in the first four St Trinian's movies.

- The Belles of St Trinian's, 1954. This centered on the kidnapping of a race horse and centered on the kidnapping of a race horse and featured Sid James of Carry On fame as a shady bookmaker. The 1956 comedy Dry Rot which followed a similar plot. James's played a character called Flash Harry, who had similarities to the earlier character.
- Blue Murder at St Trinian's, 1957
- The Pure Hell of St Trinian's, 1960
- The Great St Trinian's Train Robbery, 1966. Here he is referred to as "Harry Hackett", but this may be a pseudonym.

Joe Melia played the part in The Wildcats of St Trinian's in 1980.

Russell Brand played the role in the 2007 film, St. Trinian's.
