= Ronald Searle =

English artist and cartoonist (1920–2011)

Ronald Searle CBE RDI
- Searle in 2011
- Born: Ronald William Fordham Searle; 3 March 1920; Cambridge, England
- Died: 30 December 2011 (aged 91); Draguignan, Var, Provence, France
- Known for: Illustration, graphic artist, cartoons

Ronald William Fordham Searle CBE RDI (3 March 1920 – 30 December 2011) was an English artist and satirical cartoonist, comics artist, sculptor, medal designer and illustrator. He is perhaps best remembered as the creator of St Trinian's School and for his collaboration with Geoffrey Willans on the Molesworth series.

== Biography ==
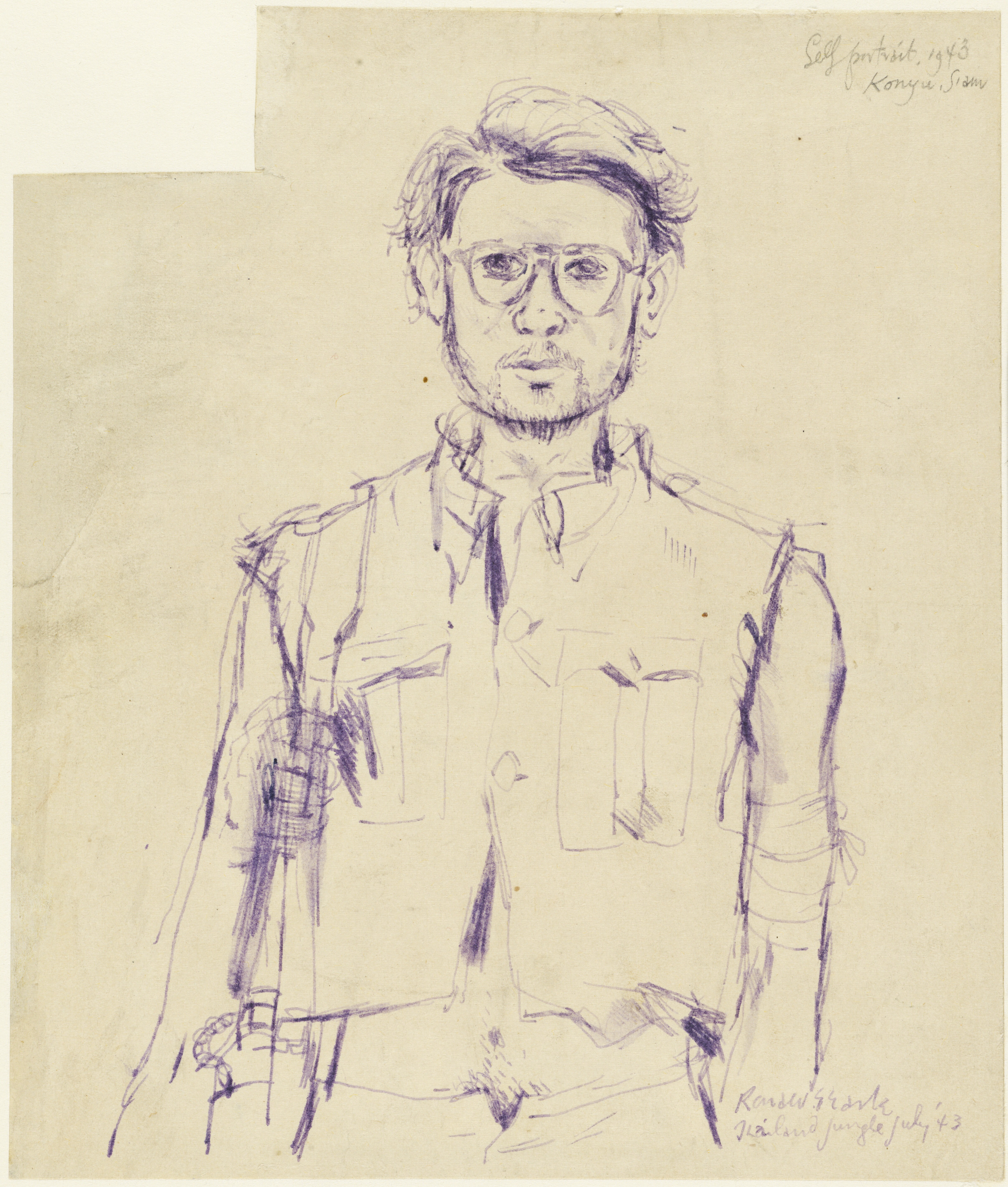
In the Jungle – Self Portrait, Konyu, Thailand Jungle, July 1943

Searle was born in Cambridge, England, where his father was a Post Office worker who repaired telephone lines. He started drawing at the age of five and left school (Central School – now Parkside School) at the age of 15. He trained at Cambridge College of Arts and Technology (now Anglia Ruskin University) for two years.

In April 1939, realizing that war was inevitable, he abandoned his art studies to enlist in the Royal Engineers. In January 1942, he was in the 287th Field Company, RE in Singapore. After a month of fighting in Malaya, he was taken prisoner along with his cousin Tom Fordham Searle, when Singapore fell to the Japanese. He spent the rest of the war as a prisoner, first in Changi Prison and then in the Kwai jungle, working on the Siam-Burma Death Railway. Searle contracted both beriberi and malaria during his incarceration, which included numerous beatings, and his weight dropped to less than 40 kilograms (approximately 6 stone 4 pounds). He was liberated in late 1945 with the final defeat of the Japanese. After the war, he served as a courtroom artist at the Nuremberg trials and later the Adolf Eichmann trial (1961).

He married the journalist Kaye Webb in 1947; they had twins, Kate and Johnny. In 1961, Searle moved to Paris, leaving his family; the marriage ended in divorce in 1967. Later he married Monica Koenig, a painter, theatre and jewellery designer. After 1975, Searle and his wife lived and worked in the mountains of Haute Provence, in the town of Tourtour in a house marked with a plaque in his honor.

Searle's wife Monica died in July 2011 and he himself died on 30 December 2011, aged 91.

== Early work as war artist during captivity ==
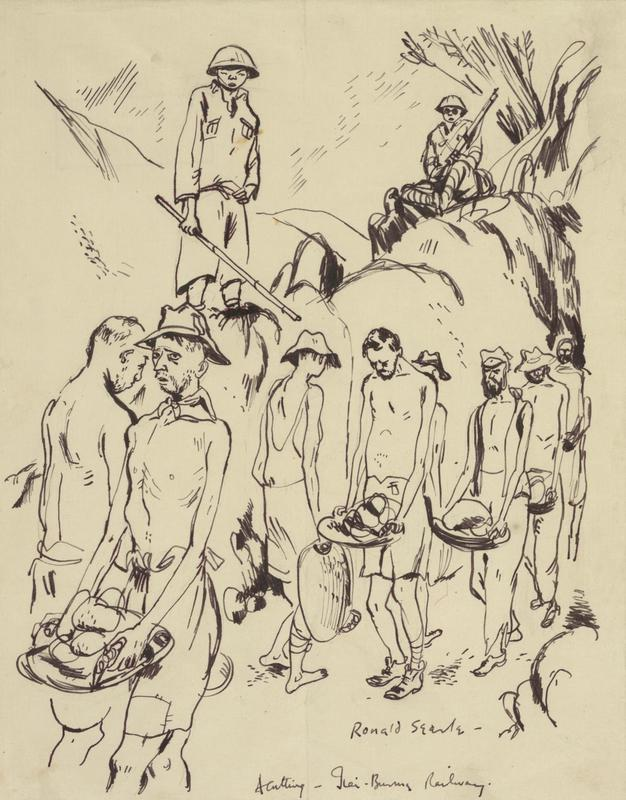
In the Jungle - Working on a Cutting. Rock Clearing after Blasting, 1943

Although Searle published the first St Trinian's cartoon in the magazine Lilliput in 1941, his professional career really begins with his documentation of the brutal camp conditions of his period as a prisoner-of-war of the Japanese in World War II in a series of drawings that he hid under the mattresses of prisoners dying of cholera. Searle recalled, "I desperately wanted to put down what was happening, because I thought if by any chance there was a record, even if I died, someone might find it and know what went on." But Searle survived, along with approximately 300 of his drawings. Liberated late in 1945, Searle returned to England, where he published several of the drawings in fellow prisoner Russell Braddon's The Naked Island. Another of Searle's fellow prisoners later recounted, "If you can imagine something that weighs six stone or so, is on the point of death and has no qualities of the human condition that aren't revolting, calmly lying there with a pencil and a scrap of paper, drawing, you have some idea of the difference of temperament that this man had from the ordinary human being."

Most of these drawings appear in his 1986 book, Ronald Searle: To the Kwai and Back, War Drawings 1939–1945. In the book, Searle also wrote of his experiences as a prisoner, including the day he woke up to find a dead friend on either side of him, and a live snake underneath his head:

You can’t have that sort of experience without it directing the rest of your life. I think that’s why I never really left my prison cell, because it gave me my measuring stick for the rest of my life... Basically all the people we loved and knew and grew up with simply became fertiliser for the nearest bamboo.

At least one of his drawings is on display at the Changi Museum and Chapel, Singapore, but the majority of his originals are in the permanent collection of the Imperial War Museum, London, along with the works of other POW artists. The best known of these are John Mennie, Jack Bridger Chalker, Philip Meninsky and Ashley George Old. In 2002, additional war drawings by Searle were discovered in Melbourne, Australia. They depict the Australian soldier Henry "Lofty" Cannon, whom Searle credits with saving his life while they were prisoners of war. These drawings are now held by the State Library of Victoria.

== Magazines, books, and films ==
Modern Classics reissue of Ronald Searle's St Trinian's drawings

Searle produced an extraordinary volume of work during the 1950s, including drawings for Life, Holiday and Punch. His cartoons appeared in The New Yorker, the Sunday Express and the News Chronicle. He compiled more St Trinian's books, which were based on his sister's school and other girls' schools in Cambridge. He collaborated with Geoffrey Willans on the Molesworth books (Down With Skool!, 1953, and How to be Topp, 1954), and with Alex Atkinson on travel books. In addition to advertisements and posters, Searle drew the title backgrounds of the Sidney Gilliat and Frank Launder film The Happiest Days of Your Life.

After moving to Paris in 1961, he worked more on reportage for Life and Holiday and less on cartoons. He also continued to work in a broad range of media and created books (including his well-known cat books), animated films and sculpture for commemorative medals, both for the French Mint and the British Art Medal Society. Searle did a considerable amount of designing for the cinema, and in 1965, he completed the opening, intermission and closing credits for the comedy film Those Magnificent Men in their Flying Machines as well as the 1969 film Monte Carlo or Bust! In 1975, the full-length cartoon Dick Deadeye, or Duty Done was released. It is based on the character and songs from H.M.S. Pinafore and other Gilbert and Sullivan operettas.

== Medallist ==
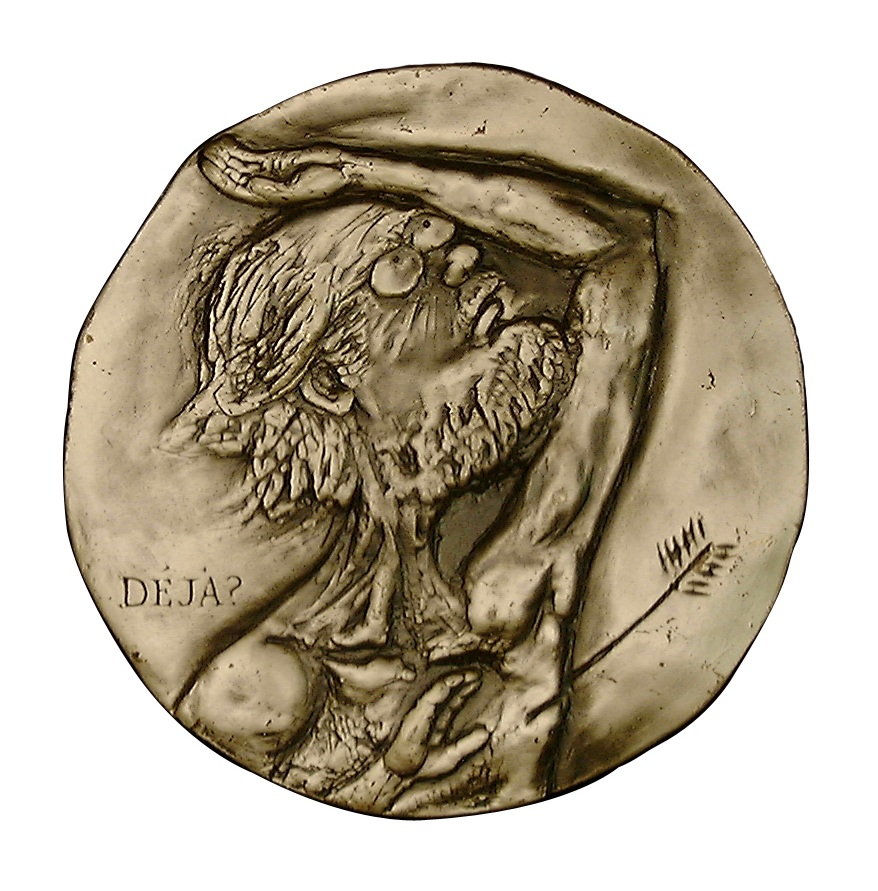
Medal by Searle titled Searle at 70. Struck by Thomas Fattorini Ltd

Searle designed the 1992 delegates medal for the FIDEM XXIII Congress London. It depicted a half-length bust of the renaissance medallist Pisanello and was struck by the Royal Mint. Other notable medals were "Searle at Seventy" (1990) and "Kwai 50th Anniversary" (1991), both struck by Thomas Fattorini Ltd, and "Charles Dickens" (1983) struck by the Birmingham Mint.

== Archives ==
In 2010, he gave about 2,200 of his works as permanent loans to Wilhelm Busch Museum, Hanover (Germany), now renamed Deutsches Museum für Karikatur und Zeichenkunst. Previously the summer palace of George I of Hanover, this museum also holds Searle's archives.

== Awards ==
Searle received much recognition for his work, especially in America, including the National Cartoonists Society's Advertising and Illustration Award in 1959 and 1965, the Reuben Award in 1960, their Illustration Award in 1980 and their Advertising Award in 1986 and 1987. Searle was appointed Commander of the Order of the British Empire in 2004. In 2007, he was decorated with one of France's highest awards, the Chevalier de la Légion d'honneur, and in 2009, he received the German Lower Saxony Order of Merit.

== Influence ==
Searle's satirical work is regarded as influential in the development of political and satirical cartooning in the United Kingdom, particularly among later twentieth- and early twenty-first-century artists. His work influenced cartoonists including Gerald Scarfe, Ralph Steadman. Chris Riddell and Martin Rowson. Critics and commentators have noted stylistic similarities between Searle, Scarfe, and Steadman, particularly in their use of scratchy linework and ink-splatter techniques.

Across the Atlantic, Searle was a friend of the satirical humorist S. J. Perelman. His work has had an influence, particularly on American cartoonists, including Edward Gorey, Pat Oliphant, Matt Groening, Hilary Knight, and the animators of Disney's 101 Dalmatians.

He was an early influence on John Lennon's drawing style which featured in the books In His Own Write and A Spaniard in the Works. Anglia Ruskin University has named the Ronald Searle Award for Creativity in the Arts in his honour.

== Bibliography ==
=== St Trinian's ===
- Hurrah For St Trinians, 1948
- The Female Approach: The Belles of St. Trinian's and Other Cartoons, 1950
- Back To The Slaughterhouse, and Other Ugly Moments, 1951
- The Terror of St Trinian's, or Angela's Prince Charming, 1952 (with Timothy Shy (D. B. Wyndham-Lewis))
- Souls in Torment, 1953 (preface by Cecil Day-Lewis)
- The St Trinian's Story, 1959 (with Kaye Webb)
- St Trinian's: The Cartoons, 2007
- St. Trinian's: The Entire Appalling Business, 2008

=== Molesworth ===
- Down With Skool!: A Guide to School Life for Tiny Pupils and Their Parents, 1953 (with Geoffrey Willans)
- How to be Topp: A Guide to Sukcess for Tiny Pupils, Including All There is to Kno About Space, 1954 (with Geoffrey Willans)
- Whizz for Atomms: A Guide to Survival in the 20th Century for Fellow Pupils, their Doting Maters, Pompous Paters and Any Others who are Interested, 1956 (with Geoffrey Willans) Published in the U.S. as Molesworth's Guide to the Atommic Age
- Back in the Jug Agane, 1959 (with Geoffrey Willans)
- The Compleet Molesworth, 1958 (collection) Molesworth (1999 Penguin reprint)

=== Other works ===
- Forty Drawings (1946)
- White Coolie, 1947 (with Ronald Hastain)
- This England 1946–1949, 1949 (edited by Audrey Hilton)
- The Stolen Journey, 1950 (with Oliver Philpot)
- An Irishman's Diary, 1950 (with Patrick Campbell)
- A Short Trot with a Cultured Mind, 1950 (with Patrick Campbell)
- Dear Life, 1950 (with H. E. Bates)
- Paris Sketchbook, 1950 (with Kaye Webb) (repr. 1958)
- A Sleep of Prisoners, 1951 (with Christopher Fry)
- Life in Thin Slices, 1951 (with Patrick Campbell)
- The Naked Island, 1952 (with Russell Braddon)
- It Must be True, 1952 (with Denys Parsons)
- London—So Help Me!, 1952 (with Winifred Ellis)
- The Diverting History of John Gilpin, 1953 (text by William Cowper)
- Looking at London and People Worth Meeting, 1953 (with Kaye Webb)
- Six Animal Plays, 1952 (text by Frank Carpenter)
- The Dark is Light Enough, 1954 (with Christopher Fry)
- Patrick Campbells Omnibus, 1954 (with Patrick Campbell)
- The Journal of Edwin Carp, 1954 (edited by Richard Haydn)
- Modern Types, 1955 (with Geoffrey Gorer)
- The Rake's Progress, 1955
- Merry England, Etc, 1956
- Anglo-Saxon Attitudes, 1956 (with Angus Wilson)
- The Big City or the New Mayhew , 1958 (with Alex Atkinson)
- The Dog's Ear Book, 1958 (with Geoffrey Willans)
- USA for Beginners, 1959 (with Alex Atkinson)
- Anger of Achilles: Homer's Iliad, 1959 (translation by Robert Graves)
- By Rocking Horse Across Russia, 1960 (with Alex Atkinson)
- Penguin Ronald Searle, 1960
- Refugees 1960: A Report in Words and Pictures, 1960 (with Kaye Webb)
- The Biting Eye of Andre Francois (1960)
- Which Way Did He Go?, 1961
- A Christmas Carol, 1961 (with Charles Dickens)
- The 13 Clocks and the Wonderful O, 1962 (with James Thurber)
- Searle in the Sixties, 1964
- From Frozen North to Filthy Lucre, 1964
- Those Magnificent Men in their Flying Machines, 1965
- Haven't We Met Before Somewhere?, 1966
- Searle's Cats, 1967
- The Square Egg, 1968
- Take One Toad, 1968
- This Business of Bomfog, 1969 (with Madelaine Duke)
- Monte Carlo Or Bust, 1969 (with E. W. Hildick)
- Hello, where did all the people go?, 1969
- The Second Coming of Toulouse-Lautrec, 1969
- Secret Sketchbook, 1969
- The Adventures of Baron Munchausen, 1969
- The Great Fur Opera: Annals of the Hudson's Bay Company 1670–1970, 1970 (with Kildare Dobbs)
- Scrooge, 1970 (with Elaine Donaldson)
- Mr. Lock of St. James's Street, 1971 (with Frank Whitbourn)
- The Addict, 1971
- More Cats, 1975
- Dick Dead Eye, 1975 (after Gilbert and Sullivan)
- Paris! Paris!, 1977 (with Irwin Shaw)
- Zodiac, 1977
- Ronald Searle, 1978
- The King of Beasts & Other Creatures, 1980
- The Situation is Hopeless, 1980
- Winning the Restaurant Game, 1980 (with Jay Jacobs)
- Too Many Songs by Tom Lehrer With Not Enough Drawings by Ronald Searle, 1981
- Ronald Searle's Big Fat Cat Book, 1982
- The Illustrated Winespeak, 1983
- Ronald Searle in Perspective, 1983
- Ronald Searle's Golden Oldies 1941–1961, 1985
- Something in the Cellar, 1986
- To the Kwai and Back: War Drawings 1939–1945 (1986)
- Ronald Searle's Non-Sexist Dictionary, 1988
- Ah Yes, I Remember It Well...: Paris 1961–1975, 1988
- Slightly Foxed But Still Desirable: Ronald Searle's Wicked World of Book Collecting, 1989
- Marquis De Sade Meets Goody Two-Shoes, 1994
- The Tales of Grandpa Cat, 1994 (with Lee Wardlaw)
- The Hatless Man, 1995 (with Sarah Kortum)
- A French Affair : The Paris Beat, 1965–1998, 1999 (with Mary Blume)
- Wicked Etiquette, 2000 (with Sarah Kortum)
- Ronald Searle in Le Monde, 2001
- Railway of Hell: A Japanese POW's Account of War, Capture and Forced Labour, 2002 (with Reginald Burton)
- Searle's Cats, 2005 (New and Expanded Edition, all illustrations are new)
- The Scrapbook Drawings", 2005
- Cat O' Nine Tales: And Other Stories, 2006 (with Jeffrey Archer)
- Beastly Feasts: A Mischievous Menagerie in Rhyme, 2007 (with Robert Forbes)
- More Scraps & Watteau Revisited, 2008
- Let's Have a Bite!: A Banquet of Beastly Rhymes, 2010 (with Robert Forbes)
- What! Already?: Searle at 90, 2010
- Les Très Riches Heures de Mrs Mole, 2011
- What Am I Still Doing Here?, 2011 (with Roger Lewis)

== See also ==
- Musée Tomi Ungerer/Centre international de l’illustration
- War artist
