= Prisoner-of-war camp =

Site for holding captured combatants

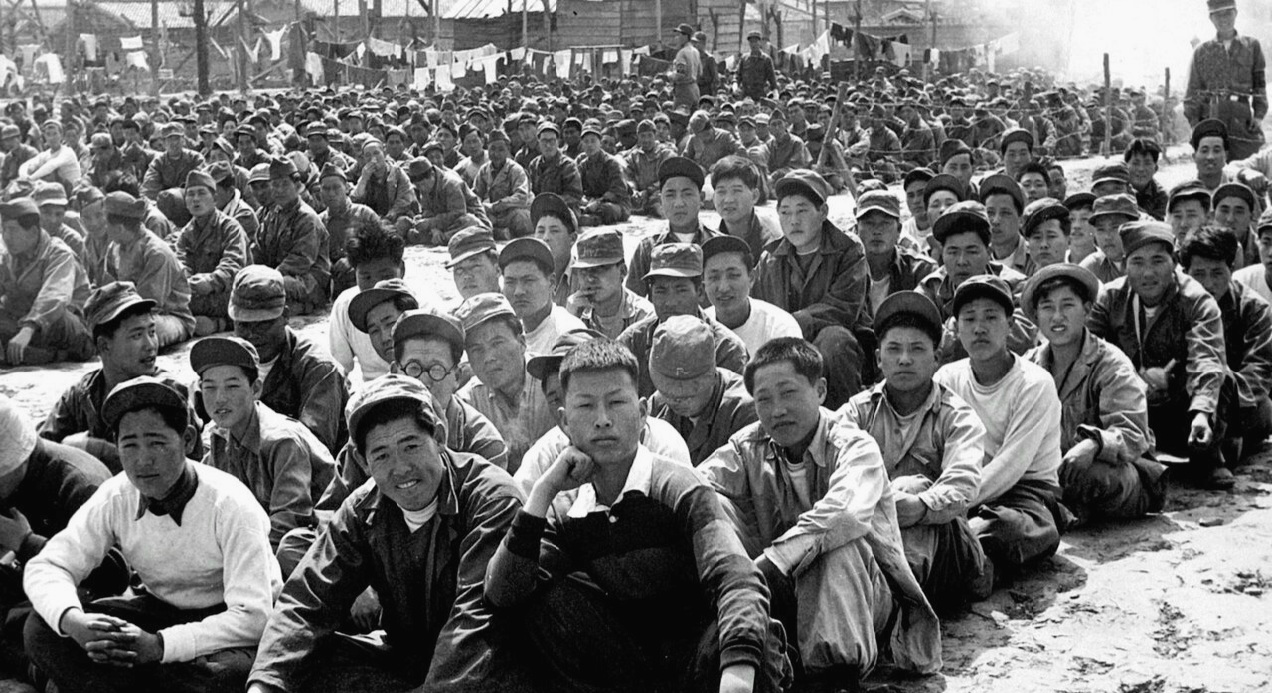
North Korean and Chinese Communist prisoners assembled at the United Nations' prisoner-of-war camp at Busan during the Korean War in 1951

A prisoner-of-war camp (often abbreviated as POW camp) is a site for the containment of enemy fighters captured as prisoners of war by a belligerent power in time of war.

There are significant differences among POW camps, internment camps, and military prisons. Purpose-built prisoner-of-war camps appeared at Norman Cross in England in 1797 during the French Revolutionary Wars and HM Prison Dartmoor, constructed during the Napoleonic Wars, and they have been in use in all the main conflicts of the last 200 years. The main camps are used for marines, sailors, soldiers, and more recently, airmen of an enemy power who have been captured by a belligerent power during or immediately after an armed conflict. Civilians, such as merchant mariners and war correspondents, have also been imprisoned in some conflicts. Per the 1929 Geneva Convention on Prisoners of War, later superseded by the Third Geneva Convention, such camps have been required to be open to inspection by representatives of a neutral power, but this hasn't always been consistently applied.

== Detention of prisoners of war before the development of camps ==
Before the Peace of Westphalia, enemy fighters captured by belligerent forces were usually executed, enslaved, or held for ransom. This, coupled with the relatively small size of armies, meant there was little need for any form of camp to hold prisoners of war. The Peace of Westphalia, a series of treaties signed between May and October 1648 that ended the Thirty Years' War and the Eighty Years' War, contained a provision that all prisoners should be released without ransom. This is generally considered to mark the point where captured enemy fighters would be reasonably treated before being released at the end of the conflict or under a parole not to take up arms. The practice of paroling enemy fighters had begun thousands of years earlier, at least as early as the time of Carthage but became normal practice in Europe from 1648 onwards. The consequent increase in the number of prisoners was to lead eventually to the development of the prisoner of war camps.

== Development of temporary camps ==
Following General John Burgoyne's surrender at the Battle of Saratoga in 1777, several thousand British and German (Hessian and Brunswick) troops were marched to Cambridge, Massachusetts. For various reasons, the Continental Congress desired to move them south. For this purpose, one of the congressmen offered his land outside of Charlottesville, Virginia. The remaining soldiers (some 2,000 British, upwards of 1,900 German, and roughly 300 women and children) marched south in late 1778—arriving at the site (near Ivy Creek) in January 1779. Since the barracks were barely sufficient in construction, the officers were paroled to live as far away as Richmond and Staunton. The camp was never adequately provisioned, but the prisoners built a theater on the site. Hundreds escaped Albemarle Barracks because of the shortage of guards. As the British Army moved northward from the Carolinas in late 1780, the remaining prisoners were moved to Frederick, Maryland; Winchester, Virginia; and perhaps elsewhere. No remains of the encampment site are left.

== First purpose-built camp ==
The earliest known purpose-built prisoner-of-war camp was established by the Kingdom of Great Britain at Norman Cross, in 1797 to house the increasing number of prisoners from the French Revolutionary Wars and the Napoleonic Wars. The prison operated until 1814 and held between 3,300 and 6,272 men.

== American Civil War camps ==
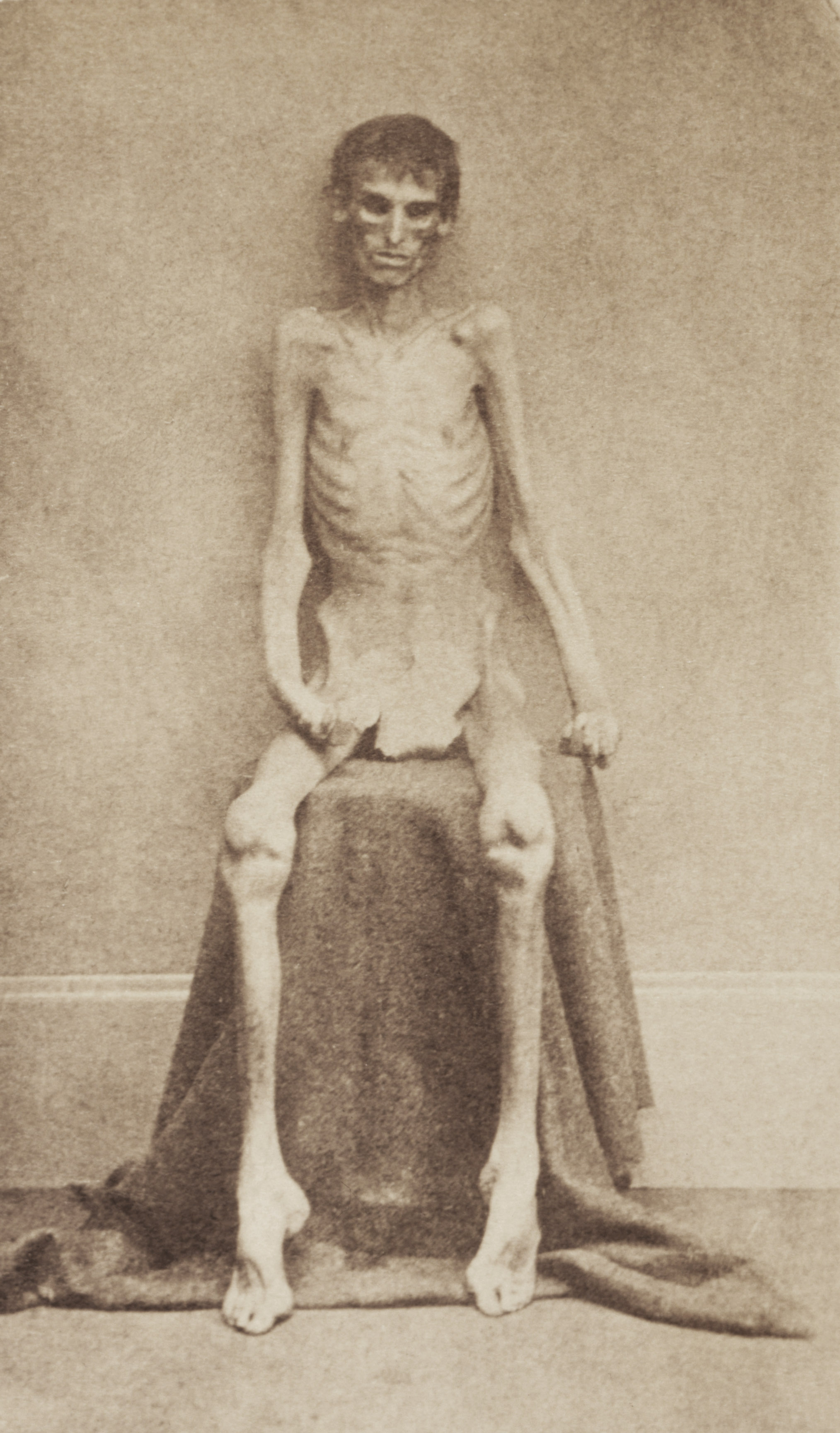
Union Army soldier on his release from a confederate prison around 1865

Lacking a means for dealing with large numbers of captured troops early in the American Civil War, the Union and Confederate governments relied on the traditional European system of parole and exchange of prisoners. While awaiting exchange, prisoners were confined to permanent camps.

Neither Union or Confederate prison camps were always well run, and it was common for prisoners to die of starvation or disease. It is estimated that about 56,000 soldiers died in prisons during the war; almost 10% of all Civil War fatalities. During a period of 14 months in Camp Sumter, located near Andersonville, Georgia, 13,000 (28%) of the 45,000 Union soldiers confined there died. At Camp Douglas in Chicago, Illinois, 10% of its Confederate prisoners died during one cold winter month; and the 25% death rate at Elmira Prison in New York State very nearly equaled that of Andersonville's.

== Boer War ==
During the Second Boer War, the British government established prisoner-of-war camps (to hold captured Boer belligerents or fighters) and concentration camps (to hold Boer civilians). In total, six prisoner-of-war camps were erected in South Africa and around 31 in overseas British colonies to hold Boer prisoners of war. The majority of Boer prisoners of war were sent overseas (25,630 out of the 28,000 Boer men captured during the fighting). After an initial settling-in period, these prisoner-of-war camps were generally well administered.

The number of concentration camps, all located in South Africa, was much higher and a total of 109 of these camps had been constructed by the end of the war - 45 camps for Boer civilians and 64 camps for black Africans. The vast majority of Boers held in the concentration camps were women and children. The concentration camps were generally poorly administered, the food rations were insufficient to maintain health, standards of hygiene were low, and overcrowding was chronic. Due to these conditions, thousands perished in the 109 concentration camps. Of the Boer women and children held in captivity, over 26,000 died during the war.

=== Boer War camps ===
Combatant	Name	Location	Notes	Image
Boer		Pretoria		
Boer		Waterval		
Boer		Nooitgedacht		
Boer		Barberton		
British		Bloemfontein	The camp was constructed in 1900 following the Battle of Paardeberg. It was primarily a concentration camp for civilians, of whom 26,370 Boer women and children, 14,154 black Africans, and 1,421 Boer men died during the camp's existence.	Bloemfontein concentration camp
British		Cape Town	Prisoner-of-war camps: Greenpoint Camp No. 1 and Camp No. 2.	
British		Simonstown	Prisoner-of-war camps: Bellevue Camp and South Camp.	
British		Natal	Prisoner-of-war camps: Ladysmith Camp (later turned into a concentration camp) and Umbilo Camp.	
Overseas		St. Helena	The first Boer POW contingent was sent to St. Helena on 11 April 1900, where they were incarcerated at the two camps on the island, Broadbottom and Deadwood.	
Overseas		Ceylon	Approximately 5,500 Boer prisoners of war were transported to Ceylon, with the first prisoners arriving on 9 August 1900. The majority of which were incarcerated at Diyatalawa, which opened 8 August 1900, with a convalescent camp at Mount Lavinia, housing 150 prisoners, opening on 17 December 1900, whilst a camp at Ragama, opened 8 January 1901, housing 150 dissidents and irreconcilables. On 10 September 1901 a parole camp for 80 prisoners, was established at Urugasmanhandiya, with a subsequent parole camp for 120 prisoners opening on 19 September 1901 at Hambantota.	
Overseas		India		
Overseas		Bermuda	Approximately 4,500 prisoners were sent to Bermuda between 28 June 1901 and 16 January 1902. The camps were situated on six islands located in the Great Sound (Burt Island, Darrell's Island, Hawkins Island, Hinson's Island, Morgan's Island and Tucker's Island).	
Overseas		Portugal		

== World War I ==
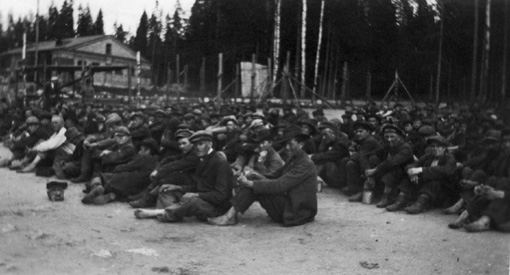
A group of "red prisoners" at the prison camp of Dragsvik, Ekenäs in 1918 after the Finnish Civil War

The first international convention on prisoners of war was signed at the Hague Peace Conference of 1899. It was widened by the Hague Convention of 1907. The main combatant nations engaged in World War I abided by the convention and treatment of prisoners was generally good. The situation on the eastern front was significantly worse than the western front, with prisoners in Russia at risk from starvation and disease. In total during the war about eight million men were held in prisoner of war camps, with 2.5 million prisoners in German custody, 2.9 million held by the Russian Empire, and about 720,000 held by Britain and France.

Permanent camps did not exist at the beginning of the war. The unexpectedly large number of prisoners captured in the first days of the war by the German army created an immediate problem. By September 1914, the German army had captured over 200,000 enemy combatants. These first prisoners were held in temporary camps until 1915, by which time the prisoner population had increased to 652,000 living in unsatisfactory conditions. In response, the government began constructing permanent camps both in Germany and the occupied territories. The number of prisoners increased significantly during the war, exceeding one million by August 1915 and 1,625,000 by August 1916, and reaching 2,415,000 by the end of the war.

=== Geneva Conference ===
The International Committee of the Red Cross held a conference in Geneva, Switzerland in September 1917. The conference addressed the war, and the Red Cross addressed the conditions that the civilians were living under, which resembled those of soldiers in prisoner of war camps, as well as "barbed wire disease" (symptoms of mental illness) suffered by prisoners in France and Germany. It was agreed at the conference that the Red Cross would provide prisoners of war with mail, food parcels, clothes, and medical supplies and that prisoners in France and Germany suffering from "barbed wire disease" should be interned in Switzerland, a neutral country.

A few countries were not on the same terms as Germany and Austria. For example, Hungary believed that harsh conditions would reduce the number of traitors.

The countries in the east continued their fight to help the Red Cross provide support to POWs. At the end of the war, a Franco-German agreement was made that both countries would exchange their prisoners, but the French kept a small number while the Germans released all French prisoners.

=== Krasnoyarsk ===
Krasnoyarsk in Siberia, Russia, was used after the Russian defeat to the Japanese in the Russo-Japanese War, as a base for military camps to train for future wars. Conditions there were dire and the detainees could be conscripted for war while they lived in concentration camps and prisons. Over 50,000 camp tenants were used for transportation, agriculture, mining and machinery production.

Throughout World War I, captured prisoners of war were sent to various camps including the one in Krasnoyarsk. There was a point where a large mix of nationalities was together in Krasnoyarsk which included Bulgarians, Czechs, Germans, and Poles. Many prisoners were nationalists, which led to violence within the camp. Militants would be forced to put down the instigators and keep the camp running.

== Polish–Soviet War ==
From autumn 1920, thousands of captured Red Army soldiers and guards had been placed in the Tuchola internment camp, in Pomerania. These prisoners lived in dugouts, and many died of hunger, cold, and infectious diseases. According to historians Zbigniew Karpus and Waldemar Rezmer, up to 2000 prisoners died in the camp during its operation.

In a joint work by Polish and Russian historians, Karpus and Rezmer estimate the total death toll in all Polish POW camps during the war at 16,000–17,000, while the Russian historian Matvejev estimates it at 18,000–20,000.

On the other side of the frontline about 20,000 out of about 51,000 Polish POWs died in Soviet and Lithuanian camps

While the conditions for Soviet prisoners were clearly exposed by the free press in Poland, no corresponding fact-finding about Soviet camps for Polish POWs could be expected from the tightly controlled Soviet press of the time. Available data shows many cases of mistreatment of Polish prisoners. There have been also cases of Polish POWs' being executed by the Soviet army, when no POW facilities were available.

== World War II ==
The 1929 Geneva Convention on the Prisoners of War established certain provisions relative to the treatment of prisoners of war. One requirement was that POW camps were to be open to inspection by authorised representatives of a neutral power.

- Article 10 required that POWs should be lodged in adequately heated and lighted buildings where conditions were the same as their own troops.
- Articles 27–32 detailed the conditions of labour. Enlisted ranks were required to perform whatever labour they were asked and able to do, so long as it was not dangerous and did not support the captor's war effort. Senior non-commissioned officers (sergeants and above) were required to work only in a supervisory role. Commissioned officers were unrequired to work, although they could volunteer. The work performed was largely agricultural or industrial, ranging from coal or potash mining, stone quarrying, or work in saw mills, breweries, factories, railway yards, and forests. POWs hired out to military and civilian contractors and were paid $.80 per day in scrip in U.S. camps. The workers were also supposed to get at least one day of rest per week.
- Article 76 ensured that POWs who died in captivity were to be honourably interred in marked graves.

Not all combatants applied the provisions of the convention. In particular the Empire of Japan, which had signed but never ratified the convention, was notorious for its treatment of prisoners of war; this poor treatment occurred in part because the Japanese viewed surrender as dishonourable. Prisoners from all nations were subject to forced labour, beatings, torture, murder, and even medical experimentation. Rations fell short of the minimum required to sustain life, and many were forced into labour. After March 20, 1943, the Imperial Navy was under orders to execute all prisoners taken at sea. Japanese POW camps are found throughout south-east Asia and the Japanese conquered territories.

=== Escapes ===
The Great Escape from Stalag Luft III, on the night of March 24, 1944, involved the escape of 76 Allied servicemen, although only three were able to avoid recapture.

The Cowra breakout, on August 5, 1944, is believed to be the largest escape of POWs in recorded history and possibly the largest prison breakout ever. At least 545 Japanese POWs attempted to escape from a camp near Cowra, New South Wales, Australia. Most sources say that 234 POWs were killed or committed suicide. The remainder were recaptured.

The Great Papago Escape, on December 23, 1944, was the largest POW escape to occur from an American facility. Over 25 German POWs tunneled out of Camp Papago Park, near Phoenix, Arizona, and fled into the surrounding desert. Over the next few weeks all were recaptured.

The escape of Felice Benuzzi, Giovanni ('Giuàn') Balletto, and Vincenzo ('Enzo') Barsotti from Camp 354 in Nanyuki, Kenya, on a lark to climb Mount Kenya is of particular note. The account is recorded by Benuzzi in No Picnic on Mount Kenya. After their attempt to climb Mount Kenya, the trio "escaped" back into Camp 354.

=== Role of the Red Cross ===
After World War I, when around 40 million civilians and prisoners could not be saved, the Red Cross was entrusted with more rights and responsibilities. In the course of World War II, it provided millions of Red Cross parcels to Allied POWs in Axis prison camps; most of these contained food and personal hygiene items, while others held medical kits. A special "release kit" parcel was also provided to some newly released POWs at the war's end. During the United States' call for war on Japan, the Red Cross stepped up to provide services for the soldiers overseas. A large number of provisions were needed for the soldiers in World War II over the 4 years that the Americans were involved. The American Red Cross and thirteen million volunteers had donated in the country with an average weekly donation of 111,000 pints of blood.

Nurses, doctors, and volunteer workers worked on the front lines overseas to provide for the wounded and the needy. This program saved thousands of lives as plasma donations were delivered to the camps and bases. However, the Red Cross only accepted donations from white Americans and excluded those of Japanese, Italian, German and African Americans. To combat this, activists tried to fight such segregation back home with arguments that blood of Whites and blood of Blacks is the same.

=== Allied camps ===
- Featherston prisoner of war camp, New Zealand
- List of POW camps in Australia
- List of POW camps in Britain
- List of POW camps in Canada
- List of POW camps in Kenya
- List of POW camps in occupied Germany
- List of POW camps in the United States
- List of POW camps in USSR
- Lom prisoner of war camp, Norway
- Skorpa prisoner of war camp, Norway
- Zonderwater POW camp in Cullinan, South Africa

=== Conditions in Japanese camps ===
In the lead-up to the Second World War, Japan had engaged in several conflicts aimed at expanding its empire, most notably the Second Sino-Japanese War. Although maintaining its neutrality at the outbreak of war in Europe, in 1941 the Japanese military launched surprise attacks on Hong Kong, Singapore, Thailand, the Philippines, and Pearl Harbor, which had brought the United States into the war on the side of the Allies. In 1942, after they had captured Hong Kong from the British, the Japanese established several prisoner-of-war camps in Kowloon to house Allied prisoners of war.

Believing it was shameful to be captured alive in combat, the Japanese ran their prisoner-of-war camps brutally, with many Allied prisoners of war dying in them. The Japanese field army code included a "warrior spirit", which stated that an individual must calmly face death. Those who disobeyed orders would be sentenced to death via decapitation, usually carried out by the katana of Japanese officers. The sword was seen as a symbol of wisdom and perseverance to the Japanese; they perceived death by it as an honor.

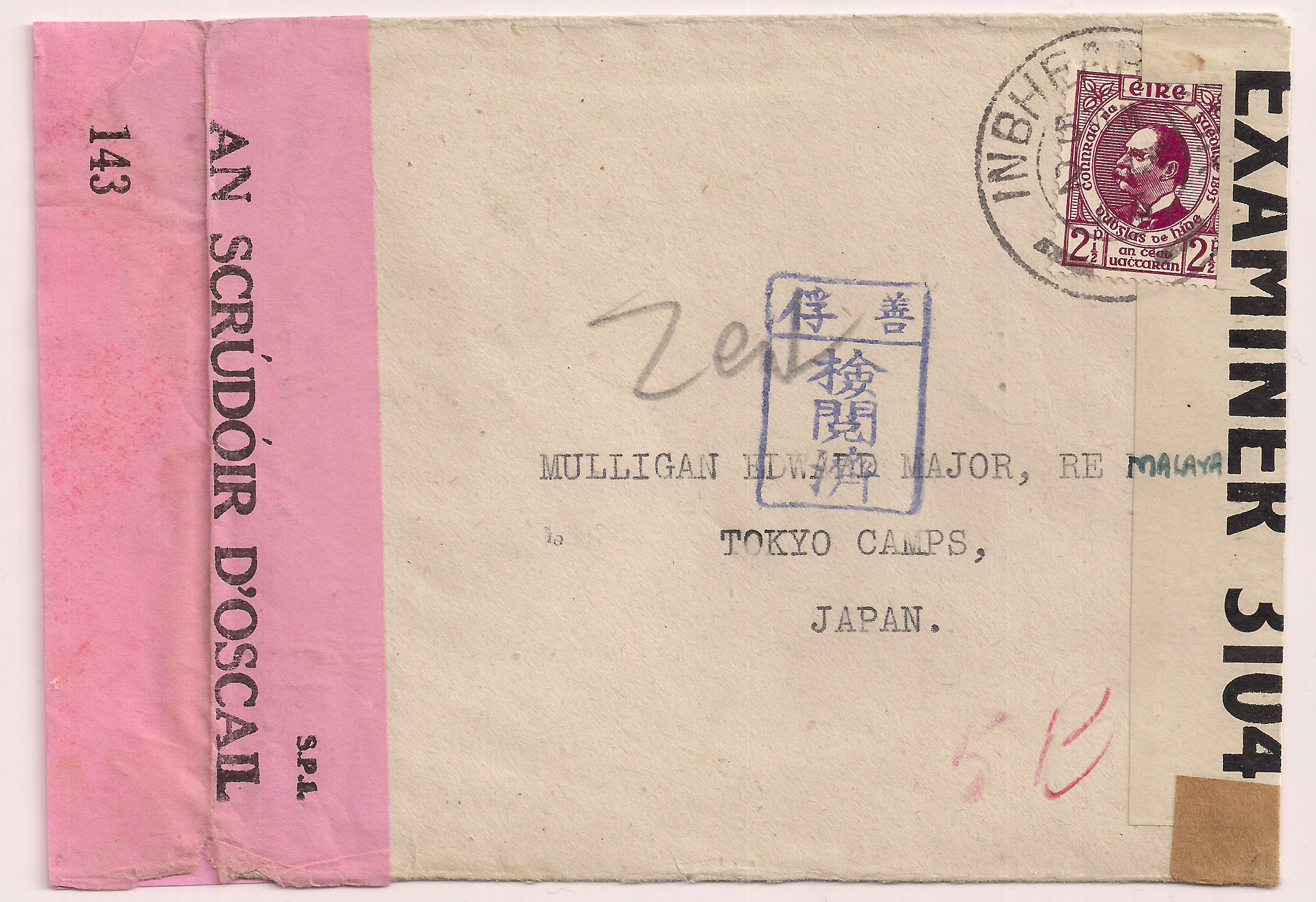
A triple-censored mail from Arklow, Ireland to an Irish prisoner of war in Japanese-occupied Malaya. The mail is covered with Irish, British and Japanese censorship.

Allied prisoners-of-war in Japanese camps were forced to engage in physical labour such as building bridges, erecting forts, and digging defence trenches. These prisoners received limited food, and once their military uniforms wore out, no replacements were given. Some brutal prison guards would answer requests for water with their beatings or rifle butts. Prisoners who were seen as no use, physically weak, or rebellious, would often be killed. At the end of the war, when the camp inmates were released, many had lost body parts, and many were starved and faced extreme emaciation. Some prisoners feared execution by the Japanese in response to American bombing. The brutality of the guards caused traumatized prisoners to suffer mental illnesses that persisted for decades afterward. In many cases, survivors of camps were traumatized or ended up living with a disability. Many survivors went home or to other areas of the world to have a successful life as a businessman, or they would devote themselves to helping poor people or people in the camps who were in need of support. A former PoW, Lieutenant Colonel Philip Toosey, stated that the Japanese committed brutal atrocities. Some of these included filling a prisoner's nose with water while the guards tied them with barbed wire, then they would stand on the prisoners, stepping on the wires. Or the guards would tie a prisoner on a tree by their thumbs, with their toes barely touching the ground, and leave them there for two days without food or water. After the two days of torture, the prisoner would be jailed prior to execution, after which their corpses would later be burnt.

Life in the POW camps was recorded at great risk to themselves by artists such as Jack Bridger Chalker, Philip Meninsky, John Mennie, Ashley George Old, and Ronald Searle. Human hair was often used for brushes, plant juices and blood for paint, and toilet paper as the "canvas". Some of their works were used as evidence in the trials of Japanese war criminals. Many are now held by the Australian War Memorial, State Library of Victoria, and the Imperial War Museum in London. The State Library of Victoria exhibited many of these works under the title The Major Arthur Moon Collection, in 1995.

In 2016, war historian Antony Beevor (who had recently completed his book The Second World War), said that the UK government had recently declassified information that some British POWs in some Japanese POW camps were subjected to being fattened, then cannibalised. Apparently, Winston Churchill had been aware of this atrocity but kept the information secret; he reasoned families would have been too distressed to learn that their sons had been the victims of cannibalism rather than killed in action.

More deaths occurred in Japanese POW camps than in any others. The Red Cross were not able to drop parcels into these camps because they were too well defended to fly over.

=== Canadian camps ===
The Second World War was mainly fought in Europe and western Russia, East Asia, and the Pacific; there were no invasions of Canada. The few prisoners of war sent to Canada included Japanese and German soldiers, captured U-boat crews, and prisoners from raids such as Dieppe and Normandy.

The camps meant for German POWs were smaller than those meant for Japanese prisoners of war and were far less brutal. German prisoners generally benefitted from good food. However, the hardest part was surviving the Canadian winters. Most camps were isolated and located in the far north. Death and sickness caused by the elements was common.

Many camps were only lightly watched, and as such, many Germans attempted escape. Tunnelling was the most common method. Peter Krug, an escapee from a prison located in Bowmanville, Ontario, managed to escape along the railroads, using forests as cover. He made his way to Toronto, where he then travelled to Texas.

Fighting, sometimes to the death, was somewhat common in the camps. Punishments for major infractions could include death by hanging. German POWs wore shirts with a large red dot painted on the back, an easily identifiable mark outside the camps. Therefore, escapees could be easily found and recaptured.

Japanese in Canada

In the wake of the Japanese attacking Hong Kong, the Philippines and Pearl Harbor in which 2000 Canadians were involved, Canadians put a large focus onto Japanese-Canadians even though innocent. Japan seemed to be able to attack along the Pacific and Canada could potentially be next. Canadian Prime Minister William Lyon Mackenzie King implemented the War Measures Act and the Defence of Canada Regulations; therefore, they could not get involved with Canadian services along with the Italians and Germans. The Nikkei (Canadians and Immigrants of Japanese origin) were stripped of possessions, which were later auctioned off without consent. The intense cold winters made it hard to live as the Nikkei were placed in camps; these campers were made of Japanese immigrants and Japanese-Canadians. They lived in barns and stables which were used for animals, therefore unsanitary. It took 5 years after the war for the Nikkei to gain their rights. Compensation was given but was not enough to cover the loss of properties. Over 22,000 Nikkei were put into these camps.

=== Axis camps ===
- List of POW camps in Germany and German-occupied countries (Stalags)
- List of Japanese war ships
- List of POW camps in Italy
- List of POW camps in Japan
- List of POW camps in Switzerland

=== Cigarettes as currency ===
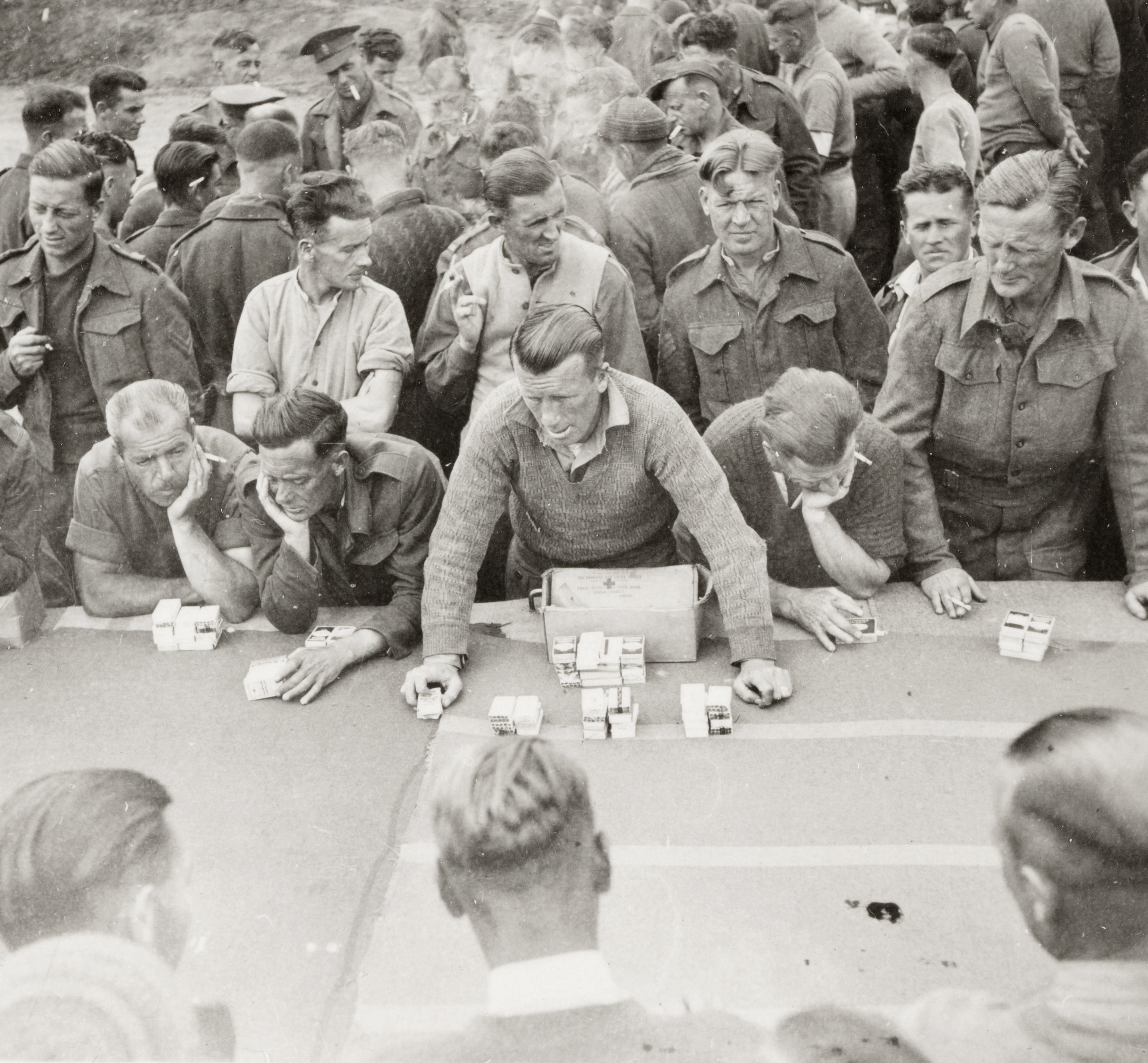
Soldiers gambling with cigarettes, Stalag 383 prisoner-of-war camp, Hohenfels, Germany, c. 1942

In many POW camps, cigarettes were widely used as currency known as 'commodity money'. They performed the functions of money as a medium of exchange because they were generally accepted among the prisoners for settling payments or debts, and the function of money as a unit of account, because prices of other goods were expressed in terms of cigarettes. Compared with other goods, the supply of cigarettes was more stable, as they were rationed in the POW camps, and cigarettes were more divisible, portable, and homogeneous.

== Korean War ==
=== U.N. camps ===
The International Red Cross visited United Nations-run POW camps, often unannounced, noting prisoner hygiene, quality of medical care, variety of diet, and weight gain. They talked to the prisoners and asked for their comments on conditions, as well as providing them with copies of the Geneva Convention. The IRC delegates dispersed boots, soap, and other requested goods.

A prison camp was established on the island of Koje-do, where over 170,000 communist and non-communist prisoners were held from December 1950 until June 1952. Throughout 1951 and early 1952, upper-level communist agents infiltrated and conquered much of Koje section-by-section by uniting fellow communists; bending dissenters to their will through staged trials and public executions; and exporting allegations of abuse to the international community to benefit the communist negotiation team. In May 1952, Chinese and North Korean prisoners rioted and took Brigadier General Francis T. Dodd captive.

In 1952 the camp's administration were afraid that the prisoners would riot and demonstrate on May Day (a day honoring Communism) and so United States Navy ships (such as the USS Gunston Hall) removed 15,000 North Korean and Chinese prisoners from the island and moved them to prison facilities at Ulsan and Cheju-do. These ships also participated in Operation Big Switch in September 1953 when prisoners were exchanged at the end of the war.

=== Communist camps ===
The Chinese operated three types of POW camps during the Korean war. Peace camps housed POWs who were sympathetic to communism, reform camps were intended for skilled POWs who were to be indoctrinated in communist ideologies and the third type was the normal POW camps. Chinese policy did not allow for the exchange of prisoners in the first two camp types.

While these POW camps were designated numerically by the communists, the POWs often gave the camps a colloquial name.

- Camp 1 – Changsong – near Camp 3 on the Yalu River.
- Camp 2 – Pyoktong – on the Yalu River.
- Camp 3 – Changsong – near Camp 1 on the Yalu River.
- Camp 4 – north of Camp 2
- Camp 5 – near Pyoktong.
- Camp 6 – P'yong-yang
- Camp 7 – near Pyoktong.
- Camp 8 – Kangdong
- Camp 9 – P'yong-yang.
- Camp 10 – Chon ma
- Camp 11 – Pukchin
- Camp 12 – P'yong-yang- (Peace Camp) was located in the northwestern vicinity of the capitol. Nearby were several other camps including PAK's Palace.
- Bean Camp – Suan
- Camp DeSoto – P'yong-yang locale – The camp was near to Camp 12.
- Pak's Palace Camp – P'yong-yang locale – Located in the northernmost area near the Capitol. The camp was near Camp 12.
- Pukchin Mining Camp – between Kunu-ri and Pyoktong – (aka. Death Valley Camp).
- Sunchon Tunnel – - (aka. Caves Camp)
- Suan Mining Camp – P'yong-yang
- Valley Camps – Teksil-li

== Vietnam War ==
=== South Vietnamese Army camps in South Vietnam ===
By the end of 1965, Viet Cong suspects, prisoners of war, and even juvenile delinquents were mixed together in South Vietnamese jails and prisons. After June 1965, the prison population steadily rose, and by early 1966, there was no space to accommodate additional prisoners in the existing jails and prisons. In 1965, plans were made to construct five POW camps, each with an initial capacity of 1,000 prisoners and to be staffed by the South Vietnamese military police, with U.S. military policemen as a prisoner of war advisers assigned to each stockade.

==== Prisons and jails ====
- Côn Đảo National Prison
- Chí Hòa National Prison
- Tam Hiep National Prison
- Thu Duc National Prison
- plus 42 Province jails

==== Camps ====
- Bien Hoa camp – in III Corps area was opened May 1966
- Pleiku camp – in II Corps area was opened August 1966
- Da Nang camp (Non Nuoc) – in I Corps area was opened in November 1966
- Can Tho camp – in IV Corps area was opened early 1967
- Qui Nhon (Phu Tai) – opened March 1968 (for female PoWs)
- Phú Quốc camp – off the coast of Cambodia, opened in 1968

=== North Vietnamese Army camps ===
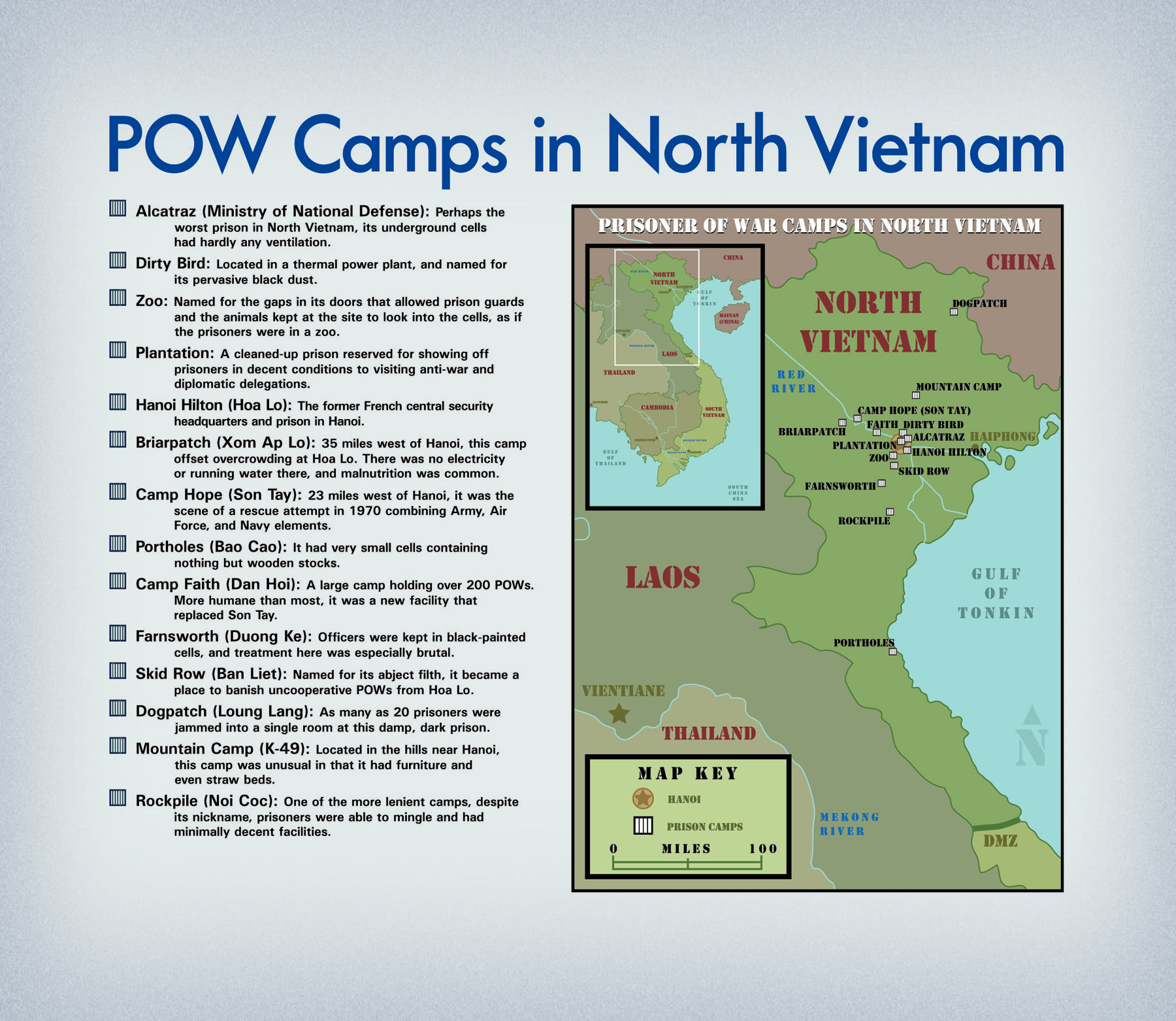
Map of North Vietnamese Army POW camps, along with descriptions

- "Alcatraz" – North Central Hanoi
- "Briarpatch" – 53 km (33 mi) WNW of Hanoi
- "Camp Faith" – 14 km (9 mi) West of Hanoi
- "Dirty Bird" – Northern Hanoi
- "Dogpatch" – 169 km (105 mi) NNE of Hanoi
- "Farnsworth" – 29 km (18 mi) SW of Hanoi
- "Hanoi Hilton" – Hoa Lo, Central Hanoi
- "Mountain Camp" – 64 km (40 mi) NW of Hanoi
- "Plantation – Northeast Hanoi
- "Rockpile" – 51 km (32 mi) South of Hanoi
- Sơn Tây – 37 km (23 mi) West of Hanoi
- "Skidrow" – 10 km (6 mi) SW of Hanoi
- "The Zoo" – SW suburb of Hanoi

== Yugoslav wars ==
=== Serb Camps ===
- Manjača camp – Banja Luka, Republika Srpska
- Sremska Mitrovica camp – Sremska Mitrovica, Vojvodina
- Stajićevo camp – Stajićevo, Vojvodina

=== Other Camps ===
- Čelebići prison camp – Konjic, Federation of Bosnia and Herzegovina
- Lapušnik prison camp – Kosovo

== Afghanistan and Iraq wars ==
The United States of America refused to grant prisoner-of-war status to many prisoners captured during its War in Afghanistan (2001–2021) and 2003 invasion of Iraq. This was mainly because it classed them as insurgents or terrorists, which did not meet the requirements laid down by the Third Geneva Convention of 1949 such as being part of a chain of command, wearing a "fixed distinctive marking, visible from a distance", bearing arms openly, and conducting military operations in accordance with the laws and customs of war.

The legality of this refusal has been questioned and cases are pending in the U.S. courts. In the Hamdan v. Rumsfeld court case, on June 29, 2006, the U.S. Supreme Court ruled that the captives at Guantanamo Bay detention camp were entitled to the minimal protections listed under Common Article 3 of the Geneva Conventions. Other captives, including Saddam Hussein, have been accorded POW status. The International Red Cross has been permitted to visit at least some sites. Many prisoners were held in secret locations (black sites) around the world. The identified sites are:

- Abu Ghraib prison – 32 km west of Baghdad, Iraq
- Bagram Air Base – near Charikar in Parvan, Afghanistan
- Camp Bucca – near Umm Qasr, Iraq
- Camp Delta – Guantanamo Bay, Cuba

== See also ==
- List of World War II prisoner-of-war camps in the United States
- American Civil War prison camps
- Finnish Civil War prison camps
- Internment camp
- List of prisoner-of-war escapes
- List of World War II POW camps
- Military prison
- Eden Camp Museum

== Bibliography ==
- Burnham, Philip. So Far from Dixie: Confederates in Yankee Prisons (2003)
- Byrne, Frank L., "Libby Prison: A Study in Emotions," Journal of Southern History 1958 24(4): 430–444. in JSTOR
- Cloyd, Benjamin G. Haunted by Atrocity: Civil War Prisons in American Memory (Louisiana State University Press; 2010) 272 pages.traces shifts in Americans' views of the brutal treatment of soldiers in both Confederate and Union prisons, from raw memories in the decades after the war to a position that deflected responsibility.
- Horigan, Michael. Elmira: Death Camp of the North (2002)
