= John Mennie =

Scottish artist

John George Mennie
- Born: 26 November 1911; Aberdeen, Scotland
- Died: 24 August 1982 (aged 70); Blair Atholl, Scotland
- Military career
- Allegiance: United Kingdom
- Branch: British Army
- Service years: 1940–1947
- Rank: Lance Bombardier
- Nickname: 'Jack'
- Unit: Royal Artillery
- Conflicts: World War II: Battle of Singapore
- Other work: Art teacher

John George Mennie, ARMS, D.A.(ABDN), (26 November 1911 – 24 August 1982) was a Scottish artist who came to public attention in 2011 for his many contemporaneous drawings of his life as a prisoner of war during the Japanese occupation of Singapore and of Thailand in World War II. The drawings were made in secret depicting scenes of daily life and personalities in the camps in Singapore and Thailand, working on the Death railway. They also uniquely documented the Selarang Square Squeeze when some 17,000 prisoners were forced to crowd in the barracks square for nearly five days with little water and no sanitation until they signed a 'promise not to escape'.

Mennie's drawings were donated to the archive at the Imperial War Museum, but came to wider public notice when a selection from a separate source were featured on an episode of the BBC television programme Antiques Roadshow, filmed on 18 September 2011 at Manchester.

== Early life ==
John Mennie was born at 28 Clarence Street, Aberdeen, Scotland, on 26 November 1911 to Robert and Margaret Mennie. He was known to family and friends as Jack. He trained at Gray's School of Art in Aberdeen and at Westminster School of Art in London. After graduation he worked as a commercial artist in London for eight years until he enlisted in the army in 1940.

== WWII – Singapore and Thailand ==
Mennie joined the Royal Artillery in 1940 and was posted in September 1941 to Singapore (No. 1604539 in the 2nd Heavy Anti-Aircraft Regiment, Hong Kong-Singapore Royal Artillery). By the time of his capture on 15 February 1942 he had been promoted to lance bombardier. He was captured when Singapore surrendered to the Japanese forces in February 1942 and he was a prisoner of war until August 1945. He was demobbed in 1946 and returned to Aberdeen.

Mennie described his four-year PoW itinerary in a part of a letter to his mother written at Pratchi camp, Thailand, 5 September 1946.

He was in Changi Prison, Singapore, from February until October 1942, when he was transferred to Thailand on 5-day rail journey, arriving on 3 November. Then after a 6-day voyage on a barge up the Mae Klong river from Kontonburi was dumped on the side of a mountain with jungle starting from the bank. They had to clear a space and build a camp from the material around them, bamboo. At 'Kano' their task was to build 10 miles of railway along the mountain. He noted that of the 600 men, 125 were dead within 6 months.

He left Kano camp in August 1943 and went to Chungkai, 2 miles from Konton buri until May 1944. He was then moved to Nakom Paton, a place that he cheerfully described to his mother as [ having ] the second largest Buddhist temple in the world.

In January 1945 he was moved 'up country' to a camp called Tamawan. In May 1945 he was moved again, a 6-day journey to Pratchi camp where the prisoners had to tunnel into a mountain to make bomb proof magazines for ammunition.

=== Secret drawings ===
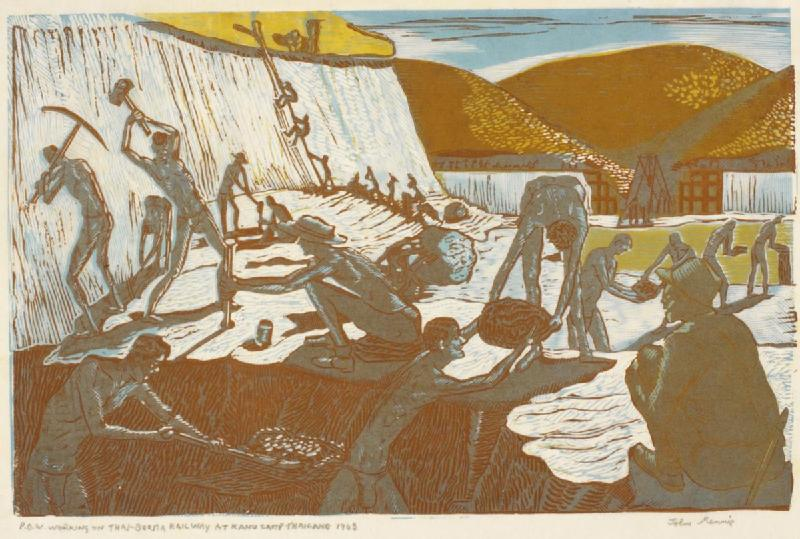
Mennie's depiction of emaciated prisoners working on the Death Railway.

Mennie was one of a few brave prisoners that recorded life in the Japanese POW camps at great risk to themselves. Others included Jack Bridger Chalker, Philip Meninsky, Ashley George Old and Ronald Searle.

Mennie created two series of secret drawings while he in the camps:

- a documentary series detailing Japanese barbarity and the conditions endured by prisoners. He secreted these in the stem of a bamboo walking stick;
- a set of eighty sketch portraits of his comrades which he secreted under the piece of wood on which he kept his mess tin. These were eventually discovered by the Japanese, removed, stolen back from the Japanese camp office, made their way back to the UK and were posted to his mother's address in Aberdeen.

His meagre materials were pen, pencil, scraps of paper and card including 'white space' torn from manuals, plus a Chinese 'Children's watercolour paintbox'.

Mennie's drawings in the camps include:

- Selerang Square Squeeze, Singapore, September 1942. Captioned 16,500 British + Australian POW from Changi area herded in Selerang Square for four days to force them to sign documents promising not to attempt to escape.
- L/Col Dunlop A.I.F Medical Corps, performing operation in the open at Kanung PoW camp, Thailand May 1943
- Servicemen depicted carol singing in a bid to keep their spirits up, Christmas Eve, 1943. Dysentery Ward. Ching-Kai POW Camp, Thai-Burma Railway

=== Imperial War Museum ===
Mennie created many drawings during his time as a prisoner of war, and in 1978 over fifty pieces were donated to the archives in the Imperial War Museum, London.

== Art and teaching career ==
After graduation from the Westminster School of Art in circa 1931 he worked as a commercial artist in London for eight years until he enlisted in the army in 1940.

In 1947, after his demobbed from the army, Mennie started teaching life drawing and painting at the Marylebone Institute of Adult Education, later run by the Inner London Education Authority. He also ran an 'art stall' at Nicolls Antique Market in Portobello Road.

Mennie was a member of the Royal Society of Miniature Painters, Sculptors and Gravers.

== Personal life ==
He met Dorothy (Bertha Dorothy Linter Cole) when she enrolled at one of his evening classes at the Marylebone Institute of Adult Education, and she became an accomplished artist. They first lived at The Studio, Holland Park Avenue. Later they lived at Studio House, Colville Road, London W11 which had a purpose-built studio with a partial glass roof on the top floor.
