= Meninsky =

Meninsky is a surname. Notable people with the surname include:

- Bernard Meninsky (1891–1950), British artist
- Carla Meninsky (fl. 1977), American video game designer and programmer
- Philip Meninsky (1919–2007), British artist, son of Bernard
