= Morris Kestelman =

English painter (1905–1998)

- Born: 5 October 1905; London, England
- Died: 15 June 1998 (aged 92); London, England
- Education: Central School of Art and Design; Royal College of Art
- Known for: Art teacher; painter

Morris Kestelman (5 October 1905 – 15 June 1998) was a British artist and teacher. Kestelman was a full-time art teacher and only began exhibiting on a regular basis towards the end of his life and is now best known for the paintings of working people and landscapes he produced during the 1940s and 1950s as well as his later abstract work.

== Biography ==
Kestelmans' parents were Jewish immigrants from Russia and he was born and raised in the midst of the Jewish community in Whitechapel in the East End of London, where his father worked as a cabinet maker. Kestelman obtained a scholarship to the Central School of Art and Design in 1922, where his teachers included both A.S. Hartrick and Bernard Meninsky. Meninsky introduced Kestelman, who became a lifelong friend, to the London Group and he, Kestelman, helped with the organization of the Group's 1926 exhibition. Hartricks' teaching led Kestelman to an appreciation of French art and he would visit France for extended periods most years from 1930 onwards.

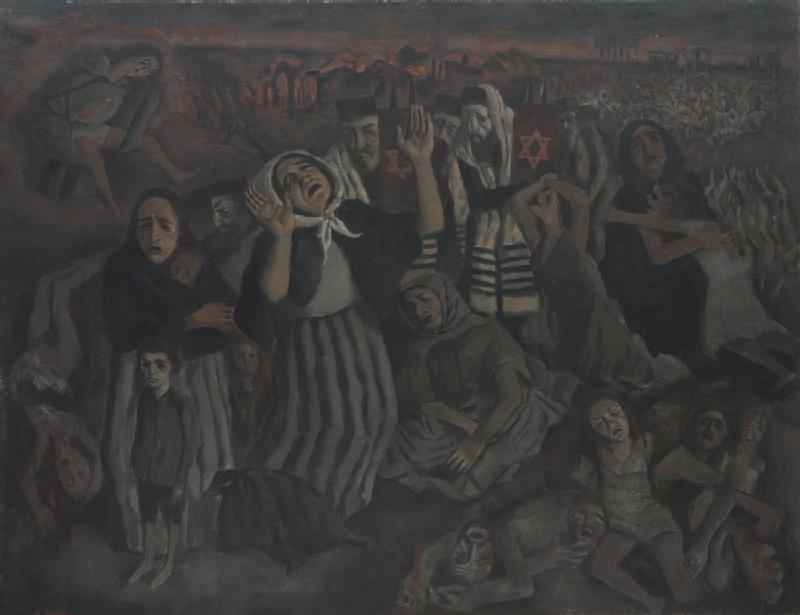
Lama Sabachthani (why have you forsaken me?) (Art.IWM ART 16786)

After graduating from the Central School in 1925, Kestelman enrolled at the Royal College of Art where he studied until 1929. During this time he developed a talent for theatre and stage design such that he created a number of costume designs for a 1929 production of The Magic Flute at Birkbeck College. Later he created sets for Carmen at Sadler's Wells in 1940 and for several productions by the Old Vic Company including the 1944 staging of Richard III starring Ralph Richardson, Sybil Thorndike and Laurence Olivier at the New Theatre. The publisher Noel Carrington commissioned Kestelman to produce a large series of pastel drawings for a book on the Bertram Mills Circus. The book was never published due to the outbreak of the Second World War.

During World War Two, Kestelman served as a full-time air-raid warden and also drew scenes of workers at an aircraft repair factory. One of these drawings was subsequently purchased by the War Artists' Advisory Committee and is now held by the Imperial War Museum. During the War, in 1943, when reports of the Holocaust first reached Britain, Kestelman responded with the painting Lama Sabachthani (Why have you forsaken me?), whose title is taken from a line in Psalm 22. The painting was first exhibited at the 1943 For Liberty exhibition organised by the Artists' International Association in the shelter constructed on the bomb site of the John Lewis department store on Oxford Street in central London.

After teaching at Wimbledon School of Art, in 1951 Kestelman secured the post of Head of the Painting and Sculpture School at the Central School of Art and Design. He held this post until 1971. Although during this period his time for painting was largely restricted to the college holidays, he still made time to experiment with his art and developed a highly abstract style. Murals by Kestelman were included in exhibitions at the Victoria & Albert Museum in both 1946 and 1960. Memorial exhibitions for Kestelman were held at the Boundary Gallery and at the Friends Room of the Royal Academy in 2001. Further exhibitions of his work were held at Lauderdale House in 2002 and 2003 and at the London Jewish Cultural Centre in 2004. Kestelman also exhibited at the Royal Academy, with the London Group and with the New English Art Club.

Kestelman married Dorothy Mary Creagh, a dress designer, in 1936 and the couple had one child, the actress Sara Kestelman.

== Memberships & Awards ==
- 1951: Member, London Group
- 1983: Abbey Major Painting Prize,
- 1986: Elected Senior Member of the Royal Academy,
