= Ernest Warwick =

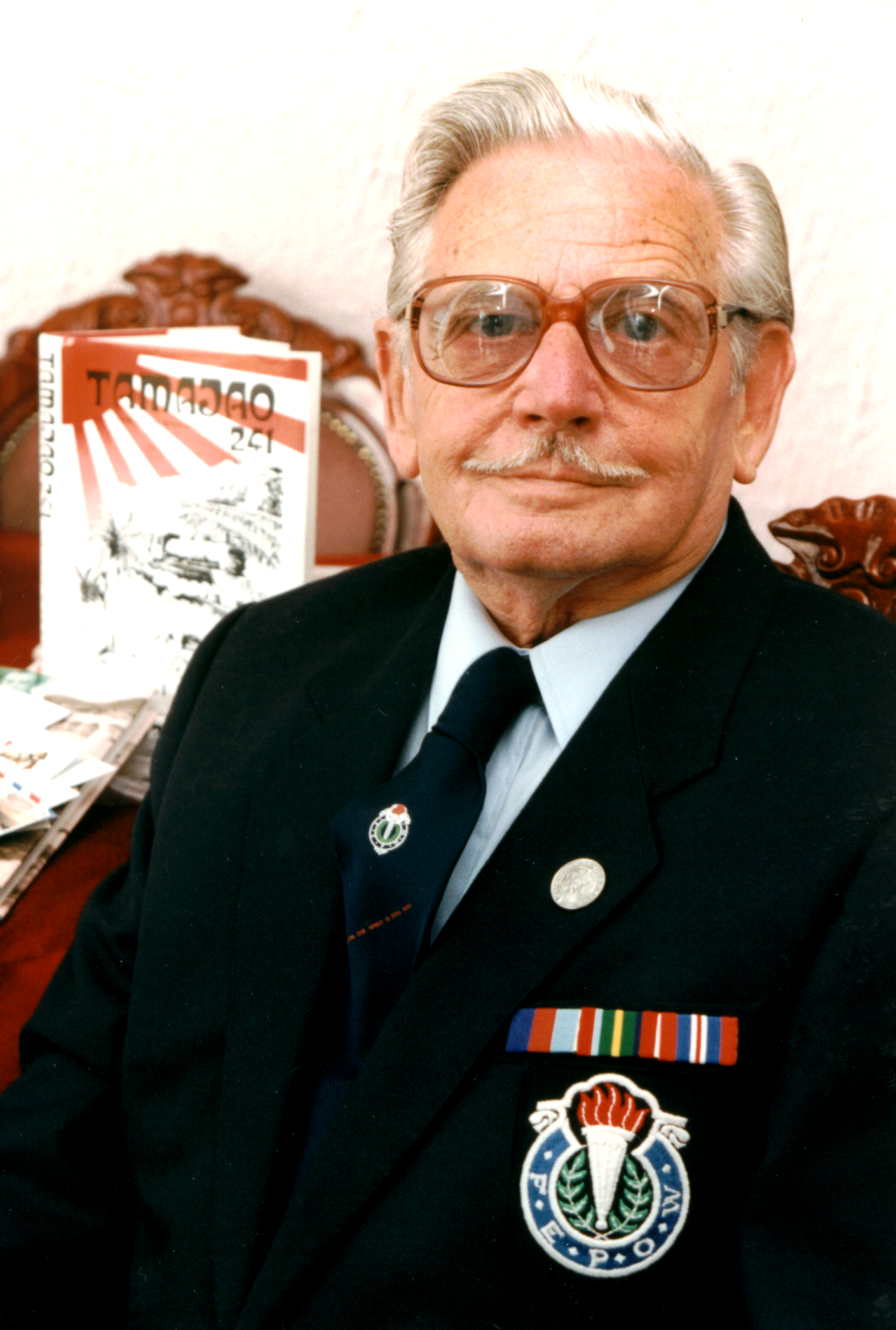
- Ernest Warwick with his book 'Tamajao 241: A camp on the River Kwai'
- Born: 12 April 1918; Brighton, England
- Died: 14 January 2009 (aged 90)
- Occupation: Author
- Writing career
- Genre: War
- Subject: Captivity on the Burma Railway of death
- Notable work: Tamajao 241: A POW camp on the River Kwai
- Military career
- Branch: British Army
- Service years: 1939–1945
- Rank: Private
- Unit: Suffolk Regiment
- Conflicts: Second World War: Battle of Singapore
- Website: tamajao241.org.uk

Ernest Warwick (1918–2009) was a British author, prisoner of war and survivor of the Burma to Siam death railway.

== Biography ==
Ernest Edward Lawrence Warwick was born in Brighton in 1918 towards the end of the first World War. He had a tough upbringing through the slump and poverty of the thirties. The eldest of eight children, with four brothers and three sisters, he was forced to leave school at 13 years of age after his father had been killed the day before in a road accident.

At the outbreak of World War 2 in 1939, he was called up and, after eight weeks basic training in the Essex Regiment, he was posted to the Fourth Battalion of the Suffolk Regiment, HQ Company, Intelligence Section for the duration of World War 2. This formed part of the 18th Infantry (Combat) Division of the British Army.

Serving as a private soldier, fighting on the streets in the brief and bloody 17-day battle for Singapore (which ended in the ignominious surrender of the Island – the 'fortress that never was'), he was wounded in action and taken Prisoner of War on the 15 February 1942. He spent 3 years and 8 months as a Japanese Prisoner of War, the majority of this on the infamous "railway of death" in Thailand. Saved from virtually certain death by the timely dropping of the Atom Bomb on Japan, which led to the almost immediate unconditional surrender of the Japanese. In August 1945 he was flown to a hospital in Rangoon, Burma weighing just over 6 stone (84lbs).

He was awarded The 1939–1945 Star, The Pacific Star (for the 17-day bloody battle of Singapore) and the 1939–1945 War Medal.

Throughout the post-war years he had a variety of jobs in industry, culminating in his position as deputy head porter at the General Hospital in Rochford for eight years until his retirement in 1983. He lived with his family in the village of Ashingdon in Essex.

Ernest was haunted by his years in captivity all his life and used a wheelchair as a direct result of brutal torture and ill-treatment at the hands of the Japanese in the grim jungle death camps alongside the River Kwai.

"Mr. Ernest Warwick, suffered badly at the hands of the Japanese and came out of a Japanese camp, as my right hon. Friend has described, broken in health. But the remarkable thing about such men is that they were not broken in spirit and managed to survive because their spirit was not broken."

In no way did he glorify war, but felt that as a proud nation we should always remember and honour our dead, who gave so much that we might live.

Between 1985 and 1987 Ernest wrote, and then in 1987 published, his first and only book Tamajao 241 : A POW camp on the River Kwai. It is based solidly on his own experiences in captivity. His story was written as a tribute to his dead comrades and to expose to the world the appalling inhumanity of the Japanese and Koreans during World War 2.

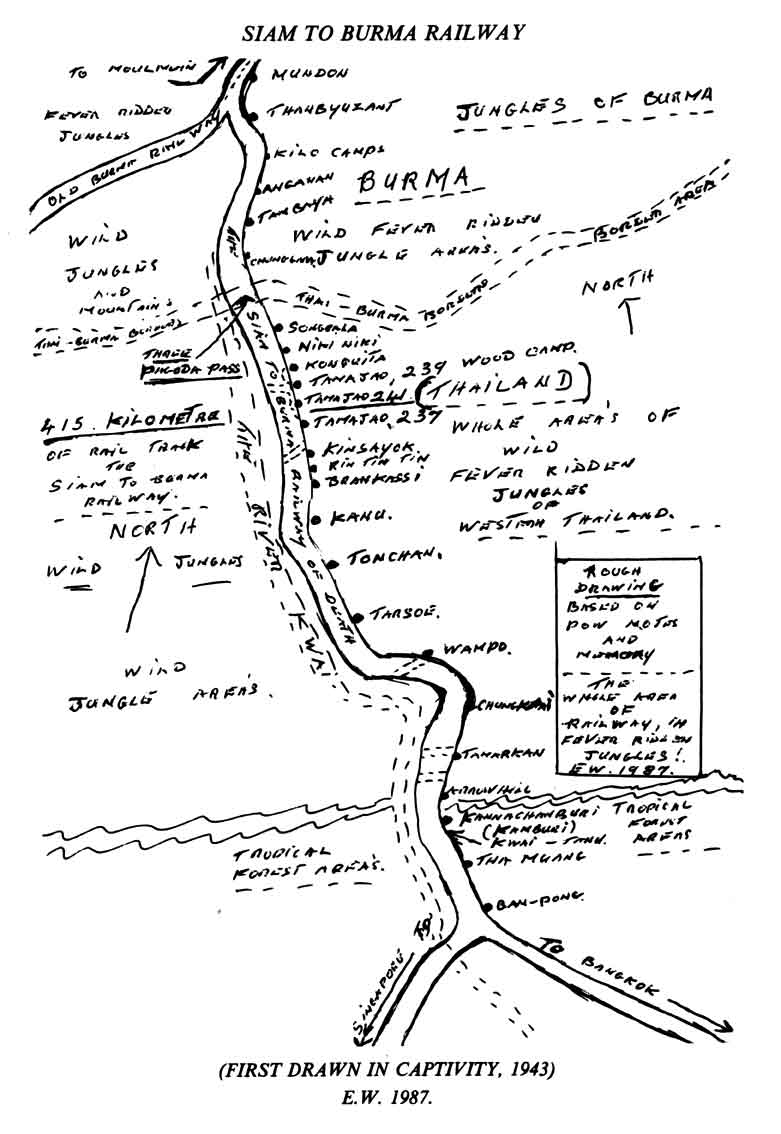
Map of POW camps along the Siam to Burma railway

== Incident at the docks ==
Daily work parties were sent from Changi to the city of Singapore in overcrowded lorries, to work on the docks loading and unloading ships.

At the docks Ernest witnessed an armed guard force an old Chinese lady, who had been giving cakes to Ernest and some of the other prisoners, to hold a metal bar above her head while he beat her about the face with his belt until she bled.

Ernest intervened by striking the guard, which subsequently resulted in him being punished by being roped to a tree for 5 days and 5 nights without food or water. At sunrise every day the Japanese guards would pray to Emperor Hirohito and then beat Ernest into unconsciousness.

They threatened to behead Ernest by a sword, but changed their minds and instead sentenced him to 28 days in a metal tomb at the Japanese punishment centre.

== Portrait by Ashley George Old ==
The portrait of Warwick by Ashley George Old here featured in an article in The Echo (Essex) on Monday 12 August 1985 that recounted how Warwick and Old were reunited after 41 years.

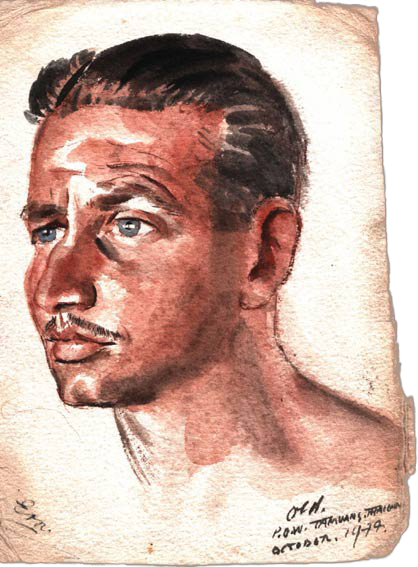
Ernest Warwick painting by Ashley George Old

== Later life ==
In his later life as an author and campaigner for ex-fepow's in their plight for compensation from the Japanese government, Ernest was interviewed on the subject by national press and for local and national TV news. He appeared in Channel 4's scars of war documentary recounting his experiences in captivity. Also he was flown to New York to give evidence in federal court on his experiences on the River Kwai in a case against Sony.
