= Arthur Moon =

Australian army doctor (1902–1973)

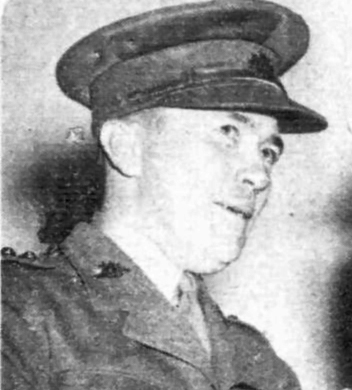
- Captain Arthur Alexander Moon, 24 Field Ambulance AIF, 1940
- Born: 17 May 1902; East Maitland, New South Wales
- Died: 28 October 1973 (aged 71)
- Occupation: army medical officer
- Known for: saving the lives of prisoners during World War Two

Major Arthur Moon (17 May 1902 – 28 October 1973) was an Australian army doctor who saved the lives of dozens of Far East prisoners of war while the Thailand-Burma Railway was being constructed during World War II.

== Early life ==
Moon was born on 17 May 1902 in East Maitland, New South Wales. By his early twenties, he had embarked on a medical career as a gynecologist and obstetrician.

== Military service ==
Moon enlisted in the Second Australian Imperial Force in 1940. Initially, he was a member of 2/4 Field Ambulance in the Middle East and deployed to Syria. There, he transferred to the 2/2 Casualty Clearing Station (CCS). In February 1942, Moon and Colonel Ernest "Weary" Dunlop sailed from Suez and landed in Java to honour a British undertaking to assist the Dutch in defence of Java. However, on 6 March, the Dutch capitulated, and the Australians, known as the “Black” Force, became prisoners of war.

A General Hospital was established with 23 officers, including Arthur Moon as a Medical Officer. In January 1943, a party of around 900 POWs, known as the “Dunlop” Force, was assembled to move to Thailand under the command of "Weary" Dunlop.

The force arrived at Banpong in Thailand on 24 January and was trucked to Tarsau. From Tarsau, the Force moved on foot approx 25 km to their first work area at Konyu, where they arrived with 875 POWs.

Moon moved to Hintok Mountain Camp in early April and was sent to Tamarkan to take up the post of Senior Medical Officer. He took up the post on 1 May 1943, where he took charge of a camp that was not a proper hospital as it remained essentially unchanged from when the bamboo huts served as the quarters for POW workers that preceded them. Here, Moon worked under a British Territorial Officer, Lt Col Philip Toosey, who was well-ordered and disciplined, which helped with hygiene and the organisation of Moon's medical staff, mainly enlisted soldiers.

On 3 May, the first party of sick men arrived by barge at Tamarkan, and after this, about 100 a day came. Many were delivered at night and left in the rice fields, where parties had to be sent out to find them.

Moon was also at Chungkai and Tamuang at various times.

== Record of conditions and atrocities ==
Moon is credited with causing one of the most comprehensive records of wartime Far East POW camp conditions and atrocities to come into being. He enlisted four prisoners with artistic skill, Ashley George Old, Jack Bridger Chalker, Philip Meninsky, and Keith Neighbour, to create paintings of the camps, prisoners, and injuries. The artists undertook this work in circumstances of extreme difficulty and danger. Many of these paintings were buried at Moon's final camp, recovered after the war, and archived by the State Library of Victoria.

In 1995, an exhibition of the works was held under the title 'The Major Arthur Moon Collection.' The collection catalogue cover shows a painting of a beckoning hand titled 'Bomb wound (air attack)' by Old. Compared to Picasso's Guernica, the narrative is an extraordinary image of war.

Major Arthur Moon Collection Exhibition Catalogue Cover

The Australian War Memorial holds photographs of Moon operating in the camps. Arthur Moon Papers, Letters, and Medical Reports, including the diagrams and maps of soldiers' burial sites at the Tamarkan POW camp, are held by The State Library of New South Wales, MLMSS 4234.
