= Far East prisoners of war =

British term during WWII

Far East prisoners of war is a term used in the United Kingdom to describe former British and Commonwealth prisoners of war held in the Far East during the Second World War. The term is also used as the initialism FEPOW, or as the abbreviation Far East POWs.

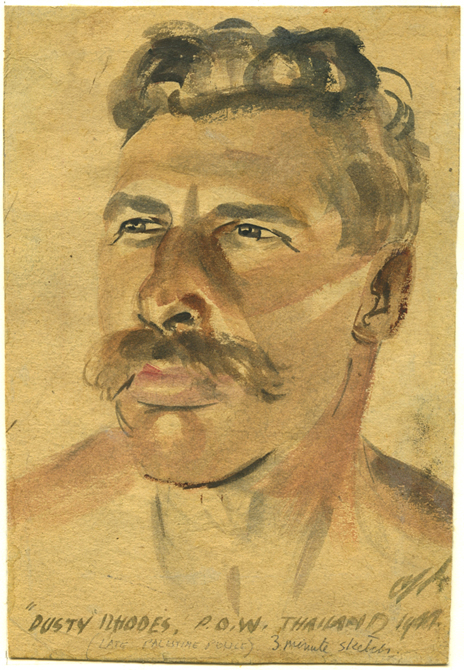
Portrait of FEPOW "Dusty" Rhodes. A three-minute sketch by Ashley George Old painted in Thailand in 1944.

== Compensation scheme ==
Since 2000, following a campaign led by the Royal British Legion, former Far East POWs are eligible for UK Government compensation for their suffering in POW and internment camps operated by the Japanese during the War.

Compensation may be payable to any member of all British Groups imprisoned by the Japanese in the Second World War. It is therefore available to British civilians and merchant seamen as well as members of British and Commonwealth forces. An amendment of the scheme in 2002 extended compensation to former Gurkha soldiers.

An application may be made by either a former POW or their family or estate. A successful FEPOW applicant is entitled to an ex gratia payment of £10,000. The scheme is currently administered by the Veterans Agency.

== Clubs and organisations ==
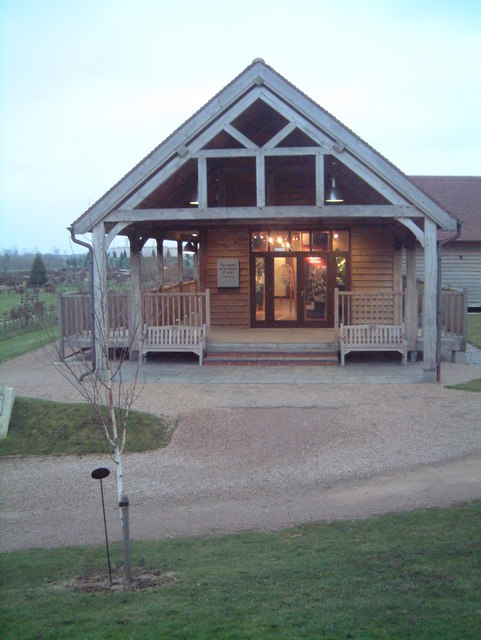
The Far East Prisoners of War Memorial Building, National Memorial Arboretum

The National Federation of Far East Prisoner of War Clubs and Associations (NFFCA) acts as an umbrella organisation for over 60 autonomous FEPOW Clubs and Associations in the UK.

The FEPOW Community has been set up to research loved ones who suffered under Japanese captivity during World War II. It does incorporate a free group, with its members helping each other in research. The Roll-of-Honour (Roll of Honour) has every death of service personnel and civilians mentioned in the site, most having a page of their own. The Far Eastern Heroes (Far Eastern Heroes) covers stories from the FEPOWs themselves, with a special page which promotes FEPOW Day as 15 August, the day Japan surrendered.

Children and Families of the Far East Prisoners of War (COFEPOW) was founded in 1997 by Carol Cooper in Norfolk after a chance reading of a newspaper article about the discovery of a diary of a soldier who had died working on the Burma Railway. It emerged that the soldier was her father. In 1999 it became a registered charity. Today it comprises a membership of children and siblings of those who died as POWs and campaigns to raise awareness, raises funds for the creation of memorials both in the UK and the Far East, and offers resources for research.

In 2005, it established the Far East Prisoners of War Memorial Building at the National Memorial Arboretum in Staffordshire, England. Within the building an exhibition tells the story of those captured by the Japanese during the Second World War. In the same area of the Arboretum are memorials for those prisoners of war who suffered and died building the Burma and Sumatra Railways.

See Inside and explore the Museum here

== FEPOW War Artists ==
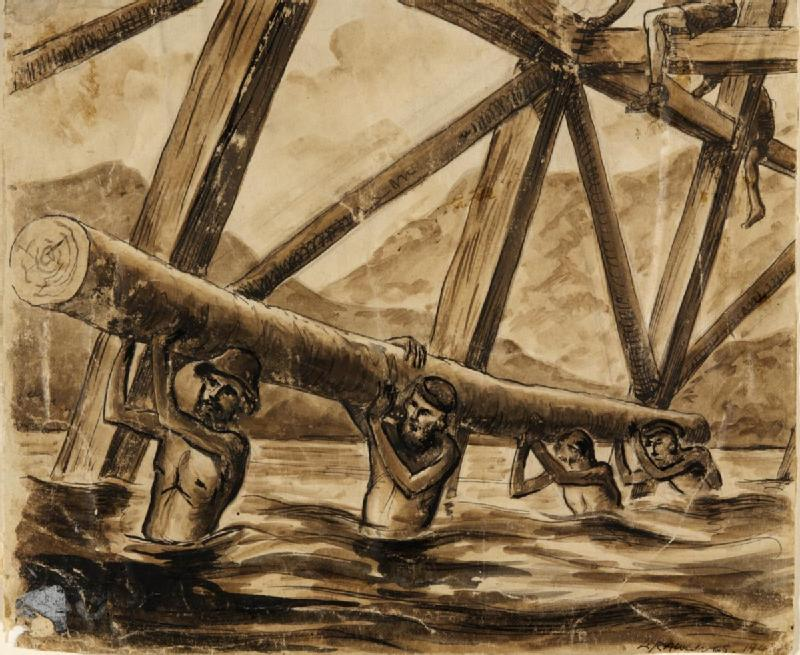
Bridge over the River Kwai by Leo Rawlings; four prisoners-of-war carry a large log across the River Kwai, waist deep in water

Life in the POW camps was recorded at great risk to themselves by artists such as Jack Bridger Chalker, Philip Meninsky, Ashley George Old and Ronald Searle. Human hair was often used for brushes, plant juices and blood for paint, and toilet paper as the "canvas". Some of their works were used as evidence in the trials of Japanese war criminals.

The Liverpool School of Tropical Medicine undertook a study of British Far East POW medical art subsequent to a FEPOW oral history.

An exhibition 'Secret Art of Survival - Creativity and ingenuity of British Far East prisoners of war, 1942 - 1945' was held at Victoria Gallery and Museum, University of Liverpool from 25 October 2019 - 20 June 2020.

== FEPOW Memorial Church ==
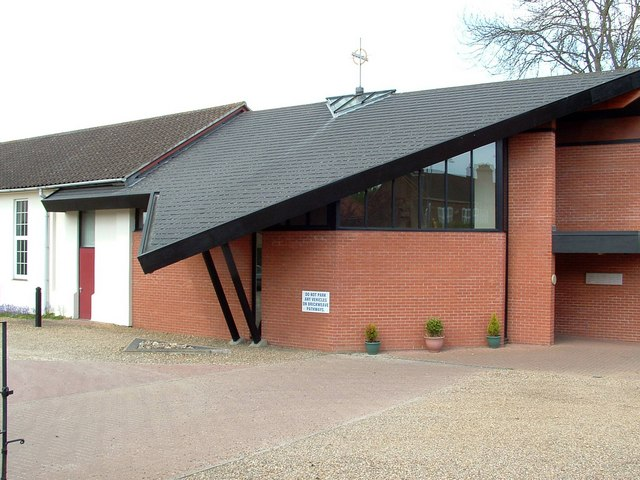
Wymondham Catholic Church and FEPOW memorial

Our Lady & St Thomas of Canterbury in Wymondham, Norfolk, England was completed in 1952 on the initiative of Father Malcolm Cowin - former Roman Catholic Chaplain to the 2nd Cambridgeshire Regiment and who himself had spent 3½ years in Japanese POW camps. The site and a fund to build the church had been provided by Irish labourers and USAAF personnel in the area. While a prisoner he helped construct three chapels in different camps and determined that on his return to the UK he would build a church in memory of those who died in Japanese POW and internment camps.

It serves as a parish church for the local Roman Catholic community as well as a focal point for the wider FEPOW community. There is a FEPOW shrine and an annual FEPOW memorial service held on the nearest Sunday to 14 May, the anniversary of the relief of Rangoon.

== Wisbech FEPOW Memorial ==
St Peter and St Paul's Church, Wisbech contains a FEPOW memorial dedicated to those who lost their lives in the Far East. Designed by Brian Krill the memorial is in the style of a bamboo prisoner of war hut. An exhibition to commemorate the 80th anniversary of the Singapore campaign was held February to April 2022 in the nearby Wisbech & Fenland Museum.

== See also ==
- Allied prisoners of war of Japan
- Burma Railway
- Changi Chapel and Museum
- Hell ship
- King Rat (1962 novel)
- Kra Isthmus Railway
- Sumatra Railway
- Civil Resettlement Units
