= Ashley George Old =

British artist

- Born: 1913; Bedford, Bedfordshire, England
- Died: 2001 (aged 87–88); Canvey Island, England
- Known for: Painting
- Notable work: The Major Arthur Moon Collection

Ashley George Old (1913–2001) was an artist best known for documenting the lives of prisoners of war forced to construct the Thailand-Burma Railway.

During World War II he was stationed in Singapore, and when it fell to the Japanese in February 1942, he was taken prisoner and sent to work on the aforementioned Death Railway.

== Training and early career ==
Old trained at Northampton College of Art, where he was taught anatomy by Lewis Duckett MC, a World War I ambulanceman. Subsequently he worked for the famous commercial art firm Carlton Artists. He later took further training at the Camberwell School of Art.

== World War II drawings and paintings ==
The brutal POW camp conditions and medical treatments in River Valley Road Camp, Changi Prison and Tamuan were extensively documented by Old in a series of drawings and paintings.

=== Major Arthur Moon Collection ===
Major Arthur Moon Collection Exhibition Catalogue Cover

Many of Old's works were buried in the ground and retrieved after the war. They eventually found their way to the State Library of Victoria in Australia where they form part of the Major Arthur Moon collection and can be viewed using the link below.

Often the works are of horrific subject material but contain a haunting beauty. The Major Arthur Moon collection catalogue cover shows a painting of a beckoning hand titled 'Bomb wound (air attack)' and is compared in the narrative to Picasso's Guernica as a truly extraordinary image of war, although Old's realistic images versus Picasso's more abstract modern image are of very different types.

Some paintings, such as the birthday card for Major Moon (also showing Edward Dunlop), even manage to find humour in adversity.

=== Burma Railway Medicine Book ===
This publication is the result of the long post-war collaboration between the Liverpool School of Tropical Medicine (LSTM) and British ex-Far East POWs. It features several examples of Old's work.

=== Wartime portraits ===
A painting by Old of Stanley Gimson, later to become Sheriff Principal of Grampian Highland and Islands, is held at the Imperial War Museum. Gimson's diary, also held by the museum, records the details of the sitting. The entry, while admiring, betrays the class attitudes of the time:

Had my portrait painted again, this time by a Northampton man named Old. He is a great hulking, fair-headed yokel with a face like a harvest moon – faintly reminiscent of Holbein’s Henry VIII. As he works he keeps up a continuous monologue – “That’s excellent – interesting position that – now will get the eyes”. His work is splendid though doesn’t seem to be in keeping with his character. The watercolour he did today is a fine piece of work, but is too much glamorised. I wish I could send it home – it would dispense of all fear.

The extraordinary speed with which Old could work, even under the most difficult conditions, is clearly shown by the portrait of "Dusty" Rhodes, which Old records as having been done in three minutes.

The portrait of Ernest Warwick is another example of the 1000 or so portraits Old is reported to have painted, although only 18 are known to have survived.

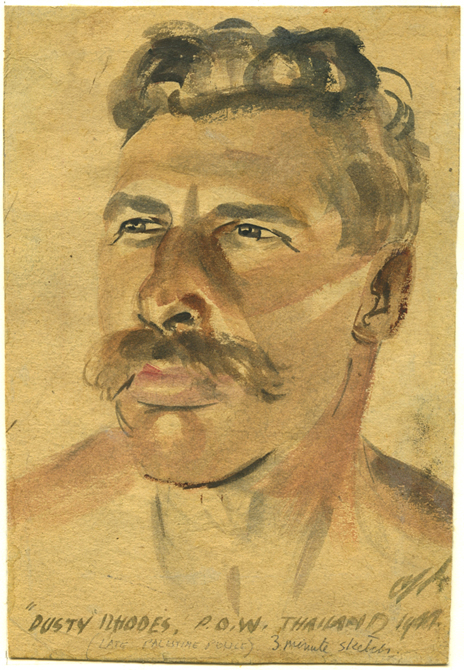
Portrait of POW "Dusty" Rhodes. A three-minute sketch by Old painted in Thailand in 1944

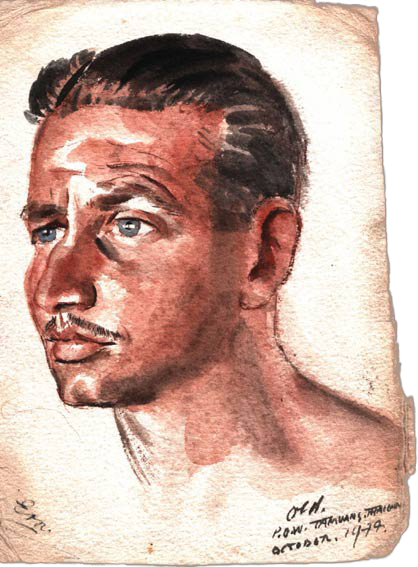
Portrait of Ernest Warwick by Ashley George Old

=== Contemporaries ===
Old was a contemporary of fellow FEPOW artists Jack Bridger Chalker, Philip Meninsky and Ronald Searle, all of whom risked their lives on a daily basis to make these historic records.

Old and Meninsky were reunited in 1995 after 50 years as guests of the Imperial War Museum for an exhibition Victory in the Far East – held 15 August to 15 December 1995.

== Later works ==
Until his death in 2001 the artist remained both deeply traumatised and enchanted by his experiences in the jungle while a POW. These conflicting emotions are evident in many of his later works; both horror and beauty are shown in the woodlands scenes below. These were painted at Cupid's Green, near Hemel Hempstead, in 1959. The artist spent many months there observing and recording the area's change from an old market town to one of the post-war 'New Towns'.

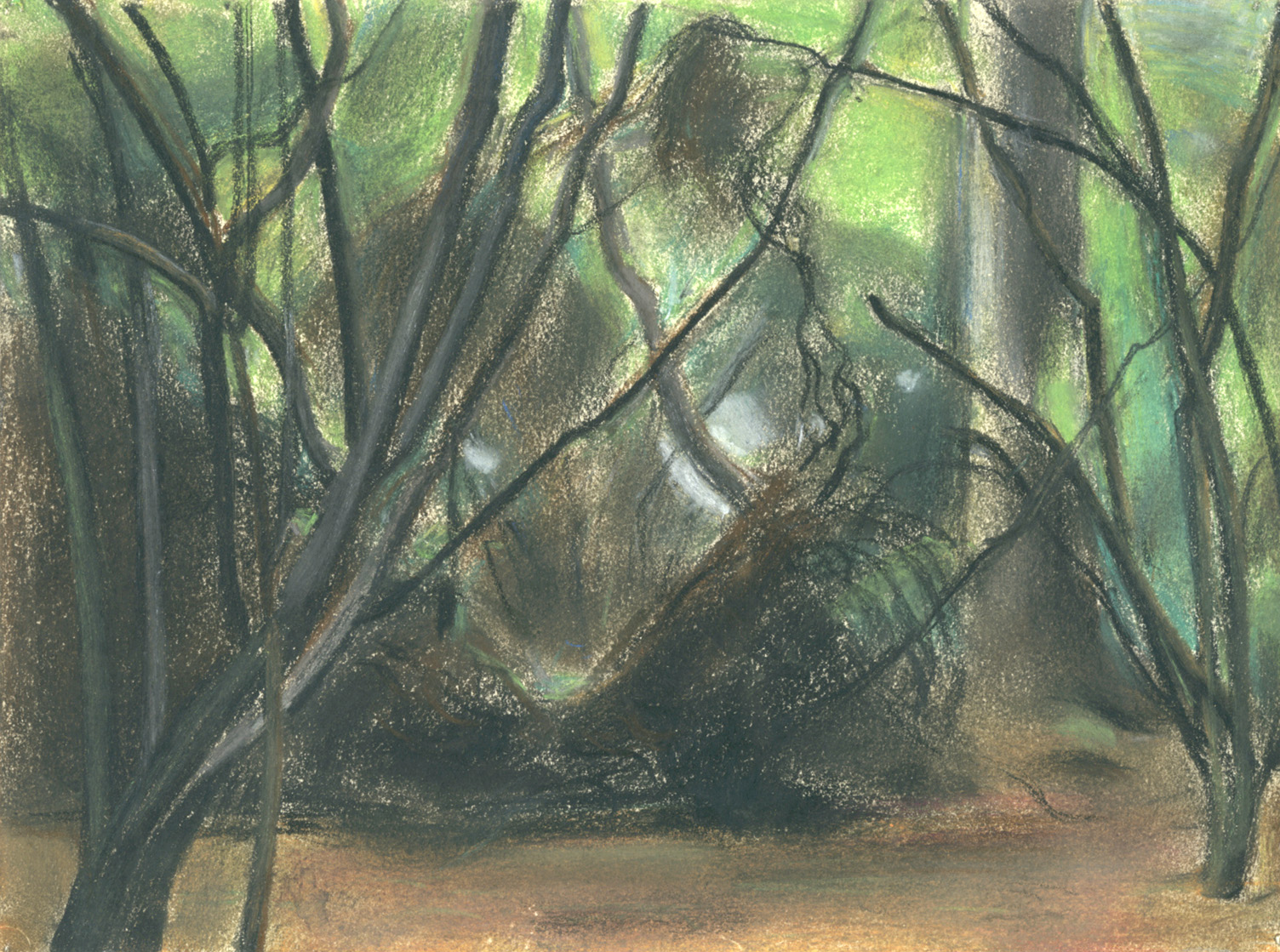
A dark view of the woods at Cupid's Green

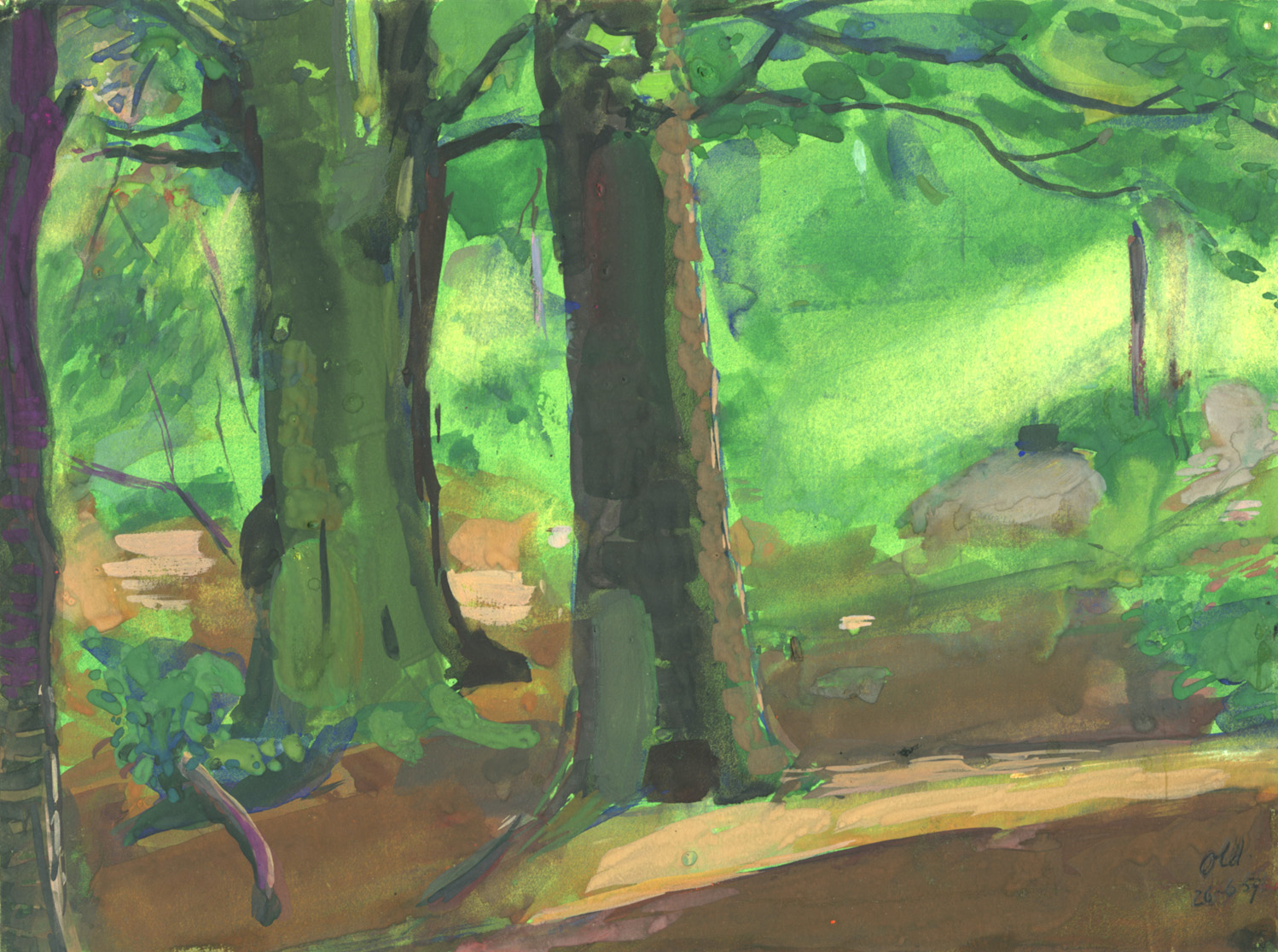
The woods at Cupid's Green transformed into a jungle
