= Can Tho prisoner of war camp =

South Vietnamese military prison and POW camp during Vietnam war

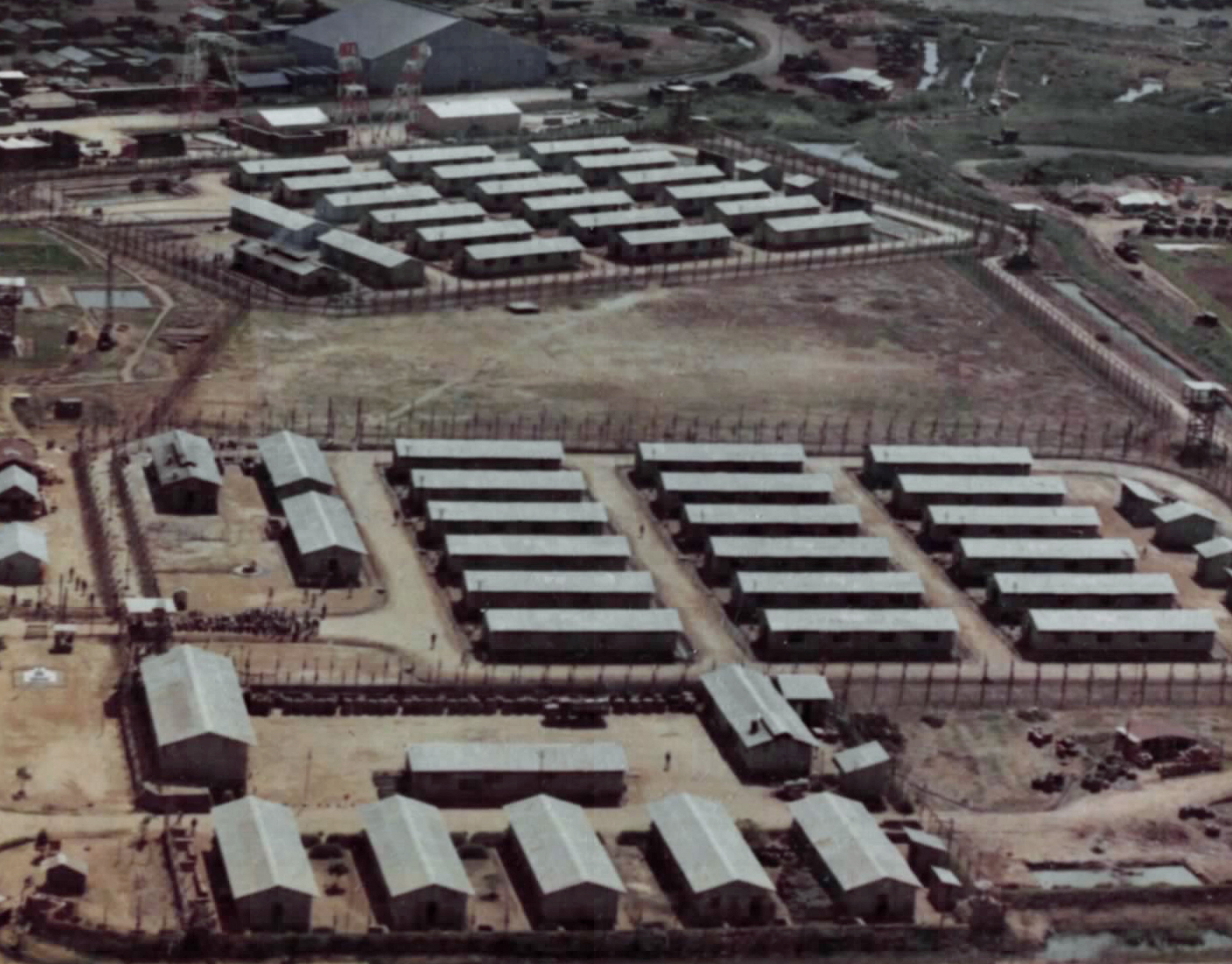
- Can Tho POW camp in November 1968

Site information
- Controlled by: Army of the Republic of Vietnam
- Condition: abandoned

Location
- Coordinates: 10.052°N 105.762°E

Site history
- In use: 1967–1975

Garrison information
- Past commanders: Deo-Ngoc Thanh; Hoang Dinh Hoat

Can Tho prisoner of war camp was a military prison in Cần Thơ, South Vietnam.

== History ==
On 27 November 1965 the United States and South Vietnamese Joint Military Committee proposed a workable plan for application of the Geneva Convention on Prisoners of War by the U.S., South Vietnamese and Free World forces. The plan called for the construction of five prisoner of war camps, one in each Corps Tactical Zone and one in the Capital Military District (Saigon), each having an initial capacity of 1,000 prisoners. Each camp would be staffed by South Vietnamese military police with U.S. military police prisoner of war advisers also assigned to each camp. The plan was approved in December 1965. Late in 1966 work was begun on the Can Tho camp in IV Corps.

In October 1971 the camp held 3,007 prisoners including 66 People's Army of Vietnam soldiers. Prisoners were allowed weekly visits by family members. The camp commander stated that 62 prisoners had died since the camp opened in 1967, most from injuries sustained during capture, while 310 prisoners had become Chieu Hoi.
