= Bernard Meninsky =

British painter (1891–1950)

- Бернард Менінський
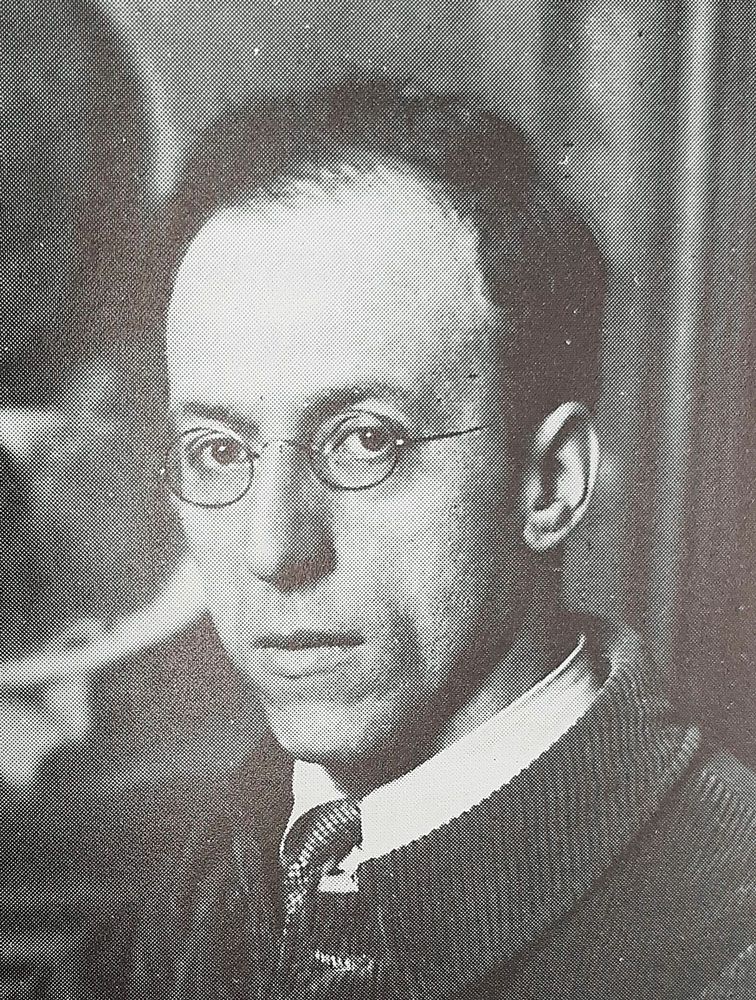
- Meninsky in 1926
- Born: Бернард Менушкін; Bernard Menushkin; 28 July 1891; Konotop, Chernigov Governorate, Russian Empire (now Ukraine)
- Died: 12 February 1950 (aged 58); London, UK
- Cause of death: Suicide
- Education: Liverpool School of Art, 1911; Académie Julian, 1911; Slade School of Fine Art, 1913
- Occupations: Painter; Drafter; Teacher
- Spouse(s): Margaret Meninsky (m. 1918, separated) Nora Barczinsky Meninsky (m. 1927)
- Children: 2, including Philip Meninsky

Bernard Meninsky (né Menushkin; Ukrainian: Бернард Менінський;(Ukrainian: Бернард Менушкін) 25 July 1891 – 12 February 1950) was a British painter of figures and landscapes in oils, watercolour and gouache, a drafter and a teacher.

== Biography ==
=== Early life and education ===
Bernard Meninsky was born on 25 July 1891 in Konotop, present-day Ukraine to a Yiddish-speaking Jewish Ukrainian family. The family moved to Liverpool when Bernard was six weeks old.

Although Meninsky left school at the age of eleven, his talent for art was demonstrated by the sale of a drawing to a local comic postcard business. While working as an errand boy during the day, he attended free art classes in the evenings, and these enabled him to gain a place at the Liverpool School of Art. He studied there from 1906 to 1911, being financed by a succession of scholarships. He attended summer courses at the Royal College of Art, London, in August 1909 and August 1910. In 1911 he won a scholarship to study at the Académie Julian in Paris for three months.

=== The Slade School and after ===
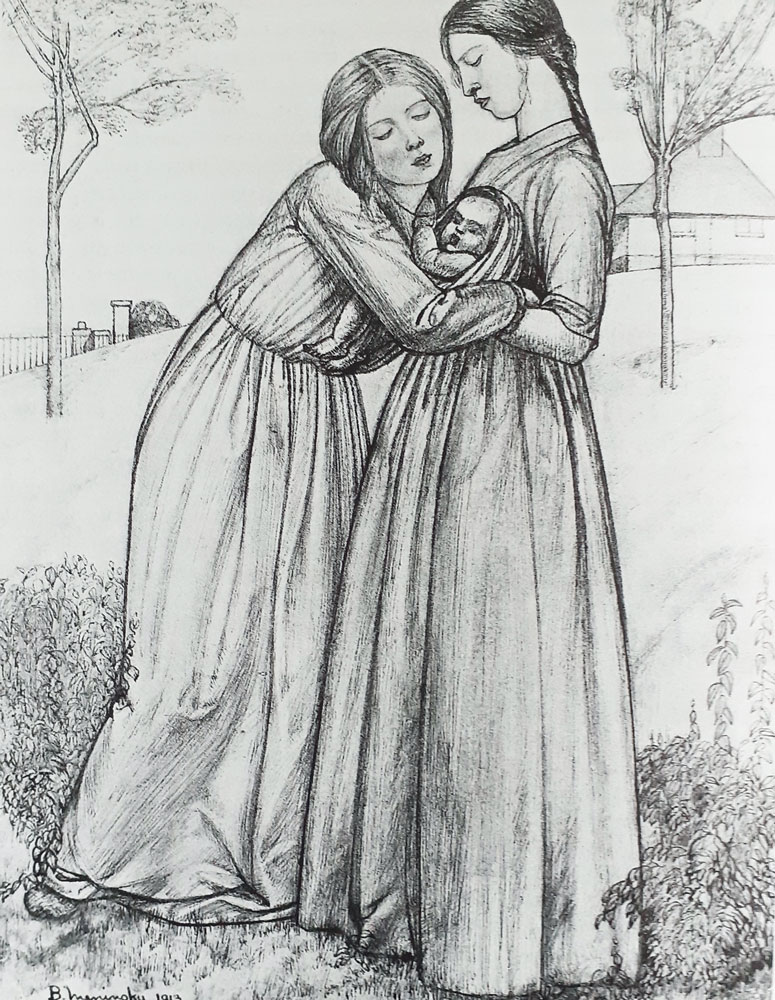
Black-and-white reproduction of Two Women and a Child, 1913

With financial support from the Liverpool Jewish community and the Jewish Educational Aid Society (JEAS), Meninsky studied at the Slade School of Fine Art in London in 1912. His contemporaries there included David Bomberg, Isaac Rosenberg, Jacob Kramer and William Roberts. Roberts would become a lifelong friend and later a colleague at the Central School of Arts and Crafts. Another important contact Meninsky made at this time was Walter Sickert, who hosted 'at homes' for Slade and ex-Slade students in his Fitzroy Street studio.

In the autumn of 1912 Roger Fry's Second Post-Impressionist Exhibition opened at the Grafton Galleries, London, and was seen by the public as scandalous in its modernism. Meninsky's tutors at the Slade, Henry Tonks and Wilson Steer, also rejected the cubist work on display at the Grafton. While Bomberg and Roberts would go on to explore their own brand of 'English Cubism' in their immediate post-Slade years, Meninsky's work was less radical – though he had nevertheless 'been bowled over most completely by the greatness of Cézanne'.

In 1913 Meninsky left the Slade to work as a 'pupil/teacher' for Edward Gordon Craig at his theatre school in Florence. Unfortunately he found Craig 'an unexpectedly hard and unreasonable task-master'. Returning to London a few months later, he began teaching life drawing at the Central School of Arts and Crafts. The principal of the Central, F. V. Burridge, had been head of the Liverpool School of Art when Meninsky had been a prize-winning student there. Teaching would be a passion of Meninsky's, and his relationship with the Central School would be important to him throughout his life.

=== World War I ===
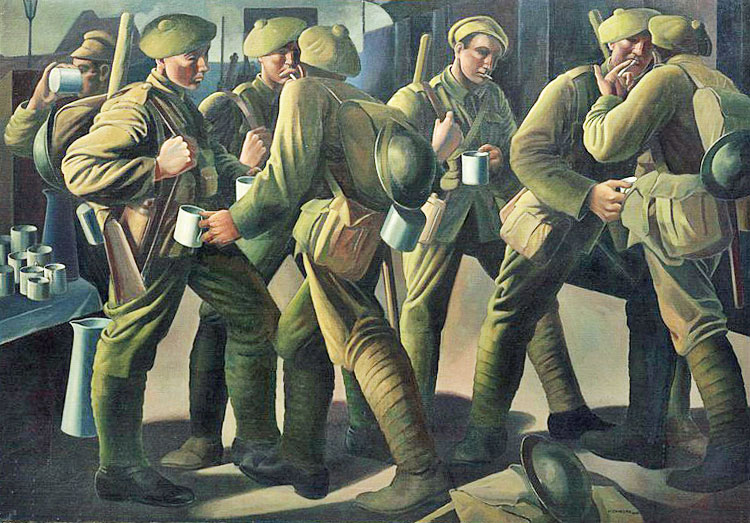
The Arrival of a Leave Train, Victoria Station, 1918

In the summer of 1914 Meninsky's work was exhibited in the 'Jewish Section' of 'Twentieth-Century Art: A Review of Modern Movements' at the Whitechapel Art Gallery in London's East End. During World War I Meninsky exhibited with the New English Art Club, the Friday Club and, from November 1916, with the London Group – an organisation that he would be associated with throughout his career.

In the first quarter of 1918 he married Margaret ('Peggy') O'Connor in Marylebone Register Office, and their son David was born later that year.

Meninsky had enlisted as a private in the Royal Fusiliers in January 1918, and worked in a clerical capacity in the regiment. He applied to be a war artist under the scheme run by the British War Memorials Committee (BWMC), and was released from military duties for an initial four-month period from May 1918. He was discharged from military service in August 1918, due to neurasthenia. Meninsky completed The Arrival of a Leave Train, Victoria Station, 1918 and at least five other related works before the end of 1918, all of which are now in the Imperial War Museum collection. The Arrival of a Leave Train, Victoria Station, 1918 was included in the major exhibition of war art held at the National Gallery, London, in late 1919 and early 1920.

=== Mother and Child ===
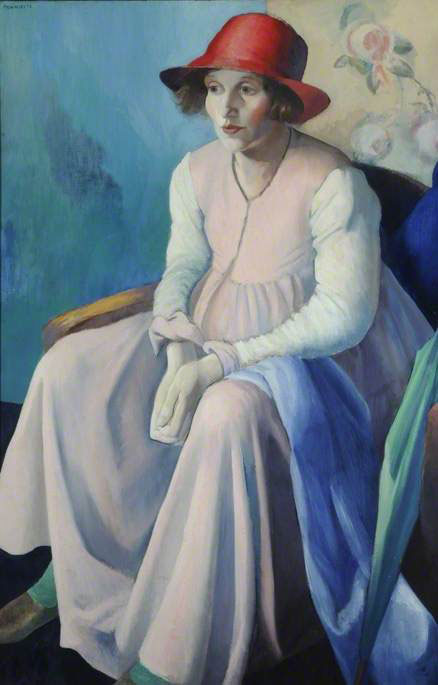
The Red Hat – a portrait of Margaret Meninsky when she was pregnant with their second child, 1919

After the war ended, Meninsky resumed teaching at the Central School and also accepted Walter Sickert's invitation to take over his life class at the Westminster School of Art. When it came to light that Meninsky was still on the BWMC contract, he was required to extend his involvement with the war artist scheme for a further period.

In the first few months of his son's life, Meninsky created a portfolio of 28 'mother and child' drawings in a variety of media, and the subject became a regular theme throughout Meninsky's career. When he was elected to the London Group in 1919, he exhibited an oil painting on this subject at their April 1919 exhibition, and an exhibition of 'Maternity and Other Figure Subjects by Bernard Meninsky' was held at the Goupil Gallery, Regent Street, London, in May 1919, leading to the publication of Mother and Child: Twenty-Eight Drawings by Bernard Meninsky by the publisher John Lane in the following year.

=== The end of a marriage ===
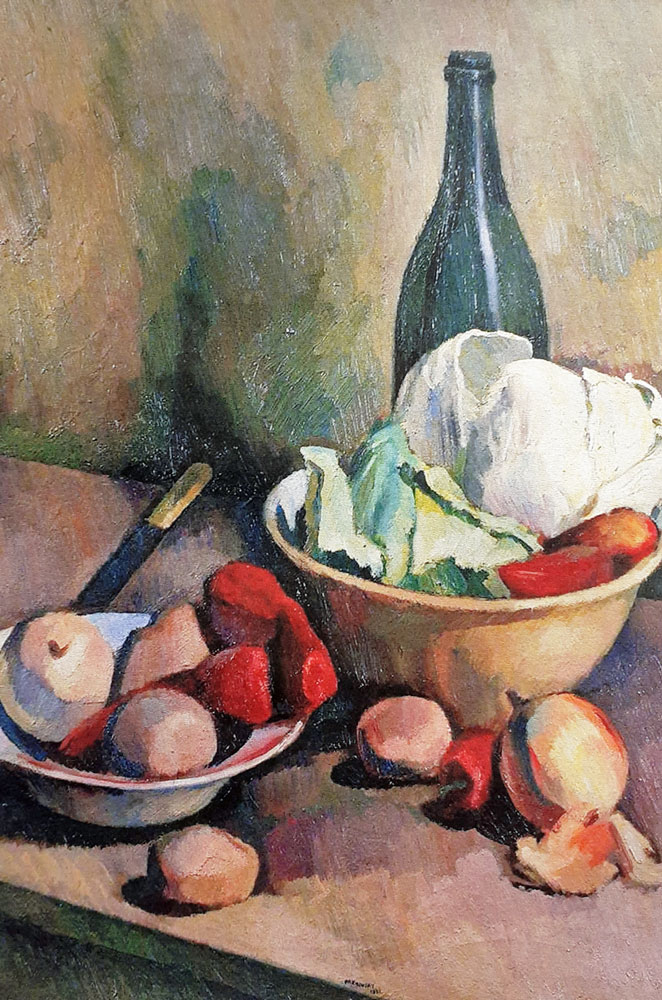
Still Life, 1921

In the spring of 1919 Meninsky's wife was pregnant again, and their second son, Philip, was born in November 1919. When Philip was barely six months old, Margaret Meninsky walked out on her husband and children. Meninsky acted swiftly to foster his children. David was placed with Meninsky's sister Katie in Liverpool, and Philip was placed with a retired nanny in Hertfordshire. Philip's placement was initially a six-month arrangement, but it lasted for the first 18 years of his life.

In the winter of 1922 Meninsky tried to put his personal troubles behind him by means of an extended caravan trip to the south of France with a friend, Stuart Edmonds. The stimulus of the Mediterranean light encouraged him to work more on landscape painting. Upon returning to London Meninsky immersed himself in his teaching and took an active organisational role in the London Group, which was now headed by Roger Fry. The 'Bloomsbury artists' Vanessa Bell, Duncan Grant and Fry dominated the London Group shows of the 1920s, and to some extent Meninsky's work shares their 'English Post-Impressionist' aesthetic. Throughout the 1920s Meninsky worked in the familiar genres – still life, landscape, the nude – avoiding narrative and focusing on form.

=== A new start ===
Meninsky visited his son Philip from time to time, sometimes with a female companion. He saw David, in Liverpool, less frequently. Meninsky's biographer John Russell Taylor writes that 'as a man and so as a teacher, Meninsky was moody and unpredictable. Often he could be jovial and enthusiastic, but sometimes he could be cruelly dismimissive.' In 1923 Meninsky was elected to the New English Art Club, and he exhibited regularly with them as well as with the London Group. Although his ex-student and latterly friend Morris Kestelman described his 'pervasive melancholy', Meninsky could also 'shine in company' and was a 'brilliant conversationalist', holding his own with intellectual friends such as Helen Darbishire and Emanuel Miller.

In the mid-1920s Meninsky arranged for his friend William Roberts to share his life class duties at the Central School, and in this capacity they worked together for the next 25 years. Meninsky's financial circumstances were similar to those of the Robertses. Referring back to these times, William Roberts's wife, Sarah (née Kramer), described the realities of being an artist's wife, 'living in poverty, from hand to mouth … Living in a room or rooms, sharing a lavatory, with a sink maybe on a landing … "People today can't imagine just how poor we were in those days."'

The burden placed on artists such as Meninsky struggling to support children was immense. It was difficult to sell work in the post-war economic recession. Meninsky had pledged to repay his Slade loan from the JEAS, which now amounted to £80. He was, however, not in a position to do so, and his offer of paintings and drawings in compensation was rejected. The debt remained unpaid at his death.

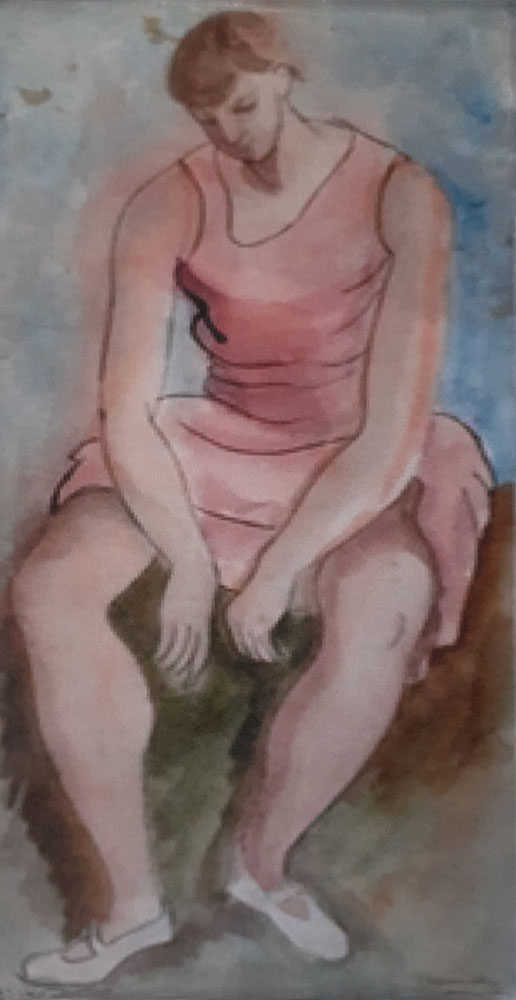
Ballerina, pencil, ink and watercolour, 1928

Nevertheless, Meninsky's exhibiting career was on the up, and in 1926 he had two solo shows in London: of drawings at the Mayor Gallery and of watercolours at the Lefevre Gallery. It was also in this year that he met a young dancer, Nora Barczinsky (stage name Nora Edwards), who was then in the chorus of the successful operetta Rose-Marie in London's West End. As evidenced by poems and love letters, the couple's 18-month courtship was passionate and romantic.

In 1927 Meninsky had a large show of oil paintings, watercolours and drawings at the Collectors Gallery in Manchester. And in November of that year his first wife, now 'Margaret Rendall', died. By the end of the year, Nora and Bernard Meninsky were married – they surprised their friends by marrying in a synagogue – and they moved to a new flat in Abbey Road, St John's Wood. An exhibition of Meninsky's oil paintings at the St George's Gallery, London, in 1930 was well received.

=== Difficulties ===
That Meninsky and Nora were both 'strong-willed and sometimes stubborn' contributed to a situation in which the early years of their marriage were tempestuous. Meninsky's 'obsessive devotion' to his wife manifested itself in jealousies and accusations of infidelity. Meninsky was also suffering from an extreme form of hypochondria, thinking – falsely – that he had throat cancer. Later he felt that his eyesight was failing and that he would become blind. He was admitted to a private clinic for 'Functional Nervous Disorders' – but worried that he would be unable to keep up the payments. Later, at the Maudsley Hospital, he was treated with electro-shock treatment and classic Freudian psychoanalysis for 'agoraphobia, claustrophobia and general depression'. Meninsky responded well to the treatment, and by the mid-1930s he was able to return to teaching and had an exhibition of watercolours at Zwemmer's Gallery.

=== New opportunities and approaches ===
In 1935 an opportunity arose to design the sets and costume for a ballet, David, with the newly formed Markova–Dolin Company. Meninsky explained that 'the work of Picasso, Derain, and Matisse made me realise the unique opportunities which the theatre can give the painter to express himself on a vast scale in terms of colour or light and shade.' Meninsky's work of the 1930s and '40s is marked by a change of direction. Now his female figures take on a monumentality that owes something to Picasso's neoclassical style. For three of the winter months of 1935/6 Meninsky travelled to Torremolinos and Málaga in Spain, funded by a grant from the Artists' Benevolent Society.

Meninsky's finances became a little more secure in the pre-war 1930s. Edward Marsh – for many years Winston Churchill's secretary – bought some Meninsky drawings for himself and also on behalf of his friend Ivor Novello. Through Marsh, Meninsky met Churchill, who in the years following World War II would occasionally drop into Meninsky's studio for lessons. Another important patron in the late 1930s was Lord Glenconner, who greatly admired Meninsky's work. As well as befriending the Meninskys, he offered practical financial help by setting up a £100 a year allowance for Meninsky.

=== World War II and later ===
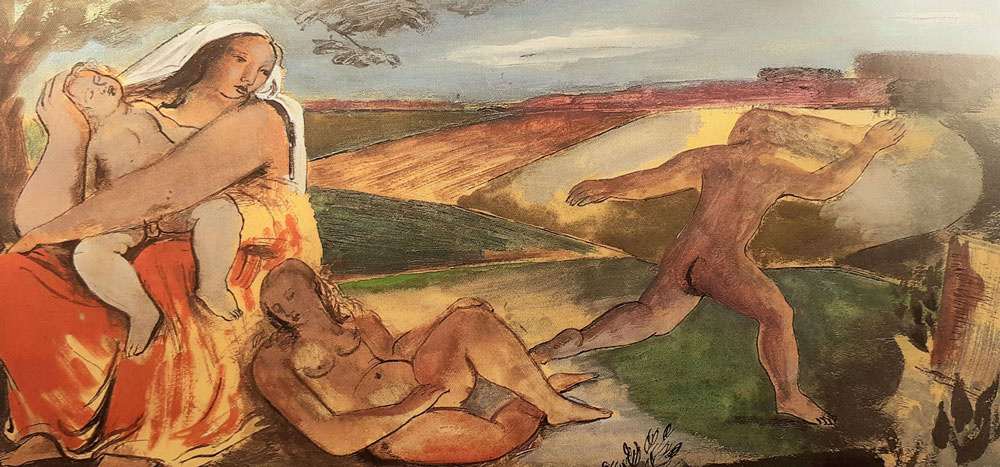
Flight, gouache, 1947

With the outbreak of war in September 1939 the London art schools closed and, following stays with Nora's relatives in the winter of 1939/40, the Meninskys moved to Oxford, where they had a small circle of friends including Helen Darbishire, the artist Paul Nash and his wife Margaret, and William and Sarah Roberts, who had decamped to Oxford at the beginning of the war. Meninsky secured work at the Oxford City School of Art for himself and Roberts. In August 1942 Meninsky was approached by the War Artists' Advisory Committee to paint a watercolour connected to home-front activity for a fee of 30 guineas, and he later negotiated a further portrait commission.

In 1945 Meninsky returned to London and to teaching at the Central School. His work moved into what can be seen as a final phase that drew upon the visionary dream worlds of William Blake and Samuel Palmer and the pastoral poems of John Milton, whose 'L'Allegro' and 'Il Penseroso' Meninsky was commissioned to illustrate by the publisher Alan Wingate. Taylor summarises the work of this period thus: 'Meninsky's rich-tone landscapes … were peopled with mothers and children, family groups travelling (several canvases … inspired by the New Testament story of the Flight into Egypt), pilgrims with staff in hand, shepherds without flocks and heavy-limbed women resting.'

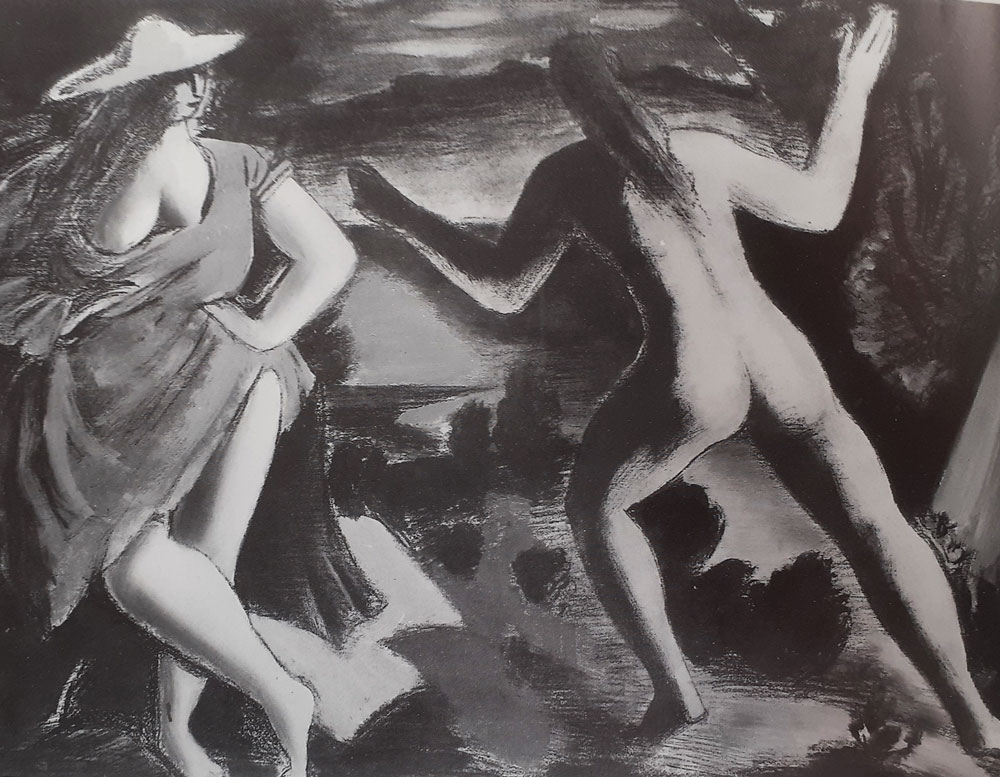
Figures in a Landscape, a lithograph with gouache, 1946

There was much to celebrate at the end of the war – Meninsky's son Philip had survived capture by the Japanese, being forced to work on the Burma–Thailand Railway and internment in POW camps in Malaya and Thailand, where, undetected, he made drawings of camp life. As he approached 60, Meninsky was seen as something of an elder statesman. He was commissioned by the Arts Council to curate an exhibition, 'The Art of Drawing', in 1948, and a profile article on him appeared in the first issue of Art News and Review. The magazine enthused, 'Using a palette which owes something to the Fauves, and through them to the Expressionists, he has created a world of classical dignity and plastic form.' However, despite these positive events, his mental health had deteriorated in the previous five years, and he died by suicide on 12 February 1950.

=== Legacy ===
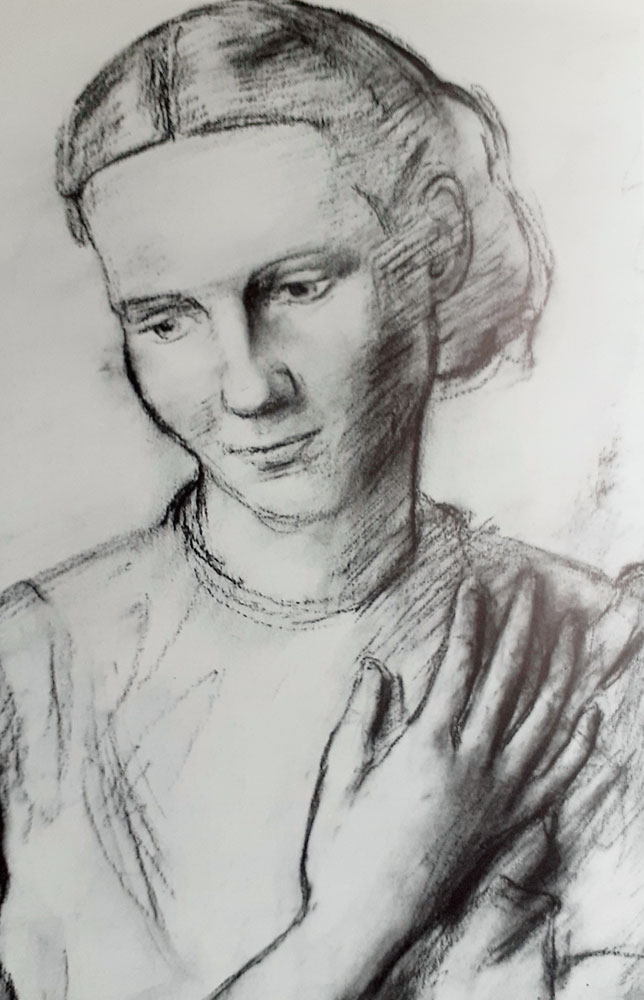
Portrait of Nora Meninsky, charcoal, 1944

A Meninsky memorial exhibition was organised by the Arts Council in 1951, and a number of retrospective shows have been staged since, by, among others, the Adams Gallery (1958); the Crestine Gallery, Edinburgh (1965); the Boydell Gallery, Liverpool (1966); the Tib Lane Gallery, Manchester (1972); the Belgrave Gallery, London (1976); the Annexe Gallery, Wimbledon (1977); Blond Fine Art, London (1978); Worthing Art Gallery (1979); the Museum of Modern Art, Oxford (1981). In addition the exhibition 'A Singular Vision: Drawings and Paintings by Bernard Meninsky' toured to Liverpool, Leeds, Sheffield, London and Kingston upon Thames in 2001. Nora Meninsky bequeathed her collection of her husband's work to the Contemporary Art Society to distribute to regional galleries in the UK and beyond. Seventy-five of his works are in UK public collections, including those of the Arts Council, the British Museum, the Imperial War Museum, the National Gallery of Ireland, the Tate Gallery, the Victoria and Albert Museum, and regional galleries including those in Hull, Leeds, Liverpool, Manchester, Nottingham and Sheffield. In 1990 a biography, Bernard Meninsky, by John Russell Taylor was published by Redcliffe Press, Bristol. Nora Meninsky bequeathed collections of photographs, letters, documents, sketchbooks, exhibition catalogues and writings to the Tate archive – some of which have been digitised. The Imperial War Museum holds letters relating to Meninsky's commissions as a war artist.
