= Jack Bridger Chalker =

British artist and teacher

- Born: 10 October 1918; London
- Died: 15 November 2014 (aged 96)
- Education: Goldsmiths College, Royal College of Art
- Known for: Painting, drawing, war artist

Jack Bridger Chalker (10 October 1918 – 15 November 2014), was a British artist and teacher best known for his work recording the lives of the prisoners of war building the Burma Railway during World War II.

== Biography ==
Chalker was born in London, the son of a railway stationmaster who had been awarded the MBE for his work in World War I. After attending Alleyn's School in Dulwich and training in graphics and painting at Goldsmiths College, Chalker won a scholarship to the Painting School of the Royal College of Art in London. However, Chalker was conscripted into the British Army before he could take up his scholarship.

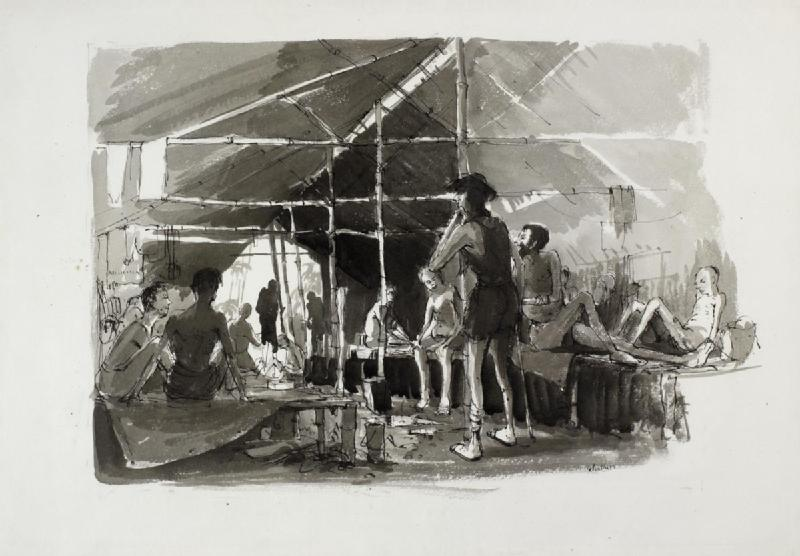
A Ward in the Chungkai Hospital (Art.IWM ARTLD 6652)

While serving in Singapore as a bombardier with the Royal Field Artillery in February 1942, Chalker was captured by the invading Japanese forces during the fall of Singapore. Chalker was held as a prisoner of war, first in Changi prison then two labour camps before being sent to work on the Burma Railway. On a part of the line in Kanchanaburi, Chalker used stolen paper and other materials to record the torture, malnutrition and illnesses endured by the prisoners. Although he risked being badly beaten, or worse, for doing so he managed to produce, and keep hidden, over one hundred paintings and drawings during his captivity between 1942 and 1945. He met the Australian surgeon Colonel Edward Dunlop in 1944 and agreed, again at great personal risk, to make detailed records of the prisoner's medical conditions to help Dunlop in his work. When released in 1945, Chalker spent some time at the Australian Army HQ in Bangkok working as an official war artist. Chalker's works, together with those of fellow POW artists Philip Meninsky, Ashley George Old and Ronald Searle form a unique record of prisoners' suffering during the building of the railway and were used in evidence at the subsequent Tokyo War Crimes Tribunal. Many of these paintings are now located at the Australian War Memorial and the Imperial War Museum. In 1995 an exhibition of the works of the four artists was held at the State Library of Victoria under the title 'The Major Arthur Moon Collection'.

Chalker returned to England at the end of 1945 and he graduated from the Royal College of Art in 1946. He was appointed Director of Art at the Cheltenham Ladies College and also worked as a visiting tutor at the Cheltenham College of Printing. In 1950 he became the Principal of Falmouth College of Art and after some years working as an advisor in local government Chalker took the same post at the West of England College of Art in Bristol in 1958. When that college became part of Bristol Polytechnic in 1969 Chalker became Head of the Faculty of Art and Design in the new institution and retained that post until he retired in 1974.

Chalker also worked as a medical illustrator, made anatomical models for a medical company and was elected a fellow of The Medical Artists' Association of Great Britain. He was awarded an honorary degree by the University of the West of England in 2003. Ill-health resulting from his wartime treatment led to Chalker selling many of his Burma sketches in 2002 in an auction that gained worldwide attention.

== Bibliography ==
- Burma Railway Artist. Leo Cooper, London, 1994. ISBN 0850523370
- Burma Railway: Images of War. Mercer Books, Shepton Mallet, 2007. ISBN 9780955712708
