= Weary Dunlop =

Australian military surgeon (1907–1993)

Colonel Sir Weary Dunlop AC, CMG, OBE
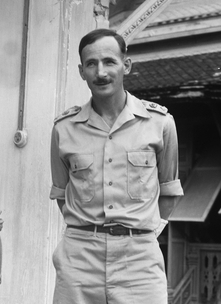
- Dunlop in Bangkok, 1945
- Born: Ernest Edward Dunlop; 12 July 1907; Wangaratta, Victoria, Australia
- Died: 2 July 1993 (aged 85); Melbourne, Victoria, Australia
- Military career
- Allegiance: Australia
- Branch: Australian Army
- Service years: 1935–1946
- Rank: Colonel
- Nickname: Weary
- Units: Royal Australian Army Medical Corps; 2/2nd Casualty Clearing Station
- Commands: No. 1 Allied General Hospital
- Conflicts: Second World War; Battle of Greece; North African Campaign; Syria-Lebanon campaign; South West Pacific; New Guinea Campaign; South East Asia Campaign
- Awards: Companion of the Order of Australia; Knight Bachelor; Companion of the Order of St Michael and St George; Officer of the Order of the British Empire; Knight of the Venerable Order of Saint John; Mentioned in Despatches

Colonel Sir Ernest Edward "Weary" Dunlop, AC, CMG, OBE (12 July 1907 – 2 July 1993) was an Australian surgeon who was renowned for his leadership while being held prisoner by the Japanese during the Second World War.

== Early life and family ==
Dunlop was born in Wangaratta, Victoria, the second of two children of parents James and Alice Dunlop. He was raised on a 580 acre mixed farm of sheep, cattle, and wheat. He attended Benalla High School for two years of his education. He started an apprenticeship in pharmacy when he finished school, and moved to Melbourne in 1927. There, he studied at the Victorian College of Pharmacy (VCP) which he had won a scholarship to. After finishing first class honours, Dunlop won another scholarship, this time to the University of Melbourne, with accommodation at the prestigious Ormond College. Dunlop graduated from the University of Melbourne in 1934 with first class honours in pharmacy and in medicine, and excelled as a sportsman at Melbourne University and Ormond College. The nickname "Weary" was a reference to his last name—"tired" like a Dunlop tyre.

== Rugby union career ==
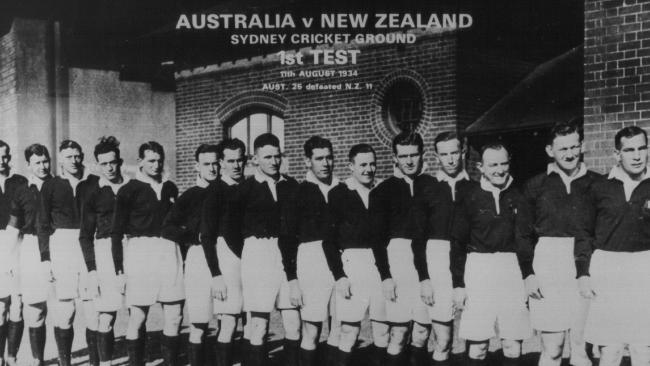
Dunlop with the victorious Bledisloe Wallabies, 1st Test v NZ 11 August 1934

Although brought up playing Australian Rules football, when at university – and although still playing "Aussie Rules", as a ruckman for Ormond College – Dunlop took up rugby union; commencing as a fourth grade player with the Melbourne University Rugby Club in 1931. He rapidly progressed through the grades, to state, and then to the national representative level, becoming the first Victorian-born player to represent the Wallabies. Dunlop reportedly stood at 6 ft 4 in (1.93 m), and weighed 15 st (95 kg).

He made his national representative debut against the All Blacks at the Sydney Cricket Ground on 23 July 1932 as a number 8.

In the first Test of 1934 he again appeared for Australia, this time as a lock Australia won the match 25–11. Dunlop had broken his nose in a head clash in the Melbourne University boxing championships on 3 August 1934, and it was broken again in the first five minutes of the match.

Two weeks later the second and final match of that year's Bledisloe Cup series finished in a draw; and, although Dunlop missed that match – he was one of a number of players from both teams who were victims of influenza – he stands as a member of the first Wallaby squad to have won the Bledisloe Cup away from New Zealand.

In June 2008, he was honoured in the third set of inductees into the Australian Rugby Union Hall of Fame. To date, he is the only Victorian so honoured.

== Pre-war career ==
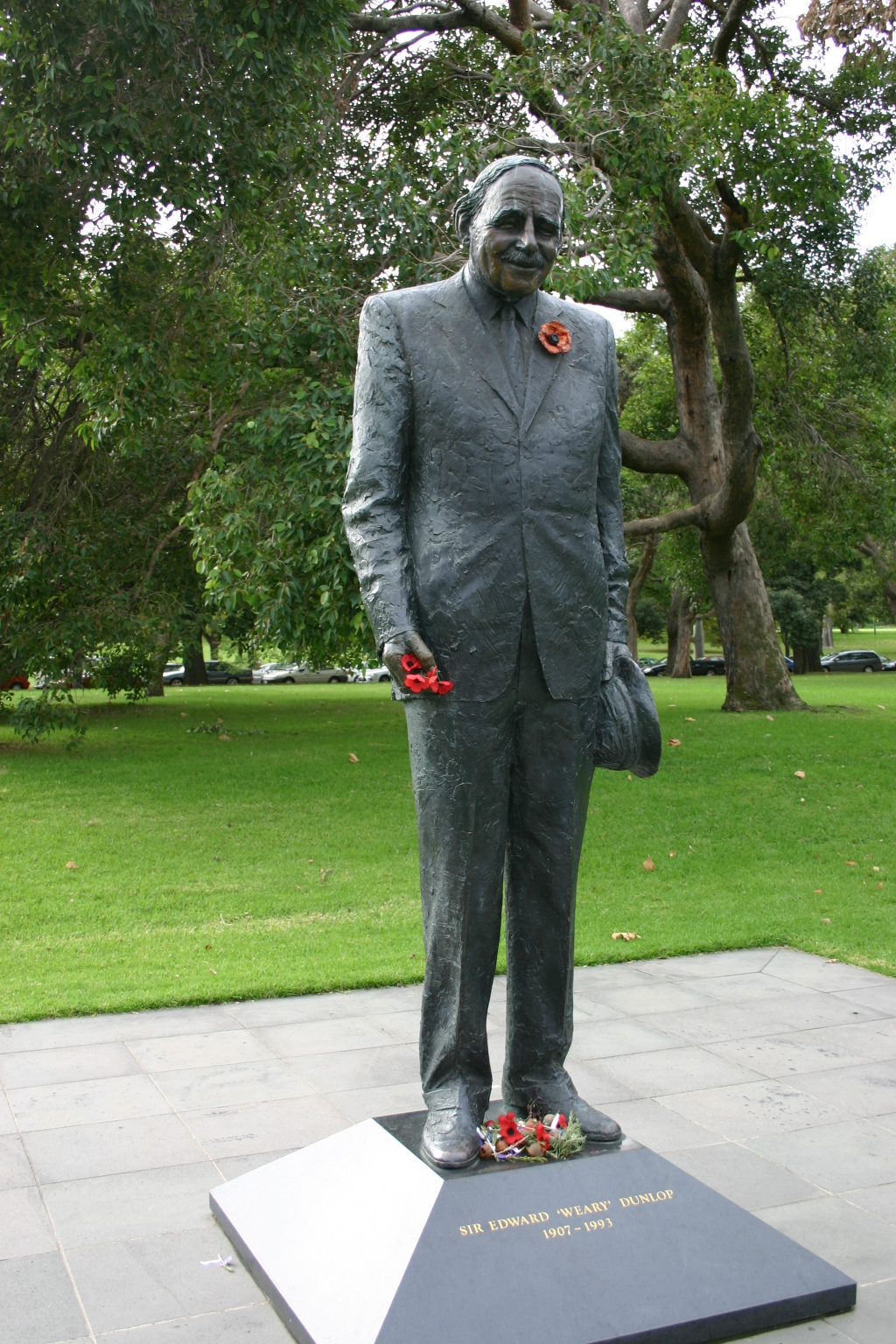
A bronze statue of Edward Dunlop situated in the Domain Parklands, Melbourne

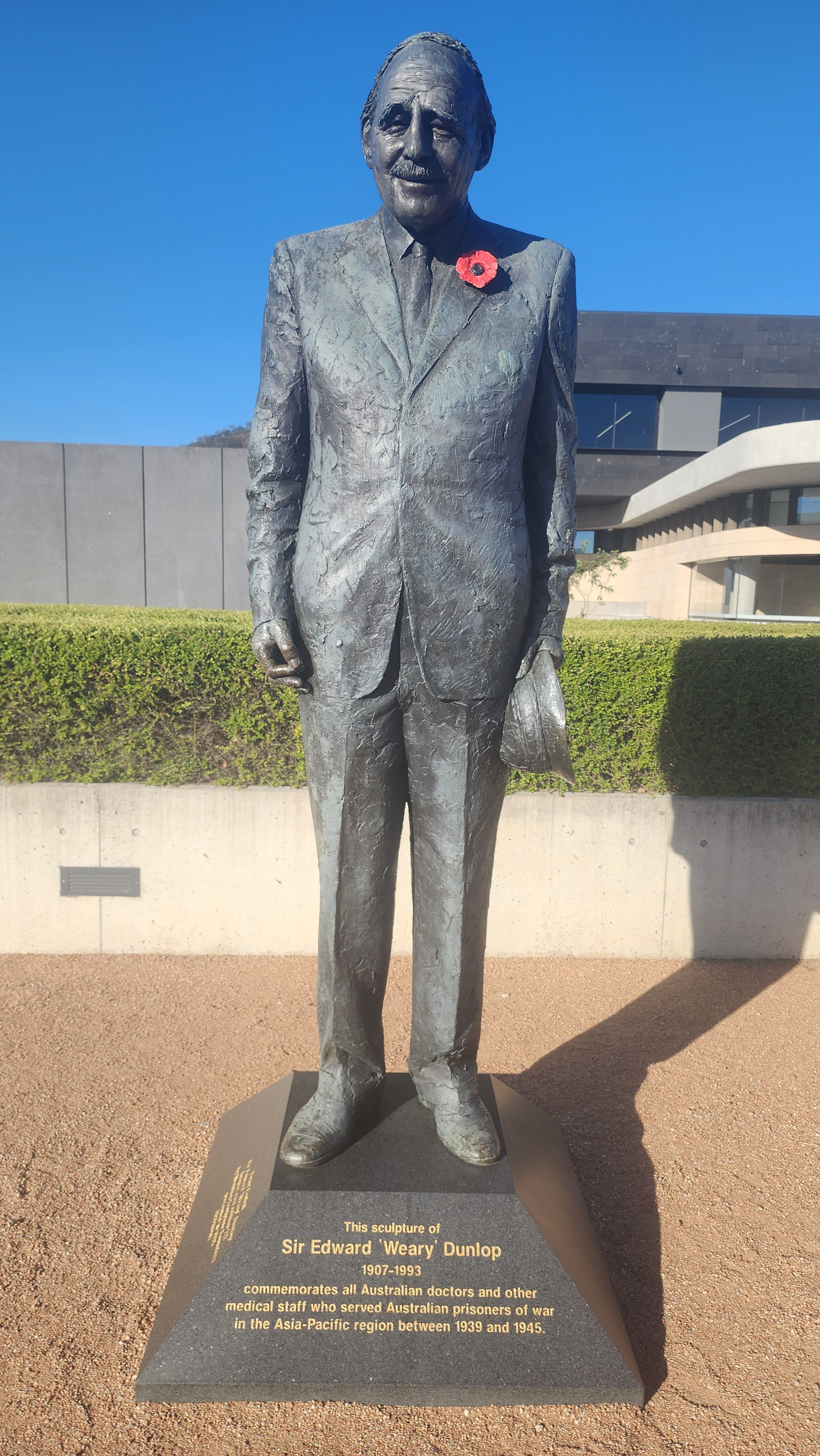
A bronze statue of Edward Dunlop at the Australian War Memorial, Canberra, 2nd of an edition of two by sculptor Peter Corlett, the other in the Domain Parklands in Melbourne. This statue "commemorates all Australian doctors and medical staff who served Australian prisoners of war in the Asia-Pacific region between 1939 and 1945." Conserved 1995, remounted 2010

Dunlop had been a school cadet, and he continued his part-time army service until 1929, when his service ceased under pressure from his pharmacy studies. He re-enlisted in 1935 and was commissioned into the Australian Army Medical Corps on 1 July with the rank of captain. In May 1938 Dunlop left Australia for London on a ship, where he served as her medical officer. In London he attended St Bartholomew's Medical School and in 1938 became a Fellow of the Royal College of Surgeons. The distinguished medical mentors Dunlop met in London, Professor Grey-Turner and Sir Thomas Dunhill, impressed him with their dedication to their job and he resolved to emulate their example.

== War and imprisonment ==
During the Second World War, Dunlop was appointed to medical headquarters in the Middle East, where he developed the mobile surgical unit. In Greece he liaised with forward medical units and Allied headquarters, and at Tobruk he was a surgeon until the Australian Divisions were withdrawn for home defence. His troopship was diverted to Java in an ill-planned attempt to bolster the defences there. On 26 February 1942, he was promoted to temporary lieutenant-colonel. Dunlop became a Japanese prisoner of war in 1942 when he was captured in Bandung, Java, together with the hospital he was commanding.

Because of his leadership skills, he was placed in charge of prisoner-of-war camps in Java, and was later transferred briefly to Changi, and in January 1943 commanded the first Australians sent to work on the Thai segment of the Burma-Thailand railway where prisoners of the Japanese were being used as forced labourers to construct a strategically important supply route between Bangkok and Rangoon. Conditions in the railway camps were primitive and horrific—food was totally inadequate, beatings were frequent and severe, there were no medical supplies, tropical diseases were rampant, and the Japanese required a level of productivity that would have been difficult for fully fit and properly equipped men to achieve.

Along with a number of other Commonwealth Medical Officers, Dunlop was credited with restoring morale in the prison camps and jungle hospitals, and his work has been cited as one of the reasons Australian survival rates were among the highest.

He became, in the words of one of his men, the author Donald Stuart, "a lighthouse of sanity in a universe of madness and suffering".

He is depicted in a lighter moment during these terrible times on a birthday card painted by Ashley George Old for Major Arthur Moon and now held at the State Library of Victoria (SLV).

== Post-war life and death ==
Dunlop was a Protestant Christian, and a Freemason. In 1989, Dunlop published The War Diaries of Weary Dunlop: Java and the Burma–Thailand Railway, 1942–1945, a volume compiling many of his wartime diaries from the Pacific War, through Lennard Publishing.

Dunlop died in Melbourne in 1993. He had a state funeral held at St Paul's Cathedral, Melbourne which was attended by more than 20,000 people. Some of his ashes were scattered at Hellfire Pass in Thailand.

== Honours and awards ==
'Weary' Dunlop received many honours and awards throughout his life, including:

- Officer of the Order of the British Empire (1947)
- Companion of the Order of St Michael and St George (1965)
- Knight Bachelor (1969)
- named Australian of the Year 1976
- Companion of the Order of Australia (1987)
- Knight Commander of the Order of St John of Jerusalem (Knights Hospitaller) (1992)
- Knight Grand Cross (1st Class) of the Order of the Crown of Thailand (1993)
- Fellow of the Royal College of Surgeons of England
- Fellow of the Royal Australasian College of Surgeons
- Honorary Fellow of the Imperial College London
- Honorary Fellow of the Royal College of Surgeons of Edinburgh
- Honorary Life Member of the Returned and Services League of Australia
- Life Governor of the Royal Women's Hospital and the Royal Victorian Eye and Ear Hospital.

In 1988 Dunlop was named one of '200 Great Australians'. In June 2008, he was honoured in the third set of inductees into the Australian Rugby Union Hall of Fame.

He received the posthumous honour of having the Canberra suburb of Dunlop named after him shortly after his death in 1993. His image is on the 1995 issue Australian fifty cent piece with the words "They Served Their Country in World War II, 1939 – 1945". The fifty cent piece is part of a set including the one dollar coin and the twenty cent piece. He has a platoon named after him in the Army Recruit Training Centre, Blamey Barracks, Kapooka. Weary Dunlop Platoon is a platoon for recruits to conduct their final medical appointments and other administration prior to discharging from the army.

He was on one of 1995 Australia Remembers 45c stamps.

== See also ==
- Weary Dunlop Shield (2011–2024), formerly an annual match contested between the Melbourne Rebels and the New South Wales Waratahs.
