= Philip Meninsky =

- Born: Philip Rex Meninsky; November 1, 1919; Kilburn, Middlesex, England
- Died: 2007 (aged 87–88)
- Other name: Philip Menin
- Occupation: Artist
- Known for: Drawings documenting the lives of Far East POWs on the Burma Railway

Philip Meninsky (Later Philip Menin; 1919 – 2007) was a British artist known for his work documenting the lives of Far East POWs forced to construct the Burmese Railway.

== Biography ==
Philip Rex Meninsky was born on 1 November 1919 in Kilburn, Middlesex (present-day, London) to Margaret Meninsky (née O'Connor) and Bernard Meninsky, a painter, drafter and teacher. Despite an early passion for art, at his father's wish, he initially trained as an accountant, before being called up for National Service.

After a first posting to Scotland, he was then sent to the Far East where he was captured in 1942 after the fall of Singapore.

He spent the next three years working on the Death Railway where he recorded the lives of POWs by secretly making detailed drawings of camp life. These drawings were subsequently used as evidence in the trials of war criminals.

At one point, rendered skeletal by starvation, he developed tropical ulcers on his legs, and was transferred to Chunkai hospital camp, where his limbs were saved from amputation by Edward Dunlop and Major Arthur Moon.

Meninsky was discharged from the army on 6 May 1946.

His work from this period is largely held by the Imperial War Museum in London, England, but there is at least one in the State Library of Victoria in Australia, and the Australian War Memorial.

Along with works by Jack Bridger Chalker, Ashley George Old, and Ronald Searle, these drawings and paintings are among the few visual records created by prisoners during their captivity.

Old and Meninsky were reunited in 1995 after 50 years as guests of the Imperial War Museum for an exhibition Victory in the Far East – held 15 August to 15 December 1995.
