= List of compositions by Malcolm Williamson =

This is a list of compositions by Malcolm Williamson. It is sorted chronologically by genre.

== Operas ==
- Our Man in Havana (1963), opera in three acts; based on the novel by Graham Greene, libretto by Sidney Gilliat
- English Eccentrics (1964), chamber opera in two acts; based on the book by Edith Sitwell, libretto by Geoffrey Dunn
- The Happy Prince (1965), opera in one act; libretto by the composer, after the short story by Oscar Wilde
- Julius Caesar Jones (1965–66), children's opera in two acts; libretto by Geoffrey Dunn
- The Violins of Saint-Jacques (1966), opera in three acts; based on the 1953 novel by Patrick Leigh Fermor, libretto by William Chappell
- The Brilliant and the Dark (1966), choral operetta; libretto by Ursula Vaughan Williams
- Dunstan and the Devil (1967), children's opera in one act; libretto by Geoffrey Dunn
- The Growing Castle (1968), opera in two acts; based on A Dream Play by August Strindberg, libretto by the composer
- Lucky Peter's Journey (1969), comedy in three acts; libretto by Edmund Tracey after the play Lycko-Pers resa by August Strindberg
- The Red Sea (1972), opera in one act; libretto by the composer

== Ballets ==
- The Display (1963), choreographed by Robert Helpmann
- Sinfonietta (1965), symphonic work, choreographed in 1967 by Sir Frederick Ashton for the Royal Ballet
- Sun into Darkness (1966), ballet in three acts
- Perisynthion (1974), originally intended to be choreographed by Robert Helpmann, though (as yet) it has not been danced
- Heritage (1985), ballet in three tableaux, choreographed by Phyllis Kempster for West Midlands Youth Ballet
- Have Steps Will Travel (1988)

== Cassations ==
Williamson used the word cassation in the sense of a miniature opera including audience participation. He wrote ten such works, of varying complexity and duration. His primary intention was to teach children the mechanics of putting on an opera, and the idea for the pieces first came to Williamson while teaching his own children about music. Williamson had a great deal of success with these cassations, which have had performances in Britain, Australia, France, the US, and in hospitals in Tanzania and Zambia.

- The Moonrakers (1967), premièred at the Trinity College of Music, London
- Knights in Shining Armour (1968), for Peirs Russell-Cobb
- The Snow Wolf (1968)
- Genesis (1971), premièred by the Children's Choir Camp in the Diocese of Western North Carolina
- The Stone Wall (1971), commissioned by the BBC Proms. Premièred at the Last Night of the Proms on 18 September 1971 by the BBC Symphony Orchestra conducted by Sir Colin Davis, in the Royal Albert Hall, London
- The Winter Star (1973), commissioned by the Arts Council of Great Britain. Premièred on 19 June 1973 at the Holm Cultram Festival, directed by Andrew Seivewright
- The Glitter Gang (1974), commissioned by the Australian Broadcasting Commission. Premièred at Sydney Town Hall on 23 February 1974 by children's choirs and the Sydney Symphony Orchestra, conducted by John Hopkins.
- The Terrain of Kings (1974), commissioned by, and dedicated to, Jeunesses Musicales. Premièred in spring, 1975 in France.
- The Valley and the Hill (1977), commissioned by the Liverpool Education Authority. Premièred in the presence of the Queen and the Duke of Edinburgh at Hope Street Cathedral on 21 June 1977, by the Royal Liverpool Philharmonic Orchestra and a cast of 18,000 children.
- The Devil's Bridge (1982), premièred in Angoulême, France.

== Orchestral works ==
- Santiago de Espada (1956), overture for orchestra
- Symphony No. 1 – Elevamini (1957), for orchestra
- Piano Concerto No. 1 (1958), for piano and orchestra
- Piano Concerto No. 2 (1960), for piano and string orchestra
- Organ Concerto (1961), for organ and orchestra
- Piano Concerto No. 3 (1962), for piano and orchestra
- Sinfonia Concertante (1962), for three trumpets and piano soli, and string orchestra
- Our Man in Havana, Concert Suite (1963), for voices and orchestra
- Our Man in Havana, Orchestral Suite (1963/66), for orchestra
- The Display, Concert Suite (1964), for orchestra
- The Merry Wives of Windsor (1964), for orchestra
- Sinfonietta (1965), for orchestra
- Violin Concerto (1965), for violin and orchestra
- Concerto Grosso (1965), for orchestra
- Symphonic Variations (1965), for orchestra
- Serenade and Aubade (1965), for chamber orchestra
- Sun into Darkness (1966), for orchestra
- Six English Lyrics (1966–67), for low voice and strings
- Epitaphs for Edith Sitwell (1966/72), for string orchestra
- Symphony No. 2 – Pilgrim på havet (1968), for orchestra
- A Word from Our Founder (1969), for orchestra
- Symphony No. 3 – The Icy Mirror (1972), for soprano, mezzo-soprano and two baritone soli, SATB choir and orchestra
- Concerto for Two Pianos and String Orchestra (1972)
- Hammarskjöld Portrait (1974), song cycle for soprano and string orchestra
- Perisynthion (1974), for orchestra
- Les Olympiques (1976), song cycle for mezzo-soprano and string orchestra
- Harp Concerto – Au tombeau du martyr juif inconnu (1976) for harp and string orchestra
- The House of Windsor, Suite (1977), for orchestra (extracted from the music for the TV series)
- Ochre (1977), for orchestra or organ and string orchestra
- Symphony No. 4 – Jubilee (1977), for orchestra
- Fiesta (1978), for orchestra
- Azure (1978), for orchestra
- Fanfarade (1979), for orchestra
- Symphony No. 5 – Aquerò (1979–1980), for orchestra
- Lament in Memory of Lord Mountbatten of Burma (1980), for violin and string orchestra
- Ode for Queen Elizabeth (1980), for string trio and string orchestra
- Tribute to a Hero (1981), for baritone and orchestra
- In Thanksgiving – Sir Bernard Heinze (1982), for orchestra
- Symphony No. 6 – Liturgy of Homage to the Australian Broadcasting Commission in its Fiftieth Year as University to the Australian Nation (1982), for orchestra
- Two Pieces (circa 1983), for string orchestra
- Camargue Scenes (198?), for string orchestra
- Symphony No. 7 – Symphony for Strings (1984), for string orchestra
- Cortège for a Warrior (1984), for orchestra
- Lento for Strings (1985), for string orchestra
- Heritage (1985), for orchestra
- Next Year in Jerusalem (1985), song cycle for soprano and orchestra
- Saxophone Concerto Concertino for Charles (1987), for saxophone and orchestral winds
- Bicentennial Anthem (1988), for orchestra
- Bratsvo – Brotherhood (1988), for orchestral winds
- Piano Concerto No. 4 (1994), for piano and orchestra
- A Year of Birds (1995), song cycle for soprano and orchestra
- With Proud Thanksgiving (1995), for orchestra

== Choral works ==
- Two Motets (1954), for a cappella SATB choir
- Mass (1956), for a cappella SATB choir
- Adoremus (1959), Christmas cantata for alto and tenor soli, SATB choir and organ
- Dawn Carol (1960), for a cappella SATB choir
- Agnus Dei (1961), for SATB choir and organ
- Dignus est Agnus (1961), for soprano solo, SATB choir and organ
- Ascendit Deus (1961), for SATB choir and organ
- Procession of Palms (1961), for SATB choir and organ
- Tu es Petrus (1961), cantata for speaker, SATB choir and organ
- Easter Carol (1962), for a cappella SATB choir
- Harvest Thanksgiving (1962), for SATB and organ
- Jesu, Lover of my Soul (1962), for soprano, alto, tenor, bass soli, SATB choir and organ
- Let Them Give Thanks (1962), for congregation, SATB choir and organ
- O Planctus (1962), for a cappella TB choir
- Symphony for Voices (1962), for a cappella SATB choir
- The Morning of the Day of Days (1962), for soprano and tenor soli, SATB choir and organ
- Twelve New Hymn Tunes (1962), for unison/two-part choir and organ
- Wrestling Jacob (1962), for soprano solo, SATB choir and organ
- An Australian Carol (1963), for SATB choir and organ
- Six Christmas Songs for the Young (1963), unison choir and piano, with optional percussion
- Six Wesley Songs for the Young (1963), unison choir and piano
- Good King Wenceslas (1963), for SATB choir and organ
- Ding Dong Merrily on High (1963), for a cappella SATB choir
- Te Deum (1963), for congregation, unison choir and organ
- The Boar's Head Carol (1964), a cappella SATB choir
- English Eccentrics Choral Suite (1964), for a cappella SATB double choir
- Epiphany Carol (1964), for soprano solo, SATB choir and organ
- Mass of Saint Andrew (1964), unison choir and organ/piano
- Six Evening Hymns (1964), for a cappella unison choir
- North Country Songs (1965), low voice solo, SATB choir and piano
- Psalm of Praise (1965), for unison choir and organ
- A Birthday (1966), for SATB choir and piano
- Jenny Kiss'd Me (1966), for a cappella TB choir
- Sweet and Low (1966), for SA choir and piano
- Canon for Stravinsky (1967), for a cappella SATB choir
- Mowing the Barley (1967), for SATB choir and orchestra
- Six English Lyrics (1967), for SATB choir and string orchestra
- Carol Arrangements (1969), for a cappella SATB double choir
- O Sanctissima (1969), for SATB choir and piano
- Sonnet "On Hearing the Dies Irae Sung in the Sistine Chapel" (1969), for a cappella SATB choir
- The Brilliant and the Dark (1969), pageant for two soprano and two alto soli, SSAA choir and orchestra
- Cantate Domino (1970), SATB choir and organ
- I Will Lift Up Mine Eyes (1970), for unison choir, echo choir and organ
- In Place of Belief (1970), for SATB choir and two pianos
- Te Deum Laudamus (1971), for SATB choir, brass ensemble and organ
- Love, the Sentinel (1972), for a cappella SATB choir
- Carols of King David (1972), for congregation, unison choir and organ
- O Jerusalem (1972), for congregation, unison choir and organ
- The King of Love (1972), for congregation, unison choir and organ
- The Musicians of Bremen (1972), for a cappella AATBarBB choir
- Together in Unity (1972), for congregation, unison choir and organ
- Canticle of Fire (1973), SATB choir and organ (with extensive org. solo passages)
- Ode to Music (1973), for SATB choir, SATB echo choir and orchestra
- Symphony No. 3 – The Icy Mirror (1973), for soprano, mezzo-soprano and two baritone soli, SATB choir and orchestra
- The World at the Manger (1973), Christmas cantata for soprano and baritone soli, SATB choir and organ/piano duet
- Communion Hallelujas (1974–75), for SATB choir and organ
- Sixteen Hymns and Processionals (1975), for unison voices and piano/organ
- This is my Father's World (1975), for SATB choir and organ
- Love, Dove and Above Chorales (1975), for voices and piano/organ/guitar.
- Mass of St. James (1975), for unison voices and organ/piano
- Psalms of the Elements (1975), for unison voices/SATB choir and organ
- Jubilee Hymn (1977), for unison choir, SATB choir and orchestra
- This Christmas Night (1977), carol for SATB choir and piano/organ
- Mass of Christ the King (1977–1978), for lyric soprano, dramatic soprano, tenor and baritone soli, SATB choir, SATB echo choir and orchestra
- Kerygma (1979), for SATB choir and organ
- Little Mass of Saint Bernadette (1980), unison choir, instrumental ensemble and organ
- Mass of the People of God (1980), for SATB choir and organ
- Three Choric Hymns (1980), for a cappella SATB choir
- Now Is The Singing Day (1981), for mezzo-soprano and baritone soli, SATB choir, two pianos, percussion and string orchestra
- Mass of Saint Margaret of Scotland (1982), unison choir/SATB choir and organ/piano
- A Pilgrim Liturgy (1984), mezzo-soprano and baritone soli, SATB choir and orchestra
- Songs for a Royal Baby (1985), for SATB soli/choir and string orchestra
- Easter in St. Mary's Church (1987), for SATB choir and organ/piano
- Galilee (1987), for a cappella SATB choir
- A Book of Christmas Carols (1988), for unison voices and piano/organ
- The True Endeavour (1988), for speaker, SATB choir and orchestra
- The Dawn Is At Hand (1988–1989), for SATB choir and orchestra
- Our Church Lives (1989), for SATB choir and organ
- Beyond the Sun and the Moon (1990), for speaker, children's choir and orchestra
- Mass of Saint Etheldreda (1990), for SATB choir and organ
- Requiem for a Tribe Brother (1992), for a cappella SATB choir

== Works for voice ==
- A Vision of Beasts and Gods (1958), song cycle for high voice and piano
- Celebration of Divine Love (1963), song cycle for high voice and piano
- Hasselbacher's Scena (1963), for bass and piano
- Three Shakespeare Songs (1963), for high voice and guitar/piano
- A Christmas Carol (1964), for low voice and piano
- North Country Songs (1965), for low voice and piano
- Six English Lyrics (1966–67), for low voice and piano/strings
- From a Child's Garden (1968), song cycle for high voice and piano
- In Place of Belief (1970), for four solo voices and piano duet
- Death of Cuchulain (1971), for five male voices and percussion
- The Musicians of Bremen (1972), for six male voices
- Pietà (1973), for soprano, oboe, bassoon and piano
- Tribute to a Hero (1981), song cycle for voice and piano
- Songs for a Royal Baby (1985), for soprano, alto, tenor, bass soli and piano/strings
- Vocalise (1985), soprano and piano
- Day that I have Loved (1986), for low voice and piano
- Feast of Euridice (1986), for voice, flute, percussion and piano
- The Mower to the Glow-worms (1986), for low voice and piano
- The White Island (1986), for low voice and piano
- White Dawns (1986), song cycle for baritone and piano
- New work (1993), for voice and harp

== Chamber music ==
- String Quartet No. 2 (1954)
- Variations (1964), for cello and piano
- Concerto for Two Pianos and wind quintet (1965)
- Pas de Quatre (1967), for flute, oboe, clarinet, bassoon and piano
- Serenade (1967), for flute, piano, violin, viola and cello
- Sonata for Two Pianos (1967)
- Piano Quintet (1968), for two violins, viola, cello and piano
- Pas de Deux (1972), for clarinet and piano
- Adelaide Fanfare (1973), for two trumpets, two horns, two trombones, tuba and organ
- Canberra Fanfare (1973), for two trumpets, two trombones and percussion
- Music for a Quiet Day (1976), for concert band
- Piano Trio (1976), for violin, cello and piano
- Konstanz Fanfare (1980), for five trumpets, four horns, two tenor trombones, two bass trombones, tuba, two percussion and organ
- Richmond Fanfare (1980), five trumpets, four horns, two tenor trombones, two bass trombones, tuba, percussion and organ
- Fontainebleau Fanfare (1981), for five trumpets, four horns, two tenor trombones, two bass trombones, tuba, two percussion and organ
- Champion Family Album (1984–85), for flute and clarinet, with optional guitar and percussion parts
- Springtime on the River Moskva (1986), for two pianos
- Pas de Trois (1987), for two pianos
- Ceremony for Oodgeroo (1988), for brass quintet
- Fanfare of Homage (1988), for military band
- Channukkah Sketches (1990), for flute and guitar
- Tableau No. 1 (1990), for two pianos
- Fanfares and Chorales (1991), for brass quintet
- String Quartet No. 3 (1993)

[the String Quartet No. 1, subtitled Winterset, which dates from 1947 to 1948, remains unpublished.]

== Works for solo instruments ==
- Partita (1950), for piano
- Variations (1954), for piano
- Piano Sonata No. 1 (1956)
- Fons Amoris (1956), for organ
- Piano Sonata No. 2 (1957)
- Piano Sonata No. 3 (1958)
- Resurgence de Feu (1959), for organ
- Piano Sonata No. 4 (1959)
- Symphony (1960), for organ
- Travel Diaries (1961), for piano
- Vision of Christ-Phoenix (1962), for organ
- Elegy for J.F.K. (1964), for organ
- Epitaphs for Edith Sitwell (1966), for organ
- Peace Pieces (1971), for organ
- Little Carols of the Saints (1972), for organ
- Partita on Themes of Walton (1972), for viola
- Mass of a Medieval Saint (1973), for organ
- Haifa Watercolours (1974), for piano
- The Bridge Van Gogh Painted and the French Camargue (1974), for piano
- Fantasy on This is my Father's World (1975), for organ
- Fantasy on O Paradise (1976), for organ
- Ritual of Admiration (1976), for piano
- The Lion of Suffolk (1977), for organ
- Mass of the People of God – Offertoire – Dialogue des Choeurs (1980), for organ
- Hymna Titu (1984), for piano
- Symphony Day that I have Loved (1994), for harp

== Scores for film and TV ==
- The Timber Getters (1949), Australian documentary
- Inland with Sturt (1951), Australian film score
- Arid Land (1960), film score
- The Brides of Dracula (1960), Hammer horror film score
- Thunder in Heaven (1964), travel documentary
- North Sea Strike (1964), oil documentary
- September Spring (1964), BP film
- Rio Tinto Zinc (1965), TV documentary
- Crescendo (1970), Hammer horror film score
- The Horror of Frankenstein (1970), Hammer horror film score, directed by Jimmy Sangster
- Nothing But the Night (1972), film score, starring Christopher Lee and Peter Cushing
- Churchill's People (1974–75), many scores for TV-series
- The House of Windsor (1977), TV-series score
- Watership Down (1977), prologue and title music of film score
- The Masks of Death (1984), Sherlock Holmes film score, with Peter Cushing

== Musical theatre works ==
- No Bed for Bacon (1958), for Bristol Old Vic
- Make with the Mischief (1958), unperformed version of Shakespeare's A Midsummer Night's Dream
- Trilby (1959–61), based on the novel by George du Maurier

== Unfinished works ==
Williamson left a number of works unfinished at his death. These include a Strindberg-based opera Easter (with a libretto by Myfanwy Piper), a Symphony No. 8 Agamemnon (based on the poem by Dame Iris Murdoch), and sketches for a Piano Concerto No. 5, which he had hoped to write for his Australian friend, the pianist Antony Gray.

== Sources ==
- Malcolm Williamson: A Mischievous Muse (Paul Harris and Anthony Meredith), Boosey & Hawkes
