= Lord Babs (play) =

1925 play

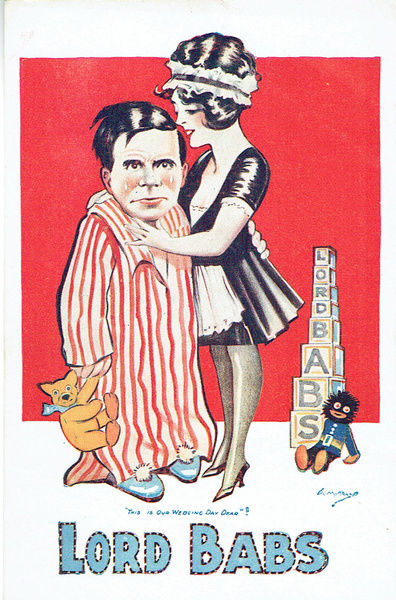
- Written by: Keble Howard
- Original language: English
- Genre: Comedy

Premiere
- Date premiered: 29 June 1925
- Place premiered: Kings Theatre, Southsea

Lord Babs is a comedy play by the British writer Keble Howard. A farce, the plot revolves around an aristocrat who has to pretend he is a small child in order to avoid being arrested.

It premiered at the Kings Theatre, Southsea in Hampshire in 1925. Donald Calthrop, the actor engaged to play the lead, had to withdraw at short notice due to illness. Keble Howard, the play's author and an amateur actor, stood in for the first two nights at Southsea while another professional actor prepared for the part. After Southsea, the play performed for a week each in Cardiff and Brighton, followed by two dates in North Wales.

Three years later it enjoyed a run of 142 performances in London's West End between 26 January and 19 June 1928, initially at the Vaudeville Theatre before transferring to the Criterion Theatre. The West End cast included Billy Merson, Hermione Baddeley, Lawrence Anderson and Joan Barry.

== Film adaptation ==
In 1932 it was adapted into a film of the same title directed by Walter Forde and starring Bobby Howes, Jean Colin and Alfred Drayton.

== Bibliography ==
- Goble, Alan (1999). The Complete Index to Literary Sources in Film. Walter de Gruyter.
- Wearing, J.P. (2014). The London Stage 1920-1929: A Calendar of Productions, Performers, and Personnel. Rowman & Littlefield. p. 116.
- Howard, Keble (1927). My Motley Life. Ernest Benn Ltd. OCLC 963619742.
