= Der Hexer =

Der Hexer may refer to:

- The Ringer (1932 film), an Austrian-German mystery film
- Der Hexer (1964 film), a West German black and white mystery film
