= Would You Believe It! =

1929 film

- Directed by: Walter Forde
- Written by: Walter Forde; Harry Fowler Mear
- Produced by: Archibald Nettlefold
- Starring: Walter Forde; Pauline Johnson; Arthur Stratton; Albert Brouett
- Cinematography: Geoffrey Faithfull
- Edited by: Culley Forde
- Music by: Paul Mulder
- Production company: Nettlefold Films
- Distributed by: Butcher's Film Service
- Release date: May 1929
- Running time: 57 minutes
- Country: United Kingdom
- Languages: Sound (Synchronized); English Intertitles

Would You Believe It! is a 1929 British silent comedy film directed by Walter Forde and starring Forde, Pauline Johnson and Arthur Stratton. It was made at the Nettlefold Studios in Walton-on-Thames and released as a supporting feature. Due to the general public's apathy toward silent films, it was quickly released in a sound version that features a synchronized musical score with sound effects.

== Plot ==
A British inventor develops a new high-tech tank and is pursued by foreign agents who wish to capture the design.

== Cast ==
- Walter Forde as Walter
- Pauline Johnson as Pauline
- Arthur Stratton as Cuthbert
- Albert Brouett as Spy
- Anita O'Day as Farmer's wife
- Anita Sharp-Bolster as Presbyterian
- Sidney Gilliat as Restaurant customer
- Ian Wilson as Restaurant customer

== Bibliography ==
- Chibnall, Steve. Quota Quickies: The Birth of the British 'B' film. British Film Institute, 2007.
- Low, Rachael. History of the British Film, 1918-1929. George Allen & Unwin, 1971.
- Wood, Linda. British Films, 1927-1939. British Film Institute, 1986.
