= Organ Concerto =

An organ concerto is an instrumental piece of music for a pipe organ soloist with an orchestra.

Not included in this definition are a number of solo organ works without orchestra, such as the organ concertos of J. S. Bach and his contemporaries.

Some examples of the Organ Concerto include:

- Organ concertos, Op. 4 (Handel)
- Organ concertos, Op. 7 (Handel)
- Organ Concerto (Leifs)
- Organ Concerto (Poulenc)
- Organ Concerto (Rouse)
- Organ Concerto (Williamson)
