= Our Man in Havana (disambiguation) =

Our Man in Havana may refer to:

- Our Man in Havana (1958), novel by Graham Greene
- Our Man in Havana (film) (1959), film based on the novel
- Our Man in Havana (opera) (1963), opera based on the novel
- Our Man in Havana (2007), play by Clive Francis based on the novel

== See also ==
- "Our Men in Havana", an episode of Auf Wiedersehen, Pet
