= Ian Wilson (actor) =

British actor (1901–1987)

- in The Glass Cage (1955)
- Born: Ian Macrae Hamish Wilson; 2 July 1901; Hampstead, London, England
- Died: December 1987 (aged 86); Exeter, Devon, England
- Occupation: Actor
- Years active: 1914–1973 (film)

Ian Macrae Hamish Wilson (2 July 1901 – December 1987) was an English small role actor who appeared in over 145 films during his career. Most were small uncredited roles often playing meek public servants, professional men or busy bodies. Film appearances included The Plank 1967, The Day of the Triffids 1962, Carry On Jack 1963, Two-Way Stretch 1960, Hell Drivers 1957, The Ugly Duckling 1959 and Rotten to the Core 1965. His first film appearance was in the silent A Master of Craft in 1922, and his last was in The Wicker Man in 1973. Several of his films were made by the Boulting brothers, who considered him a "good luck charm." Wilson died in December 1987 in Devon.

== Selected filmography ==
- A Master of Craft (1922)
- Through Fire and Water (1923) - Jimmy
- The Fighting Gladiator (1926) - J.C. Heenan
- Wait and See (1928) - Caddie
- Shooting Stars (1928) - Reporter
- What Next? (1928) - Wilson
- The Broken Melody (1929) - (uncredited)
- Would You Believe It! (1929) - Restaurant customer
- The Dizzy Limit (1930) - Callboy
- The Woman from China (1930) - Cabin boy
- Bed and Breakfast (1930) - Theodore (uncredited)
- Third Time Lucky (1931) - (uncredited)
- Sally in Our Alley (1931) - Boy Delivering Fish (uncredited)
- Splinters in the Navy (1931) - Call Boy
- Out of the Blue (1931) - Man in Leopard Skin (uncredited)
- Heroes of the Mine (1932) - Ponyboy (uncredited)
- His Lordship (1932) - Man Listening to the Speech (uncredited)
- Little Waitress (1932)
- Soldiers of the King (1933) - Customer at Coffee Stall (uncredited)
- Lucky Blaze (1933)
- Facing the Music (1933) - (uncredited)
- Britannia of Billingsgate (1933) - (uncredited)
- Love, Life and Laughter (1934) - (uncredited)
- The Unholy Quest (1934) - Wilky
- Those Were the Days (1934) - Tom Richardson (uncredited)
- Song at Eventide (1934)
- The Broken Rosary (1934) - Hodge
- City of Beautiful Nonsense (1935) - Extra (uncredited)
- Joy Ride (1935) - Tommy (uncredited)
- The Love Test (1935) - Chemist
- Birds of a Feather (1935) - Peter
- Play Up the Band (1935) - Rowland
- Father O'Flynn (1935)
- Things Are Looking Up (1935) - Drummer in Band (uncredited)
- Melody of My Heart (1936)
- Love in Exile (1936) - Bespectacled Man in Palace Kitchen (uncredited)
- Song of the Forge (1937) - Albert Meek
- The Vicar of Bray (1937) - (uncredited)
- Inquest (1939) - Jury Member (uncredited)
- Let George Do It! (1940) - Parker - Dinky Do (uncredited)
- Love on the Dole (1941) - Man at Demonstration (uncredited)
- Quiet Wedding (1941) - Bookstall Customer (uncredited)
- Atlantic Ferry (1941) - Extra (uncredited)
- We Dive at Dawn (1943) - Cigarette Customer (uncredited)
- The Dummy Talks (1943) - (uncredited)
- My Learned Friend (1943) - Stagehand (uncredited)
- The Demi-Paradise (1943) - Army Bandmaster (uncredited)
- The Volunteer (1944) - Carpenter (uncredited)
- The Hundred Pound Window (1944) - Mike - Reporter (uncredited)
- Don't Take It to Heart (1944) - Reporter in Court (uncredited)
- The Agitator (1945) - Office Worker (uncredited)
- Beware of Pity (1946) - Minor Role (uncredited)
- The Hills of Donegal (1947) - Stage Manager (uncredited)
- The Mark of Cain (1947) - Extra (uncredited)
- Vice Versa (1948) - Jury Foreman (uncredited)
- My Sister and I (1948) - Horsnell
- Bond Street (1948) - Extra (uncredited)
- It's Hard to Be Good (1948) - Fighting Neighbour (uncredited)
- The History of Mr. Polly (1949) - Mr. Clamp (uncredited)
- Marry Me! (1949) - Minor Role (uncredited)
- Trottie True (1949) - Bert (uncredited)
- The Lady Craved Excitement (1950) - Mugsy
- Seven Days to Noon (1950) - Sandwich-Board Man (uncredited)
- High Treason (1951) - Glass Collector (uncredited)
- The Magic Box (1951) - Minor Role (uncredited)
- The Last Page (1952) - Mushroom Book Customer (uncredited)
- Whispering Smith Hits London (1952) - Small Tough
- Treasure Hunt (1952) - (uncredited)
- Mother Riley Meets the Vampire (1952) - Hitchcock - the butler
- Meet Me Tonight (1952) - Call Boy (segment "Red Peppers")
- Miss Robin Hood (1952) - (uncredited)
- The Floating Dutchman (1952) - Herring (uncredited)
- Hindle Wakes (1952) - Mr. Slaughter
- The Flanagan Boy (1953) - Audience Member with Thick Glasses (uncredited)
- Sailor of the King (1953) - Waiter (uncredited)
- The Saint's Girl Friday (1953) - Man Waiting for Telephone Booth (uncredited)
- Trouble in Store (1953) - Onlooker (uncredited)
- The Million Pound Note (1954) - Photographer (uncredited)
- Seagulls Over Sorrento (1954) - Extra (uncredited)
- Up to His Neck (1954) - Friday's Husband (uncredited)
- Time Is My Enemy (1954) - (uncredited)
- Radio Cab Murder (1954) - Second Bank Nighwatchman (uncredited)
- One Good Turn (1955) - Number 14 (uncredited)
- The Brain Machine (1955) - Personnel Manager
- The Glass Cage (1955) - Man Eating Sandwich (uncredited)
- See How They Run (1955) - Extra (uncredited)
- Miss Tulip Stays the Night (1955) - Police Photographer
- Value for Money (1955) - Extra (uncredited)
- One Way Out (1955) - Music Shop Customer (uncredited)
- The Adventures of Quentin Durward (1955) - Hunchback (uncredited)
- Man of the Moment (1955) - Extra (uncredited)
- Portrait of Alison (1955) - Dorking's Customer (uncredited)
- Private's Progress (1956) - Party Guest (uncredited)
- Jumping for Joy (1956) - Man in Phone Box During Fight (uncredited)
- Invitation to the Dance (1956) - Man Exiting Stage Door in 'Ring Around the Rosy' (uncredited)
- A Touch of the Sun (1956) - Ministry of Health Official (uncredited)
- Hra o zivot (1956)
- My Wife's Family (1956) - (uncredited)
- Stars in Your Eyes (1956) - Man on Stairwell (uncredited)
- Up in the World (1956) - Man in Queue (uncredited)
- The Big Money (1956) - Post Office Clerk (uncredited)
- Brothers in Law (1957) - Undertaker's Assistant
- The Good Companions (1957) - Mr. Droke
- Kill Me Tomorrow (1957) - Marty
- The Key Man (1957) - Process Server
- How to Murder a Rich Uncle (1957) - Postman
- Hell Drivers (1957) - Gibson, Hawlett Paymaster (uncredited)
- Lucky Jim (1957) - Glee Singer
- Just My Luck (1957) - 2nd Gas Man (uncredited)
- Morning Call (1957) - Herbert (uncredited)
- Rx Murder (1958) - Extra (uncredited)
- Happy Is the Bride (1958) - Umpire
- The Square Peg (1958) - Extra (uncredited)
- Carlton-Browne of the F.O. (1959) - Onlooker (uncredited)
- Idol on Parade (1959) - Man in Cinema (uncredited)
- The Ugly Duckling (1959) - Small Man
- I'm All Right Jack (1959) - Evangelist
- A Woman's Temptation (1959) - (uncredited)
- Top Floor Girl (1959) - (uncredited)
- Suddenly, Last Summer (1959) - A Patient (uncredited)
- Two Way Stretch (1960) - Milkman
- Carry On Constable (1960) - (uncredited)
- A French Mistress (1960) - (uncredited)
- Suspect (1960) - Pin Table Man
- Feet of Clay (1961) - Signwriter
- Carry On Regardless (1961) - Advertising Man (uncredited)
- Raising the Wind (1961) - Street Musician - Drummer
- Postman's Knock (1962)
- Carry On Cruising (1962) - Passenger (uncredited)
- Two and Two Make Six (1962) - Sevenhills City Council Official (uncredited)
- The Phantom of the Opera (1962) - Phantom's Lackey
- The Day of the Triffids (1962) - Greenhouse Watchman
- The Boys (1962) - (uncredited)
- The Iron Maiden (1962) - Sidney Webb
- Heavens Above! (1963) - Salvation Army Major
- Carry On Cabby (1963) - Man in Cab
- West 11 (1963) - Man on Stairs (uncredited)
- Carry On Jack (1963) - Old Carrier
- Carry On Cleo (1964) - Small Messenger
- San Ferry Ann (1965) - (uncredited)
- Rotten to the Core (1965) - Chopper Parsons
- Help! (1965) - Power Station Man (uncredited)
- The Sandwich Man (1966) - (uncredited)
- Casino Royale (1967) - British Army Officer (uncredited)
- The Plank (1967) - Driver's Mate
- Tell Me Lies (1968)
- Oh! What a Lovely War (1969) - Salvation Army (uncredited)
- The Wicker Man (1973) - Communicant (final film role)
