= Leonard Dommett =

Australian musician (1928–2006)

Leonard Bertram Dommett OBE (21 December 1928 – 11 April 2006) was an Australian violinist, conductor, and teacher.

== Early life and education ==
Leonard Dommett was born in Toowoomba, Queensland, where his father ran a general store. His grandparents had performed professionally in concerts and summer entertainments in the beach towns of southern England, at which Charlie Chaplin had once performed as a guest artist. He had four talented siblings: one brother played bassoon and saxophone; another became an actor; a sister was a pianist and she and Leonard often played together; and another sister was an actress.

He first handled a violin at age 4. At age 14 he won the 1942 Queensland Eisteddfod Championship in violin playing. He was offered a scholarship to Trinity College at the London School of Music, but World War II prevented him accepting it. Instead, he went to the Conservatorium of Music at the University of Melbourne, where the pianist Max Cooke became one of his closest friends.

== Career ==
=== Performing career ===
In 1949, Marie Rambert brought her ballet to Australia, and she appointed Dommett as a solo violinist. He passed his first test, accompanying a ballet set to Ernest Chausson's Poème. Rambert was so impressed that she made him her concert master, and later her conductor. He moved with the company to New Zealand and then to London. There he played with the London Symphony, London Philharmonic and Royal Philharmonic orchestras. He became assistant conductor at the Royal Opera House, Covent Garden.

He returned to Australia in 1953 and played with the Queensland and Sydney symphony orchestras. In 1961 he became leader and later deputy conductor of the South Australian Symphony Orchestra. In 1965 he became concertmaster of the Melbourne Symphony Orchestra (MSO), and later assistant conductor. He intermittently played with the London orchestras, but for the most part he remained in Melbourne till 1980. At a concert in Munich, he received a standing ovation after playing the Violin Concerto by Felix Werder; a performance by him of this piece, with the MSO, was released in 1971 on an LP from the now-defunct Festival label.

=== Teaching career ===
After he left the MSO he taught at the Canberra School of Music for the next two decades. Later he was music master and conductor at St Margaret's Girls School in Brisbane, where they performed Vivaldi's The Four Seasons and Fauré's Requiem, among several other works, under his direction.

Eight composers wrote violin concertos specifically for Dommett. He did a great deal of recording, including 56 concertos, and a disc of Mozart violin sonatas with Max Cooke. In addition, he conducted the London Philharmonic Orchestra in the premiere recording of Malcolm Williamson's Piano Concerto No. 3, with the composer as soloist.

He played a 1727 Peter Guarneri violin, which was offered for sale in 2008.

== Personal life ==
In 1954 he married Wanda Jones, and they had two children. In 1977 he married Elizabeth Curnow née Taylor.

In 1992 he married Ann Dolan and acquired two stepsons. They moved to Bribie Island, where he played regularly in the local church, and where he died, aged 77, on 11 April 2006.

== Honours and awards ==
- In 1977 he was appointed an Officer of the Order of the British Empire (OBE).

=== Bernard Heinze Memorial Award ===
The Sir Bernard Heinze Memorial Award is given to a person who has made an outstanding contribution to music in Australia.

Year	Nominee / work	Award	Result
1992	Leonard Dommett	Sir Bernard Heinze Memorial Award	awarded

== Sources ==
- Philip Jones, obituary: A true professional with bow or baton, The Age, 4 May 2006
