= A Sailor Tramp =

1922 film

- Directed by: Floyd Martin Thornton
- Written by: Bart Kennedy (novel); Eliot Stannard
- Produced by: George Pearson
- Starring: Victor McLaglen; Pauline Johnson; Hugh E. Wright; Ambrose Manning
- Production company: Welsh-Pearson
- Distributed by: Jury Films
- Release date: July 1922
- Running time: 5,800 feet
- Country: United Kingdom
- Languages: Silent; English intertitles

A Sailor Tramp is a 1922 British silent adventure film directed by Floyd Martin Thornton and starring Victor McLaglen, Pauline Johnson and Hugh E. Wright. It was based on a 1902 novel by Bart Kennedy.

== Cast ==
- Victor McLaglen as The Sailor Tramp
- Pauline Johnson as The Girl
- Hugh E. Wright as The Cockney
- Ambrose Manning as The Father
- Harry Worth as The Foreman
- Bertie Wright as The Proprietor
- Kate Gurney as The Mother
- Mrs. Hubert Willis as Aunt

== Bibliography ==
- Low, Rachael. History of the British Film, 1918-1929. George Allen & Unwin, 1971.
