= Lord Babs =

1932 film

- Directed by: Walter Forde
- Written by: Clifford Grey; Angus MacPhail; Sidney Gilliat; Robert Stevenson
- Based on: Lord Babs by Keble Howard
- Produced by: Michael Balcon
- Starring: Bobby Howes; Jean Colin; Pat Paterson; Alfred Drayton
- Cinematography: Leslie Rowson
- Edited by: Ian Dalrymple
- Music by: Louis Levy
- Production company: Gainsborough Pictures
- Distributed by: Ideal Pictures
- Release date: February 1932
- Running time: 77 minutes
- Country: United Kingdom
- Language: English

Lord Babs is a 1932 British comedy film directed by Walter Forde and starring Bobby Howes, Jean Colin and Pat Paterson. It was written by Clifford Grey, Angus MacPhail, Sidney Gilliat and Robert Stevenson, based on the 1925 play of the same title by Keble Howard.

== Preservation status ==
In 1992 the British Film Institute classified Lord Babs as a lost film, but it has since been found and is now held at the BFI National Archive.

== Plot ==
Basil is a steward on an ocean liner and unexpectedly inherits a title and a fortune. Depite already being engaged to Clare Foster, a nurse, he becomes engaged to Helen, the daughter of pork-pie magnate Ambrose Parker, to whom he owes money. To escape the situation, Basil pretends to be mentally disturbed, dressing and acting as a baby.

== Cast ==
- Bobby Howes as Lord Basil 'Babs' Drayford
- Jean Colin as Nurse Foster
- Pat Paterson as Helen Parker
- Alfred Drayton as Ambrose Parker
- Arthur Chesney as Mr Turpin
- Clare Greet as Mrs Parker
- Hugh Dempster as Dr. Neville
- Joe Cunningham as Chief Steward

== Reception ==
Film Weekly wrote: "As a whole, it is ingeniously produced, luxuriously mounted, and brightly played. If it misfires in places, neither the director, Walter Forde, nor the hard-working cast, can be blamed. The fault lies in the material, not in the treatment."

Kine Weekly wrote: "Elaborately staged farcical comedy with a strong cast, as adapted from the stage play by Keble Howard. It is rather uneven in quality but, after a slow start, works up to a hilarious and boisterous climax. Although Bobby Howes and Jean Colin make the most of the material at their command, it is Alfred Drayton who holds the picture together, and is responsible for most of the entertainment. Music which forms an integral part of the treatment helps to create a good atmosphere. Good comedy entertainment for the masses."

The Daily Film Renter wrote: "Vigorous, well-produced farce, based on Keble Howard's musical extravaganza. Bright and brisk, the film adds to Gainsborough and British prestige, challenging technical comparison with belauded foreign films in the same genre. Musical items elaborate and ingenious; clever photography; excellent work of Bobby Howes one of the highlights. Amount of humour involved in dressing a man in children's clothes and treating him as a two-year-old is necessarily limited, but every ounce of humour is enthusiastically exploited by capable star cast. Popular audiences will roar continuously."

Picturegoer wrote: "Treatment is much too slow for this type of conventional farce and, while the interpolated music is tuneful, it is not too well put over."
