= The Barton Mystery (1920 film) =

1920 British film by Harry T. Roberts

The Barton Mystery is a 1920 British silent crime film directed by Harry T. Roberts, produced by Oswald Stoll and starring Lyn Harding, Hilda Bayley and Arthur Pusey It ran 72 minutes in length. The screenplay was written by R. Byron-Webber, based on the eponymous stage play by Walter C. Hackett, which was first staged in England in October, 1917. The cinematographer was E. Harvey Harrison.

Producer Stoll emigrated to England from Australia, and opened a chain of British movie theaters and later moved into film production. He formed Stoll Picture Productions in 1919, and made seven feature films that year alone. When his longer length films didn't do well, he switched to making short subjects adapting best-selling novels of the day, featuring characters such as Sherlock Holmes and Fu Manchu. He chose to make this film based on the success of the film Mr. Wu, which came out in 1919. Stoll tended toward xenophobia, hence he would generally make non-white foreigners the guilty party in his films. He followed this film up with another "Yellow Peril" film, The Yellow Claw by Sax Rohmer, which in turn was followed by twenty-three short Fu Manchu movies He later became a philanthropist and received a knighthood in 1919 for his charity work, finding housing for military veterans with mental illnesses.

== Plot ==
Beverly Barton attempts to blackmail Mrs. Standish with some scandalous letters, and is murdered soon after in his apartment. Mrs. Standish's brother-in-law to be, Harry Maitland, is suspected of shooting him, since he had gone to Barton's apartment earlier to try to retrieve the incriminating letters. A psychic is called in to hold a seance in order to determine the real killer's identity. It is revealed that Barton's Japanese butler was the guilty party. Although the film is more of a murder mystery, there are enough sinister goings on in the film to qualify it for the horror genre as well.

== Cast ==
- Lyn Harding - Beverley Barton
- Hilda Bayley - Ethel Standish
- Arthur Pusey - Harry Maitland
- Vernon Jones - Phyllis Grey
- Maud Cressall - Mrs Barton
- Edward O'Neill - Richard Standish
- Ernest A. Cox - Sir Everard Marshall
- Eva Westlake - Lady Marshall
