= Wait and See (1928 film) =

1929 film by Walter Forde

- Directed by: Walter Forde
- Written by: Walter Forde; Patrick L. Mannock
- Produced by: Archibald Nettlefold
- Starring: Walter Forde; Frank Stanmore; Pauline Johnson; Sam Livesey
- Cinematography: Geoffrey Faithfull
- Edited by: Walter Forde
- Production company: Nettlefold Films
- Distributed by: Butcher's Film Service
- Release date: February 1928
- Country: United Kingdom
- Language: English

Wait and See is a 1928 British silent comedy film directed by Walter Forde and starring Frank Stanmore, Pauline Johnson and Sam Livesey.

== Cast ==
- Walter Forde as Monty Merton
- Frank Stanmore as Frankie
- Pauline Johnson as Jocelyn Winton
- Sam Livesey as Gregory Winton
- Mary Brough as Landlady
- Charles Dormer as Eustace Mottletoe
- Ian Wilson as Caddie
- Constance Wootten as various roles
