= The Ringer (1928 film) =

1928 film

- Directed by: Arthur Maude
- Written by: Edgar Wallace (novel)
- Starring: Leslie Faber; Annette Benson; Lawson Butt; Nigel Barrie
- Production company: British Lion Film Corporation
- Distributed by: Ideal (UK)
- Release date: 28 August 1928
- Running time: 86 minutes
- Country: United Kingdom
- Languages: Silent; English intertitles

The Ringer is a 1928 British silent crime film directed by Arthur Maude starring Leslie Faber, Annette Benson and Hayford Hobbs. It was based on the 1925 Edgar Wallace novel The Gaunt Stranger. Scotland Yard hunt for a dangerous criminal who has returned to Britain after many years away. A talkie version of The Ringer followed in 1931.

== Cast ==
- Leslie Faber as Dr. Lamond
- Annette Benson as Cora Ann Milton
- Lawson Butt as Maurice Meister
- Nigel Barrie as Insp. Wembury
- Hayford Hobbs as Insp. Bliss
- John F. Hamilton as John Lenley
- Charles Emerald as Sam Hackett
- Esther Rhodes as Gwenda Milton
- Muriel Angelus as Mary Lenley

== Background ==
The film is one of the six screen adaptations of Wallace's novel.

== See also ==
- The Ringer (1931)
- The Ringer (1932)
- The Gaunt Stranger (1938)
- The Ringer (1952)
- Der Hexer (1964)
