= Red Pearls =

1930 film

- Theatrical release poster
- Directed by: Walter Forde
- Written by: J. Randolph James (novel); Harry Fowler Mear; Sidney Gilliat
- Produced by: Archibald Nettlefold
- Starring: Lillian Rich; Frank Perfitt; Arthur Pusey; Frank Stanmore
- Cinematography: Geoffrey Faithfull
- Edited by: Culley Forde
- Music by: Paul Mulder
- Production company: Nettlefold Films
- Distributed by: Butcher's Film Service
- Release date: February 1930
- Running time: 70 minutes
- Country: United Kingdom
- Languages: Silent; English intertitles

Red Pearls is a 1930 British silent crime film directed by Walter Forde and starring Lillian Rich, Frank Perfitt and Arthur Pusey. It was written by Harry Fowler Mear and Sidney Gilliat based on the novel Nearer! Nearer! by J. Randolph James, and made at the Nettlefold Studios in Walton. The film was produced just as the change to sound films was taking place in Britain.

== Premise ==
A Japanese merchant attempts to drive one of his rivals mad by impersonating a man he had once murdered.

== Cast ==
- Lillian Rich as Sylvia Radshaw
- Frank Perfitt as Gregory Marston
- Arthur Pusey as Paul Gordon
- Frank Stanmore as Martin Radshaw
- Kiyoshi Takase as Tamira
- Gabrielle Brune
- Harold Saxon-Snell
- Henry Peterson
- Judy Hallatt
- Edgar Batten
- Jean Mackinley
- Margaret Swallow

== Reception ==
Kine Weekly wrote: "Ingenious mystery melodrama which succeeds in holding the interest. It is not as clear in development as it might have been, but the locations of Londen and the South Seas provide a colourful atmosphere which considerably adds to the general effect. ... Frank Perfitt, who admittedly has a difficult role to portray as Marston, is not equal to the demands and considerably overacts. Lilian Rich does not make a particularly attractive heroine as Sylvia, nor does Arthur Pusey display any outstanding ability as the juvenile lead. ... Walter Forde, by telling the story in retrospect, makes it difficult for one to know exactly when one narrative ends and the other begins; this results in the picture being at times a little disjointed. He does, however, possess directorial skill, and succeeds in keeping the mystery well sustained."
