= The Hate Ship =

1929 film

- Directed by: Norman Walker
- Written by: Monckton Hoffe; Benn W. Levy; Eliot Stannard
- Starring: Jameson Thomas; Jean Colin; Jack Raine
- Cinematography: René Guissart
- Production company: British International Pictures
- Distributed by: First National-Pathé Pictures
- Release date: December 1929
- Running time: 83 minutes
- Country: United Kingdom
- Languages: Sound (All-Talking); English

The Hate Ship is an all-talking sound 1929 British mystery film directed by Norman Walker and starring Jameson Thomas, Jean Colin and Jack Raine. It was made at Elstree Studios by British International Pictures. It was based on a novel by Bruce Graeme.

== Cast ==
- Jameson Thomas as Vernon Wolfe
- Jean Colin as Sylvia Paget
- Jack Raine as Roger Peel
- Henry Victor as Count Boris Ivanoff
- Randle Ayrton as Captain MacDonnell
- Edna Davies as Lisette - Maid
- Carl Harbord as Arthur Wardell
- Allan Jeayes as Dr. Saunders
- Maria Minetti as Countess Olga Karova
- Charles Dormer as Nigel Menzies
- Ivo Dawson as Colonel Paget
- Syd Crossley as Rigby - Valet
- Charles Emerald as Bullock

== See also ==
- List of early sound feature films (1926–1929)

== Bibliography ==
- Wood, Linda. British Films, 1927-1939. British Film Institute, 1986.
