= Keble Howard =

English comic writer (1875–1928)

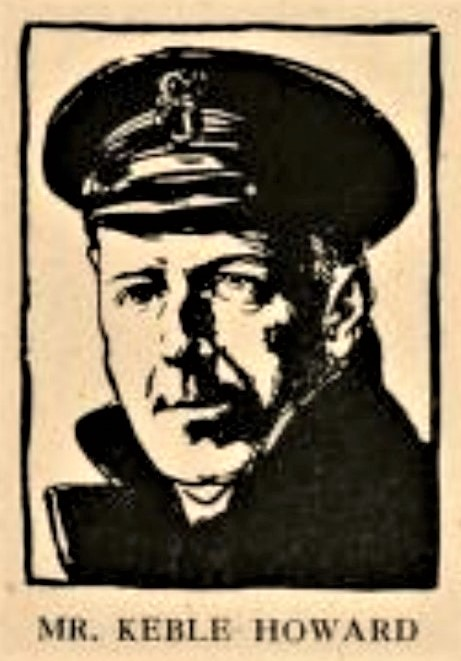
- An illustration in Canada in Khaki, that contained a short story by Keble Howard.
- Born: John Keble Bell; 8 June 1875; Basingstoke, Hampshire, England
- Died: 5 March 1928 (aged 52); Bournemouth, Hampshire, England, United Kingdom
- Known for: Novelist, short story writer and playwright

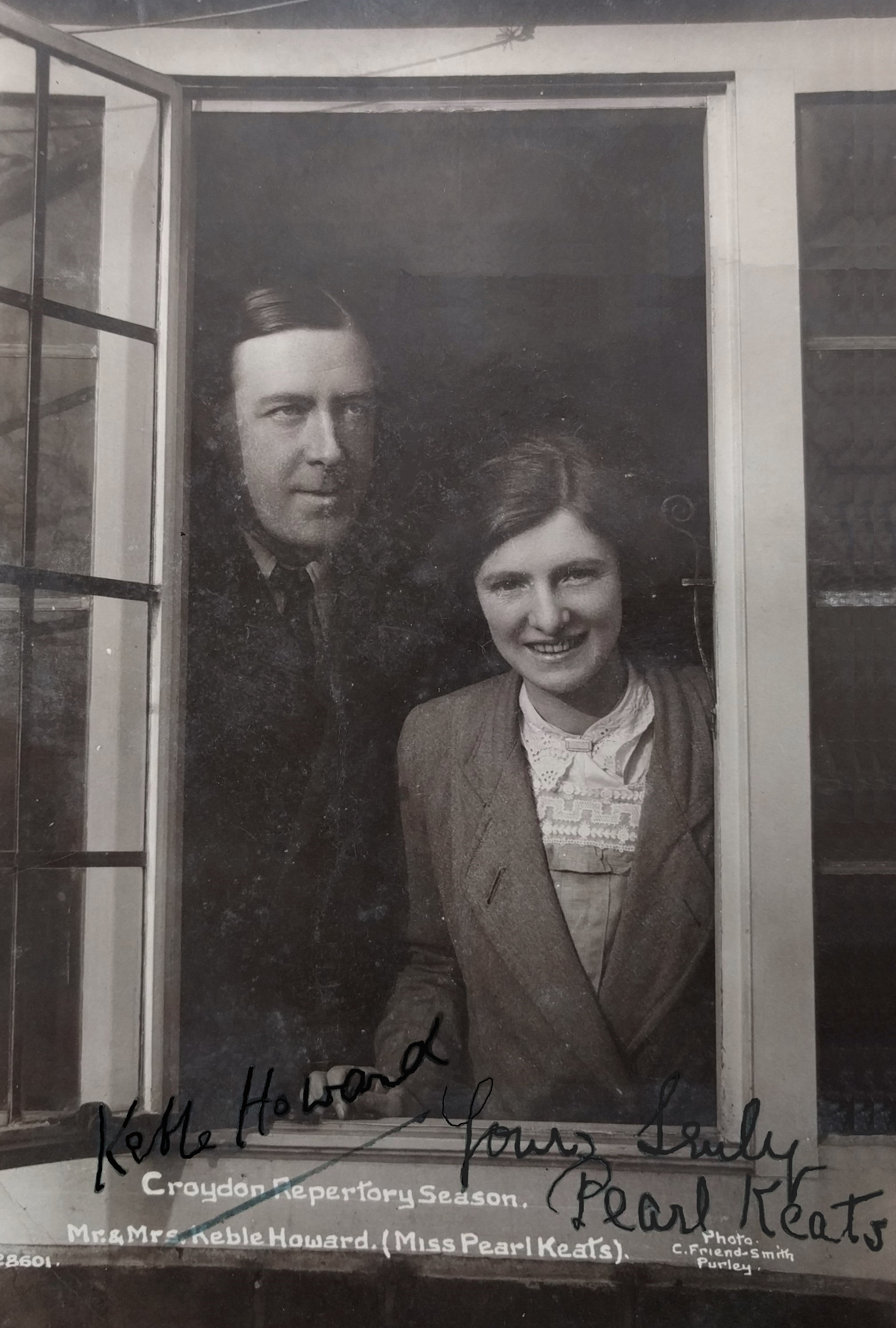
Howard and wife Pearl Keats. Autographed picture, c.1913

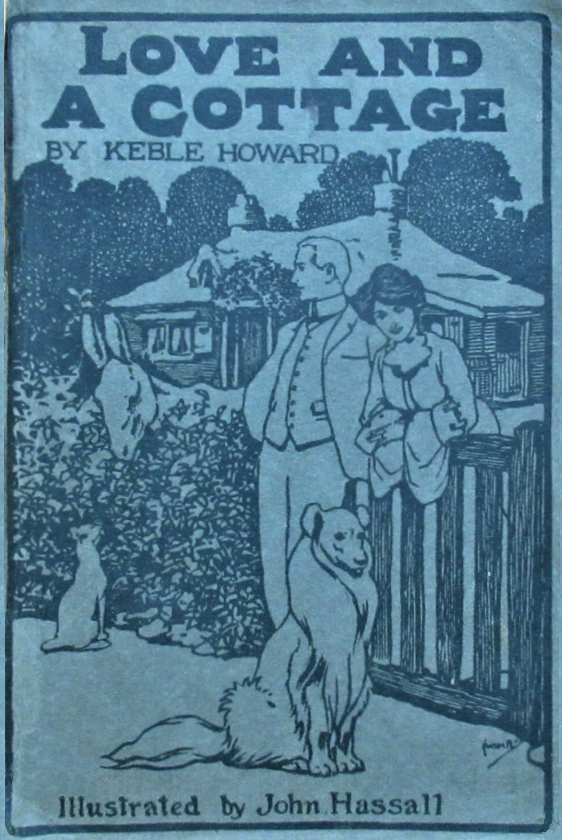
John Hassall's cover for Love and a Cottage, published 1903

Keble Howard was the pen name of John Keble Bell (8 June 1875 – 29 March 1928). He was an English writer and journalist, who wrote a large number of novels, short stories, sketches and plays, mainly light comic pieces, often depicting suburban life. One contemporary literary commentator described Howard as "a highly successful novelist and a moderately successful playwright".

== Life ==
John Keble Bell was born in Basingstoke in 1875, the third of the twelve children of the Reverend George Edward Bell. Soon after his birth, his father was appointed Vicar of Henley-in-Arden, Warwickshire and it was here that John grew up.

After attending King Alfred's School, Wantage he entered Worcester College, Oxford University, with the intention of becoming a clergyman. He however became disillusioned with the Church and, not attending his final year due to lack of funds, finally failed his degree. He then briefly worked as a schoolmaster before becoming a journalist. After short spells on the Bicester Advertiser and the Press Association, in 1899 he joined The Sketch, a weekly magazine covering high society, fashion and theatre, working first as assistant editor then, from 1902, as editor. In late 1904 he moved from The Sketch to the Daily Mail to act as dramatic critic, leaving in 1908 to concentrate on writing and the theatre. He however continued to contribute a weekly column to The Sketch under the heading Motley Notes, his final piece appearing on 14 March 1928, two weeks before his death.

He had been a published author of novels and short stories since 1901, with his first play in 1906. He wrote under the name 'Keble Howard', so as not to be confused with his brother, R. S. Warren Bell who also worked as a journalist and writer. He often used 'Keble Howard' for other business matters, but never formally changed his name. Howard was involved in the production of his plays, both in the West End and touring, and sometimes acted in them. In 1913 he established the Croydon Repertory Theatre which ran for two seasons until the outbreak of war.

In 1911 he married Florence Pearl Keats known professionally as Pearl Keats (1883–1962), an actress who appeared in a number of his productions.

During World War I Howard wrote a number of books and pamphlets in support of the war effort. Although over age, he volunteered for the armed forces, serving in administrative posts in England. In October 1915 he joined the Royal Navy as an able seaman, being invalided out four months later. In 1917 he was commissioned as a second lieutenant in the Royal Flying Corps and then the Royal Air Force, before being seconded to the newly formed Ministry of Information in 1918. Howard published his wartime reminiscences in 1919 under the title An Author in Wonderland.

Howard lived for most of his adult life in the south of England. Upon marriage in 1911, he moved from London to a house he named As You Like It in the Surrey village of Merstham, near Reigate and then to Hove in Sussex in about 1920. He died in a Bournemouth nursing home from heart failure on 29 March 1928 aged 52, the death described by The Sketch as "sudden and tragic". His wife did not remarry and died in 1962, they had no children.

== Books ==
In addition to the books below, mainly light comedy pieces, Keble Howard wrote a large number of short stories, sketches and poems, published both in magazines and as part of anthologies that included the work of other authors. Many of the books were illustrated by prominent illustrators of the day, including John Hassall and Frank Reynolds. During World War I he also produced a number of works in support of the war effort.

- The Chicot Papers (1901) Collection of pieces published previously in the Sketch
- Love and a Cottage (1903)
- The God in the Garden (1904)
- Love in June (1905)
- The Smiths of Surbiton (1906) Published in USA as The Smiths: a comedy without a plot
- The Whip Hand (1906)
- The Bachelor Girls (1907)
- Miss Charity (1908)
- The Smiths of Valley View (1909)
- Potted Brains (1909)
- The Cheerful Knave (1910)
- The Happy Vanners (1911)
- Chicot in America (1911) Howard's travels in Canada & USA
- One of the Family (1911)
- Lord London (1913) Based on career of Lord Northcliffe
- Merry-Andrew (1915)
- Forked Lightning (1916)
- Chin Music (1917)
- The Gay Life (1917)
- The Smiths in War-Time (1918)
- The Adorable Lad (1918)
- The Zeebrugge Affair (1918) Account of the Zeebrugge Raid
- The Comedy of It (1919)
- Take One at Night (1919)
- An Author in Wonderland (1919) Howard's wartime encounters
- The Peculiar Major (1919)
- Puck and Mr Purley (1920)
- The Purleys of Wimbledon (1922)
- King of the Castle (1922)
- The Fast Lady (1925)
- Chicot Calling (1925)
- The Chicot Club (1926)
- Paradise Island (1926)
- Lord Babs (1927)
- My Motley Life (1927) An autobiography
- The Fast Gentleman: A Tale of the Norfolk Broads (1928)

== Plays ==
These included both full-length plays and shorter one act dramas intended to be performed as curtain raisers to other works. Between 1923 and 2000 a number were adapted for radio and broadcast by the BBC.

- Compromising Martha (1906)
- All Through Martha (1906) Combines all the 'Martha' plays
- Martha Plays the Fairy (1907)
- Charles, his Friend (1907)
- The Dramatist at Home (1909)
- Come Michaelmas (1909)
- The Girl Who Could Not Lie (1911)
- The Embarrassed Butler (1912)
- Dropping the Pilot (1913) Original title: The Whip Hand.
- The Cheerful Knave (1914)
- The Green Flag (1915) Original title: Forked Lightning.
- The Test Kiss (1918)
- Lazy Lubin (in America) (1920)
- Sweet William (1921)
- The Smiths of Surbiton (1922)
- Puss in the Corner (1923)
- An Order to View (1923)
- All in Train (1924)
- Lord Babs (1925)

== Film adaptations ==
A number of films have been made based on the novels and plays of Keble Howard.

- The God in the Garden (1921)
- Miss Charity (1921)
- King of the Castle (1926)
- Lord Babs (1932)
- The Fast Lady (1963)
