= Wanted, a Boy =

1924 film

- Directed by: Thomas Bentley
- Written by: W. Pett Ridge; Eliot Stannard
- Produced by: Edward Godal
- Starring: Sydney Fairbrother; Lionelle Howard; Pauline Johnson
- Production companies: British & Colonial Kinematograph Company
- Distributed by: Ideal
- Release date: 1924
- Country: United Kingdom
- Language: English

Wanted, a Boy is a 1924 British silent comedy film directed by Thomas Bentley and starring Sydney Fairbrother, Lionelle Howard and Pauline Johnson. It was made by British & Colonial Kinematograph Company at the company's Walthamstow Studios.

== Cast ==
- Sydney Fairbrother as The Aunt
- Lionelle Howard as The Suitor
- Pauline Johnson as The Niece

== Bibliography ==
- Low, Rachael. History of the British Film, 1918-1929. George Allen & Unwin, 1971.
