= Pauline Johnson (actress) =

English film actress (1899–1947)

Pauline Johnson (3 November 1899 – 13 February 1947) was an English film actress. She was a leading lady of British films during the silent era.

She was born Katherine Johnson in Newcastle upon Tyne, Northumberland, England and died in Dorset, England in 1947.

== Partial filmography ==
- The Imperfect Lover (1921)
- Blanchette (1921)
- Class and No Class (1921)
- A Sailor Tramp (1922)
- Wanted, a Boy (1924)
- One of the Best (1927)
- The Hellcat (1928)
- What Next? (1928)
- The Flying Scotsman (1929)
- The Wrecker (1929)
- Wait and See (1929)
- Little Miss London (1929)
- Would You Believe It! (1929)
