= Santiago de Espada =

Concert overture by Malcolm Williamson

See Order of Saint James of the Sword for the eponymous order.

Santiago de Espada is a concert overture by the Australian composer Malcolm Williamson.

== History of the Work ==
Written in 1956, when Williamson was barely 25, it was his first mature orchestral work. The overture was first heard in June 1957, when the London Philharmonic Orchestra conducted by Sir Adrian Boult included it in a private concert at St. Pancras Town Hall, London (an event which also featured the première of Williamson's Symphony No. 1 Elevamini). Despite this, it wasn't until a broadcast in February 1958 that the work had its first public airing.

The overture was not performed in Australia until 1970. It has since been taken up by orchestras (both professional and amateur) across the globe, particularly in Australia and Britain.

== Structure ==
This relatively early Williamson score begins with bright, martial fanfares in the brass and percussion supported by occasional interjections from the rest of the orchestra. Soon, the strings take up the fanfare and turn it into a more lengthy 'first subject'. A more lyrical utterance appears from the oboe and flute respectively, before the original material returns. The 'second subject' is a gently solemn melody for flute and strings, which builds to a regal climax before the original theme returns with a vengeance. The 'second subject' is heard again over a spiky and agitated accompaniment, before the two themes are combined in close counterpoint. At the conclusion of the piece the original fanfares are heard once more before the overture grinds to a halt with an upward chromatic scale for the whole orchestra.

== Instrumentation ==
Flute, piccolo, 2 oboes, 2 clarinets, 2 bassoons, 4 horns, 2 trumpets, 3 trombones, tuba, timpani, 2 percussion (clash cymbals, snare drum & tenor drum) and strings.

== Recordings ==
- CHANDOS: Iceland Symphony Orchestra, conducted by Rumon Gamba
- LYRITA: Royal Liverpool Philharmonic Orchestra, conducted by Sir Charles Groves
- ABC Classics: Tasmanian Symphony Orchestra, conducted by Richard Mills
