= Symphony No. 1 (Williamson) =

The Symphony No. 1 Elevamini is an orchestral work by Australian-born composer Malcolm Williamson.

== History of the Work ==
Williamson's Symphony No. 1 (Elevamini) was written in 1956 and the early part of 1957, when he was barely 25 years of age. Considering this, the work has remarkable technical and structural assurance, and a profound emotional core which is quite astonishing coming from young composer so early on in his career. Sir Adrian Boult saw the score of the symphony soon after its completion in 1957, and these traits were clearly evident to him as the symphony made such an impression upon the great conductor that he decided to give the work a private performance later that year with the London Philharmonic Orchestra in St. Pancras Town Hall, London. This concert also included the first performance of Williamson's sparkling concert overture Santiago de Espada with the same forces. The symphony was officially premièred in Melbourne, Australia in November 1963 by the Melbourne Symphony Orchestra conducted by Sir Bernard Heinze (in 1982, Williamson wrote the orchestral work In Thanksgiving - Sir Bernard Heinze, which was written shortly after hearing of Heinze's death. It was premièred in Sydney later that year). After this performance, the symphony was rarely heard until 1977 when Sir Charles Groves performed and recorded the piece with the Royal Liverpool Philharmonic Orchestra. Although the symphony has since had few performances, they are gradually mounting as the profile of both the symphony and the composer begins to gain height.

== Orchestration ==
2 flutes (2nd doubling piccolo), 2 oboes (2nd doubling cor anglais), 2 clarinets (2nd doubling bass clarinet), 2 bassoons (2nd doubling contrabassoon), 4 horns, 3 trumpets, 3 trombones, tuba, timpani, percussion (gong, clash cymbals, suspended cymbal, triangle, 3 woodblocks, bass drum, snare drum & tenor drum), and strings.

== Notes on the Symphony ==
Williamson had recently moved to London from Sydney, Australia when he wrote Elevamini, and had quickly become close friends with many of the leading musicians and composers of the day, such as Benjamin Britten, Richard Rodney Bennett, Sir Adrian Boult, Elisabeth Lutyens, Erwin Stein and Yehudi Menuhin. This new 'orbit' of musical friends exposed him to a whole new world of music of which he had previously been ignorant. It was during these early years that Williamson discovered the music of composers which were to become his biggest influences; musical traits of composers such as Igor Stravinsky, Arnold Schoenberg, Béla Bartók and others are clearly evident in some of his early works. However, it was the music of Olivier Messiaen that made a lasting impression on Williamson, and this is evident from his very early works, such as the Variations for Piano of 1954 and the Piano Sonata No. 1, through to the much later works, such as the Symphony No. 6 (A Liturgy of Homage) of 1982 and the song-cycle of 1995, A Year of Birds. Indeed, the Symphony No. 1 (Elevamini) has many detectable homages to Messiaen and Stravinsky incorporated within Williamson's very personal musical language.

The symphony itself it built around a tone-row (indicating Schoenberg's influence), consisting of the notes A♭, G, B♭, E♭, F, F♯, C, and D. From this tone-row, most of the symphony's material is derived in some way or another, such as the dissonant opening chords or the 'trio' section in the middle movement, scherzo.

== Structure ==
The symphony is broken up into three separate movements, as follows:

1. Lento – Poco più mosso – Lo stesso tempo ma liberamente – Largo marziale – Tempo 1 – Andante lento – Tempo 1
2. Allegretto – Poco più mosso – Tempo 1
3. Lento assai – Allegro – Andante lento – Allegro come prima – Lento assai – Allegro

== Recordings ==
- CHANDOS: Iceland Symphony Orchestra, conducted by Rumon Gamba
- LYRITA: Royal Liverpool Philharmonic Orchestra, conducted by Sir Charles Groves
