= Der Hexer (1964 film) =

1964 film

- Directed by: Alfred Vohrer
- Written by: Herbert Reinecker; Harald G. Petersson; based on a novel by Edgar Wallace
- Produced by: Horst Wendlandt
- Starring: Joachim Fuchsberger; Heinz Drache
- Cinematography: Karl Löb
- Edited by: Jutta Hering
- Music by: Peter Thomas
- Production company: Rialto Film
- Distributed by: Constantin Film
- Release date: 21 August 1964
- Running time: 85 minutes
- Country: West Germany
- Language: German

Der Hexer (aka The Ringer, The Wizard or The Mysterious Magician) is a 1964 West German black-and-white mystery film directed by Alfred Vohrer and starring Joachim Fuchsberger. It was part of a very successful series of German films based on the writings of Edgar Wallace and adapted from the 1925 novel titled The Ringer (originally: The Gaunt Stranger). In 1965, a sequel Neues vom Hexer (Again the Ringer) was released.

== Plot ==
Gwenda Milton, the secretary of the lawyer Messer, is found dead in the Thames. What looks like an accident turns out to be murder. The autopsy shows that she did not drown, but was strangled, with Messer's men behind the operation.

She was the sister of Arthur Milton, the so-called "Hexer" (Witcher). He had forced some crooks to commit suicide, which is why he was expelled from England and has been living in Australia ever since.

Higgins is given an anonymous tip to meet at an abandoned house to information about the murder. It is booby trapped with explosives, blown up by Messer's henchmen as he arrives. He narrowly escapes with his life.

The murder of Gwenda not only calls Scotland Yard to the scene, but also the Hexer, who is unlikely to leave the murder of his sister unpunished. The gang receive a letter on which their names are written stating that they are sentenced to death.

Sir John and Inspector Higgins of Scotland Yard are faced with the difficult task of finding Gwenda Milton's murderer before the Hexer punishes the perpetrators. Inspector Higgins is pleased that retired Scotland Yard Inspector Warren, who is the only one to have seen the Hexer, reports to Sir John and offers his help with the hunt.

An agent appears at their house but runs away when they sense him and chase after him.

The Hexer is a master of camouflage and knows how to change his appearance. The police suspect that he himself has arrived in London with his wife, Cora Ann Milton. An Australian crime reporter named James W. Wesby has entered the country at the same time as her.

Warren, Higgins and his romantic partner, Elise, are chased by a sewer system using attack dogs. Later, at a restaurant, their bill is paid and snakes have been planted inside their coats by the gang.

Scotland Yard uncovers a human trafficking operation targeting young women that the lawyer Messer runs with three accomplices. The alleged crime reporter Wesby is surprisingly well informed and first saves Elise, Higgins' girlfriend, and then Higgins himself from Messer's gang.

The first of the death sentence list is shot in self-defense during Higgins' freeing of Wesby. Warren tries to arrest Wesby as the Hexer, but he manages to escape.

Messer gets rid of his remaining accomplices and now feels safe enough to ask the police for protection from the Hexer. Higgins and Warren deduce that Gwenda Milton was killed in order to prevent her from coming across information that would incriminate her boss in a criminal conspiracy. They confront him at his house, and suddenly the lights go out and a scream is heard. When the lights comer back on, Messer is found murdered.

Wesby appears through a hidden door, who reveals himself to be an inspector of the Australian police. The Warren who was helping Higgins was secretly the Hexer, wearing a realistic face mask. The butler was Hexer's secretary. With the help of his wife Cora, however, the Hexer later manages to escape to Australia.

== Cast ==
- Joachim Fuchsberger as Inspector Higgins
- Heinz Drache as James Wesby
- Margot Trooger as Cora Ann Milton
- René Deltgen as Arthur Milton
- Eddi Arent as Finch
- Siegfried Lowitz as Warren
- Siegfried Schürenberg as Sir John Archibald
- Sophie Hardy as Elise
- Jochen Brockmann as Maurice Messer
- Kurt Waitzmann as Reddingwood
- Karl Lange as Reverend Hopkins
- Karl John as Shelby
- Anneli Sauli as Jean
- Hilde Sessak as wardress
- Petra von der Linde as Gwenda Milton
- Tilo von Berlepsch as receptionist
- Inge Keck as flower girl
- Wilhelm Vorwerg as parson
- Josef Wolff as waiter

== Production ==
The film was adapted from the 1925 novel by Edgar Wallace titled The Ringer (originally: The Gaunt Stranger). An earlier German version had been made in the Weimar Republic in 1932, also called Der Hexer.

Shooting took place from 3 June to 10 July 1964 on location in Hamburg and at the Spandau Studios in Berlin.

== Release ==
The FSK gave the film a rating of 16 and up and found it not appropriate for screenings on public holidays.

It premiered on 21 August 1964 at the Alhambra in Düsseldorf.

== Parody ==
The title of the 2004 German comedy film Der Wixxer is a parody of and wordplay on Der Hexer. It parodies German media in general (akin to the Scary Movie series), but puts particular emphasis on parodying the German Edgar Wallace productions of the 1960s and 1970s. Whereas "Der Hexer" translates to witcher or warlock in English, "Der Wixxer" is an intentional misspelling of "der Wichser", a vulgar derogatory term meaning "the wanker".

== Other film versions of the novel ==
- The Ringer (1928)
- The Ringer (1931)
- The Ringer (Der Hexer, 1932)
- The Gaunt Stranger (1938)
- The Ringer (1952)
