= Isabel Priestley =

British journalist and socialist activist

Isabel Emma Priestley (died 28 July 1927) was a British journalist and socialist activist.

Priestley was the daughter of Major Arthur Gore Priestley and Emma née Righy.

Priestley worked for the Review of Reviews in the early 1890s, then from 1892 for the Fabian Society in 1892. In 1893, she also joined the Fabians as a member and, although she moved to work for The Sun in 1895, she served on the executive of the Fabian Society from 1896 until 1898.

In October 1897, Priestley married Bart Kennedy.
