= Organ Concerto (Williamson) =

Orchestral work by Malcom Williamson

The Organ Concerto is an orchestral work by Malcolm Williamson.

== History ==
Williamson's Organ Concerto was written in 1961, to a commission from Sir William Glock specifically for that year's BBC Proms season. The première took place at the Royal Albert Hall, London, on 8 August, and was performed by the London Philharmonic Orchestra under Sir Adrian Boult (a staunch advocate of Williamson's music) with the composer himself as soloist.

Stylistically, the work is jagged, dissonant (though with moments of uninhibited tonality) and often wildly percussive, which is a marked contrast to much of the other works on which Williamson was working at the time, such as the ever-popular choral works Procession of Psalms and Agnus Dei, the picturesque Travel Diaries for piano solo, and the grand Piano Concerto No. 3 (completed a year later, in 1962). Many listeners at the time were bewildered by the (allegedly) bizarre sound-world of the concerto, and there were mixed reviews from the press. The Daily Mail had the headline: "This won't do, Mr. Williamson!". Williamson himself later recalled that "the concerto's first performance was received with enthusiastic abuse by the more conservative elements of the British organ world for being too venturesome, by Baroque enthusiasts for its use of the romantic organ, and by some critics for not being sufficiently venturesome!" However, subsequent performances have shown it to be one of Williamson's best works, and is held in high regard by many.

== Structure ==
The concerto is divided into three movements, as follows:

1. Andante quasi recitativo – Allegro
2. Largo sostenuto
3. Cadenza – Allegro

== Recordings ==
LYRITA: London Philharmonic, Adrian Boult (conductor) and Malcolm Williamson (organ solo) [SRCD.280]
