= Sidney Gilliat =

British film director, producer and screenwriter (1908–1994)

- Born: 15 February 1908; Edgeley, Stockport, Cheshire, England
- Died: 31 May 1994 (aged 86); Wiltshire, England
- Occupations: Film director; producer; writer
- Spouse: Beryl Brewer (m. 1933; died 1981)
- Children: 2
- Relatives: Amanda Eliasch (granddaughter)

Sidney Gilliat (15 February 1908 – 31 May 1994) was an English film director, producer and screenwriter.

In the 1930s he worked as a scriptwriter, most notably with Frank Launder on The Lady Vanishes (1938) for Alfred Hitchcock, and Night Train to Munich (1940), directed by Carol Reed. He and Launder made their directorial debut co-directing the home front drama Millions Like Us (1943). From 1945 he also worked as a producer, starting with The Rake's Progress, which he also wrote and directed. He and Launder made over 40 films together, founding their own production company Individual Pictures. While Launder concentrated on directing their comedies, most famously the four St Trinian's School films, Gilliat showed a preference for comedy-thrillers and dramas, including Green for Danger (1946), London Belongs to Me (1948) and State Secret (1950).

He wrote the libretto for Malcolm Williamson's opera Our Man in Havana, based on the novel by Graham Greene. He had also worked on the film.

== Early life and career ==
Gilliat was born in the district of Edgeley in Stockport, Cheshire, and was the son of George Gilliat, the editor of the London Evening Standard from 1928 to 1933. He was brought up in New Malden and educated at London University, studying English and History. He worked for a period as a journalist at the Evening Standard, later saying he was fired after refusing to interview a grieving widow who was too upset to be spoken to.

The film critic of the Evening Standard, Walter Mycroft, went to work at Elstree Studios as a scenario editor, and hired Gilliat to write intertitles for silent films. He was fired after he was overheard criticising a producer's work.

=== Walter Forde ===
Gilliat's early screen credits were on films directed by Walter Forde including Red Pearls (1930), Lord Richard in the Pantry (1930), Bed and Breakfast (1930), You'd Be Surprised! (1930), The Ghost Train (1931), The Ringer (1931) and Third Time Lucky (1931). He also wrote The Happy Ending (1931) and A Gentleman of Paris (1931).

Gillat's first major credit as a screenwriter was Rome Express (1932) directed by Forde. He and Frank Launder worked on the script for Facing the Music (1933) but they did not actually work together.

Gilliat was credited as writer on Friday the Thirteenth (1933); Orders Is Orders (1933); Falling for You (1933) with Jack Hulbert; Jack Ahoy (1934) with Hulbert; Chu Chin Chow (1934); Bulldog Jack (1935) with Hulbert; My Heart Is Calling (1935); and Strangers on Honeymoon (1936).

He worked on a Will Hay film, Where There's a Will (1936), and a horror film The Man Who Changed His Mind (1936). These were written for producer Ted Black who became a champion of Gilliat's.

=== Frank Launder ===
Gilliat's first movie with Launder was Twelve Good Men (1936). They also collaborated on Seven Sinners (1936).

Without Launder he did Take My Tip (1937) for Hulbert; A Yank at Oxford (1938) for MGM; Strange Boarders (1938); and The Gaunt Stranger (1938) with Sonnie Hale. Gilliat and Launder collaborated on The Lady Vanishes (1938).

Gilliat wrote another for Hay, Ask a Policeman (1939), and was one of several writers on Hitchcock's Jamaica Inn (1939). With Launder he did Inspector Hornleigh on Holiday (1939) and Night Train to Munich (1940), the latter for Carol Reed. For Reed Gilliat wrote on his own a thriller Girl in the News (1940). Gilliat began writing war time shorts such as Mr. Proudfoot Shows a Light (1941).

He and Launder worked on They Came by Night (1940), and Reed's The Young Mr. Pitt (1942). Alone, Gilliat adapted Kipps (1941) for Reed.

== Producers/directors ==
Launder and Gilliat wanted to become producers and directors. Their first effort as co-directors was a short, Partners in Crime (1942). Then they made the feature Millions Like Us (1943) which was a success, launching them as producers and directors.

According to an obituary of Gilliat:

Gilliat and Launder made an unlikely pair, both physically and temperamentally Launder spare, dark and easily excited, Gilliat stockier and with the sort of down-to-earth, practical nature which provided a solid basis for their working partnership. Gilliat, in fact, always deprecated his own comic talents, claiming that it was Launder who wrote all the jokes, though this was a huge overstatement. But certainly they did their best work together. Their speciality was the thriller-comedy. As writers, their scripts were noted for clever plotting and shrewd observation of the foibles of the English character. As directors, Gilliat tended to favour quieter satire, where Launder excelled in broader farce. But it was difficult generally to know where the contribution of one ended and the other began, even though officially they liked to take it in turn to act on each film as scriptwriter and director.

Gilliat helped write Two Thousand Women (1944) which Launder directed. Without Launder, Gilliat wrote and directed Waterloo Road (1945) with John Mills and Stewart Granger. But normally both men would produce and write the script and take turns directing.

Gilliat directed The Rake's Progress (1945) with Rex Harrison; Green for Danger (1946); and London Belongs to Me (1948). Launder directed I See a Dark Stranger (1946), Captain Boycott (1947), The Blue Lagoon (1949) and The Happiest Days of Your Life (1950).

Gilliat directed the thriller State Secret (1950) while Launder did Lady Godiva Rides Again (1951) and Folly to Be Wise (1953). Around this time they announced a film about Dunkirk and a science fiction story but neither was made.

Instead Gilliat directed The Story of Gilbert and Sullivan (1953), then Launder did The Belles of St. Trinian's (1954). The film starred George Cole who later said working for the team meant "good scripts but terrible money. If Alastair was in the film it was even worse because he got most of it. But they were wonderful people to work with."

Gilliat did The Constant Husband (1955) with Rex Harrison followed by Launder's Geordie (1955).

They wrote and produced, but did not direct The Green Man (1956) and produced The Smallest Show on Earth (1957). Gilliat directed Fortune Is a Woman (1957), a thriller with Jack Hawkins while Launder did Blue Murder at St Trinian's (1957) and The Bridal Path (1959).

=== British Lion ===
In 1958, they joined the board of British Lion. Gilliat directed Left Right and Centre (1959), a political satire after which Launder did The Pure Hell of St Trinian's (1960). Gilliat had a big hit with Only Two Can Play (1962), which he directed. He produced Joey Boy (1965), and then both men directed The Great St Trinian's Train Robbery (1966).

They worked on a script, Sex and the British, for two years but had to abandon it when British divorce laws made the concept obsolete. Instead they made Endless Night (1972) which Gilliat directed. He and Launder produced Ooh… You Are Awful (1972).

== Personal life ==
Gilliat married Beryl Brewer (1910–1981) in 1933. He had two children: Joanna and Caroline Gilliat, and three grandchildren.

Sidney Gilliat died in at his home in Wiltshire, England on 31 May 1994 aged 86. His brother was the producer Leslie Gilliat who worked with him. His obituary in The Times described his and Frank Launder's collaboration as 'one of the most sparkling writing, directing and producing partnerships in postwar British cinema.'

== Appraisal ==
According to one obituary "if wanted to give new generations, or foreigners, some idea of the way the British were in the thirties and forties, one could do no better than show them the films with which Sidney Gilliat was connected... [He] had unfailing good humour, and an unerring feeling for time, place and character. These were most noticeable in the comedy-thrillers, in which the realistic treatment disguised far-fetched plots.

Another one said "Of all the tireless toilers in the ungrateful vineyards of British cinema comedy (Roy and John Boulting, Ralph and Gerald Thomas, Muriel and Sydney Box), Launder and Gilliat were least in thrall to the insatiable jokiness of the breadwinning professional humorist, and their long collaboration has left us with a memory of unfailing good-humour and an occasional brainy prankishness."

== Selected films ==
- Would You Believe It! (1929) (actor)
- Red Pearls (1930) (writer)
- You'd Be Surprised! (1930) (writer)
- The Ringer (1931) (writer)
- The Happy Ending (1931) (writer)
- Third Time Lucky (1931) (writer)
- A Gentleman of Paris (1931) (writer)
- Rome Express (1932) (writer)
- Facing the Music (1933) (writer)
- My Heart Is Calling (1935) writer
- The Man Who Changed His Mind (1936) (writer)
- Twelve Good Men (1936)
- Seven Sinners (1936) (writer)
- Take My Tip (1937) (writer)
- A Yank at Oxford (1938) (writer)
- The Lady Vanishes (1938) (writer)
- Strange Boarders (1938) (writer)
- The Gaunt Stranger (1938) (writer)
- Ask a Policeman (1938) (story)
- Jamaica Inn (1939) (writer)
- Night Train to Munich (1940) (writer)
- They Came by Night (1940) (writer)
- Mr. Proudfoot Shows a Light (1941) (writer)
- The Young Mr. Pitt (1942) (writer)
- Partners in Crime (1942) (co-director/co-writer)
- Millions Like Us (1943) (director)
- Waterloo Road (1944) (director/co-writer)
- Two Thousand Women (1944) (co-writer)
- The Rake's Progress (1945) (director/producer)
- I See a Dark Stranger (1946) (producer)
- Green for Danger (1946) (director/producer)
- London Belongs to Me (1948) (director/co-writer)
- State Secret (1950) (director)
- The Story of Gilbert and Sullivan (1953) (director/producer/writer)
- The Belles of St. Trinian's (1954) (producer)
- The Constant Husband (1955) (director/producer/co-writer)
- Geordie (1955) (producer)
- Fortune Is a Woman (1956) (director)
- The Green Man (1956) (producer)
- Blue Murder at St Trinian's (1957) (producer)
- Left, Right and Centre (1959) (director)
- The Bridal Path (1959) (producer)
- The Pure Hell of St Trinian's (1960) (producer)
- Only Two Can Play (1962) (director/producer)
- The Great St Trinian's Train Robbery (1966) (co-director/producer)
- Endless Night (1972) (director/producer)

== See also ==
- Charters and Caldicott
