= The Gaunt Stranger =

- British poster for The Gaunt Stranger
- Directed by: Walter Forde
- Screenplay by: Sidney Gilliat
- Based on: The Ringer by Edgar Wallace
- Produced by: Michael Balcon
- Starring: Sonnie Hale; Wilfrid Lawson; Louise Henry; Alexander Knox
- Cinematography: Ronald Neame
- Edited by: Charles Saunders
- Music by: Ernest Irving
- Production company: Ealing Studios
- Distributed by: ABFD (UK)
- Release date: 10 January 1939 (UK)
- Running time: 74 minutes
- Country: United Kingdom
- Language: English
- Budget: £18,022

The Gaunt Stranger (U.S. title: The Phantom Strikes) is a 1938 British mystery thriller film directed by Walter Forde and starring Sonnie Hale, Wilfrid Lawson and Alexander Knox. It was written by Sidney Gilliat based on the 1929 play The Ringer by Edgar Wallace.

== Plot ==
A notorious killer, long believed to have died in Australia, returns to England seeking revenge for the death of his sister. The "Ringer" threatens to murder the criminal mastermind Maurice Meister. Detective Inspector Alan Wembury is assigned to the case and, despite his strong dislike for Meister, attempts to protect him with the reluctant assistance of another criminal, Sam Hackett, who has been released from prison as he is the only man able to identify the "Ringer". Even with his help, Wembury struggles to unmask their target before the time at which Meister is due to be killed.

== Cast ==
- Sonnie Hale as Samuel Cuthbert "Sam" Hackett
- Wilfrid Lawson as Maurice Meister
- Louise Henry as Cora Ann Milton
- Alexander Knox as Dr Lomond
- Peter Croft as John Lenley
- George Merritt as Police Station Sergeant
- Patrick Barr as Det. Insp. Alan Wembury
- John Longden as Inspector Bliss
- Patricia Roc as Mary Lenley
- Arthur Hambling as Detective Sergeant Richards
- Charles Eaton as Colonel Walford

== Production ==
Michael Balcon had left his position as head of MGM-British and decided to go into independent production in association with director Walter Forde. For their first film they decided to make a movie based on the 1925 novel The Gaunt Stranger by Edgar Wallace, which had been renamed The Ringer in 1926, and which Forde had previously adapted as The Ringer in 1931. Balcon said they chose the novel "because Forde was as good at thrillers as comedy (he had made The Ghost Train and Rome Express) and, in any case, there were always comedy opportunities in Edgar Wallace stories." Reg Baker of Ealing Studios suggested Balcon come over to replace Basil Dean as head of production, and made The Gaunt Stranger there – thus it became the first movie made at Ealing under Balcon as head of production.

== Release ==
The film was screened by the censors on 4 October 1938, but did not premier until 10 January 1939, when it opened at Gaumont Haymarket as second film in a double bill with The Cowboy and the Lady. It was, however, popular enough for a British re-release in 1945.

Balcon claims the film was profitable.

== Reception ==
The Monthly Film Bulletin wrote: "It is a good picture, ably directed, well acted, and worth its celluloid. Sonnie Hale, as the nervous butler, heroically provides the comedy relief in the homicidal atmosphere of Meister's house. As the suave and sinister Meister, Wilfrid Lawson succeeds in conveying all the horror and drabness of the part. The suspense is well sustained and subtly increases in dramatic intensity, with the time factor and Meister's panic as his end approaches compellingly interwoven."

Kine Weekly wrote: "There is considerably more talk than action, but so competent is the direction, good the character drawing, and neat and exciting the climax, that slick, thrill-provoking entertainment accompanies the greater part of the eventual story development. When all is said and done, it is good Edgar Wallace, and the author's name is, it must be remembered, still one to conjure with."

== See also ==
- The Ringer (1928)
- The Ringer (1931)
- The Ringer (1932)
- The Ringer (1952)
- Der Hexer (1964)
