= Arthur Pusey =

British actor (1896–1965)

Arthur Pusey (July 1896 – 1965) was a British stage and film actor.

He was born in Watford, Hertfordshire, and died in London.

== Selected filmography ==
- The Barton Mystery (1920)
- The Bachelor's Club (1921)
- The Other Person (1921)
- The God in the Garden (1921)
- Stable Companions (1922)
- The Lonely Lady of Grosvenor Square (1922)
- The Blue Lagoon (1923)
- Moonbeam Magic (1924)
- Father Voss (1925)
- Land of Hope and Glory (1927)
- Weib in Flammen (1928)
- The Woman on the Rack (1928)
- Baccarat (Souris d'hôtel, 1929)
- The Silent House (1929)
- Die vierte von rechts (1929)
- The Fourth from the Right (1929)
- To What Red Hell (1929)
- Red Pearls (1930)

== Bibliography ==
- Jung, Uli & Schatzberg, Walter. Beyond Caligari: The Films of Robert Wiene. Berghahn Books, 1999.
