= You'd Be Surprised! =

1930 film

- Film-story tie-in, Boy's Cinema (23 August, 1930))
- Directed by: Walter Forde
- Written by: Walter Forde; Harry Fowler Mear; Sidney Gilliat
- Produced by: Archibald Nettlefold
- Starring: Walter Forde; Joy Windsor; Frank Perfitt; Frank Stanmore
- Cinematography: Geoffrey Faithfull
- Edited by: Walter Forde
- Music by: Paul Mulder
- Production company: Nettlefold Films
- Distributed by: Butcher's Film Service
- Release date: April 1930
- Running time: 66 minutes
- Country: United Kingdom
- Language: English

You'd Be Surprised! is a 1930 British musical comedy film directed by Walter Forde and starring Forde, Joy Windsor and Frank Stanmore. It was written by Forde, Harry Fowler Mear and Sidney Gilliat, and was shot at the Nettlefold Studios in Walton, during the transition to sound film. Originally silent, it had synchronised songs and music added. A silent version was also released to cater to cinemas that had not yet converted to sound.

== Premise ==
After dressing up as a prisoner for a fancy dress party, a songwriter is mistaken for a notorious escaped convict and sent to prison.

== Cast ==
- Walter Forde as Walter
- Joy Windsor as Maisie Vane
- Frank Stanmore as Frankie
- Frank Perfitt as Major
- Douglas Payne as Convict 99

== Critical reception ==
Kine Weekly wrote: "While Forde's latest comedy production does not measure up to his previous picture, it has ingenious ideas for stunts that contain novelty value. There is a theme song that will prove popular, and the star's proven popularity helps considerably. ... Walter Forde not only plays in the picture, but he alsocdirected it and wrote the theme song. It says a lot for his versatility."

Variety wrote: "Got everything – story, first-rate comedy idea, good enough cast, plenty of gags; everything but a picture. It is hard to figure out why. There is a kind of amateur poverty about the finished article which is hard to define. It can be seen but scarcely put into words. Perhaps it was tightwad production management; perhaps it was spending the dough the wrong way. Anyhow, it's one of those things which you know could have been made a wow with, say, Lloyd, and in Hollywood, but which here almost fails to be anything but a pity.... Fair few gags good for laughs, especially Forde chained to a tough giant and dragged all around by him when escaping."
