= Lento for Strings =

Lento for Strings is an orchestral work by the Australian composer Malcolm Williamson.

== History of the work ==
The brief but eloquent Lento for Strings was written in 1985, while the composer was in Australia. The work was commissioned by the Royal Melbourne Philharmonic, who premièred it in the autumn of that year in Melbourne, and Williamson chose to dedicate the piece to a longtime friend and champion, Paul McDermott. McDermott was held in particularly high regard by Williamson, especially as it was he who had successfully conducted his Symphony No. 6: Liturgy of Homage a few years before.

== Structure ==
Firmly rooted in the key of F major, the stately theme is first played by the violins. After a short development section, the key changes to the relative major (D major, in this case) in a grand restatement of the original theme. The music returns to the opening key for the coda, where echoes of the theme are heard in the violas, with the slight harmonic alteration of the flatted sixth of the scale (D♭, in this case), a colouration which adds a certain poignancy to the final bars.

== Orchestration ==
The Lento is scored for orchestral strings only, playing divisi most of the time.

== Recordings ==
Recordings of the Lento available commercially include:

- CHANDOS: Iceland Symphony Orchestra conducted by Rumon Gamba. (CHAN 1046)
- CRESSIDIA CLASSICS: London Schubert Players, conducted by Alan Tongue. (CRES CD 196)
- CARLTON CLASSICS: English Northern Philharmonia conducted by Alan Simmons (Carlton 8843818)
