= The Rake's Progress (film) =

1945 British film by Sidney Gilliat

- British trade ad
- Directed by: Sidney Gilliat
- Written by: Frank Launder; Sidney Gilliat; Val Valentine (story)
- Produced by: Frank Launder; Sidney Gilliat
- Starring: Rex Harrison; Lilli Palmer
- Cinematography: Wilkie Cooper
- Edited by: Thelma Connell
- Music by: William Alwyn
- Production company: Independent Producers
- Distributed by: Eagle-Lion Distributors
- Release date: 6 December 1945 (London premiere)
- Running time: 120 minutes
- Country: United Kingdom
- Language: English
- Budget: $1,120,000
- Box office: over $1 million (US rentals)

The Rake's Progress (U.S. title Notorious Gentleman) is a 1945 British comedy-drama film directed by Sidney Gilliat and starring Rex Harrison and Lilli Palmer. It was written by Frank Launder, Gilliat and Val Valentine.

== Plot ==
The plot follows the career of upper-class cad Vivian Kenway. He is sent down from Oxford University for placing a chamber pot on the Martyrs' Memorial. Sent to South America after his father pulls a favour from a friend, he is fired for heckling the managing director while drunk.

A friend offers him a job, but he responds by seducing his wife and is found out. His jobs decline, as he moves from employment as racing driver to shop assistant to dancing partner. He lives a life of womanising and heavy drinking and constantly runs up large debts, which his family has to pay. One girl tries to kill herself. Driving while drunk and taking risks, he crashes and causes the death of his father, Colonel Kenway. Kenway is eaten up by guilt in consequence. Another girl tries to rescue him.

The plot diverges from the theme of the Rake's Progress paintings by having him redeem himself by a hero's death in World War II.

== Cast ==
- Rex Harrison as Vivian Kenway
- Lilli Palmer as Rikki Krausner
- Godfrey Tearle as Colonel Robert Kenway
- Griffith Jones as Sandy Duncan
- Margaret Johnston as Jennifer Calthrop
- Guy Middleton as Fogroy
- Jean Kent as Jill Duncan
- Patricia Laffan as Miss Fernandez
- Marie Lohr as Lady Parks
- Garry Marsh as Sir Hubert Parks
- David Horne as Sir John Brockley
- Alan Wheatley as Edwards
- Brefni O'Rorke as Bromhead
- John Salew as Burgess
- Charles Victor as Old Sweat
- Joan Hickson as Miss Parker
- Jack Melford as race team member (uncredited)

== Production ==
Sidney Gilliat says the idea for the film came entirely from Val Valentine: "he thought of it on the bus." He also says Harrison never suggested Lili Palmer for the female lead, which came from Frank Launder.

== Release ==
The film caused controversy with U.S. censors of the time, who trimmed scenes for what was considered graphic amoral and sexual content.

== Critical reception ==
The Monthly Film Bulletin wrote: "This smooth essay in sophisticated satire blunts its point by concessions to the romantic hero principle, in condoning the rake's mean weaknesses and granting the expiation of self-sacrificial death. But its script shows a lively imaginativeness, while thoughtful preparatory work in camera angling and inventive handling of the camera on the floor combine with concise editing to maintain speed without haste. With his usual polish, Harrison conveys the half-unconscious cynicism of the rake's selfishness and in a good supporting cast Griffith Jones and newcomer Margaret Johnston give notable minor portraits."

Kine Weekly wrote: "The story, with its crowded surface action, skilfully worked into a "headline " history of the recent years, is packed with rich, colourful and thoughtful entertainment. The hero's despairing attempt to make something of himself in South America and his gallant end in action are but thin coats of whitewash, yet they are sufficient to give a human touch to the composite and showmanlike portrait. Women will enjoy the film hugely, and so, for that matter, will all men."

The New York Times described the film as "an oddly deceptive affair which taxes precise classification. It plays like a comedy-romance, but all the way through it keeps switching with brutal abruptness to the sharpest irony ... As a consequence, a curious unevenness of emphasis and mood prevails, and initial sympathy with the hero is frequently and painfully upset."

TV Guide wrote, "the film is filled with wit and style. It does not treat its unattractive subject with sympathy, yet remains sensitive and touching."
