= The Ringer (1952 film) =

British mystery film by Guy Hamilton

- British theatrical poster
- Directed by: Guy Hamilton
- Screenplay by: Lesley Storm; Val Valentine
- Based on: The Ringer by Edgar Wallace
- Produced by: Hugh Perceval
- Starring: Herbert Lom; Donald Wolfit; Mai Zetterling
- Cinematography: Edward Scaife
- Edited by: Bert Bates
- Music by: Malcolm Arnold
- Production company: London Films
- Distributed by: British Lion Films
- Release date: December 1952 (London)
- Running time: 78 minutes
- Country: United Kingdom
- Language: English

The Ringer is a 1952 British mystery film directed by Guy Hamilton and starring Herbert Lom, Donald Wolfit, Mai Zetterling, Greta Gynt, William Hartnell, and Denholm Elliott. The screenplay was by Lesley Storm and Val Valentine. It was Hamilton's directorial debut and the third English-language sound version of Edgar Wallace's 1929 play based on his 1925 novel The Gaunt Stranger. The previous adaptations were in 1928 (silent), 1931, 1932 (Germany-Austria), and 1938.

== Plot ==
Maurice Meister, an underhand solicitor, receives threatening notes from a man known as "The Ringer" to all but his wife and Meister who know him as Henry Arthur Milton, a master of disguise. Milton's sister has been found drowned and he blames Meister for her death. Chief Inspector Bliss is put in charge of the case (having gone from New York back to Scotland Yard) to join Inspector Wembury of the Metropolitan Police in the Deptford territory.

Milton was thought to be dead in Australia but his wife arrives in London while bringing in news of the Ringer being alive. The police are called in to monitor him while Meister brings in a Cockney ex-burglar to serve as consultant in proofing the house. Complicating matters is the arrival of elderly Aberdonian criminologist Dr. Lomond and Meister's plan to take his secretary for himself rather than let her abscond with her fresh out of prison lover John Lemley, even preparing to leave with his British passport and her German identity card. The lady Milton arrives to warn Meister to leave London while Lomond arrives to observe the two.

Meister traps Lemley by giving him the keys to his office to look for a file before calling the police to entrap him on a burglary charge. Lemley, who figured out who played him, escapes his cell. However, Meister is electrocuted when he tries to get his air tickets from a tray with a wire on it. The police find an Australian whiskey and a gun on the bag of Lomond. The widow provides a distraction for the newly revealed Milton (who came across the real Lomond when in Australia and "borrowed" his credentials) as he runs upstairs to make his way for a new disguise, with the film ending on the widow being escorted away by him in a police car.

== Cast ==
- Herbert Lom as Maurice Meister
- Donald Wolfit as Dr. Lomond
- Mai Zetterling as Lisa
- Greta Gynt as Cora Ann Milton
- William Hartnell as Sam Hackett
- Denholm Elliott as John Lemley
- Norman Wooland as Inspector Bliss
- Dora Bryan as Mrs. Hackett
- Charles Victor as Inspector Wembury
- Walter Fitzgerald as commissioner
- John Stuart as gardener
- John Slater as Bell
- Edward Chapman as stranger
- Campbell Singer as Station Sergeant Carter
- Arthur Lovegrove as workman installing window bars (uncredited)
- Robert Raglan (uncredited)

== Production ==
The film was shot at Shepperton Studios near London. The film's sets were designed by the art director William Hutchinson.

== Critical reception ==
The Monthly Film Bulletin wrote: "Based on an Edgar Wallace story, this thriller has many of the faults of the most stereotyped British films. The settings and dialogue are theatrical and a good cast, notably the hard-working William Hartnell, can do little to bring the story to life."

Allmovie wrote, "Donald Wolfit, whose legendary thespic excesses were later fictionalized in the stage play The Dresser, is perfectly cast as a vengeance-seeking master of disguise".

TV Guide called it an "old-fashioned melodrama with an excellent cast."

In British Sound Films: The Studio Years 1928–1959 David Quinlan rated the film as "average", writing: "Good cast gets ancient thriller by."

== See also ==
- The Ringer (1928)
- The Ringer (1931)
- The Ringer (Der Hexer, 1932)
- The Gaunt Stranger (1938)
- Der Hexer (1964)
