= The Ringer (1932 film) =

Austrian-German mystery film

- DVD cover
- Directed by: Martin Frič; Karel Lamač
- Written by: Edgar Wallace (novel); Knut Borries; Gigotte Walter
- Produced by: Karel Lamač
- Starring: Paul Richter; Maria Matray; Wera Engels
- Cinematography: Otto Heller
- Edited by: Ella Ensink
- Music by: Jara Beneš; Artur Guttmann
- Production company: Ondra-Lamac-Film
- Distributed by: Süd-Film
- Release date: 22 July 1932
- Running time: 88 minutes
- Countries: Austria; Germany
- Language: German

The Ringer (German: Der Hexer) is a 1932 Austrian-German mystery film directed by Martin Frič and Karel Lamač and starring Paul Richter, Maria Matray and Wera Engels. It is a screen adaptation of Edgar Wallace's 1925 novel The Ringer. Another German version, Der Hexer, was made in 1964. It was shot at the Sievering Studios in Vienna. The film's sets were designed by the art director Heinz Fenchel.

== Synopsis ==
A master of disguise, the notorious "Ringer", has returned to London and is sending threatening messages to the criminal Maurice Meister. Inspector Wenbury of Scotland Yard endeavours to capture the elusive Ringer before he is able to murder Meister.

== Cast ==
- Paul Richter as Inspektor Wenbury
- Maria Matray as Mary Lenley
- Carl Walther Meyer as John Lenley
- Wera Engels as Cora Ann Milton
- Fritz Rasp as Maurice Meister
- Paul Henckels as Hauptinspektor Bliss
- Leopold Kramer as Polizeiarzt Dr. Lomond
- Karl Etlinger as Sam Hackitt
- Karl Forest as Oberst Walford
- Franz Schafheitlin as Wachtmeister Carter

== Production ==
It is Lamač's second adaptation from a novel by Wallace, after The Squeaker, the year before, both being the first sound film adaptations of Wallace books in German cinema.

== See also ==
- The Ringer (1928)
- The Ringer (1931)
- The Gaunt Stranger (1938)
- The Ringer (1952)
- Der Hexer (1964)

== Bibliography ==
- Bergfelder, Tim. International Adventures: German Popular Cinema and European Co-Productions in the 1960s. Berghahn Books, 2005.
