= Tramp =

Long-term homeless person

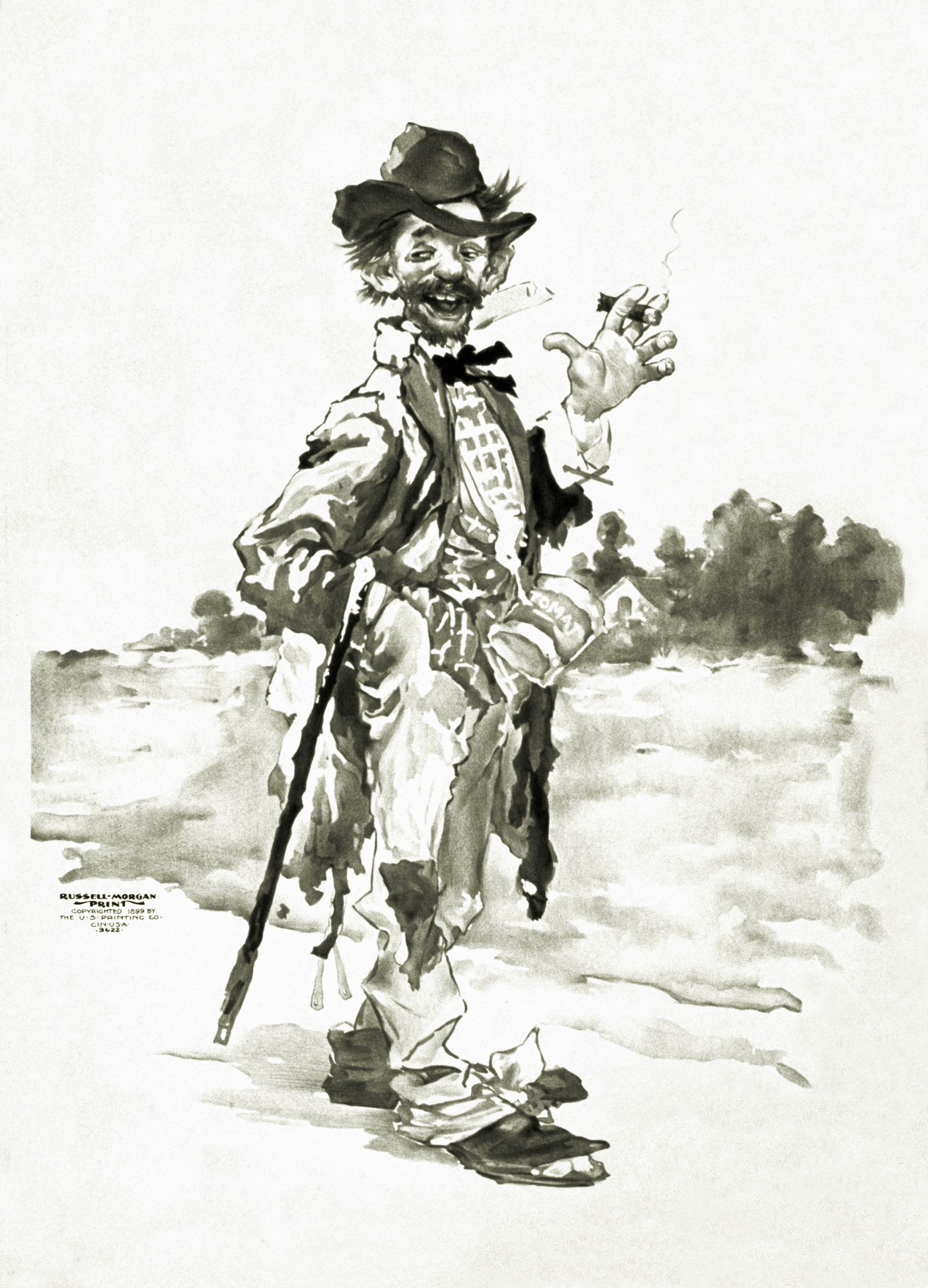
A romanticized tramp depicting Tom Lancaster

A tramp is a long-term homeless person who travels from place to place as a vagrant, traditionally walking all year round.

== Etymology ==
Tramp is derived from a Middle English verb meaning to "walk with heavy footsteps" (cf. modern English trample) and "to go hiking".

In Britain, the term was widely used to refer to vagrants in the early Victorian period. The social reporter Henry Mayhew refers to it in his writings of the 1840s and 1850s. By 1850, the word was well established. In that year, Mayhew described "the different kinds of vagrants or tramps" to be found in Britain, along with the "different trampers' houses in London or the country". He distinguished several types of tramps, ranging from young people fleeing from abusive families, through to people who made their living as wandering beggars and prostitutes.

In the United States, the word became frequently used during the American Civil War, to describe the widely shared experience of undertaking long marches, often with heavy packs. Use of the word as a noun is thought to have begun shortly after the war. A few veterans had developed a liking for the "call of the road". Others may have been too traumatised by war time experience to return to settled life.

== History ==
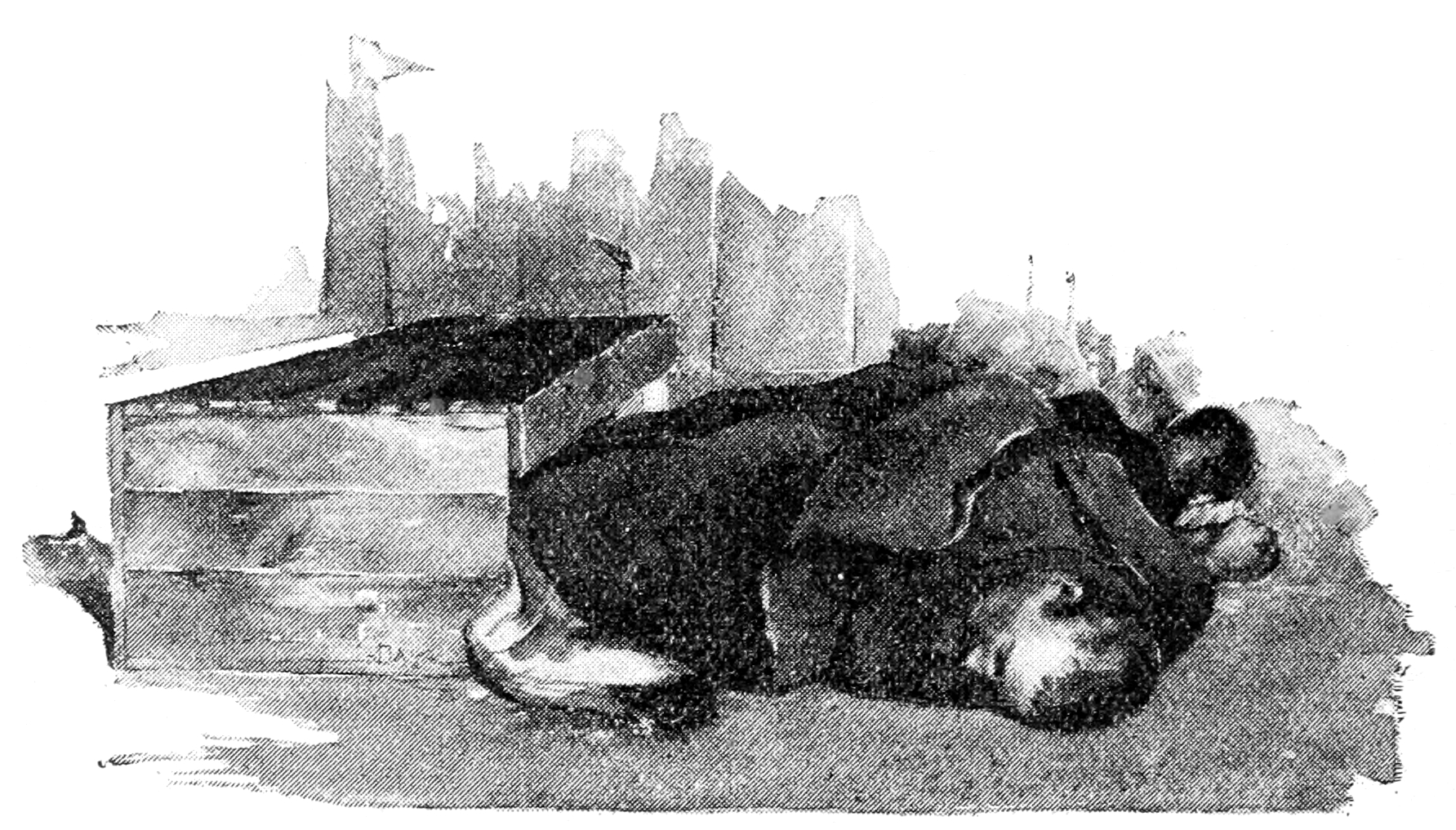
"A Tramp's Nest in Ludlow Street", How the Other Half Lives: Studies Among the Tenements of New York (1890), by Jacob Riis

Wanderers have existed since ancient times. The modern concept of the "tramp" emerges with the expansion of industrial towns in the early nineteenth century, with the consequent increase in migrant labor and pressure on housing. The common lodging house or "doss house" developed to accommodate transients. Urbanisation also led to an increase in forms of highly marginalized casual labor. Mayhew identifies the problem of "tramping" as a particular product of the economic crisis of the 1840s known as the Hungry Forties. John Burnett argues that in earlier periods of economic stability "tramping" involved a wandering existence, moving from job to job which was a cheap way of experiencing adventures beyond the "boredom and bondage of village life".

The number of transient homeless people increased markedly in the U.S. after the industrial recession of the early 1870s. Initially, the term "tramp" had a broad meaning, and was often used to refer to migrant workers who were looking for permanent work and lodgings. Later the term acquired a narrower meaning, to refer only to those who prefer the transient way of life. Writing in 1877 Allan Pinkerton said:

The tramp has always existed in some form or other, and he will continue on his wanderings until the end of time; but there is no question that he has come into public notice, particularly in America, to a greater extent during the present decade than ever before.

From 1896 to the last issue in 1953, the cover page of the British comic Illustrated Chips featured a comic strip of the tramps Weary Willie and Tired Tim, with its readers including a young Charlie Chaplin (who would become famous as the Tramp).

Author Bart Kennedy, a self-described tramp of 1900 America, once said "I listen to the tramp, tramp of my feet, and wonder where I was going, and why I was going." John Sutherland (1989) said that Kennedy "is one of the early advocates of 'tramping', as the source of literary inspiration."

The tramp became a character trope in vaudeville performance in the late 19th century in the United States. Lew Bloom claimed he was "the first stage tramp in the business".

== Meaning promiscuous woman ==
Perhaps because female tramps were often regarded as prostitutes, in the United States the term "tramp" also came to refer to a promiscuous woman. However, this is not a global usage. According to Australian linguist Kate Burridge, the term shifted towards this meaning in the 1920s, having previously predominantly referred to men, it followed the path of other similar gender neutral words (such as "slag") to having specific reference to female sexual laxity.

The word is also used, with ambiguous irony, in the classic 1937 Rodgers and Hart song "The Lady Is a Tramp", which is about a wealthy member of New York high society who chooses a vagabond life in "hobohemia". Other songs with implicit or explicit reference to this usage include "The Son of Hickory Holler's Tramp" and "Gypsys, Tramps & Thieves".

== Country specific definitions ==
The US State of Mississippi, until 2018, had a specific definition for "tramps", which was a criminal offense:

Any male person over 16 years of age, and not blind, who shall go about from place to place begging and asking subsistence by charity, and all who stroll over the country without lawful occasion, and can give no account of their conduct consistent with good citizenship, shall be held to be tramps. Every person, on conviction of being a tramp, shall be punished by a fine of not more than $50, or imprisonment in the county jail not more than one month, or both.

== In other languages ==
In French, "clochard" is a term for the homeless, especially in French cities. The term was historically associated with the romanticizing image of a person who has given up his bourgeois existence for a free life under the Seine bridges in Paris. French public bodies and NGO nowadays prefer the term "sans-abri" or "SDF" (Sans Domicile Fixe).

== See also ==
- Backpacker tourism, a form of low-cost, independent travel
- Bum (disambiguation)
- Christopher McCandless, an American hiker known as "Alexander Supertramp" and the subject of the 1996 biographical book Into the Wild, later adapted into a 2007 film
- Down and Out in Paris and London, a 1933 memoir of George Orwell's experiences as a tramp in London
- Swagman, an Australian itinerant labourer
- Tramp art, a style of woodworking
- Tramp trade, ships with no fixed itinerary that contract on a voyage-by-voyage basis.
- W. H. Davies, a British tramp and later author of The Autobiography of a Super-Tramp in the UK
