= Partners in Crime (1942 film) =

1942 British film by Sidney Gilliat and Frank Launder

- Directed by: Sidney Gilliat; Frank Launder
- Written by: Sidney Gilliat; Frank Launder
- Starring: Irene Handl; Robert Morley; Charles Victor
- Cinematography: Jack E. Cox
- Edited by: Alfred Roome
- Production company: Gainsborough Pictures
- Distributed by: National Filrm Service
- Release date: 1942
- Running time: 9 minutes
- Country: United Kingdom
- Language: English

Partners in Crime is a 1942 British short propaganda film directed and written by Sidney Gilliat and Frank Launder. It was produced for the Ministry of Information by Gainsborough Pictures. It delivers a reprimand to housewives meddling in the black market.

== Plot ==
A burglar breaks into a house, and subsequently sells the stolen goods to a fence in a pub. Mrs Wilson buys black market meat from her butcher, and this transaction is portrayed as a parallel to that between the burglar and fence. The fence is arrested and tried before a judge. After the closing titles of the film the judge breaks the fourth wall and sternly addresses a warning the audience, which includes Mrs Wilson.

== Cast ==
This information is from the British Film Institute. There are no cast credits in the film itself.

- Irene Handl as Mrs Wilson
- Robert Morley as judge
- Charles Victor
- Frederick Burtwell

== Availability ==
Although unavailable on home media, it can be freely viewed in the UK at the British Film Institute's Mediatheque, or on their YouTube channel.
