= What Next? =

1928 film

- German poster
- Directed by: Walter Forde
- Written by: Harry Fowler Mear; Walter Forde
- Produced by: Archibald Nettlefold
- Starring: Walter Forde; Pauline Johnson; Frank Stanmore; Douglas Payne
- Cinematography: Geoffrey Faithfull
- Edited by: Walter Forde
- Production company: Nettlefold Films
- Distributed by: Butcher's Film Service; UFA (Germany)
- Release date: 14 June 1928
- Running time: 6,170 feet
- Country: United Kingdom
- Languages: Silent, English intertitles

What Next? is a 1928 British silent comedy film directed by Walter Forde and starring Forde, Pauline Johnson and Frank Stanmore. It was made at Nettlefold Studios in Walton-on-Thames. There is a copy held at the BFI archive.

== Premise ==
A man acquires a valuable artifact as a present for his girlfriend, inadvertently drawing a lunatic collector into pursuit of him.

== Cast ==
- Walter Forde as Walter
- Pauline Johnson as Violet Chippendale
- Frank Stanmore as Cedric Chippendale
- Douglas Payne as Cornelius Vandergilt
- Charles Dormer as Nick Winterbottom
- Frank Perfitt as Septimus Vandergilt
- Ian Wilson as Wilson

== Bibliography ==
- Low, Rachael. History of the British Film, 1918–1929. George Allen & Unwin, 1971.
- Wood, Linda. British Films, 1927–1939. British Film Institute, 1986.
