= The God in the Garden =

1921 British film

- Directed by: Edwin J. Collins
- Written by: Keble Howard (novel); Edwin J. Collins
- Produced by: Harry B. Parkinson
- Starring: Edith Craig; Arthur Pusey; Mabel Poulton
- Production company: Master Film Company
- Distributed by: Butcher's Film Service
- Release date: October 1921
- Running time: 55 minutes
- Country: United Kingdom
- Languages: Silent; English intertitles

The God in the Garden is a 1921 British silent comedy film directed by Edwin J. Collins and starring Edith Craig, Arthur Pusey and Mabel Poulton. In the film, Cupid brings love to anyone who enters a spinster's garden. The story was based on Keble Howard's 1904 novel of the same name.

The production was filmed in Teddington, close to the River Thames. Keble Howard visited during filming and gave advice on the storyline.

== Cast ==
- Edith Craig as Miss Carroway
- Arthur Pusey as Rev. Mr. Hatch
- Mabel Poulton as Stella
- Mabel Archdall as Alicia Snitterfield
- James English as Mr. Snitterfield
- Beatrice Grosvenor as Jane Box
- Cecil Morton York
- A. Harding Steerman

== Bibliography ==
- Gifford, Denis. The British Film Catalogue. Fitzroy Dearborn, 2001. ISBN 1579581714
- Keble Howard. My Motley Life. Ernest Benn Ltd, 1927. OCLC 963619742
- Low, Rachael. History of the British Film, 1918-1929. George Allen & Unwin, 1971.
