= Third Time Lucky (1931 film) =

1931 film

- Directed by: Walter Forde
- Written by: Sidney Gilliat; Angus MacPhail; H. Fowler Mear
- Based on: Third Time Lucky by Arnold Ridley
- Produced by: Michael Balcon
- Starring: Bobby Howes; Dorothy Boyd; Gordon Harker
- Cinematography: William Shenton
- Edited by: Ian Dalrymple
- Music by: Louis Levy
- Production company: Gainsborough Pictures
- Distributed by: Woolf and Freedman
- Release date: February 1931
- Running time: 85 minutes
- Country: United Kingdom
- Language: English

Third Time Lucky is a 1931 British comedy film directed by Walter Forde and starring Bobby Howes, Dorothy Boyd and Gordon Harker. It was written by Sidney Gilliat, Angus MacPhail and H. Fowler Mear based on the 1929 West End play of the same title by Arnold Ridley, and made at Islington Studios with sets designed by art director Walter Murton.

== Plot ==
Young country vicar Arthur Fear discovers that his ward Jennifer, with whom he is secretly in love, is being blackmailed by her former lover Captain Adrian Crowther. Crowther is in possession of incriminating letters and refuses to surrender them without payment, so Arthur decides to steal them. When he breaks into Crowther's rooms and finds another crook there, Meggitt, they agree to cooperate, robbing the safe of the letters, and valuable bonds. There is a mix-up, however, and Arthur leaves with the bonds rather than the letters. Meggitt assumes that Arthur has double-crossed him, and assumes the identity of a bishop in order to retrieve the bonds. After chaotic adventures, Arthur retrieves the letters.

== Cast ==
- Bobby Howes as Rev. Arthur Fear
- Dorothy Boyd as Jennifer Elling
- Gordon Harker as Bill Meggitt
- Henry Mollison as Stanley Crofts
- Garry Marsh as Captain Adrian Crowther
- Margaret Yarde as Mrs. Clutterbuck
- Harry Terry as Gregg
- Marie Ault as Mrs. Midge
- Clare Greet as Mrs. Scratton
- Matthew Boulton as Inspector

== Reception ==
Film Weekly wrote: "Here's a happy-go-lucky affair, the only and entirely sufficient virtue of which is that it makes you laugh continually and heartily. It has no pretensions to anything else, but it succeeds admirably in its main issue."

Kine Weekly wrote: "A bright, refreshing English clerical-crook comedy, adapted with some imagination from the play by Arnold Ridley, which has quite an original story, and is played by a first-rate cast, all of whom thoroughly enter into the spirit of the entertainment."

The Daily Film Renter wrote: "Farce comedy cleverly directed by Walter Forde. Hilarious adventures of clergyman turned burglar rise to crescendo of laughter in climax."
