= Bart Kennedy =

Bart Kennedy (1861–1930) was an English novelist, memoirist and journalist.

== Biography ==
Kennedy was born in Leeds of Irish parents. From the age of 6 until about the age of 20 he worked in cotton mills and machine shops in Manchester, England. At age 20 he left England, working as a deckhand on a cargo ship which landed him in Philadelphia, Pennsylvania. Illiterate and with no money or formal training, he used the force of his strength (and fist) to "tramp" his way westward across North America. He worked at various laboring jobs including as an oysterman on a skipjack on the Chesapeake Bay; a miner in New York; building railroad sheds in the Canadian Rockies; and panning for gold in the Klondike. He eventually ended up in California where he had various jobs in the theater, including as a singer and actor, before returning to England, where in October 1897 he married Isabel Priestley, a political activist.

== Writing career ==
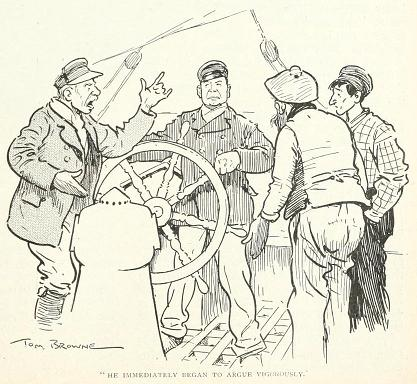
Illustration by Tom Browne from the article "Stone Fishing" by Bart Kennedy. The caption is "He immediately began to argue vigorously", The Wide World Magazine, volume 9" (May-Oct 1902)

Kennedy published his first novel, Darab's Wine Cup, in 1897, followed by The Wandering Romanoff (1898). A fair amount of autobiography is contained in A Man Adrift (1899), A Sailor Tramp (1902) and A Tramp in Spain (1904), books about his "tramping" exploits around the world. John Sutherland (1989) says "As an author, he is one of the early advocates of 'tramping', as the source of literary inspiration."

Kennedy also wrote articles for magazines such as The New Age.

== Published works ==
- Darab's Wine Cup (1897)
- The Wandering Romanoff (1898)
- A Man Adrift (1899)
- A Sailor Tramp (1902)
- A Tramp in Spain (1904)
- Slavery (1905)
- The Green Sphinx (1905)
- A Tramp Camp (1906)
- The German Danger (1907)
- Soldiers of Labour (1917)
- Golden Green (1926)
