= Piano Concerto No. 3 (Williamson) =

The Piano Concerto No. 3 is a 32-minute concerto by the Australian-born composer Malcolm Williamson.

== History of the Work ==
Commissioned by the Australian Broadcasting Commission, Williamson's third piano concerto was written in 1962 while the composer was living in East Sheen, London. The work is dedicated to the British pianist John Ogdon, who gave the world premiere of the work with the Sydney Symphony Orchestra under Joseph Post. The work appeared in a concert given by the BBC Concert Orchestra under conductor Christopher Austin, with Piers Lane as soloist, on 20 November 2001 to celebrate the composer's 70th birthday.

== Structure ==
The concerto is broken up into four separate movements, which are as follows:

1. Allegro (Toccata)
2. Allegretto (Scherzo)
3. Molto largo e cantando
4. Ben Allegro

== Instrumentation ==
Piano soloist; 2 flutes, 2 oboes (2nd doubling cor anglais), 2 clarinets (2nd doubling bass clarinet), 2 bassoons, 4 horns, 2 trumpets, two tenor trombones, bass trombone, tuba, timpani, percussion (including snare drum, triangle & clash cymbals), and strings.

== Recordings ==
The original version (from the LP recorded in 1974) is now available in a newly remastered edition on the Lyrita label with the composer as soloist, accompanied by the London Philharmonic Orchestra under Leonard Dommett. This was the only recording of the concerto for a long time. In 2014 came a new Hyperion recording by Piers Lane with the Tasmanian Symphony Orchestra, led by Howard Shelley (recorded in April 2013).
