= Requiem for a Tribe Brother =

Requiem for a Tribe Brother is a choral work by the Australian-born composer Malcolm Williamson.

== Structure ==
Lasting approximately 30 minutes, the Requiem for a Tribe Brother is one of Williamson's largest unaccompanied choral works, standing alongside the Symphony for Voices of 1962 and the Mass of Saint Etheldreda of 1990 in duration. Williamson divides up the extensive text of the traditional Requiem Mass into ten movements, as follows:

1. Requiem aeternam (Introit)
  A brooding chant-like refrain for male voices, simulating the drone of a didgeridoo, alternates with homophonic passages for full choir.
2. Kyrie
  A tender 3-minute chorale with a harmonic palette which is neither diatonic nor chromatic. This is typical of Williamson, as is consistent throughout the Requiem.
3. Domine Jesu Christe (Offertory)
  Much in the manner of the opening Requiem aeternam, passages for soloists are contrasted with densely harmonised sections for the full choir. At nearly 5 minutes, this is the largest and most varied movement of the work.
4. Pie Jesu
  Highly operatic solos for tenor and alto are pitted against a richly coloured chordal backdrop for full choir.
5. Sanctus
  After a grand and imposing statement of "Sanctus ... etc.", there is a lively dance-like coda in 5/8 metre on the word "Hosanna".
6. Benedictus
  A mysterious introduction is followed by a reprise of the "Hosannas" from the previous movement.
7. Agnus Dei
  In common with the second movement, the Agnus Dei is a slow chorale, featuring a highly pungent harmonic language and many unusual shifts of key.
8. Lux aeterna (Communion)
  This movement features two soprano soli which float above the rest of the choir throughout.
9. Libera me
  A fast and fiery dance primarily for tenors, built on an ostinato figure in the basses. Towards the end of the movement, there is a brief reprise of material from the opening Requiem aeternam.
10. In Paradisum
  The serene concluding movement, in C major, derives its melody from the opening of the Song of Hope from Williamson's choral-symphony for Kath Walker, The Dawn Is At Hand (1987–89).

== Recordings ==
- Naxos: Joyful Company of Singers, directed by Peter Broadbent.
