= Jean Colin =

British actress (1905–1989)

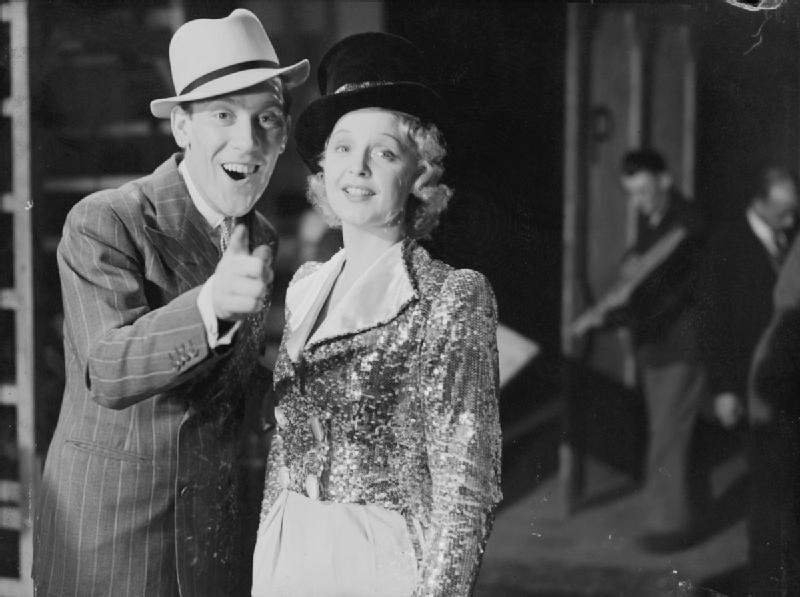
Colin with Tommy Trinder during the making of Communal Kitchen: Eating Out With Tommy Trinder for the Ministry of Information in 1941

Jean Colin (24 March 1905 – 7 March 1989) was an English actress. She began her career on stage in pantomime, musical theatre and operettas. She appeared in several films beginning in the 1930s.

Colin was born in Brighton, Sussex and died in London. In her later years, she lived in a flat near Marble Arch in central London.

== Career ==
Her stage debut was in 1923 in Brighton when Mary Lynn, niece of Ralph Lynn, persuaded her to work up a dancing act with her. Her big chance came when she was given the part originally meant for June in The Five O'Clock Girl. The Hate Ship (1930) was her first film.

== Selected filmography ==
- The Hate Ship (1930)
- Compromising Daphne (1930)
- Lord Babs (1932)
- Charing Cross Road (1935)
- Such Is Life (1936)
- Stardust (1938)
- The Mikado (1939)
- Laugh It Off (1940)
- Bob's Your Uncle (1941)
- Last Holiday (1950)
- Laxdale Hall (1953)
