= The Ringer (1931 film) =

British crime film

- Poster with Esmond Knight and Carol Goodner
- Directed by: Walter Forde
- Written by: Sidney Gilliat; Angus MacPhail; Robert Stevenson
- Based on: The Gaunt Stranger by Edgar Wallace
- Produced by: Michael Balcon
- Starring: Patric Curwen; Esmond Knight; John Longden; Carol Goodner
- Cinematography: Alex Bryce
- Edited by: Ian Dalrymple
- Production companies: Gainsborough Pictures; British Lion Films
- Distributed by: Ideal Films
- Release date: April 1931
- Running time: 75 minutes
- Country: United Kingdom
- Language: English

The Ringer is a 1931 British crime film directed by Walter Forde and starring Patric Curwen, Esmond Knight, John Longden and Carol Goodner. It was written by Sidney Gilliat, Angus MacPhail and Robert Stevenson based on the 1925 Edgar Wallace story The Gaunt Stranger, which became a play, The Ringer, in 1929.

Scotland Yard detectives hunt for a dangerous criminal who has recently returned to England.

Forde remade the same story in 1938 as The Gaunt Stranger. There was also a silent film of The Ringer in 1928, and a 1952 version starring Donald Wolfit.

== Cast ==
- Patric Curwen as Dr. Lomond
- Esmond Knight as John Lenley
- John Longden as Inspector Wembury
- Carol Goodner as Cora Ann Milton
- Gordon Harker as Samuel Hackett
- Franklin Dyall as Maurice Meister
- Dorothy Bartlam as Mary Lenley
- Henry Hallett as Inspector Bliss
- Arthur Stratton as Sgt. Carter
- Kathleen Joyce as Gwenda Milton
- Eric Stanley as Commissioner

== Production ==
The film was made at Beaconsfield Studios in Buckinghamshire by Gainsborough Pictures in a co-production with British Lion Films. The film's sets were designed by the art director Norman G. Arnold. Bryan Edgar Wallace acted as a production manager.

== Critical reception ==
Film Weekly wrote: "Here is a really capable adaptation of the famous Edgar Wallace play. Walter Forde his entered into the spirit of the original and manipulated thrills and laughter to provide a good entertainment which will please all readers of our most prolific novelist. The story of the mysterious criminal who terrorises a continent is too well known to need repetition, but it loses nothing of its appeal in this workman like talkie. Gordon Harker gives a fine perrformance and stands out of a capable cast."

The New York Times wrote, "This film, which hails from England, is the sort of melodrama that provides more amusement than excitement."

In The BFI Companion to Crime, Phil Hardy wrote, "this is the best version of this oft-filmed play... Directed by Forde with a slickness and pace unusual in British films of the period, especially considering the film's stage origins... Hokum, but enjoyable."
