= Our Man in Havana (opera) =

1963 opera by Malcolm Williamson based on the 1958 novel

- Opera by Malcolm Williamson
- Librettist: Sidney Gilliat
- Language: English
- Based on: Graham Greene's 1958 novel Our Man in Havana
- Premiere: 2 July 1963; Sadler's Wells Theatre, London

Our Man in Havana is an opera in three acts composed by Malcolm Williamson to a libretto by Sidney Gilliat based on Graham Greene's 1958 novel Our Man in Havana. Williamson's first full-scale opera, it was premiered on 2 July 1963 at Sadler's Wells Theatre in London.

Its first performance in East Germany was in Karl-Marx-Stadt (today Chemnitz) in May 1966, with Renate Härtel, Eva Lehoczky, Elisabeth Fuchs, Peter Slawow, Konrad Rupf, Egon Schulz, Gerhard Scherfling, Manfred Drescher, conducted by Gerhard Rolf Bauer. The opera was presented at the Csokonai Theatre in Debrecen, Hungary, in May 1967, with Jozsef Csongor, Gyorgy Trefas, Magda Marsay, Janos Gazso, Gyorgy Siklos, Zsuzsa Marczaly, Kriszta Tibay, Miklos Albert, Jozsef Toth, Mihaly Viragos, conducted by Vilmos Rubányi.

After years of neglect it was revived in 2016 by Lyric Opera of Melbourne at the Melbourne Athenaeum theatre.

== Roles ==
Roles, voice types, premiere cast
Role	Voice type	Premiere cast, 2 July 1963 Conductor: James Loughran
Dr Hasselbacher	bass	Owen Brannigan
Bramble	tenor	Raymond Nilsson
Lopez	tenor	Stanley Bevan
Milly	soprano	Joyce Millward
Segura	baritone	Raimund Herincx
Hawthorne	baritone	Eric Shilling
Beatrice (Mrs Weston)	soprano	April Cantelo
Carter	baritone	David Bowman
Chorus
