= Walter Forde =

British actor, screenwriter and director (1898–1984)

- Born: Thomas Seymour Woolford; 21 April 1898; London, England
- Died: 7 January 1984 (aged 85); Los Angeles, California, US
- Occupations: Actor; Writer; Film director

Walter Forde (born Thomas Seymour Woolford, 21 April 1898 – 7 January 1984) was a British actor, screenwriter and director. Born in Lambeth, South London in 1898, he directed over fifty films between 1919 from the silent era through to 1949 in the sound era. He died in Los Angeles, California in 1984.

Forde was the son of the music hall comedian Tom Seymour. During the 1920s, he was a silent film comedian, acting in a series of shorts before shifting into directing feature films. Emerging as an established film director in the 1930s, he directed films for Gainsborough Pictures and Ealing Studios.

Forde worked several times with Michael Balcon who wrote "when he turned to directing films his sense of timing, especially in comedy, was impeccable. He made the changeover to sound films very easily, never forgetting that movies must move and consequently not falling into the common errors of leaning on dialogue or keeping the now heavily ‘blimped’ and somewhat cumbersome cameras in fixed positions."

== Filmography ==
=== Actor ===
- The Handy Man (1920)
- Never Say Die (1920)
- Fishing for Trouble (1920)
- Walter's Winning Ways (1921)
- Walter Finds a Father (1921)
- The Economist (1921)
- Walter's Trying Frolic (1922)
- Walter Wins a Wager (1922)
- Walter Wants Work (1922)
- Walter Makes a Movie (1922)
- Radio Romeo (1923)
- Good Deeds (1923)
- Walter's Worries (1926)
- Walter's Playing Policy (1926)
- Walter's Day Out (1926)
- Walter the Sleuth (1926)
- Walter the Prodigal (1926)
- Walter Tells the Tale (1926)
- Wait and See (1928)
- What Next? (1928)
- Would You Believe It? (1929)
- You'd Be Surprised! (1930)
- Lord Babs (1932)
- Cheer Boys Cheer (1939)

=== Director ===
- Wait and See (1928)
- What Next? (1928)
- The Silent House (1929)
- Would You Believe It? (1929)
- Red Pearls (1930)
- Bed and Breakfast (1930)
- Lord Richard in the Pantry (1930)
- The Last Hour (1930)
- You'd Be Surprised! (1930)
- Third Time Lucky (1931)
- The Ringer (1931)
- Splinters in the Navy (1931)
- The Ghost Train (1931)
- Condemned to Death (1932)
- Lord Babs (1932)
- Jack's the Boy (1932)
- Rome Express (1932)
- Orders Is Orders (1933)
- Jack Ahoy (1934)
- Chu Chin Chow (1934)
- Bulldog Jack (1935)
- Forever England (1935)
- King of the Damned (1935)
- Land Without Music (1936)
- Kicking the Moon Around (1938)
- The Gaunt Stranger (1938)
- Let's Be Famous (1939)
- The Four Just Men (1939)
- Cheer Boys Cheer (1939)
- Inspector Hornleigh on Holiday (1939)
- Saloon Bar (1940)
- Sailors Three (1940)
- Charley's (Big-Hearted) Aunt (1940)
- Atlantic Ferry (1941)
- The Ghost Train (1941)
- Inspector Hornleigh Goes to It (1941)
- Go to Blazes (1942, short)
- The Peterville Diamond (1942)
- Flying Fortress (1942)
- It's That Man Again (1943)
- Time Flies (1944)
- One Exciting Night (1944)
- Master of Bankdam (1947)
- Cardboard Cavalier (1949)

== Bibliography ==
- Hunter, I.Q. & Porter, Laraine. British Comedy Cinema. Routledge, 2012.
