= Malcolm Williamson =

Australian composer (1931–2003)

Malcolm Williamson AO CBE
- Born: Malcolm Benjamin Graham Christopher Williamson; 21 November 1931; Sydney, NSW, Australia
- Died: 2 March 2003 (aged 71); Cambridge, England
- Occupation: Composer
- Works: List of compositions

19th Master of the Queen's Music
- In office October 1975 – 2 March 2003
- Monarch: Elizabeth II
- Preceded by: Arthur Bliss
- Succeeded by: Peter Maxwell Davies

Malcolm Benjamin Graham Christopher Williamson (21 November 1931 – 2 March 2003) was an Australian composer. He was the Master of the Queen's Music from 1975 until his death. According to Grove Music Online, although Williamson's earlier compositions aligned with Serialist techniques, "he later modified his approach to composition in the search of a more inclusive musical language that was fundamentally tonal and, above all, lyrical. In the 1960s, he was commonly referred to as the most often commissioned composer in Britain, and over his lifetime he produced more than 250 works in a wide variety of genres."

== Life and career ==
Williamson was born in Sydney in 1931; his father was an Anglican priest, Rev. George Williamson. He studied composition and horn at the Sydney Conservatorium of Music. His teachers included Eugene Goossens. In 1950 he moved to London where he worked as an organist, a proofreader, and a nightclub pianist. In 1952 he converted to Roman Catholicism. From 1953 he studied with Elisabeth Lutyens and Erwin Stein. His first major success was with his Piano Concerto No. 1, premiered by Clive Lythgoe at the 1958 Cheltenham Festival to a standing ovation. Williamson was a prolific composer at this time, receiving many commissions and often performing his own works, both on organ and piano.

In 1975, the death of Arthur Bliss left the title of Master of the Queen's Music vacant. The selection of Williamson to fill this post was a surprise, over other composers such as Benjamin Britten (whose compositional inactivity and terminal illness were not then publicly known), Michael Tippett and Malcolm Arnold, such that William Walton had remarked that "the wrong Malcolm" had been chosen. In addition, Williamson was the first (and to this day the only) non-Briton to hold the post. He wrote a number of pieces connected to his royal post, including Mass of Christ the King (1978) (see below) and Lament in Memory of Lord Mountbatten of Burma (1980). However, controversy attended his tenure, notably his failure to complete the intended "Jubilee Symphony" for the Silver Jubilee of Queen Elizabeth II in 1977. He became less prolific in "Royal" works during the last twenty years or so of his life, although he never completely ceased to take interest in writing music for the Royal Family (see list of Royal works below). His overall compositional output slowed considerably due to a series of illnesses. He died in 2003 in a hospital in Cambridge. He was widely reported to have been an alcoholic.

Williamson married an American, Dolores "Dolly" Daniel, in 1960 and they had one son and two daughters.

Williamson had a number of relationships with both sexes, both before and after his marriage. After his marriage broke down in the 1970s, “a deep relationship with musician and publisher Simon Campion helped sustain him through the inevitably stormy periods, both in Australia and in England, that characterised the final stages of his career.”

He had a series of strokes that left him needing a wheelchair, and he spent his final months in hospital. His funeral was not attended by any representatives of the Royal Family.

== Music ==
Some of Williamson's early works use the twelve-tone technique of Arnold Schoenberg, but his greatest influence is often said to be Olivier Messiaen. He discovered Messiaen's music shortly before converting to Roman Catholicism in 1952. He was also influenced by Benjamin Britten, as well as by jazz and popular music (this latter influence may have come in part from him working as a night club pianist in the 1950s).

Williamson wrote seven symphonies; four numbered piano concertos (plus the Concerto for Two Pianos and Strings, the Concerto for Two Pianos and Wind Quintet, after Alan Rawsthorne, and the Sinfonia Concertante), concertos for violin, organ, harp and saxophone; and many other orchestral works. He wrote ballets, including Sun into Darkness and The Display, many effective choral works, chamber music, music for solo piano, and music for film and television including the prologue and main title of Watership Down. His operas include English Eccentrics, to a libretto by Edith Sitwell; Our Man in Havana, after the novel by Graham Greene; The Violins of Saint-Jacques, from Patrick Leigh Fermor's novel; and two adaptations of plays by August Strindberg, Lucky Peter's Journey after Lycko-Pers resa, and The Growing Castle after A Dream Play. Williamson's music for children includes the operas The Happy Prince (based on the story by Oscar Wilde) and Julius Caesar Jones as well as cassations, which are short operas with audience participation. The cassation The Valley and the Hill was written for the Silver Jubilee of Queen Elizabeth II in 1977 and performed by 18,000 children.

The composer's largest choral work, his Mass of Christ the King, was commissioned by the Three Choirs Festival, also for the 1977 jubilee. It attracted attention partly because Williamson delivered it late. Scored for two sopranos, tenor, baritone; soprano, alto, tenor, bass (henceforth SATB) chorus; SATB echo choir; and large orchestra, the work received several performances over a few years, including a live BBC broadcast in 1981, but has more recently been overlooked. A recording of a performance at the Perth Festival 1981 can be found on YouTube.

Williamson became generally much less prolific in later life, although he had some very busy years. For example, in 1988 Williamson wrote a large-scale choral-orchestral work The True Endeavour, the orchestral Bicentennial Anthem, the Fanfare of Homage for military band, a ballet Have Steps Will Travel for John Alleyne and the National Ballet of Canada, Ceremony for Oodgeroo (Oodgeroo Noonuccal, formerly known as Kath Walker) for brass quintet, and also commenced work on a substantial new choral-symphony The Dawn is at Hand (to texts by Kath Walker), completed and performed in Australia the following year. Other works include the Requiem for a Tribe Brother (another Australian work, completed in 1992), a third string quartet (1993), a fourth piano concerto (1994, for Marguerite Wolff) and a symphony for solo harp, Day That I Have Loved (1994). The orchestral song cycle on texts by Iris Murdoch, A Year of Birds, premiered at The Proms in 1995. The same year also saw the premiere of an orchestral work With Proud Thanksgiving, commissioned for the fiftieth anniversary of the United Nations, and dedicated to the memory of Williamson's long-time friend, the UK Prime Minister Harold Wilson.

At the funeral of Queen Elizabeth II, held on Monday, 19 September 2022, mourners filed into Westminster Abbey to 'O Paradise' by Williamson.

=== Selected recordings ===
- Organ Concerto, Third Piano Concerto. London Philharmonic Orchestra. Lyrita SRCS 79 (1975)
- Elevamini, Sinfonia Concertante, Violin Concerto. London Philharmonic Orchestra, Adrian Boult. HMV SLS 5085 (1977)
- Choral Music. Joyful Company of Singers, Peter Broadbent. Naxos 8557783 (2006)
- Orchestral Works Vol. 1. Iceland Symphony Orchestra, Rumon Gamba. Chandos CHAN 10359 (2006)
- Orchestral Works Vol. 2. Iceland Symphony Orchestra, Rumon Gamba. CHAN 10406 (2007)
- Complete Piano Concertos. Piers Lane, Tasmanian Symphony Orchestra, Howard Shelley. Hyperion CDA68011/2 (2014)
- Organ Music. Tom Winpenny. Naxos 8.571375-76 (2016)
- Complete Works For Piano. Antony Gray. ABC Classics ABC4814390 (2017)
- Chamber Music for Wind and Piano. New London Chamber Ensemble. Divine Art DDX21120 (2025)

== Honours ==
Williamson was appointed a Commander of the Order of the British Empire (CBE) in 1976, and an honorary Officer of the Order of Australia (AO) in 1987. Honorary awards of the Order of Australia are made only to people who are not citizens of Australia. It is not clear why Williamson did not qualify for a substantive award, as there appears to be nothing on the public record to suggest he ever relinquished his Australian citizenship. The citation for the award read "For service to music and the mentally handicapped". He was the first Master of the Queen's Music in over a century not to be knighted.

Court offices
Preceded by Arthur Bliss	Master of the Queen's Music; 1975–2003	Succeeded by Peter Maxwell Davies
