= Monkhouse =

Monkhouse is a surname. Notable people with the surname include:

- Alan Monkhouse (1930–1992), English footballer
- Allan Monkhouse (1858–1936), English playwright, critic, essayist and novelist
- Amy Monkhouse (born 1979), lawn bowler
- Andy Monkhouse (born 1980), English footballer
- Bob Monkhouse, OBE (1928–2003), English entertainer
- Christopher P. Monkhouse (1947-2021), Architectural historian
- Graham Monkhouse (born 1954), former English cricketer
- Harry Monkhouse (1854-1901), English actor
- Michelle Monkhouse (1991–2011), Canadian fashion model
- Steve Monkhouse (born 1962), former English cricketer
- Victoria Monkhouse (1883–1970), English painter
- William Cosmo Monkhouse (1840–1901), English poet and critic

== See also ==
- Monkhouse Davison (1713–1793), the senior partner in leading London grocers Davison Newman and Co
- The Bob Monkhouse Hour, televised variety show in the 1950s fronted by the comedian Bob Monkhouse
- The Bob Monkhouse Show, entertainment show presented by Bob Monkhouse
- Monk's House
