= Lucky Jim (1957 film) =

- Original British quad format film poster
- Directed by: John Boulting
- Screenplay by: Patrick Campbell
- Based on: Lucky Jim by Kingsley Amis
- Produced by: Roy Boulting
- Starring: Ian Carmichael; Terry-Thomas; Hugh Griffith; Sharon Acker
- Cinematography: Mutz Greenbaum
- Edited by: Max Benedict
- Music by: John Addison
- Production company: Charter Film Productions
- Distributed by: British Lion Films
- Release date: 17 September 1957 (UK)
- Running time: 95 minutes
- Country: United Kingdom
- Language: English
- Budget: £172,289

Lucky Jim is a 1957 British comedy film directed by John Boulting and starring Ian Carmichael, Terry-Thomas and Hugh Griffith. It is an adaptation of the 1954 novel Lucky Jim by Kingsley Amis.

== Plot ==
Jim Dixon is a young lecturer in history at a redbrick university, who manages to offend his head of department and create various disastrous incidents. When he eventually delivers a lecture drunk, he feels forced to resign. But just as his career seems over, he is offered a job in London, and when he learns that the girl of his dreams is on her way to the railway station, he chases after her in the professor's old car. The professor's whole family chases after, and arrives at the station just in time to see Jim and the girl disappear on the train to London.

== Main cast ==
- Ian Carmichael as James "Jim" Dixon
- Terry-Thomas as Bertrand Welch
- Hugh Griffith as Professor Welch
- Sharon Acker as Christine Callaghan
- Jean Anderson as Mrs Welch
- Maureen Connell as Margaret Peel
- Clive Morton as Sir Hector Gore-Urquhart
- John Welsh as The Principal
- Reginald Beckwith as university porter
- Kenneth Griffith as Cyril Johns
- Jeremy Hawk as Bill Atkinson
- Ronald Cardew as registrar
- Penny Morrell as Miss Wilson
- John Cairney as Roberts
- Ian Wilson as glee singer
- Charles Lamb as contractor
- Henry B. Longhurst as Professor Hutchinson
- Jeremy Longhurst as waiter

== Reception ==
=== Box office ===
According to Kinematograph Weekly the film was "in the money" at the British box office in 1957.

According to the same magazine, the movie "failed to eclipse its stable companions, Private’s Progress and Brothers In Law, but nevertheless attracted plenty of coin."

=== Critical ===
The film critic writing for The Times, gave the film a mixed review after the UK premiere in September 1957, stating that the film, "carries over enough gusto from the original to be funnier than the usual run of British comedies, without managing to avoid lapses into incoherence through pressing the Joke too far."

When the film premiered in the United States a year later, Howard Thompson of The New York Times described Ian Carmichael as "an English answer to Jerry Lewis": "let's fervently hope this stale attempt at mirth, furiously sliding back and forth from leaden coyness to plain custard-pie confusion, doesn't mean the end of all the sly, civilized fun we've come to expect from the British specialists."

In his 2010 obituary of Ian Carmichael, Guardian contributor Dennis Barker wrote: "One of his most characteristic and memorable sorties... was his portrayal of Kingsley Amis's Lucky Jim—the anti-hero James Dixon, who savaged the pretensions of academia, as Amis had himself sometimes clashed with academia when he was a lecturer at Swansea. Appearing in John and Roy Boulting's 1957 film, he was able to suggest an unruly but amiable spirit at the end of its tether, his great horsey teeth exposed in the strained grimace that often greeted disaster."

== Song ==
The film's end titles credit "the voice of Al Fernhead" with singing the distinctive repeated "O Lucky Jim" phrase, from the eponymous song whose composers are credited as Fred V. Bowers and Charles Horwitz. The Bowers–Horwitz song "Ah, lucky Jim" inspired the book's title.
