= Heavens Above! =

1963 British film by John and Roy Boulting

- Theatrical Film Poster
- Directed by: John Boulting; Roy Boulting
- Written by: Frank Harvey
- Produced by: John Boulting; Roy Boulting
- Starring: Peter Sellers; Cecil Parker; Isabel Jeans; Eric Sykes; Bernard Miles; Ian Carmichael; Irene Handl; Roy Kinnear; Miriam Karlin; Brock Peters
- Cinematography: Mutz Greenbaum
- Edited by: Teddy Darvas
- Music by: Richard Rodney Bennett
- Production companies: Charter Film Productions; Romulus Films
- Distributed by: British Lion Films (UK)
- Release date: 23 May 1963 (UK)
- Running time: 113 min.
- Country: United Kingdom
- Language: English

Heavens Above! is a 1963 British satirical comedy film directed and produced by John and Roy Boulting, and starring Peter Sellers. It was written by John Boulting and Frank Harvey, from an idea by Malcolm Muggeridge.

== Plot ==
A naive but caring prison chaplain, John Smallwood, is accidentally assigned as vicar to the small and prosperous English country town of Orbiston Parva, instead of a cleric with the same name who is favoured by the Bishop who wants to maintain the support for the church of the Despard family, who practically run the town and operate a large factory there.

Smallwood's belief in the practical application of charity and forgiveness sets him at odds with the locals, whose assertions that they are good, Christian people are belied in Smallwood's eyes by their behaviour and ideas. He creates social ructions by appointing a black dustman as his churchwarden, taking in a family being evicted from their illegal encampment, and persuading local landowner Lady Despard to provide food for the church to distribute free to the people of the town.

His scheme spirals out of control and very soon the local traders are up in arms as they have lost all their customers. He tries to explain this to the residents but is besieged in the church hall and only just rescued by the police.

As a face-saving act, the Bishop appoints the "correct" Smallwood to the parish and assigns the "troublemaker" to the Scottish island of "Ultima Thule" and makes him "Bishop of Outer Space" to the British space operations based there. But when the intended pilot of the first rocket gets cold feet, Smallwood takes his place. He is last heard broadcasting hymns over the space capsule's radio.

== Locations ==
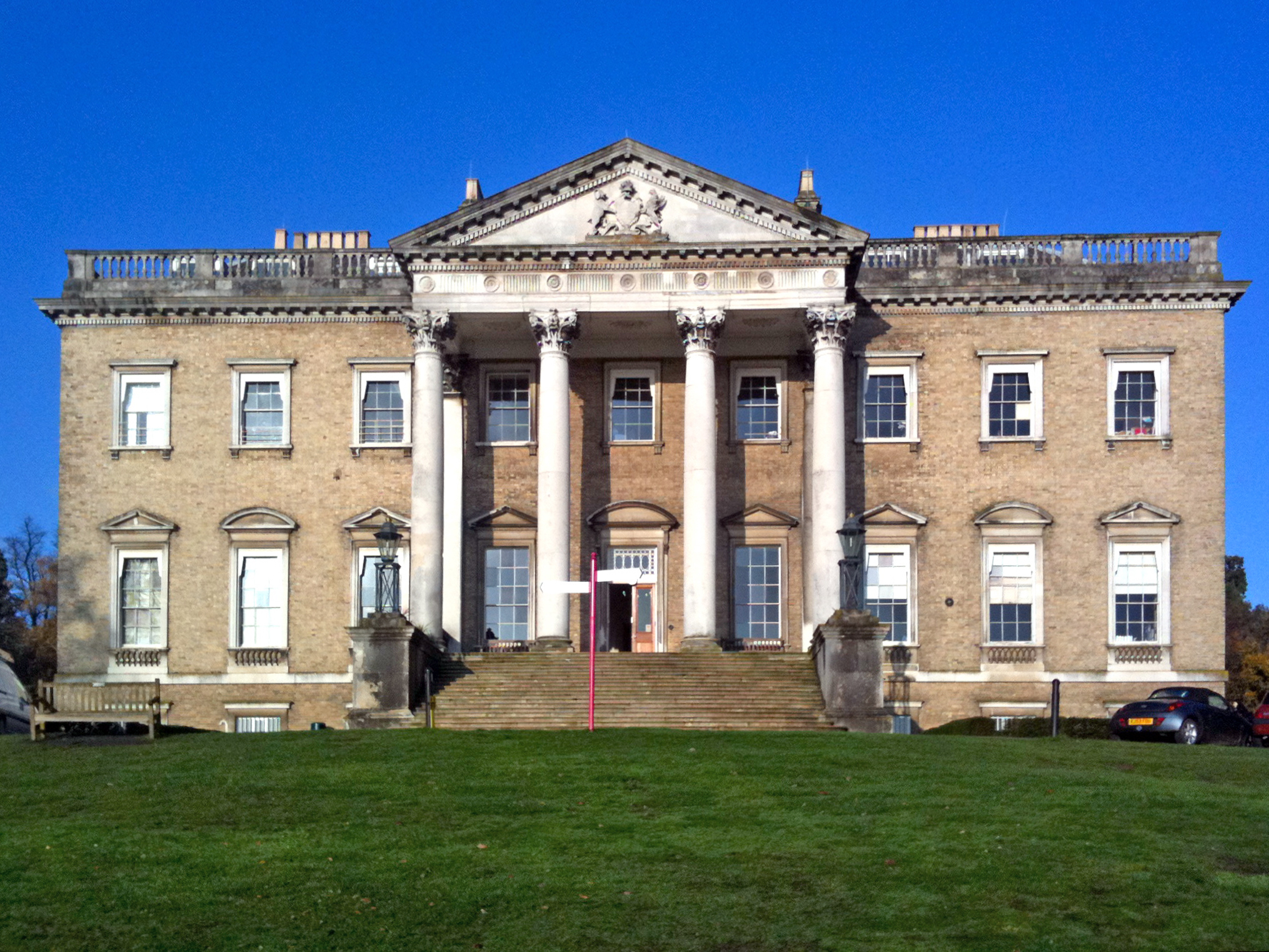
Claremont (2010)

The film was shot at Shepperton Studios, England. Shepperton railway station served as the station of the fictional Orbiston Parva. The mansion where Lady Despard resided was Claremont in Surrey, a listed building designed by the renowned architect Capability Brown built in 1774.

== Cast ==
- Peter Sellers as the Reverend John Edward Smallwood
- Cecil Parker as Archdeacon Aspinall
- Isabel Jeans as Lady Lucy Despard
- Ian Carmichael as the other Smallwood
- Bernard Miles as Simpson
- Brock Peters as Matthew Robinson
- Eric Sykes as Harry Smith
- Irene Handl as Rene Smith
- Miriam Karlin as Winnie Smith
- Joan Miller as Mrs. Smith-Gould
- Miles Malleson as Rockeby
- Eric Barker as bank manager
- William Hartnell as Major Fowler, town councillor
- Roy Kinnear as Fred Smith
- Joan Hickson as housewife
- Kenneth Griffith as Reverend Owen Thomas
- Mark Eden as Sir Geoffrey Despard
- John Comer as butcher
- Basil Dignam as prison governor
- Franklin Engelmann as TV commentator
- Colin Gordon as the Prime Minister
- Geoffrey Hibbert as council official
- Joan Heal as disgruntled housewife
- Ludovic Kennedy as himself
- Margery Lawrence as quarrelling housewife
- Harry Locke as shop steward
- Henry Longhurst as deaf man
- Malcolm Muggeridge as cleric
- Derek Nimmo as the Director-General's assistant
- Conrad Phillips as P.R.O.
- Nicholas Phipps as the Director-General
- Cardew Robinson as tramp
- Gerald Sim as store manager
- Olive Sloane as housewife
- Marianne Stone as Miss Palmer
- Elsie Wagstaff lady on parish council
- Thorley Walters as Tranquilax executive
- Ian Wilson as Salvation Army major
- George Woodbridge as the Bishop
- Josephine Woodford as Doris Smith
- Ronald Adam as Cabinet Minister (uncredited)
- Rodney Bewes as milkfloat driver (uncredited)
- John Boxer as Stockbroker (uncredited)
- Ed Devereaux as communication officer (uncredited)
- John Glyn-Jones as Professor (uncredited)
- Drewe Henley as Doris's boy friend (uncredited)
- John Junkin as Reporter at Space Launch Site (uncredited)
- Margaret Lacey as Molly (uncredited)
- Steve Marriott as Jack (uncredited)

== Release ==
The film premiered in London on 23 May 1963 at the Columbia Cinema in Shaftesbury Avenue (later the Curzon Soho).

== Reception ==
=== Box office ===
It was one of the 12 most popular films in Britain in 1963.

=== Critical ===
The Monthly Film Bulletin wrote: "Way off target as a satire, the Boultings' latest effort is remarkable chiefly for the amount of schoolboy smut it manages to incorporate, and for the nastiness of its view of people. Buñuel castigates mankind because he is urgently concerned for it; Heavens Above! despises everybody just about equally, even its heroes. Matthew, the 'liberally' conceived coloured man, for example, is presented insultingly (through no fault of the actor) as one of those simpleminded, hymn-singing innocents with water-melon smiles. The whimsical ending; the crude caricaturing in most of the characterisation; the aimless lashing out at everything in sight; the sentimental imagery of an angelic child and a forlorn teddy-bear to point up Smallwood's message of charity and the barren ground in which it has fallen – all point to real desperation. Half-a-dozen funny lines, an excellent performance by Peter Sellers, and good ones from Isabel Jeans, Cecil Parker and Brock Peters, don't take the film very far"

The Times found it lacking the mild bite and satire of the Boulting-Sellers film I'm All Right Jack

== Analysis ==
An article in Garden History likened the character of Smallwood to that of the 18th century picturesque guru William Gilpin: "The first act of the new reverend is to invite a group of colourful travellers to reside in the vicarage; the second is to convince an old lady to open her house and grounds to all sorts of poor vagabonds, scruffs and vagrants, characters who bring picturesque values to the noble scene. Eventually, a picturesque economic system based on free donation causes havoc in the village and the nation – the reverend is made a bishop and sent into space, in Britain's first spaceship. The film revives a character that one can safely imagine as a modern version of Doctor Syntax – cordial, dedicated, stubborn, fearless, not reacting against, but slightly diverging from, the established values of his culture."
