= Desert Island Discs =

BBC Radio 4 programme

- Desert Island Discs logo used on the BBC website
- Genre: Talk radio; music
- Running time: 1 hour
- Country of origin: United Kingdom
- Language: English
- Home station: BBC Forces Programme (1942–1944); BBC Home Service (1943–1944, 1951–1967); BBC Light Programme (1945–1946); BBC Radio 4 (1967–present)
- Hosted by: Roy Plomley (1942–1985); Michael Parkinson (1986–1988); Sue Lawley (1988–2006); Kirsty Young (2006–2018); Lauren Laverne (2018–present)
- Created by: Roy Plomley
- Produced by: Gillian Hush; Olivia Seligman; Angie Nehring; Miranda Birch; Leanne Buckle; Cathy Drysdale
- Recording studio: Broadcasting House
- Original release: 29 January 1942
- No. of episodes: 3,227 (28 March 2020) c.3400 (August 2024)
- Opening theme: "By the Sleepy Lagoon" by Eric Coates
- Website: BBC website

Desert Island Discs is a radio programme broadcast on BBC Radio 4. It was first broadcast on the BBC Forces Programme on 29 January 1942.

Each week a guest, called a "castaway" during the programme, is asked to choose eight audio recordings (usually, but not always, music), a book and a luxury item that they would like to take if they were to be cast away on a desert island, while discussing their life and the reasons for their choices. It was devised and originally presented by Roy Plomley, and over the years has been presented by Michael Parkinson, Sue Lawley, Kirsty Young and current host Lauren Laverne.

More than 3,400 episodes have been recorded, with some guests having appeared more than once and some episodes featuring more than one guest. An example of a guest who falls into both categories is Bob Monkhouse, who appeared with his co-writer Denis Goodwin on 12 December 1955 and in his own right on 20 December 1998.

When Desert Island Discs marked its 75th year in 2017, The Guardian called the show a radio classic. In February 2019 a panel of broadcasting industry experts named it the greatest radio programme of all time.

== Format ==
Guests are invited to imagine themselves cast away on a desert island, and choose eight audio recordings (originally gramophone records) they would like to take with them; discussion of their choices permits a review of their life. Excerpts from their choices are played or, in the case of short pieces, the whole work. At the end of the programme, they are asked to choose the one piece they regard most highly. Guests are also automatically given the Complete Works of Shakespeare and either the Bible or another appropriate religious or philosophical work, and then prompted to select a third book to accompany them. Popular choices include Charles Dickens and Jane Austen. The actress Judi Dench, who has macular degeneration, was permitted to take an audiobook in place of a printed manuscript.

Guests also choose one luxury, which must be inanimate and of no practical use on or in escaping from the island or allowing communication from outside. Roy Plomley usually enforced these rules strictly, but he did grant a special dispensation to Princess Michael of Kent, who chose her pet cat. However, subsequent presenters have allowed more variation on the rules; John Cleese was allowed to take Michael Palin with him, on the condition that he was dead and stuffed. Examples of luxuries have included champagne and a piano, the latter of which is one of the most requested luxuries.

After Plomley's death in 1985, the programme was presented by Michael Parkinson from 1986 to 1988, then from 1988 to 2006 by Sue Lawley, and from 2006 to 2018 by Kirsty Young. Young was replaced by 6 Music presenter Lauren Laverne, who interviewed the diver Tom Daley for her first episode, broadcast on 30 September 2018. Laverne was initially drafted in as an interim presenter while Young was suffering from fibromyalgia; she was appointed permanently in July 2019 when Young announced her decision not to return.

The programme was extended from 45 minutes to an hour from spring 2024.

== Notable guests ==
The first castaway was Vic Oliver, in January 1942. Several castaways, including Celia Johnson, Arthur Askey, Trevor Nunn, John Schlesinger, Kenneth Williams, Terry Wogan, Brian Rix, David Attenborough, John Mortimer, Adele Leigh, Delia Smith and Stephen Fry, have been cast away more than once. The most requested piece of music over the first 60 years was "Ode to Joy", the last movement of Ludwig van Beethoven's Ninth Symphony. One of the most remarked broadcasts was Elisabeth Schwarzkopf's 1958 selection of seven of her own recordings. This record was subsequently beaten by the pianist Moura Lympany on her second appearance on the programme on 28 July 1979 when all eight of her selections were of her own recordings.

In the early 1970s, the writer Alistair MacLean was chosen as a guest, but the head of the European wing of the Ontario Tourist Bureau, who had the same name, was accidentally invited instead. Plomley realised the error while conversing with MacLean shortly before they were set to record the programme. Without any time to find another guest, the interview was completed, but it was never broadcast.

In January 1981, Princess Margaret appeared as a castaway on the programme.

== Opening theme ==
Plomley originally wanted the sounds of "surf breaking on a shore and the cries of sea birds" to open and close each programme. However, Leslie Prowne, the head of popular record programmes at the BBC, was concerned that it lacked definition and insisted that music should also be used. Plomley and the series' producer Frederic Piffard selected "By the Sleepy Lagoon", composed by Eric Coates (who appeared on the show in 1951). The tune has been used since the first transmission in 1942. The sound of herring gulls has accompanied the music except for a period of time in 1964 when tropical bird sounds were used.

== Copyright status ==
Until late September 2009, Desert Island Discs could not be heard on the BBC's iPlayer service, which allowed most programmes to be heard up to a week after transmission. The programme's website stated that this was due to rights issues, as explained in The Sunday Times in 2006.

It was announced on 27 September 2009 that an agreement had been reached as a result of which the programme would be available to stream via the iPlayer. The first episode available through the iPlayer was with Barry Manilow. Subsequently, the programme was also made available as a podcast, beginning with the edition broadcast on 29 November 2009, which featured Morrissey. However, due to music clearance issues, the music selections on the podcast versions are reduced to only playing for around 30 seconds or so (and in rare instances are unavailable, as mentioned in an announcement made by the presenter at the appropriate point of the programme).

On 30 March 2011, the BBC placed more than 500 episodes from the show's archive online to listen to via iPlayer. Other episodes have since been added, both new and old.

In the early years of the BBC, programmes were broadcast live and were not usually recorded. This, in addition to the BBC's policy of only retaining a limited number of broadcasts, means very few episodes from the first 20 years of the show are known to exist; the earliest episode still in existence was broadcast on 25 April 1951 and features the actress Margaret Lockwood. Several extracts were preserved for posterity at the request of the guests, such as an extract featuring Alfred Hitchcock where he speaks about his films The Pleasure Garden (1925) and Rebecca (1940), gives his view on the changing landscape of the film industry and briefly discusses his then forthcoming film Psycho (1960).

In 2022, more than 90 recordings, previously thought to be lost, were rediscovered by the audio collector Richard Harrison. These recordings date from the period 1952 to 1988 and feature many notable celebrities of the era, including Bing Crosby, Margot Fonteyn and James Stewart. These recordings have been made available for streaming via BBC Sounds, the successor to iPlayer for audio content. In 2023, an additional episode, featuring Veronica Wedgwood, from 10 March 1973, was recovered.

== List of publications ==
- Desert Island Discs (1977, by Roy Plomley)
- Plomley's Pick (1982, by Roy Plomley)
- Desert Island Lists (1984, compiled by Roy Plomley and Derek Drescher)
- Sue Lawley's Desert Island Discussions (1990, by Sue Lawley)
- Desert Island Discs: 70 Years of Castaways (2012, by Sean Magee, foreword by Kirsty Young)
- Desert Island Discs: Flotsam & Jetsam (2012, by Mitchell Symons)
- The Definitive Desert Island Discs (2023, by Ian Gittings, foreword by Lauren Laverne)
