= Left Right and Centre =

1959 British film by Sidney Gilliat

- Directed by: Sidney Gilliat
- Written by: Val Valentine; Sidney Gilliat
- Produced by: Frank Launder; Sidney Gilliat; Leslie Gilliat
- Starring: Ian Carmichael; Alistair Sim; Patricia Bredin; Richard Wattis; Eric Barker
- Cinematography: Gerald Gibbs
- Edited by: Gerry Hambling
- Music by: Humphrey Searle
- Distributed by: British Lion Film Corporation
- Release date: 23 June 1959 (London)
- Running time: 95 minutes
- Country: United Kingdom
- Language: English

Left Right and Centre is a 1959 British satirical comedy film directed by Sidney Gilliat and starring Ian Carmichael, Patricia Bredin, Richard Wattis, Eric Barker and Alastair Sim. It was written by Val Valentine and Gilliat, and produced by Frank Launder. A political comedy, it follows the events of a by-election in a small English town.

== Plot ==
Robert Wilcot, a popular television personality, is selected as the Conservative candidate for the provincial town of Earndale in the upcoming by-election. His selection is mostly due to the influence of his uncle, Lord Wilcot, a powerful local figure. His opponent is to be Stella Stoker, a fishmonger's daughter with a degree from the London School of Economics who has been chosen to stand for the Labour Party.

Travelling up on the train to Earndale, the two candidates meet and while she quickly works out who he is, he remains ignorant of her true identity. To try to show off he begins to tell her about his selection for the seat and how he expects to win. He describes his opponent as a bluestocking. He also inadvertently reveals embarrassing details to her such as the fact that he has scarcely been to Earndale in his life and that his family once controlled the seat as a rotten borough. Once they arrive at Earndale station, he is soon made aware of his mistake. The electoral agents of both candidates are furious to discover they have been fraternising on the train.

Wilcot goes to visit his uncle, and finds him to be an eccentric who has turned his country house into a money-making operation for visiting coach parties of tourists. It appears that he has engineered Robert Wilcot's selection as a candidate in order to spark public interest in the election, boosting his own business. It is also clear that the political contest is added to by the enmity of the two electoral agents the Tory Christopher Harding-Pratt and Labour's Bert Glimmer.

Once on the stump the two candidates keep running into each other around Earndale, at one point during a factory visit leading to a shouting match. Both begin to become entranced by the other, and become convinced they are falling in love. This comes to a head during the hustings at Wilcot Hall where they are caught kissing in the maze by their respective agents. Burying the hatchet, the two agents try to foil the potential romance. Despite repeated attempts to break up the candidates they continue a covert relationship.

== Cast ==
- Ian Carmichael as Robert Wilcot
- Patricia Bredin as Stella Stoker
- Richard Wattis as Harding-Pratt
- Eric Barker as Bert Glimmer
- Alastair Sim as Lord Wilcot
- Moyra Fraser as Annabel
- Jack Hedley as Bill Hemmingway
- Gordon Harker as Hardy
- William Kendall as Pottle
- Anthony Sharp as Peterson
- George Benson as Egerton
- Leslie Dwyer as Alf Stoker
- Moultrie Kelsall as Grimsby Armfield
- Jeremy Hawk as TV interviewer
- Russell Waters as Mr. Bray
- Olwen Brookes as Mrs. Samson
- John Salew as Mayor
- Bill Shine as Basingstoke
- Erik Chitty as deputy returning officer
- Redmond Phillips as Mr. Smithson
- Irene Handl as Mrs. Maggs
- John Sharp as Mr. Reeves
- Douglas Ives as plumber
- Olaf Pooley as TV newscaster
- Hattie Jacques as woman in car
- Frederick Leister as himself
- Frank Atkinson as railway porter
- Eamonn Andrews as himself
- Gilbert Harding as himself
- Carole Carr as herself
- Josephine Douglas as herself
- Fred Griffiths as Billingsgate porter (uncredited)
- Victor Harrington as man at Wilcot Priory (uncredited)
- Philip Latham as reporter (uncredited)
- Jim O'Brady as Billingsgate porter (uncredited)

== Production ==
The factory scene was in fact Shepperton Studios, with many of the studio buildings, including its larger sound stages, forming the factory backdrop.

== Reception ==
=== Box office ===
According to Kinematograph Weekly the film performed "better than average" at the British box office in 1959. Variety confirmed this.

=== Critical ===
The Monthly Film Bulletin wrote: "Launder and Gilliat's political comedy is less a satire on the British electoral system than an attempt to find humour in the influence of television on politics. The script, eschewing parody and caricature, extracts its mild quota of laughs from the periphery of apathetic voters, inadequate supporters and commercialised stately homes. Ian Carmichael plays with gentle and polished charm, Patricia Bredin has some difficulty suggesting the same qualities in her Billingsgate fishmonger's daughter, and the rest of the cast enact their by now familiar character sketches without any great conviction or wit."

Variety wrote: "Gilliat's screenplay and direction never flag. He gets in some neat digs at television, politics and the present craze for turning aristocratic homes into peep-shows. Among the particularly hilarious sequences are a tour of the Stately Home, a romantic mixup in a maze, and a wordy match between the two candidates at a public meeting. Many of the gags and situations are irrelevant, but they all add up to a good-humored piece of nonsense."
