= Jeremy Hawk =

British actor (1918–2002)

Jeremy Hawk (20 May 1918 – 15 January 2002) was a character actor with a long career in music halls and on London's West End stage.

== Early life ==
Hawk was born Cedric Joseph Lange in Johannesburg, South Africa; his father was a matinee idol who used the name Douglas Drew, and his mother, June, of Irish origin, was of the third generation of an acting family. After his parents' divorce and his mother's subsequent marriage to a wealthy Yorkshire wool merchant, he was educated at Harrow School. Already nicknamed "Hawk" because of the shape of his nose, Lange began using the name Jeremy Hawk on entering RADA. By his first wife, Tuli, he had a daughter, Berenice Hawk; he married secondly actress Joan Heal, with whom he had another daughter, the actress Belinda Lang.

== Career ==
Hawk appeared on television as straight man to Benny Hill, Arthur Askey, Norman Wisdom and Sid Caesar as well as hosting the ITV programme Criss Cross Quiz and the junior version for children's television from 1957 to 1962. He later presented the improvisation comedy show Impromptu. He also appeared in several films, including Lucky Jim (1957). He found little other work though is remembered for a long running famous Cadbury's chocolate tropical style advert in the 1970s: "Nuts, who-le ha-zelnuts. Cadbury's take 'em and they cover 'em in chocolate". He died, aged 83, in Reading, Berkshire.

== Filmography ==
- The Goose Steps Out (1942) - A.D.C.
- The Peterville Diamond (1942) - Pierre
- Face the Music (1954) - Recording Technician
- A Stranger Came Home (1954) - Sgt. Johnson
- Mask of Dust (1954) - Martin - racer
- Who Done It? (1956) - Himself
- Lucky Jim (1957) - Bill Atkinson
- The 39 Steps (1959) - Theatre Compere (uncredited)
- Left Right and Centre (1959) - T.V. Interviewer
- Dentist in the Chair (1960) - Dental Instructor
- Dentist on the Job (1961) - Professor Lovitt
- Panic (1963) - Spike
- Mystery Submarine (1963) - Adm. Saintsbury
- Boy with a Flute (1964) Narrator.
- The Trygon Factor (1966) - Bank Manager
- Eskimo Nell (1975) - Vernon Peabody
- Stealing Heaven (1988) - Ancient Priest
- Elizabeth (1998) - Bishop #2 (final film role)
