= My Pal Bob =

British TV sitcom (1957–1958)

- Genre: Sitcom
- Written by: Bob Monkhouse; Denis Goodwin
- Starring: Bob Monkhouse
- Country of origin: United Kingdom
- Original language: English
- No. of series: 2
- No. of episodes: 10

Production
- Running time: 30 minutes

Original release
- Network: BBC Television
- Release: 17 January 1957 – 7 April 1958

My Pal Bob is a British television sitcom originally shown in ten episodes from 1957 to 1958. Written by Bob Monkhouse and Denis Goodwin, the show starred Bob Monkhouse and narrated by Denis Goodwin. All recorded episodes were thought to have been destroyed until it was discovered that Monkhouse had kept a number of episodes from shows including "My Pal Bob" in his own private archive.

== Main cast ==
- Bob Monkhouse

== Episodes ==
Series	Episode No.	Episode Title	Original Broadcast Date
1	1	Episode 1	17 January 1957
1	2	Episode 2	31 January 1957
1	3	Episode 3	14 February 1957
1	4	Episode 4	28 February 1957
2	1	Episode 1	28 January 1958
2	2	Episode 2	11 February 1958
2	3	Episode 3	25 February 1958
2	4	Episode 4	11 March 1958
2	5	Episode 5	25 March 1958
2	6	Episode 6	7 April 1958
