= Eric Barker =

English comedy actor (1912–1990)

- Barker in 1946
- Born: 12 February 1912; Thornton Heath, Surrey
- Died: 1 June 1990 (aged 78); Faversham, Kent
- Occupation: Actor
- Years active: 1916–1978
- Spouse: Pearl Hackney
- Awards: BAFTA Most Promising Newcomer to Film; 1958 Brothers in Law – Alec Blair

Eric Leslie Barker (12 February 1912 – 1 June 1990) was an English comedy actor. He is most remembered for his roles in the popular British Carry On films, although he appeared only in the early films in the series, apart from returning for Carry On Emmannuelle in 1978.

== Career ==
Eric Leslie Barker was born in Thornton Heath, Surrey on 20 February 1912, the youngest of three children. He was brought up in Croydon, Surrey, and educated at Whitgift School. He joined his father's paper merchants' company in the city but left to concentrate full-time on writing. His first novel The Watch Hunt was published when he was eighteen. He wrote short stories and plays, appearing in the latter himself and gradually turned to writing and performing lyrics, revues and sketches for stage and on radio.

He later became one of the most familiar faces in British comedy in his day. Barker gained his renewed start in show business during the Second World War, when he was part of the armed forces radio show Merry Go Round, which he helped to write. After the war the show continued, alternating between Army, Royal Air Force and Royal Navy shows. The Navy show was named Waterlogged Spa, with Barker and his wife, actress Pearl Hackney. His "Steady Barker" catchphrase and verbal stumbling over words beginning with the letter "h" became well known to audiences. The show's success led to Barker's starring in other radio shows, where he achieved a sizeable following due to his versatility at doing voices.

Barker and actor Richard Gray (left)

In the 1950s, he moved into television and films. On television he wrote and appeared in his own show, The Eric Barker Half-Hour, a comedy sketch show on the BBC. As well as his wife, the cast included Nicholas Parsons and Deryck Guyler. The show ran for three series (21 episodes) between 1951 and 1953, and was broadcast fortnightly on Wednesdays around 9.00 pm. Such was Barker's success that it led to him writing his autobiography Steady Barker in 1956.

He had already appeared as an adult in nine films, including Carry On London, a 45-minute crime short in 1937. when in 1958 he received a BAFTA as "Most Promising Newcomer" for his role as a barrister's clerk in the film Brothers in Law (1957). The award led to more film work over the next 20 years, including three St Trinians films, and four in the classic Carry On British comedy film series. He found his niche in playing variations on the busybody sticking his nose in everyone's business, or as some authority figure, Carry On Constable (1960) being a good example. He was one of only three actors (the others being Kenneth Williams and Kenneth Connor) to appear in both the first of the original series of Carry On films, Carry On Sergeant (1958), and the last, Carry On Emmannuelle (1978). Barker's other Carry On appearance was in Carry On Spying (1964).

Barker in Carry On Sergeant (1958)

In that same year (1964) he appeared in the ITC filmed series Danger Man, playing the titular character in "The Ubiquitous Mr. Lovegrove". Barker took his "authoritarian busybody" characterisation to the limit, with the twist that Mr. Lovegrove existed only in spy John Drake's semi-unconscious mind after crashing his car on his way to the airport, inspired by one of the responding ambulance operators attending the scene of Drake's accident.

Barker was also a writer and published a number of novels: Sea Breezes in the early 1930s under the pen name of Christopher Bentley and Day Gone By under his own name in 1933, as well as Golden Gimmick in 1958 published by Hodder & Stoughton. According to P. G. Wodehouse, Barker had "a real talent for humorous writing".

== Personal life ==
Barker with his wife, actress Pearl Hackney, in 1946.

Barker married the actress Pearl Hackney (28 October 1916 – 18 September 2009) with whom he often worked, though she also had a comedy career of her own. They had a daughter, Petronella Barker, in 1942, who also appeared in films and television between 1964 and 1983. Their granddaughter is the actress and musician, Abigail Rhiannedd Hopkins, born 1968.

In 1971, Barker was the subject of the British ITV television show This Is Your Life.

Barker died in Canterbury, Kent, and was buried in the churchyard of St. Mary's, Stalisfield Green, near Faversham, where he had lived for a number of years.

== Partial filmography ==
- Tom Brown's Schooldays (1916) – Arthur
- Daddy (1917) – John, as a child
- Nelson (1918) – Nelson as a child
- His Dearest Possession (1919) – Charlie Lobb
- The Toilers (1919) – Jack as a child
- Sheba (1919) – Rex Ormatroyd
- On Velvet (1938)
- The World Owes Me a Living (1945) – Chuck Rockley
- Brothers in Law (1957) – Alec Blair
- Blue Murder at St Trinian's (1957) – Culpepper Brown
- A Clean Sweep (1958) – George Watson
- Happy Is the Bride (1958) – Vicar
- Carry On Sergeant (1958) – Captain Potts
- Bachelor of Hearts (1958) – Aubrey Murdock
- Left Right and Centre (1959) – Bert Glimmer
- Carry On Constable (1960) – Inspector Mills
- Dentist in the Chair (1960) – The Dean
- Watch Your Stern (1960) – Captain David Foster
- The Pure Hell of St Trinian's (1960) – Culpepper-Brown
- Alfred Hitchcock Presents (1961) (Season 7 Episode 9: "I Spy") as Mr. Frute
- Nearly a Nasty Accident (1961) – The Air Minister
- Dentist on the Job (1961) – Colonel J.J. Proudfoot / The Dean
- Raising the Wind (1961) – Dr. Morgan Rutherford
- On the Fiddle (1961) – Doctor
- The Fast Lady (1962) – Wentworth
- On the Beat (1962) – Police Doctor
- The Mouse on the Moon (1963) – M.I.-5 Man
- Heavens Above! (1963) – Bank Manager
- Father Came Too! (1963) – Mr. Gallagher
- The Bargee (1964) – Mr. Parkes, the Foreman
- Carry On Spying (1964) – The Chief
- Gideon's Way (TV series), episode "How to Retire Without Really Working" (1964) – Robert Gresham, a petty crook and devoted husband
- Ferry Cross the Mersey (1965) – Colonel Dawson
- Those Magnificent Men in Their Flying Machines (1965) – French Postman
- Doctor in Clover (1966) – Professor Halfbeck
- The Great St. Trinian's Train Robbery (1966) – Culpepper Brown
- Three Hats for Lisa (1966) – Station Sergeant
- Maroc 7 (1967) – Professor Bannen
- Twinky (1969) – Tight Scottish Clerk
- Cool It Carol! (1970) – Signalman
- There's a Girl in My Soup (1970) – Wedding Guest (uncredited)
- That's Your Funeral (1972) – Pusher
- Carry On Emmannuelle (1978) – Ancient General (final film role)
