= Joan Heal =

English actress and singer (1922–1998)

- Born: Joan Audrey Heal; 17 October 1922; Vobster, Somerset, England, UK
- Died: 12 April 1998 (aged 75)
- Occupation: Actor
- Spouse: Jeremy Hawk
- Children: Belinda Lang

In Grab Me a Gondola, with Denis Quilley, 1956

Joan Audrey Conyers (17 October 1922 – 12 April 1998) professionally known as Joan Heal, was an English actress and singer, known for her appearances in revue in the 1940s and 1950s.

== Life and career ==
Heal was born Joan Audrey Heal, in Vobster, Somerset, and educated at Bath High School and later the Old Vic School. She made her first professional appearance as Mrs Terence in Emlyn Williams' psycho-thriller Night Must Fall in 1940 at the Garden Theatre, Bideford, after which she was in the chorus of a revue at the Saville Theatre, London. Her first prominent role in revue was at the Cambridge Theatre in Sauce Tartare in 1949. This was followed by Sauce Piquante at the same theatre in 1950. In 1951, she was in the Lyric Revue with Ian Carmichael, Dora Bryan and Graham Payn at the Lyric Theatre, Hammersmith. The show transferred to the Globe Theatre in the West End, and was followed by a sequel in 1952. After further revue work, Heal was cast in the leading role of Virginia Jones in a new British musical Grab Me a Gondola, which became, in the words of The Times "a huge and completely unexpected success". After pre-West-End performances in Windsor and Hammersmith it transferred to the West End, and ran for a total of 673 performances, until mid-1958.

Heal played at the Bristol Old Vic in 1959 as Katherina in The Taming of the Shrew. In the 1960s she joined the repertory company of the Nottingham Playhouse for two seasons. She returned to West End musicals as Madam K in Sandy Wilson 's Divorce Me, Darling!. In 1966 she appeared in her last revue, The Decline and Fall of the Entire World as Seen through the Eyes of Cole Porter at the Criterion Theatre. The last stage of her career was at the Young Vic, where she became a mother-figure to the predominantly youthful company.

In her later years, Heal suffered from multiple sclerosis. She died on 12 April 1998, aged 75. She was twice married, both times to actors: firstly to Jeremy Hawk and secondly to David Conyers. The second marriage produced one son. Both marriages ended in divorce.

== Sources ==
- Gaye, Freda, ed. (1967). Who's Who in the Theatre (fourteenth ed.). London: Sir Isaac Pitman and Sons. OCLC 5997224.
- Mander, Raymond; Joe Mitchenson (2000) [1957]. Barry Day; Sheridan Morley (eds.). Theatrical Companion to Coward (second ed.). London: Oberon Books. ISBN 978-1-84002-054-0.
