= The Pure Hell of St Trinian's =

1960 British comedy film by Frank Launder

- Official poster
- Directed by: Frank Launder
- Written by: Frank Launder; Sidney Gilliat; Val Valentine
- Produced by: Frank Launder; Sidney Gilliat
- Starring: Cecil Parker; Joyce Grenfell; George Cole; Eric Barker; Thorley Walters; Sid James
- Cinematography: Gerald Gibbs
- Edited by: Thelma Connell
- Music by: Malcolm Arnold
- Distributed by: British Lion Films (UK)
- Release date: 22 December 1960 (UK)
- Running time: 94 minutes
- Country: United Kingdom
- Language: English

The Pure Hell of St Trinian's is a 1960 British comedy film directed by Frank Launder and starring Cecil Parker, George Cole, Joyce Grenfell and Eric Barker. It was written by Launder, Sidney Gilliat and Val Valentine, and set in the fictional St Trinian's School. It was the third in a series of four films.

== Plot ==
The St Trinian's girls burn down the school building, go on trial at the Old Bailey, and are found guilty. Professor of Philosophy Canford of the University of Baghdad suggests that, rather than punishment, the girls need sympathy. He offers funds for a new school building, where with the help of noted educator Matilda Harker-Packer, the girls can be rehabilitated.

To demonstrate the positive effects the sympathetic educational approach is having on the girls Harker-Packer suggests the school present a cultural festival featuring a fashion show, a painting demonstration, and a dramatic presentation. Ministry officials Culpepper-Brown and Butters are invited. The show is a fiasco. Certain that the Minister will close the school when they present their report, Culpepper-Brown, Butters and Blackwood are crushed when the Minister explains that the fashions are due to be shown in London, a reputable gallery will exhibit the art, and the Stratford theatre will present the girls' Hamlet.

Canford suggests that he take the sixth-form girls on a cultural tour of the Greek islands, but after a series of misadventures they end up on an island in the East Arabian Sea. They are rescued and transferred to an army base in the nearest town, Makrab. The girls take over the base but a fight ensues. Things look bleak, when they hear the St Trinian's school song in the distance, followed by the arrival of the fourth-form girls in army vehicles, who smash their way into the compound.

Back in Britain, the girls are hailed as heroes.

== Cast ==
- Cecil Parker as Professor Canford
- George Cole as "Flash Harry"
- Joyce Grenfell as Sergeant Ruby Gates
- Eric Barker as Culpepper-Brown
- Thorley Walters as Butters
- Irene Handl as Headmistress Miss Harker-Packer
- Dennis Price as Gore Blackwood
- Sid James as Alphonse O'Reilly (nicknamed 'Wyatt Earp' by the girls)
- Julie Alexander as Rosalie Dawn
- Lloyd Lamble as Superintendent Kemp-Bird, the reluctant fiancé of Ruby Gates.
- Raymond Huntley as judge
- Nicholas Phipps as Major Hargreaves
- Lisa Lee as Miss Brenner
- John Le Mesurier as the Minister of Education
- George Benson as defence counsel
- Elwyn Brook-Jones as Emir
- Basil Dignam as army officer
- Cyril Chamberlain as Captain Thompson
- Michael Ripper as Eric the liftman
- Mark Dignam as prosecuting counsel
- Monte Landis as Octavius
- Warren Mitchell as tailor
- Clive Morton as V.I.P.
- Wensley Pithey as Chief Constable
- Bill Shine as usher
- Harold Berens as British Consul
- Liz Fraser as WPC Susan Partridge
- Maria Lennard as Millicent
- Dawn Beret as Jane

== Box office ==
The film was called a "money maker" at the British box office in 1961.

== Critical reception ==
The Monthly Film Bulletin wrote: "The Pure Hell of St Trinian's demonstrates that reputable producers are just as capable of turning out third-rate British farces as any mushroom growth B-picture studio. Given a script without a vestige of originality, Frank Launder's capacity as a director is revealed as correspondingly tired and easily satisfied; his film, despite a promising opening, could hardly be more shapeless or laborious. The experienced actors give embarrassing performances, and the monstrous girls themselves, uprooted from their proper environment, are left like their elders to cope as well as they can against a series of arbitrary backdrops – army encampments, desert islands, Arab market-places, that sort of thing."

Variety called it "well up to standard."

Time Out regretted that "inspiration seems to have deserted the St Trinian's scriptwriters," but noted "Some bright moments."

The Radio Times Guide to Films gave the film 2/5 stars, writing: "Bereft of Alastair Sim, the third film in the St Trinian's series ... has its moments, but sadly all too few of them. With the school reduced to smouldering ashes, mysterious child psychologist Cecil Parker takes charge of the tearaways, in league with white-slaving sea captain Sidney James. Woefully short on mayhem, the film spends too much time in the company of eventual castaways Parker and Joyce Grenfell."
