= Julie Alexander =

British model and actress (1938–2003)

- Alexander in The Pure Hell of St Trinian's (1960)
- Born: Julia Yvonne Alexander; 9 May 1938; Fulham, London, England
- Died: 31 January 2003 (aged 64); Battersea, London, England
- Occupations: Model; actress
- Height: 5 ft 4 in (163 cm)
- Spouse: Robert Breckman (m. 1979)

Julia Yvonne Alexander (9 May 1938 – 31 January 2003) was a British model and actress of the late 1950s and early 1960s known for playing glamorous roles including Rosalie Dawn in The Pure Hell of St Trinian's (1960).

== Biography ==
=== Early years ===
Born in Fulham in London as Julia Yvonne Alexander, on leaving school Alexander worked in an insurance office and then for an optician to pay for drama lessons.

=== Career ===
At 5 feet 4 inches tall, Alexander was originally a model and pin-up girl appearing in Charm and Lush and on the covers of Blighty and Carnival magazines in 1956, the Turkish magazine Hayat in 1957, Tit-Bits in 1958 and 1959 and The Weekly News in 1959 and in a number of TV commercials before moving into acting. Her television appearances included The Mythmakers (1958), ITV Play of the Week (1958), Mary in Tell It to the Marines (1959), Play Your Hunch as herself (1961), The Strange World of Gurney Slade (1960), Dahlia MacNamara in William (1962) and Lady Rosalie in three episodes of Richard the Lionheart (1962).

During her brief acting career she appeared in the films Hello London (1958), Operation Bullshine (1959), Dentist in the Chair (1960), The Pure Hell of St Trinian's (1960), The Terror of the Tongs (1961) and A Matter of WHO (1961).

=== Late years and death ===
She retired from acting in 1962 and married the theatrical chartered accountant Robert Breckman in 1979.

Alexander was diagnosed with Alzheimer's disease in 1993 at the age of 55 and was admitted to the Meadbank Nursing Centre in Battersea in London in 1997. She died there aged 64 in January 2003. She was cremated in a non-religious ceremony at Putney Vale Cemetery.

== Legacy ==
After Alexander's diagnosis the Julie and Robert Breckman Centre at the PDSA PetAid hospital in Romford was set up and funded by the couple as a living will; it opened in 1999. Robert Breckman also funds The Breckman Student Nurse Bursary for the same organisation as a tribute to his late wife. The Romford centre has a display of memorabilia from Alexander's modelling and acting career as well as a collection of specially commissioned artwork. In addition, in 2000 Julie and Robert Breckman donated the most important examples from their collection of prints by Francesco Bartolozzi as well as their collection of Staffordshire ceramics, to the Victoria and Albert Museum.

At the same time the Julie and Robert Breckman Staffordshire and Print Fund was established at the V&A for the purpose of adding to the Museum's print collection. Their donation complemented the Bartolozzi prints in the original Julie and Robert Breckman gift, as that had also included an example of a print in its original frame, Bartolozzi's 'Apotheosis of a Beautiful Female' of 1797. The Julie and Robert Breckman Prints and Drawings Gallery at the Victoria and Albert Museum opened in 2005.
