= Bob's Full House =

British TV game show (1984–1990)

- Genre: Game show
- Presented by: Bob Monkhouse
- Country of origin: United Kingdom
- Original language: English
- No. of series: 6
- No. of episodes: 117

Production
- Production location: BBC Television Centre
- Running time: 35 minutes
- Production company: BBC Television

Original release
- Network: BBC1
- Release: 1 September 1984 – 27 January 1990

Bob's Full House is a British television quiz show based on the game bingo. It aired on BBC1 from 1 September 1984 until 27 January 1990, and was hosted by Bob Monkhouse.

== Gameplay ==
Four players were given separate bingo-style cards and attempted to light up the numbers on them by answering questions. Cards had three rows of six spaces each, with one space per row already blanked out to leave 15 numbers showing; however, the numbers in the corners of each card were never blanked out. Numbers on the cards ran from 1 to 60. The winner of each round received their choice of three prizes that increased in value from one round to the next. On charity specials, each correct answer awarded £10 to a charitable cause nominated by the player who gave it, and the chosen prize at the end of each round was donated to the winner's cause.

Each episode began with a lengthy topical stand-up comedy routine from Monkhouse. Throughout the game, he and the players frequently used nicknames for the numbers, some of which became a call-and-response with the audience. For example, choosing 22 would bring a call of "Two little ducks" from Monkhouse and a "Quack, quack" from the audience.

=== Round One (Four Corners) ===
In this round, Monkhouse asked questions on the buzzer, open to all. The correct answer allowed a player to light up the number in one corner of their card, while the wrong answer caused them to become penalised, or "wallied" – in this case, unable to buzz-in on the next question. The first player to light all four corners of their card won the round.

=== Round Two (Monkhouse Master Card/The Middle Line) ===
The players were shown a board with six categories, each corresponding to a range of 10 consecutive numbers. Each player in turn called a number off their own middle row and was asked a question unopposed in the corresponding category. A correct answer lit the number, but a miss allowed any of the other three to buzz-in (described by Monkhouse as "open to others"). A correct buzz-in allowed that player to light any number on their own middle row, while a miss caused them to become wallied. If a wallied player was next in line to choose a number, they forfeited their turn; otherwise, they could not buzz-in on the next question in case of a miss. The categories were changed after every player had taken a turn, resulting in new ones being added to the board and/or previously used ones being assigned to different number ranges.

The first player to complete their middle row won the round. In addition, one number on each card was secretly designated as a "Lucky Number." If the player in control chose their own Lucky Number and responded correctly, they won a bonus prize, which was frequently revealed as part of a short comedy sketch or in connection with a worthless joke prize. (E.g. a contestant might win a bag of popcorn and an ice cream cone, then be told that they could enjoy these snacks in combination with a dozen movie tickets.) During the charity specials, a correct answer on a Lucky Number question awarded a further £50 to that player's charity.

=== Round Three (Full House) ===
Gameplay proceeded as in Round One, but the goal was now to fill in all unlit numbers on the cards. Numbers were lit starting on a player's top row and proceeding left to right, then similarly on the middle and bottom rows. The first player to complete their card won the game and advanced to the bonus round.

Any players who finished the game without winning any prizes received a hamper of gifts as a consolation prize.

== Bonus Round (Golden Card Game) ==
The player faced an electronic board laid out in the same manner as the cards used in the main game, with one space in each row marked off and numbers from 1 to 60 in the others. They had 60 seconds to answer up to 15 questions. The clock kept running on a pass or miss, but each correct answer stopped the clock and allowed the player to remove one number. Some numbers had letters hidden behind them that spelled out the name of a holiday destination, while all others added their value in pounds to a bank. If the player uncovered all the letters, they won a holiday to that destination; if not, they received a small consolation prize. Regardless of the outcome, they won all the money in the bank.

Monkhouse frequently offered subtle hints to help players who were struggling with questions, such as bleating like a goat on an astrology-related question to lead a player to the sign of Capricorn. The letters were arranged in order from left to right in each row, and a player who figured out the destination could narrow down the possible locations of the missing letters.

== Transmissions ==
=== Series ===
Series	Start date	End date	Episodes
1	1 September 1984	1 December 1984	14
2	7 September 1985	21 December 1985	16
3	6 December 1986	25 May 1987	16
4	5 September 1987	30 January 1988	21
5	3 September 1988	4 February 1989	21
6	2 September 1989	27 January 1990	21

=== Specials ===
Date	Entitle
26 December 1984	Christmas Special
8 April 1985	Easter Special
26 December 1985	Christmas Special
31 March 1986	Easter Special
27 December 1986	Christmas Special
26 December 1987	Christmas Special
24 December 1988	Christmas Special
23 December 1989	Christmas Special

== International versions ==
Country	Local name	Host	Network	Year aired
Finland	Megavisa	Jukka-Pekka Palo	Kolmoskanava; MTV3	1991–1992; 1993–1995
Germany	Bingo	Wolf-Dieter Herrmann	Sat.1	1991–1992
Germany	Kinder-Bingo	Thomas Gottschalk	Sat.1	1992
Greece	Mega Banca	Giorgos Polychroniou	Mega Channel	1992–1995
Philippines	GoBingo (unlicensed)	Arnell Ignacio	GMA	1996–1999; 2008
Portugal	Casa Cheia	Fernando Pereira (1990–1992); Carlos Ribeiro (1992-1994); Serenella Andrade (1995–1997)	Canal 1 RTP1	1990–1997
Romania	Robingo	Horia Brenciu	TVR	1993–1998
United States	Trump Card	Jimmy Cefalo	Syndication	1990–1991
Vietnam	Vui để học	Thu Hương	HTV7	2001–2002

== Video games ==
- A home computer adaptation by Domark was released in 1988 for the ZX Spectrum, Amstrad CPC, BBC Micro and Commodore 64.
