= A Matter of WHO =

1961 British film by Don Chaffey

- Directed by: Don Chaffey
- Written by: Patricia Lee; Paul Dickinson; Patricia Lee; Milton Holmes; Harold Buchman
- Produced by: Milton Holmes; Walter Shenson
- Starring: Terry-Thomas; Sonja Ziemann; Alex Nicol; Richard Briers
- Cinematography: Erwin Hillier
- Edited by: Frank Clarke
- Music by: Edwin Astley
- Production company: Foray Productions
- Distributed by: Metro Goldwyn Mayer
- Release date: 3 October 1961
- Running time: 90 minutes
- Country: United Kingdom
- Language: English

A Matter of WHO is a 1961 British comedy thriller film directed by Don Chaffey and starring Terry-Thomas, Julie Alexander, Sonja Ziemann, Alex Nicol, Richard Briers, Honor Blackman and Carol White.

A World Health Organization employee tries to trace the source of a deadly virus.

== Plot ==
Aboard an airliner flying from Nice to London, an oil driller returning from the Middle East named Cooper becomes very ill. This attracts the notice of World Health Organization self-styled "germ detective" Archibald Bannister. It turns out that Cooper's new wife, Michèle, and his business associate, Kennedy, know each other.

Bannister is reprimanded by his boss, Hatfield, for previously shutting down London Airport because of what turns out to be an ordinary rat. This time, however, Cooper is diagnosed with highly infectious smallpox. There are also outbreaks in Brussels and Zurich. Bannister suspects that all three cases were contracted from a fourth person, a carrier.

== Cast ==
- Terry-Thomas as Archibald Bannister
- Sonja Ziemann as Michèle Cooper
- Alex Nicol as Edward Kennedy
- Richard Briers as Jimmy Jamierson
- Honor Blackman as Sister Bryan
- Carol White as Beryl
- Guy Deghy as Nick Ivanovitch
- Clive Morton as Hatfield
- Martin Benson as Rahman
- Geoffrey Keen as Foster
- The John Barry Seven
- Eduard Linkers as Dr. Linkers
- Vincent Ball as Dr Blake
- Michael Ripper as Skipper
- Cyril Wheeler as Steve Cooper
- Andrew Faulds as Ralph
- George Cormack as Henry
- Bruce Beeby as Captain Brooke
- Julie Alexander as stewardess
- Barbara Hicks as Margery
- Bambi as Dog

== Production ==
It was made at MGM-British Elstree Studios with sets designed by Elliot Scott.

== Box office ==
MGM records say it lost $142,000.

== Critical reception ==
The Monthly Film Bulletin wrote: "This latest attempt to emulate Hitchcock never finds a balance between Terry-Thomas's brand of civil service comedy and the surrounding atmosphere of suspicion and peripatetic detection. The mood aimed at is closest to Hitchcock's Secret Agent [1936]; the actual measure of achievement falls far short. The germ-laden needle in a haystack which the two amateur detectives are seeking should have a magnetic attraction for the audience. As it is, a confused script and Don Chaffey's flat direction combine to produce a jaded impression of a number of TV's Interpol episodes running one into another; and Terry-Thomas's none too humorous skirmishing round the haystack ends up forcing from it nothing more deadly than a field-mouse."

Leslie Halliwell said: "Curious blend of semi-documentary with suspense and comedy; not really a starter."
