= Kate Fenton =

English novelist and former BBC radio producer (born 1954)

- Born: 14 October 1954 (age 71); Failsworth, Lancashire, England
- Occupations: Novelist; radio producer
- Years active: 1978–present
- Spouse: Ian Carmichael (m. 1992; died 2010)

Kate Fenton (born 14 October 1954) is an English novelist and former BBC radio producer. She lives near Whitby in Yorkshire.

== Background ==
Fenton was born in Failsworth, Lancashire, and studied Philosophy, Politics and Economics (PPE) at St Hilda's College, Oxford (1974–77). After leaving Oxford, she worked for a short while as a researcher in the House of Commons for a Member of Parliament.

From 1978 to 1985, she was at the BBC. Initially she was a researcher and later she became a features and documentary producer. She worked for BBC Radio Wales, the World Service and eventually Radio 4, based in London. Programmes with which she was involved included Pick of the Week and Woman's Hour. She completed her first novel in 1989. She has also written articles for The Daily Telegraph, The Mail on Sunday and Woman's Own magazine. Between her 2002 novel, Picking Up, and her 2020 novel, The Time of Her Life, she continued to write but took a break from publishing fiction.

In 1992, Fenton married the actor Ian Carmichael. They lived in North Yorkshire until his death in 2010. She later remarried, to a local doctor, according to a March 2012 page on her self-penned 'katefenton.com'.

== Books ==
- The Colours of Snow (1990)
- Dancing to the Pipers (1993)
- Lions & Liquorice (1995), published in the U.S. as Vanity and Vexation: a novel of Pride and Prejudice (Thomas Dunne Books, 2004)
- Balancing on Air (1996)
- Too Many Godmothers (2002)
- Picking Up (2002)
- The Time of Her Life (2020)
