= Dentist in the Chair =

1960 British film by Don Chaffey

- Theatrical release poster
- Directed by: Don Chaffey
- Written by: Val Guest
- Based on: novel by Matthew Finch
- Produced by: Bertram Ostrer
- Starring: Bob Monkhouse; Ronnie Stevens; Kenneth Connor; Eric Barker; Vincent Ball
- Cinematography: Reginald Wyer
- Edited by: Bill Lenny
- Music by: Ken Jones
- Distributed by: Renown Pictures Corporation
- Release date: 23 August 1960
- Running time: 84 Min (Theatrical Release) / 74 Min (DVD & TV Version)
- Country: United Kingdom
- Language: English
- Budget: £86,033

Dentist in the Chair is a 1960 British comedy film directed by Don Chaffey and starring Bob Monkhouse, Ronnie Stevens, Eric Barker and Vincent Ball. The screenplay was written by Val Guest based on the 1955 novel of the same title by Matthew Finch. Additional scenes were written by Bob Monkhouse and George Wadmore.

It was followed by the sequel Dentist on the Job (1961)

== Plot ==
David Cookson and Brian Dexter are two dental students who become mixed up in the misadventures of a thief, Sam Field, when he tries to sell them stolen dental equipment.

== Cast ==
- Bob Monkhouse as David Cookson
- Peggy Cummins as Peggy Travers
- Kenneth Connor as Sam Field
- Eric Barker as the Dean
- Ronnie Stevens as Brian Dexter
- Vincent Ball as Michaels
- Eleanor Summerfield as Ethel
- Reginald Beckwith as Mr. Watling
- Stuart Saunders as Inspector Richardson
- Ian Wallace as dentist
- Peggy Simpson as Miss Brent
- Jean St Clair as Lucy
- Rosie Lee as Maggie
- Charlotte Mitchell as woman in surgery
- Philip Gilbert as young man in surgery
- Jeremy Hawk as dental instructor
- Harry Hutchinson as porter
- Alf Dean as wrestler
- Sheree Winton as Jayne
- Julie Alexander as nurse

== Production ==
The film was based on a novel by a Liverpool dentist which was published in 1955. The book was attributed to Matthew Finch, a pseudonym. The Observer said it had "pace and gusto". The book became a best seller and led to a sequel, Teething Troubles. Finch wrote a number of other novels, approximately one a year.

Film rights were bought in 1956.

The film was one of a series of low budget comedies starring Bob Monkhouse that followed the success of Carry On Sergeant. Others included Dentist on the Job, She'll Have to Go and A Weekend with Lulu. Filming started in September 1959 and took place at Pinewood Studios over six weeks. Monkhouse later said he turned down the chance to appear in more Carry On films to make Dentist in the Chair as the latter paid him three times as much.

In January 1960 it was announced Monkhouse was working on a sequel Dentist on the Job before the original had been released.

== Reception ==
=== Box office ===
The film was successful at the British box office.Kine Weekly said the film "proved a terrific turn up" at the box office, calling it a "triumph of team work".

=== Critical ===
The Monthly Film Bulletin wrote: "An overworked comedy which tries to blend the humour of the Carry On series with the medical observation of the Doctor series. The result is as much pathetic as funny, with the majority of the jokes and situations signalling their arrival well in advance."

Kinematograph Weekly wrote "when it comes to clinical comedies or, for that matter, any other, Dentist In The Chair... can definitely hold its own. Uninhibited nonsense, it’s been cleaning up in the provinces and is currently proving that its out-of-town success wasn't a flash in the pan. The eggheads didn’t think it was funny, but the laugh’s on them."

Variety wrote: "Dentist In Chair disdains any pretension to subtlety. It hits home its comic points in a succession of ham situations, many irrelevant. An uneven cast manages to keep the fun bubbling precariously. ... The plot is eked out by a string of sequences that seem like vaude sketches. Extra dialog has been provided by Bob Monkhouse and George Wadmore, and this is mainly used by Monkhouse himself as one of the leads. Unfortunately, he points most of the patter as if unleashing a radio script. However, some of it evokes guffaws from an indulgent audience. ... Don Chaffey's direction tends to let the screenplay take care of itself but, helped by some energetic overplaying, the result is amiable minor league entertainment."

The Radio Times Guide to Films gave the film 2/5 stars, writing: "Bob Monkhouse co-wrote and stars in this unremarkable little comedy, which will only have viewers in fits if they have been subjected to laughing gas. If the flimsy plot about stolen instruments at a dental training school isn't bad enough, the ghastly gags will set your teeth on edge. Numbing the pain, however, are the willing performances of Monkhouse and Kenneth Connor. "

== Home media ==
The British Board of Film Classification gives the running time of the original theatrical release as 88 minutes, noting that it "received cuts or alterations as part of the classification process," and lists two DVD releases, Braveworld Ltd. (1991) and DD Home Entertainment (2006), as each running 75 minutes. The UK channel Talking Pictures TV has shown the film in a 74-minute version, available on its streaming service.
