= Kaleidoscope Publishing =

Kaleidoscope Publishing is a publishing house founded by Richard Down and Chris Perry, and based in the United Kingdom. It was formed in 1988 and exists to promote the appreciation of British television, including classic and cult programming. Nowadays it is run by Chris Perry and Simon Coward.

It is now part of the TV Brain website.

The organisation also runs themed archive television events, usually four times a year, which are on a not-for-profit basis with the aim of raising money for the RNLI. These events are normally held in the West Midlands area of the United Kingdom. The organisation publishes the annual Raiders of the Lost Archives list in October; and stores many TV collections including Smallfilms, the Bob Monkhouse Archive and the Illuminations collection.
