= Bob Monkhouse =

English comedian, writer and actor (1928–2003)

Bob Monkhouse OBE
- Born: Robert Alan Monkhouse; 1 June 1928; Beckenham, Kent, England
- Died: 29 December 2003 (aged 75); Eggington, Bedfordshire, England
- Education: Dulwich College
- Years active: 1952–2003
- Spouses: Elizabeth Thompson (m. 1949; div. 1970) Jacqueline Harding (m. 1973)
- Children: 3

Robert Alan Monkhouse (1 June 1928 – 29 December 2003) was an English comedian, television presenter, writer and actor. He was the host of television game shows including The Golden Shot, Celebrity Squares, Family Fortunes and Wipeout.

== Early life and career ==
Monkhouse was born on 1 June 1928 at 168 Bromley Road, Beckenham, Kent, the son of chartered accountant Wilfred Adrian Monkhouse (1894–1957) and Dorothy Muriel Monkhouse (née Hansard, 1895–1971). Monkhouse had an elder brother, John, who was born in 1922. Monkhouse's grandfather, John Monkhouse (1862–1938), was a prosperous Methodist businessman who co-founded Monk and Glass, which made custard powder and jelly. In a 2015 documentary, it was revealed that Monkhouse and his older brother suffered from physical and verbal abuse by their mother.

Monkhouse was educated at Goring Hall School in Worthing, Sussex, and Dulwich College in south London, from which he was expelled for climbing the clock tower. While still at school, Monkhouse wrote for The Beano and The Dandy and drew for other comics including Hotspur, Wizard and Adventure. He established a comics writing and art partnership with Dulwich schoolmate Denis Gifford and the two formed their own publishing company, Streamline, in the early 1950s. Among other writing, Monkhouse wrote more than 100 Harlem Hotspots erotic novelettes.

Monkhouse completed his National service with the Royal Air Force in 1948. He won a contract with the BBC after his unwitting RAF Group captain signed a letter that Monkhouse had written telling the BBC he was a war hero and that the corporation should give him an audition.

Before establishing himself as a successful writer and comedian, Monkhouse appeared on stage in London, first as Aladdin in a stage show of the same name written by S. J. Perelman and Cole Porter and then in the first London production of the musical The Boys from Syracuse (Antipholus of Syracuse) in 1963 at the Theatre Royal, Drury Lane, alongside Ronnie Corbett.

== Writing and acting success ==
Monkhouse began his adult career as a scriptwriter for radio comedy in partnership with Denis Goodwin, a fellow Old Alleynian with whom he also compèred Smash Hits on Radio Luxembourg. Aside from performing as a double act, Monkhouse and Goodwin wrote for comedians such as Arthur Askey, Jimmy Edwards, Ted Ray and Max Miller. In addition, they were gag writers for American comedians including Bob Hope, supplying jokes for British tours. Indeed, when Goodwin broke up the partnership in 1962, it was to work for Hope.

In 1956, Monkhouse was the host of Do You Trust Your Wife?, the British version of an American game show. He went on to host more than 30 quiz shows on British television. His public profile growing, Monkhouse also began appearing in comedy films, including the first of the Carry On film series, Carry On Sergeant, in 1958. He starred in Dentist in the Chair (1960) and Dentist on the Job (1961), later regretting not choosing the Carry Ons over the dental comedies. Other presenting jobs in the 1960s included Candid Camera and Sunday Night at the London Palladium.

Around 1969 he was a partner, with Malcolm Mitchell, in the Mitchell Monkhouse Agency. In the early 1970s he appeared on BBC Radio in Mostly Monkhouse with Josephine Tewson and David Jason. In 1979 he starred in US sketch comedy television series Bonkers! with the Hudson Brothers and Joan Rivers, a job he disliked.

== Stand-up comedy ==
Monkhouse was a respected stand-up comedian, known for his talent at ad-libbing. He became much in demand as an after-dinner speaker and wrote a book about the subject, Just Say a Few Words (Lennard Publishing, 1988, 1999).

He also became a favourite with impressionists. His comedy style fell out of favour in the 1980s but he came back into fashion during the 1990s, and an appearance on Have I Got News for You helped to restore his popularity.

Monkhouse's final stand-up show was performed at the Albany Comedy Club in London on 25 August 2003, four months before his death. The show was broadcast by the BBC in 2016, November 2019, April 2020 and in December 2023 to mark the 20th anniversary of his death. Among the audience were a number of British comedians invited by Monkhouse, including Reece Shearsmith, Jon Culshaw, David Walliams, Fiona Allen and Mark Steel. The show also included a rare public appearance by this time from Monkhouse's friend Mike Yarwood.

== Game shows ==
In his later years, Monkhouse was probably better known for hosting television quiz shows than for being a comedian. One of his biggest successes was The Golden Shot from July 1967 until January 1972 and again from July 1974 to April 1975. This was broadcast live for 52 weeks a year and drew up to 17 million viewers. His first tenure ended with allegations, which he denied, that he had taken bribes to include branded goods on the programme as advertisements. He returned in 1974 after subsequent presenters and comedians Norman Vaughan and Charlie Williams were found wanting.

The dozens of other shows Monkhouse presented included Celebrity Squares, Family Fortunes and Bob's Full House. Audiences regularly topped 15 million. From 1987 to 1989, he hosted three series of the revival of the talent show Opportunity Knocks, which aired as Bob Says Opportunity Knocks. He then moved to ITV to front two more game shows, Bob's Your Uncle and The $64,000 Question, neither of which was a popular success.

From 1996 to 1998, Monkhouse presented The National Lottery Live show on Saturday evenings on BBC1, for which he created the catchphrase: "I know I'm a sinner, but make me a winner!" The opening to each show would see him deliver several minutes of topical jokes and on one occasion, where his autocue failed, he improvised a new and topical routine. This talent was used in Bob Monkhouse On the Spot, a return to pure television comedy, in which audience members suggested topics and Monkhouse came up with a routine. He was also at the helm when, on 30 November 1996, the lottery machine failed live on air, causing the draw to be delayed by 50 minutes until after that night's episode of Casualty aired.

Monkhouse then returned to quizzes, taking over hosting duties on Wipeout from Paul Daniels when its studio recordings moved from London to Manchester and the show moved from primetime to daytime. Monkhouse hosted Wipeout from 1998 until a few months before his death in 2003.

== Chat show ==
After being a stalwart of chat shows, in the mid-1980s Monkhouse presented his own for the BBC, The Bob Monkhouse Show. The show lasted three series and showcased comedians of many generations. Monkhouse was criticised for sycophancy towards his guests but said that they were all heroes of his and that was how he felt about them. Monkhouse was a keen supporter of new comedy and used the show to introduce audiences to new comedians such as Kelly Monteith, Robin Williams and Jim Carrey. The format of the interviews varied between "true" chat and analysis of comedy to scripted routines in which Monkhouse would willingly play the role of the guest's stooge, as he did with Bob Hope.

On one occasion the guest was the comedian Pamela Stephenson, who, after prior arrangement with the show's producer, appeared in a series of fake plaster casts, apparently the result of accidents whilst at home. During the interview she produced a handgun and fired it on several occasions, destroying a plant pot on the set and a series of lights in the studio roof. She then presented a rocket launcher which she promptly 'fired', destroying a camera. The gun, launcher and camera were props. None of this was known to Monkhouse, who appeared genuinely frightened (but the production crew were aware).

== Film and television archive ==
An expert on the history of silent cinema and a film collector, Monkhouse presented Mad Movies in 1966. He wrote, produced, financed and syndicated the show worldwide. The show featured clips from comic silent films, many from his own private collection, some of which he had helped to recover and restore. This film collection was the cause of a court case at the Old Bailey in 1979. Having lent Terry Wogan's son a film, Monkhouse was charged with attempting to defraud film distributors of royalties, but after two years the judge decided that there was no case to answer. Many of the films in his collection were seized and not returned to Monkhouse.

In 2008, the British Film Institute was contacted by Monkhouse's daughter, Abigail, who asked if they would like to view the collection and provide some advice as to the best way of preserving it. Amongst the discoveries were many radio and TV shows long thought lost.

Amongst shows rediscovered were many featuring Monkhouse himself, including The Flip Side, a 1966 play in which he starred as a television DJ with his own late-night show, and the 1957–58 series of his comedy My Pal Bob, including an episode in which he is suspected of an extramarital affair. The archive consisted of 36,000 videotapes, going back to when Monkhouse first bought a home video recorder in 1966. His film archive began in the late 1950s.

The entire Monkhouse film and television archive is now held by Kaleidoscope, including all the material previously held by the National Film and Television Archive (NFTVA). It was catalogued and restored to digital formats for a major event at British Academy of Film and Television Arts (BAFTA) on 24 October 2009. Chris Perry, of Kaleidoscope and Kaleidoscope Publishing, said: "We are painstakingly transferring the important contents of the video tapes and restoring radio shows. There are many incredible finds, and the event [is] an exciting time for all concerned."

In his final years, Monkhouse hosted a show on BBC Radio 2 called The Monkhouse Archive in which he provided humorous links to clips of comedy acts spanning the previous 50 years.

== Honours, awards and legacy ==
In 1993 Monkhouse was appointed an Officer of the Order of the British Empire for services to entertainment.

In 1995 the British Comedy Awards gave him its Lifetime Achievement Award for Comedy, and eight years later, a few weeks before he died, the Television and Radio Industries Club awarded him a Special Award for Outstanding Contribution to Broadcasting. He first appeared on This Is Your Life in 1982 and received a second appearance on the show on 23 April 2003, just months before his death.

In a poll of fellow comedians and comedy insiders to find the Comedians' Comedian in 2005, Monkhouse was voted among the best 50 comedy acts.

In a piece written several years after Monkhouse's death, critic and satirist Michael Deacon suggested that although Monkhouse had feared that his legacy as a comedian would be limited, as many people knew him only from his decades of work as a game-show host, his style of writing and performing could be seen as influencing many contemporary British comedians, such as Jimmy Carr (whose book on comedy The Naked Jape quoted several Monkhouse jokes), Michael McIntyre, Peter Kay, John Bishop, Lee Mack and Tim Vine.

== Personal life ==
Monkhouse was married twice, first to Elizabeth Thompson on 5 November 1949. The couple separated in 1967 and divorced in 1970. His second marriage, to Jacqueline Harding, lasted until his death. He had three children from his first marriage, but only his adopted daughter survived him.

His eldest son, Gary Alan, who had cerebral palsy, lived at Naish Farm House, a residential home for the disabled in Christchurch Road, New Milton, Hampshire. He went to Saint Michael's School in Pinner and died in Braintree, Essex, in 1992, aged 40. Monkhouse devoted much time and energy to campaigning for the disabled. His other son, Simon, a stand-up poet, from whom he had been estranged for 13 years, died aged 46 from a heroin overdose in a hotel in northern Thailand in April 2001.

Monkhouse lived in a house called "Claridges" in Eggington, near Leighton Buzzard, and had a flat in London and a holiday home in Barbados.

In his autobiography, he admitted to hundreds of sexual liaisons and affairs, but claimed that he only undertook this course of action because his first wife was unfaithful. His lovers before his second marriage included the actress Diana Dors, about whose parties he later commented after her death: "The awkward part about an orgy is that afterwards you're not too sure who to thank."

Throughout his career Monkhouse had jotted down jokes, odd facts, one-liners, sketches and ideas in a series of leather-bound books, which he took with him to every television, radio, stage and nightclub appearance he made. In July 1995 two were stolen, and Monkhouse offered a £15,000 reward. They were returned after 18 months, but the thief, although arrested, was never charged. On Monkhouse's death, the books were bequeathed to Colin Edmonds. One of the joke books was intended to be repaired on The Repair Shop in 2026 but "it contained many jokes that were not appropriate" for airing.

Monkhouse was a vocal supporter of the Conservative Party for some years. He later told his friend Colin Edmonds that this may have been a mistake, but that he wanted to be associated with a winner and he knew Margaret Thatcher could not lose the 1987 general election.

== Death ==
Monkhouse was diagnosed with prostate cancer in September 2001, and he died from this illness at his home on 29 December 2003 aged 75. His widow, Jacqueline, suffered a heart attack and died in Barbados on 28 March 2008.

== Posthumous advertisement ==
On 12 June 2007, Monkhouse posthumously appeared on British TV in an advertisement promoting awareness of prostate cancer for Male Cancer Awareness Week. Using computer animation techniques and a sound-alike actor, Monkhouse was seen in a graveyard next to his own grave (though in reality he was cremated) talking about the disease seriously, interspersed with humorous asides to another camera ("What killed me kills one man per hour in Britain. That's even more than my wife's cooking."). He ended by saying, "As a comedian, I've died many deaths. Prostate cancer, I don't recommend. I'd have paid good money to stay out of here. What's it worth to you?" before walking away from his grave and disappearing.

The advertisement was made with the support of Monkhouse's estate and supported by poster campaigns, including award-winning panels displayed in London Underground trains. Money raised went to the Prostate Cancer Research Foundation.

== Partial career summary ==
Preceded by Jackie Rae	Host of The Golden Shot; 1967–1972	Succeeded by Norman Vaughan
Preceded by Charlie Williams	Host of The Golden Shot; 1974–1975	Succeeded by Programme ended
Preceded by Programme started	Host of Celebrity Squares; 1975–1979 & 1993–1997	Succeeded by Warwick Davis
Preceded by Programme started	Host of Family Fortunes; 1980–1983	Succeeded by Max Bygraves
Preceded by Paul Daniels	Host of Wipeout; 1998–2003	Succeeded by Programme ended

=== Television ===
==== As a performer or presenter ====
- Fast and Loose (1954) (with Denis Goodwin)
- Christmas Box (1955)
- The Bob Monkhouse Show (1956)
- Beat Up The Town (1957)
- Do You Trust Your Wife? (1957) (with Denis Goodwin)
- Bury Your Hatchet (1957) (with Denis Goodwin)
- My Pal Bob (1957) (with Denis Goodwin)
- What's My Line (United States) (1957)
- Royal Variety Performance (1957)
- The Bob Monkhouse Hour (1958)
- For Love Or Money (1959–1960)
- Candid Camera (1960)
- The Big Noise (1964)
- Thirty Minute Theatre: The Flip Side (1966)
- Mad Movies (1966) (writer, presenter and producer)
- Sunday Night at the London Palladium (January–March 1967)
- Half Hour Story: Bug (1967)
- The Golden Shot (1967–72, 1974–75)
- Friends In High Places (1969)
- Take Three Girls (1971)
- The Bob Monkhouse Comedy Hour (1972)
- Quick on the Draw (1974)
- Celebrity Squares (UK version of Hollywood Squares) (1975–79, 1993–97)
- I'm Bob, He's Dickie (1977) (6 TV specials) (with Dickie Henderson)
- Bonkers! (1979)
- Family Fortunes (UK version of Family Feud) (1980–83)
- The Bob Monkhouse Show (1983–86)
- Bob's Full House (1984–90)
- Bob Says Opportunity Knocks (1987–89)
- The $64,000 Question (UK version of The 64,000 Dollar Question) (1989, 1990–93)
- Bob's Your Uncle (1991–92)
- All or Nothing at All (1993)
- Gagtag (team captain, then host) (1994–1996)
- An Audience With Bob Monkhouse (1994)
- Bob Monkhouse On The Spot (1995)
- Monkhouse's Memory Masters (1995)
- The National Lottery Live (1996–98)
- Bob's Fab Ads (1996)
- Royal Variety Performance (1996)
- What a Performance (1997–2000)
- Bob Monkhouse – Over The Limit (1998)
- Bob Monkhouse On Campus (1998)
- Bob Monkhouse's 70th Birthday (1998)
- Jonathan Creek (1998)
- Wipeout (1998–2003)
- BBC New Comedy Awards (1999)
- Smash Hits Poll Winners Party (1999)
- Parkinson (2000)
- Party at the Palace (2002)
- The Royal Variety Performance (2002)
- Parkinson (2003)

==== As a writer ====
- Fast And Loose UK 1954
- Cyril's Saga UK 1957
- Early To Braden UK 1957
- My Pal Bob UK 1957
- The Bob Monkhouse Hour UK 1958
- The Big Noise UK 1964
- Mad Movies UK 1966
- The Bob Monkhouse Comedy Hour UK 1972
- I'm Bob, He's Dickie UK 1977
- Marti UK 1977
- Bonkers UK 1979
- An Audience With Bob Monkhouse UK 1994
- Bob Monkhouse On The Spot UK 1995
- Bob Monkhouse – Over The Limit UK 1998

==== As an author ====
- Monkhouse, Bob (1980). "Contributor". David Jacob's Book of Celebrities' Jokes & Anecdotes. By Jacobs, David. Robson Books. p. 108. ISBN 0860511251.
- The Book of Days, 1981, ISBN 0-09-927150-8
- Just Say a Few Words 1988 ISBN 0-7535-0908-3
- Crying with Laughter: My Life Story 1994 ISBN 0-09-925581-2
- Over the Limit: My Secret Diaries 1993–98, 1999 ISBN 0-09-979981-2

==== As a singer ====
- You Rang, M'Lord? 1988
- I Remember Natalie / In My Dream World 1968 CBS Records
- Another Time, Another Place, Another World / When I Found You 1969 CBS Records

==== As a voice actor ====
- Thunderbirds Are Go (1966)
- Rex the Runt (1998) (Johnny Saveloy in "Johnny Saveloy's Undoing")
- Aaagh! It's the Mr Hell Show (2001) (Mr Hell in all 13 episodes)

=== Radio ===
- Mostly Monkhouse
- I Think I've Got a Problem
- BBC Radio 4's Just A Minute panel game, appearing with Clement Freud, Derek Nimmo and Kenneth Williams in March 1980.
- The Monkhouse Archive, BBC Radio 2, 1997–2003

=== Films ===
- Secret People (1952) as Hairdresser
- Carry On Sergeant (1958) as Charlie Sage
- Dentist in the Chair (1960) as David Cookson
- A Weekend with Lulu (1961) as Fred Scrutton
- Dentist on the Job (1961) as David Cookson
- She'll Have to Go (1962) as Francis Oberon
- Thunderbirds Are Go (1966) as Space Navigator Brad Newman / Swinging Star Compere (voice)
- The Bliss of Mrs. Blossom (1968) as Dr. Taylor
- Simon, Simon (1970) as Photographer

=== Stand-up videos ===
- Exposes Himself (17 October 1994)
- Live And Forbidden (23 October 1995)
- Way Over The Limit (Compilation) (23 November 1998)
