= The Bob Monkhouse Hour =

British BBC TV variety series (1958–1963)

The Bob Monkhouse Hour is a British televised variety show that ran from 1958 to 1963 which was fronted by the comedian Bob Monkhouse, and featured musical stars of the day, contemporary comedians, and various other variety acts.

It was preceded by The Bob Monkhouse Show in 1956, and both were early vehicles for the comedian whose first break had been an appearance in Carry On Sergeant in 1958, the first of the popular series of films.
