= Dentist on the Job =

1961 British comedy film by C. M. Pennington-Richards

- Directed by: C. M. Pennington-Richards
- Written by: Hugh Woodhouse; Hazel Adair; Additional material by Bob Monkhouse
- Produced by: Bertram Ostrer
- Starring: Bob Monkhouse; Ronnie Stevens; Kenneth Connor; Shirley Eaton
- Cinematography: Stephen Dade
- Edited by: Bill Lenny
- Music by: Ken Jones
- Production company: Bertram Ostrer Productions
- Distributed by: Angelo-Amalgamated Film Distributors
- Release date: June 1961
- Running time: 88 minutes
- Country: United Kingdom
- Language: English

Dentist on the Job (U.S. title Get On with It!) is a 1961 British comedy film directed by C. M. Pennington-Richards, and starring Bob Monkhouse, Kenneth Connor, Ronnie Stevens and Eric Barker It is the sequel to Dentist in the Chair (1960), and was co-written by Hugh Woodhouse and Hazel Adair.

== Plot ==
Colonel Proudfoot of Proudfoot Industries aims to entice a couple of dentists to advertise "Dreem", a revolutionary type of toothpaste, but he knows that if the dentists learn that they are part of an advertising campaign, they will be struck off. His cousin, the director of a Dental School, sees his chance to rid the field of dentistry of two newly qualified incompetents David Cookson and Brian Dexter. However, once employed by Proudfoot, they set about improving on Dreem's terrible formula, and accidentally succeed in creating a much better toothpaste. Their attempts to convince Proudfoot of its merits are foiled by Proudfoot's assistant, Macreedy.

They then read a newspaper article about the forthcoming launch of a rocket from a British base carrying a satellite which will continuously broadcast a taped message of peace from the President of the United States, and conceive a plan. They record an impromptu commercial for the new formula Dreem and, with the help of an ex-convict friend Sam Field and actress Jill Venner, manage to smuggle it aboard the rocket in place of the President's speech, guaranteeing Proudfoot years of free advertising. The resulting publicity ensures the product's success and the pair are promoted.

== Cast ==
- Bob Monkhouse as David Cookson
- Kenneth Connor as Sam Field
- Ronnie Stevens as Brian Dexter
- Shirley Eaton as Jill Venner
- Eric Barker as Colonel J.J. Proudfoot / The Dean
- Reginald Beckwith as Mr. Duff
- Richard Wattis as Macreedy
- Charles Hawtrey as Mr. Roper
- Richard Caldicot as Prison Governor
- Cyril Chamberlain as Director
- David Horne as Admiral Southbound
- Graham Stark as sourfaced man
- Charlotte Mitchell as Mrs Burke
- Arthur Mullard (uncredited)
- Andria Lawrence (uncredited)

== Critical reception ==
The Monthly Film Bulletin wrote: "Witless farce, with seaside-postcard jokes and characters (Sour-Faced Man, Cheeky Brunette, Miss Figg, etc.) and an almost pre-adolescent prurience. A few sequences score hits at the expense of commercials and advertising, but they are obvious hits at obvious targets. The film moves at a fair pace, except when a laugh line is being heavily underlined; but its nonsense is for the most part dispiriting."

The Radio Times Guide to Films gave the film 2/5 stars, writing: "A year after cutting his teeth on Dentist in the Chair, Bob Monkhouse returned in this disappointing sequel with a script that's so full of cavities you'll soon be wincing with pain and crying out for laughing gas. Newly qualified Monkhouse beams his way through a series of gags that could easily have been extracted from the Doctor in the House [1954] reject file."

== Legacy ==
The BBFC censor card, studio logos, opening credits and a brief portion of the opening scene are added to the start of Monty Python and the Holy Grail (1975) on its special edition DVD. The clip ends with a spluttering, unseen "projectionist" realising he has played the wrong film. A "slide" then appears urging the audience to wait while the operator changes reels.
