= Denis Goodwin =

British writer (1929–1975)

Denis Ian Goodwin (19 July 1929 – 26 February 1975) was a radio and television comedy scriptwriter and actor, best known for his writing partnership with Bob Monkhouse, with whom he also compèred the Smash Hits programme on Radio Luxembourg.

Goodwin was born in London and attended Dulwich College at the same time as Monkhouse, although there is no evidence that the two met at school. In 1944, his father Laurence Goodwin was killed by a V-1 flying bomb ("doodlebug") while waiting at a bus stop in South London. In 1948, while working at a department store, Goodwin approached Monkhouse and they formed a writing and comedy partnership that lasted for fourteen years.

Goodwin and Monkhouse wrote scripts for comedians such as Derek Roy, Ted Ray and Arthur Askey. Eventually they were given their own television series, Fast and Loose (1954), which they co-wrote and in which they both appeared. However, Goodwin lacked Monkhouse's talent for improvisation and was less assured as a performer.

His creative partnership with Monkhouse gradually disintegrated and finally came to an end in 1962 when he was offered work in the US on Bob Hope's gag writing team. However, Goodwin was unable to cope with the fast-paced life in America and returned to England. After returning to the UK he was the scriptwriter for Bright's Boffins (1970) and in 1974 wrote shows for Max Bygraves and David Frost.

He was married twice: his first marriage was to Barbara (1956) with whom he had two children — Jeremy (1958) and Suki (1960). They divorced in 1967 and in 1971 he married Jane Cappleman.

In 1968, he was convicted of shoplifting from a West End shop and fined £70.

In 1975, Goodwin died by suicide by means of an overdose of sleeping tablets, aged 45.
