= Dennis Barker =

British journalist (1929–2015)

- Born: 21 June 1929; Lowestoft, Suffolk, England
- Died: 2 March 2015 (aged 85)
- Occupation: Journalist
- Spouse: Sarah Alwyn (m. 1986)

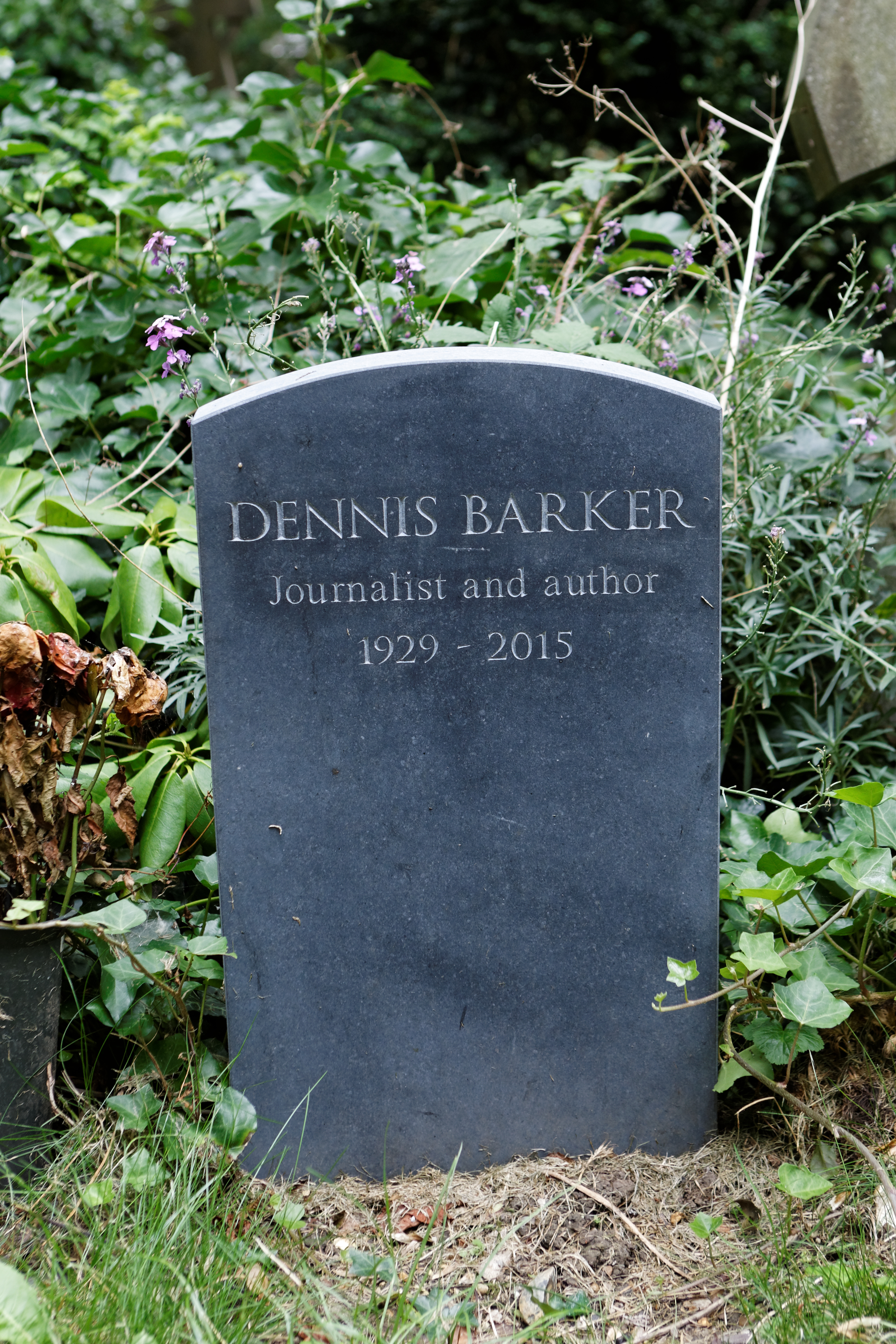
Barker's grave in Highgate Cemetery.

Dennis Barker (21 June 1929 – 2 March 2015) was a British journalist.

== Early life and career ==
Born at Lowestoft, Suffolk, son of company director George Barker and Gertrude (née Seeley), Barker and his mother escaped the heavy bombing of Lowestoft during the Second World War in favour of a cottage at Beaconsfield, Buckinghamshire; he would attend six schools over the next six years. On leaving school he went into local and regional journalism, first as a reporter and subeditor for the Suffolk Chronicle and Mercury in Ipswich, then the East Anglian Daily Times and its counterpart the Ipswich Evening Star, where he wrote features and served as theatre critic. He subsequently moved to the Express & Star in Wolverhampton, again as reporter and theatre critic, only remaining in the latter role until being banned from local theatres because of critical reviews he had written.

== Guardian career ==
From 1963, Barker spent much of his career at The Guardian, as a reporter and feature writer. He left the staff in 1991. After his retirement, he concentrated on writing obituaries for the newspaper.

As many of his obituary pieces were prepared in advance of the subjects' deaths, articles by Barker continue to be published in The Guardian, years after his death in 2015.

== Personal life ==
In 1986, aged 57, Barker married Guardian colleague Sarah Alwyn. Their daughter Ellie was born in 1993.
