= Inquest (disambiguation) =

An inquest is a judicial investigation or inquiry.

Inquest may also refer to:

- Inquest (charity), a UK charity concerned with deaths in custody
- Inquest (play), a 1931 play written by Michael Barringer
  - Inquest (1931 British film), based on the play
  - Inquest (1939 film), based on the play
- Inquest (1931 German film), a German film directed by Robert Siodmak
- The Inquest a short story by Stanislaw Lem, see Inquest of Pilot Pirx
- Inquest: The Warren Commission and the Establishment of Truth, 1966 book published by Edward Jay Epstein

== See also ==
- Da Vinci's Inquest, a long-running Canadian drama
- InQuest Gamer, a discontinued monthly magazine for game reviews and news
