= 1932 in British music =

This is a summary of 1932 in music in the United Kingdom.

== Events ==
- 7 October – The London Philharmonic Orchestra, recently founded by Thomas Beecham and Malcolm Sargent, gives its first public concert.
- date unknown – Henry Hall becomes Director of the BBC Dance Orchestra.

== Popular music ==
- "Ain't it grand to be blooming well dead?" w. Leslie Sarony
- "The Flies Crawled Up The Window" w.m. Douglas Furber & Vivian Ellis
- "Love Is The Sweetest Thing" w.m. Ray Noble
- "Mad About the Boy" w.m. Noël Coward
- "What More Can I Ask?" w. A. E. Wilkins m. Ray Noble

== Classical music: new works ==
- Arnold Bax
  - Concerto for Cello and Orchestra
  - Sinfonietta
  - Sonata No. 4, for piano
  - Summer Music, for orchestra (revised version)
  - Symphony No. 5
  - "Watching the Needleboats", for voice and piano (text by James Joyce)
- Arthur Benjamin – Violin Concerto
- Arthur Bliss – A Colour Symphony (revised)
- Arnold Cooke – Harp Quintet
- Gustav Holst
  - "If 'twer the Time of Lilies", for two-part choir and piano, H187 (words by Helen Waddell)
  - Jazz-Band Piece
  - Jig, for piano, H179
- John Ireland – A Downland Suite
- Cyril Rootham – Symphony No 1 in C minor
- Michael Tippett – String Trio in B Flat
- Ralph Vaughan Williams – Magnificat for contralto, women's chorus, and orchestra
- William Walton – 3 Songs to Poems by Edith Sitwell
- Grace Williams
  - Suite for orchestra
  - Two Psalms for contralto, harp and strings

== Opera ==
- Alfred Reynolds – Derby Day (with libretto by A. P. Herbert)

== Film and Incidental music ==
- John D. H. Greenwood – After Office Hours
- Louis Levy – White Face

== Musical theatre ==
- 16 September – Words and Music, a London revue by Noël Coward, opens at the Adelphi Theatre.

== Musical films ==
- Carmen, directed by Cecil Lewis, starring Marguerite Namara and Thomas F. Burke
- For the Love of Mike, directed by Monty Banks, starring Bobby Howes, Constance Shotter and Arthur Riscoe
- Goodnight, Vienna, directed by Herbert Wilcox, starring Jack Buchanan, Anna Neagle and Gina Malo
- Little Waitress, directed by Widgey R. Newman, starring Claude Bailey and Moore Marriott
- The Maid of the Mountains, directed by Lupino Lane, starring Nancy Brown and Harry Welchman

== Births ==
- 3 January – Johanna Peters, operatic mezzo-soprano (died 2000)
- 12 January – Des O'Connor, comedian, singer and television host (died 2020)
- 19 January – Russ Hamilton, English singer-songwriter (died 2008)
- 23 January – Cyril Davies, blues musician (died 1964)
- 29 January – Myer Fredman, British-Australian conductor (died 2014)
- 26 February – Jean Allister, opera singer (died 2012)
- 31 March – John Mitchinson, operatic tenor
- 19 May
  - John Barnes, saxophonist and clarinet player
  - Alma Cogan, singer (died 1966)
- 21 May – Robert Sherlaw Johnson, pianist and composer (died 2000)
- 27 June – Hugh Wood, composer
- 16 July – John Chilton, jazz trumpeter (died 2016)
- 31 August – Roy Castle, actor, musician and singer (died 1994)
- 11 September – Ian Hamer, jazz trumpeter (died 2006)
- 18 September – Maureen Lehane, operatic mezzo-soprano (died 2010)
- 19 September – Lol Coxhill, jazz saxophonist (died 2012)
- 15 November – Petula Clark, singer, actress, and songwriter
- 26 December – Clive Westlake, songwriter (died 2000)

== Deaths ==
- 28 January – Poldowski, Belgian-born British pianist and composer, 52
- 3 March – Eugen d'Albert, Scottish-born German pianist and composer, 67
- 14 May – John Hughes, composer of Cwm Rhondda
- 22 July – Hugh Blair, organist and composer, 67
- 21 August – Frederick Corder, composer and music teacher, 80
- 21 September – William Herbert Scott, church composer and hymn-writer, 70
- 23 November – Percy Pitt, organist and conductor, 62
- 4 December – Mona McBurney, pianist, teacher and composer, 70
- 10 December – Percy Fletcher, composer, 52

== See also ==
- 1932 in British television
- 1932 in the United Kingdom
- List of British films of 1932
