= Nightmare Movies =

- Author: Kim Newman
- Language: English
- Subject: film criticism
- Published: 1985 (Proteus Books)
- Publication place: United Kingdom
- Media type: Print
- Pages: 160 pages
- ISBN: 978-0862762162

Nightmare Movies is a non-fiction book about horror films by British critic and novelist Kim Newman. It was first published in 1985 and had later editions published in 1988, 1989, and 2011. The initial printing was 160 pages, but was expanded to 633 pages.

== Publication history ==
Proteus Books published the first edition, Nightmare Movies: Wide Screen Horror since 1968, in 1985. It was followed by an expanded 1988 edition, subtitled A Critical History of the Horror Film 1968-1988, published by Bloomsbury Publishing, and a 1989 edition published in the United States by Crown Publishing Group. In 2011, Bloomsbury released a new edition, Nightmare Movies: Horror on Screen Since the 1960s, that includes films released since the previous publication. This edition is 633 pages.

== Reception ==
The 2011 edition was reviewed by several critics. Joseph Aisenberg of Bright Lights Film Journal wrote that Newman's opinions, presented facetiously and shallowly, keep readers from taking them too seriously while entertaining them with his enthusiasm. Aisenberg criticizes Newman's take on Brian De Palma and says that Newman is at his best when describing individual films. Barry Forshaw of The Independent wrote that "it's hard to think of a more persuasive advocate for this much-despised art form". Julian White of Starburst rated it 8/10 stars and said that although it focuses too much on trend-setters at the expense of lesser-known films, it is "a must for horror buffs". Ian Berriman of SFX wrote that it "stands alongside David Pirie's A Heritage of Horror in the small category of essential books on horror cinema". Dejan Ognjanovic of Twitch Film called it "your ultimate guide to modern horror cinema".
