= Dangerous Seas =

1931 British film by Edward Dryhurst

- Julie Suedo in the film
- Directed by: Edward Dryhurst
- Written by: Edward Dryhurst
- Produced by: Edward G. Whiting
- Starring: Julie Suedo; Sandy Irving; Charles Garry
- Production company: Edward G. Whiting Productions
- Distributed by: Filmophone
- Release date: March 1931
- Running time: 53 minutes
- Country: United Kingdom
- Language: English

Dangerous Seas is a 1931 British crime film directed and written by Edward Dryhurst and starring Julie Suedo, Sandy Irving and Charles Garry. It was made as a quota quickie.

== Plot ==
Penwardine, an old fisherman reformed smuggler, refuses to lend his boat to Sunny Bantick for an illicit cargo pickup. Bantick gets Penwardine drunk and uses blackmail to secure his cooperation. Meanwhile, Penwardine's daughter, Nan, falls in love with Stanford, a local Excise officer. While out at sea approaching the contraband, a defiant Penwardine turns on Bantick, who retaliates by strapping Penwardine to the ship's mast. Having set out in another boat to warn her father using smoke signals, Nan is forced to jump into the open water when her vessel accidentally catches fire. Fortunately, both Nan and her father are rescued by Stanford. Upon learning that Bantick accidentally fell overboard and drowned during the chaos, Stanford agrees not to prosecute Penwardine, ensuring a happy resolution.

== Cast ==
- Julie Suedo as Nan Penwardine
- Sandy Irving as Captain Muddle
- Charles Garrey as Penwardine
- Gerald Rawlinson as Stanford
- Wallace Bosco as Sunny Bantick
- Gladys Dunham as Polly

== Reception ==
Kine Weekly wrote: "Charmimg Cornish scenery makes the most of a somewhat unconvincing tale of smuggling. Direction is only fair, but a spirit of good-tempered fun, largely due to the acting, and a moderately thrilling climax at sea assist the attraction of this quota picture. ... Julie Suedo is rather too refined for a fisherman's daughter but has a charming appearance."

The Daily Film Renter wrote: "This picture, although a modest production, has much to recommend it; the scenes are well chosen, and many beautiful shots of the Cornish coast and countryside are depicted. Charles Garrey ably portrays the old fisherman, supported by Julie Suedo as Nan. There are some slight comedy incidents, in which Gerald Rawlinson figures, providing welcome light relief."
