= The Professor (comic) =

Italian comic series

The Professor is an independent Italian comic series in the horror, thriller, and adventure genres. It was created by Andrea Enrico Corbetta with contributions from various writers, artists, and editors.

== Overview ==
The narrative follows Benjamin Lowe. He is 40-years-old man of Jewish origin and he is a professor of occult sciences and esotericism at University College London whose adventures unfold in late 19th-century Victorian London. The series includes both a historical setting and supernatural elements, with Lowe fighting monsters in a battle between good and evil. The series draws strong inspiration from classic British horror cinema, especially the works of Hammer Film Productions.

== Publication history ==
The series made its debut in 2016 at the Conference Hall of Villa Devoto in Rapallo, on the occasion of the International Cartoonists Festival known as Rapallonia Comics.

=== First series (2016–2017) ===
The first series, released in pocket format and distributed across Italian newsstands, consists of six issues published by Erredi Grafiche Editoriali beginning in 2016.

=== Relaunch and second series (2021–2026) ===
In 2020, the project was relaunched via a crowdfunding campaign started on the Facebook group with the slogan "The Professor wants you!".

The second series, which began with "Nistarim", is structured as a trilogy and inspired by the Franco-Belgian comics format. It features radical changes compared to the newsstand series, starting from the 30x21 cm format and the French-style page layout grid, up to the partial reboot of the character. The publication began in 2021 and the stories from this series have also appeared in the weekly magazine Lanciostory, a weekly comic book magazine founded in 1975. The trilogy comprises the following titles: "Nistarim", "La Notte del Maleficio" and "Ruse de Guerre".

== Characters ==
The character was initially conceived by Corbetta, in 1995 but was not fully realized until over twenty years later. Initially inspired by Van Helsing (Dracula's antagonist), the character was influenced/contaminated by figures such as Sherlock Holmes and Doctor Who. The protagonist's appearance is deliberately modeled on the actor Peter Cushing, noted both for his Hammer films and his portrayal of Grand Moff Tarkin in Star Wars.

== Production ==
The series has involved numerous artists. Illustrators include Andrea Cuneo, Paolo d'Antonio, Germano Giorgiani, Riccardo Innocenti, and Francesco Mobili. Writers include Cristiana Astori, Giulia De Carlo, Roberto Leoni, Carlo A. Martigli, and Giancarlo Marzano.

Since 2017, veteran comic writer and editor Roberto Leoni has served as a leading figure in the creative direction of the project.

== Issues ==
=== First series (2016–2017) ===
Six standalone stories forming part of a larger narrative arc.

No.	Title	Year	Creative Direction	Writer(s)	Artist(s)	Cover
0	—	2016	Andrea Corbetta	Giancarlo Marzano	Andrea Cuneo	Andrea Corbetta
1	Golem	2016	Andrea Corbetta	Carlo A. Martigli	Paolo d'Antonio	Andrea Corbetta
2	Revenant	2016	Andrea Corbetta	Giancarlo Marzano	Francesco Mobili	Andrea Corbetta
3	Follia	2017	Andrea Corbetta	Cristiana Astori	Riccardo Innocenti	Andrea Corbetta
4	Sirena	2017	Andrea Corbetta	Giulia De Carlo; Roberto Leoni	Germano Giorgiani	Andrea Corbetta
5	Troll	2017	Andrea Corbetta	Giancarlo Marzano	Paolo d'Antonio	Andrea Corbetta
6	Polvere	2017	Andrea Corbetta	Cristiana Astori	Francesco Mobili	Andrea Corbetta

=== Second series (2021–2025) ===
Planned as a trilogy.

No.	Title	Year	Creative Direction	Writer & Editor	Artist(s)	Cover	Lanciostory publication
1	Nistarim	2021	Andrea Corbetta	Roberto Leoni	Riccardo Innocenti	Francesco Mobili; Francesco Tomaselli; Giuliano Piccininno	n. 2455–2458
2	La notte del maleficio	2023	Andrea Corbetta	Roberto Leoni	Paolo Massagli; Dario Iannaccone	Paolo Massagli; Francesco Tomaselli; Toni Viceconti	n. 2574–2576
3	Ruse de guerre	2026	Andrea Corbetta	Roberto Leoni	Dario Iannaccone	Lorenzo Scipioni; Toni Viceconti	

== See also ==
- Italian comics
- Hammer Film Productions
- Peter Cushing
- Dylan Dog
- Lucca Comics & Games
