= The Dream Doctor =

1936 British film by Widgey R. Newman

- Opening titles
- Directed by: Widgey R. Newman
- Starring: Julie Suedo; Sydney Monckton; Margaret Yarde; Yvonne Murray; Leo Genn
- Production company: Widgey R. Newman Productions
- Distributed by: MGM
- Release date: September 1936
- Running time: 41 minutes
- Country: United Kingdom
- Language: English

The Dream Doctor is a 1936 British short drama film directed by Widgey R. Newman (as R. W. Lotinga) and starring Leo Genn, Sydney Monckton and Yvonne Murray. The film was a quota quickie produced by the independent producer Newman for distribution by the Hollywood studio MGM.

== Plot ==
A psychic gypsy interprets the dreams of a doctor's patients.

== Cast ==
- Julie Suedo as gypsy
- Sydney Monckton as Sir Henry Martin
- Margaret Yarde as Lady Avon
- Yvonne Murray as patient
- Peter Cousins
- Thelma Sheehan
- Leo Genn as Joseph
- Jennifer Skinner

== Reception ==
The Daily Film Renter wrote: "It must be confessed a number of the interpretative diagnoses are more than a trifle hard to swallow, while production values err on the side of crudity. Patrons interested in the science dealt with by the subject may possibly find their attention mildly gripped. Julie Suedo gives a pleasing performance as the gipsy girl, although the role calls more for a commentator than an actress."

Kine Weekly wrote: "Little more than a penny dream book picturised, the film will make no appeal to intelligent audiences, but such is the fascination of the subject matter, particularly with the credulous and womenfolk, that it may get over in small halls as a quota second feature."

== Home media ==
The film is included on the DVD The Renown Vintage Sci-Fi Collection Volume One.
