= I Didn't Do It =

I Didn't Do It may refer to:

- I Didn't Do It (film), a 1945 British comedy crime film
- I Didn't Do It (TV series), a 2014 American television series
- "I Didn't Do It", a Bart Simpson catchphrase from The Simpsons episode "Bart Gets Famous"

== See also ==
- I Just Didn't Do It, a 2007 Japanese film
