= Billy Caryll and Hilda Mundy =

British comedy duo (Caryll: 1892–1953; Mundy: 1893–1968)

Billy Caryll
- Billy Caryll and Hilda Mundy
- Born: William Francis Clark; December 23, 1892; Southwark, London, England
- Died: February 15, 1953 (aged 60); Sussex, England
- Occupation: Comedian
- Partner: Hilda Mundy

Hilda Mundy
- Born: Hilda Madeline Mundy; June 14, 1893; London, England
- Died: November 14, 1968 (aged 75); England
- Occupation: Comedian
- Spouse: Billy Caryll

Billy Caryll and Hilda Mundy were a British comedy duo who performed in variety shows and films, and on BBC radio, between the early 1920s and late 1940s. They never married though they were a couple until Billy Caryll died.

== Careers ==
Billy Caryll (born William Francis Clark; 23 December 1892 – 15 February 1953) was born in Southwark, London. In 1920, he became the comedy partner of Hilda Madeline Mundy (14 June 1893 – 14 November 1968), also from London, and together they developed a popular sketch comedy act, starting in 1921. Inspired by a minor lovers' tiff that they had had, Caryll took the role of a drunken husband and Mundy his domineering wife. Many regarded Caryll as one of the best onstage "drunk" performers.

In 1931 and 1932 they took part in the first "Crazy Week" shows at the London Palladium, with Nervo and Knox, Naughton and Gold, Flanagan and Allen, and 'Monsewer' Eddie Gray, though Caryll and Mundy did not take part in the Crazy Gang that developed out of the shows. Caryll also acted in the films Amateur Night in London (1930) and Marry Me (1932). They also made several recordings of their routines, released on the "Broadcast Super Twelve" label (owned by the American Record Corporation) as "Scenes of Domestic Bliss".

For contractual reasons, Caryll and Mundy did not broadcast on the BBC until 1936, but they then began appearing regularly on radio variety shows. In 1938, they had their own radio show, which came to be billed as The Neemos, in which they presented their usual argumentative characters in sketches, interspersed with music, including songs by Sam Costa. The shows also featured Maurice Denham as "His Nibs" Little Reggie. Caryll and Mundy also featured together in the 1937 film, Calling All Ma's, and the following year in Lassie from Lancashire.

During the Second World War, Caryll and Mundy continued to tour. They appeared on radio variety shows, and in the 1945 George Formby film I Didn't Do It.

Caryll died in Sussex in 1953, aged 60, after having a leg amputated following a long illness. Mundy died in 1968, aged 75.
