= Wally Patch =

English actor and comedian (1888–1970)

- Born: Walter Sydney Vinnicombe; 26 September 1888; Willesden, Middlesex, England
- Died: 27 October 1970 (aged 82); Hillingdon, Middlesex, England
- Occupations: Film, television & stage actor, comedian
- Years active: 1926–1970

Walter Sydney Vinnicombe (26 September 1888 – 27 October 1970), known as Wally Patch, was an English actor and comedian. He worked in film, television and theatre.

== Early life and career ==
Vinnicombe was born in Willesden, Middlesex and began working on the music hall stages in 1912 and at regular theatres in 1938 at the Theatre Royal, Drury Lane. His first film appearance was in 1928, and went on to appear in 213 other films. On stage he enjoyed success in the 1950 play Reluctant Heroes, the first of the Whitehall farces. He worked up to his death, with his last television appearance in the comedy Doctor in the House in 1970.

== Partial filmography ==
- Blighty (1927) – Drill Sergeant
- Boadicea (1927) – Officer in Roman Army (uncredited)
- The King's Highway (1927) – Police Chief
- Carry On (1927) – Andrews
- The Luck of the Navy (1927) – Stoker Clark
- The Guns of Loos (1928) – Sergeant
- Shooting Stars (1928) – Property Man
- Balaclava (1928) – Trooper Strang
- A Reckless Gamble (1928) – Wally
- You Know What Sailors Are (1928) – Seaman
- High Treason (1929) – Peace League Commissionaire (uncredited)
- The Adventures of Dick Turpin (1929) – Jonathan Wild
- Warned Off (1930) – Miles
- The Great Game (1930) – Joe Miller
- Kissing Cup's Race (1930) – Bookie
- The Sport of Kings (1931) – Panama Pete
- The Skin Game (1931) – Van Driver (uncredited)
- Tell England (1931) – Sergeant
- Never Trouble Trouble (1931) – Bill Hainton
- The Great Gay Road (1931) – Joe
- Shadows (1931) – Cripps
- Castle Sinister (1932) – Jorkins
- Heroes of the Mine (1932) – Bob
- Here's George (1932) – Foeman
- Illegal (1932) – The Bookie (uncredited)
- The Lucky Number (1932) – Bookmaker at Greyhound Stadium (uncredited)
- The Good Companions (1933) – Fred – Driver's Mate
- The Crime at Blossoms (1933) – Palmer
- Don Quixote (1933) – Gypsy King
- Falling for You (1933) – Publican (uncredited)
- Dora (1933 short) – PC William Petty
- Britannia of Billingsgate (1933) – Harry
- The Private Life of Henry VIII (1933) – Butcher in Kitchen (uncredited)
- Channel Crossing (1933) – Sailor (uncredited)
- Trouble (1933) – Chief Steward
- Marooned (1933) – Wilson
- Friday the Thirteenth (1933) – Bookmaker (uncredited)
- Up for the Derby (1933) – Bert Davis, Bookie (uncredited)
- Sorrell and Son (1933) – Buck
- The Scotland Yard Mystery (1934) – Detective Sergeant George
- The Fire Raisers (1934) – Price the Trainer (uncredited)
- Those Were the Days (1934) – Insp. Briggs
- Tiger Bay (1934) – Wally
- The Man I Want (1934) – Crook
- Passing Shadows (1934) – Sergeant
- Orders Is Orders (1934) – Regimental Sergeant Major
- Music Hall (1934) – Fred
- What Happened to Harkness? (1934) – Bullett
- Falling in Love (1934) – Boatman (uncredited)
- Virginia's Husband (1934) – Police Sergeant
- Badger's Green (1934) – Mr. Rogers
- The Scoop (1934) – Harry Humphries
- Crazy People (1934)
- A Glimpse of Paradise (1934) – Harry
- The Old Curiosity Shop (1934) – George (uncredited)
- The Perfect Flaw (1934) – Bert
- Once in a New Moon (1934) – Syd Parrott
- Borrow a Million (1934) – Bodgers
- The Public Life of Henry the Ninth (1935) – Landlord
- Brewster's Millions (1935) – Bookmaker (uncredited)
- Street Song (1935) – Wally
- That's My Uncle (1935) – Splinty Woods
- Dandy Dick (1935) – Police Constable Topping (uncredited)
- Death on the Set (1935) – Sergeant Crowther
- Where's George? (1935) – Ted Sloane
- Old Faithful (1935) – Joe Riley
- While Parents Sleep (1935) – Taxi Driver
- Crime Unlimited (1935) – Andrew Purvis (uncredited)
- No Monkey Business (1935) – Stage Hand (uncredited)
- Get Off My Foot (1935) – Tramp
- Off the Dole (1935) – Detective Brown
- Marry the Girl (1935) – Bookmaker
- His Majesty and Company (1935) – Bert Hicks
- Charing Cross Road (1935) – Langdon's Assistant (uncredited)
- Public Nuisance No. 1 (1936) – Hotel Doorman (uncredited)
- Ticket of Leave (1936) – Sergeant Knott
- Twice Branded (1936) – James Kaley (uncredited)
- A Wife or Two (1936)
- On Top of the World (1936) – Cardsharper
- Excuse My Glove (1936) – Hurricane Harry
- A Touch of the Moon (1936) – Police Constable
- Prison Breaker (1936) – Villars
- Apron Fools (1936)
- King of the Castle (1936) – Trout
- Not So Dusty (1936) – Dusty Gray
- The Interrupted Honeymoon (1936) – Police Constable
- The Man Who Could Work Miracles (1936) – Supt. Smithells
- Dusty Ermine (1936) – Thug (uncredited)
- Luck of the Turf (1936) – Bill Harris
- Hail and Farewell (1936) – Sergeant Major
- Men Are Not Gods (1936) – Gallery Attendant
- The Scarab Murder Case (1936) – Inspector Moor
- You Must Get Married (1936) – Chief Blow
- The Price of Folly (1937) – Man with Tip
- The Street Singer (1937) – Policeman
- Busman's Holiday (1937) - Jeff Pinkerton
- The High Command (1937) - Crawford
- Farewell Again (1937) - Sgt. Maj. Billings
- The Man Who Made Diamonds (1937) - Alf Higgins
- Night Ride (1937) - Alf Higgins
- Talking Feet (1937) – (uncredited)
- Doctor Syn (1937) – Collyer's Bo'sun
- Missing, Believed Married (1937) – Flatiron Stubbs
- Captain's Orders (1937) – Johnstone
- Sam Small Leaves Town (1937) – Bus Passenger (uncredited)
- Holiday's End (1937) – Sergeant Yerbury
- Owd Bob (1938) – Bookmaker – Unlucky Joe – (US title: 'To the Victor')
- Bank Holiday (1938) – Arthur
- I See Ice (1938) – Train Conductor (uncredited)
- 'Quiet Please (1938) – Bill
- On Velvet (1938) – Harry Higgs
- Almost a Honeymoon (1938) – Bailiff
- Break the News (1938) – Prison Guard
- 13 Men and a Gun (1938) – Hans
- Night Alone (1938) – Policeman
- Alf's Button Afloat (1938) – Sgt. Hawkins
- Pygmalion (1938) – First Bystander
- The Ware Case (1938) – Taxi Driver
- The Sky's the Limit (1938) – Commissionaire
- The Mind of Mr. Reeder (1939) – Lomer
- Inspector Hornleigh (1939) – Sam Holt aka Keyhole Charlie
- Sword of Honour (1939) – Pomeroy Brown
- Home from Home (1939) – Banks
- Poison Pen (1939) – Mr. Suggs
- Down Our Alley (1939) – Mr. Dunstable
- What Would You Do, Chums? (1939) – Tom
- Inspector Hornleigh on Holiday (1939) – Police Sergeant
- Pack Up Your Troubles (1940) – Sgt. Barker
- They Came by Night (1940) – Bugsie
- Return to Yesterday (1940) – Night Watchman
- Laugh It Off (1940) – Sergeant
- Band Waggon (1940) – Commissionaire
- Night Train to Munich (1940) – Fisherman (uncredited)
- Charley's (Big-Hearted) Aunt (1940) – The Buller
- The Flying Squad (1940) – Bargee (uncredited)
- Henry Steps Out (1940) – Wally
- Neutral Port (1940) – Fred
- Two Smart Men (1940) – Wally
- Gasbags (1941) – Sergeant-Major
- Old Mother Riley in Business (1941)
- Quiet Wedding (1941) – Magistrate
- Inspector Hornleigh Goes To It (1941) – Sergeant Major
- Cottage to Let (1941) – Evans
- Once a Crook (1941) – Warder
- Facing the Music (1941) – Briggs
- Jeannie (1941) – Porter
- I Thank You (1941) – Bill, The Fireman
- The Common Touch (1941) – 'Nobby'
- The Seventh Survivor (1942) – Bob Sutton
- Gert and Daisy's Weekend (1942) – Charlie Peters
- Bob's Your Uncle (1942) – Sgt. Brownfoot
- Banana Ridge (1942) – Police Officer
- Unpublished Story (1942) – Taxi Driver at Victoria Station
- Let the People Sing (1942) – Sam
- Salute John Citizen (1942) – Minor Role (uncredited)
- Sabotage at Sea (1942) – Tom (the steward)
- In Which We Serve (1942) – Uncle Fred
- We'll Smile Again (1942) – Head Porter
- Get Cracking (1943) – Sgt. Joe Preston
- The Life and Death of Colonel Blimp (1943) – Sergeant Clearing Debris (uncredited)
- Women in Bondage (1943) – German Soldier (uncredited)
- The Butler's Dilemma (1943) – Tom
- Death by Design (1943) – Sergeant Clinton
- One Exciting Night (1944) – Salvage Collector (uncredited)
- I Didn't Do It (1945) – Det Sgt. Carp
- Don Chicago (1945) – Sergeant
- Old Mother Riley at Home (1945) – Bouncer
- A Matter of Life and Death (1946) – ARP Warden (uncredited)
- Gaiety George (1946) – Commissionaire
- Wanted for Murder (1946) – Merry-Go-Round Barker
- George in Civvy Street (1946) – Sprout
- London Town (1946) – Constable (uncredited)
- Appointment with Crime (1946) – Joe Fisher – Garage Manager
- Dumb Dora Discovers Tobacco (1946)
- Green Fingers (1947) – Dawson
- Dusty Bates (1947) – Uncle Hank Miller
- The Ghosts of Berkeley Square (1947) – Foreman
- Brighton Rock (1948) – Bill (uncredited)
- Good-Time Girl (1948) – Bookie (uncredited)
- Calling Paul Temple (1948) – Spider Williams
- A Date with a Dream (1948) – Uncle
- The Guinea Pig (1948) – Uncle Percy
- River Patrol (1948) – The Guv
- The History of Mr. Polly (1949) – Customer
- Helter Skelter (1949) – BBC Commissionaire (uncredited)
- The Adventures of Jane (1949) – Customs Official
- The Twenty Questions Murder Mystery (1950) – Police Officer 'Tiny' White
- Salute the Toff (1952) – Bert Ebbutt
- Hammer the Toff (1952) – Bert Ebbutt
- My Wife's Lodger (1952) – Sergeant
- Will Any Gentleman...? (1953) – Bookmaker
- Thought to Kill (1953) – Bridger
- The Wedding of Lilli Marlene (1953) – Wally
- Josephine and Men (1955) – Landlord
- Private's Progress (1956) – Barman (uncredited)
- Not So Dusty (1956) – Porter
- Suspended Alibi (1957) – Porter
- The Naked Truth (1957) – Paunchy Old Man
- Morning Call (1957) – Wally, the tobacconist
- Too Many Crooks (1959) – Sergeant / Court Usher (uncredited)
- I'm All Right Jack (1959) – Workman
- Operation Cupid (1960) – Bookmaker
- The Challenge (1960) – Ticket Collector
- The Millionairess (1960) – Whelk Seller
- The Night We Got the Bird (1961) – Ticket collector
- Nothing Barred (1961) -Magazine Stall Proprietor – (billed as Walter Patch)
- Serena (1962) – Barman
- Danger by My Side (1962) – Factory Gatekeeper
- Sparrows Can't Sing (1963) – Watchman
- A Jolly Bad Fellow (1964) – Tom Pike
- The Bargee (1964) – Bargee (uncredited)
- The Comedy Man (1964) – Bar Manager (uncredited)
- Poor Cow (1967) – Customer in Pub
