= Desmond Roberts =

British actor (1894–1968)

- Born: 5 February 1894; Hampstead
- Died: 11 January 1968 (aged 73); Eastbourne
- Occupation: actor / cricketer
- Years active: 1913–1936 (cricket); 1927-1967 (film)

Desmond Roberts (5 February 1894 – 11 January 1968) was a British stage and film actor who also played first-class cricket (1913–1936) for Surrey. He was a left-handed batsman and right-arm medium pace bowler. He appeared in 12 first-class matches for Surrey during this period.

He began his film career at the end of the silent era and had his only leading role in A Reckless Gamble (1928). After which he had a brief sojourn to Hollywood, where he appeared in a number of classic films, including Tarzan and His Mate (1934), Of Human Bondage (1934), and Clive of India (1935). He then settled back in Britain, where he became a familiar supporting player in movies such as Scott of the Antarctic (1948), The Man in the White Suit (1951), and A Night to Remember (1958).

He was born in Hampstead and died in Eastbourne.

== Partial filmography ==
- A Woman in Pawn (1927) - David Courthill
- The City of Youth (1928)
- A Reckless Gamble (1928) - Dick Beresford
- Way for a Sailor (1930) - Canadian Queen Captain (uncredited)
- The Royal Bed (1931) - Major Blent
- The Squaw Man (1931) - Hardwick (uncredited)
- But the Flesh Is Weak (1932) - Findley
- Cavalcade (1933) - Ronnie James
- The King's Vacation (1933) - Dolan - Sergeant Footman (uncredited)
- Christopher Strong (1933) - Bryce Mercer
- Headline Shooter (1933) - Beauty Contest Judge (uncredited)
- Captured! (1933) - British Officer in the Trench (uncredited)
- Blind Adventure (1933) - Harvey (uncredited)
- Mandalay (1934) - Police Sergeant (uncredited)
- The House of Rothschild (1934) - Guest at Reception Hall
- Riptide (1934) - Hotel Manager (uncredited)
- Tarzan and His Mate (1934) - Henry Van Ness (uncredited)
- The Key (1934) - Regular (uncredited)
- Of Human Bondage (1934) - Dr. Jacobs
- Grand Canary (1934) - Purser
- The Count of Monte Cristo (1934) - Blacas (uncredited)
- The Girl from Missouri (1934) - Harris - Cousin's Butler (uncredited)
- Jane Eyre (1934) - Dr. John Rivers (uncredited)
- The Fountain (1934) - Willett
- House of Danger (1934) - Gordon - the Butler
- Menace (1934) - Underwood (uncredited)
- Limehouse Blues (1934) - Constable (uncredited)
- Clive of India (1935) - Third Director (uncredited)
- Gaol Break (1936) - Paul Kendall
- Under the Red Robe (1937) - Captain Rivarolle
- Lily of Laguna (1938) - Arnold Egerton
- My Ain Folk (1945) - Factory manager
- Give Me the Stars (1945) - Ship's Captain
- The Echo Murders (1945) - Cotter
- School for Secrets (1946) - 2nd Club Member
- Bothered by a Beard (1946) (uncredited)
- Dusty Bates (1947) - Ginger Green (uncredited)
- The White Unicorn (1947) - Elderly Roue (uncredited)
- The Calendar (1948) - Rainby
- Scott of the Antarctic (1948) - Admiralty Official
- The Bad Lord Byron (1949) - 2nd Old club member
- The Man in the White Suit (1951) - Mannering
- Appointment in London (1953) - Admiral Parker (uncredited)
- Beau Brummell (1954) - Colonel
- Simba (1955) - Colonel Bridgeman
- The Haunted Strangler (1958) - Dr. Johnson
- I Was Monty's Double (1958) - Brigadier
- The Two-Headed Spy (1958) - Gen. Zeiss
- A Night to Remember (1958) - Mr. Douglas (uncredited)
- A Touch of Larceny (1960) - Club Member
- Double Bunk (1961) - Freighter Captain
- Murder Ahoy! (1964) - Sir Geoffrey Bucknose (uncredited)
- Mister Ten Per Cent (1967) - Manservant (final film role)

== Bibliography ==
- Philip Leibfried & Chei Mi Lane. Anna May Wong: A Complete Guide to Her Film, Stage, Radio and Television Work. McFarland, 2003.
