= Henry Steps Out =

- Directed by: Widgey R. Newman
- Written by: Widgey R. Newman
- Produced by: Widgey R. Newman
- Starring: George Turner; Margaret Yarde; Wally Patch
- Production company: Widgey R. Newman Productions
- Distributed by: Equity British Films
- Release date: November 1940
- Running time: 52 minutes
- Country: United Kingdom
- Language: English

Henry Steps Out is a 1940 British comedy film directed, written and produced by Widgey R. Newman and starring George Turner, Margaret Yarde and Wally Patch. On the outbreak of the Second World War an idler is forced to join the army by his domineering wife.

== Preservation status ==
The British Film Institute National Archive holds no stills or ephemera, and no film or video materials.

== Plot ==
Cynthia Smith, the domineering wife of idler Henry Smith, arranges a job for Henry at Colonel Fotheringill's house. When the house is robbed, Henry assists in rounding the crooks up, and is set to receive a £50,000 reward. When a legal hitch holds up payment, Cynthia packs Henry off to join the Army. The Army refuses to accept him and he ends up, dressed as a woman, at an A.T.S. barracks, where he is enlisted... until the solicitors finally announce that he will receive Fotheringill's reward money.

== Cast ==
- George Turner as Henry Smith
- Margaret Yarde as Cynthia Smith
- Wally Patch as Wally

== Reception ==
The Monthly Film Bulletin wrote: "The film runs true to type, abounding in impossible situations. Its technique is that of a twice-nightly music-hall revue. The redeeming feature is the performance by Margaret Yarde as the overbearing wife pursuing her peccant husband."

Kine Weekly wrote: "Farcical comedy relating the hectic adventures of a henpecked husband, who manages to outwit or at least out-fumble not only his wife but also a gang of crooks and an imposing number of A.T.S. girls. The story covers a great deal of ground, and is not always adequately supplied with connecting links. The popular slapstick, quota angle and useful length make it an acceptable light booking for the smaller industrial and family halls."
