= Peter Fraser (screenwriter) =

British screenwriter, playwright and short story writer (1915–1965)

- Born: Alexander Peter Fordham Watt; 12 April 1915; Hampstead, London, England
- Died: 4 August 1965 (aged 50); Kensington, London, England
- Occupations: Screenwriter, playwright and short story writer
- Writing career
- Pen name: Peter Fraser; Peter Watt
- Period: 1940s–1960s

Alexander Peter Fordham Watt (12 April 1915 – 4 August 1965), known professionally as Peter Watt and Peter Fraser, was a British screenwriter, playwright and short story writer.

== Filmography ==
Year	Title	Credit	Notes	Ref.
1944	Bell-Bottom George	Story and screenplay		
1944	One Exciting Night	Story and screenplay		
1945	I Didn't Do It	Contributions		
1946	George in Civvy Street	Screenplay		
1947	Dancing with Crime	Original story		
1959	Model for Murder	Original story		
