= Lucky Blaze =

- Trade advertisement from The Daily Film Renter (6 September 1933)
- Directed by: Widgey R. Newman
- Written by: Widgey R. Newman
- Starring: William Freshman; Vera Sherborne; Moore Marriott
- Production company: Ace Films
- Distributed by: Ace Films
- Release date: August 1933
- Running time: 48 minutes
- Country: United Kingdom
- Language: English

Lucky Blaze is a 1933 British film directed and written by Widgey R. Newman and starring William Freshman, Vera Sherborne and Moore Marriott. It was made as a quota quickie.

== Preservation status ==
The British Film Institute National Archive holds no stills or ephemera, and no film or video materials.

== Plot ==
Through a series of dramatised incidents, a horse narrates the story of its life.

== Cast ==
- William Freshman as Cliff Ellis
- Vera Sherborne as Rose Benson
- Moore Marriott as Sir James Benson
- Freddie Fox as Freddie
- J. Collins as Collingdean
- Ian Wilson
- R. E. Jeffreys
- Harry Rodbourne
- Jack Walsh
- Sammy Wregg
- Micky Beary
- Ken Robertson
- Buster Rickaby

== Reception ==
The Daily Film Renter wrote: "Slender thread of story against backgrounds of training stables and racecourses. Commentary, ostensibly spoken by horse, describes training methods and gradual rise to fame. ... In the course of the narrative a number of famous jockeys make brief appearances."

Picturegoer wrote: "Unpretentions story of the racecourse with picturesque and authentic settings. The story is told by a horse; there is no dialogue, the horse's thoughts being represented by an appropriate commentary given by R. E. Jeffreys. The plot does not matter much; it is the introduction of famous jockeys and trainers at work which will intrigue many followers of the turf."

== See also ==
- List of films about horses
