= Cohen on the Telephone =

Comedy monologue

Recording of "Cohen at the Telephone" by George Thompson (1916)

"Cohen on the Telephone", also known as "Cohen at the Telephone", is a comedy monologue. The monologue was released on cylinder records, 78 rpm records, and early sound film.

== History of recordings ==
The first recording of the monologue was made in London by Joe Hayman for Regal Records in 1913, and it was subsequently issued in the U.S. by Columbia Records. Hayman's version of the monologue reached over 2 million sales in the United States. The success of the record led to cover versions recorded by performers such as Monroe Silver in 1914, Barney Bernard in March 1916 for Victor Records, and George Thompson, also in 1916, whose version was released on Edison Records. In 1927, Victor issued an electrical recording of the monologue by Julius Tannen.

A sound-on-film recording was made in 1923 with Monroe Silver by Lee de Forest in the Phonofilm process, and with George Sidney (1876–1945) in September 1929 by Universal Pictures.

Hayman recorded a similar routine entitled "Cohen Buys a Wireless Set" in 1923 on Columbia Records.

== Synopsis of sketch ==
The monologue is Mr. Cohen's attempt to contact his landlord using a telephone of the period. The humor is derived from that of the Cohen's "stereotypical" tendency to make puns, and perhaps the difficulty in being understood on the then primitive telephone with his thick Yiddish accent:

"Hello, I'm Cohen...I'M COHEN...No- I ain't Goin...I'm stopping here....Hello! This is your tenant Cohen...YOUR TENANT COHEN....No, NOT Lieutenant Cohen..."

The purpose of the call was to ask the landlord to send a repairman down to his location after a windstorm had caused property damage. In frustration, he hangs up at the end of the record and decides to arrange for the repairs himself.

== Bibliography ==
- Smith, Jacob (2008) Vocal Tracks: Performance and Sound Media University of California Press, pages 205–207
