= 1932 in British television =

This is a list of events related to British television in 1932.

== Events ==
- 22 August – The BBC starts a regular experimental television service, using John Logie Baird's 30-line mechanical system.
- EMI demonstrate electronic television, with up to 3 times as many lines as Baird's mechanical system, to the BBC.

== Births ==
- 12 January – Des O'Connor, television personality and singer (died 2020)
- 6 March – Jean Boht, née Dance, actress (died 2023)
- 17 April – Tony Bilbow, presenter and screenwriter
- 21 April – Bob Grant, comic actor (died 2003)
- 25 April – William Roache, actor (Coronation Street)
- 8 May – Phyllida Law, Scottish-born actress
- 22 June – Prunella Scales, actress (died 2025)
- 8 July – Brian Walden, journalist, broadcaster and member of parliament (died 2019)
- 2 August – Peter O'Toole, British-Irish-born actor (died 2013)
- 7 August – Edward Hardwicke, actor (died 2011)
- 9 August – Reginald Bosanquet, journalist and news presenter (died 1984)
- 20 August – Anthony Ainley, actor (died 2004)
- 21 August – Barry Foster, actor (Van der Valk) (died 2002)
- 4 September – Dinsdale Landen, actor (died 2003)
- 25 September – Brian Murphy, comedy actor (died 2025)
- 26 September – Andrew Gardner, journalist and newsreader (died 1999)
- 28 September – Jeremy Isaacs, producer and executive
- 30 October – Janice Willett, producer with ABC Weekend TV (died 2018)
- 20 November – Richard Dawson, comedian and game show host (died 2012)

== See also ==
- 1932 in British music
- 1932 in the United Kingdom
- List of British films of 1932
