= Vi Kaley =

British actress (1878–1967)

Vi Kaley (19 November 1878, Lambeth – 1967, Marylebone) was a British actress. Violet Kaley married the gymnast Alfred Lilley Artois (1874-1933) in 1899.

== Partial filmography ==
- Lloyd of the C.I.D. (1932)
- A Royal Demand (1933)
- Gay Old Dog (1935)
- The Man Without a Face (1935)
- I Live Again (1936)
- Men of Yesterday (1936)
- The Song of the Road (1937)
- Auld Lang Syne (1937)
- On Velvet (1938)
- The Second Mr. Bush (1940)
- Love on the Dole (1941)
- Front Line Kids (1942)
- Gert and Daisy's Weekend (1942)
- Variety Jubilee (1943)
- Fanny by Gaslight (1944)
- I'll Turn to You (1946)
- The Trojan Brothers (1946)
- Code of Scotland Yard (1947)
- The Fool and the Princess (1948)
- Woman Hater (1948)
- My Brother Jonathan (1948)
- The Mudlark (1950)
- Something in the City (1950)
- Scrooge (1951)
- My Wife's Lodger (1952)
- Cosh Boy (1952)
- Behind the Headlines (1953)
