= Joe Hayman =

American comedian (1876–1957)

- Born: Joseph Hyman; April 16, 1876; Philadelphia, Pennsylvania, U.S.
- Died: February 1, 1957 (aged 80); Hollywood, California, U.S.
- Occupation: Vaudeville performer

Joe Hayman (born Joseph Hyman; April 16, 1876 – February 1, 1957) was an American vaudeville comedian who also worked in British music halls, on radio and in films.

== Life and career ==
He was born in Philadelphia, the son of German Jewish immigrants. His older brother Jacob Hyman partnered his boyhood friend Ehrich Weiss as the Brothers Houdini, with Weiss taking the name Harry Houdini. When Jacob left the act in 1893, Joe replaced him. He was in turn replaced by his younger brother Theo, before Weiss became a star solo performer.

Joe Hyman modified his surname to Hayman, and according to most sources married Mildred Franklin, who became his stage partner in the double act of Hayman and Franklin. They became popular in Britain as well as the U.S., and in 1913 Hayman recorded his comic monologue "Cohen on the Telephone" in London. This took the form of a call on the recently invented telephone from a heavily accented Jewish tenant to his landlord, with a stream of misunderstandings arising from Hayman's accent and malapropisms. The recording became very successful, reportedly the first comedy record to sell a million copies (some sources say two million). Several cover versions were made by other comedians, notably Monroe Silver.

Hayman made several similar recordings in later years, such as "Cohen 'Phones the Gas Company", "Cohen 'Phones Mrs Levy", and many others. A book containing many of his monologues was published in 1927. Hayman and Franklin performed mainly in Britain for over thirty years, including appearances on BBC Radio. They also toured internationally. Hayman appeared in many films, mostly in character as a Jewish comedian, including The Lucky Number (1932), Borrowed Clothes (1934), and On Velvet (1938).

Hayman and Franklin later returned to live in the United States. Franklin died in 1954. Hayman died in Hollywood, California, in 1957, at the age of 80, and was buried at Forest Lawn Memorial Park, Glendale.
