= Howard Irving Young =

American screenwriter and playwright (1893–1952)

- Born: April 24, 1893; Jersey City, New Jersey, United States
- Died: February 24, 1952 (aged 58); Hollywood, California, United States
- Occupation: Writer
- Years active: 1915–1950 (film)

Howard Irving Young (April 24, 1893 – February 24, 1952) was an American screenwriter and playwright. During the 1930s and 1940s he worked on a number of British films.

== Selected filmography ==
- A Million A Minute (1916)
- Miss Nobody (1917)
- Vengeance Is Mine (1917)
- No Trespassing (1922)
- Does It Pay? (1923)
- The Perfect Sap (1927)
- Her Wild Oat (1927)
- Midnight Mystery (1930)
- Television (1931)
- Music in the Air (1934)
- Spring Tonic (1935)
- Under Pressure (1935)
- Secret of Stamboul (1936)
- The Crimson Circle (1936)
- Said O'Reilly to McNab (1937)
- The Great Gambini (1937)
- Hey! Hey! USA (1938)
- Hi Gang! (1941)
- I Thank You (1941)
- It's That Man Again (1943)
- He Snoops to Conquer (1944)
- One Exciting Night (1944)
- Time Flies (1944)
- I Didn't Do It (1945)
- George in Civvy Street (1946)
- Let's Live a Little (1948)
- The Flying Saucer (1950)

== Bibliography ==
- Marshall, Wendy L. William Beaudine: From Silents to Television. Scarecrow Press, 2005.
