= On Velvet =

- Directed by: Widgey R. Newman
- Written by: John Quin
- Produced by: Widgey R. Newman
- Starring: Wally Patch; Joe Hayman; Vi Kaley
- Production company: Associated Industries
- Distributed by: Columbia Pictures
- Release date: 26 September 1938
- Running time: 70 minutes
- Country: United Kingdom
- Language: English

On Velvet is a 1938 British musical comedy film directed by Widgey R. Newman and starring Wally Patch, Joe Hayman and Vi Kaley. It was written by John Quin and distributed by the American company Columbia Pictures. It was reissued in 1941.

== Plot ==
After a betting dispute involving a racehorce named "On Velvet", Sam Cohen and Harry Higgs join forces to run a television station, bringing variety artistes to the screen.

== Cast ==
- Wally Patch as Harry Higgs
- Joe Hayman as Sam Cohen
- Vi Kaley as Mrs. Higgs
- Mildred Franklin as Mrs. Cohen
- Helga & Joe as themselves
- Jennifer Skinner as Mary
- Leslie Bradley as Monty
- Ambrose Day as Waterbury
- Nina Mae McKinney as singer
- Julie Suedo as singer
- Gordon Little
- Eric Barker
- Collinson & Dean as themselves
- Mark Stone as Mark
- Rex Burrows as orchestra leader
- Olive Delmer
- Cleo Fauvel
- Robert Field
- Queenie Lucy
- Sydney Moncton
- Andrée Sacré
- George Sims
- Garland Wilson

== Reception ==
The Daily Film Renter wrote: "The picture is rollicking nonsense throughout, and the story a secondary matter, but Wally Patch and Joe Hayman as Higgs and Cohen do the cockney and Yiddish character material in a manner likely to please the masses, while a number of excellent turns are introduced."

The Monthly Film Bulletin wrote: "The film is tedious, maudlin and lacking in good taste. The acting and photography are poor."

Kine Weekly wrote: "This feature, so far as the jokes are concerned is simply a collection of antiques. Betting, drinking, and telephone humour is all of the familiar brand, and Nina Mae McKinney even sings the 'Swanee River.' Mr. Newman has spared us nothing, but he has not produced anything that could reasonably be called film entertainment."

Picturegoer wrote: "An exceedingly thin story serves as an excuse to introduce a number of vaudeville turns in this picture which is so dated in its humour and in production generally that it is difficult to know where its appeal lies."

Picture Show wrote: "Rather long-winded, but amusing in parts."
