= Haddon Mason =

British actor (1898–1966)

- Born: 21 February 1898; London, England
- Died: 30 April 1966 (aged 68); London, England
- Other name: Hadden Mason
- Occupation: Film actor
- Years active: 1925–1940
- Spouse: Maudie Dunham

Haddon Mason (21 February 1898 – 30 April 1966) was a British film actor.

== Selected filmography ==
- Every Mother's Son (1926)
- Dawn (1928)
- The Triumph of the Scarlet Pimpernel (1928)
- The Lady of the Lake (1928)
- The Woman in White (1929)
- A Peep Behind the Scenes (1929)
- Painted Pictures (1930)
- London Melody (1930)
- French Leave (1930)
- Inquest (1931)
- The Shadow Between (1931)
- Castle Sinister (1932)
- The Village Squire (1935)
- Contraband (1940)
