= Julie Suedo =

British actress (1901–1978)

- Born: 1901; London, England; United Kingdom
- Died: 1978 (aged 76–77); Wembley, England; United Kingdom
- Occupation: Film actress
- Years active: 1923–1945

Julie Suedo (1901–1978) was a British actress. She played a succession of glamorous roles in the 1920s and 1930s, usually in supporting roles.

== Filmography ==
- One Arabian Night (1923)
- The Rat (1925)
- One Colombo Night (1926)
- The Triumph of the Rat (1926)
- One of the Best (1927)
- The Fake (1927)
- Two Little Drummer Boys (1928)
- The Vortex (1928)
- Victory (1928)
- A Window in Piccadilly (1928)
- Afterwards (1928)
- The Physician (1928)
- The White Sheik (1928)
- Smashing Through (1929)
- The Woman from China (1930)
- Dangerous Seas (1931)
- Paris Plane (1933)
- Commissionaire (1933)
- Love's Old Sweet Song (1933)
- Nell Gwyn (1934)
- Play Up the Band (1935)
- Dream Doctor (1936)
- Queen of Hearts (1936)
- The Lilac Domino (1937)
- Our Fighting Navy (1937)
- The Life of Chopin (1938, short)
- A Dream of Love (1938, short)
- Georges Bizet, Composer of Carmen (1938, short)
- Blarney (1938)
- The Dance of Death (1938)
- If I Were Boss (1938)
- On Velvet (1938)
- The Villiers Diamond (1938)
- Night Alone (1938)
- The Dark Eyes of London (1939)
- Saloon Bar (1940)
- Kiss the Bride Goodbye (1945)
