= A Reckless Gamble =

1928 silent film

- Trade Show advertisement (The Daily Film Renter (15 March 1929)
- Directed by: Widgey R. Newman
- Written by: Ernie Lotinga
- Produced by: Frank Wheatcroft
- Starring: Desmond Roberts; Gladys Dunham; Wally Patch
- Production company: Widgey R. Newman Productions
- Distributed by: Producers Distributing Corporation
- Release date: October 1928
- Running time: 48 minutes
- Country: United Kingdom
- Languages: Silent; English intertitles

A Reckless Gamble (also known as Man in the Saddle) is a 1928 British silent sports film directed by Widgey R. Newman and starring Desmond Roberts, Gladys Dunham and Wally Patch. It was written by Ernie Lotinga, and produced as a quota quickie.

== Preservation status ==
The British Film Institute National Archive holds no stills or ephemera, and no film or video materials.

== Plot ==
Racehorse owner Dick Beresford is in love with Eve Charteris, but they cannot marry because he is penniless. He turns to betting to remedy the situation, and clashes with Sir Miles Wellington, his rival in business, and in love.

== Cast ==
- Desmond Roberts as Dick Beresford
- Gladys Dunham as Eve Charteris
- Wally Patch as Wally
- Simeon Stuart as Sir Miles Wellington
- Chubb Leach

== Reception ==
Film Weekly wrote: "A very poor example of a racing drama ... The film suffers from slow development, poor acting and general lack of realism. On the whole, a very disappointing picture."

Kine Weekly wrote: "The only thing in this feature is the producer's attempt to give unknown artistes a chance in leading parts. The story is a very poor racing drama and lacks both grip and interest."

The Daily Film Renter wrote: "An artless story of the turf with all the old familiar sentiments and situations. Impoverished hero, scheming rival, heroine desired by both, big race to decide issue, 'nobbled' jockey, and final coup restoring the hero's fortunes. ... A Reckless Gamble's appeal is strictly limited to patrons of the easily pleased variety, whose numbers now are considerably less than they were when this type of film was a novelty."

== See also ==
- List of films about horses
