= I'll Turn to You =

1946 British drama film

- Directed by: Geoffrey Faithfull
- Written by: David Evans; Kay Butler
- Produced by: F.W. Baker
- Starring: Terry Randall; Don Stannard; Harry Welchman
- Cinematography: Arthur Grant
- Edited by: Ted Richards
- Music by: Harry Bidgood
- Production company: Butcher's Film Service
- Distributed by: Butcher's Film Service
- Release date: 17 June 1946
- Running time: 97 minutes
- Country: United Kingdom
- Language: English

I'll Turn to You is a 1946 British drama film directed by Geoffrey Faithfull and starring Terry Randall, Don Stannard and Harry Welchman. A returning serviceman faces problems with his wife and his job. Although not a musical, the film has a lengthy concert segment at the end that allows the title song to wrap up the narrative.

== Plot ==
Ex-pilot Roger Meredith returns to his wife Aileen, and to his pre-war job in an advertising agency, but finds settling back into civilian life difficult. Despite an offer of a luxury apartment from Henry Browning, Aileen's rich admirer, Aileen prefers independence and instead finds dilapidated rooms for the family. Roger hates their low standard of living. He loses faith in himself, quits his job and leaves Aileen and their young child. Later Henry bumps into Roger, who is now a hotel porter, and persuades him to return to Aileen. They are reconciled.

== Cast ==
- Terry Randall as Aileen Meredith
- Don Stannard as Roger Meredith
- Harry Welchman as Mr. Collins
- Ann Codrington as Mrs. Collins
- Ellis Irving as Henry Browning
- Irene Handl as Mrs. Gammon
- George Merritt as Cecil Joy
- Nicolette Roeg as Flora Fenton
- Anthony Pendrell as Dick Fenton
- Leslie Perrins as Mr. Chigwell
- Grace Arnold as nurse
- Hal Gordon as taxi driver
- Aubrey Mallalieu as Managing Director
- Hilda Bayley as gossiping guest at party
- Lesley Osmond as gossiping guest at party
- Davina Craig as telephonist
- Cameron Hall as the neighbour
- David Keir as estate agent
- Jack Vyvyan as Stage Door keeper
- Vi Kaley as dharlady at Collins's office
- Hamilton Keene as hotel receptionist
- Olive Kirby as office girl
- Harry Bidgood as orchestra conductor
- Evelyn Laye as self
- Sandy Macpherson as self
- Sylvia Welling as self

== Production ==
The film was shot at the Walton Studios in Walton-on-Thames, Surrey, England, with sets were designed by art director George Paterson. It was made by Butcher's Film Service as a higher budget film than usual.

== Critical reception ==
Kine Weekly said: "A refreshing and tuneful musical melodrama, based on the famous ballad. ... The warm, humorous and topical story has attractive and appropriate musical intermissions. ... These, reinforced by an engaging small-child interest give the picture an imposing facade without destroying the tender and ingratiating intimacy of its homely and propitious rehabilitation theme. In other words, Butcher's know all that there is to know about these song-title comedy melodramas".

The Monthly Film Bulletin wrote: "This timely film deals with a rehabilitation problem, and will have special appeal for young people demobbed from the Services. Against a singularly well-chosen cast, Don Stannard and Terry Randall shine as the disgruntled young airman and his loyal, devoted little wife. There is some delightful comedy from Irene Handl and George Merritt, and the particularly well-recorded musical interludes will be found to add much to the enjoyment of the film."

In British Sound Films: The Studio Years 1928–1959 David Quinlan rated the film as "good" and wrote: "Good performances by young leads in a topical film with music thrown in.''
