= George in Civvy Street =

- UK trade ad poster
- Directed by: Marcel Varnel; Ben Henry
- Written by: Howard Irving Young; Peter Fraser; Ted Kavanagh; Max Kester; Gale Pedrick
- Produced by: Marcel Varnel; Ben Henry
- Starring: George Formby; Ronald Shiner; Rosalyn Boulter; Ian Fleming
- Cinematography: Phil Grindrod
- Edited by: Douglas Robertson
- Music by: Harry Bidgood
- Production company: Columbia Pictures
- Distributed by: Columbia Pictures Corporation
- Release date: 8 July 1946 (UK)
- Running time: 79 minutes
- Country: United Kingdom
- Language: English

George in Civvy Street (also known as Remember the Unicorn) is a 1946 British comedy film directed and produced by Marcel Varnel starring George Formby with Ronald Shiner and Ian Fleming. It was written by Howard Irving Young, Peter Fraser, Ted Kavanagh, Max Kester and Gale Pedrick, and was made by the British subsidiary of Columbia Pictures. This was Formby's last big screen appearance. After the film was unsuccessful at the box office, he resumed his career in the music hall.

== Plot summary ==
George Harper leaving the forces and becomesa village pub owner, who works to turn a waitress from her current boss, a rival pub owner. Harper falls in love with the waitress, and various battles ensue between the pub rivals.

== Cast ==
- George Formby as George Harper
- Rosalyn Boulter as Mary Colton
- Ronald Shiner as Fingers
- Ian Fleming as Uncle Shad
- Wally Patch as Sprout
- Philippa Hiatt as Lavender
- Enid Cruickshank as Miss Gummidge
- Robert Ginns as Crabtree
- Mike Johnson as Toby
- Frank Drew as Jed
- Daphne Elphinstone as Mitzi Montrose
- Johnny Claes as himself
- Ronnie Scott as band member
- Rita Varian as Mrs Brindle

== Critical reception ==
The Monthly Film Bulletin wrote: "The various farcical sequences in this film are not very amusing. George Formby as the good-natured oaf, Harper, will presumably please his numerous and faithful fans, though he is unlikely by this performance to win over those people who still remain unappreciative. Direction and supporting cast are adequate."

Kine Weekly wrote: "Artless slapstick comedy ... George Formby puts over his ditties effectively as the not-so-goofy hero, but neither he nor the supporting players receive much help from the script. The laughs are not only clumsily telegraphed, but incredibly few. Very moderate British light booking, a proposition mainly for provincial audiences."

According to TV Guide, the film is "lifeless farce", and a "tasteless romp".

Sky Movies wrote, "the partnership of music hall favourite George Formby and director Marcel Varnel (who also turned out the best of the Will Hay and Arthur Askey comedies) was looking distinctly jaded after six movies in a row. And despite a formidable array of four new writers, this stale comedy about pub rivalry, ended Formby's screen career on a low note".
