= Commissionaire (film) =

1933 British film by Edward Dryhurst

- Directed by: Edward Dryhurst
- Written by: Herbert Ayres
- Produced by: Edward G. Whiting
- Starring: Sam Livesey; Barry Livesey; George Carney
- Cinematography: Desmond Dickinson
- Production company: Granville Films
- Distributed by: Metro-Goldwyn-Mayer
- Release date: October 1933
- Running time: 72 minutes
- Country: United Kingdom
- Language: English

Commissionaire is a 1933 British crime film directed by Edward Dryhurst and starring Sam Livesey, Barry Livesey and George Carney. It was written by Herbert Ayres, and was shot at Cricklewood Studios as a quota quickie for release by MGM.

== Preservation status ==
The British Film Institute National Archive holds no stills or ephemera, and no film or video materials.

== Plot ==
A commissionaire is suspected of a robbery committed by his son.

== Cast ==
- Sam Livesey as Sergeant George Brown
- Barry Livesey as Tom Brown
- George Carney as Sergeant Ted Seymour
- Betty Huntley-Wright as Betty Seymour
- Julie Suedo as Thelma Monsell
- Robert English as Colonel Gretton
- Hannah Jones as Mrs. Brown
- Granville Ferrier as Desborough
- Georgie Harris as Briggs
- Humberston Wright as quartermaster

== Reception ==
The Daily Film Renter wrote: "Unconvincing drama of army veterans who return to civilian life, and yet remain in uniform, telling the story of the loyalty of ex-Service men. Long arm of coincidence dominates story and reaches height of incredibility in final scene. Uninspired direction, poor photography, but settings adequate. Sam Livesey tends to overact as the heavy father; stodgy performance from his son, Barrie. Second feature for unsophisticated patrons."
