= Apron Fools =

1936 British film by Widgey R. Newman

- Trade Show advertisement (The Daily Film Renter, 18 June 1936)
- Directed by: Widgey R. Newman
- Screenplay by: John Quin
- Produced by: Harry S. Marks
- Production company: Marks Picture Corporation
- Release date: 1936
- Running time: 34 minutes
- Country: United Kingdom
- Language: English

Apron Fools is a 1936 British short comedy film directed by Widgey R. Newman and starring Wally Patch and Hal Walters. It was written by John Quin, and made as a quota quickie.

== Preservation status ==
The British Film Institute National Archive holds no stills or ephemera, and no film or video materials.

== Plot ==
The heroine is the young daughter of a local alderman, who is acting the role of a parlourmaid in the village church's amateur dramatic society. Reggie, the wealthy son of a knight, falls for her, but assumes she is actually a servant girl. His father, on meeting an ugly duckling maid at the heroine's house, incorrectly thinks she is his son's paramour, and objects to the romance.

== Cast ==
- Wally Patch
- Hal Walters as Reggie
- Frederick Bradshaw
- Anne Bolt
- Kathleen Saxon
- Margaret Lacey
- Elsie Wagstaffe
- Ben Williams

== Reception ==
The Daily Film Renter wrote: "Continuity is jerky and production values crude, while the mediocre plot is poor in entertainment angles, most of which derive from robust parvenu study by Wally Patch, whose downright cockney comedy is subject's only saving grace. For uncritical patrons. It is not possible to arouse much interest for this somewhat crude effort, although preview laughs were forthcoming on account of a robust cockney study by Wally Patch, despite his lamentable material. ... Production values, continuity, and story angles are extremely poor, while the cast are hard put to it to infuse life into crude dialogue and banal situations."

Kine Weekly wrote: "Unpretentious little comedy."

Picture Show called the film "Dull comedy."
