= Tiger Bay (1934 film) =

1934 film

- Promotional poster
- Directed by: J. Elder Wills
- Story by: Eric Ansell; J. Elder Wills; John Quin
- Produced by: Bray Wyndham
- Starring: Anna May Wong; Henry Victor
- Cinematography: Robert G. Martin; Alan Lawson
- Edited by: David Lean; Ian Thomson
- Music by: Eric Ansell
- Production company: ATP Studios, Ealing
- Release date: 1934
- Running time: 73 minutes
- Country: United Kingdom
- Language: English

Tiger Bay is a 1934 low-budget British film directed by J. Elder Wills and starring Chinese-American actress Anna May Wong and Henry Victor. It was written by Eric Ansell, Wills and John Quin.

== Plot ==
Michael, a young Englishman abroad, is determined to prove that love and romance can exist even in the slums. He goes to search for it in Tiger Bay, the French-administered tropical "home of all the riff-raff of the Seven Seas", confident he can bring back proof that good in its most romantic form exists even there.

Tiger Bay is noisy, violent and lawless. Lui Chang runs a bar where she conceals her young, pretty, blonde foster sister Letty. Lui wants to protect Letty from the evils of Tiger Bay, and is saving money to allow them to leave. Letty sneaks downstairs to watch Lui perform a new dance for the customers and is spotted by Olaf, a local rough. Michael defends Letty, he fights with Olaf and is stabbed in the arm. Lui assists him, and he is allowed to recover from his wound upstairs. Michael and Letty fall in love.

Olaf proposes charging Lui for "protecting" her business, but Lui proudly refuses his proposition. Lui explains to Michael that her father had been a Manchu of the mandarin class, who had had to flee China during the 1911 revolution, taking with him his daughter Lui and Letty, the child of his English friend who was killed. Mr. Chang set up in business in Tiger Bay, but recently died leaving to Lui the business and the care of Letty.

Olaf drives away Lui's staff and kills her waiter, Alf, as a warning to her. She reports the murder to the police, recruits friends to work at the bar and warns Olaf and his cronies she could poison them.

Olaf kidnaps Letty while she is out walking with Michael, leaving him unconscious. He and the police surround Olaf's cronies, who are either killed or arrested. Michael rescues Letty.

Meanwhile Olaf has been visiting Lui, demanding money for the return of Letty. Lui gets a signed order of release from Olaf, and in return gives him all of her savings. Before he can leave, she kills him with a knife. Rather than let Letty have to endure her being imprisoned for life for murder, Lui jabs her wrist with a poisoned ring. Dying, she whispers an ancient Chinese poem.

== Cast ==
- Anna May Wong as Lui Chang
- Henry Victor as Olaf
- Lawrence Grossmith as Whistling Rufus
- Margaret Yarde as Fay
- Rene Ray as Letty
- Victor Garland as Michael
- Ernest Jay as Alf
- Wally Patch as Wally
- Graham Soutten (credited as Ben Souten) as Stumpy
- Brian Buchel as Tony
- Judy Kelly as bar girl
- Ruth Ambler

== Production ==
The movie was originally intended to be set in the Limehouse district of London, but UK censors condemned the script as "the worst type of American gangster film" and would not allow a British city to be shown harbouring such a den of vice and iniquity, and so the story had to be moved to an unspecified South American location.

Although a run-of-the-mill B movie, the film gave Wong ample space and time to show off her wardrobe, dance skills and exotic charms.

== Reception ==
Picturegoer wrote: "Anna May Wong certainly looks the part of the calm, fatalistic Chinese woman who sacrifices herself to save a young English orphan whom she has adopted, from a brutal seaman, but otherwise the production is very conventional, artificial and strained in construction. Henry Victor is fair as the seaman, but Victor Garland is theatrical as the orphan's English lover. Dialogue is commonplace and the Eastern atmosphere distinctly synthetic."

Picture Show wrote: "Through the hearty thrills of this tropical melodrama, Anna May Wong moves with a passive calm that stands out effectively."
