= Model for Murder =

1959 British film by Terry Bishop

- U.S. poster
- Directed by: Terry Bishop
- Written by: Terry Bishop; Robert Dunbar; Peter Fraser (story)
- Produced by: Robert Dunbar; Jack Parsons (as C. Jack Parsons)
- Starring: Keith Andes; Hazel Court; Michael Gough
- Cinematography: Peter Hennessy
- Edited by: Helga Cranston
- Music by: William Davies
- Production company: Jack Parsons Productions (as Parroch)
- Distributed by: British Lion Film Corporation (UK)
- Release date: February 1959 (UK)
- Running time: 73 minutes
- Country: United Kingdom
- Language: English

Model for Murder is a 1959 British second feature ('B') crime film directed by Terry Bishop and starring Keith Andes, Hazel Court and Jean Aubrey. It was written by Bishop and Robert Dunbar from a story by Peter Fraser.

== Plot ==
American sailor David Martens, on shore leave in England, visits his brother Jack's grave. He meets fashion designer Sally Meadows, who by coincidence works with Jack's ex-fiancée, Diana, a model.

Successful stylist Kingsley Beauchamp and financial backer and designer Madame Dupont own the company where Sally and Diana are employed. Expensive borrowed diamonds are to be worn by Diana when she models a new dress, but Beauchamp hires two men, Costard and Podd, to break into the safe after hours and steal the gems.

Diana stumbles on the robbery, and Costard kills her with a knife. David is passing the studio and sees Diane collapse into the window with a knife in her back. He breaks in to help her, but Costard knocks him unconscious and is about to kill him, but Beauchamp decides to frame David for the theft by placing the murder weapon in his pocket and crashing a car with David inside, having reported it stolen.

While the police make David a prime suspect, Beauchamp and Costard dispose of Diana's body and hide the diamonds. When David starts to suspect them, they decide to murder him using gas, but Sally saves him. She, her model sister Annabelle and Annabelle's photographer boyfriend George help David evade the police whilst he investigates.

Diana's body is found in a river. David goes to Costard's home and discovers the missing dress worn by Diana; Costard had instructed her to burn it but she couldn't resist trying it on. The dress ties Costard to the murder. The police arrived and David, knowing that Beauchamp is about to fly to Amsterdam, hurries to the airport. Costard is there, being double-crossed while Podd smuggles the jewels on Beauchamp's behalf. The police arrive in time to arrest all three.

== Cast ==
- Keith Andes as David Martens
- Hazel Court as Sally Meadows
- Jean Aubrey as Annabelle Meadows
- Michael Gough as Kingsley Beauchamp
- Julia Arnall as Diana Leigh
- Patricia Jessel as Madame Dupont
- Peter Hammond as George
- Edwin Richfield as Costard, chauffeur
- Alfred Burke as Podd
- Richard Pearson as Bullock
- George Benson as Freddie
- Diane Bester as Tessa
- Howard Marion-Crawford as Inspector Duncan
- Neil Hallett as Sgt. Anderson
- Barbara Archer as Betty Costard
- Annabel Maule as hospital Sister
- Charles Lamb as lock keeper

== Production ==
Filming took place on a three-week schedule at Shepperton Studios, and on location in London and Surrey.

== Critical reception ==
The Monthly Film Bulletin wrote: "This routine thriller leaves little to the imagination, and leans far too heavily on coincidence for its suspense mechanics to work satisfactorily."

Picturegoer wrote: "The cast tackle their cardboard characters with some spirit."

In British Sound Films, David Quinlan wrote "Spirited cast can't do very much with very routine thriller."
