= The Dance of Death (1938 film) =

1938 British film by Gerald Blake

- Julie Suedo in the film
- Directed by: Gerald Blake
- Screenplay by: Ralph Dawson
- Starring: Stewart Rome; Julie Suedo; Vesta Victoria
- Production company: Glenrose Film Productions
- Release date: 1938
- Running time: 64 minutes
- Country: United Kingdom
- Language: English

The Dance of Death (also known as The Vengeance of Kali) is a 1938 British drama film directed by Gerald Blake and starring Stewart Rome, Julie Suedo and Vesta Victoria. It was written by Ralph Dawson and produced as a quota quickie.

== Plot ==
On his release from a French prison, Armand Chabrier is determined to track down Mara Gesna, the ex-criminal woman who betrayed him, and now a dancer. He hatches a dual plan to steal the legendary Lander jewels and murder Mara. Arranging for her to perform at Lord Lander’s coming-of-age party, he instructs Mara to steal the jewels when she gets a chance. During the climax of her performance – the "Dance of Death" – the lights suddenly cut out. Seizing the opportunity, Mara rips the jewel from Lady Lander’s neck. Chabrier stabs Mara, grabs the gem, and flees. Lord Lander and his girlfriend give chase, forcing Chabrier to take a wrong turn and drive his car over a cliff. It explodes on the rocks below, enacting the ancient curse that promises a violent death to anyone who steals the jewels.

== Cast ==
- Stewart Rome as Armand Chabrier
- Julie Suedo as Mara Gesna
- Vesta Victoria as Lady Lander
- Basil Broadbent as Raymond Lander
- Billy Merrin and his Commanders as themselves

== Production ==
The film was shot at Stoll Studios, Cricklewood and on location at Hertford and Newlyn.

== Reception ==
Kine Weekly wrote: "The plot contains several moments of genuine dramatic surprise, and the sinister atmosphere of crime and cunning is fairly well sustained. It suffers from a species of dialogue which needs brightening up, but as a whole the film seems to be a sincere attempt to do something better than the ordinary quota stuff. Stewart Rome brings a touch of distinction to a cast otherwise rather indiscriminately recruited. ... The technical merits of this film outweigh the virtues of its plot material. But good use is made of the central theme, and scenes of light comedy are pleasantly alternated with the more criminal activities."

The Monthly Film Bulletin wrote: "The film contains mystery and humour, but fails in 'putting across' the full possibilities of the plot."

The Daily Film Renter wrote: "The story is somewhat involved but easily followed. ... Unpretentious but interesting quota booking."

Picturegoer wrote: "Weak in dialogue, this picture, which deals with a jewel that carries a curse and brings about the death of a French gangster, has some dramatic moments, but on the whole its technical qualities are stronger than its story. Stewart Rome acts in full melodramatic spirit as the gangster ... Julie Suedo conveys the necessary glamour as the dancer and Vesta Victoria shows herself as the possessor of a good sense of characterisation in the role of a fatuous dowager."

In British Sound Films: The Studio Years 1928–1959 David Quinlan rated the film as "poor", writing: "Hilariously bad thriller."
