= Bell-Bottom George =

1944 British film by Marcel Varnel

- Original theatrical poster
- Directed by: Marcel Varnel
- Written by: Edward Dryhurst; Peter Fraser; John L. Arthur; Richard Fisher; Peter Creswell
- Produced by: Marcel Varnel
- Starring: George Formby; Anne Firth; Reginald Purdell
- Cinematography: Basil Emmott; Roy Fogwell
- Edited by: Max Brenner
- Music by: Harry Bidgood
- Production company: Columbia (British) Productions
- Distributed by: Columbia Pictures
- Release date: 7 February 1944
- Running time: 97 minutes
- Country: United Kingdom
- Language: English
- Box office: £132,235 (UK)

Bell-Bottom George is a 1944 black-and-white British comedy musical film directed by Marcel Varnel, starring George Formby and Anne Firth. It was written by Edward Dryhurst, Peter Fraser, John L. Arthur, Richard Fisher and Peter Creswell.

A wartime morale booster, it features the songs "Swim Little Fish", "It Serves You Right", "If I Had A Girl Like You" and "Bell Bottom George." Future Carry On star Charles Hawtrey appears in a small role.

The film title derives from the bell-bottom trousers which form part of the Royal Navy uniform.

== Plot ==
Anti-British agents plan an attack on a Royal Navy ship.

Jim Bennett is a sailor who has overstayed his shore leave. He explains he was a boxer and if hit in one side he sleeps for 24 hours but if hit on the other he wakes.

Meanwhile, George Blake serves drinks to officers in a gentlemen's club. They chastise him for his poor service and say he should join the Navy. George retires to his room in the club where he chats to his goldfish Egbert.

During an air raid George is out with Jim and for various reasons is wearing his uniform. Jim gets knocked out and is trying to "revive" him by hitting him on the other side. The military police spot him and think he is both attacking Jim and that he is absent without leave. From then he is mistaken for the absent Jim. He has borrowed his to go to a Lock-in at a pub. George is spotted by military police who think he is AWOL and escort him back to Naval barracks.

He impresses the sailors there with his song "It Serves You Right - You Shouldn't Have Joined" whilst playing ukulele, and is chosen to play at the "Spick and Span" troop radio concert in London. He meets Pat, a Wren, here, and they start to fall in love. He takes her to a dance and sings "If I Had a Girl Like You" to her.

In the same period, he stumbles on the aforementioned pair of Nazi spies using a taxidermists shop as a front, and foils their plot to blow up a British submarine, "The Firefly". He also impresses and wins the heart of Pat, the Wren he has fallen for.

When the real Bennett fully recovers in hospital he panics that he is absent without leave and runs into the two military police who have been harassing the false Bennett. George passes and they give chase. He meets Pat in a car and they think they have escaped, but the group chasing them flag down a police car. They drive to harbour and steal a small launch but the others also steal a boat and the chase continues until George's boat is wrecked.

== Cast ==
- George Formby as George Blake
- Anne Firth as Pat
- Reginald Purdell as Birdie Edwards
- Peter Murray-Hill as Shapley
- Manning Whiley as Church
- Hugh Dempster as White
- Dennis Wyndham as Black
- Charles Farrell as Jim Bennett
- Eliot Makeham as Johnson
- Peter Gawthorne as Admiral Sir William Coltham
- Jane Welsh as Rita
- Harry Fowler as delivery boy
- Ian Fleming as Lt. Commander Carter
- Charles Hawtrey as BBC Radio man
- Frank Atkinson as Harry, the barman

== Reception ==
=== Box office ===
According to trade papers, the film was a success at the British box office in 1944. Kinematograph Weekly said it was one of the most popular films at the British box office in January 1944.

=== Critical ===
The Monthly Film Bulletin wrote: "For those who like Formby getting into scrapes and singing three or four songs, direction, production and supporting cast do not greatly matter – which in this case is just as well."

Kinematograph Weekly wrote: "Bright and, for the most part, lively Navy musical comedy extravaganza, with up-to date espionage trimmings, concerning the successful snooping of a goofy but good hearted mess attendant. The tale hits both smooth and rough water, but George Formby improvises effectively whatever the conditions."

Halliwell's Film Guide called it a "formula star comedy, too long and too familiar".

TV Guide commented: "an overlong launching for an unseaworthy production."
