= The Woman from China =

1930 film

- Opening titles
- Directed by: Edward Dryhurst
- Written by: George Dewhurst; Edward Dryhurst
- Produced by: Edward G. Whiting
- Starring: Julie Suedo; Gibb McLaughlin
- Production company: Edward G. Whiting Productions
- Distributed by: Jury Metro-Goldwyn
- Release date: March 1930
- Running time: 81 minutes
- Country: United Kingdom
- Language: English

The Woman from China is a 1930 British crime film directed by Edward Dryhurst and starring Julie Suedo, Gibb McLaughlin and Frances Cuyler. It was written by George Dewhurst and Dryhurst, and shot at Isleworth Studios as a quota quickie.

== Plot ==
Crooked Chinese shipping businessman Chang-Li is involved in smuggling weapons from England into China. He has desires on Celia Thorburn, an English girl engaged to Lieutenant Jack Halliday, and uses Laloe, a Chinese woman, to distract Halliday, so he can steal Celia away from him. But Halliday discovers the smuggled arms and outwits Chang-Li.

== Cast ==
- Julie Suedo as Laloe Berchmans
- Gibb McLaughlin as Chung-Li
- Frances Cuyler as Celia Thorburn
- Tony Wylde as Lieutenant Jack Halliday
- Kiyoshi Takase as Ah Wong
- R. Byron Webber as Mr Berchmans
- George Wynn as officer
- Clifford Pembroke as Snell
- Laurie Leslie as Garcia
- Ian Wilson as cabin boy

== Reception ==
Film Weekly wrote: "The film is poorly constructed and painfully rambling. The acting is quite good. Too 'typically quota' to be entertaining."

Kine Weekly wrote: "Old-fashioned and highly coloured Chinese mystery melodrama, which is quite well characterised, but needs to be re-edited and drastically condensed before it can be recommended as a popular quota offering. Gibb McLaughlin gives a clever study as Chang Li, and does all that is possible to bring conviction to the story. ... The characterisation generally is not at all bad, and the sensational episodes are well handled, but the producer, Edward Dryhurst, keeps drifting away from the fundamentals, with the result that the drama rambles and runs to unnecessary length."
