= Monroe Silver =

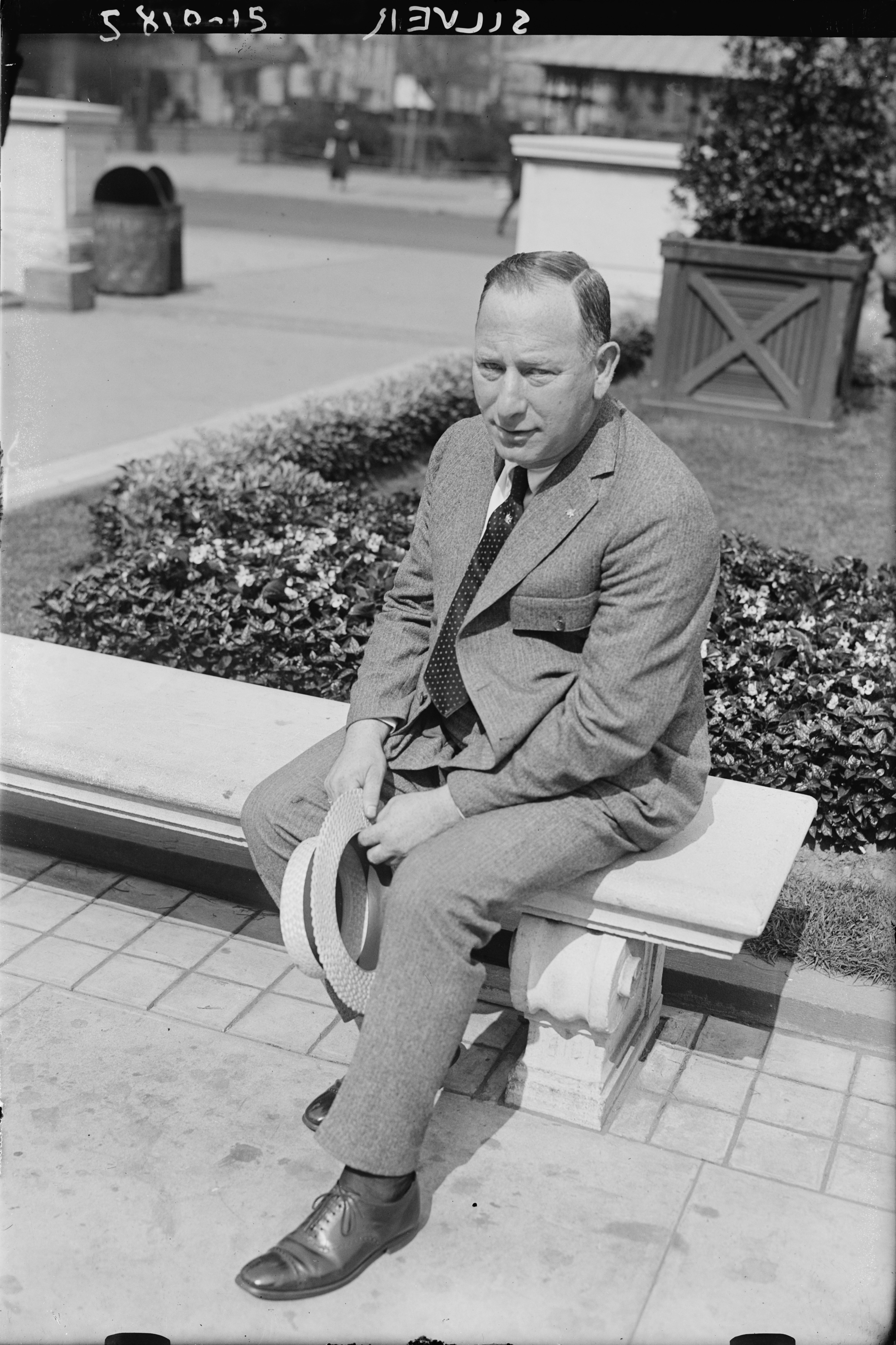
- Silver c. 1922

Background information
- Born: December 21, 1875
- Died: May 3, 1947 (aged 71)
- Occupations: Actor, Singer, Comedian
- Labels: Regal Records, Columbia

Monroe Silver (December 21, 1875 – May 3, 1947) was an American actor and singer who was also a comedian and monologist using a Jewish dialect-accent in his performances.

== Career ==
For various record labels, he recorded 78rpm discs of parodies like "Cohen on the Telephone" and "Cohen Phones to His Friend Levy". Joe Hayman first recorded the monologue "Cohen on the Telephone" in London in July 1913 for Regal Records and released in the U.S. by Columbia Records.

Lee De Forest recorded Silver doing "Cohen on the Telephone" for the DeForest Phonofilm sound-on-film process. The film premiered as Monroe Silver, Famed Monologist with 17 other Phonofilm short films at the Rivoli Theater in New York City on 15 April 1923. This film is now in the Maurice Zouary collection at the Library of Congress. From 1925 to 1935, Silver appeared on The Goodrich Silvertown Orchestra radio show.

With Silver's Jewish/Yiddish accent, words like "What are you doing?" came out as "Vot arrr you doink?" Some performers like Barney Bernard and Louis Mann tried to imitate him in the early 1920s, while Silver himself adapted the monologues of British vaudevillian Joe Hayman and others. Silver made many recordings with Billy Murray, as an Irish and Jewish dialect combo "Casey and Cohen". Their last recording together was on February 11, 1943, for Beacon Records.

== See also ==
- Jewish humor

== Bibliography ==
- Corenthal, Michael G., Cohen on the Telephone: Jewish Humor and Dialect (Yesterday's Memories, 1984)
- Silver, Monroe, Monroe Silver's Famous "Cohen on the Telephone" and Over One Hundred Original Jokes, Stories, Etc. (New York: Irving Berlin, 1927)
- Whitburn, Joel, Joel Whitburn's Pop Memories 1890-1954: The History of American Popular Music (Menomonee Falls, Wisconsin: Record Research, Inc., 1986)
