= Heroes of the Mine (1932 film) =

1932 film

- Film tie-in story, Boy's Cinema (26 November, 1932)
- Directed by: Widgey R. Newman
- Written by: Geoffrey Clarke
- Produced by: Geoffrey Clarke
- Starring: Moore Marriott; Wally Patch; Terence de Marney
- Production company: Delta-Film
- Distributed by: Butcher's Film Service
- Release date: 28 November 1932
- Running time: 48 minutes
- Country: United Kingdom
- Language: English

Heroes of the Mine is a lost 1932 British drama film directed by Widgey R. Newman and starring Moore Marriott, Wally Patch and Terence de Marney. It was written by Geoffrey Clarke, and made as a quota quickie at Bushey Studios.

== Preservation status ==
The British Film Institute National Archive holds no stills or ephemera, and no film or video materials.

== Plot ==
Blasting operations in the a mine cause a roof collapse which imprisons a gang of miners. One of the men confesses that years before he committed a theft and framed another man. That man turns out to be one of the entombed men.

== Cast ==
- Moore Marriott as Gaffer
- Wally Patch as Bob
- Terence de Marney as youngster
- John Milton as Taffy
- Eric Adeney as Timberman
- Agnes Brantford as Mrs. Latham
- Ian Wilson as ponyboy

== Reception ==
Picturegoer wrote: Moore Marriott ... gives a sincere characterisation, as do all the rest of the cast. The mining-town scenes are true to type and the effect of realism has been well attained."

Picture Show wrote: "Simple, sombre story ... Technically accurate backgrounds, competent acting, and straightforward direction."
