= Men Without Honour =

- Directed by: Widgey R. Newman
- Written by: George A. Cooper; Alexander George
- Produced by: Bernard Smith; Widgey R. Newman
- Starring: Ian Fleming; Howard Douglas; Charles Paton; Grace Arnold
- Cinematography: John Miller
- Edited by: Violet Burdon
- Production companies: Smith & Newman Productions
- Distributed by: Equity British Films
- Release date: March 1939
- Running time: 59 minutes
- Country: United Kingdom
- Language: English

Men Without Honour is a 1939 British crime film directed by Widgey R. Newman and starring Ian Fleming, Howard Douglas and Grace Arnold. It was written by George A. Cooper and Alexander George, and made at Bushey Studios as a quota quickie.

== Synopsis ==
A disgraced lawyer ends up working for a gang of share-pushers. He becomes outraged when he discovers that they are scamming his son's prospective father-in-law and eventually unmasks the villains with the help of the police.

== Cast ==
- Ian Fleming as Frank Hardy
- Howard Douglas as Fane
- W.T. Hodge as Vigor
- Charles Paton as Rev. Fanshawe
- Grace Arnold as Mrs. Hardy
- Alastair Hunter as John Hardy
- Edith Clinton as Enid Fanshawe
- Charles Courtney as Field
- Tony Melrose as Commissioner
- George Dewhurst as Inspector Smith
- Rex Alderman as Barclay

== Reception ==
The Monthly Film Bulletin wrote: "This film is a reflection of the American war-on-crime film, with the difference that in this case the police are combating share-pushers instead of gangsters. Though many of the facts and situations may be authentic, the very unconvincing acting and the forced dialogue appear so melodramatic, that one can only treat the film, for entertainment's sake, as a parody."

Kine Weekly wrote: "The principal players make the most of the material at their disposal, and the presentation is adequate. Useful British supporting proposition for the not too sophisticated."
