= Calling All Ma's =

1937 British film by Redd Davis

- Directed by: Redd Davis
- Written by: Al Booth
- Produced by: Ivor McLaren
- Starring: Billy Caryll; Hilda Mundy; Margaret Yarde; Julian Vedey
- Cinematography: Roy Kellino
- Edited by: Reginald Beck
- Production company: 20th Century Fox
- Distributed by: 20th Century Fox
- Release date: March 1937
- Running time: 49 minutes
- Country: United Kingdom
- Language: English

Calling All Ma's (also known as The Biter Bit) is a 1937 British comedy film directed by Redd Davis and starring Billy Caryll, Hilda Mundy and Margaret Yarde. It was made at Wembley Studios by 20th Century Fox's British subsidiary, for release as a quota quickie.

== Plot ==
Browbeaten clerk Billy Smith returns home to find his wife Hilda's overbearing mother has moved in. Billy whisks Hilda away to a desert island. After three peaceful years there, the mother-in-law unexpectedly arrives.

== Cast ==
- Billy Caryll as Billy Smith
- Hilda Mundy as Hilda Smith
- Margaret Yarde as ma-in-law
- Anthony Shaw as Arthur Parkins
- Julian Vedey as Italian
- Charles Castella as barman

== Reception ==
The Monthly Film Bulletin wrote: "A dull farce. There are more hoary jokes in this film than can have been collected together for some time: mother-in-law, false teeth, shrewish wife and drunken friend, all have their share. ... The end of the story is sudden and absurd even for farce. The direction is jerky. The cast, which includes Margaret Yarde as 'ma-in-law,' do their best."

Kine Weekly wrote: "A music-hall sketch clumsily magnified to feature dimensions. The co-stars are starved of material, and on top of this the production qualities are incredibly cheap. There is hardly a laugh in the entire film. ... It is no more than a dreary duologue put over principally by drunks against a domestic background of pathetic unpretentiousness. It is useless except as a possible quota proposition for cheap industrial halls."
