= Grace Arnold =

English actress (1894–1979)

- 1939 Spotlight photo
- Born: Georgiana Louise Iverson; 19 September 1894; London, England
- Died: 26 February 1979 (aged 84); London, England
- Years active: 1939–1975
- Spouse: Ralph Morgan

Grace Arnold (19 September 1894 – 26 February 1979) was an English actress, born Georgiana Louise Iverson, in London. Available records have her first appearing on the British stage in 1921 and transitioning to film in 1939. In 1910, at age 16, she had married the American actor Ralph Morgan (1883-1956) and, the following year, gave birth to their daughter, the actress Claudia Morgan (1911-1974). She was known for being effective in cameo roles, and for playing Mrs. Hudson in the 1968 season of the television series Sherlock Holmes.

== Stage appearances ==
- The Borderer 1921-1923
- The Marlboroughs 1923-1925
- The Farmer’s Wife 1927
- The Constant Nymph 1927-1928
- The Misdoings of Charley Peace 1929-1930
- Call It a Day (play)|Call It a Day 1936-1937
- The Blue Goose 1941
- Jupiter Laughs 1941
- Angel 1947
- Hyacinth 1953
- Mary Stuart 1960-1961

== Filmography ==
- Men Without Honour (1939) - Mrs. Hardy
- Crimes at the Dark House (1940) - Maid (uncredited)
- Spare a Copper (1940) - Music Shop Customer (uncredited)
- Went the Day Well? (1942) - Mrs. Owen
- The Gentle Sex (1943) - Restaurant attendant (uncredited)
- The Bells Go Down (1943) - Canteen Lady (uncredited)
- The Lamp Still Burns (1943) - Sister Grace Annie Sprock (uncredited)
- The Way Ahead (1944) - Mrs. Fletcher
- Give Me the Stars (1945) - Mrs. Gossage
- Johnny Frenchman (1945) - Mrs. Matthews
- Painted Boats (1945) - His Sister
- The Trojan Brothers (1946) - Mrs. Johnson
- They Knew Mr. Knight (1946) - Isabel Blake
- The Captive Heart (1946) - Official (uncredited)
- I'll Turn to You (1946) - Nurse (uncredited)
- Hue and Cry (1947) - Dicky's Mother
- The Loves of Joanna Godden (1947) - Martha
- Jassy (1947) - Housemaid
- Dusty Bates (1947) - Mrs. Ford
- It Always Rains on Sunday (1947) - Ted's Landlady
- My Brother Jonathan (1948) - Woman in Court
- House of Darkness (1948) - Tessa
- Love in Waiting (1948) - Emily Baxter
- The History of Mr. Polly (1949) - Mrs. Rusper (uncredited)
- Passport to Pimlico (1949) - Pompous Woman
- The Man from Yesterday (1949) - Mrs. Amersley
- Old Mother Riley's New Venture (1949) - Prison Governor
- Dark Secret (1949) - Housewife (uncredited)
- Dance Hall (1950) - Mrs. Bennett
- The Magnet (1950) - Mrs. Mercer
- Portrait of Clare (1950) - Lady Astill
- Life in Her Hands (1951) - Children's Sister
- Hunted (1952) - Woman in Courtyard
- Brandy for the Parson (1952) - Landlady
- Love's a Luxury (1952) - Mrs. Harris
- Circumstantial Evidence (1952) - Mrs. Jolly
- Escape Route (1952) - Neighbour (uncredited)
- Those People Next Door (1953) - Lady Diana Stevens
- Eight O'Clock Walk (1954) - Mrs. Higgs
- Souls in Conflict (1954)
- Children Galore (1955) - Mrs. Gedge (uncredited)
- Barbados Quest (1955) - Lady Hawksley
- The Secret Tent (1956) - Miss Pearce
- Child in the House (1956) - Mrs. Groves
- Town on Trial (1957) - Club Committee Woman
- High Flight (1957) - Commandant's Wife
- Violent Playground (1958) - Customer in Grocers Shop (uncredited)
- Innocent Sinners (1958) - Miss Roberts (uncredited)
- Sapphire (1959) - Sapphire's Landlady (uncredited)
- Crash Drive (1959) - Mrs. Dixon
- Make Mine Mink (1960) - Orphanage Matron (uncredited)
- Konga (1961) - Miss Barnesdell
- Attempt to Kill (1961) - Housekeeper
- I Thank a Fool (1962) - 2nd Wardress (uncredited)
- Playback (1962) - Miss Wilson
- The Mind Benders (1963) - Train Passenger (uncredited)
- A Jolly Bad Fellow (1964) - 2nd Lady
- Five Have a Mystery to Solve (1964)
- The Heroes of Telemark (1965) - Passenger on 'Galtesund' (uncredited)
- Sky West and Crooked (1966) - Village Woman
- Diamonds for Breakfast (1968) - Museum Visitor with Red Hat (uncredited)
