= Her Wild Oat =

1927 film by Marshall Neilan

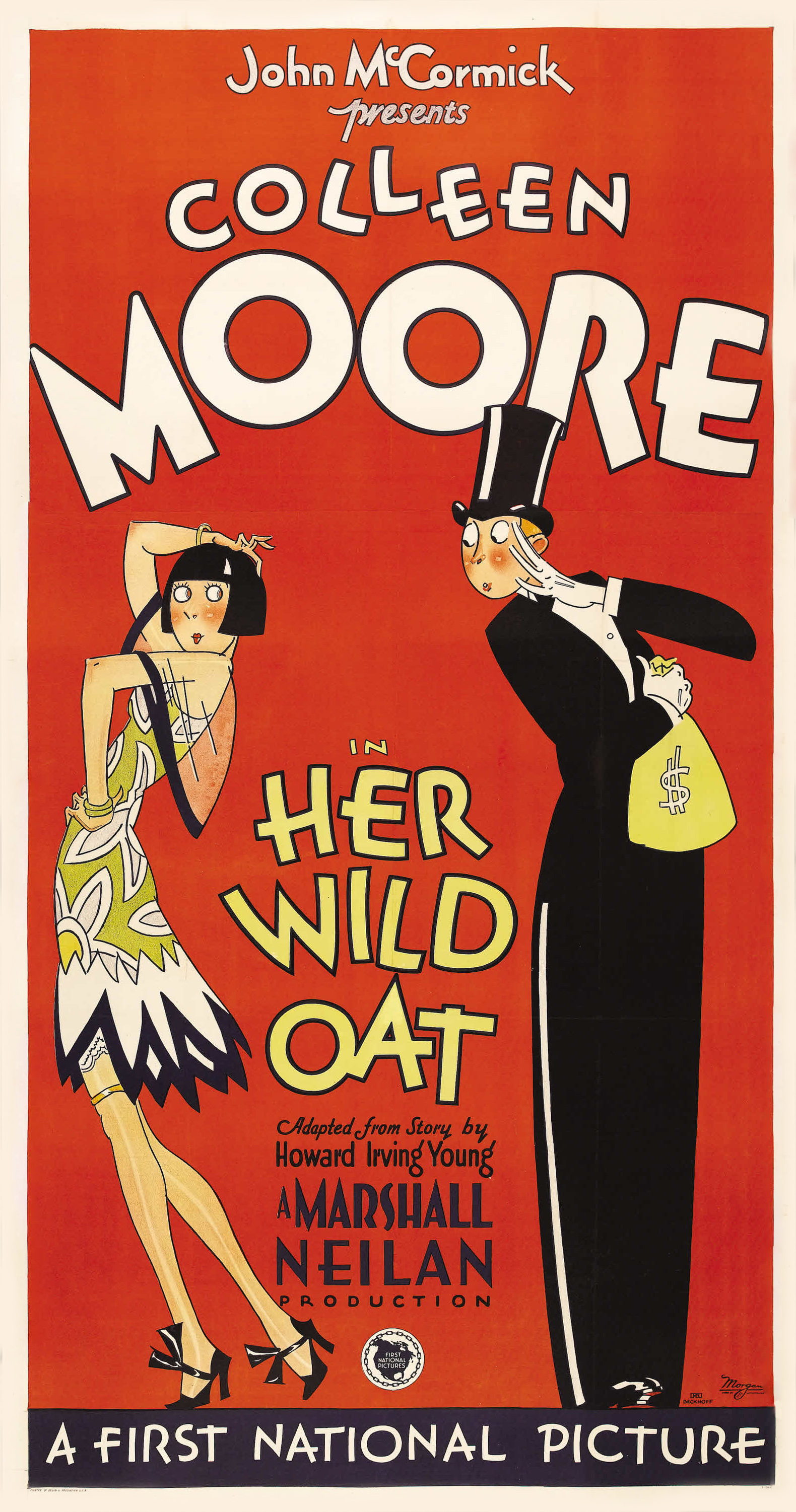
- Film poster
- Directed by: Marshall Neilan
- Written by: Gerald C. Duffy; George Marion Jr. (titles)
- Story by: Howard Irving Young
- Produced by: John McCormick
- Starring: Colleen Moore
- Cinematography: George J. Folsey
- Edited by: Alexander Hall
- Distributed by: First National Pictures
- Release date: December 25, 1927
- Running time: 70 minutes
- Country: United States
- Language: Silent (English intertitles)
- Budget: $350,000

Scene from the film.

Her Wild Oat is a 1927 American silent comedy film made by First National Pictures, directed by Marshall Neilan, and starring Colleen Moore. The screenplay was written by Gerald C. Duffy, based on a story by Howard Irving Young.

== Cast ==
- Colleen Moore as Mary Lou Smith
- Larry Kent as Philip Latour
- Hallam Cooley as Tommy Warren
- Gwen Lee as Daisy
- Martha Mattox as Dowager
- Charles Giblyn as Duke Latour
- Julanne Johnston as Miss Whitley

== Production ==
This was Moore's first film after a contract dispute between her, her husband John McCormick, and her studio First National caused the couple to suddenly leave California for New York, with the intentions of making films either with another studio or going overseas. Their problems were solved and Her Wild Oat was made upon her return. Originally they had planned to make Synthetic Sin, but it was necessary to complete the film quickly. Her Wild Oat was a simple story (originally racier until rewritten by Neilan to play up the comic aspects), and could be shot entirely in California, mostly on location and using existing sets. The resort scenes were filmed at the Hotel del Coronado in California; though the film states it is located in Plymouth Beach, Rhode Island, palm trees can be seen in scenes set there. Colleen wrote in Silent Star that her husband, a heavy drinker, had decided to re-edit the film while Colleen was on vacation. She returned to find the tops of all the gags had been removed.

It was Moore's second film directed by Marshall Neilan, the first being Dinty (1920). Marshall also produced Social Register (1934) with Moore, one of her last four films before retiring from Hollywood.

== Preservation ==
Her Wild Oat was thought to be lost but a copy was found by Hugh Neely in the Czech National Film Archive in Prague in 2001 and subsequently restored by the Academy Film Archive.
