= Two Smart Men =

- Leslie Fuller and Wally Patch in the film
- Directed by: Widgey R. Newman
- Written by: Widgey R. Newman
- Produced by: Widgey R. Newman
- Starring: Leslie Fuller; Wally Patch; Margaret Yarde
- Production company: Widgey R. Newman Productions
- Distributed by: Equity British Films
- Release date: 1940
- Running time: 52 minutes
- Country: United Kingdom
- Language: English

Two Smart Men is a 1940 British second feature ('B') comedy film directed, written and produced by Widgey R. Newman and starring Leslie Fuller, Wally Patch and Margaret Yarde.

== Plot ==
Jimmy gets an invitation from his old friend Henry Smith, to keep him company while his wife is off on a cruise, with his sister Lavinia being left in charge of the house. Social-climbing Lavinia arranges a dinner party and invites a Duchess to meet a new designer. But the latter is a crook, only after the Duchess's jewels.

== Cast ==
- Leslie Fuller as Jimmy
- Wally Patch as Wally
- Margaret Yarde as Mrs. Smith
- Pamela Bevan as Pamela
- George Turner as Henry Smith

== Reception ==
The Monthly Film Bulletin wrote: "There is a good deal of knockabout farce, comic situations and misunderstandings, but the result is only slightly funny. Neither acting nor dialogue is on a high level."

Kine Weekly wrote: "The story covers a lot of territory, and also introduces a new and promising juvenile star in Pamela Bevan, but wide as its scope is it is not, unfortunately, always accompanied by a corresponding number of laughs. ... Still, misleading, haphazard and disjointed as it is, the film is not without popular horseplay. ... Leslie Fuller works hard as Jimmy, and in spite of the part scores a fair number of laughs. Wally Patch and Margaret arde are Wally and Mrs. Smith, but seldom, if ever, have co-stars been dismissed with such inconspicuous roles."
