= Edward Dryhurst =

English film director, producer, and writer (1904–1989)

Edward Dryhurst (1904–1989) was an English screenwriter, film producer and director. He was the father of British-American film producer, director, and author Michael Dryhurst.

== Selected filmography ==
Screenwriter

- Three Men in a Cart (1929)
- Find the Lady (1936)
- The End of the Road (1936)
- Jennifer Hale (1937)
- East of Ludgate Hill (1937)
- Double Alibi (1937)
- Flying Fortress (1942)
- Bell Bottom George (1943)
- The Man from Morocco (1945)
- Master of Bankdam (1947)
- Castle in the Air (1952)
- It's Never Too Late (1956)
- Stranger in Town (1957)

Director

- The Woman from China (1930)
- Commissionaire (1933)
