= Castle Sinister =

1932 British film by Widgey R. Newman

- Review of the film in The Bioscope (6 April 1932)
- Directed by: Widgey R. Newman
- Written by: Widgey R. Newman
- Produced by: Widgey R. Newman
- Starring: Haddon Mason; Eric Adeney; Wally Patch
- Production company: Delta Pictures
- Distributed by: Filmophone
- Release date: March 1932
- Running time: 50 minutes
- Country: United Kingdom
- Language: English

Castle Sinister is a lost 1932 British horror film produced, written and directed by Widgey R. Newman and starring Haddon Mason and Eric Adeney. It was produced by Delta Pictures and distributed by Filmophone.

== Preservation status ==
The British Film Institute has classed Castle Sinister as a lost film. Its National Archive holds no ephemera, stills or film or video materials.

== Overview ==
The Bioscope (April 1932) outlined the plot as follows:

The story tells of a young man's adventures in a large country mansion with a scientist who is engaged in forwarding his theory that rejuvenation by the transfer of certain glands is more than a possibility. A girl is, of course, involved to supply the necessary love interest, and a misshapen creature, victim of the scientist, supplies the thrills.

== Cast ==
- Haddon Mason as Roland Kemp
- Eric Adeney as Professor Bandov
- Wally Patch as Jorkins
- Ilsa Kilpatrick as Jean
- Edmund Kennedy as father

== Registation and trade shows ==
The film was registered under the Cinematograph act as no. 7129, length 4,410ft."

According to contemporary trade papers, it was trade shown in 1932 in London (24 March), Liverpool (8 April), Manchester (12 April), Newcastle (20 April), Nottingham (21 April) and Glasgow (4 May).

== Reception ==
The Bioscope gave the film's suitability as "For indulgent patrons only" and awarded it a rating of 45%, writing: "This adaptation of a story with a Frankenstein theme is so theatrically staged, poorly mounted and lighted and acted with such amateurism that it never for a moment convinces. ... Widgey R. Newman, who directed, has had recourse to all the stock gags to obtain his eerie atmosphere, amongst which are a constantly howling wind which, by the way, is more fierce in its intensity inside the house than outside, and a generous sprinkling of skulls and skeletons. Haddon Mason, who plays the part of the young man, displays an unusual lack of animation, Eric Adeney, as the professor, overacts considerably, while Isa Kilpatrick gains some little sympathy in the heroine role. The Cockney expressions from Wally Patch are a bright spot. Recording is indifferent, with the voices often appearing entirely detached from the speakers."

In its review of the film Kine Weekly wrote: "A lurid professor and an ape-like monster, the result of the former's experiments in brain grafting, figure in a thriller calculated to raise the hair of not too discriminating patrons. Although the acting is fair, production is weak, and the story not sufticiently convincing to stand on its own merits. ... Eric Adeney delivers his professional jargon with effect, and is quite an asset in working up the thrill. Haddon Mason speaks well as Kemp, though his performance is a trifle wooden. Wally Patch sustains the light relief as an ex-criminal butler. Action is decidedly jerky, and except for its opening sequences at no time convincing. And yet there is a short-lived thrill to be obtained from the character of the ape-like man whose features are cleverly made up. A sinister feeling likewise pervades the character of the professor. Dialogue is generally artificial." The paper also noted the film in its "New films at a glance" column, writing: "Horrible creation of a mad scientist provides a thrill, despite poor story and production. Possible thriller for industrial halls."

The Daily Film Renter wrote: "Weird story of a fanatical scientist, with heavy dramatic atmosphere throughout. ... The story is somewhat meagre, and incredulous as mystery stories are generally, but Haddon Mason as Ronald Kemp acts adequately, and Eric Adeney as Professor Bandov is calculated to supply the thrills. Light relief is supplied by Wally Patch as Jorkins, the butler. A mystery atmosphere pervades throughout, and patrons to whom this fare appeals should be amply satisfied."

In The Stage, Ivan Patrick Gore wrote: "A praiseworthy effort to get away from the usual melodramatic material considered quite satisfactory for serving as quota entertainment. The story is not too strong or original, but it does possess eeriness and suspense value, and has been well handled. ... Capital work is done by Haddon Mason, Eric Adeney, and Wally Patch. Settings and recording are effective."
