= Margaret Yarde =

British actress (1878–1944)

- Yarde (left) with Diana Cotton on set of The Man from Toronto (1933)
- Born: 2 April 1878; Dartmouth, Devon, England
- Died: 11 March 1944 (aged 65); London, England
- Occupation(s): Actress; Opera singer
- Years active: 1913-1944

Margaret Yarde (2 April 1878 – 11 March 1944) was a British stage and film actress. She often played domestics, landladies and mothers.

== Biography ==
Yarde was born on 2 April 1878 in Dartmouth, Devon, England.

Initially training to be an opera singer, she made her London stage debut in 1907. She also became a film actress, often playing domestics, landladies and mothers.

She died on 11 Mar 1944 in London, England, aged 65.

== Filmography ==
- A Cigarette-Maker's Romance (1913) - Woman
- The Only Way (1925) - The Vengeance
- London (1926) - Eliza Critten
- Night Birds (1930) - Mrs. Hallick
- The Woman Between (1931) - Mrs. Robinson
- Uneasy Virtue (1931) - Mrs. Robinson
- Third Time Lucky (1931) - Mrs. Clutterbuck
- Let's Love and Laugh (1931) - Bride's Mother
- Michael and Mary (1931) - Mrs. Tullivant
- The Sign of Four (1932) - Mrs. Smith
- The Good Companions (1933) - Mrs. Mounder
- Enemy of the Police (1933) - Lady Tapleigh
- A Shot in the Dark (1933) - Kate Browne
- The Man from Toronto (1933) - Mrs. Hubbard
- Matinee Idol (1933) - Mrs. Clappit
- Trouble in Store (1934, Short) - Landlady
- Guest of Honour (1934) - Emma Tidmarsh
- Tiger Bay (1934) - Fay
- Nine Forty-Five (1934) - Margaret Clancy
- Sing As We Go (1934) - Mrs. Clotty
- Father and Son (1934) - Victoria
- A Glimpse of Paradise (1934) - Mrs. Kidd
- The Broken Rosary (1934) - Nanny
- Widow's Might (1935) - Cook
- Handle with Care (1935) - Mrs. Tunbody
- Who's Your Father (1935) - Mrs. Medway
- That's My Uncle (1935) - Mrs. Frisbee
- 18 Minutes (1935) - Marie
- Full Circle (1935) - Agatha
- Jubilee Window (1935) - Mrs. Holroyd
- It Happened in Paris (1935) - Marthe
- Squibs (1935) - Mrs. Lee
- The Crouching Beast (1935) - Bar owner
- The Deputy Drummer (1935) - Lady Sylvester
- Man of the Moment (1935) - Landlady
- Scrooge (1935) - Scrooge's Laundress
- Queen of Hearts (1936) - Mrs. Porter
- Faithful (1936) - Mrs. Kemp
- In the Soup (1936) - Mrs. Bates
- Gypsy Melody (1936) - Grand Duchess
- No Escape (1936) - Bunty
- Beauty and the Barge (1937) - Mrs. Porter
- Secret Lives (1937) - Bakery Customer (uncredited)
- The Compulsory Wife (1937) - Mrs. Thackery
- Merry Comes to Town (1937) - (uncredited)
- French Leave (1937) - Mme. Dernaux
- You Live and Learn (1937) - Mrs. Biddle
- Calling All Ma's (1937) - Ma-in-Law
- Prison Without Bars (1938) - Mlle. Artemise
- You're the Doctor (1939) - Mrs. Taggart
- The Face at the Window (1939) - La Pinan
- French Without Tears (1940) - Marianne
- Crimes at the Dark House (1940) - Mrs. Bullen
- The Second Mr. Bush (1940) - (uncredited)
- Henry Steps Out (1940) - Cynthia Smith
- George and Margaret (1940) - Cook
- Two Smart Men (1940) - Mrs. Smith
- Tomorrow We Live (1943) - Fauntel
- Thursday's Child (1943) - Mrs. Chard
- It's in the Bag (1944) - Landlady (uncredited)
