= Inquest (1931 British film) =

1931 film

- Frame from the film
- Directed by: G.B. Samuelson
- Written by: Michael Barringer
- Produced by: E. Gordon Craig
- Starring: Campbell Gullan; Mary Glynne; Haddon Mason
- Production company: Majestic Film Company
- Distributed by: First National Film Distributors
- Release date: 16 December 1931
- Running time: 95 minutes
- Country: United Kingdom
- Language: English

Inquest is a 1931 British crime film directed by G.B. Samuelson and starring Campbell Gullan, Mary Glynne, Haddon Mason and Sidney Morgan. It was written by Michael Barringer based on his 1932 play, which was adapted for film again in 1939.

== Preservation status ==
The British Film Institute National Archive holds a collection of ephemera but no film or video materials.

== Synopsis ==
Widow Margaret Hamilton enlists the support of a King's Counsel to help clear herself of the accusation, by a suspicious coroner, that she had murdered her husband.

== Cast ==
- Mary Glynne as Margaret Hamilton
- Campbell Gullan as Norman Dennison KC
- Sidney Morgan as Coroner
- Haddon Mason as Richard Hanning
- G. H. Mulcaster as Charles Wyatt
- Lena Halliday as Mrs Wyatt
- Peter Coleman as Mr Hamilton
- Reginald Tippett as Mr Denton Hume

== Reception ==
Film Weekly wrote: "There is the germ of a gripping murder filly in Inquest ... But the germ dies early in the story, killed by rambling direction, slowness of development, and imperfect statement of facts. ... A film with some good moments, but hardly one which will have more than a limited appeal."

Kine Weekly wrote: "The author's original play has not been improved by the early embellishments, which are both tedious and superficial, and one's patience is nearly exhausted before the inquest scenes. These episodes, however, are presented with fair conviction, and this is where the drama lies. The picture definitely has possibilities, but drastic pruning is necessary before they can reach the light of day."

The Daily Film Renter wrote: "Rather unsuitable talkie material, the 'written in' prologue being uninteresting. What punch there is is confined chiefly to the inquest scenes, which tend to become monotonous. Both Campbell Gullen and Mary Glynne acted better in the play. Everybody else seems mike-conscious. A fair proposition for audiences who will take a lot of talk without much action."
