= Claude Bailey =

British actor (1895–1950)

As Councillor Oxbold in He Snoops to Conquer (1944)

Claude Bailey (19 November 1895 – 22 March 1950) was a British actor. He was born and died in London.

== Partial filmography ==
- Little Waitress (1932)
- The Unholy Quest (1934)
- The Saint Meets the Tiger (1941)
- Hatter's Castle (1942)
- Unpublished Story (1942)
- The Saint Meets the Tiger (1943)
- He Snoops to Conquer (1944)
- Don't Take It to Heart (1944)
- The Hundred Pound Window (1944)
- Bedelia (1946)
- The Calendar (1948)
- Elizabeth of Ladymead (1948)
