= The Unholy Quest =

- Directed by: Widgey R. Newman
- Written by: Widgey R. Newman
- Produced by: Widgey R. Newman; Albert Hopkins; Reginald H. Wyer
- Starring: Claude Bailey; Terence de Marney; Christine Adrian
- Cinematography: Reginald H. Wyer
- Production companies: Newman, Wyler and Hopkins
- Distributed by: Equity British Films
- Release date: 27 March 1934
- Running time: 57 minutes
- Country: United Kingdom
- Language: English

The Unholy Quest is a 1934 British horror film directed by Widgey R. Newman (as R. W. Lotinga) and starring Claude Bailey, Terence de Marney and Christine Adrian. It was written by Newman, and made as a quota quickie.

== Preservation status ==
The British Film Institute National Archive holds no stills or ephemera, and no film or video materials.

== Plot ==
Professor Sorotoff is conducting experiments to prove his theory that the dead can be brought back to life. He hires Frank Davis, a destitute doctor, as his laboratory assistant. Davis falls in love with Sorotoff's ward, Vera. When the professor begins to successfully restore life to a crusader, dead for 800 years, Vera suddenly interrupts the experiment by throwing a jar of acid to the floor. The professor suffers a fatal heart attack, and he dies regretting that his gruesome experiments had ever been attempted.

== Cast ==
- Claude Bailey as Professor Sorotoff
- Terence de Marney as Frank Davis
- Christine Adrian as Vera Manners
- John A. Milton as Hawkins
- Harry Terry as Soapy
- Ian Wilson as Wilky

== Reception ==
Kine Weekly wrote: "There are dramatic moments in this picture, which secures its best effects in the concluding scenes. ... Claude Bailey is impressive at times as the professor, but does not sustain the characterisation quite as successfully as one might wish. ... R. Lotinga's direction is seen at its best in the final scenes, in which eeeriness and suspense are well attained."
