= Inquest (1939 film) =

1939 British film by Roy Boulting

- Opening titles
- Directed by: Roy Boulting
- Written by: Francis Miller
- Based on: Inquest by Michael Barringer
- Produced by: John Boulting
- Starring: Elizabeth Allan; Herbert Lomas; Hay Petrie; Barbara Everest
- Cinematography: D.P. Cooper
- Edited by: Roy Boulting
- Music by: Charles Brill
- Production company: Charter Film Productions
- Distributed by: Grand National Pictures
- Release date: December 1939
- Running time: 60 minutes
- Country: United Kingdom
- Language: English

Inquest is a 1939 British crime film directed by Roy Boulting and starring Elizabeth Allan, Herbert Lomas, Hay Petrie and Barbara Everest. It was based on the play Inquest by Michael Barringer which had previously been adapted as Inquest in 1931. The film was a quota quickie made at Highbury Studios to be used as a supporting feature.

== Plot ==
A young widow is accused of murder and enlists the support of a King's Counsel to help prove her innocence.

== Cast ==
- Elizabeth Allan as Margaret Hamilton
- Herbert Lomas as Thomas Knight
- Hay Petrie as Stephen Neale
- Barbara Everest as Mrs. Wyatt
- Olive Sloane as Lily Prudence
- Philip Friend as Richard Neale KC
- Harold Anstruther as Sir. Denton Hulme
- Malcolm Morley as Doctor Macfarlane

== Critical reception ==
The Monthly Film Bulletin wrote: "This unpretentious film has a somewhat involved plot, but it maintains suspense, has interesting scenes in a Coroner's Court, and crisp dialogue. The acting of the three leading players is good. Elizabeth Allan makes an appealing heroine, while the duel between Herbert Lomas as the Coroner and Hay Petrie as the K.C. is effectively put over. The settings are mainly of the Coroner's Court, which is satisfactorily presented."

Kinematograph Weekly wrote: "Crime drama of purpose and ingenuity set for the most part in a coroner's court in a small English town. ... The brunt of the acting responsibility is shared by Herbert Lomas as the coroner and Hay Petrie as the KC. The duels between these two are, in fact, the picture. ...Brief and unpretentious as the picture is, it has the punch of the thriller, together with dialogue that would not disgrace a debate. Its compass gives it universal appeal".

In British Sound Films: The Studio Years 1928–1959 David Quinlan rated the film as "average", writing: "Standard courtroom mystery adequately maintains its tension."

TV Guide concluded, "not bad as courtroom dramas go. This was the first attempt by the Boulting brothers to give higher production values to programmer filmmaking."
