= Dusty Bates =

1947 British film by Darrell Catling

- Opening titles
- Directed by: Darrel Catling
- Written by: Michael Barringer
- Produced by: Geoffrey Barkas
- Starring: Anthony Newley; Billie Brook; Michael McKeag
- Edited by: Enid Mansell
- Music by: Jack Beaver
- Production company: Gainsborough Studios
- Release date: 1947
- Running time: 25 minutes per episode
- Country: United Kingdom
- Language: English

Dusty Bates is a 1947 British children's film serial, directed by Darrell Catling and starring Anthony Newley and Ronald Shiner. It was written by Michael Barringer and produced by Gaumont-British Instructional and Children's Entertainment Films. The film was also presented by The Rank Organisation. The story was filmed in five parts. The film score was by Jack Beaver.

== Cast ==
- Anthony Newley as Dusty Bates (as Tony Newley)
- Billie Brook as Gill Ford
- Michael McKeag as David Ford
- Grace Arnold as Mrs. Ford
- Bernard Lee as Captain Ford
- Dennis Harkin as Stark
- Ralph Truman as Merryvale
- John Longden as Tod Jenkins
- Toni Arpino as Walrus
- Ronald Shiner as 'Squeaky' Watts
- Wally Patch as Uncle Hank Miller

== DVD release ==
The Adventures of Dusty Bates was released on Region 0 DVD-R by Alpha Video on 28 January 2014.
