= Inquest (play) =

1931 British mystery play

Inquest is a 1931 British mystery play written by Michael Barringer. It was first staged as the Windmill Theatre's first performance in 1931, and was later adapted into films in 1931 and 1939.

A young widow is suspected of murdering her husband by the coroner. To prove her innocence she enlists the help of a leading King's Counsel, who reluctantly agrees to assist her but soon becomes convinced of her innocence. Together they hunt down the real murderer.
