= Little Waitress =

1932 film

- Directed by: Widgey R. Newman
- Produced by: Geoffrey Clarke
- Starring: Claude Bailey; Moore Marriott
- Cinematography: Geoffrey Faithfull
- Production company: Delta-Film
- Distributed by: Ace Films
- Release date: 1932
- Running time: 49 minutes
- Country: United Kingdom
- Language: English

Little Waitress is a 1932 British musical film directed by Widgey R. Newman and starring Claude Bailey and Moore Marriott. It was written by It was made at Bushey Studios as a quota quickie.A romance occurs between an impoverished tourist and a surprisingly wealthy Germany waitress.

== Plot ==
While touring the Rhine Valley, Englishman John Farrell takes a shine to Trudi, a waitress he meets in a café. She is the daughter of Baron Halfsburg, who dislikes all Englishmen, with one exception – John Fulton. So Farrell poses as Fulton, and ultimately the Baron forgives his deception and approves his romance with his daughter.

== Cast ==
- Claude Bailey as John Farrell
- Noel Birkin as student
- Elvi Keene as Trudi
- Moore Marriott as Baron Halfsburg
- Ian Wilson

== Reception ==
Kine Weekly wrote: "Musical entertainment, a romance of the Rhine, with a thin, transparent story, unimaginative treatment, and very ordinary characterisation. The musical numbers have a little melody, but they fail to lift the film from the realms of mediocrity. Very modest second feature entertainment for the uncritical."
