= One Exciting Night (1944 film) =

- Song sheet movie tie-in
- Directed by: Walter Forde
- Written by: Peter Fraser; Howard Irving Young
- Story by: Peter Fraser
- Produced by: Ben Henry
- Starring: Vera Lynn; Donald Stewart; Frederick Leister
- Cinematography: Otto Heller
- Edited by: Terence Fisher
- Music by: Harry Bidgood
- Production company: Columbia Productions
- Distributed by: Columbia Pictures
- Release dates: 4 December 1944 (United Kingdom); 26 July 1945 (United States)
- Running time: 89 minutes
- Country: United Kingdom
- Language: English

One Exciting Night (also known as You Can't Do Without Love) is a 1944 British musical comedy film directed by Walter Forde and starring Vera Lynn, Donald Stewart and Mary Clare. The screenplay was by Peter Fraser and Howard Irving Young and concerns a female singer who becomes involved with a man who is the target of a robbery and murder plot.

== Plot ==
Vera Baker is an aspiring singer desperate for an opportunity to impress producer Michael Thorne. Her chance arrives at a benefit concert that is also the scene of the attempted murder of Thorne by gangsters trying to steal a priceless Rembrandt. Vera somehow eventually thwarts the villains, and along the way manages to wow the audience with her singing.

== Cast ==
- Vera Lynn as Vera Baker
- Donald Stewart as Michael Thorne
- Mary Clare as Mrs. Trout
- Frederick Leister as Hampton
- Phyllis Stanley as Lucille
- Cyril Smith as Joe
- Richard Murdoch as illusionist
- Mavis Villiers as Mabel
- Peggy Anne Clifford as Bessie
- Jeanette Redgrave as Ellen

== Critical reception ==
The Monthly Film Bulletin wrote: "The film gives Vera Lynn many opportunities for singing, which she does better than acting. There are a few thrills and plenty of fun, and admirers of Richard Murdoch will delight in seeing him as a loquacious illusionist. Although an 'A' film it is eminently suited for family entertainment."

Kine Weekly wrote: "The plot is neither tidy nor original, but on the other hand it leaves nothing out. Furthermore, its hectic medley of slapstick, song, cabaret and thick ear, culminating with a spectacular 'safety last' finale, throws into effective and showmanlike relief the engaging versatility of the 'Forces Favourite.' In other words, it's good Vera Lynn."

Leslie Halliwell wrote "Very ho-hum stuff for a very popular but histrionically untried star."

In British Sound Films: The Studio Years 1928–1959 David Quinlan rated the film as "average", writing: "Not unpleasant mixture of thrills, songs and fun."

TV Guide called the film a "decent musical farce."
