= Widgey R. Newman =

British screenwriter, producer, and film director (1900–1944)

- Born: 30 September 1900; Bedford, Bedfordshire, United Kingdom
- Died: 15 July 1944 (aged 43); London, United Kingdom
- Other name: Widgey Raphael Newman
- Occupations: Director, Producer, Writer
- Years active: 1926–1943 (film)

Widgey Raphael Newman (30 September 1900 – 15 July 1944), known professionally as Widgey R. Newman, was a prolific British independent screenwriter, producer and film director. He was a major force in the British film industry of the 1930s, responsible for over 60 films including quota quickie B-films and documentary shorts, many of which are now lost. He was sometimes credited as R. W. Lotinga.

== Career ==
Newman began as a film publicist in the early 1920s, becoming an editor in 1923, and joining DeForest Phonofilms around 1926. He made early sound shorts capturing music-hall acts such as comic John Henry, and went on to direct short features, documentaries, travelogues, and feature-length films. His The Merchant of Venice (1927) is recognised as the first Shakesperian talkie.

== Filmography as director ==
Source: the British Film Institute. ❌ indicates that the BFI National Archive holds no film or video materials.

=== Short films ===
Films of less than 40 minutes duration.

- ❌ Oscillation (1926), co-director: Challis N. Sanderson
- ❌ How I Began (1926), co-director: Challis N. Sanderson
- ❌ The Loud Speaker (1926), co-director: Challis N. Sanderson
- ❌ Listening In (1926), co-director: Challis N. Sanderson
- ❌ John Henry Calling (1926), co-director: Challis N. Sanderson
- ❌ Broadcasting (1926), co-director: Challis N. Sanderson
- ❌ Home Construction (1926), co-director: Challis N. Sanderson
- ❌ The Love of Pthonthnese (1926)
- A Few Melodious Moments from Lawrence Wright's Sensations of 1927 at Onchan Head Pavilion Douglas I.O.M. (1927)
- ❌ John Citizen (1927)
- Edith Sitwell (1927)
- Madalon (1927)
- Hot Water and Vegetabuel (1927)
- The Merchant of Venice (1927)
- ❌ Dot and Carrie (1927)
- ❌ Pop (1927)
- ❌ Dilly and Dally (1927)
- D.O.R.A. (1927)
- Clonk (1928)
- ❌ The Merry Men of Sherwood (1932)
- A Round of Round Faces (1934)
- This Leg Theory (1934)
- ❌ What the Parrot Saw (1935)
- ❌ Lucky Dogs (1935), as R.W. Lotinga
- ❌ Pal o' Mine (1936)
- ❌ What the Puppy Said (1936)
- ❌ This Motoring (1936)
- ❌ Apron Fools (1936)
- ❌ Funeral March of a Marionette (1937)
- ❌ Lullaby (1937)
- River Folk (1937)
- The Heritage of the Soil (1937)
- ❌ Heritage of Defence (1937)
- ❌ The Heritage of the Air (1937)
- ❌ Heritage of the Sea (1937)
- ❌ The Inspector (1937)
- ❌ Horse Sense (1938)
- Pandamonium (1939)
- ❌ Under Dogs (1939)
- ❌ Land o' Clans (1940)
- ❌ London's Got Grit (1940)
- ❌ John Bull's Other Army (1942)
- ❌ In the Sound of Big Ben (1943)
- Strange to Relate (1943)
- The Peke Speaks (1944)
- Road to Yesterday (1944)
- ❌ Chartered Waters (1944)
- ❌ The Four Seasons (1944)
- ❌ The Parrot Goes to Sea (1944)
- The Peke's Sold a Pup (1945)

==== Feature films ====
- ❌ A Reckless Gamble (1928), aka The Man in the Saddle
- ❌ Castle Sinister (1932)
- ❌ Little Waitress (1932)
- ❌ Heroes of the Mine (1932)
- ❌ Lucky Blaze (1933)
- ❌ The Unholy Quest (1934), as R.W. Lotinga
- The Immortal Gentleman (1935)
- The Dream Doctor (1936), as R.W. Lotinga
- ❌ A Sister to Assist 'er (1938), co-director George Dewhurst
- On Velvet (1938) (BFI holdings status pending)
- Men without Honour (1939)
- ❌ Henry Steps Out (1940)
- Two Smart Men (1940)
