= A Heritage of Horror =

1973 book by David Pirie

A Heritage of Horror: The English Gothic Cinema 1946–1972 is a 1973 book written by David Pirie analysing the horror films made by the British film industry and attempting to claim them as a legitimate expression of national culture.

It was the first book on British horror films, a genre which it identified as "the only staple cinematic myth which Britain can properly claim as its own". It was also the first major study of the films of Terence Fisher, who is the subject of an entire chapter.

Special emphasis is placed on the films of Hammer Studios, with additional sections covering Anglo-Amalgamated's "sadean trilogy" (Horrors of the Black Museum, Circus of Horrors and Peeping Tom), Amicus Productions, Don Sharp, John Gilling, Vernon Sewell, British science fiction films, Michael Reeves, and Pirie's thoughts on the possible future of the genre.

A revised edition entitled A New Heritage of Horror: The English Gothic Cinema was published in 2008.
