= I Didn't Do It (film) =

1945 film by Marcel Varnel

- Directed by: Marcel Varnel
- Written by: Stephen Black; Peter Fraser; Norman Lee; Michael Vaughan; Howard Irving Young
- Produced by: Marcel Varnel
- Starring: George Formby
- Cinematography: Roy Fogwell
- Edited by: Douglas Robertson
- Music by: Harry Bidgood
- Production company: Columbia (British) Productions
- Distributed by: Columbia Pictures
- Release date: 6 August 1945
- Running time: 97 minutes
- Country: United Kingdom
- Language: English

I Didn't Do It is a 1945 British comedy crime film directed by Marcel Varnel and starring George Formby, Dennis Wyndham and Carl Jaffe. It was written by Howard Irving Young, Stephen Black, Norman Lee, Peter Fraser and Michael Vaughan.

== Plot ==
A man named George Trotter staying at a theatrical boarding house is framed for a murder.

Stage-struck George Trotter from Manchester arrives at a London theatrical boarding-house. When resident Hilary Vance murders the man in the room next to Trotters, he frames Trotter.

== Cast ==
- George Formby as George Trotter
- Billy Caryll as Tiger Tubbs
- Hilda Mundy as Ma Tubbs
- Gaston Palmer as Le Grand Gaston
- Jack Daly as Terry O'Rourke
- Carl Jaffe as Hilary Vance
- Marjorie Browne as Betty Dickinson
- Wally Patch as Sergeant Carp
- Ian Fleming as Chief Inspector Twyning
- Vincent Holman as Erasmus Montague
- Dennis Wyndham as Tom Driscoll
- Jack Raine as J.B. Cato
- Georgina Cookson as Willow Thane
- Merle Tottenham as Tessie
- Gordon McLeod as Superintendent Belstock
- Honor Boswell as Alpha
- Beryl Boswell as Omega

== Music ==
Formby's songs include: "She's Got Two Of Everything" (Cunningham/Towers), "I'd Like A Dream Like That" (Formby/Cliffe), and "The Daring Young Man" (Formby/Cliffe).

== Release ==
Because of a realistic murder scene, the film was granted a British 'A' certificate, ensuring no one under the age of 16 would be admitted to the cinema unless accompanied by an adult.

== Critical reception ==
The Monthly Film Bulletin wrote: "Nobody would attempt to pretend to believe the naive melodramatics which here pass as story background to Formby's fooling; but since they background Formby, that is probably unimportant. The slapstick aspects of the story are a little better because Formby is the centre of them – climbing in and out of illusionists' baskets, disguising himself in a beard, playing hide-and-seek in a service lift. In this and in the exploitation of his unique brand of charm Formby is in form. He also sings a naughty song or two."

Kine Weekly wrote: "The first half is definitely on the slow side, but from the moment George finds himself a murder suspect, and, with the help of his vaudeville pals, turns amateur sleuth, its pace appreciably quickens. The last lap, a showmanlike mixture of slapstick, vaudeville and melodrama, is a good thrill and fun. In spite of the tardy opening, if is first-rate popular entertainment and a welcome change from conventional Formby fare. It has also good star values."

The Daily Film Renter wrote: "Sturdy direction. Supporting cast is competent without being too obtrusive and it's Formby, Formby all the way, which is just how the fans like it."

Halliwell's Film Guide comments that it is "one of the star's last vehicles, not too bad at all, but without the sweet smell of success."

TV Guide gave the film two out of four stars, and noted, "Five screenwriters collaborated on the script, churning out a lively, witty programmer".
