= David Pirie =

British screenwriter, film producer and journalist

David Pirie is a British screenwriter, film producer, film critic, and novelist. As a screenwriter, he is known for his noirish original thrillers, classic adaptations and period gothic pieces. In 1998, he was nominated for a BAFTA for Best Drama Serial for his adaptation of Wilkie Collins's 1859 novel The Woman in White into "The Woman in White" (BBC, 1997). His first book, A Heritage of Horror: The English Gothic Cinema 1946–1972 (1973), was the first book-length survey of the British horror film. He has written several novels, including the Dark Beginnings of Sherlock Holmes trilogy which includes The Patient's Eyes (2002), The Night Calls (2003), and The Dark Water (2006).

== Screenwriting ==
Pirie's work for TV and film includes the New York TV Festival award-winning Rainy Day Women (1984), described by Mark Lawson in The Guardian as "one of the neglected masterpieces of British TV." His three-part Never Come Back (BBC, 1990) – an adaptation of an obscure wartime thriller of the same name by author John Mair – has been described as "the film noir atmosphere of 1940s cinema brought across to remarkable effect."

Pirie's Ashenden (1991), which was adapted from the stories by Somerset Maugham, was not well received in the UK but praised by US critics. His three-part drama Natural Lies first aired on the BBC in 1992. He courted controversy in 1995 with Black Easter, a near-future thriller for BBC2 examining an increasingly dystopian European Union fighting waves of immigration from a war on its borders: despite its popularity, it has never been repeated. He wrote Element of Doubt (1996) and worked (uncredited) on the screenplay for Lars von Trier's Oscar-nominated Breaking the Waves (1996).

In 1998, Pirie was nominated for a BAFTA for Best Drama Serial for his adaptation of Wilkie Collins's 1859 novel The Woman in White into "The Woman in White" (BBC, 1997). The two part film was described by The Observer as "simply the best TV drama has to offer." In 2018 he co-executive produced the BBC's five-part The Woman in White TV series of the same novel, starring Jessie Buckley.

Pirie took a new approach to Sherlock Holmes both in TV and later in novels with the 'Murder Rooms' cycle, of which Publishers Weekly wrote "This brilliant debut mystery from British screenwriter Pirie offers a novel twist on the Sherlock Holmes pastiche". It first saw life as a two episode pilot Murder Rooms (2000) which was partly based on Arthur Conan Doyle's early life. Variety wrote, "Writer David Pirie has crafted a clever blend of historical evidence and fiction in the grand manner of a traditional Holmes mystery." The show was the second highest rated of all dramas on BBC2 in its year, spawning the series of books and TV shows, most notably Murder Rooms: The Patient's Eyes (2001). Pirie was credited as associate producer.

Pirie's two-part The Wyvern Mystery (BBC, 2000) – an adaptation of Sheridan Le Fanu's gothic horror-piece of the same name – has been described as "a splendid small-screen tribute to the moody-gloomy Gainsborough melodramas of the 1940s." In 2003, his screenplay adaptation of Agatha Christie's Sad Cypress, aired on ITV as an episode of the Poirot series, starring David Suchet.

In 2009 his ITV series Murderland starring Robbie Coltrane achieved ratings that Digital Spy called "impressive" and The Guardian noted drew a 26% share and 6.3 million people for its opening episode, averaging 5.8 million throughout its run.

As of 2014, Pirie was working on a modern remake of Henry James's The Turn of the Screw, a feature version of his earliest TV production Rainy Day Women and a thriller set in the 60s Six Zero for Carnival Films the makers of Downton Abbey.

== Film critic, journalist and author ==
Before he became a screenwriter, Pirie worked as a film critic for such publications as Sight and Sound and Monthly Film Bulletin while for some years he was the Film Editor of the London listings magazine Time Out. He has also written for several newspapers including The Times, The Guardian and The Daily Telegraph.

His first book, A Heritage of Horror: The English Gothic Cinema 1946–1972 (1973), the first book-length survey of the British horror film, has according to Kim Newman in Sight and Sound "long been regarded as a trail-blazing classic" and is described by SFX as among the small category of essential books on horror cinema. In it he analyses the films of Hammer and Amicus, and other British horror phenomena, including the works of Michael Reeves and what Pirie referred to as Anglo-Amalgamated's "Sadean Trilogy", beginning with Horrors of the Black Museum in 1959. An updated version of Pirie's book, entitled A New Heritage of Horror: The English Gothic Cinema was published in 2008. Film-maker Martin Scorsese described it as "the best study of British horror movies and an important contribution to the study of British cinema as a whole". Pirie's other film related works include The Vampire Cinema (1975) and Anatomy of the Movies (1981, as editor).

He has written several novels, including Mystery Story (1980), and the Dark Beginnings of Sherlock Holmes trilogy which includes The Patient's Eyes (2002), The Night Calls (2003), and The Dark Water (2006). The New York Times wrote of the first: "It is the combination of style and scholarship ... that gives this atmospheric yarn the heightened thrill of intellectual challenge." Publishers Weekly described it as "a brilliant debut mystery ... and several passages are truly spine-chilling."

== Bibliography ==
- A Heritage of Horror: The English Gothic Cinema 1946–1972 (1975) Avon ISBN 978-0380000692
- The Vampire Cinema (1977) Hamlyn ISBN 978-0600391579
- Mystery Story (1980) Frederick Mueller ISBN 978-0584311037
- The Dark Beginnings of Sherlock Holmes trilogy:

- The Patient's Eyes (2001) Century ISBN 978-0712670890
- The Night Calls (2003) Century ISBN 978-0312291044
- The Dark Water (2004) Century ISBN 978-0712671484

- A New Heritage of Horror: The English Gothic Cinema (2007) I B Tauris & Co ISBN 978-1845114817
