= 1944 in British radio =

This is a list of events from British radio in 1944.

== Events ==
=== January ===
- No events.

=== February ===
- 27 February – BBC General Forces Programme replaces the Forces Programme to provide entertainment suitable for American forces in Britain as well as British military and civilian audiences, including a large number of American network and Canadian Broadcasting Corporation programmes. It is also broadcast on shortwave frequencies of the BBC Overseas Service.

=== March ===
- 6 March – The BBC transmits a ballad opera, The Man Who Went to War, concerning an African American soldier, written by Langston Hughes and D. G. Bridson and presented by Paul Robeson.
- 10 March? – Lifting of (partial) marriage bar on women working at the BBC.

=== April ===
- April – The American Broadcasting Station in Europe (ABSIE) is established, transmitting from Britain in English, German, French, Dutch, Danish, and Norwegian to resistance movements in mainland Europe.

=== May ===
- No events.

=== June ===
- June – Utility radio ("War-time Civilian Receiver"), produced by the radio industry under government direction, is available for sale.
- 5 June – One day before D-Day, the BBC transmits coded messages (including the second line of a poem by Paul Verlaine and Hubert Gregg's "I'm Going to Get Lit Up When the Lights Go Up in London") from Britain to underground resistance fighters in France warning that the invasion of mainland Europe is about to begin.
- 6 June – D-Day: The 08:00 BBC news bulletin announces that paratroops have landed in France (reporter Guy Byam is among them). 17 BBC reporters are embedded with the invasion forces. At 09:32 John Snagge begins reading announcements of the landings "on the northern coast of France", broadcasting over BBC transmitters to home and overseas audiences and introducing a message from General Eisenhower. At 13:00, the first eyewitness report, recorded on a bomber, is broadcast. The King speaks to the nation at 21:00. Reports of the landings are carried by around 725 of the 914 broadcasting stations in the United States.
- 7 June – BBC Allied Expeditionary Forces Programme begins broadcasting to troops of the Supreme Headquarters Allied Expeditionary Force on 14 metres (583 kHz) providing a programme dominated by cabaret and swing music.

=== July ===
- 28 July – Sir Henry Wood, aged 75, conducts his last Promenade Concert, evacuated to the Corn Exchange, Bedford, three weeks before his death.

=== August ===
- 28 August – The BBC begins broadcasting in Dutch to Indonesia and in French to southeast Asia.

=== September ===
- 17–26 September – Battle of Arnhem: BBC correspondents Guy Byam and Stanley Maxted report from the scene.
- 20 September – Yehudi Menuhin gives the first British performance of Béla Bartók's Violin Concerto from Bedford, in the opening concert of a tour with the B.B.C. Orchestra conducted by Sir Adrian Boult.

=== October ===
- No events.

=== November ===
- No events.

=== December ===
- 31 December – A live BBC broadcast of a service from St Paul's Cathedral, London, includes the background sound of a V-2 rocket.

== Debuts ==
- 4 January – Much-Binding-in-the-Marsh (BBC General Forces Programme) (1944–1954)
- 27 February – Variety Bandbox (BBC General Forces Programme) (1944–1952)
- 6 June – War Report (BBC Home Service)

== Continuing radio programmes ==
=== 1930s ===
- In Town Tonight (1933–1960)

=== 1940s ===
- Music While You Work (1940–1967)
- Sunday Half Hour (1940–2018)
- Desert Island Discs (1942–Present)

== Births ==
- 2 February – Andrew Davis, orchestral conductor (died 2024)
- 9 May – Tony Prince, "The Royal Ruler", born Thomas Whitehead, DJ
- 12 May – Brian Kay, bass singer and radio music presenter
- 5 June – Nigel Rees, radio broadcaster
- 28 October – Gerry Anderson, Northern Irish radio broadcaster (died 2014)
- November – Jim Eldridge, scriptwriter
- 25 December – Kenny Everett, born Maurice Cole, DJ (died 1995)

== Deaths ==
- 22 June – Kent Stevenson, war reporter (shot down while flying on an air raid)
- 19 August – Sir Henry Wood, orchestral conductor (born 1869)

== See also ==
- 1944 in British music
- 1944 in British television
- 1944 in the United Kingdom
- List of British films of 1944
