= 1944 in British music =

This is a summary of 1944 in music in the United Kingdom.

== Events ==
- 4 January – Benjamin Britten and Peter Pears begin a long association with Decca Records, recording four of Britten's folk song arrangements. Britten spends most of this year at the Old Mill in Snape, Suffolk, working on the opera Peter Grimes.
- March – Vera Lynn goes to Shamsheernugger airfield in British India to entertain the troops before the Battle of Kohima.
- 19 March – Michael Tippett's oratorio A Child of Our Time receives its first performances at London's Adelphi Theatre.
- 25 May – Benjamin Britten and Peter Pears record Britten's Serenade for Tenor, Horn and Strings for Decca, with Dennis Brain and the Boyd Neel Orchestra.
- 19 June – American bandleader Glenn Miller flies to London to set up his U.S. Army Air Forces orchestra for the European Theater of Operations.
- 28 July – Sir Henry Wood, aged 75, conducts his last Promenade Concert, evacuated to the Corn Exchange, Bedford. He dies three weeks later.
- 20 September – Yehudi Menuhin gives the first British performance of Béla Bartók's Violin Concerto in Bedford, in the opening concert of a tour with the B.B.C. Orchestra conducted by Sir Adrian Boult.
- 23 September – English-born composer and violist Rebecca Clarke, stranded in the United States by the war, marries James Friskin, composer, concert pianist and founding member of the Juilliard School faculty.
- 3 October – Glenn Miller plays his last airfield concert in a hangar for the U.S.A.A.F. at RAF Kings Cliffe in Northamptonshire.
- 15 December – Glenn Miller takes off from RAF Twinwood Farm in Bedfordshire; his plane is lost over the English Channel.
- Contralto Kathleen Ferrier makes the first of her recordings of the aria "What is Life?" (Che farò) from Gluck's Orfeo ed Euridice which will rival sales by more popular singers over the next few years.

== Popular music ==
- "One Love", music and words Jack Popplewell.

== Classical music: new works ==
- Arnold Bax – To Russia for baritone solo and chorus (Masefield)
- Gerald Finzi – Farewell to Arms
- Ernest John Moeran – Sinfonietta (dedicated to Arthur Bliss)
- Grace Williams – Sea Sketches
- William Wordsworth – Symphony No. 1 in F minor

== Film and Incidental music ==
- William Alwyn – The Way Ahead
- Jack Beaver, Roy Douglas & James Turner – Candlelight in Algeria
- Allan Gray – A Canterbury Tale
- Gordon Jacob – For Those in Peril
- William Walton – Henry V, directed by and starring Laurence Olivier

== Musical theatre ==
- 25 May – A Night In Venice (Johann Strauss II) London production opens at the Cambridge Theatre

== Musical films ==
- Champagne Charlie starring Tommy Trinder
- One Exciting Night directed by Walter Forde and starring Vera Lynn, Donald Stewart and Mary Clare.

== Births ==
- 3 January – David Atherton, conductor
- 5 January – Jo Ann Kelly, singer and guitarist (John Dummer Band) (died 1990)
- 9 January – Jimmy Page, rock musician and producer (Led Zeppelin)
- 19 January – Laurie London, English singer
- 27 January – Nick Mason, percussionist and composer (Pink Floyd)
- 28 January – John Tavener, composer (died 2013)
- 2 February – Andrew Davis, conductor
- 15 February – Mick Avory, drummer
- 1 March – Roger Daltrey, vocalist (The Who)
- 17 March – John Lill, pianist
- 23 March
  - Tony McPhee, blues rock guitarist and singer (The Groundhogs) (died 2023)
  - Michael Nyman, composer
- 6 April – Felicity Palmer, operatic mezzo-soprano
- 26 April – Richard Bradshaw, opera conductor (died 2007)
- 8 May
  - Gary Glitter, singer-songwriter
  - Bill Legend, drummer (T. Rex and Bill Legend's T. Rex)
- 10 May – Jackie Lomax, singer-songwriter and guitarist (The Undertakers) (died 2013)
- 12 May – Brian Kay, singer, conductor, and radio host (The King's Singers)
- 20 May – Joe Cocker, singer (died 2014)
- 17 June – Chris Spedding, singer-songwriter and guitarist
- 21 June – Ray Davies, singer-songwriter (The Kinks)
- 22 June – Peter Asher, singer and record producer (Peter & Gordon)
- 24 June
  - Jeff Beck, singer-songwriter and guitarist
  - John "Charlie" Whitney, English guitarist (Family, Axis Point, and Streetwalkers)
  - Chris Wood, English saxophonist (Traffic and Ginger Baker's Air Force) (d. 1983)
- 22 July – Rick Davies, keyboardist (Supertramp)
- 2 August – Jim Capaldi, musician and songwriter (died 2005)
- 5 August – Christopher Gunning, composer
- 16 August – Kevin Ayers, singer-songwriter (died 2013)
- 10 September – Thomas Allen, operatic baritone
- 9 October – John Entwistle, bassist (The Who) (died 2002)
- 2 November – Keith Emerson, keyboardist and composer (died 2016)
- 10 November – Tim Rice, lyricist

== Deaths ==
- 19 January – Harold Fraser-Simson, songwriter and composer of light music (born 1872)
- 6 February – Philip Michael Faraday, organist, composer and theatrical producer (born 1875)
- 12 February – Annie Fortescue Harrison, songwriter and composer of piano music (born 1850 or 1851)
- 29 February – Durward Lely, operatic tenor (born 1852)
- 9 May – Dame Ethel Smyth, composer (born 1858)
- 24 June – Chick Henderson, dance band singer (born 1912; killed in action)
- 4 July – Alice Burville, singer and actress (born 1856)
- 11 July – Frank Bury, composer (born 1910; killed in action)
- 13 July – Eda Kersey, violinist (born 1904; stomach cancer)
- 19 August – Sir Henry Wood, conductor (born 1869)
- 21 September – Louis N. Parker, dramatist, composer and translator (born 1852)

== See also ==
- 1944 in British television
- 1944 in the United Kingdom
- List of British films of 1944
