= List of Italian films of 1944 =

A list of films produced in Italy in 1944 (see 1944 in film). At the time the Italian Civil War was being fought as part of the wider Second World War and production of new films fell sharply from previous years.

Title	Director	Cast	Genre	Notes
1944
Aeroporto	Piero Costa			
L' Angelo del miracolo				
The Children Are Watching Us (I bambini ci guardano)	Vittorio De Sica	Luciano De Ambrosis, Isa Pola, Emilio Cigoli	Drama	Close to Italian neorealism; 1st collaboration De Sica - Cesare Zavattini
The Devil Goes to Boarding School	Jean Boyer	Lilia Silvi, Leonardo Cortese, Greta Gonda	Comedy	
Caposaldo				
The Innkeeper	Luigi Chiarini	Luisa Ferida, Armando Falconi	Historical comedy	
Mist on the Sea	Marcello Pagliero, Hans Hinrich	Viveca Lindfors, Gustav Diessl, Umberto Spadaro	Drama	
The Priest's Hat	Ferdinando Maria Poggioli	Roldano Lupi, Lída Baarová, Luigi Almirante	Drama	
Resurrection	Flavio Calzavara	Doris Duranti, Claudio Gora	Drama	
Sorelle Materassi	Ferdinando Maria Poggioli	Emma Gramatica, Irma Gramatica, Clara Calamai, Massimo Serato, Olga Solbelli	Drama	
Zazà	Renato Castellani	Isa Miranda, Antonio Centa	Drama	
