= 1944 in film =

The year 1944 in film involved some significant events, including the wholesome, award-winning Going My Way plus popular murder mysteries such as Double Indemnity, Gaslight and Laura.

== Events ==
- March 16 – MGM's supernatural romantic drama A Guy Named Joe, starring Spencer Tracy and Irene Dunne, opens in Los Angeles.
- May 3 – The musical comedy drama Going My Way, directed by Leo McCarey and starring Bing Crosby and Barry Fitzgerald, premieres in New York City. It opens in Los Angeles on August 16. The highest-grossing picture of the year, it goes on to win a total of seven Academy Awards, including Best Picture; Best Director for McCarey; Best Actor for Crosby; Best Supporting Actor for Fitzgerald (who, in an anomaly, was also nominated in lead, prompting a rule change); and Best Original Song for "Swinging on a Star".
- May 13 – Dale Evans appears in her first film with future husband, Roy Rogers – Cowboy and the Senorita.
- July 20 – Home front drama Since You Went Away is released in the United States.
- August 16–September 11 – Nazi propaganda documentary Theresienstadt is filmed in the Theresienstadt Ghetto. Following completion of filming, co-director Kurt Gerron and many of those featured are transported to Auschwitz concentration camp and murdered; although completed in 1945, the film is never released.
- September 6 – Crime thriller film noir Double Indemnity is released in the United States.
- September – Around 640 motion picture actors, writers and directors are included on the Gottbegnadeten list in Nazi Germany, protecting them from military conscription.
- November 22 – MGM's musical Meet Me in St. Louis, starring Judy Garland and Margaret O'Brien, premieres. Hugely popular with both audiences and critics, the film is nominated for four Academy Awards.

== Awards ==
Category/Organization	2nd Golden Globe Awards April 16, 1945	17th Academy Awards March 15, 1945
Best Film	Going My Way	
Best Director	Leo McCarey; Going My Way	
Best Actor	Alexander Knox; Wilson	Bing Crosby; Going My Way
Best Actress	Ingrid Bergman; Gaslight	
Best Supporting Actor	Barry Fitzgerald; Going My Way	
Best Supporting Actress	Agnes Moorehead; Mrs. Parkington	Ethel Barrymore; None but the Lonely Heart

== Top-grossing films (U.S.) ==
The top ten 1944 released films by box office gross in North America are as follows:

Highest-grossing films of 1944
Rank	Title	Distributor	Domestic rentals
1	Going My Way	Paramount	$6,500,000
2	Meet Me in St. Louis	MGM	$5,016,000
3	Since You Went Away	United Artists/Selznick International	$4,950,000
4	Thirty Seconds Over Tokyo	MGM	$4,297,000
5	The Story of Dr. Wassell	Paramount	$4,209,968
6	The White Cliffs of Dover	MGM	$4,045,000
7	A Guy Named Joe	MGM	$3,970,000
8	Hollywood Canteen	Warner Bros.	$3,831,000
9	To Have and Have Not	Warner Bros.	$3,652,000
10	Bathing Beauty	MGM	$3,284,000

== Top Ten Money Making Stars ==
Rank	Actor/Actress
1.	Bing Crosby
2.	Gary Cooper
3.	Bob Hope
4.	Betty Grable
5.	Spencer Tracy
6.	Greer Garson
7.	Humphrey Bogart
8.	Abbott and Costello
9.	Cary Grant
10.	Bette Davis

== Notable films ==
Films produced in the United States unless stated otherwise

=== A ===
- The Adventures of Mark Twain, starring Fredric March
- Ali Baba and the Forty Thieves, starring Maria Montez and Jon Hall
- And Now Tomorrow, starring Alan Ladd and Loretta Young
- And the Angels Sing, starring Fred MacMurray and Dorothy Lamour
- Army (陸軍, Rikugun), directed by Keisuke Kinoshita, starring Chishū Ryū and Kinuyo Tanaka – (Japan)
- Arsenic and Old Lace, directed by Frank Capra, starring Cary Grant, Priscilla Lane, Raymond Massey, Peter Lorre; filmed in 1941 but not released until 1944
- At Land, directed by Maya Deren

=== B ===
- Bathing Beauty, starring Esther Williams and Red Skelton
- Berlanti, directed by and starring Youssef Wahbi – (Egypt)
- Between Two Worlds, starring John Garfield, Eleanor Parker and Sydney Greenstreet
- The Black Pirate (El corsario negro), starring Pedro Armendariz – (Mexico)
- The Bridge of San Luis Rey, starring Lynn Bari
- Buffalo Bill, starring Joel McCrea and Maureen O'Hara
- A Bullet in the Heart (Rossassa Fel Qalb) – (Egypt)

=== C ===
- Candlelight in Algeria, starring James Mason – (GB)
- Can't Help Singing, starring Deanna Durbin
- A Canterbury Tale, written and directed by Michael Powell and Emeric Pressburger, starring Eric Portman – (GB)
- The Canterville Ghost, starring Charles Laughton, Robert Young and Margaret O'Brien
- Casanova Brown, starring Gary Cooper
- Champagne Charlie, directed by Alberto Cavalcanti, starring Tommy Trinder and Stanley Holloway – (GB)
- The Children Are Watching Us (I bambini ci guardano), directed by Vittorio De Sica – (Italy)
- Christmas Holiday, starring Gene Kelly
- The Climax, starring Susanna Foster and Boris Karloff
- Cobra Woman, starring Maria Montez
- The Conspirators, starring Paul Henreid and Hedy Lamarr
- Cover Girl, starring Rita Hayworth and Gene Kelly
- Cowboy and the Senorita, starring Roy Rogers and Dale Evans
- Crime by Night, starring Jane Wyman
- Cry of the Werewolf, starring Nina Foch
- The Curse of the Cat People, starring Simone Simon

=== D ===
- Days of Glory, starring Gregory Peck
- Don't Take It to Heart, directed by Jeffrey Dell, starring Richard Greene – (GB)
- Double Indemnity, directed by Billy Wilder, starring Fred MacMurray, Barbara Stanwyck and Edward G. Robinson
- Dragon Seed, starring Katharine Hepburn
- Dream of the Red Chamber (Hong lou meng) – (China)

=== E ===
- Enemy of Women, starring Paul Andor
- Experiment Perilous, starring Hedy Lamarr and George Brent

=== F ===
- Fanny by Gaslight, directed by Anthony Asquith, starring Phyllis Calvert, James Mason, Stewart Granger – (GB)
- Fiddlers Three, starring Tommy Trinder (GB)
- The Fighting Seabees, starring John Wayne and Susan Hayward
- The Fighting Sullivans, directed by Lloyd Bacon, starring Anne Baxter and Thomas Mitchell
- For Those in Peril, directed by Charles Crichton – (GB)
- Frenchman's Creek, starring Joan Fontaine and Basil Rathbone
- Die Feuerzangenbowle (The Punch Bowl) – (Germany)

=== G ===
- Gaslight, starring Ingrid Bergman, Charles Boyer and Joseph Cotten
- Going My Way, directed by Leo McCarey, starring Bing Crosby and Barry Fitzgerald – winner of 7 Oscars
- The Great Moment, starring Joel McCrea and Betty Field
- Greenwich Village, starring Carmen Miranda and Don Ameche
- The Great Sacrifice (Opfergang) – (Germany)

=== H ===
- Hail the Conquering Hero, written and directed by Preston Sturges, starring Eddie Bracken and Ella Raines
- The Halfway House, directed by Basil Dearden, starring Mervyn Johns and Glynis Johns
- The Heavenly Body, starring William Powell and Hedy Lamarr
- Henry V, directed by and starring Laurence Olivier – (GB)
- The Hitler Gang, starring Robert Watson
- Hollywood Canteen, starring Joan Leslie
- Home in Indiana, starring Walter Brennan
- The Hour Before the Dawn, starring Veronica Lake
- House of Frankenstein, starring Boris Karloff and Lon Chaney Jr.

=== I ===
- I'll Be Seeing You, starring Ginger Rogers and Shirley Temple
- In Our Time, starring Ida Lupino and Paul Henreid
- In Society, starring Bud Abbott and Lou Costello
- It Happened Tomorrow, starring Dick Powell

=== J ===
- Janie, directed by Michael Curtiz, starring Joyce Reynolds
- Jwar Bhata – (India)

=== K ===
- The Keys of the Kingdom, starring Gregory Peck, Cedric Hardwicke, Vincent Price and Roddy McDowall
- Knickerbocker Holiday, starring Nelson Eddy
- Kismet, starring Ronald Colman and Marlene Dietrich

=== L ===
- Lady in the Dark, starring Ginger Rogers and Ray Milland
- Lady, Let's Dance, ice skating musical starring Belita and comedy ice team Frick and Frack
- Lake Placid Serenade, starring Vera Ralston
- Laura, directed by Otto Preminger, starring Gene Tierney, Dana Andrews, Clifton Webb and Vincent Price
- Lifeboat, directed by Alfred Hitchcock, starring Tallulah Bankhead, John Hodiak, William Bendix, Walter Slezak, Henry Hull and Hume Cronyn
- The Lodger, starring Merle Oberon and George Sanders
- Lost in a Harem, starring Bud Abbott and Lou Costello
- Love Story, starring Margaret Lockwood and Stewart Granger – (GB)

=== M ===
- Man from Frisco directed by Robert Florey, starring Michael O'Shea and Anne Shirley
- María Candelaria, starring Dolores del Río and Pedro Armendáriz – (Mexico)
- Marie-Louise directed by Leopold Lindtberg and an uncredited Franz Schnyder
- The Mask of Dimitrios, starring Peter Lorre, Sydney Greenstreet and Zachary Scott
- Meet Me in St. Louis, directed by Vincente Minnelli, starring Judy Garland
- Meet the People, starring Lucille Ball
- Melody of Murder (Mordets Melodi) – (Denmark)
- Memphis Belle: A Story of a Flying Fortress, a documentary by William Wyler
- Ministry of Fear, starring Ray Milland
- The Miracle of Morgan's Creek, directed by Preston Sturges, starring Eddie Bracken and Betty Hutton
- Mr. Skeffington, starring Bette Davis and Claude Rains
- Mrs. Parkington, starring Greer Garson
- The Mummy's Curse, starring Lon Chaney Jr.
- The Mummy's Ghost, starring Lon Chaney Jr.
- Murder, My Sweet (aka Farewell My Lovely), directed by Edward Dmytryk, starring Dick Powell and Claire Trevor
- Music for Millions, starring Margaret O'Brien

=== N ===
- The Nail (El clavo) – (Spain)
- National Velvet, starring Elizabeth Taylor and Mickey Rooney
- None but the Lonely Heart, starring Cary Grant and Ethel Barrymore
- None Shall Escape, starring Alexander Knox

=== O ===
- On Approval, starring Clive Brook and Googie Withers – (GB)
- Once Upon a Time, starring Cary Grant, Ted Donaldson, Janet Blair
- Our Hearts Were Young and Gay, starring Gail Russell and Diana Lynn

=== P ===
- Pardon My Rhythm, starring Gloria Jean
- Passage to Marseille, starring Humphrey Bogart, Claude Rains, Peter Lorre and Sydney Greenstreet
- The Pearl of Death, a Sherlock Holmes mystery directed by Roy William Neill, starring Basil Rathbone as Holmes, and Nigel Bruce as Watson; co-starring Rondo Hatton and Evelyn Ankers
- Phantom Lady, starring Franchot Tone and Ella Raines
- Pin Up Girl, starring Betty Grable
- Port of Freedom (Große Freiheit Nr. 7) – (Germany)
- Possession (Besættelse) – (Denmark)
- The Princess and the Pirate, starring Bob Hope and Virginia Mayo
- The Purple Heart, starring Dana Andrews, Richard Conte and Farley Granger

=== R ===
- Rainbow (Raduga) – (U.S.S.R.)
- Rationing, starring Wallace Beery and Marjorie Main
- The Rats of Tobruk (aka The Fighting Rats of Tobruk), starring Peter Finch and Chips Rafferty – (Australia)
- The Respectable Ladies of Pardubice (Počestné paní pardubické), directed by Martin Frič – (Czechoslovakia)

=== S ===
- The Scarlet Claw, a Sherlock Holmes mystery directed by Roy William Neill, starring Basil Rathbone as Holmes, and Nigel Bruce as Watson
- The Seventh Cross, directed by Fred Zinnemann, starring Spencer Tracy
- Sherlock Holmes and The Spider Woman, a Sherlock Holmes mystery directed by Roy William Neill, starring Basil Rathbone as Holmes and Nigel Bruce as Watson; co-starring Gale Sondergaard
- Since You Went Away, starring Claudette Colbert, Jennifer Jones and Shirley Temple
- Something for the Boys starring Carmen Miranda, Michael O'Shea and Vivian Blaine
- Song of Russia, starring Robert Taylor
- The Soul of a Monster, starring George Macready
- Storm Over Lisbon, starring Vera Ralston
- The Story of Dr. Wassell, starring Gary Cooper
- Sunday Dinner for a Soldier, starring Anne Baxter and John Hodiak
- The Suspect, starring Charles Laughton

=== T ===
- Tall in the Saddle, starring John Wayne
- Thirty Seconds over Tokyo, starring Spencer Tracy and Van Johnson
- This Happy Breed, directed by David Lean, starring John Mills and Celia Johnson – (GB)
- The Three Caballeros, a Walt Disney animated film starring Donald Duck and Dora Luz (released in South America in 1944, but was released in 1945 in the U.S.)
- Time Flies, starring Tommy Handley (GB)
- To Have And Have Not, directed by Howard Hawks, starring Humphrey Bogart and Lauren Bacall
- Torment (Hets), directed by Alf Sjoberg – (Sweden)
- The Tower of the Seven Hunchbacks (La Torre de los Siete Jorobados) – (Spain)
- Tunisian Victory, directed by Frank Capra, Hugh Stewart and John Huston – (US/GB)
- Two Thousand Women, starring Flora Robson and Phyllis Calvert – (GB)

=== U ===
- The Uninvited, starring Ray Milland
- Up in Arms, starring Danny Kaye and Dinah Shore

=== W ===
- The Way Ahead (Immortal Battalion), directed by Carol Reed, starring David Niven and Stanley Holloway – (GB)
- Weird Woman, starring Lon Chaney Jr. and Anne Gwynne
- When Strangers Marry, starring Dean Jagger, Kim Hunter, Robert Mitchum
- The White Cliffs of Dover, starring Irene Dunne
- Wilson, a biopic of President Woodrow Wilson, starring Alexander Knox and Charles Coburn
- Wing and a Prayer, directed by Henry Hathaway, starring Dana Andrews and Don Ameche
- The Woman in the Window, directed by Fritz Lang, starring Edward G. Robinson and Joan Bennett

=== Y ===
- The Yellow Rose of Texas, starring Roy Rogers and Dale Evans

== 1944 film releases ==
=== January–March ===
- January 1944
  - 7 January
    - Standing Room Only
  - 11 January
    - Career Girl
  - 14 January
    - Ali Baba and the Forty Thieves
  - 28 January
    - Lifeboat
    - Phantom Lady
- February 1944
  - 3 February
    - None Shall Escape
    - The Fighting Sullivans
  - 5 February
    - Captain America
  - 10 February
    - Lady in the Dark
  - 11 February
    - The Bridge of San Luis Rey
  - 22 February
    - Snow White and the Seven Dwarfs (re-issue)
- March 1944
  - 2 March
    - The Curse of the Cat People
  - 16 March
    - A Guy Named Joe
  - 17 March
    - Knickerbocker Holiday
  - 22 March
    - Cover Girl
  - 23 March
    - The Heavenly Body

=== April–June ===
- April 1944
  - 9 April
    - Rosie the Riveter (film)
  - 17 April
    - The Lady and the Monster
  - 25 April
    - Pin Up Girl
    - And the Angels Sing
  - 26 April
    - The Hitler Gang
    - The Story of Dr. Wassell
- May 1944
  - 5 May
    - Follow the Boys
  - 8 May
    - Time Flies – (Great Britain)
  - 11 May
    - The White Cliffs of Dover
  - 13 May
    - Cowboy and the Senorita
  - 27 May
    - The Tiger Woman
- June 1944
  - 1 June
    - Address Unknown
  - 8 June
    - Days of Glory
  - 27 June
    - Bathing Beauty

=== July–September ===
- July 1944
  - 2 July
    - The Hairy Ape
  - 6 July
    - Double Indemnity
  - 7 July
    - The Mummy's Ghost
  - 8 July
    - Johnny Doesn't Live Here Any More
  - 12 July
    - The Invisible Man's Revenge
  - 14 July
    - Summer Storm
  - 20 July
    - Since You Went Away
  - 22 July
    - The Adventures of Mark Twain
  - 24 July
    - The Seventh Cross
- August 1944
  - 1 August
    - Wilson
  - 12 August
    - Mr. Skeffington
  - 16 August
    - Going My Way
  - 17 August
    - Cry of the Werewolf
    - The Soul of a Monster
  - 23 August
    - Marriage Is a Private Affair
  - 30 August
    - Till We Meet Again
- September 1944
  - 2 September
    - Our Hearts Were Young and Gay
  - 9 September
    - Crime by Night
  - 12 September
    - Strangers in the Night
  - 23 September
    - Arsenic and Old Lace

=== October–December ===
- October 1944
  - 11 October
    - To Have and Have Not
  - 17 October
    - Fiddlers Three – (GB)
    - None but the Lonely Heart
- November 1944
  - 1 November
    - Something for the Boys
  - 3 November
    - The Woman in the Window
  - 10 November
    - Enemy of Women
  - 11 November
    - Bluebeard
  - 15 November
    - Thirty Seconds Over Tokyo
  - 28 November
    - Meet Me in St. Louis
- December 1944
  - 1 December
    - House of Frankenstein
  - 5 December
    - Blonde Fever
  - 6 December
    - Nothing but Trouble
  - 15 December
    - Hollywood Canteen
  - 18 December
    - Dangerous Passage
  - 22 December
    - Winged Victory
    - The Mummy's Curse
  - 23 December
    - Lake Placid Serenade
  - 24 December
    - I'll Be Seeing You
  - 29 December
    - Tomorrow, the World!

== Serials ==
- Black Arrow
- Captain America, starring Dick Purcell
- The Desert Hawk, starring Gilbert Roland and Charles Middleton
- The Great Alaskan Mystery
- Haunted Harbor, starring Kane Richmond
- Mystery of the River Boat
- Raiders of Ghost City
- The Tiger Woman, starring Linda Stirling
- Zorro's Black Whip, starring Linda Stirling

== Short film series ==
- Our Gang (1922-1944)
- The Three Stooges (1934–1959)

== Animated short film series ==
- Mickey Mouse (1928–1953)
- Looney Tunes (1930–1969)
- Terrytoons (1930–1964)
- Merrie Melodies (1931–1969)
- Popeye (1933–1957)
- Color Rhapsodies (1934–1949)
- Donald Duck (1934–1956)
- Porky Pig (1935–1965)
- Daffy Duck (1937–1968)
- Goofy (1939–1955)
- Andy Panda (1939–1949)
- Tom and Jerry (1940–1958)
- Bugs Bunny (1940–1964)
- Woody Woodpecker (1941–1949)
- Swing Symphonies (1941–1945)
- The Fox and the Crow (1941–1950)
- Red Hot Riding Hood (1943–1949)
- Droopy (1943–1958)
- Screwball Squirrel (1944–1946)
- Sylvester the Cat (1944–1966)

== Births ==
- January 5 – Franco Ferrini, Italian screenwriter
- January 9 – Harun Farocki, German filmmaker (died 2014)
- January 10 – William Sanderson, American actor
- January 13 – Mike Edmonds, English actor
- January 19 – Shelley Fabares, American actress (died 2026)
- January 20 – Margaret Avery, American actress
- January 22 – Pamela Salem, British actress (died 2024)
- January 23 – Rutger Hauer, Dutch actor (died 2019)
- January 25 – Zully Montero, Cuban actress
- January 28 – Andrew Jack, British dialect coach and actor (died 2020)
- February 1 – Leo Burmester, American actor (died 2007)
- February 3 – Trisha Noble, Australian singer and actress (died 2021)
- February 8
  - Richard Durden, English actor
  - Roger Lloyd-Pack, English actor (died 2014)
  - Michael P. Moran, American actor (died 2004)
- February 13
  - Yves Afonso, French actor (died 2018)
  - Stockard Channing, American actress
  - Michael Ensign, American actor
- February 14 – Alan Parker, English director, producer and screenwriter (died 2020)
- February 22 – Jonathan Demme, American director, producer and screenwriter (died 2017)
- February 29 – Dennis Farina, American actor (died 2013)
- March 5 – Peter Weibel, Ukrainian-born Austrian experimental filmmaker
- March 6 – Harold Hopkins, Australian actor (died 2011)
- March 10 – Richard Gant, American actor
- March 14 – Steve Daskewisz, American actor and stunt double (died 2018)
- March 19 – Guy Thauvette, Canadian actor
- March 24 – R. Lee Ermey, American film, television and voice actor (died 2018)
- March 26 – Diana Ross, American singer and actress
- March 28 – Ken Howard, American actor (died 2016)
- April 4 – Craig T. Nelson, American actor
- April 5 – Willeke van Ammelrooy, Dutch actress
- April 6 – Anita Pallenberg, Italian-born actress and model (died 2017)
- April 8 – Joey D. Vieira, American actor (died 2025)
- April 13 – Charles Burnett, American director
- April 30 – Jill Clayburgh, American actress (died 2010)
- May 4 – Russi Taylor, American voice actress (died 2019)
- May 5
  - Roger Rees, Welsh actor and director (died 2015)
  - John Rhys-Davies, English actor
- May 7
  - Richard O'Sullivan, British actor (died 2026)
- May 8 - Carole Skinner, Australian retired actress
- May 10 – Jim Abrahams, American director, producer and screenwriter (died 2024)
- May 14 – George Lucas, American director, producer and screenwriter
- May 16 – Danny Trejo, American actor and voice actor
- May 19
  - Peter Mayhew, English actor (died 2019)
  - Frank Pellegrino, American actor (died 2017)
- May 25 – Frank Oz, American actor, filmmaker and puppeteer
- May 26
  - Olga Bisera, Yugoslav-born Italian actress and producer
  - Andre Stojka, American voice actor and singer
- May 28
  - Sondra Locke, American actress (died 2018)
  - Clement von Franckenstein, English actor (died 2019)
- May 29 – Helmut Berger, Austrian actor (died 2023)
- June 5 – Colm Wilkinson, Irish singer and actor
- June 11 – Roscoe Orman, American actor
- June 12 – Terence Kelly, Canadian actor
- June 14 – Joe Grifasi, American character actor
- June 20 – Oliver Cotton, English actor, comedian and playwright
- June 21 – Tony Scott, British director and producer (died 2012)
- June 23 – Ingrīda Andriņa, Latvian actress (died 2015)
- June 24 – Julian Holloway, British actor (died 2025)
- June 27 – Paul Koslo, German-Canadian actor (died 2019)
- June 29 – Gary Busey, American actor
- July 1 – Wahid Hamed, Egyptian screenwriter (died 2021)
- July 2 – Viiu Härm, Estonian actress
- July 4 – Emilio Echevarria, Mexican actor (died 2025)
- July 8 – Jeffrey Tambor, American actor
- July 12 – Delia Ephron, American writer and producer
- July 17 – Catherine Schell, Hungarian-born British actress
- July 18 – Sverre Anker Ousdal, Norwegian actor (died 2026)
- July 22
  - Nick Brimble, English actor
  - Peter Jason, American character actor (died 2025)
- July 23 – Pepe Serna, American actor
- July 30
  - Frances de la Tour, English actress
  - Yoon Jeong-hee, South Korean actress
- July 31 – Geraldine Chaplin, American actress
- August 4 – Richard Belzer, American actor and stand-up comedian (died 2023)
- August 7
  - John Glover, American actor
  - David Rasche, American actor
- August 9 – Sam Elliott, American actor
- August 11 – Ian McDiarmid, Scottish actor
- August 13
  - Kevin Tighe, American actor
  - Dan Ziskie, American actor (died 2025)
- August 19 – John Roselius, American actor (died 2018)
- August 21 – Peter Weir, Australian director, producer and screenwriter
- August 25 – Anthony Heald, American character actor
- August 26 – Stephen Greif, English actor (died 2022)
- August 27 – G. W. Bailey, American actor
- August 30 – Wolf Roth, German actor
- September 1 – Beau Starr, American actor (died 2026)
- September 6 – Swoosie Kurtz, American actress
- September 13 – Jacqueline Bisset, English actress
- September 15 – Pik-Sen Lim, Malaysian-British actress (died 2025)
- September 16 – Michael Edwards, American actor
- September 20 – Jeremy Child, British actor (died 2022)
- September 21 – Fannie Flagg, American actress and comedian
- September 22
  - Kathe Green, American actress, model and singer
  - Frazer Hines, English actor
- September 24 – Sven-Ole Thorsen, Danish retired actor, stuntman, bodybuilder and strongman competitor
- September 25 – Michael Douglas, American actor and producer
- September 26 – Helmut Bakaitis, German-born Australian director, actor and screenwriter
- September 28 – Matthew Cowles, American actor (died 2014)
- September 30 – Jarlath Conroy, Irish actor
- October 1 – Jean-Pierre Castaldi, French actor
- October 8 – Dale Dye, American actor, technical advisor, radio personality and writer
- October 10 – Lii Tedre, Estonian actress
- October 14 – Udo Kier, German actor (died 2025)
- October 20 – Robert Swan, American actor (died 2023)
- October 28 – Dennis Franz, American actor
- November 2 – Patrice Chéreau, French filmmaker, actor and producer (died 2013)
- November 4 – Linda Gary, American actress, voice actress (died 1995)
- November 14 – Keith Drinkel, English actor
- November 17
  - Danny DeVito, American actor, comedian, producer and director
  - Gary Goldman, American animator, producer and director
  - Lorne Michaels, Canadian-American producer
- November 18 – Arthur J. Nascarella, American actor
- November 21 – Harold Ramis, American actor, director and screenwriter (died 2014)
- November 22 – Paul Brooke, retired English actor
- November 24 – Peter Maloney, American actor and director
- November 25
  - Paul Copley, English character actor
  - Will McMillan, American actor, producer and director (died 2015)
  - Ben Stein, American actor and comedian
- November 27 - Gregory Hoblit, American director and producer
- December 4 – Carol Sutton, American actress (died 2020)
- December 5 – Jeroen Krabbe, Dutch actor and director
- December 8 – Sharmila Tagore, Indian actress
- December 11 – Teri Garr, American actress (died 2024)
- December 12 – Kenneth Cranham, Scottish actor
- December 15 – Morgan Paull, American actor (died 2012)
- December 17 – Bernard Hill, English actor (died 2024)
- December 18 - Beau Billingslea, American actor
- December 31
  - Gary Epper, American stuntman and actor (died 2007)
  - Taylor Hackford, American director

== Deaths ==
- January 3 – Aage Hertel, Danish actor (born 1873)
- March 14 – Merta Sterling, American actress (born 1883)
- April 10 – Pat West, American actor (born 1888)
- July 14 – Emil Fjellström, Swedish actor (born 1884)
- July 18 – Alan Dinehart, American actor (born 1889)
- July 20 – Mildred Harris, American actress (born 1901)
- September 24 – Hugo Thimig, Austrian actor (born 1854)
- October 28 – Kurt Gerron, German film director (born 1897)
- November 27 – Jill Furse, British actress (born 1915)
- December 9 – Laird Cregar, American actor (born 1913)
- December 13 – Lupe Vélez, Mexican actress (born 1908)
- December 15 – Glenn Miller, American bandleader, actor (born 1904)

== Film debuts ==
- Forrest J Ackerman – Hey, Rookie
- Michael Ansara – Action in Arabia
- Lauren Bacall – To Have and Have Not
- Ann Blyth – Chip Off the Old Block
- Steve Brodie – Ladies Courageous
- Red Buttons – Winged Victory
- Rory Calhoun – Something for the Boys
- Petula Clark – Medal for the General
- Peggy Ann Clifford – One Exciting Night
- Hazel Court – Champagne Charlie
- John Crawford – Thoroughbreds
- Margia Dean – Casanova in Burlesque
- Guy Deghy – Mr. Emmanuel
- John Derek – Since You Went Away
- Richard Erdman – Mr. Skeffington
- Mona Freeman – Double Indemnity
- Gloria Grahame – Blonde Fever
- Skip Homeier – Tomorrow, the World!
- Victoria Horne – Phantom Lady
- Trevor Howard – The Way Ahead
- James Robertson Justice – For Those in Peril
- Kay Kendall – Champagne Charlie
- Hardy Krüger – Junge Adler
- Angela Lansbury – Gaslight
- Guy Madison – Since You Went Away
- Kevin McCarthy – Winged Victory
- Lilia Michel – Naná
- Anthony Newley – Henry V
- Jane Nigh – Laura
- Janis Paige – Bathing Beauty
- Gregory Peck – Days of Glory
- Tatyana Pelttser – The Wedding
- Hella Petri – Phantom Lady
- Alan Reed – Days of Glory
- Marshall Reed – Law Men
- Enriqueta Reza – La vida inútil de Pito Pérez
- Zachary Scott – The Mask of Dimitrios
- Jean Simmons – Give Us the Moon
- Marshall Thompson – Henry Aldrich, Boy Scout

== Bibliography ==
- Birchard, Robert S. (2004). Cecil B. DeMille's Hollywood. University Press of Kentucky. ISBN 978-0813123240.
