= 1904 in British music =

This is a summary of 1904 in music in the United Kingdom.

== Events ==
- 7 January - The first performance of the Nonet for Four Voices, Four Strings and Pianoforte by Henry Walford Davies, with the composer at the piano, takes place at the St James's Hall in London.
- 14 March - The opening of a three-day Elgar Festival at Covent Garden - the first time such as event has been put on for a living English composer - which concludes on 16 March with the first performance of the orchestral work In the South.
- 20 May - Frank Bridge conducts the first performance of his symphonic poem, Mid of the Night at the St James’ Hall in London.
- 9 June - The London Symphony Orchestra puts on its inaugural concert under the direction of Hans Richter at the Queen’s Hall. The program includes music by Wagner, Bach, Mozart, Elgar and Liszt, concluding with Beethoven’s Fifth Symphony.
- 5 July - Edward Elgar is knighted at the King’s investiture.
- 15 July – Soprano Agnes Nicholls marries conductor Hamilton Harty.
- 20 August – The UK premiere of Claude Debussy‘s Prélude à l'après-midi d'un faune takes place at the Proms in the Queen’s Hall, nearly ten years after its premiere in Paris. Debussy’s music was not well known in the UK until the late Edwardian period.
- 7 September – The Love that Casteth Out Fear, a “sinfonia sacra” for contralto, bass, semi-chorus and orchestra by Sir Hubert Parry, is performed for the first time in Gloucester.
- 21 September – The first performance of Edward German's Welsh Rhapsody, conducted by the composer, takes place at the Cardiff Music Festival.
- 6 October – Everyman, a choral cantata by Sir Henry Walford Davies, is premiered at the Leeds Festival, conducted by Charles Stanford.
  - Other premieres at the Leeds Festival in October include Queen Mab, a poem for chorus and orchestra by Joseph Holbrooke, Five Songs of the Sea by Stanford. The Witches Daughter by Alexander Mackenzie and A Ballad of Dundee by Charles Wood.
- 26 November – The first performance of Joseph Holbrooke’s orchestral tone poem Ulalume is conducted by the composer at the Queen’s Hall.
- date unknown
  - Albert Coates makes his début as conductor of the Leipzig opera with Offenbach's The Tales of Hoffmann.
  - Cecil Sharp produces the first volume of his Folk Songs from Somerset.

== Popular music ==
- "Fu' The Noo", with words by. Harry Lauder & Gerald Grafton and music by Harry Lauder

== Classical music: new works ==
- Edward Elgar – Canto Popolare
- Hamilton Harty – An Irish Symphony
- Joseph Holbrooke – Horn Trio
- Herbert Hughes – Songs of Uladh
- Cyril Scott – Rhapsody for orchestra No. 1
- Ralph Vaughan Williams – In the Fen Country

== Opera ==
- Frederick Delius – Koanga (premièred 30 March in Germany)

== Musical theatre ==
- 5 March – The Cingalee, by Lionel Monckton, Adrian Ross and Percy Greenbank, opens at Daly's Theatre; it runs for 365 performances.
- 9 September – The Catch of the Season by Seymour Hicks and Cosmo Hamilton, with music by Herbert Haines and Evelyn Baker and lyrics by Charles H. Taylor, opens at the Vaudeville Theatre; it runs for 621 performances.

== Births ==
- 13 January – Richard Addinsell, composer (died 1977)
- 29 February – H. Hugh Bancroft, organist, choirmaster and composer (died 1988)
- 15 or 16 May – Eda Kersey, violinist (died 1944)
- 26 May – George Formby, music hall performer, singer, actor and songwriter (died 1961)
- 10 August – Herbert Kennedy Andrews, organist and composer (died 1965)
- 23 August – William Primrose, violist (died 1982)
- 17 September – Sir Frederick Ashton, dancer and choreographer (died 1988)
- 20 October – Anna Neagle, actress and singer (died 1986)
- 29 October – Vivian Ellis, composer (died 1996)
- 30 November – Bretton Byrd, film composer (died 1959)
- 9 December – Elsie Randolph, actress, dancer and singer (died 1982)

== Deaths ==
- 20 March – Louisa Pyne, operatic soprano and opera company manager, 75
- 29 April – Nellie Farren, burlesque actress and singer, 56 (heart failure)
- 30 May – Laura Joyce Bell, contralto singer and actress, 50
- 20 July – Arthur Lloyd, singer, songwriter, comedian and impresario, 65
- 31 October – Dan Leno, English music hall comedian, clog dancer and singer, 43

== See also ==
- 1904 in the United Kingdom
