= Massimo De Ambrosis =

Italian actor (born 1964)

- Born: 14 July 1964 (age 61); Rome, Italy
- Occupations: Actor; voice actor; dialogue adapter; dubbing director
- Years active: 1974–present
- Spouse: Elena Masini
- Children: 2
- Father: Luciano De Ambrosis

Massimo De Ambrosis (born 14 July 1964) is an Italian actor and voice actor.

== Biography ==
Born in Rome and the son of actor Luciano De Ambrosis, his career started in 1974. He performed onstage with Gigi Proietti, Johnny Dorelli and Néstor Garay and appeared in TV shows made for the Italian television. Massimo De Ambrosis is generally known to the Italian public as a voice actor. He has dubbed Edward Norton, Matthew Perry and Steve Carell in Italian. He has also dubbed the voices of Owen Wilson, Josh Lucas, Ben Stiller, Jason Statham and many more.

Among the dubbing roles De Ambrosis is known for is Chandler Bing from Friends as well as Maurice Boscorelli from Third Watch. After the sudden death of his colleague Vittorio De Angelis in 2015, De Ambrosis took over his ongoing dubbing contributions. De Ambrosis' animated dubbing roles include Calculon in Futurama.

=== Personal life ===
De Ambrosis is married to dubbing assistant Elena Masini and they have two children, Daniele and Luca, who also follow a dubbing career.

== Filmography ==
- Inverno al mare - TV miniseries (1982)
- La notte della repubblica - TV program (1990)
- Fantastico - variety show (1991)
- Casa dolce casa - sit-com (1993)
- Casa Vianello - sit-com, 1 episode (1993)

== Voice work ==
- Narrator in Passaggio a Nordovest - documentary series (1997), Mussolini, il cadavere vivente - documentary film (2012), Black Samurai - documentary (2020), Cronache di Donne Leggendarie. Hatshepsut e Nefertiti: l'Egitto delle Regine - documentary (2022)
- Marquis of Montescuro in Leo Da Vinci: Mission Mona Lisa - animated film (2017)

=== Dubbing roles ===
==== Animation ====
- Ranger in The Animals of Farthing Wood
- Vegeta in Dragon Ball (1st Italian dub)
- Calculon and various characters in Futurama
- Terrance in South Park (2000–2003), South Park: Bigger, Longer & Uncut
- Tag Tuckerbag, Anger Watkins (season 28), Warburton Parker and Ned Flanders Sr. in The Simpsons
- Mayor Shelbourne in Cloudy with a Chance of Meatballs
- Kronk Pepikrankenitz in Kronk's New Groove
- Spike Spiegel in Cowboy Bebop: The Movie
- François in Ratatouille
- Fred Jones in Scooby-Doo and the Alien Invaders
- Coach Skip in Fantastic Mr. Fox

==== Live action ====
- Chandler Bing in Friends
- Maurice Boscorelli in Third Watch
- The Narrator in Fight Club
- Evan Baxter in Bruce Almighty, Evan Almighty
- Adult Mike O'Donnell in 17 Again
- Frank Ginsberg in Little Miss Sunshine
- Ken Hutch in Starsky & Hutch
- Peter Bretter in Forgetting Sarah Marshall
- Gary in The Muppets
- Ned Plimpton in The Life Aquatic with Steve Zissou
- Nicholas "Oz" Oseransky in The Whole Nine Yards, The Whole Ten Yards
- Walter Fane in The Painted Veil
- Eisenheim in The Illusionist
- Wilbur Wright in Around the World in 80 Days
- Marcus Higgins in Grown Ups, Grown Ups 2
- Hefty Smurf in The Smurfs, The Smurfs 2
