= 1944 in British television =

This is a list of British television-related events from 1944.

== Events ==
British television did not broadcast in 1944. Television had been suspended since 1939 for the duration of the Second World War, due to fears that the signals would help German bombers. Television broadcasting resumed in 1946.

== Births ==
- 28 January – Bobby Ball (Harper), half of comedy double act Cannon and Ball (died 2020)
- 2 February – Geoffrey Hughes, English actor (died 2012)
- 8 February – Roger Lloyd-Pack, English actor (died 2014)
- 13 February – Jerry Springer, English-born television host (died 2023)
- 17 February – Nick Hewer, public relations consultant and television personality
- 11 March – Don Maclean, British comedian
- 8 April – Hywel Bennett, Welsh actor (died 2017)
- 25 April – Len Goodman, ballroom dancer and television personality (died 2023)
- 27 April – Michael Fish, British television weatherman
- 29 April – Michael Angelis, actor and narrator (died 2020)
- 5 May – John Rhys-Davies, Welsh actor
- 7 May – Richard O'Sullivan, actor
- 12 May – Sara Kestelman, British actor
- 31 May – Samantha Juste, Top of the Pops hostess (died 2014)
- 1 June – Robert Powell, actor
- 11 June – Vince Earl, singer, comedian and actor
- 20 July – Elizabeth Bennett, actress
- 27 July – Tony Capstick, English comedian, actor and musician (died 2003)
- 31 July – Jonathan Dimbleby, broadcaster and television presenter
- 9 August – John Simpson, BBC foreign correspondent and world affairs editor
- 11 August – Ian McDiarmid, Scottish actor
- 13 September
  - Carol Barnes, journalist (died 2008)
  - Jacqueline Bisset, English actress
- 22 September – Frazer Hines, British actor
- 26 September – Anne Robinson, British television host
- 12 October – Angela Rippon, journalist and newsreader
- 20 October – Clive Hornby, actor (died 2008)
- 28 October – Ian Marter, British actor (died 1986)
- 17 December – Bernard Hill, English actor (died 2024)
- 24 December – Barry Chuckle (Elliott), half of children's entertainment comedy double act the Chuckle Brothers (died 2018)
- 25 December – Kenny Everett, English radio DJ and comedian (died 1995)

== See also ==
- 1944 in British music
- 1944 in the United Kingdom
- List of British films of 1944
