= 1912 in British music =

This is a summary of 1912 in music in the United Kingdom.

== Events ==
- date unknown
  - The Birmingham Triennial Music Festival is held for the last time, and runs at a loss.
  - Edward German declines Sir Herbert Beerbohm Tree's proposal that he provide the music for a production based on the life of Sir Francis Drake, saying that its setting necessitate covering ground already explored in his 1902 opera Merrie England. He writes little original music after this time.
  - The Royal Academy of Music moves from Mayfair to purpose-built premises in Marylebone.

== Popular music ==
- Jack Judge & Harry H. Williams – "It's A Long Way To Tipperary"

== Recordings ==
- Harry Lauder – Roamin' in the Gloamin' (Victor Talking Machine Company)

== Classical music ==
- Kenneth J. Alford – Holyrood and The Vedette, marches
- Granville Bantock – In the Far West, serenade for string orchestra
- Arthur Bliss – F. 139, Intermezzo
- Frank Bridge
  - Piano Quintet
  - The Sea, orchestral suite
- George Butterworth – Bredon Hill and Other Songs
- Edward Elgar – The Music Makers
- Eugene Goossens – Variations on a Chinese Theme
- John Ireland – Songs of a Wayfarer
- Charles Villiers Stanford – Sonata for clarinet (or viola) and piano, Op. 129

== Opera ==
- Joseph Holbrooke – The Children of Don, Op. 56

== Musical theatre ==
- 24 February – The Sunshine Girl, with music by Paul Rubens, opens at the Gaiety Theatre, London, for a run of 336 performances.

== Births ==
- 27 March – Robert Hughes, composer (died 2007)
- 22 April – Kathleen Ferrier, contralto (died 1953)
- 18 June – Melville Cook, organist, conductor, composer and teacher (died 1993)
- 30 June – Polly Ward, singer and actress (died 1987)
- 22 November – Chick Henderson, singer (died 1944)
- 7 December – Daniel Jones, composer (died 1993)
- 30 December (in Canada) – Rosina Lawrence, actress, singer and dancer (died 1997)
- date unknown – Tommy Potts, fiddle player and composer (died 1988)

== Deaths ==
- 30 January – Florence St. John, singer and actress, 56
- 1 March – George Grossmith, comic singer in operetta, 64
- 15 April (drowned in the sinking of RMS Titanic):
  - Wallace Hartley, ship's bandleader and violinist, 33
  - John Law Hume, violinist, 21
- 14 August – Marion Hood, singer, 58
- 1 September – Samuel Coleridge-Taylor, composer, 37 (pneumonia)
- 1 October – Frances Allitsen, composer, 63
- 19 October – Richard Temple, opera singer, 66

== See also ==
- 1912 in the United Kingdom
