= The Haunted Strangler =

1958 British film by Robert Day

- Theatrical release poster
- Directed by: Robert Day
- Written by: John Croydon (as "John C. Cooper"); Jan Read
- Based on: an original story by Jan Read
- Produced by: John Croydon executive Richard Gordon
- Starring: Boris Karloff; Jean Kent; Elizabeth Allan; Anthony Dawson
- Cinematography: Lionel Banes
- Edited by: Peter Mayhew
- Music by: Buxton Orr
- Production company: Amalgamated Productions
- Distributed by: Metro-Goldwyn-Mayer (U.S.); Eros Films (U.K.)
- Release dates: 11 May 1958 (United States); 11 October 1958 (United Kingdom)
- Running time: 80 minutes
- Country: United Kingdom
- Language: English
- Budget: £80,000
- Box office: $650,000 (on double bill)

The Haunted Strangler (also known as Grip of the Strangler and originally titled The Judas Hole) is a 1958 British horror film directed by Robert Day and starring Boris Karloff, Jean Kent, Elizabeth Allan, and Anthony Dawson.

It was adapted from "Stranglehold", a story which screenwriter Jan Read had written specially for Karloff, and was shot back to back with producer Richard Gordon's Fiend Without a Face (1958), with both later being released as a double feature by MGM.

== Plot ==
In 1860, Edward Styles is accused of being the notorious Haymarket Strangler, who brutally killed five women by partially strangling them with one hand before stabbing them to death. Styles, who lacks the use of one arm, is tried and executed for these crimes. As his coffin is nailed shut, an unknown onlooker slips a knife into it.

Twenty years later, James Rankin, a novelist and social reformer, launches a private investigation to prove that Styles was innocent and would not have been convicted if adequate legal representation had been provided for him at trial. Police official Burk permits Rankin to examine the case evidence. Of note, the Strangler murdered his fifth victim, a dancer named Martha Stuart, at the sleazy Judas Hole music hall, where singer Cora Seth and other witnesses noticed his disabled left arm as he fled the scene; the Strangler's knife was never recovered; and a doctor named Tennant conducted the autopsies on all five Strangler victims as well as Styles, and then fell ill during Styles' burial.

Tennant becomes the focus of Rankin's inquiry. At the hospital where Tennant was brought, Rankin learns the doctor had been diagnosed with a severe nervous breakdown and was going to be institutionalized, but he and his nurse both vanished without a trace. Rankin takes possession of Tennant's abandoned personal effects, which include a journal containing unusually detailed descriptions of the Strangler's victims and a surgeon's kit with a missing knife. At the Judas Hole, Rankin gleans from Cora that she never saw the Strangler's face, and that Tennant was a regular patron who made unwanted advances towards Martha Stuart. Rankin deduces that Tennant was the real Haymarket Strangler, and suspects that his breakdown was precipitated by him disposing of his knife, the symbol of his homicidal compulsion, in Styles' coffin in a lucid moment when he was overwhelmed by guilt.

Rankin next goes to the Newgate Prison cemetery and surreptitiously exhumes Styles' body. Finding the knife amid the bones, he takes hold of it and undergoes a transformation that contorts his face, paralyzes his left arm, and alters his personality. Rankin returns to the Judas Hole and kills Cora's protege, and as he departs, Cora recognizes him as the Haymarket Strangler. Alternating between himself and the Strangler persona, Rankin murders other women before finally coming to realize that he was Tennant all along. His wife Barbara confirms this, revealing that she was his nurse and fell in love with him. Believing that Tennant had been misdiagnosed, Barbara absconded with him and helped him build a new life as the writer James Rankin. Distressed by these revelations, Rankin reverts into the Strangler, kills Barbara, and runs off. When he returns home the next day to the news that his wife was murdered, Rankin confesses that he is the killer, but no one believes him and he becomes hysterical.

Rankin is committed to Coldbath Fields, a traumatic experience that exacerbates his instability. He again assumes the Strangler persona and escapes after disfiguring a guard and murdering a kitchen maid. Back at his house, Rankin regains his senses before he can kill his daughter Lily. Confronted by the police, he leaps out a window and makes his way to Newgate Prison, where he tries to rebury the knife. The police pursue Rankin there and shoot him. In his last moments, Rankin declares that he and the knife both belong in the cemetery.

== Cast ==
- Boris Karloff as James Rankin
- Jean Kent as Cora Seth
- Elizabeth Allan as Barbara Rankin
- Anthony Dawson as Superintendent Burk
- Vera Day as Pearl
- Tim Turner as Dr. Kenneth McColl
- Diane Aubrey as Lily Rankin
- Max Brimmell as Newgate Prison turnkey
- Leslie Perrins as Newgate Prison Governor
- Jessica Cairns as asylum maid
- Dorothy Gordon as Hannah
- Desmond Roberts as Dr. Johnson
- Michael Atkinson as Edward Styles
- Peggy Anne Clifford as Kate

== Production ==
The film was originally going to be called Stranglehold and was written by Jan Read, a friend of Boris Karloff's. He gave the script to producer Richard Gordon, who was looking to make a horror movie in the UK. Gordon set up Amalgamated Productions with Charles Vetters and had started providing U.S. funding and talent for eight pictures shot in Britain.

Amalgamated went into partnership with British producer John Croydon and negotiated a deal with distributor Eros Films, who agreed to guarantee 70% of the film's budget after delivery of the final product. The remaining 30% of the budget was provided by the National Film Finance Corporation.

The agreement with Eros was conditional on Amalgamated providing a second film, so Gordon arranged to make Fiend Without a Face back to back with a different cast and director. MGM picked up both films for release. Gordon later estimated the cost of the two movies together was approximately £80,000, excluding the costs of imported American stars.

Read's script was rewritten by John Croydon, who brought in the idea of making the killer a Jack the Ripper-type murderer and having the transformation be physical (in the original draft, Rankin was only possessed by the killer's spirit).

The film was shot in Walton Studios in Surrey. Karloff was paid $27,500 for four weeks, with an option to make a second film for Amalgamated.

Executive producer Richard Gordon and interviewer Tom Weaver talk about the making of The Haunted Strangler on the audio commentary of the Criterion DVD, available as part of the 2007 box set Monsters and Madmen.

== Reception ==
=== Box office ===
According to MGM records, this film and Fiend Without a Face together earned $350,000 in the U.S. and Canada and $300,000 elsewhere, resulting in a profit to the studio of $160,000.

=== Critical ===
The Monthly Film Bulletin wrote: "This ludicrously improbable plot, which peters out into a series of tediously repetitive chases, is used as an excuse for the now familiar ingredients of the current horror trend. Karloff and Jean Kent play with well-intentioned earnestness, and Vera Day is as bright as ever in her brief sequences."

In British Sound Films: The Studio Years 1928–1959 David Quinlan rated the film as "average", writing: "Gruesome horror film, quite scary."

== See also ==
- Boris Karloff filmography
