= Fiend Without a Face =

1958 British film by Arthur Crabtree

- US theatrical release poster
- Directed by: Arthur Crabtree
- Written by: Herbert J. Leder
- Based on: "The Thought Monster" by Amelia Reynolds Long
- Produced by: John Croydon
- Starring: Marshall Thompson; Kynaston Reeves; Kim Parker; Stanley Maxted
- Cinematography: Lionel Banes
- Edited by: R. Q. McNaughton
- Music by: Buxton Orr
- Production company: Amalgamated Productions; MLC Productions; Eros Films
- Distributed by: Eros Films (UK); MGM (US)
- Release dates: 3 June 1958 (US); December 1958 (UK)
- Running time: 74 minutes
- Country: United Kingdom
- Language: English
- Budget: £50,000 (estimated)
- Box office: $650,000 (on double bill)

Fiend Without a Face is a 1958 British science-fiction horror film directed by Arthur Crabtree and starring Marshall Thompson, Kynaston Reeves, Kim Parker, and Stanley Maxted in his final film role. The screenplay by Herbert J. Leder is based on Amelia Reynolds Long's short story "The Thought Monster", originally published in the March 1930 issue of Weird Tales magazine.

In the film, a scientist on a American air base air base in Canada experiments with the materialisation of thought waves through atomic energy, which ultimately take the form of malevolent invisible killer brains, which then materialize as flying brains with attached spinal columns and eyestalks, strangling people with their spinal cords.

Fiend Without a Face was produced independently by John Croydon and Richard Gordon for Amalgamated Productions, and distributed in the United Kingdom by Eros Films in December 1958.

== Plot ==
US Air Force Interceptor Command Experimental Station No. 6 is a long-range radar installation located in rural Winthrop, Manitoba, Canada. (Note: Winthrop, Manitoba is a fictional location.) Unexplained deaths begin to occur in the general area of a farming village near the American base. Postmortems reveal the victims were murdered and the brains and spinal cords are missing from the corpses; the only clue left behind are two puncture marks at the base of each skull. The locals, however, become convinced that radiation leaks from the radar installation's nuclear-power experiments are the cause of the mysterious deaths.

Air Force Major Jeff Cummings begins an investigation as the local deaths continue, interviewing various townsfolk, while looking for anything unusual. Cummings becomes suspicious of Professor R. E. Walgate, a retired British scientist living near the airbase; Walgate is in the process of writing another book about his ongoing experiments with telekinesis, this time as it applies to thought projection. Major Cummings' suspicion of Walgate is later proved to be correct. The scientist finally admits he has not only succeeded in developing his mental ability, but in the process created a living thought projection. Unknown to Professor Walgate, the nuclear power radar experiments underway at the nearby US airbase have greatly enhanced his mental abilities to the point that, through him, his living thought projection has become a malevolent and invisible new life form. It escaped from Walgate's laboratory and is now attacking humans as a means of replicating physical, though still invisible, new versions of itself, all of which are now feeding on the base's nuclear-generated power.

The invisible creatures eventually attack and kill the military personnel at the airbase in order to take over control of the radar station's nuclear reactor; two of them dial-up the power to very dangerous levels. As they do so all the creatures suddenly become visible. Their now visible bodies are revealed to be the missing brains with spinal cords stolen from their victims; their spinal cords have become very flexible and have now sprouted tendrils. These mutations also allow the brain-spine creatures to move quickly and even leap distances; each brain-spine has also developed a pair of small eyes at the ends of extended eye stalks.

The slithering creations then attack Walgate's home, where most of the film's principal characters have gathered to discuss the crisis. Some of the brains get inside by breaking through a boarded-up window using their tendrils, while others leap to the roof and slither down through the fireplace's open flue. Some of the defenders are attacked and killed, but well-aimed .45 semi-automatic pistol shots to the brains soon make short work of most of the attacking creatures; they gorily bleed out as they expire.

Walgate exits his home as a diversion, but is quickly attacked and killed by his creation. Meanwhile, Major Cummings escapes out the back way and quickly heads to the airbase, where he saves the day by blowing up the radar installation's power machinery. This immediately robs the surviving brains of their high-energy food source, and the creatures quickly die, dissolving into puddles of goo.

== Cast ==
- Marshall Thompson as Maj. Jeff Cummings
- Kynaston Reeves as Prof. R. E. Walgate
- Kim Parker as Barbara Griselle
- Stanley Maxted as Col. Butler
- Terry Kilburn as Cpt. Al Chester
- James Dyrenforth as Mayor Hawkins
- Robert MacKenzie as Constable Howard Gibbons
- Peter Madden as Dr. Bradley
- Gil Winfield as Dr. Warren
- Michael Balfour as Sgt. Kasper
- Launce Maraschal as Melville
- Meadows White as Ben Adams
- Lala Lloyd as Amelia Adams
- E. Kerrigan Prescott as Pete, plant engineer
- Shane Cordell as Nurse

== Production ==
Period stock footage of USAF aircraft was featured in Fiend Without a Face.

Noted science fiction personality, collector, and literary agent Forrest J Ackerman represented mystery and science fiction pulp writer Long and brokered the sale of her story "The Thought Monster" to the film's producers. New York-based British producer and distributor Richard Gordon bought the film rights, and produced the film through his London company Amalgamated Productions, which he co-owned with former Rank executive John Croydon.

Screenwriter Leder was originally set to direct the film, but being American, was unable to obtain a British work permit in time, so Crabtree replaced him as director. Thompson later said that when the director showed up on the first day of shooting and looked at the script, Crabtree claimed it was not the film he had been hired to direct, as he did not do "monster" films. After a heated argument with the producers, Crabtree left the set and did not show up for a week. In the interim, Thompson himself directed the film.

Fiend Without a Face was made entirely in England. Its Canadian setting was chosen because it would appeal to both American and British Commonwealth movie audiences, while still being easy to replicate using the English shooting locations. U. S. Air Force stock aviation footage was also used to establish the military base setting and to pad out the film's meager running time. The producers used primarily expatriate American and Canadian actors working in the United Kingdom, plus a few British actors. Some of the British actors were later dubbed with North American accents.

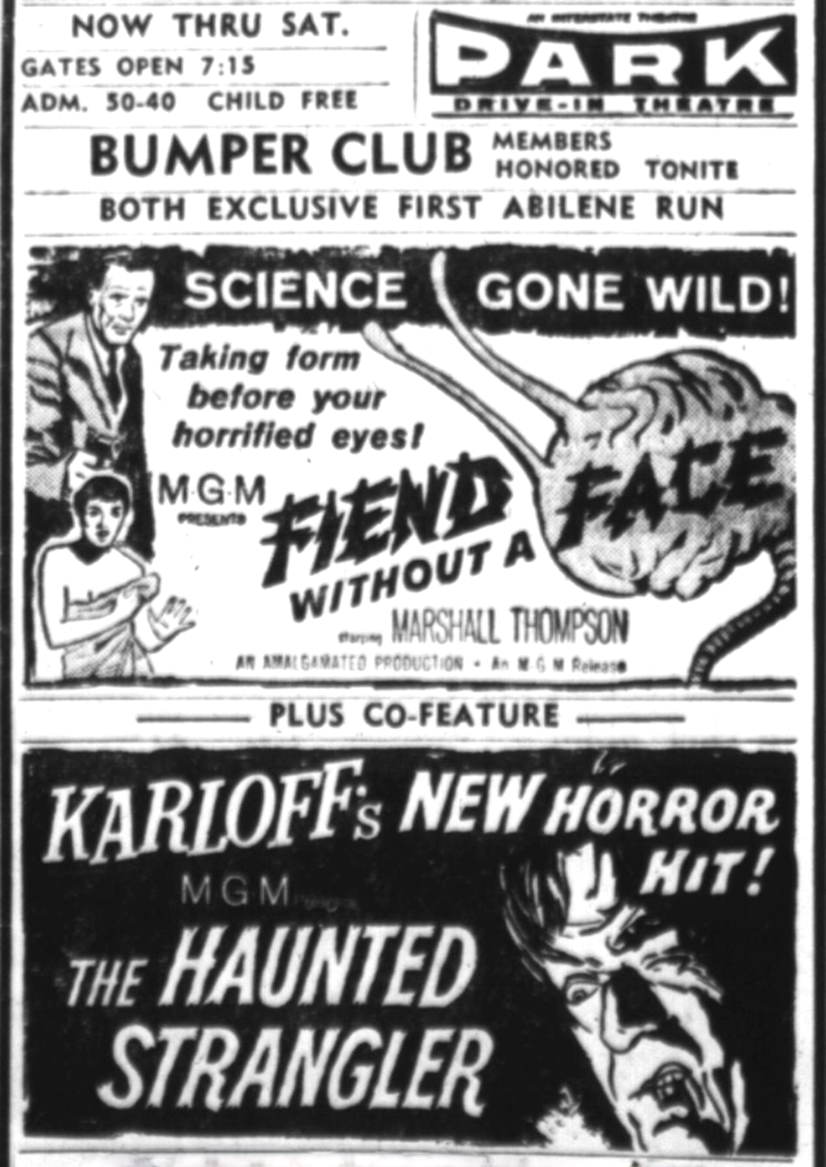
Advertisement from 1958 for Fiend Without a Face and co-feature, The Haunted Strangler

The film's visible brain creatures were created using stop-motion animation, an unusual practice for such a low-budget science fiction thriller of this era. The director of these effects sequences was Florenz "Flo" von Nordoff, while the actual stop-motion was done in Munich by Nordhoff's partner, West German special effects artist Karl Ludwig Ruppel. Peter Neilson headed up the British practical effects crew.

== Release ==
During July 1958, Fiend Without a Face first opened in the United States at the Rialto Theatre in New York City's Theater District. The film's producers placed an outdoor, front-of-the-house exhibit near the sidewalk that showcased a "living and breathing Fiend" in a steel-barred glass display case. It periodically moved its spinal cord tail, startling onlookers, and also made menacing sounds with the help of a concealed electrical device. The crowds that gathered to watch the caged Fiend grew so large that NYC police finally ordered the display case removed because it was creating a public disturbance.

In the US, the film was released in June 1958 by MGM as a double feature with The Haunted Strangler (1958), also produced by Croydon and Gordon.

Five months later, Fiend Without a Face created a public uproar after its British premiere at the Ritz Theatre in Leicester Square in London's West End. The British Board of Film Censors had demanded a number of cuts before its release and finally granted the film an "X" certificate, but newspaper critics were still aghast at its horrifying special effects. Questions were actually raised in Parliament as to why British censors had allowed Fiend Without a Face to be released, notably: "What is the British film industry thinking by trying to beat Hollywood at its own game of overdosing on blood and gore". Richard Gordon later commented "I never could have afforded to buy that publicity."

=== Home media ===
The Criterion Collection, a video company known for its painstaking restorations of various film classics, released a deluxe DVD edition of Fiend Without a Face in 2007, having previously released it on LaserDisc.

A high-definition video transfer, created on a Spirit DataCine from a 35 mm film print, was struck from the film's original negative. Thousands of pieces of dirt, debris and scratches were removed using the MTI Digital Restoration System. For optimal image quality, Criterion also encoded the dual-layer DVD-9 at the highest possible bit rate. The film's original monaural soundtrack was remastered at 24-bit, and audio restoration tools were used to eliminate clicks, pops, hisses and crackles.

Criterion added these bonus DVD features to their release:

- A new widescreen 1.66: 1 transfer with a complete digital picture restoration enhanced for 16×9 hi-def televisions.
- Audio commentary: a conversation with executive producer Gordon and genre film writer Tom Weaver.
- An illustrated essay on British science fiction/horror film making by film historian Bruce Eder.
- A collection of movie trailers from various Gordon films: Fiend without a Face, The Haunted Strangler, Corridors of Blood, First Man into Space and The Atomic Submarine.
- Rare still photographs and ephemera, with audio commentary.
- Vintage advertisements and lobby cards.
- New English subtitles for the deaf and hearing impaired.
- A new DVD cover art design by David Cohen.

== Reception ==
=== Box office ===
According to MGM records, Fiend Without a Face was released on a double bill with The Haunted Strangler. Together, the two films earned $350,000 in the United States and Canada, and $300,000 in England and elsewhere. The estimated production budget for Fiend Without a Face was £50,000 ($140,000); MGM realized a profit of $160,000 on the movie.

While Fiend Without a Face was not a major hit, it was one of the more successful British films released in the U.S. in 1958. Unexpectedly, it performed better in the South, Midwest, and California than in the Northeast, where U.K. imports were usually more well received. (Note: An unusually large portion of the movie's North American box office receipts came from Mississippi, Arkansas, Alabama, Georgia, North Carolina, South Carolina, Tennessee, Illinois, Wisconsin, Michigan, and Indiana, as well as southern California. The film did "okay" in New Jersey, but the only states in the Northeast in which it did "very well" were Pennsylvania, Massachusetts, and Rhode Island; it also was successful in the very small markets in Maine.) MGM was also surprised by market research showing Fiend Without a Face to be a "stronger draw by far" than its companion release, The Haunted Strangler, which failed to generate much audience interest.

=== Critical response ===
The Monthly Film Bulletin wrote: "For the most part this is tepidly macabre. What may give the film a special interest for devotees of the genre is the final scene in which the creatures, hitherto invisible, appear as mobile brains with proboscis projections and trailing tails; the anatomical device whereby they are able to fly through the air as well is not explained. The trick photography is the best for a long time and the monsters have been devised with a certain amount of originality."

A reviewer for Harrison's Reports wrote in May 1958, "Up until the last two reels, this British-made science-fiction-horror program horror melodrama is fairly interesting in the usual fantastic sort of way, because it deals with unexplained, invisible monsters who strangle their victims and supposedly suck out their brains and spinal cords. During the final fifteen minutes, however, the picture, instead of being mystifying or horrifying, is just plain revolting, to an extent that even those with strong stomachs may not be able to take it ... Because of its excessive gore, the picture is too unpalatable to be classified as entertainment."

In contrast, a reviewer for Motion Picture Daily in June 1958 wrote, "This entry in the science fiction, horror division sweepstakes is well and logically constructed, capably acted and directed with an eye toward building suspense. The cast is substantially unknown but exploitation of the horror angle is indicated and should be effective."

Later reviews concentrated on the low production values and lack of a cohesive plot, but with a 67% "Fresh" rating at the review aggregator website Rotten Tomatoes, Fiend Without a Face now is considered one of the best B movies of the 1950s.

James Rolfe called the film the "best killer brain movie ever" and stated that "it may be the goriest film of its time".

Leonard Maltin noted the film's "horrific climax, [and] good special effects." Marcella Papandrea of The Super Network said, "While the film gets off to a bit of a rocky start, it finds its footing fairly quickly though and it becomes quite immersive and intense."

The Radio Times Guide to Films gave the film 3/5 stars, writing: "Arthur Crabtree's Quatermass-style shocker starts off pretty ordinarily but, once the flying spinal cords whip into throat-choking action, the screams you hear may well be your own! British to the core, despite the pseudo-American trappings and fading Hollywood actor Marshall Thompson taking centre stage."

Leslie Halliwell said: "Tepid shocker with well-organised mobile brains."

In British Sound Films: The Studio Years 1928–1959 David Quinlan rated the film as "average", writing: "Dreary horror film whose only (considerable) interest lies in the special effects, ahead of their time."

== Remakes ==
On 22 March 2010, Roy Frumkes confirmed to Fangoria magazine that he planned to produce a remake of the film in 2011.

The online website Dread Central offered an October 2013 update from Frumkes on his Fiend Without a Face remake:

I've wanted to do this film for 40 years, so I already had it all in my head, and it wasn't hard to write. What I didn't have was the technical information; I'm no science buff. Now I'm interviewing scientists, getting the technology straight. It's set in a think tank in the Berkshires, and it's not about young people. It's a mature film, but it has a Street Trash sensibility, so the people who like my work will not be disappointed.

The website also posted a still from a fundraising trailer that Frumkes had shot for the remake with director Franco Frassetti. As of April 2023, that remake has yet to materialize.

Montreal-based filmmaker Rémi Fréchette produced, co-wrote and directed a web series (2013) and a horror comedy feature film (2014), both called Les Jaunes, which shared the themes and images of Fiend Without a Face, including the military aspects, rural setting, and energy-based brain creatures. In Les Jaunes, an epidemic of yellow crawling brains threatens the lives of the inhabitants of Fort Vince, a reclusive Northern Quebec town.

== See also ==
- List of cult films
