= Maria Gardena =

Italian film actress and architect

- Born: 1920; Bolzano, Kingdom of Italy
- Died: 2008 (aged 88); Bolzano, Italy
- Other name: Herthilde Gabloner
- Occupations: Actress, architect
- Years active: 1939–1944 (actress)

Maria Gardena (born Herthilde Maria Gabloner; 1920 –3 Mar 2008) was an Italian film actress and later architect.

Herthilde Gabloner was the daughter of sculptor Ignaz Gabloner and studied architecture in Rome. During those years had a brief acting career. Her last film was The Children Are Watching Us (1944), directed by Vittorio De Sica.

A short documentary on her life, Herthilde Gabloner/Maria Gardena: La donna che visse due volte (Herthilde Gabloner/Maria Gardena: The Woman Who Lived Twice) by Franco Delli Guanti and Ludovico Maillet was screened at the 36th Bolzano Film Festival Bozen in 2023. The 2005 short documentary, Architette. Racconti di vita e di lavoro di tre pioniere dell'architettura (Women Architects: Stories of the Lives and Work of Three Architectural Pioneers) by Lorenzo Paccagnella, told the life stories of Gabloner, Jolanda Zamolo Dalla Bona, and Helga Ehall-Hofer.

Gabloner published her autobiography Chi tira i fili? Racconto autobiografico di Hertlinde Gabloner, in arte Maria Gardenia (Who's Pulling the Strings? An Autobiographical Story by Hertlinde Gabloner, a.k.a. Maria Gardenia) in 2004. She died on March 3, 2008, in Ritten, Italy.

== Filmography ==
- La mia canzone al vento, directed by Guido Brignone (1939)
- Retroscena (Backstage), directed by Alessandro Blasetti (1939) (uncredited)
- Ho visto brillare le stelle, directed by Enrico Guazzoni (1939)
- L'ultimo addio, directed by Ferruccio Cerio (1942)
- Una volta alla settimana (Once a Week), directed by Ákos Ráthonyi (1942)
- I bambini ci guardano (The Children are Watching Us), directed by Vittorio De Sica (1944)
