= Once a Week (film) =

1942 film

- Directed by: Ákos Ráthonyi
- Written by: Vincenzo Rovi; Ákos Ráthonyi
- Produced by: Franco Vaghi
- Starring: Roberto Villa; Vera Carmi; Titina De Filippo
- Cinematography: Renato Del Frate
- Edited by: Otello Colangeli
- Music by: Alexandre Derevitsky
- Production companies: Industrie Nazionali Associate Cinematografiche; Società Anonima Generale Italiana Film
- Distributed by: Titanus
- Release date: 27 June 1942
- Running time: 85 minutes
- Country: Italy
- Language: Italian

Once a Week (Italian: Una volta alla settimana) is a 1942 Italian comedy film directed by Ákos Ráthonyi and starring Roberto Villa, Vera Carmi and Titina De Filippo. It was shot at the Farnesina Studios of Titanus in Rome. The film's sets were designed by the art director Gastone Medin.

== Cast ==
- Roberto Villa as Alberto - il pittore
- Vera Carmi as Laura Macrè - sua fanciulla
- Titina De Filippo as La direttrice del collegio
- Carlo Campanini as Pietro - amico del pittore
- Armando Migliari as Giacomo Macrè - padre di Laura
- Amina Pirani Maggi as Signora Maria
- Franca Volpini as Rosa, la cameriera
- Daniella Drei as Irene
- Maria Gardena as Lilli
- Elide Spada as Collegiale
- Claudio Ermelli as Antonio - cameriere del 'Caffè della Posta'
- Nicola Maldacea as Il signor Notti
- Romolo Costa as Dottore Enrico Sarti
- Arturo Bragaglia as Isegnante di pianoforte
- Giulio Alfieri as Il cliente sordo al 'Caffè della Posta'
- Michele Malaspina as Dottore Bellini

== Bibliography ==
- Casadio, Gianfranco, Laura, Ernesto G. and Cristiano, Filippo. Telefoni bianchi: realtà e finzione nella società e nel cinema italiano degli anni Quaranta. Longo, 1991.
- Reich, Jacqueline Beth. Fascism, Film, and Female Subjectivity: The Case of Italian Cinema 1936-1943. University of California, Berkeley, 1994.
