= List of British films of 1944 =

A list of films produced in the United Kingdom in 1944:

== 1944 ==
Title	Director	Cast	Genre	Notes
1944
Aventure Malgache	Alfred Hitchcock	Molière Players	World War II	French-language short propaganda film
Bees in Paradise	Val Guest	Arthur Askey, Anne Shelton	Musical/comedy	
Bell-Bottom George	Marcel Varnel	George Formby, Anne Firth	Comedy	
Bon Voyage	Alfred Hitchcock	John Blythe, Molière Players	World War II	French-language short propaganda film
Candlelight in Algeria	George King	James Mason, Carla Lehmann	War	
Candles at Nine	John Harlow	Eliot Makeham, Beatrix Lehmann	Mystery	
A Canterbury Tale	Michael Powell, Emeric Pressburger	Eric Portman, Sheila Sim, Dennis Price, Sgt. John Sweet	World War II	
Champagne Charlie	Alberto Cavalcanti	Tommy Trinder, Stanley Holloway	Musical	
Don't Take It to Heart	Jeffrey Dell	Richard Greene, David Horne	Comedy	
Dreaming	John Baxter	Bud Flanagan, Chesney Allen	Comedy	
English Without Tears	Harold French	Michael Wilding, Penelope Dudley-Ward, Lilli Palmer	Comedy	
Fanny by Gaslight	Anthony Asquith	Phyllis Calvert, James Mason, Stewart Granger	Drama	
Fiddlers Three	Harry Watt	Tommy Trinder, Frances Day, James Robertson Justice	Comedy	
For Those in Peril	Charles Crichton	David Farrar, Ralph Michael	World War II	
Give Us the Moon	Val Guest	Margaret Lockwood, Vic Oliver	Comedy	
The Halfway House	Basil Dearden	Mervyn Johns, Tom Walls	Drama	
He Snoops to Conquer	Marcel Varnel	George Formby, Robertson Hare	Comedy	
Headline	John Harlow	David Farrar, Anne Crawford	Thriller	
Heaven Is Round the Corner	Will Fyffe	Leni Lynn, Leslie Perrins	Musical	
Henry V	Laurence Olivier	Laurence Olivier, Renée Asherson	Shakespearean drama	Number 18 in the list of BFI Top 100 British films; Academy Award winner
Hotel Reserve	Lance Comfort, Mutz Greenbaum, Victor Hanbury	James Mason, Lucie Mannheim	Espionage	
The Hundred Pound Window	Brian Desmond Hurst	Anne Crawford, David Farrar	Crime	
It Happened One Sunday	Karel Lamač	Robert Beatty, Barbara White	Romance/comedy	
It's in the Bag	Herbert Mason	Elsie Waters, Doris Waters	Comedy	
Love Story	Leslie Arliss	Margaret Lockwood, Stewart Granger, Patricia Roc	Romance/drama	
Medal for the General	Maurice Elvey	Godfrey Tearle, Jeanne De Casalis	Comedy	
Mr. Emmanuel	Harold French	Felix Aylmer, Greta Gynt, Walter Rilla	Drama	
On Approval	Clive Brook	Beatrice Lillie, Googie Withers, Roland Culver	Comedy	
One Exciting Night	Walter Forde	Vera Lynn, Donald Stewart	Musical	
Strawberry Roan	Maurice Elvey	William Hartnell, Carol Raye	Drama	
Target for Today	William Keighley	U.S. Army Air Force personnel	World War II documentary	
Tawny Pipit	Bernard Miles, Charles Saunders	Bernard Miles, Rosamund John, Niall MacGinnis	Comedy	
They Came to a City	Basil Dearden	John Clements, Googie Withers	Drama	
This Happy Breed	David Lean	Robert Newton, Celia Johnson, Stanley Holloway	Drama	Noël Coward's play
Time Flies	Walter Forde	Tommy Handley, Evelyn Dall	Comedy	
Tunisian Victory	Frank Capra, John Huston	Burgess Meredith, Bernard Miles	Propaganda	co-produced with USA
Two Thousand Women	Frank Launder	Phyllis Calvert, Flora Robson, Patricia Roc	Drama	
The Volunteer	Michael Powell, Emeric Pressburger	Ralph Richardson, Laurence Olivier	World War II	Short Film
The Way Ahead	Carol Reed	David Niven, Raymond Huntley, William Hartnell	World War II	
Welcome, Mr. Washington	Leslie S. Hiscott	Barbara Mullen, Donald Stewart	Drama	

== See also ==
- 1944 in British music
- 1944 in British television
- 1944 in the United Kingdom
