= Anton Rippon =

English writer

Anton Rippon (born 20 December 1944) is a British award-winning newspaper columnist, journalist, author and publisher.

== Career as a journalist ==
ANTON RIPPON was born in Derby and grew up there. He has spent almost all his working life in the newspaper and publishing industry including working as a reporter for the Derby Evening Telegraph and as a feature writer for the Nottingham Evening Post. He was a football writer for the Sunday Telegraph, covering the Midlands and South Yorkshire, and editor of the Footballer Magazine and the Sports Journalists' Association of Great Britain Year Book and he also worked for Derby County's media department. As a freelance his work has appeared in a wide range of national newspapers and magazines including The Guardian, The Times and The Independent and he has written radio documentaries for the BBC. He has appeared on BBC TV, ITV and Sky Sports. In 1982, he founded Breedon Books, the sports and history publisher that he sold in 2003 to resume writing full-time.

== Published books on sport and wartime history ==
He is the author of more than 60 books, on sport and wartime history, and including an autobiographical memoir A Derby Boy, which was published in 2007. His book Gunter Plüschow: Airman, Escaper, Explorer, was published by Pen & Sword in 2009. A collection of his columns from the Derby Telegraph – A Derby View – was published by Wharncliffe in October 2010.

He worked with showbusiness stars Sir Norman Wisdom, Max Bygraves and Bill Maynard on the publishing of their respective autobiographies.

He was a member of the editorial team for the 2010 FIFA World Cup Official Book.

His latest book Soccer Scandals: When the Beautiful Game Turned Ugly was published by Pen & Sword in March 2025.

His forebears include Major Sir Richard Whieldon Barnett MP, who represented Great Britain at rifle shooting in the 1908 Summer Olympics; Thomas Whieldon, the respected potter and business partner of Josiah Wedgwood.

== Honorary degrees and awards ==
In 2016 the University of Derby awarded him an honorary master's degree for services to journalism.

Rippon was named Newspaper Columnist of the Year in the 2017 Midlands Media Awards.

In 1993, the Derby County Former Professional Players' Association elected him an honorary member, and in 2015 named him as the recipient of its annual merit award for services to the club.

== Award judge ==
He served as a judge for the British Sports Journalism Awards.

== Temporary retirement and columns about the COVID-19 pandemic ==
In April 2019, Rippon ended the column that he had written every week in the Derby (Evening)Telegraph for the past 20 years (over 1,000 in all) as well as the Derby County column that he had written for the past 10 years. He also covered news stories for the paper, and news features on subjects such as the work of Macmillan Cancer nurses, and the NHS contaminated blood scandal.

Rippon then signed a deal with Pen & Sword Publishers. His Britain 1940: The Decisive Year on the Home Front was published in March 2020. Books on Liverpool FC and Arsenal FC followed. He also co-authored several books on wartime history with his daughter, Nicola Rippon.

During the 2020-21 COVID-19 pandemic, he rejoined the Derby Telegraph, writing a column initially entitled 'Anton in Lockdown', and again contributing feature articles. In January 2026 he began a new series in the Derby Telegraph entitled Anton Rippon's Derby County Memories .

== Selected bibliography ==
- Folktales and Legends of Derbyshire, Minimax, 1982, ISBN 978-0-906791-20-2
- Gas Masks for Goal Posts: football in Britain during the Second World War, Sutton, 2005, ISBN 978-0-7509-4030-6
- Hitler's Olympics: the story of the 1936 Nazi Games, Pen & Sword military classics (Series), Pen & Sword, 2006, ISBN 978-1-84415-444-9
- A Derby View: the best of Anton Rippon, Wharncliffe, 2010, ISBN 978-1-84563-137-6
- 2014 How Britain Kept Calm and Carried On: True stories from the Home Front, Michael O'Mara ISBN 178243190X
- Gunter Plüschow: Airman, Escaper, Explorer, Pen & Sword, 2009, ISBN 978-1848841321

https://www.pen-and-sword.co.uk/Britain-1940-Hardback/p/17296
