= Frank Bury =

British composer

Frank James Lindsay Bury (1910 – 11 July 1944) was a British composer. He studied music at Cambridge University and attended the Royal College of Music, where he was a student of Malcolm Sargent and Gordon Jacob. Bury also studied under Bruno Walter.

Bury was the founder of the Ludlow Choral Society. He was killed in July 1944 while serving as a commando during the Normandy airborne landings.

Among his works is a Prelude and Fugue in E flat for two pianos.
