= Stanley Maxted =

Canadian singer, journalist and actor (1895–1963)

Stanley Herbert Maxted
- Born: Stanley Herbert Maxted; 21 August 1895; Folkestone, Kent, England
- Died: 10 May 1963 (aged 67); London, England
- Occupations: Soldier, singer, radio producer, journalist, actor
- Known for: World War II reporting for BBC
- Military career
- Allegiance: Canada; United Kingdom
- Rank: Major
- Units: Canadian Expeditionary Force; Eaton's Machine Gun Battery; Royal Field Artillery; Royal Regiment of Canadian Artillery; 27th Field Battery
- Conflicts: World War I; Western Front; Battle of Passchendaele; World War II; Operation Overlord; Operation Market Garden; Battle of Arnhem; Operation Varsity; Occupation of Japan

Stanley Herbert Maxted (21 August 1895 – 10 May 1963) was an English-Canadian soldier, singer, radio producer, journalist and actor. He worked for the Canadian Broadcasting Corporation (CBC) and later for the British Broadcasting Corporation (BBC) as a war correspondent during World War II. Following the war, he became an actor.

Maxted was a British home child who came to Toronto, Ontario, Canada in 1906 via Fegan Homes. He enlisted in 1915 and fought in World War I. Twice wounded and gassed during the First World War, he survived and became a singer. In the 1930s, he began working for the CBC as a journalist.

Maxted was seconded to work for the BBC in England during the Second World War. Maxted was present at D-Day and the Battle of Arnhem alongside fellow BBC reporter Guy Byam and newspaper reporters Alan Wood of the Daily Express and Jack Smyth of Reuters. Maxted later covered the war in the Pacific in 1945, which he described as more difficult than reporting from Europe due to the distances covered.

== Early life ==
Stanley Herbert Maxted was born on 21 August 1895 in Folkestone, Kent, England to Fanny Emma (née Sanderson) and Herbert Hope Maxted. After his parents' marriage failed, he was taken into care by Fegan Homes (founded by the nonconformist evangelist J. W. C. Fegan) and immigrated to Canada in 1906. Contrary to Fegan's policy of placing young boys on farms to serve as labourers, Maxted boarded as a teenager with the family of Dr. Malcolm Sparrow, a prominent dentist and amateur tenor residing in the Parkdale district of Toronto. Living with the Sparrows afforded Maxted the opportunity to attend Toronto's Parkdale Collegiate Institute, where he won two scholarships and excelled in sports. Maxted also reportedly studied singing privately under the tutelage of the renowned voice instructor Otto Morando.

Following high school, Maxted began forestry studies at the University of Toronto, but the First World War began and he only completed one term before dropping out to enlist.

== Military service and early career ==
Stanley Maxted enlisted in the Canadian Expeditionary Force at Toronto on 10 February 1915. He named his mother, Mrs. Fanny Maxted of Folkestone, Kent, England, as his next of kin on his attestation papers. Maxted was assigned to Eaton's Machine Gun Battery upon his enlistment, and was promoted to the rank of corporal before departing for England with his battalion in June 1915. By a great coincidence, upon arrival in England, Maxted was based in his hometown of Folkestone for training. In December 1915, Maxted received a commission as a lieutenant in the British Royal Field Artillery.

Maxted moved to the war front in France on 1 March 1916, and immediately saw action. He was wounded three times during the war. In September 1916, he injured his back when a shell blast caused a heavy timber to fall on him. On 31 July 1917 he was shot in his right thigh and suffered from the effects of a gas attack. And then on 6 October 1917 during the Battle of Passchendaele he was gassed a second time, causing long term respiratory problems and rendering him speechless for a time.

Maxted returned to Canada on 14 February 1918, and stayed with the Sparrow family to convalesce. After his recovery, he was sent on home assignment to CFB Borden. He was honorably discharged in January 1919 with the rank of lieutenant.

Finding employment in post-war Canada was a challenge, so Maxted headed south to Pittsburgh, Pennsylvania in the United States in 1919. He found work as an oven builder for the booming steel town coke industry. Maxted lived in Pittsburgh for three years.

He was promoted to a foreman. But the work exacerbated his lingering respiratory problems caused by wartime gas exposure, so he returned to Canada where he engaged in sales for the lumber industry.

While living at Montreal in the late 1920s, Maxted joined the 27th Field Battery reserve force of the Canadian Field Artillery. By 1928, he was promoted to the rank of captain, and by 1929, he held the rank of major.

== Singing and radio career ==
After returning to Canada, Maxted began to actively explore singing once again, reportedly on the advice of a doctor to help strengthen his lungs. By 1927, Maxted was gaining prominence as a tenor in Montreal and began performing regularly with the Montreal Elgar Choir.

By 1929, Maxted was rising in fame on the Canadian national music scene, especially as a performer of A. A. Milne's poetry collection When We Were Very Young, which had been set to music by Harold Fraser-Simson. Maxted received high praise from critics across the country for his humor and artistry in singing Milne's works. Augustus Bridle, the arts critic for the Toronto Daily Star, who himself had been a British Home Child, wrote of Maxted: "He has a delightful voice, as ductile as spun glass in the making." In the fall of 1929, Stanley Maxted was a featured performer in the Canadian Pacific Railway Concert Series, which saw him performing the A.A. Milne works on tour in major cities across the country.

In 1930, Maxted signed a contract with the Columbia Broadcasting System in New York City, singing live on five different radio programs weekly. Maxted also continued to perform regularly for Canadian audiences. One of his biggest concert events was performing for a broadcast on 1 June 1931 aboard the maiden voyage of the new Canadian Pacific ship RMS Empress of Britain, billed as the largest and fastest ship travelling between England and Canada.

In 1933, Maxted's health forced him to return to Toronto, where he took a position as a regional program director with the Canadian Radio Commission (the immediate precursor of the CBC). In an article published in the Ottawa Citizen in November 1933, Maxted gave advice to other radio singers: "Sing the good things whenever you can. Sing in concert as often as possible, for radio tends to give a man a small voice." After joining the Canadian Radio Commission, Maxted continued to perform at concerts across North America, and even began composing his own songs as well.

In May 1937, six months after the formation of the Canadian Broadcasting Corporation, Maxted went to London, England to work with commercial radio interests. He returned to Canada in September 1939 at the outset of World War II.

== WWII journalist ==
At the start of the second world war, Maxted produced the Carry On, Canada! radio show for the CBC, which used short radio dramas to encourage Canadian men to join the army and others to donate to the war effort. In October 1940, Maxted was loaned from the CBC to the BBC as a producer and commentator. Upon his return to London, he began to produce a variety of radio entertainment programs in a West End theatre with a live audience, a practice that was more commonly found in North American studios. As a commentator, the feature he was best known for was the program Off the Record, which was also broadcast to North American audiences on the BBC shortwave North American Service. By 1942, Maxted's five-minute talks regarding blackout precautions and air raid survival tips during the London Blitz had become so popular with American audiences that the BBC initiated a weekly shortwave broadcast.

In 1943, after being anxious to get into the action, Maxted joined the BBC's corps of war reporters. This required training with troops on maneuvers and getting used to the job of handling portable radio equipment in the field.

On 4 June Maxted went aboard the lead of the 9th Minesweeping Flotilla, HMS Sidmouth, as Allied forces prepared to invade France. The flotilla’s instructions were to sweep one of the ten passages in the Germans’ huge outer screen minefield some 5–10 miles off-shore. The 9th MF was assigned ‘Channel 7’ through which Force ‘J’ would proceed to the Juno Beaches - which were largely taken by Canadian forces. In this way, minesweepers were the first vessels to approach the coast of France in the early hours of 6 June. It was from HMS Sidmouth that Maxted broadcast one of the first reports of D-Day for the BBC.

On 16 September 1944, Maxted was summoned to a briefing regarding Operation Market Garden, an attempt by the Western Allies to gain a foothold in German-held territory in the Netherlands. Maxted was told that he and other members of the press, including Alan Wood of the Daily Express, would be accompanying British troops of the 1st Airborne Division (the 'Red Devils') as part of an invasion on the far side of the Rhine River. The objective was to secure the bridge at the Dutch town of Arnhem. Maxted and the other journalists were given seats aboard a glider plane that was loaded with equipment and supplies, while most of the division landed as paratroopers. After initial success upon landing, the Battle of Arnhem became increasingly desperate for the British. The planned reinforcements never arrived by land, and Allied supply planes inadvertently dropped ammunition and food rations right into German hands. Maxted sent dispatches almost daily to report on the action at Arnhem. Eventually the remaining soldiers of the 1st Airborne Division were completely surrounded at Arnhem, and were ordered to withdraw in a midnight escape. Maxted recounted crawling with the men through mud and rain to reach the Rhine River where Allied boats under machine gun fire carried them to safety on the other side. Maxted's account of the Battle of Arnhem can be read in a Maclean's article from Nov 1944 entitled I Was at Arnhem.

Just weeks following his escape from Arnhem, Maxted returned to Canada on 2 November 1944, where he told his story widely. He also performed in the seventh Victory Loan Star Show that was broadcast coast to coast in Canada on 8 November 1944.

Maxted returned to England and his work as a BBC war correspondent shortly afterwards. In March 1945, he landed with the 6th Airborne Division as part of Operation Varsity on the far side of the Rhine. He recounted the harrowing landing and the events that followed in another Maclean's article, I Crossed the Rhine with the Glider Troops.

In May 1945, Maxted briefly passed through Canada on his way to report on the war in the Pacific. Maxted was with the first Allied persons to land at Tokyo, after which he accompanied British and Canadian naval units to Hong Kong. He was also aboard the U.S.S. Missouri when Japanese representatives came on board to sign surrender on 2 September 1945.

Following the war, it was reported that a card bearing Stanley Maxted's name was found in the records of the Gestapo offices in Berlin, along with a list of the broadcasts he had made for the BBC. Reportedly, one broadcast was noted as being particularly disliked by Nazi leader Heinrich Himmler.

Maxted returned to Toronto once again on 29 December 1945 after the close of the war, but his stay in Canada was short-lived. In 1946, he was back in Europe filming, Theirs is the Glory, a documentary that recruited surviving veterans to re-enact the Battle of Arnhem using the actual devastated buildings at Arnhem as the set. Maxted both narrated and appeared as himself in the film.

== Acting career ==
After his film debut in Theirs is the Glory, Sir Laurence Olivier asked Maxted to join the cast of Born Yesterday on stage at the Garrick Theatre in London in 1947. In 1949, he appeared in The Way Back at the Westminster Theatre, which also starred Richard Attenborough.

After providing narration for the documentary films, The Victory Parade (1946) and Oslo 1947 (1947), Maxted appeared in an uncredited role in the comedy film I Was a Male War Bride starring Cary Grant. Maxted continued to add to his acting credits until 1958, when his health began to decline. His last acting role was in the sci-fi horror film Fiend Without a Face in 1958. His performances included five episodes of BBC Sunday-Night Theatre, a series of television plays performed live.

== Personal life ==
Stanley Maxted married Olga Juhler of Toronto on 14 August 1921 in Pittsburgh. The couple had four children and divorced in January 1946. Maxted remarried to Charlotte Elgitha Veronica Boswell Eliott, the daughter of an American-born Scottish Baronet.

In his later years, Maxted experienced worsening lung problems, likely the result of his exposure to gas in WWI. He died on 10 May 1963 in a hospital in London after suffering a heart attack. In obituaries published in Canada and the UK, Maxted was noted primarily for being the "Voice at Arnhem."

== Filmography ==
=== Film ===
Year	Title	Role	Notes
1949	I Was a Male War Bride	U.S. Consul in Heidelberg	Uncredited
1953	The Net	Prof. Adams	
1953	Never Let Me Go	John Barnes	
1953	The Final Test	Senator	
1954	The Love Lottery	Stanton	
1955	I Am a Camera	Curtis B. Ryland	
1956	Ett kungligt äventyr	J G Parker	
1956	It's Never Too Late	Lee Sax	
1956	The Weapon	Colonel	
1957	Across the Bridge	Milton	
1957	Campbell's Kingdom	Henry Fergus	
1958	The Strange Awakening	Mr. Moffat	
1958	Fiend Without a Face	Col. Butler	

=== Television ===
Year	Show	Role	Notes
1952-56	BBC Sunday-Night Theatre	Various roles	5 episodes

== Stage credits ==
Year	Title	Theatre	Role	Ref(s)
1947	Born Yesterday	Garrick Theatre	Ed Deverey	
1949	The Way Back	Westminster Theatre	Doctor	
