= In the Fen Country =

Tone poem by Ralph Vaughan Williams

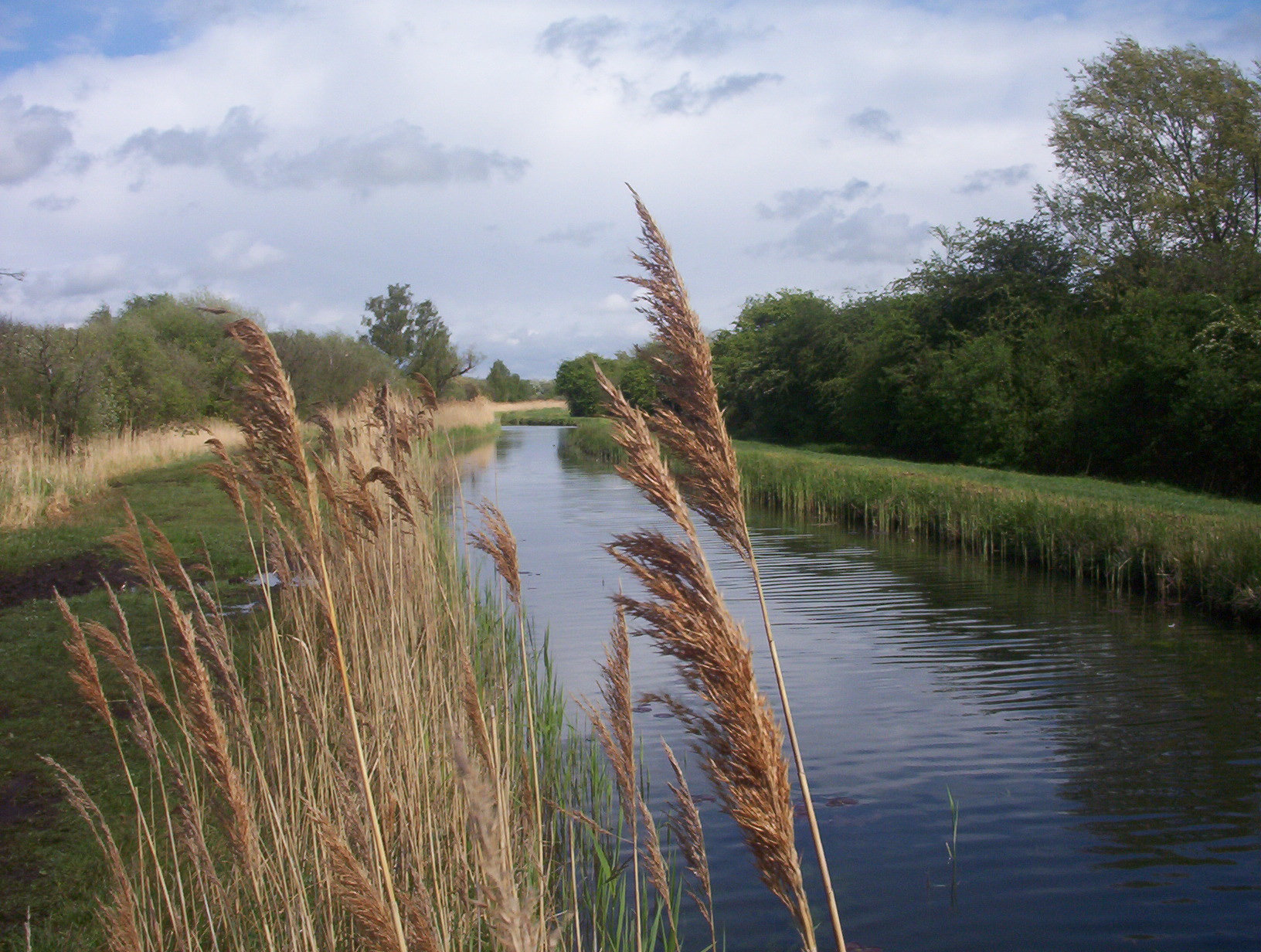
Wicken Fen

In the Fen Country is an orchestral tone poem written by the English composer Ralph Vaughan Williams. Described by Vaughan Williams as a "symphonic impression", he had completed the first version of the work in April 1904. He subsequently revised the work in 1905 and 1907 and it received its premiere at the Queen’s Hall under the conductor Thomas Beecham on 22 February 1909. The composer revised the orchestration in 1935 and it was Vaughan Williams' earliest composition not to be withdrawn.

During his studies at Trinity College, Cambridge from 1892 to 1895, the composer had explored the Cambridgeshire countryside with his cousin Ralph Wedgwood, the dedicatee of the work. He regularly travelled north through the Fens to hear choral services at Ely Cathedral. Vaughan Williams' second wife Ursula wrote that the composer recalled "One winter, the frosts were so hard that it was possible to skate from Cambridge to Ely".

The piece is meant to evoke feelings of traversing East Anglia's often bleak Fen landscape, illustrated by the solo cor anglais opening melody, then wide open spaces as portrayed by sweeping string orchestral textures, with a melodic language strongly reminiscent of English folksong, and a harmonic language closely aligned with that of Frederick Delius in his idyllic idiom.

Whilst various 1920 reports indicated that the score was lost at that time, with one saying "perhaps irretrievably" and another "temporarily lost", Alain Frogley commented in 1991 that the manuscript score is in the British Library. In the Fen Country received its first publication from Oxford University Press, posthumously, in 1969.
