= Park Street riot =

Racial conflict between American soldiers in Bristol, England

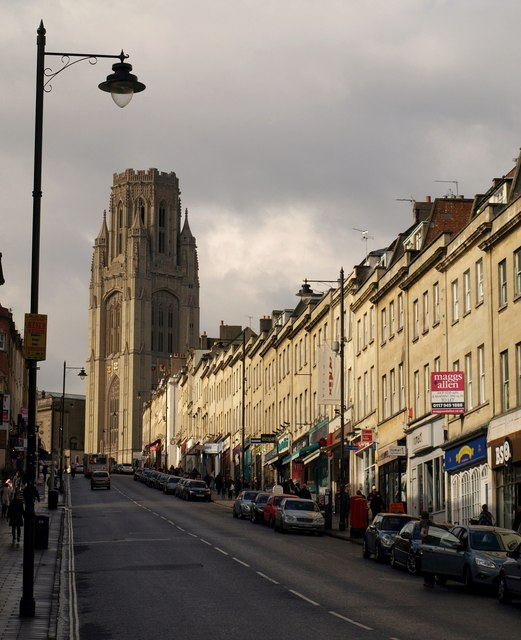
- Park Street, where the riot started
- Date: 15 July 1944
- Location: Park Street, Bristol, United Kingdom; 51.4569°N 2.6058°W
- Caused by: Racial tensions

Parties
US Military Police	Black US servicemen from segregated labour companies

Casualties
- Death: 1
- Injuries: Several
- Location of park Street Park Street riot (the United Kingdom)

The Park Street riot occurred in Park Street and George Street Bristol, England, on 15 July 1944 when many black US servicemen (GIs) refused to return to their camps after US military policemen (MPs) arrived to end a minor fracas. More MPs were sent, up to 120 in total, and Park Street was closed with buses. In subsequent confrontations an MP was stabbed, a black GI was shot dead, and several others were wounded.

== Background ==
During World War II, African-Americans formed 10 per cent of US Army servicemen in Britain, a total of about 150,000 in 1944. Most were in labour companies, engineers, stevedores and transport units. Many were based in the Bristol area because of the docks there. They had their barracks in Bedminster, Brislington, Henleaze, Shirehampton and the Muller Orphanage at Ashley Down.

The US Armed Forces were still racially segregated, and the soldiers of the labour companies were almost entirely black, while most of their officers were white, as were the MPs. Military commanders tended to treat these service units as "dumping grounds" for less competent officers, and leadership in the labour companies was poor.

Racial discrimination was codified by law in the United Kingdom and in some ways more restrictive than that of the U.S. (Note: The officer core was limited to white Europeans only.) However while racial segregation was both legal and commonly practiced, in contrast to the U.S., it was not mandated by the state, nor implemented at public or state run facilities, including British military bases.

The British government did not approve of American style segregation but resolved not to interfere in the treatment of African-Americans enlisted in the US Army. However UK authorities refused to organise segregated facilities or enforce segregation in non-US Army facilities. In response the US Army administration encouraged separate days during the week for black and white troops to have leave passes. The US military actively developed a policy that involved the segregation of many facilities in Britain. Two separate Red Cross centres existed in Bristol: St George Street for coloured GIs; and Berkeley Square for whites.

=== Earlier incidents ===
There were frequent clashes between black and white GIs.

Fist fights almost always broke out when black and white GIs were drinking in the same pub. There were some shootings, most by whites against blacks. (Major General Ira Eaker, commander of the Eighth Air Force, declared that white troops were responsible for 90 per cent of the trouble), and a few killings — all covered up by the army.

A US survey of soldiers' mail during the war revealed that white troops were particularly indignant about the public association of white women with black soldiers, which was unremarkable in Britain.

In June 1943 a significant racial incident, the Battle of Bamber Bridge, led to one death, 7 wounded and 32 court martialled; this followed the riots in Detroit earlier that week. In September 1943 at Launceston in Cornwall there was another armed confrontation between black GIs and MPs which left two MPs wounded; 14 black GIs were court martialled.

The days before the Park Street Riot saw an increase in tension between the black and white GIs. On 10 July at the Muller Orphanage, where some of the black troops were billeted, several white paratroopers arrived. The black soldiers claimed that they were insulted and then beaten by the paratroopers.

=== 545th Port Company mutiny ===
On the night of 12–13 July the 545th Port Company, an all-black segregated unit that was billeted at Sea Mills, mutinied. On the morning of 13 July the company refused direct orders to report for duty and remained in the barracks. They demanded better treatment from their officers, better accommodation for the soldiers in the guardhouse, and a halt to the paratroopers chasing black GIs through the streets of Bristol. The mutiny ended the same evening, without violence. One black soldier, Robert Davis of 542nd Port Company was accused of inciting the mutiny, and was court martialled on 6 September 1944 in Newport. He was sentenced to hard labour for life.

== Riot ==
On the evening of Saturday 15 July approximately 400 black GIs gathered in the area of Park Street. Some of them were accompanied by British women and a US military policeman stopped them. This caused a minor disturbance which prompted the deployment of more policemen. In total 120 armed military policemen attended. The black soldiers were gathered to march back to the trucks that were to drive them to their barracks. The MPs tried to disarm some of them who had knives. The black soldiers refused to hand them over, their colleagues intervened and in the resulting confrontation one policeman was stabbed and his attacker shot dead. The MPs restored control by closing off the street with buses and shooting several GIs in the legs. Many black GIs were arrested and several were sent to the local hospital. A curfew was established in Bristol for many days afterwards.

== See also ==
- Urban riots
