= Guy Byam =

British journalist and sailor

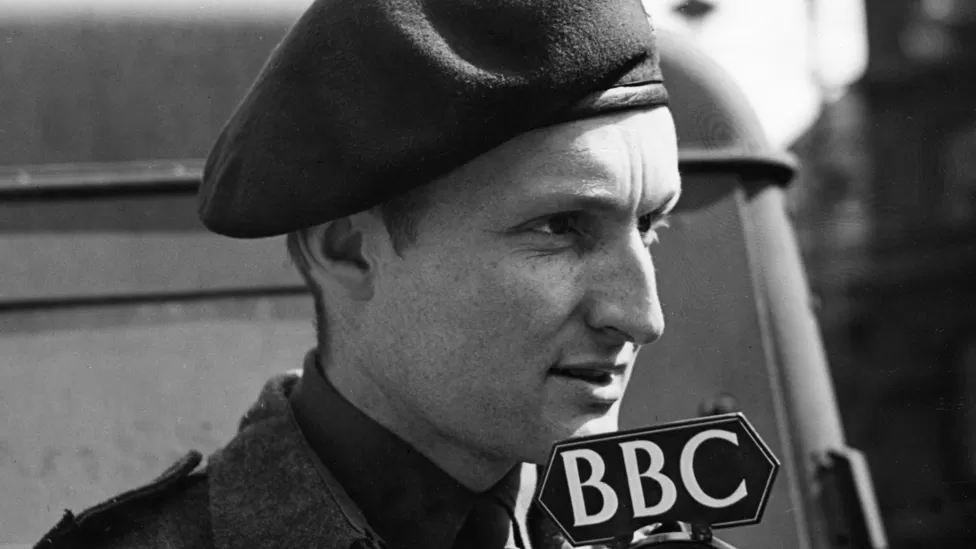
- Born: 28 July 1918; Newport Pagnell
- Died: 3 February 1945
- Cause of death: Aircraft lost in battle
- Occupation: Radio journalist
- Employer: BBC
- Guy Byam's voice Byam describes his parachute drop into occupied Europe, on D-Day. Recorded in June 1944

Guy Frederick Byam-Corstiaens (1918 - 3 February 1945) was a British journalist and sailor.

Byam served in the Royal Naval Volunteer Reserve and was one of only 68 survivors of the 254 crew of HMS Jervis Bay which was sunk in November 1940 in the North Atlantic. Byam lost the sight in his right eye in the incident, having swum through oil to be rescued.

Due to his injuries Byam was released from his duties and worked for an engineering company before joining the BBC in November 1942 as a sub-editor in their French Service. In April 1944 Byam joined the BBC's War Reporting Unit which covered Operation Overlord. On D-Day Byam jumped with paratroopers into occupied France. Byam was later part of the Public Relations team under Major R. W. Oliver that was present at the Battle of Arnhem alongside fellow BBC reporter Stanley Maxted and newspaper reporters Alan Wood of the Daily Express and Jack Smyth of Reuters.

Byam was killed when the plane from which he was reporting, the Rose of York, was shot down over Germany during a daylight air raid on Berlin in February 1945. Byam was one of two BBC reporters who were killed during the Second World War (the other being Kent Stevenson, who was also killed whilst reporting on a bombing raid).
