= 1944 in the United Kingdom =

Events from the year 1944 in the United Kingdom. The year was dominated by the Second World War.

== Incumbents ==
- Monarch – George VI
- Prime Minister – Winston Churchill (Coalition)

== Events ==
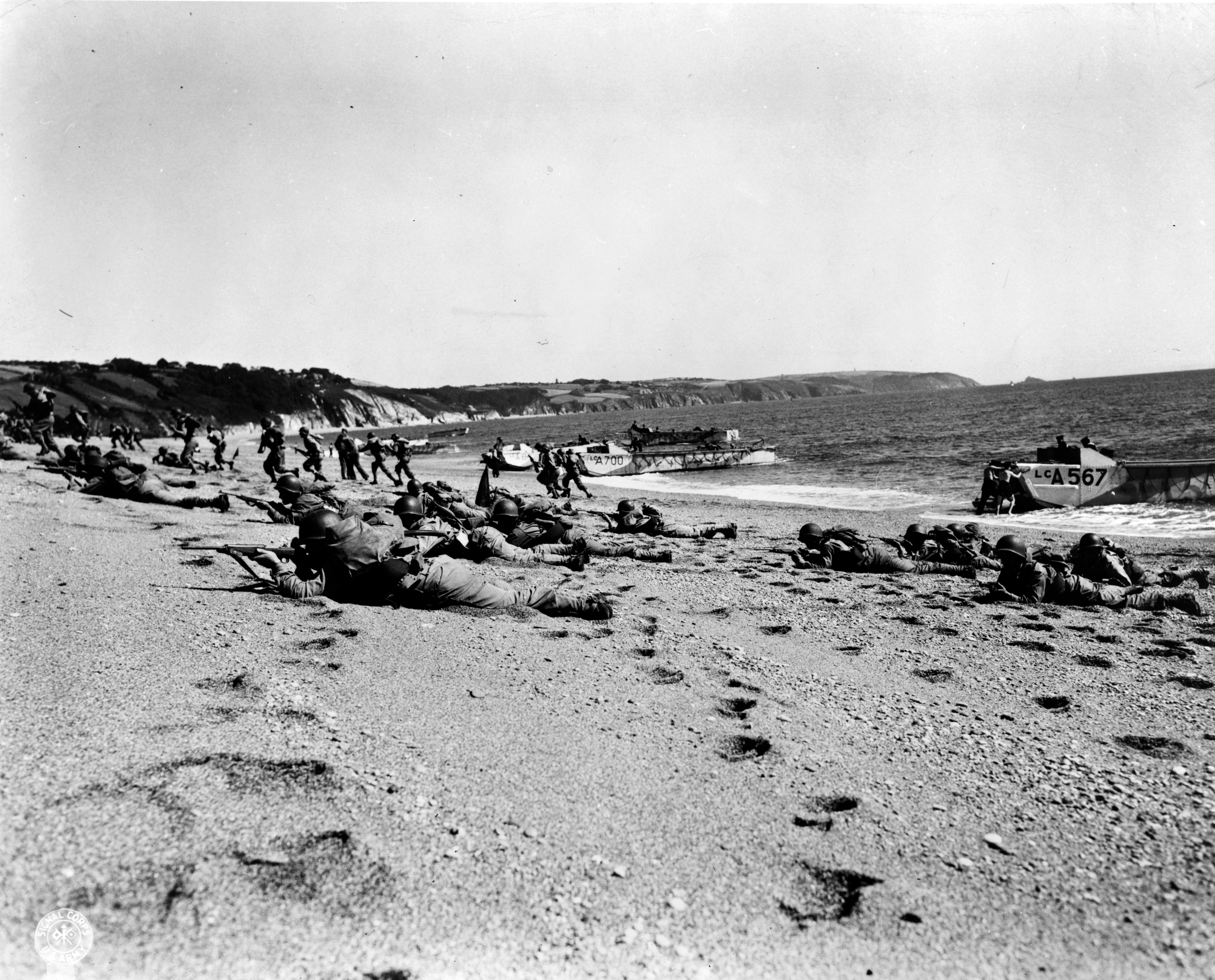
Exercise Tiger: U.S. Army troops land on the beach at Slapton, Devon during rehearsals for the Normandy landings

- January – Royal Air Force Mountain Rescue Service officially formed.
- 21–22 January – World War II: start of Operation Steinbock (the "Baby Blitz"), a nocturnal Luftwaffe bombing offensive chiefly targeted at the Greater London area (continues until May). On the first attack, few aircraft reach the target area.
- 10 February – PAYE (pay as you earn) system of tax collection introduced.
- 20 February – World War II: destroyer HMS Warwick (1917) is torpedoed by German submarine U-413 off Trevose Head, Cornwall, sinking in 6 minutes with the loss of 66 men, over half her crew.
- 26 February – World War II: last heavy air-raids on London.
- February – government white paper A National Health Service published.
- 10 March – lifting of marriage bar on women working as teachers.
- 22 March – World War II: Moordown air disaster – a Royal Air Force Halifax bomber crashes soon after take-off from RAF Hurn at Bournemouth, killing all 7 crew and 2 civilians in their homes.
- 28 April – World War II: Allied convoy T4, forming part of amphibious Exercise Tiger (a full-scale rehearsal for the Normandy landings) in Start Bay off the Devon coast, is attacked by E-boats, resulting in the deaths of 749 American servicemen from LSTs.
- 3–8 May – World War II: Exercise Fabius, the last major Allied rehearsals for the Normandy landings, take place along the south coast of England.
- 29 May – thunderstorms lead to severe flooding, particularly around Holmfirth.
- 5 June – World War II: final preparations for the Normandy landings take place in the south of England. Group Captain James Stagg correctly forecasts a brief improvement in weather conditions over the English Channel which will permit the following day's landings to take place (having been deferred from today due to unfavourable weather). The BBC transmits coded messages (including the second line of a poem by Paul Verlaine) to underground resistance fighters in France warning that the invasion of Europe is about to begin.

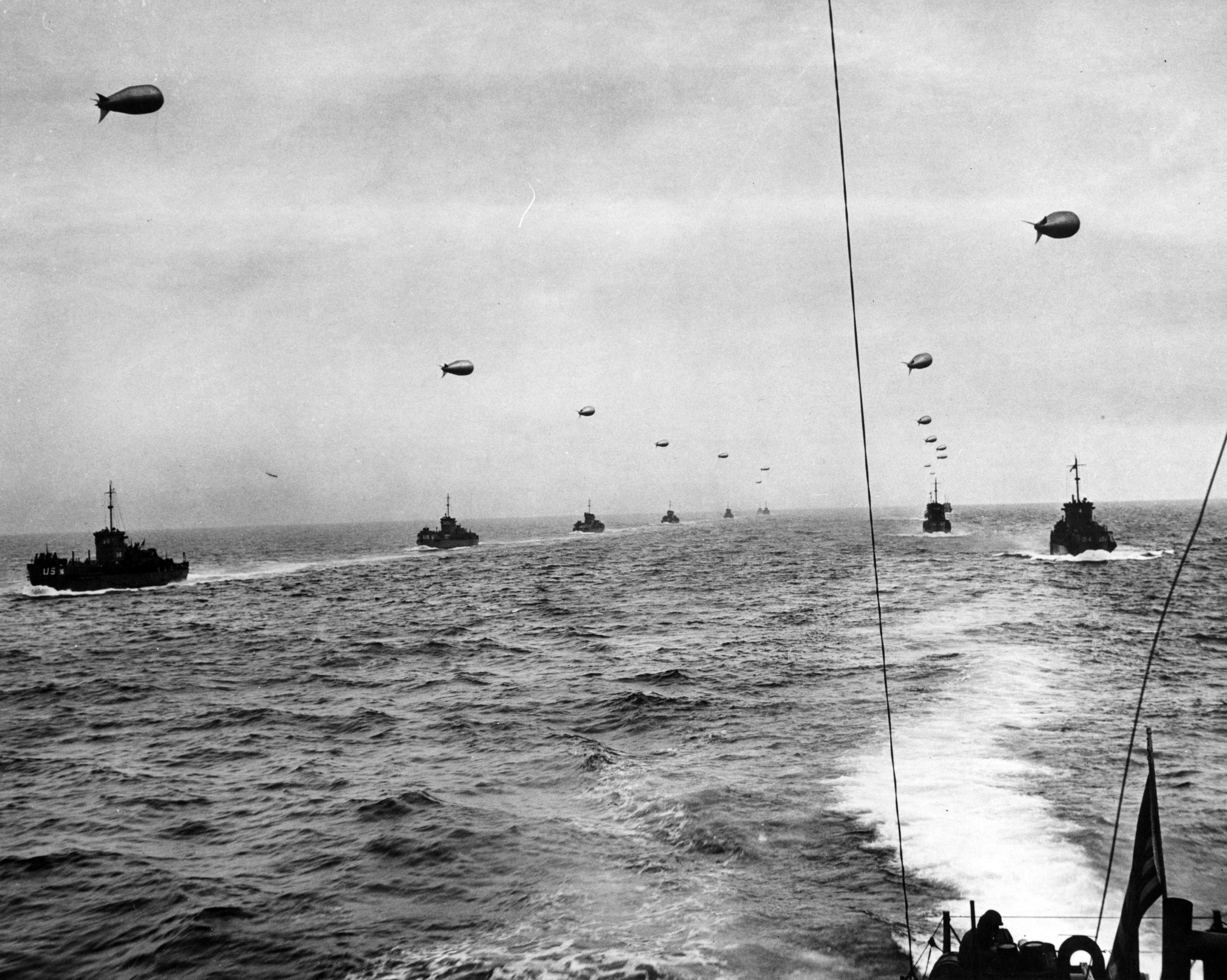
Normandy landings: Landing craft cross the English Channel

- 6 June – World War II: D-Day for the Normandy landings: 155,000 Allied troops land on the beaches of Normandy in France, beginning Operation Overlord and the Invasion of Normandy.
- 13 June – World War II: the first V-1 flying bomb attack on London takes place. Eight civilians are killed in the blast. The bomb earns the nickname "doodlebug".
- 15 July – World War II: Park Street riot in Bristol, a confrontation between black G.I.s and U.S. Military Police.
- 21 July – World War II: German submarine U-212 is depth-charged and sunk off Brighton on the south coast by British warships.
- Summer
  - Ministry of Works builds the first demonstration temporary prefab houses designed for postwar reconstruction (in Northolt and on Millbank in London).
  - The 1944 Summer Olympics, scheduled for London, are not held due to World War II.
- 3 August – the Education Act, promoted by Rab Butler, provides for the postwar education system, including free secondary education for children of both sexes and raising of the school leaving age to 15. As generally implemented, although not mandated by the Act, this leads to a Tripartite System of secondary education in England and Wales with Secondary Modern, Technical (sometimes), and Grammar schools, entrance being determined in most cases by the results of the Eleven plus exam.
- 12 August – World War II: the V-1 flying bomb campaign against London by the Germans reaches its 60th day, with more than 6,000 deaths, 17,000 injuries and damage or destruction to around 1 million buildings.
- 20 August – American Liberty ship SS Richard Montgomery is wrecked off the Nore in the Thames Estuary with around 1,400 tonnes of explosives on board, never recovered.
- 21 August – Dumbarton Oaks Conference opens in Washington, D.C.: American, British, Chinese, French and Soviet representatives meet to plan the founding of the United Nations.
- 23 August – Freckleton air disaster: A USAAF Consolidated B-24 Liberator heavy bomber crashes into the village school at Freckleton, Lancashire, in a storm with 58 ground fatalities and 3 aircrew killed.
- 7 September – the Belgian government leaves the UK and returns to Belgium following the liberation of Brussels on 3 September (by the Guards Armoured Division).
- 8 September – World War II: the first V-2 rocket attack on London (launched from The Hague) takes place, striking in the Chiswick district of the city and resulting in the deaths of three people.
- 15 September – a fatal explosion at ROF Kirkby in Lancashire (the second this year) kills 14 workers who were engaged on filling munitions.
- 17 September – World War II: restrictions imposed by the Blackout are relaxed.
- 19 September – World War II: the UK is a co-signatory with the Soviet Union of the Moscow Armistice, ending the latter's Continuation War with Finland.
- 25 September – World War II: V-2 rockets aimed at Ipswich and Norwich by the Germans miss their targets by a distance.
- 9 October – fourth Moscow Conference: Prime Minister Winston Churchill and Soviet Premier Joseph Stalin begin a nine-day conference in Moscow to discuss the future of Europe.
- 10 October – Housing (Temporary Accommodation) Act makes arrangements for postwar provision of adequate housing for all who need it.
- 23 October – the Allies recognise Charles de Gaulle's cabinet as the provisional government of France.
- November – Donald Watson and friends in Leicester establish The Vegan Society, pioneering and naming the modern vegan movement.
- 12 November – World War II: sinking of the German battleship Tirpitz at her anchorage off Norway by RAF Avro Lancaster bombers.
- 22 November – release of Laurence Olivier's Henry V, the first work of Shakespeare filmed in colour.
- 25 November – World War II: a V-2 rocket destroys the Woolworths store in New Cross Road, south east London, killing 168, the highest death toll from one of these weapons. More than 100 people survive with injuries.
- 27 November – RAF Fauld explosion: between 3,450 and 3,930 tons (3,500 and 4,000 tonnes) of ordnance explodes at an underground storage depot in Staffordshire leaving about 75 dead and a crater 1,200 metres (0.75 miles) across and 120 metres (400 ft) deep, one of the largest explosions in history and the largest on UK soil.

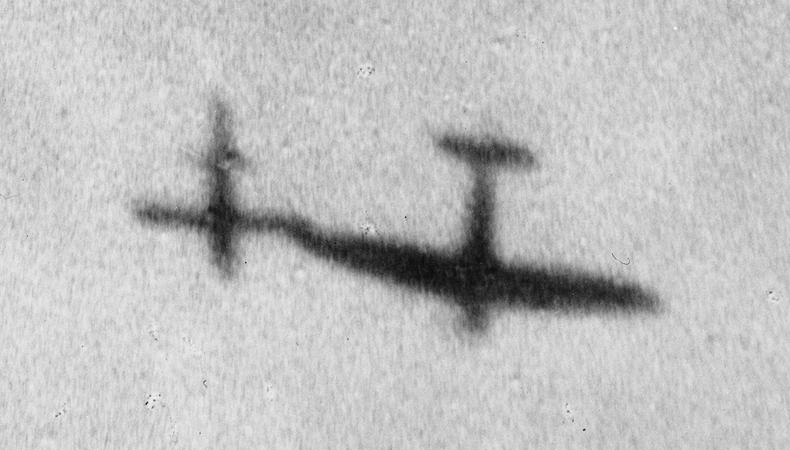
A Spitfire using its wingtip to "topple" a V-1 flying bomb

- 3 December – World War II: the Home Guard is stood down.
- 19 December – Council of Industrial Design established.
- 24 December – World War II: fifty German V-1 flying bombs, air-launched from Heinkel He 111 bombers flying over the North Sea, target Manchester, killing at least 27 and injuring more than 100 in the Oldham area.

== Publications ==
- H. E. Bates' novel Fair Stood the Wind for France.
- Joyce Cary's novel The Horse's Mouth.
- Agatha Christie's novels Towards Zero and Death Comes as the End.
- L. P. Hartley's novel The Shrimp and the Anemone, first in the Eustace and Hilda trilogy.
- F. W. Hayek's economic text The Road to Serfdom.
- C. S. Lewis's theological dream vision The Great Divorce (serial publication begins).
- W. Somerset Maugham's novel The Razor's Edge.
- L. T. C. Rolt's travelogue Narrow Boat.
- G. M. Trevelyan's book English Social History: a survey of six centuries from Chaucer to Queen Victoria.

== Births ==
=== January – June ===
- 4 January – Angela Harris, Baroness Harris of Richmond, politician
- 9 January – Jimmy Page, guitarist (Led Zeppelin)
- 27 January
  - Mairead Corrigan, Northern Irish activist, recipient of the Nobel Peace Prize
  - Nick Mason, English drummer (Pink Floyd)
- 28 January – John Tavener, English composer of religious music (died 2013)
- 2 February
  - Andrew Davis, English conductor (died 2024)
  - Geoffrey Hughes, English actor (died 2012)
- 3 February – Virginia Ironside, journalist and agony aunt
- 8 February
  - Roger Lloyd-Pack, English actor (died 2014)
  - Tony Minson, virologist and academic
- 10 February – Clifford T. Ward, English singer-songwriter (died 2001)
- 13 February – Jerry Springer, English-born television host (died 2023 in the United States)
- 14 February – Alan Parker, English film director (died 2020)
- 17 February – Karl Jenkins, Welsh composer
- 22 February – Christopher Meyer, diplomat (died 2022 in France)
- 23 February – Bernard Cornwell, historical novelist
- 24 February – Nicky Hopkins, English rock keyboardist (died 1994 in the United States)
- 27 February – Roger Scruton, English philosopher (died 2020)
- 1 March – Roger Daltrey, English rock singer (The Who)
- 4 March – Harvey Postlethwaite, engineer and racecar designer (died 1999)
- 7 March – Ranulph Fiennes, English adventurer
- 17 March – John Lill, pianist
- 18 March – Nicholas Snowman, arts administrator and jeweller (died 2023)
- 21 March – Mike Jackson, British Army officer (died 2024)
- 23 March – Michael Nyman, composer
- 24 March – Steve Jones, geneticist
- 31 March
  - Mick Ralphs, guitarist and singer/songwriter (died 2025)
  - Malcolm Roberts, singer (died 2003)
- 3 April
  - Derek Higgs, English banker and businessman (died 2008)
  - Anna Raeburn, writer and broadcaster
- 4 April – Phyllida Barlow, sculptor (died 2023)
- 6 April – Felicity Palmer, English soprano
- 12 April – Lisa Jardine, historian and polymath (died 2015)
- 13 April – Brian Pendleton, guitarist (died 2001)
- 16 April – Sue Clifford, environmentalist and academic, co-founder of Common Ground
- 23 April – Timothy Garden, Baron Garden, RAF pilot and politician (died 2007)
- 25 April – Len Goodman, ballroom dancer and television personality (died 2023)
- 26 April – Richard Bradshaw, orchestral conductor (died 2007)
- 27 April – Michael Fish, television weatherman
- 29 April
  - Michael Angelis, actor (died 2020)
  - Francis Lee, English footballer (died 2023)
- 5 May
  - Roger Rees, Welsh actor (died 2015)
  - John Rhys-Davies, Welsh actor
- 6 May – Mike Coulman, dual-code rugby international (died 2023)
- 8 May
  - Gary Glitter, English singer and convicted sex offender
  - David Vaughan, psychedelic artist (died 2003)
- 12 May
  - Sara Kestelman, actress
  - Chris Patten, politician
- 20 May – Joe Cocker, English singer (died 2014)
- 22 May – Lynn Barber, journalist
- 25 May – Frank Oz, English puppeteer and film director
- 28 May – Patricia Quinn, Northern Irish actress
- 31 May – Diane Langton, actress, singer and dancer (died 2025)
- 24 June
  - Jeff Beck, rock guitarist (died 2023)
  - John "Charlie" Whitney, rock guitarist (Family)
- 1 June
  - Colin Blakemore, neurobiologist (died 2022)
  - Robert Powell, actor
- 3 June – Peter Bonfield, businessman
- 6 June
  - Reuven Bulka, rabbi, writer, broadcaster and activist (died 2021)
  - David Penhaligon, politician (died 1986)
- 11 June – Alan Howarth, Baron Howarth of Newport, English politician, Minister for Culture, Communications and Creative Industries

=== July – December ===
- 2 July – Billy Campbell, Northern Irish footballer
- 7 July
  - Glenys Kinnock, politician (died 2023)
  - Ian Wilmut, embryologist (died 2023)
- 11 July – Peter de Savary, entrepreneur (died 2022)
- 12 July – Terry Cooper, English footballer (died 2021)
- 21 July – Tony Scott, English film director (died 2012)
- 22 July – Rick Davies, English musician (died 2025)
- 27 July
  - Tony Capstick, English comedian, actor and musician (died 2003)
  - Matthew Robinson, English television and film producer, director and writer
- 31 July
  - Jonathan Dimbleby, broadcaster and writer
  - Tommy Robson, English footballer (Northampton Town, Chelsea, Newcastle United, Peterborough United) (died 2020)
- 2 August – Jim Capaldi, drummer and singer-songwriter (Traffic) (died 2005)
- 9 August – John Simpson, journalist and broadcaster
- 11 August – Ian McDiarmid, Scottish actor
- 15 August – R. A. W. Rhodes, political scientist and academic
- 17 August – Bobby Murdoch, footballer and football manager (died 2001)
- 20 August – Brian Barnes, artist (died 2021)
- 26 August – Prince Richard, Duke of Gloucester, member of the British royal family
- 28 August
  - Ray Lowry, cartoonist (died 2008)
  - Kay Parker, actress (died 2022)
- 30 August – John Surman, saxophonist
- 31 August – Roger Dean, English graphic artist
- 4 September
  - Tony Atkinson, economist (died 2017)
  - Dave Bassett, football manager
- 8 September – Margaret Hodge, politician
- 10 September – Thomas Allen, opera singer
- 13 September – Jacqueline Bisset, English film actress
- 15 September – Graham Taylor, English footballer and manager (died 2017)
- 18 September – Veronica Carlson, English film actress (died 2022)
- 20 September
  - Jeremy Child, English actor
  - Paul Madeley, English footballer (died 2018)
- 22 September – Frazer Hines, screen actor
- 26 September – Anne Robinson, television host
- 27 September – Ian Garnett, admiral
- 30 September – Jimmy Johnstone, Scottish footballer
- 9 October – John Entwistle, English rock bassist (The Who) (died 2002)
- 10 October – Eurig Wyn, Welsh politician
- 12 October – Angela Rippon, broadcaster and newsreader
- 15 October – David Trimble, Northern Irish politician, recipient of the Nobel Peace Prize (died 2022)
- 21 October – Janet Ahlberg, children's book writer (died 1994)
- 23 October – Mike Harding, comedian and musician
- 28 October – Ian Marter, television actor and writer (died 1986)
- 10 November – Tim Rice, lyricist, writer and broadcaster
- 14 November – Karen Armstrong, writer
- 25 November – Sylvia Gore, footballer (died 2016)
- 3 December – Ralph McTell, singer-songwriter
- 6 December – Jonathan King, music producer and convicted sex offender
- 9 December
  - Neil Innes, English comedian and musician (died 2019)
  - Roger Short, diplomat (murdered in the 2003 Istanbul bombings)
- 12 December – Kenneth Cranham, actor
- 14 December – Denis Thwaites, English footballer (murdered in the 2015 Sousse attacks)
- 15 December – Duncan Campbell, investigative journalist (died 2025)
- 16 December – Tony Martin, farmer convicted of shooting a burglar (died 2025)
- 17 December
  - Bernard Hill, actor (died 2024)
  - Humphrey Smith, brewer (died 2026)
- 19 December
  - Fred Callaghan, English footballer (died 2022)
  - Alvin Lee, guitarist and singer-songwriter (died 2013)
- 20 December – Anton Rippon, journalist and author
- 21 December – Bill Atkinson, English footballer (died 2013)
- 22 December – Mary Archer, scientist
- 24 December – Mick Shoebottom, rugby league player (died 2002)
- 25 December – Kenny Everett, comedian (died 1995)
- 26 December – Jane Lapotaire, actress (died 2026)
- 27 December – Mick Jones, English rock guitarist, singer-songwriter and producer (Foreigner)

== Deaths ==
- 1 January – Sir Edwin Lutyens, architect (born 1869)
- 19 January – Emily Winifred Dickson, gynaecologist (born 1866 in Ireland)
- 9 February – Agnes Mary Frances Duclaux, poet, biographer and novelist (born 1857)
- 12 February
  - Olive Custance, Lady Alfred Douglas, poet (born 1874)
  - Kenneth Gandar-Dower, sportsman, aviator, explorer and author, torpedoed (born 1908)
- 2 March – Ida Maclean, biochemist, first woman admitted to the Chemical Society of London (born 1877)
- 5 March – Alun Lewis, war poet (born 1915)
- 24 March – Orde Wingate, soldier, in aviation accident in India (born 1903)
- 19 March – Mary Paley Marshall, economist (born 1850)
- 2 April – John Batchelor, missionary (born 1855)
- 13 April – Hugh Lowther, 5th Earl of Lonsdale, sportsman, donor of the Lonsdale Belt in boxing (born 1857)
- 16 April – William Percival Crozier, editor of The Manchester Guardian (born 1879)
- 17 April – J. T. Hearne, cricketer (born 1867)
- 8 May – Dame Ethel Smyth, composer and suffragette (born 1858)
- 12 May
  - Harold Lowe, sailor, 5th officer of RMS Titanic (born 1882)
  - Sir Arthur Quiller-Couch ('Q'), writer (born 1863)
- 9 June – Keith Douglas, war poet, killed in action (born 1920)
- 6 July
  - Vera Leigh, SOE agent, executed in France (born 1903)
  - Diana Rowden, SOE agent, executed in France (born 1915)
- 18 July
  - Thomas Sturge Moore, poet, author and artist (born 1870)
  - Rex Whistler, painter, killed in action (born 1905)
- 28 July – Ralph H. Fowler, astronomer and physicist (born 1889)
- 12 August – Joseph P. Kennedy Jr., US military aviator, on active service over England (born 1915 in the United States)
- 13 August – Ethel Lina White, crime novelist (born 1876)
- 19 August – Sir Henry Wood, orchestral conductor (born 1869)
- 13 September
  - Noor Inayat Khan, SOE agent, executed in Germany (born 1914 in Russia)
  - Eliane Plewman, SOE agent, executed in Germany (born 1917 in France)
  - W. Heath Robinson, cartoonist and illustrator (born 1872)
- 19 September – Guy Gibson VC, Wing Commander, on active service over the Netherlands (born 1918 in British India)
- 25 September – Sir Leo Chiozza Money, economist and politician (born 1870 in Italy)
- 27 September – David Dougal Williams, painter (born 1888)
- 23 October – Charles Glover Barkla, physicist, Nobel Prize laureate (born 1877)
- 26 October
  - The Princess Beatrice, last surviving child of Queen Victoria (born 1857)
  - William Temple, Archbishop of Canterbury (born 1881)
- 31 October – Joseph Hubert Priestley, botanist (born 1883)
- 4 November – Sir John Dill, Field Marshal (born 1881)
- 7 November – Geoffrey Dawson, newspaper editor (born 1874)
- 14 November – Sir Trafford Leigh-Mallory, Air Chief Marshal, in aviation accident in France (born 1892)
- 22 November
  - Sir George Clausen, painter (born 1852)
  - Sir Arthur Eddington, astrophysicist (born 1882)
- 27 November – Jill Furse, actress (born 1915)
- 30 November – Roy Emerton, actor (born 1893)
- 26 December – George Bellamy, silent film actor (born 1866)

== See also ==
- List of British films of 1944
- Military history of the United Kingdom during World War II
