= Luciano De Ambrosis =

Italian actor and voice actor (born 1937)

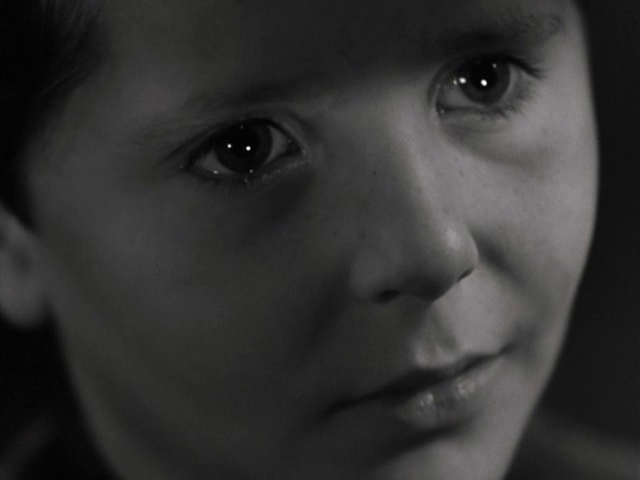
- De Ambrosis in The Children Are Watching Us (1943)
- Born: 28 March 1937 (age 88); Turin, Italy
- Occupations: Actor; voice actor; dubbing director
- Years active: 1942–present
- Children: Massimo De Ambrosis

Luciano De Ambrosis (born 28 March 1937) is an Italian actor and voice actor.

== Biography ==
De Ambrosis was born in Turin, the youngest of four siblings. His father worked for the Italian automobile manufacturer Fiat. He made his film debut at only five years old, playing the lead role in Vittorio De Sica's acclaimed film The Children Are Watching Us. He went on to play the protagonist in many other films through the next six years.

He acted infrequently on-camera afterwards but maintains a successful career as voice actor. He is the regular dubbing voice for Burt Reynolds, James Caan and Dennis Farina. He also dubs Albert Finney, Jon Voight, Seymour Cassel, John Mahoney, Nick Nolte, Frank Langella, Brian Cox and since 1994, he voiced Sean Connery in most of his films after the death of Pino Locchi. His son Massimo De Ambrosis is also a voice actor.

He lives and works in Rome.

== Filmography ==
=== Cinema ===
- The Children Are Watching Us (1943)
- L'angelo del miracolo (1945)
- Casello N. 3 (1945)
- La vita semplice (1946)
- Senza famiglia (1946)
- Ritorno al nido (1946)
- Heart and Soul (1948)
- Tomorrow Is Too Late (1950)
- VIP my Brother Superman (1968) - voice
- The Case Is Closed, Forget It (1971) - voice, uncredited
- L'Aretino nei suoi ragionamenti sulle cortigiane, le maritate e... i cornuti contenti (1972)
- Torso (1973)
- They Were Called Three Musketeers But They Were Four (1973) - voice, uncredited

== Dubbing roles ==
=== Animation ===
- The King in Arthur and the Invisibles
- The King in Arthur and the Revenge of Maltazard
- The Toad in Flushed Away
- Rama in The Jungle Book
- King Dymas in Sinbad: Legend of the Seven Seas
- Cera’s father in The Land Before Time
- Fred's father in Big Hero 6
- Bigwig in Watership Down
- Mr. Pricklepants in Toy Story 4
- King Jihl in Nausicaä of the Valley of the Wind

=== Live action ===
- Jonathan E. in Rollerball
- Mike Locken in The Killer Elite
- Tommy Korman in Honeymoon in Vegas
- Frank Colton in Bulletproof
- Paul Sheldon in Misery
- Walter Hobbs in Elf
- Frank Athearn in Comes a Horseman
- Robert DeGuerin in Eraser
- Spud Spaldoni in Dick Tracy
- Freebie in Freebie and the Bean
- Eddie Dohun in A Bridge Too Far
- Bankie Como in Men of Respect
- Clell Hazard in Gardens of Stone
- President of the United States in Get Smart
- Bo Darville in Smokey and the Bandit
- Coach Nate Scarborough in The Longest Yard
- Ernie Mullins in Breaking In
- Walker in Lucky Lady
- David Fowler in The Man Who Loved Women
- Walter Burns in Mystery, Alaska
- Jack Horner in Boogie Nights
- John L. Sullivan IV in Switching Channels
- Joey Pistella in The Crew
- King Konreid in In the Name of the King
- Martin Crane in Frasier (seasons 1-5)
- Perry White in Superman
- Perry White in Superman II
- Perry White in Superman III
- King Arthur in First Knight
- Robert "Mac" MacDougal in Entrapment
- Paul in Playing by Heart
- William Forrester in Finding Forrester
- King Richard in Robin Hood: Prince of Thieves
