= The Children Are Watching Us =

- Film poster
- Directed by: Vittorio De Sica
- Screenplay by: Vittorio De Sica; Cesare Zavattini; Cesare Giulio Viola; Margherita Maglione; Adolfo Franci; Gherardo Gherardi
- Based on: Pricò; 1924 novel by Cesare Giulio Viola
- Produced by: Franco Magli
- Starring: Emilio Cigoli; Luciano De Ambrosis; Isa Pola
- Cinematography: Giuseppe Caracciolo; Romolo Garroni
- Edited by: Mario Bonotti
- Music by: Renzo Rossellini
- Distributed by: Scalera Film S.p.a.
- Release date: 1944
- Running time: 85 minutes
- Country: Italy
- Language: Italian

The Children Are Watching Us (Italian: I bambini ci guardano) is a 1944 Italian drama film directed by Vittorio De Sica.

== Plot ==
Pricò is a young Italian boy who lives with his parents in a middle-class household. His mother, Nina, takes him to a local park where he enjoys his time out while watching a puppet show. However, he is concerned about a handsome man named Roberto (with whom Nina has shared a past romance) courting his mother while they assume he is not paying attention. When they return home, the family has dinner while Pricò reflects on his day in the park. Later that night, after his mother puts him to bed, she runs off with the stranger, leaving Pricò's father distressed at the idea of having to raise his son by himself. While their neighbors share a number of rumors concerning the disappearance of Nina, it is quickly agreed that she ran off with another man. Nina returns to the home after a few days for the sake of their son. While the father, Andrea, is not entirely pleased with this arrangement, he relents so that his son may grow up in the same house as his mother.

To distance herself from Roberto, Nina and Andrea agree to go on vacation with their son to a nearby beach hotel. The vacation occupies their time, and they are seemingly happy with the prospect of a reunion. After Andrea says that he must go back home to his job, he suggests that Nina stays on with Pricò a few extra days. After he leaves, Nina is again pursued by Roberto, who shows up unexpectedly at a hotel dance. At first she successfully keeps him away, but after she yields to him once again, Pricò is dismayed by her lack of faith. Pricò runs away, but is eventually brought back by police officers.

Pricò and his mother return to their home town. Nina tells him outside their home to go on up and that she'll be up after going on an errand. When Pricò goes to see his father upstairs, he and his father realize the truth of why Nina is not there. Again distressed at the departure of his wife, Andrea enrolls Pricò in a boarding school. While his son is away, Andrea kills himself in despair. When Pricò is told of the death at the school, both his mother and her faithful maid are there to comfort him. Though very young, Pricò understands the nature of his mother, refusing to go to her for comfort in favor of the maid. The film ends with Pricò walking off, refusing to acknowledge his mother.

== Cast ==
- Emilio Cigoli - Andrea - il padre
- Giovanna Cigoli - Agnese - la governante
- Olinto Cristina - Il rettore - The Chancellor
- Luciano De Ambrosis - Pricò
- Jone Frigerio - La nonna (as Ione Frigerio)
- Mario Gallina - Il medico
- Maria Gardena - La signora Uberti
- Zaira La Fratta - Paolina
- Armando Migliari - Il commendatore
- Guido Morisi - Gigi Sbarlani
- Nicoletta Parodi - Giuliana
- Dina Perbellini - Zia Berelli
- Isa Pola - Nina - la madre
- Adriano Rimoldi - Roberto - l'amante di Nina
- Tecla Scarano - La signora Resta (Mrs. Resta)
