= Chick Henderson (singer) =

British singer

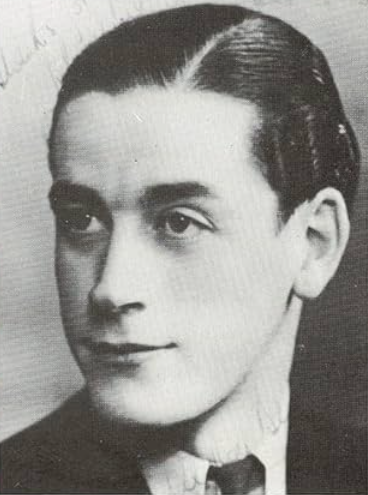
Chick Henderson in 1938

Chick Henderson (22 November 1912 – 24 June 1944) was an English singer who achieved great popularity and acclaim as a prolific recording artist and performer at the tail end of the British dance band era in the late 1930s and early 1940s.

Chick Henderson was born Henderson Rowntree in Hartlepool, England. He attended Galleys Field School on Hartlepool Headland. "Chick" was nothing more than his mother's nickname for her smallest son. His first recordings were made for Harry Leader in June 1935. The following year he began singing for Joe Loss' popular radio orchestra. He stayed with Loss for five years and became a great favourite among young women who formed his core audience. A tall, handsome man with a rich, strong vocal delivery, he appeared on postcards and magazine covers.

In his short life, Chick Henderson made over 250 recordings but, as with many dance band singers, his name did not appear on the record label;only the orchestra was listed. In July 1939, he recorded with Joe Loss' orchestra what would become his biggest-selling recording "Begin the Beguine", which sold over a million copies, the only recording by a British dance band vocalist to achieve such a triumph.

Chick Henderson's five-year singing career came to an end with his final recordings in 1940. Less than a year following the start of World War II in September 1939, he began serving in the Merchant Navy. He survived two torpedo attacks on his ships, but after four years of service, sustained fatal wounds in Southsea from flying bomb shrapnel. Chick Henderson was 31 years old. A Sub-Lieutenant in the Royal Naval Volunteer Reserve, on strength of HMS Victory at time of his death, he was buried in Haslar Royal Naval Cemetery under his real name.
