= List of British films of 1927 =

A list of British films released in 1927.

== 1927 ==
| Title | Director | Cast | Genre | Notes |
|---|---|---|---|---|
1927
| The Arcadians | Victor Saville | Ben Blue, Jeanne De Casalis, John Longden | Comedy | |
| The Battles of Coronel and Falkland Islands | Walter Summers | | Documentary | World War I battle reconstruction |
| Blighty | Adrian Brunel | Ellaline Terriss, Lillian Hall-Davis, Jameson Thomas | Drama | |
| Carry On! | Dinah Shurey | Moore Marriott, Trilby Clark, Alf Goddard | Comedy | |
| Confetti | Graham Cutts | Jack Buchanan, Annette Benson, Robin Irvine | Drama | |
| Downhill | Alfred Hitchcock | Ivor Novello, Ian Hunter, Annette Benson | Drama | |
| The Fake | George Jacoby | Henry Edwards, Elga Brink, Juliette Compton | Drama | |
| The Flag Lieutenant | Maurice Elvey | Henry Edwards, Lilian Oldland, Dorothy Seacombe | War | |
| The Flight Commander | Maurice Elvey | Alan Cobham, Estelle Brody John Stuart | War | |
| The Further Adventures of the Flag Lieutenant | W. P. Kellino | Henry Edwards, Lilian Oldland, Isabel Jeans | Action | |
| Ghost Train | Géza von Bolváry | Guy Newall, Hilde Jennings, Louis Ralph | Comedy thriller | |
| The Glad Eye | Maurice Elvey | Estelle Brody, Mabel Poulton, John Stuart | Comedy | |
| Hindle Wakes | Maurice Elvey | Estelle Brody, John Stuart, Norman McKinnel | Drama | |
| Huntingtower | George Pearson | Harry Lauder | Romance/adventure | |
| The King's Highway | Sinclair Hill | John Carew, Gerald Ames | Romance/adventure | |
| Land of Hope and Glory | Harley Knoles | Ellaline Terriss, Lyn Harding | Drama | |
| The Little People | George Pearson | Betty Balfour, Frank Stanmore | Romance | |
| The Lodger: A Story of the London Fog | Alfred Hitchcock | Ivor Novello, Marie Ault, Malcolm Keen | Thriller | |
| The Luck of the Navy | Fred Paul | Evelyn Laye, Henry Victor | Action | |
| Madame Pompadour | Herbert Wilcox | Dorothy Gish, Antonio Moreno | Historical/drama | |
| Mademoiselle from Armentieres | Maurice Elvey | Estelle Brody, John Stuart | Drama | |
| The Marriage Business | Leslie S. Hiscott | Estelle Brody, Owen Nares | Comedy | |
| Motherland | G. B. Samuelson | Rex Davis, Eva Moore | War | |
| Motoring | George Dewhurst | Harry Tate, Roy Travers | Comedy | |
| The Mountain Eagle | Alfred Hitchcock | Nita Naldi, Bernhard Goetzke | Drama | |
| Mr. Nobody | Frank Miller | Frank Stanmore, Pauline Johnson | Drama | |
| Mumsie | Herbert Wilcox | Pauline Frederick, Nelson Keys | Drama | |
| My Lord the Chauffeur | B. E. Doxat-Pratt | Kim Peacock, Pauline Johnson, Sydney Fairbrother | Comedy | |
| One of the Best | T. Hayes Hunter | Carlyle Blackwell, Walter Byron | Crime | |
| The Only Way | Herbert Wilcox | John Martin Harvey, Madge Stuart | Drama | |
| Passion Island | Manning Haynes | Lilian Oldland, Moore Marriott | Drama | |
| Poppies of Flanders | Arthur Maude | Jameson Thomas, Eve Gray | Drama | |
| The Queen Was in the Parlour | Graham Cutts | Lili Damita, Louis Ralph | Drama | Co-production with Germany |
| Quinneys | Maurice Elvey | John Longden, Alma Taylor | Romance | |
| Remembrance | Bert Wynne | Rex Davis, Enid Stamp-Taylor | Drama | |
| The Ring | Alfred Hitchcock | Carl Brisson, Lillian Hall-Davis | Drama | |
| Robinson Crusoe | M. A. Wetherell | M.A. Wetherell, Fay Compton | Adventure | |
| The Rolling Road | Graham Cutts | Carlyle Blackwell, Flora le Breton | Drama | |
| Roses of Picardy | Maurice Elvey | Lillian Hall-Davis, John Stuart | War | |
| Second to None | Jack Raymond | Moore Marriott, Ian Fleming, Benita Hume | War | |
| Shooting Stars | Anthony Asquith | Annette Benson, Brian Aherne | Drama | |
| The Silver Lining | Thomas Bentley | Marie Ault, Patrick Aherne | Drama | |
| A Sister to Assist 'Er | George Dewhurst | Mary Brough, Humberston Wright | Comedy | |
| Somehow Good | Jack Raymond | Fay Compton, Stewart Rome | Drama | |
| The Somme | M. A. Wetherell | | Documentary | World War I battle reconstruction |
| Sorrell and Son | Herbert Brenon | H. B. Warner, Anna Q. Nilsson | Drama | |
| Tip Toes | Herbert Wilcox | Dorothy Gish, Will Rogers | Drama | |
| A Woman in Pawn | Edwin Greenwood | Gladys Jennings, John Stuart | Comedy | |
| A Woman Redeemed | Sinclair Hill | Joan Lockton, Brian Aherne | Crime | |

== See also ==
- 1927 in British music
- 1927 in British television
- 1927 in film
- 1927 in the United Kingdom
