= 1927 in film =

The following is an overview of 1927 in film, including significant events, a list of films released and notable births and deaths.

== Events ==
- January 10 – Fritz Lang's science-fiction fantasy Metropolis premieres in Germany. The film receives its American premiere in New York City on March 6.
- March 11 – World's largest movie theatre, the Roxy Theatre, opens in New York City.
- April 7 – Abel Gance's Napoleon often considered his best known and greatest masterpiece, premieres (in a shortened version) at the Paris Opéra and demonstrates techniques and equipment that will not be revived for years to come, such as hand-held cameras, and what is often considered the first widescreen projection format Polyvision.
- May 11 – The Academy of Motion Picture Arts and Sciences is founded in Los Angeles by Douglas Fairbanks. The 1st Academy Awards (Oscars) will be awarded to films which are released in 1927 or 1928.
- August 12 – Paramount's dramatic film Wings, which will go on to win the first Academy Award for Best Picture, opens at the Criterion Theater in New York City, with an unheard-of roadshow admission price of $2.00 per ticket.
- September 5 – Nicholas Schenck becomes president of Loews Inc. following the death of Marcus Loew.
- September 7 – Oswald the Lucky Rabbit debuts in Trolley Troubles.
- September 23 – Fox Films acquires the rights to the Tri-Ergon sound-on-film technology, which had been developed in 1919 by three German inventors, Josef Engl, Hans Vogt, and Joseph Massole.
- October 6 – The Jazz Singer, starring Al Jolson, premieres at the Warner Theater in New York City. Although not the first 'talkie', The Jazz Singer becomes the first box-office hit and popularizes sound motion pictures. It is the highest-grossing movie up to this time.
- December 3 – The silent short Putting Pants on Philip, the first official billing of comedy duo Laurel and Hardy, is released in the United States.
- Ang Manananggal, the first Filipino horror film, is released in the Philippines.
- Cinematograph Films Act sets a minimum quota for British films to be shown in British cinemas.
- Italian Alberto Rabagliati wins a Rudolph Valentino look-alike contest and moves to Hollywood to start his acting career.
- The Three Tramps, the first Filipino comedy film featuring the Silos brothers, is released in the Philippines.

== Academy Awards ==
- Best Production: Wings
- Best Artistic Quality: Sunrise
- Best Actor: Emil Jannings for The Way of All Flesh and the 1928 movie The Last Command
- Best Actress: Janet Gaynor for Seventh Heaven and Sunrise, as well as the 1928 movie Street Angel
- Best Director (Dramatic Picture): Frank Borzage for Seventh Heaven
- Best Director (Comedy Picture): Lewis Milestone for Two Arabian Knights

== Top-grossing films (U.S.) ==
The top ten 1927 released films by box office gross in North America are as follows:

Highest-grossing films of 1927
Rank	Title	Distributor	Domestic rentals
1	The King of Kings	Pathé Exchange	$2,641,687
2	The Jazz Singer	Warner Bros.	$1,974,000
3	7th Heaven	Fox Film	$1,750,000
4	The Gaucho	United Artists	$1,400,000
5	The Patent Leather Kid; Jesse James	First National; Paramount	$1,200,000
6	Wings	Paramount	$1,100,000
7	My Best Girl	United Artists	$1,027,757
8	Love	MGM	$946,000
9	The Student Prince in Old Heidelberg	MGM	$894,000
10	Sunrise: A Song of Two Humans	Fox Film	$818,000

== Notable films released in 1927 ==
For the complete list of US film releases for the year, see United States films of 1927

=== # ===
- 7th Heaven, directed by Frank Borzage, starring Janet Gaynor and Charles Farrell

=== A ===
- Ang Manananggal, directed by José Nepomuceno, starring Mary Walter – (Philippines)
- Annie Laurie, directed by John S. Robertson, starring Lillian Gish and Norman Kerry

=== B ===
- Bed and Sofa (Tretya meshchanskaya), directed by Abram Room – (U.S.S.R.)
- The Beloved Rogue, directed by Alan Crosland, starring John Barrymore, Conrad Veidt and Marceline Day
- Belphégor, directed by Henri Desfontaines – (France)
- Berlin: Symphony of a Metropolis (Berlin: Die Sinfonie der Großstadt), directed by Walter Ruttmann – (Germany)
- Bigamy (Bigamie), directed by Jaap Speyer, starring Heinrich George – (Germany)
- Blighty, directed by Adrian Brunel, starring Ellaline Terriss and Lillian Hall-Davis – (GB)
- The Bugle Call (lost), directed by Edward Sedgwick, starring Jackie Coogan

=== C ===
- The Cat and the Canary, directed by Paul Leni, starring Laura La Plante and Creighton Hale, based on the 1922 stage play by John Willard
- Chicago, directed by Frank Urson, starring Phyllis Haver
- Children of Divorce, directed by Frank Lloyd, starring Clara Bow, Esther Ralston and Gary Cooper
- The Chinese Parrot (lost), directed by Paul Leni
- The Club of the Big Deed (Soyuz velikogo dela), directed by Grigori Kozintsev and Leonid Trauberg – (U.S.S.R.)
- College, directed by James W. Horne and Buster Keaton, starring Buster Keaton
- Confetti, directed by Graham Cutts, starring Jack Buchanan and Annette Benson – (GB)

=== D ===
- The Dove, directed by Roland West, starring Norma Talmadge, Noah Beery Sr. and Gilbert Roland
- Downhill, directed by Alfred Hitchcock, starring Ivor Novello and Isabel Jeans – (GB)
- The Drop Kick, directed by Millard Webb, starring Richard Barthelmess

=== E ===
- Easy Pickings, directed by George Archainbaud, starring Anna Q. Nilsson, based on the stage play by Paul A. Kruger and William A. Burton
- Education of a Prince (Éducation de Prince), directed by Henri Diamant-Berger – (France)
- The End of St. Petersburg (Konets Sankt-Peterburga), directed by Vsevolod Pudovkin – (U.S.S.R.)

=== F ===
- The Fair Co-Ed, directed by Sam Wood; starring Marion Davies and Johnny Mack Brown
- The Filipino Woman (La Mujer Filipina), directed by José Nepomuceno – (Philippines)
- The First Auto, directed by Roy Del Ruth, starring Barney Oldfield and Patsy Ruth Miller
- Flesh and the Devil, directed by Clarence Brown, starring John Gilbert, Greta Garbo and Lars Hanson
- The Forty-First (Sorok pervyy), directed by Yakov Protazanov – (U.S.S.R.)

=== G ===
- The Gaucho, directed by F. Richard Jones, starring Douglas Fairbanks and Lupe Vélez
- Ghost Train (Der Geisterzug), directed by Géza von Bolváry, starring Guy Newall – (GB/Germany)
- The Gorilla, directed by Alfred Santell, starring Charles Murray and Walter Pidgeon, based on the 1925 stage play by Ralph Spence

=== H ===
- Her Wild Oat, directed by Marshall Neilan, starring Colleen Moore
- His First Flame, directed by Harry Edwards, starring Harry Langdon
- His Greatest Bluff (Sein größter Bluff), directed by Henrik Galeen and Harry Piel – (Germany)
- The Honorable Mr. Buggs, directed by Fred Jackman, starring Matt Moore, Anna May Wong and Oliver Hardy
- Hot Kisses, directed by José Nepomuceno – (Philippines)
- Hula, directed by Victor Fleming, starring Clara Bow
- Husband Hunters, directed by John G. Adolfi, starring Mae Busch, Jean Arthur and Mildred Harris

=== I ===
- It, directed by Clarence G. Badger, starring Clara Bow and Antonio Moreno

=== J ===
- The Jazz Singer, directed by Alan Crosland, starring Al Jolson, May McAvoy and Warner Oland
- Johann the Coffinmaker, directed by Robert Florey
- Johnny Get Your Hair Cut, directed by B. Reeves Eason and Archie Mayo, starring Jackie Coogan and Harry Carey

=== K ===
- The Kid Brother, directed by Ted Wilde, starring Harold Lloyd and Jobyna Ralston
- The King of Kings, directed by Cecil B. DeMille, starring H. B. Warner, Dorothy Cumming and Joseph Schildkraut

=== L ===
- The Lady in Ermine (lost), directed by James Flood, starring Corinne Griffith
- Laila, directed by Aziza Amir, starring Aziza Amir and Stephan Rosti – (Egypt)
- The Lodger: A Story of the London Fog, directed by Alfred Hitchcock, starring Ivor Novello, based on the novel by Marie Belloc Lowndes – (GB)
- London After Midnight (lost), written and directed by Tod Browning, starring Lon Chaney, Marceline Day and Conrad Nagel
- Long Pants, directed by Frank Capra, starring Harry Langdon
- The Love of Jeanne Ney (Die Liebe der Jeanne Ney), directed by G.W. Pabst – (Germany)
- The Love of Sunya, directed by Albert Parker, starring Gloria Swanson
- The Loves of Carmen, directed by Raoul Walsh, starring Dolores del Río and Victor McLaglen

=== M ===
- Madame Pompadour, directed by Herbert Wilcox, starring Dorothy Gish and Antonio Moreno – (GB)
- Man from the Restaurant (Chelovek iz restorana), directed by Yakov Protazanov – (U.S.S.R.)
- The Manor House of Fear (Le Manoir de la Peur), directed by Alfred Machin and Henry Wulschleger, starring Romuald Joubé – (France)
- Mata Hari, directed by Friedrich Feher, starring Magda Sonja – (Germany)
- Metropolis, directed by Fritz Lang, starring Alfred Abel – (Germany)
- Mockery, directed by Benjamin Christensen, starring Lon Chaney and Ricardo Cortez
- The Mountain Eagle (lost), directed by Alfred Hitchcock, starring Nita Naldi – (GB/Germany)
- My Best Girl, directed by Sam Taylor, starring Mary Pickford and Charles "Buddy" Rogers

=== N ===
- Napoléon, directed by Abel Gance, starring Albert Dieudonné – (France)
- Noidan kirot (The Curse of the Witch), directed by Teuvo Puro – (Finland)

=== O ===
- The Only Way, directed by Herbert Wilcox, starring John Martin Harvey and Madge Stuart – (GB)

=== P ===
- The Patent Leather Kid, directed by Alfred Santell, starring Richard Barthelmess
- Prelude, written and directed by Castleton Knight, based on the short story The Premature Burial by Edgar Allan Poe – (GB)
- The Private Life of Helen of Troy (lost), directed by Alexander Korda, starring María Corda, Lewis Stone and Ricardo Cortez

=== Q ===
- Quality Street, directed by Sidney Franklin, starring Marion Davies and Conrad Nagel
- The Queen of Spades, directed by Aleksandr Razumny, based on the 1833 short story Pikovaya Dama by Alexander Pushkin – (Germany)
- Quinneys, directed by Maurice Elvey, starring John Longden and Alma Taylor – (GB)

=== R ===
- The Red Mill, directed by William Goodrich (Roscoe "Fatty" Arbuckle), starring Marion Davies
- The Ring, directed by Alfred Hitchcock, starring Carl Brisson and Lillian Hall-Davis – (GB)
- Robinson Crusoe, directed by M. A. Wetherell, based on the novel by Daniel Defoe – (GB)
- Romance of the Western Chamber, directed by Hou Yao – (China)

=== S ===
- The Scar of Shame, directed by Frank Peregini
- Shooting Stars, directed by Anthony Asquith and A.V. Bramble – (GB)
- The Show, directed by Tod Browning, starring John Gilbert, Renée Adorée and Lionel Barrymore, based on the 1910 novel The Day of Souls by Charles Tenney Jackson
- Singed, directed by John Griffith Wray, starring Blanche Sweet and Warner Baxter
- Slide, Kelly, Slide, directed by Edward Sedgwick, starring William Haines, Sally O'Neil and Harry Carey
- Sorrell and Son, directed by Herbert Brenon, starring H. B. Warner and Anna Q. Nilsson – (GB)
- Spring Fever, directed by Edward Sedgwick, starring William Haines, Joan Crawford and George K. Arthur
- The Student Prince in Old Heidelberg, directed by Ernst Lubitsch, starring Ramón Novarro and Norma Shearer
- Sunrise: A Song of Two Humans, directed by F. W. Murnau, starring Janet Gaynor and George O'Brien
- Svengali, directed by Gennaro Righelli, starring Paul Wegener, based on the 1894 novel Trilby by George du Maurier – (Germany)

=== T ===
- The Telephone Girl, directed by Herbert Brenon, starring Madge Bellamy and Warner Baxter
- The Three Tramps, directed by Manuel Silos – (Philippines)
- Tillie the Toiler, directed by Hobart Henley, starring Marion Davies
- Topsy and Eva, directed by Del Lord, starring Rosetta Duncan and Vivian Duncan
- Twelve Miles Out, directed by Jack Conway, starring John Gilbert, Ernest Torrence and Joan Crawford

=== U ===
- Uncle Tom's Cabin, directed by Harry A. Pollard
- Underworld, directed by Josef von Sternberg, starring Clive Brook, Evelyn Brent and George Bancroft
- The Unknown, directed by Tod Browning, starring Lon Chaney, Norman Kerry and Joan Crawford

=== W ===
- The Way of All Flesh (lost), directed by Victor Fleming, starring Emil Jannings
- West Point, directed by Edward Sedgwick, starring William Haines and Joan Crawford
- When a Man Loves, directed by Alan Crosland, starring John Barrymore, Dolores Costello and Warner Oland
- Why Girls Love Sailors, directed by Fred Guiol, starring Stan Laurel and Oliver Hardy
- Wings, directed by William A. Wellman, starring Clara Bow, Charles 'Buddy' Rogers, Richard Arlen and Gary Cooper
- The Wizard (lost), directed by Richard Rosson, starring Edmund Lowe and Leila Hyams, based on the 1911 novel Balaoo by Gaston Leroux

== Comedy film series ==
- Our Gang (1922–1944)
- Harry Langdon (1924–1936)
- Laurel and Hardy (1921–1945)

== Animated short film series ==
- Felix the Cat (1919–1936)
- Aesop's Film Fables (1921–1933)
- Ko-Ko Song Car-Tunes (1924-1927)
- Alice Comedies
  - Alice the Golf Bug
  - Alice Foils the Pirates
  - Alice at the Carnival
  - Alice at the Rodeo
  - Alice the Collegiate
  - Alice in the Alps
  - Alice's Auto Race
  - Alice's Circus Daze
  - Alice's Knaughty Knight
  - Alice's Three Bad Eggs
  - Alice's Picnic
  - Alice's Channel Swim
  - Alice in the Klondike
  - Alice's Medicine Show
  - Alice the Whaler
  - Alice the Beach Nut
  - Alice in the Big League
- Krazy Kat (1925–1940)
- Un-Natural History (1925-1927)
- Pete the Pup (1926-1927)
- Inkwell Imps (1927–1929)
- Oswald the Lucky Rabbit
  - Trolley Troubles
  - Oh Teacher
  - The Mechanical Cow
  - Great Guns!
  - All Wet
  - The Ocean Hop
  - The Banker's Daughter
  - Empty Socks
  - Rickety Gin
- Newslaffs (1927–1928)

== Births ==
- January 4 – Barbara Rush, American actress (died 2024)
- January 10 – Lee Philips, American actor (died 1999)
- January 15 – Phyllis Coates, American actress (died 2023)
- January 17 – Eartha Kitt, American actress and singer (died 2008)
- January 19 - Lisa Lu, Chinese-born American actress
- January 22 – Walter Sparrow, English actor (died 2000)
- January 26
  - Erni Mangold, Austrian actress (died 2026)
  - William Redfield, American actor (died 1976)
- January 28 – Hiroshi Teshigahara, Japanese director (died 2001)
- January 29 – Peter Fernandez, American actor, voice director and writer (died 2010)
- January 31 – Jean Speegle Howard, American actress (died 2000)
- February 3 – Kenneth Anger, American underground experimental filmmaker and actor (died 2023)
- February 7 – Juliette Gréco, French singer and actress (died 2020)
- February 12
  - Ann Gillis, American actress (died 2018)
  - Eric Mason, British actor (died 2010)
  - H. M. Wynant, American actor
- February 14 – Lois Maxwell, Canadian actress (died 2007)
- February 15 - Harvey Korman, American actor and comedian (died 2008)
- February 16 – June Brown, English actress (died 2022)
- February 20 – Sidney Poitier, American actor (died 2022)
- March 1 – Harry Belafonte, American singer and actor (died 2023)
- March 4 - Thayer David, American actor (died 1978)
- March 7 – James Broderick, American actor and director (died 1982)
- March 9 - Eddie Powell, British stuntman and actor (died 2000)
- March 15 - Christian Marquand, French actor (died 2000)
- March 18 - George Plimpton, American actor (died 2003)
- March 20 – Cairbre (also known as Leo), Dublin Zoo-born Metro-Goldwyn-Mayer lion mascot
- March 21 – Virginia Weidler, American actress (died 1968)
- March 25 – Monique van Vooren, Belgian-American actress (died 2020)
- March 31 – William Daniels, American actor
- April 1 – Maria Eugénia, Portuguese actress (died 2016)
- April 2
  - Rita Gam, American actress (died 2016)
  - Ken Sansom, American actor and voice actor (died 2012)
- April 3 - Robert Hoy, American actor, stuntman and director (died 2010)
- April 5 – Chao-Li Chi, Shanxi-born actor (died 2010)
- April 13 – Maurice Ronet, French film actor, director and writer (died 1983)
- April 14 – Allen Baron, American writer, director
- April 16 – Peter Mark Richman, American actor (died 2021)
- April 19 – Cora Sue Collins, American child actress (died 2025)
- April 30 – Ellen Alaküla, Estonian actress (died 2011)
- May 2 - Ray Barrett, Australian actor (died 2009)
- May 5 – Pat Carroll, American actress (died 2022)
- May 6 – Ettore Manni, Italian actor (died 1979)
- May 11
  - Bernard Fox, Welsh actor (died 2016)
  - Mort Sahl, Canadian-born American comedian and actor (died 2021)
- May 13 – Herbert Ross, American film director, producer and choreographer (died 2001)
- May 20 – David Hedison, American actor (died 2019)
- May 21 – Kay Kendall, English actress, comedienne (died 1959)
- May 22 – Michael Constantine, Greek American actor (died 2021)
- May 30 – Clint Walker, American actor (died 2018)
- May 31 – Koreyoshi Kurahara, Malaysian-Japanese screenwriter, director (died 2002)
- June 2 – Thomas Hill, Indian-born American character actor (died 2009)
- June 8 – Jerry Stiller, American actor and comedian (died 2020)
- June 9 – Waltraut Haas, Austrian actress and singer (died 2025)
- June 15 – Ottó Foky, Hungarian animator (died 2012)
- June 23 – Bob Fosse, American dancer, musical theatre choreographer, screenwriter and director (died 1987)
- June 24 - Bette Ford, American actress
- June 27 – Geoffrey Palmer, British actor (died 2020)
- June 30
  - Mario Lanfranchi, Italian director, screenwriter, producer and actor (died 2022)
  - Pat McCormick, American actor and writer (died 2005)
- July 2 - Brock Peters, American actor and singer (died 2005)
- July 3 - Tim O'Connor, American character actor (died 2018)
- July 4
  - Gina Lollobrigida, Italian actress (died 2023)
  - Neil Simon, American playwright and screenwriter (died 2018)
- July 5 – Beverly Tyler, American actress, singer (died 2005)
- July 6 – Janet Leigh, American actress (died 2004)
- July 9
  - Ed Ames, American singer and actor (died 2023)
  - Susan Cabot, American actress (died 1986)
- July 15
  - Nan Martin, American actress (died 2010)
  - Joe Turkel, American character actor (died 2022)
- July 27 - Henry O, Chinese-American actor
- July 30
  - Richard Johnson, British actor, writer and producer (died 2015)
  - Joan Vohs, American model, actress (died 2001)
- August 4 - Jean Lodge, British actress (died 2026)
- August 9 – Robert Shaw, British actor and novelist (died 1978)
- August 14 – Roger Carel (Bancharel), French voice actor (died 2020)
- August 16 - Ann Blyth, American actress and singer (died 2026)
- August 19 – L. Q. Jones, American actor (died 2022)
- August 20 - Yootha Joyce, English actress (died 1980)
  - August 21 – Tony Steedman, English character actor (died 2001)
  - Barry Foster (actor), British actor (died 2002)
- August 30 – Bill Daily, American actor (died 2018)
- September 9 – Penelope Houston, English critic (died 2015)
- September 12
  - Freddie Jones, English actor (died 2019)
  - Franco Latini, Italian actor and voice actor (died 1991)
- September 13 - Beverly Polcyn, American actress (died 2018)
- September 16 – Peter Falk, American actor (died 2011)
- September 19
  - Rosemary Harris, English actress
  - William Hickey, American actor (died 1997)
- September 20 - Rachel Roberts, Welsh actress (died 1980)
- September 21 - Joan Hotchkis, American actress and writer (died 2022)
- September 24 – Arthur Malet, English actor (died 2013)
- September 26 - Patrick O'Neal, American actor (died 1994)
- October 1 – Tom Bosley, American actor (died 2010)
- October 7 - Al Martino, American singer and actor (died 2009)
- October 14 – Roger Moore, English actor (died 2017)
- October 15 – Jeannette Charles, British actress (died 2024)
- October 16 – Eileen Ryan, American actress (died 2022)
- October 18 – George C. Scott, American film and stage actor (died 1999)
- October 21 - Howard Zieff, American director and producer (died 2009)
- October 27 – Silvia Laidla, Estonian actress (died 2012)
- November 1 – Marcel Ophuls, German-French documentary filmmaker and actor (died 2025)
- November 3 - Florence Paterson, Canadian actress (died 1995)
- November 12 – John Hollis, British screen actor (died 2005)
- November 17
  - Fenella Fielding, English actress (died 2018)
  - Lynn Stalmaster, American casting director (died 2021)
- November 14 – McLean Stevenson, American actor (died 1996)
- November 16 - Shriram Lagoo, Indian actor (died 2019)
- November 20
  - Walter Kohut, Austrian actor (died 1980)
  - Estelle Parsons, American actress
- November 23 – Sybil Jason, American actress (died 2011)
- November 30 – Robert Guillaume, American actor and singer (died 2017)
- December 13 - Genevieve Page, French actress (died 2025)
- December 26 - Chuck Hicks, American actor and stuntman (died 2021)
- December 27 - Alan Mandell, Canadian-American actor (died 2026)
- December 29 – Giorgio Capitani, Italian film director and screenwriter (died 2017)
- December 30 – Bernard Barrow, American Actor (died 1993)

== Deaths ==
- January 13 – Arnold Daly, American actor, playwright and producer (born 1875)
- March 17 – Charles Emmett Mack, American actor (born 1900)
- April 25 – Earle Williams, American actor (born 1880)
- May 7 – Bruce McRae, American stage and screen actor (born 1867)
- May 16 – Sam Bernard, English stage and screen actor (born 1863)
- May 20 – Oscar Stribolt, Danish actor (born 1873)
- June 3 – Einar Hanson, Swedish stage and screen actor (born 1897)
- June 4 – Robert McKim, American actor (born 1877)
- July 26 – June Mathis, American screenwriter (born 1887)
- September 5 – Marcus Loew, American theatre chain executive & founder of Loews Theatres (born 1870)
- October 5 – Sam Warner, American co-founder of Warner Brothers studios (born 1887)
- October 13 – Hughie Mack, American actor (born 1884)
- November 4 – Valli Valli, German stage and film actress (born 1882)
- December 6 – Kate Toncray, American actress (born 1867)
- December 16 – Romaine Fielding, American actor and director (born 1868)
- December 24 – Julia Bruns, American stage & film actress (born 1895)

== Film debuts ==
- Annabella – Napoléon
- Dorothy Appleby – Paradise for Two
- Robert Armstrong – The Main Event
- Matilde Artero – La ilustre fregona
- Hermione Baddeley – A Daughter in Revolt
- Joan Barclay – The Gaucho
- Louise Beavers – Uncle Tom's Cabin
- Chili Bouchier – Mumsie
- Johnny Mack Brown – The Bugle Call
- Walter Byron – White Heat
- Nancy Carroll – Ladies Must Dress
- Claudette Colbert – For the Love of Mike
- June Collyer – Broadway Nights
- William Demarest – Finger Prints
- Ruth Donnelly – Rubber Heels
- Sally Eilers – The Red Mill
- Reginald Gardiner – The Lodger: A Story of the London Fog
- Eve Gray – The Lodger: A Story of the London Fog
- Virginia Grey – Uncle Tom's Cabin
- Brigitte Helm – Metropolis
- Dennis Hoey – Tip Toes
- Sterling Holloway – Casey at the Bat
- Renée Houston – Blighty
- Harold Huth – One of the Best
- Elsa Lanchester – One of the Best
- Inge Landgut – Violantha
- Nora Lane – Don Mike
- Herbert Marshall – Mumsie
- Milly Mathis – The Love of Jeanne Ney
- Joel McCrea – The Fair Co-Ed
- Dickie Moore – The Beloved Rogue
- Elisabeth Neumann-Viertel – Sister Veronika
- Fritz Odemar – The Merry Vineyard
- Helen Parrish – Babe Comes Home
- Wally Patch – Blighty
- Mickey Rooney – Orchids and Ermine
- Angelo Rossitto – The Beloved Rogue
- Ann Sothern – Broadway Nights
- Barbara Stanwyck – Broadway Nights
- George E. Stone – Seventh Heaven
- Enid Stamp Taylor – Land of Hope and Glory
- George Tobias – The Lunatic
- Dorothy Tree – It
- Frederick Valk – Out of the Mist
- Lupe Vélez – The Gaucho
