= 1927 in British music =

This is a summary of 1927 in music in the United Kingdom.

== Events ==
- 1 January – The British Broadcasting Company is turned into a Corporation and granted a Royal Charter with a public remit. Sir John Reith is appointed as the first Director General.
- 15 January – The first performance of the Fantasie Sonata by Australian composer Roy Agnew (in London studying with Gerrard Williams and Cyril Scott) at the Wigmore Hall, played by William Murdoch.
- 20 January – On his way to the His Master's Voice's studios at Hayes, Middlesex, bandleader Jack Hylton is involved in a serious road accident.
- January
  - Peter Warlock's string serenade is recorded for the National Gramophonic Society, by John Barbirolli and an improvised chamber orchestra; it is the first recording of the composer's work ever to be released.
  - Edward Clark transfers from BBC Newcastle to London as a programme planner, at the request of Percy Pitt.
- 15 March – The String Quartet No 2 by Arnold Bax is performed for the first time at the Grotrian Hall in London.
- 25 March – William Alwyn completes his Five Preludes for Orchestra.
- 30 March – A whole evening of music by 21 year-old Christian Darnton is put on at the Grotrian Hall in London, financed by the composer’s parents. Although Darnton had been receiving other performances independently (including one of his Octet at the same hall four days earlier), the event has the unintended effect of straining his relationships with other composers and critics. Peter Warlock and Cecil Gray in particular went along to disrupt the proceedings, viewing it as an example of unmerited privilege.
- 7 July – The first British record programme, presented by Christopher Stone, the UK's first disc jockey, is broadcast by the BBC.
- 13 August – The first Promenade Concert to be held under the auspices of the British Broadcasting Corporation. The Proms had been founded 32 years earlier by Henry Wood and his co-founder Robert Newman, who had died the year before. The first night at the Queen’s Hall includes Elgar’s Cockagnie Overture and Stanford’s Songs of the Sea.
- 20 August – There is a willow grows aslant a brook for orchestra by Frank Bridge is performed for the first time at The Proms in Queen’s Hall, the composer conducting.
- 24 October – The Housman song cycle Along the Field for voice and violin by Ralph Vaughan Williams was performed for the first time, at the Grotrian Hall, London.
- 27 October – The first performance of the orchestral Enter Spring by Frank Bridge takes place at the Norwich Triennial Festival, which commissioned the piece.
- 6 December – The first 20th century staging of Monteverdi‘s 1642 opera The Coronation of Poppea in the UK takes place at Oxford University. It’s a student production, following on from another student production in the US (Smith College, Northampton, Mass.) on April 27, 1927. The first 20th professional production has to wait until 1962 at Glyndbourne.
- date unknown
  - Rebecca Clarke forms the English Ensemble piano quartet with Marjorie Hayward, Kathleen Long and May Mukle.
  - Gustav Holst is commissioned by the New York Symphony Orchestra to write a symphony, but does not do so. Instead, he starts work on the tone poem Egdon Heath, which is premiered by the NYSO in the following year.
  - The first recordings of Frederick Delius's music are conducted by Thomas Beecham for the Columbia label: the "Walk to the Paradise Garden" interlude from A Village Romeo and Juliet, and On Hearing the First Cuckoo in Spring, performed by the orchestra of the Royal Philharmonic Society.

== Popular music ==
- Herbert Farjeon – "I've danced with a man, who's danced with a girl, who's danced with the Prince of Wales".
- Will Fyffe – "I Belong to Glasgow"

== Classical music: new works ==
- Arnold Bax – Northern Ballad No. 1
- Arthur Bliss – Oboe Quintet
- Havergal Brian – Symphony No. 1 Gothic
- Frank Bridge – Rhapsody: Enter Spring
- Edward Elgar – Civic Fanfare
- Gerald Finzi – Violin Concerto
- Victor Hely-Hutchinson – Carol Symphony
- John Ireland – Sonatina
- Albert Ketèlbey – By the Blue Hawaiian Waters
- Constant Lambert – The Rio Grande

== Opera ==
- Geoffrey Toye – The Red Pen, with libretto by A. P. Herbert.

== Musical theatre ==
- 1 December – The review Clowns in Clover opens at the Adelphi Theatre; it runs for 508 performances.

== Births ==
- 15 January – Francis Routh, composer and author (died 2021)
- 26 January – Ronnie Scott, jazz musician and club owner (died 1996)
- 7 February – Laurie Johnson, composer (died 2024)
- 10 February – Brian Priestman, conductor and music teacher (died 2014)
- 20 March – John Joubert, South African–born British composer (d. 2019)
- 12 June – Al Fairweather, jazz musician (died 1993)
- 14 June – Elaine Hugh-Jones, pianist and composer (died 2021)
- 23 June – Kenneth McKellar, tenor (died 2010)
- 4 July – Patricia Kern, mezzo-soprano (died 2015)
- 19 July – John Hopkins, orchestral conductor who worked in the UK, New Zealand and Australia (died 2013)
- 11 August – Raymond Leppard, conductor
- 25 September – Sir Colin Davis, orchestral conductor (died 2013)
- 28 October – Cleo Laine, singer (died 2025)
- 9 November – Ken Dodd, comedian and singer (died 2018)
- 7 December – Helen Watts, contralto (died 2009)
- 26 December – Denis Quilley, actor and singer (died 2003)

== Deaths ==
- 26 February – Isabel Jay, singer and actress with the d'Oyly Carte Opera Company, 47
- 17 March – James Scott Skinner, violinist, 83
- 31 March – Edward Lloyd, concert and oratorio tenor, 82
- 16 May – Sam Bernard, entertainer, 63
- 28 October – Joseph Eaton Faning, composer and teacher, 77
- 2 November – Fred Billington, singer and actor with the d'Oyly Carte, 63
- 4 November – Valli Valli, German-born British actress, 45
- 21 December – Courtice Pounds, singer and actor with the d'Oyly Carte, 65

date unknown – Haldane Burgess, writer and musician, 65

== See also ==
- 1927 in British television
- 1927 in the United Kingdom
- List of British films of 1927
