= 1927 in British television =

This is a list of British television related events in 1927.

== Events ==
Month	Day	Event
January	1	The British Broadcasting Company becomes the British Broadcasting Corporation.
May	24	John Logie Baird transmits a television signal from London to Glasgow by telephone line.
September	7	The Television Society is founded. It will gain Royal patronage in 1966, becoming the Royal Television Society.
September	20	John Logie Baird demonstrates the first ever system for recording television. His Phonovision VideoDisc apparatus records 30-line television pictures and sound on conventional 78 rpm gramophone records.

== Births ==
Month	Day	Name	Occupation
February	7	Laurie Johnson	television theme composer (The Avengers) (died 2024)
February	16	June Brown	actress (EastEnders) (died 2022)
February	28	Harry H. Corbett	actor (Steptoe and Son) (died 1982)
April	26	Jack Douglas	comic actor (died 2008)
May	4	Terry Scott	comedy actor (Terry and June) (died 1994)
June	4	Geoffrey Palmer	comedy actor (As Time Goes By) (died 2020)
June	13	Brian Wilde	comedy actor (Porridge, Last of the Summer Wine) (died 2008)
August	20	Yootha Joyce	comedy actress (Man About the House, George & Mildred) (died 1980)
July	20	Heather Chasen	radio & television actress (Crossroads, EastEnders) (died 2020)
August	23	Peter Wyngarde	actor (Department S, Jason King) (died 2018)
October	1	Sandy Gall	newscaster (ITV News at Ten) (died 2025)
October	14	Roger Moore	screen actor (The Saint) (died 2017)
November	8	Ken Dodd	comedian (died 2018)

== See also ==
- 1927 in British music
- 1927 in the United Kingdom
- List of British films of 1927
