= His Wife's Husband =

His Wife's Husband may refer to:

- His Wife's Husband (1922 American film), directed by Kenneth S. Webb
- His Wife's Husband (1922 British film), directed by George A. Cooper
