= Christopher Leonard =

Christopher or Chris Leonard may refer to:

- Chris Leonard (1927–1987), footballer
- Christopher Leonard (author) (born 1975)
- Chris Leonard (singer) (born 1995), member of pop and r&b band Stereo Kicks
- Christopher Leonard, rower, see United States at the 2013 Summer Universiade
- Chris Leonard (born 1979), songwriter and member of pop-punk band Son of Dork
- Christopher Leonard, injured during the death of Lucas Leonard
