= Queen Kelly =

1929 film directed by Erich von Stroheim

- Directed by: Erich von Stroheim; Uncredited: Richard Boleslawski
- Written by: Erich von Stroheim; Uncredited: Benjamin Glazer; Laura Hope Crews; Richard Boleslawski; Titles: Marian Ainslee
- Story by: Erich von Stroheim
- Produced by: Joseph P. Kennedy; Erich von Stroheim; Gloria Swanson
- Starring: Gloria Swanson; Walter Byron; Seena Owen; Tully Marshall
- Cinematography: Paul Ivano; William H. Daniels; Gordon Pollock; Hal Mohr (uncredited); Gregg Toland (European ending)
- Edited by: Viola Lawrence; Uncredited: Richard Boleslawski
- Music by: Adolf Tandler
- Distributed by: United Artists
- Release dates: October 1932 (Argentina); November 1932 (France)
- Running time: 101 minutes
- Country: United States
- Languages: Silent film English intertitles
- Budget: $800,000 (approx.)
- Box office: $50,221

Queen Kelly is an American silent film produced in 1928–29 and released by United Artists. The film was directed by Erich von Stroheim, starring Gloria Swanson in the title role, Walter Byron as her lover, and Seena Owen. The film was produced by Joseph P. Kennedy, who was Swanson's lover at the time.

In 1932, a part-sound version was released, directed by Richard Boleslawski and filmed by cinematographer Gregg Toland, with a rewritten ending. The release was limited to Europe and South America due to a clause in Stroheim's contract.

== Plot ==
Reconstructed version of Queen Kelly

Prince Wolfram is betrothed to mad Queen Regina V of Kronberg. As punishment for partying with other women, he is sent on maneuvers. He sees Kitty Kelly walking with other convent students and flirts with her. She is embarrassed when he makes a comment after seeing that her underwear is visible, so she takes it off and throws it at him, to the horror of the nuns, who punish her for her "indecency".

Enthralled by her beauty, he kidnaps her that night from the convent, takes her to his room and professes his love for her. When the queen finds them together the next morning, she whips Kelly and throws her out of the castle. Regina then puts Wolfram in prison for not wanting to marry her.

=== Endings ===
In the original ending, Kelly goes to German East Africa to visit her dying aunt and is forced to marry a repulsive man named Jan. The aunt dies after the wedding and Kelly refuses to live with him, instead becoming the madam of her aunt's brothel. Her extravagances and style earn her the name "Queen Kelly".

In the alternate ending, Kelly dies in despair after her humiliation at the hands of the queen and a contrite Wolfram visits her body.

== Cast ==
- Gloria Swanson - Patricia 'Kitty' Kelly, aka Queen Kelly
- Walter Byron - Prince Wolfram
- Seena Owen - Queen Regina V
- Sylvia Ashton - Kelly's Aunt
- Wilson Benge - Prince Wolfram's Valet
- Sidney Bracey - Prince Wolfram's Lackey
- Florence Gibson - Kelly's Aunt
- Madge Hunt - Mother Superior
- Tully Marshall - Jan Vryheid
- Madame Sul-Te-Wan - Kali Sana, Aunt's Cook
- Wilhelm von Brincken - Prince Wolfram's adjutant
- Gordon Westcott - Lackey

== Production ==
Whipping scene with Seena Owen and Gloria Swanson

Swanson had left Paramount Pictures in 1926 to become an independent producer with United Artists, for whom she starred in and produced The Love of Sunya (1927) and Sadie Thompson (1928). She was persuaded to make her next film with Eric von Stroheim by Joseph P. Kennedy, whom Swanson had met in November 1927 and later began an affair. Queen Kelly was based on a story and script by Stroheim entitled The Swamp, which he renamed reluctantly following pressure from United Artists.

The production of the costly film was shut down after complaints by Swanson about the direction the film was taking. Though the European scenes were full of innuendo, and featured a philandering prince and a sex-crazed queen, the scenes set in Africa were grim and, Swanson felt, distasteful. In later interviews, Swanson had claimed that she had been misled by the script which referred to her character arriving in, and taking over, a dance hall; looking at the rushes, it was obvious the 'dance hall' was actually a brothel.

Stroheim was fired from the film, and the African storyline scrapped. Swanson and Kennedy still wanted to salvage the European material because it had been so costly and time-consuming, and had potential market value. An alternate ending was, however, shot on November 24, 1931. In this ending, Kelly dies after her experiences with the prince (it is implied to be suicide). Prince Wolfram is shown visiting the palace. A nun leads him to the chapel, where Kelly's body lies in state. These scenes were directed by Richard Boleslawski, photographed by Gregg Toland, and edited by Viola Lawrence. This has been called the 'Swanson Ending'.

== Distribution ==
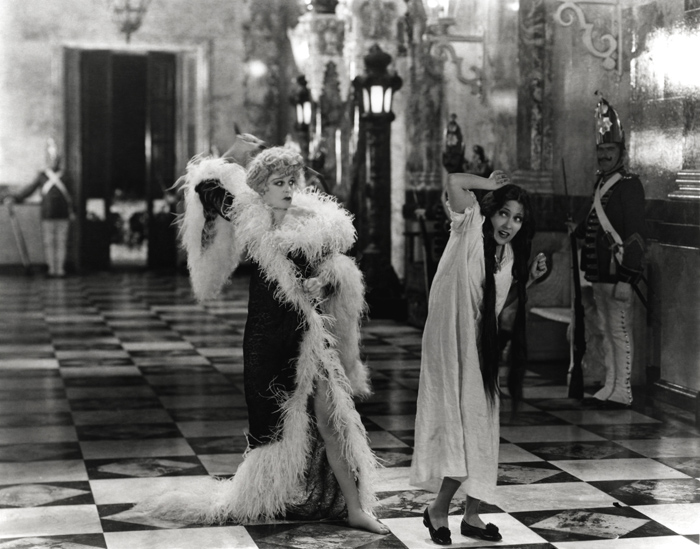
Queen Kelly, L to R, Seena Owen, Gloria Swanson

The film was not released theatrically in the United States, but it was shown in Europe and South America with the 'Swanson ending' added. This was due to a clause in Stroheim's contract.

In 1933, von Stroheim submitted a script called Poto Poto to MGM. Though it was never produced, the script contained several elements recycled from the African story of Queen Kelly. A short extract of the film appears in Sunset Boulevard (1950), representing an old silent picture that Swanson's character, silent movie star Norma Desmond, had made. Von Stroheim is also a primary character in Sunset Boulevard as her former director, former husband, and present butler. By some accounts, von Stroheim suggested the clip be used for its heavy irony. This was the first time viewers in the U.S. saw any footage of the infamous collaboration.

In the 1960s, it was shown on television with the Swanson ending, along with a taped introduction and conclusion in which Swanson talked about the history of the project.

By 1985, Kino International had acquired the rights to the movie and restored two versions: one that uses still photos and subtitles in an attempt to wrap up the storyline, and the other the European "suicide ending" version. Kino remains the rights holder and is responsible for all distribution, including television and home video.

In August 2025, it was announced that a new restoration would be screened as the pre-opening event of the Venice Film Festival. It is reported to consist of a new restoration by Dennis Doros incorporating previously unseen material, and some inventive methods of recreating the film’s grand finale. Doros describes this version as a "reimagining".

== Accolades ==
The film is recognized by American Film Institute in these lists:

- 2002: AFI's 100 Years...100 Passions – Nominated

== See also ==
- Sadie Thompson (1928)
- The Love of Sunya (1927)
