= The Bridge of Sighs (1936 film) =

1936 film by Phil Rosen

- Directed by: Phil Rosen
- Written by: Arthur T. Horman
- Produced by: Maury M. Cohen
- Starring: Onslow Stevens; Dorothy Tree; Jack La Rue
- Cinematography: M.A. Anderson
- Edited by: Ernest J. Nims
- Production company: Invincible Pictures
- Distributed by: Chesterfield Pictures
- Release date: February 15, 1936
- Running time: 66 minutes
- Country: United States
- Language: English

The Bridge of Sighs is a 1936 American crime film directed by Phil Rosen and starring Onslow Stevens, Dorothy Tree and Jack La Rue.

== Cast ==
- Onslow Stevens as Jeffrey 'Jeff' Powell
- Dorothy Tree as Marion Courtney, aka Mary Court
- Jack La Rue as Packy Lacy
- Mary Doran as Evelyn 'Duchess' Thane
- Walter Byron as Arny Norman
- Oscar Apfel as Judge 'Teddy' Blaisdell
- Maidel Turner as Mrs. Blaisdell
- John Kelly as Tommy, the Taxi Driver-Thug
- Paul Fix as Harrison Courtney, Jr. aka Harry West
- Robert Homans as Homicide Capt. P.G. Otheron
- Selmer Jackson as Defense Attorney Alan Adams
- Bryant Washburn as Neselli
- Kathryn Sheldon as Mabel the Maid

== Critical reception ==
Lionel Collier, for the British magazine, Picturegoer, wrote, "A convincing atmosphere and some sound character work helps to make this wholly conventional crime story quite palatable." He added that the early sections of the film were "mechanical" but that it "gains suspense value and culminates in a spectacular climax." He commented that Dorothy Tree gave a performance that is "natural and gives an intelligent rendering of the part, which is quite convincing."

== Bibliography ==
- Norman O. Keim. Our Movie Houses: A History of Film & Cinematic Innovation in Central New York. Syracuse University Press, 2008.
