= Three Wise Girls =

1932 film

- Directed by: William Beaudine
- Written by: Agnes Christine Johnston (adaptation); Robert Riskin (dialogue)
- Based on: Blonde Baby (1931 novel) by Wilson Collison
- Starring: Jean Harlow; Mae Clarke; Walter Byron; Marie Prevost; Andy Devine
- Cinematography: Ted Tetzlaff
- Edited by: Jack Dennis
- Production company: Columbia Pictures
- Distributed by: Columbia Pictures
- Release date: February 9, 1932
- Running time: 66-68 minutes
- Country: United States
- Language: English

Three Wise Girls is a 1932 American pre-Code romantic drama film directed by William Beaudine and featuring Jean Harlow in her first starring role. The supporting cast features a young Andy Devine. This film is preserved in the Library of Congress collection.

== Plot ==
A young small-town woman heads to New York City, whereher two friends and she have romantic troubles.

== Cast ==
- Jean Harlow as Cassie Barnes
- Mae Clarke as Gladys Kane
- Marie Prevost as Dot
- Walter Byron as Jerry Dexter
- Andy Devine as Jimmy Callahan
- Natalie Moorhead as Ruth Dexter
- Jameson Thomas as Arthur Phelps
- Lucy Beaumont as Mrs. Barnes
- Kathrin Clare Ward as Mrs. Kane
- Robert Dudley as Lem
- Marcia Harris as Landlady
- Walter Miller as Manager of Drugstore
- Armand Kaliz as Andre

== Reviews ==
Variety Tuesday, February 9, 1932

"While the title might suggest an effort to adapt 'The Greeks Had a Word for Them,' this is based on a far older foundation which has been used at least once or twice each season for the past several years. Still seems to possess an appeal and stands a chance of reaching further down the line than the more sophisticated yarns because it essays to point a moral."

Variety Tuesday, February 16, 1932

"Jean Harlow has often expressed a longing to play a 'good girl' In pictures, 'Three Wise Girls' (Beacon) grants her wish. In it she's just as good as good can be. But a good girl to picture audiences has to do more than act that way; she's got to look that way. However, it is a physical impossibility for Miss Harlow to assume the straight ascetic outlines which are the basis of virtue; to film audiences, her contours and manner of displaying them will never allow her to sneak into the good girl category no matter how sincerely she longs for it. Mae Clarke, who looks like a good girl and is cast for a bad one, and Marie Prevost, who doesn't aspire for a millionaire, but is happy with a chauffeur and a wedding band, complete the trio of girls laughingly called 'Wise' in this pleasant little yarn's title."
