= City of Play =

1929 British film by Denison Clift

- Directed by: Denison Clift
- Written by: Denison Clift; Angus MacPhail
- Produced by: Michael Balcon
- Starring: Chili Bouchier; Patrick Aherne; James Carew
- Cinematography: Claude L. McDonnell
- Production company: Gainsborough Pictures
- Distributed by: Woolf and Freedman
- Release date: 1 July 1929
- Running time: 80 minutes
- Country: United Kingdom
- Languages: Sound (Part-Talkie); English

City of Play is a 1929 British part-talkie sound drama film directed by Denison Clift and starring Chili Bouchier, Patrick Aherne and Lawson Butt. It was made by Gainsborough Pictures and produced by Michael Balcon. The film featured a few sequences with dialogue and singing while the remaining film used English intertitles along with a musical score and sound effects.

== Cast ==
- Chili Bouchier as Ariel
- Patrick Aherne as Richard von Rolf
- Lawson Butt as Tambourini
- James Carew as Gen. von Rolf
- Harold Huth as Arezzi
- Andrews Engelmann as Colonel von Lessing
- Leila Dresner as Zelah
- Olaf Hytten as Schulz

== See also ==
- List of early sound feature films (1926–1929)

== Bibliography ==
- Low, Rachel. The History of British Film: Volume IV, 1918–1929. Routledge, 1997.
