= Darkness (1923 film) =

1923 British film by George A.Cooper

- Directed by: George A. Cooper
- Written by: Max Brand
- Production company: Quality Plays
- Distributed by: Gaumont British Distributors
- Release date: October 1923
- Country: United Kingdom
- Languages: Silent; English intertitles

Darkness is a 1923 British silent crime film directed by George A. Cooper.

== Cast ==
- Hugh Miller as Keever
- Hilda Sims
- Craig Gordon
- M.A. Wetherell
- Wallace Bosco

== Bibliography ==
- Murphy, Robert. Directors in British and Irish Cinema: A Reference Companion. British Film Institute, 2006.
