= Robert Kenneth Wilson =

British surgeon and gynaecologist

Robert Kenneth Wilson FRCSEd
- Born: 26 January 1899; Madagascar
- Died: 6 June 1969 (aged 70); Melbourne, Australia
- Education: Leighton Park School; University of Cambridge
- Occupations: Surgeon, gynaecologist
- Known for: The 'surgeon's photograph' War service with SOE

Robert Kenneth Wilson MB BChir, FRCSEd (26 January 1899 – 6 June 1969) was a general surgeon and gynaecologist in London, who in 1934 supposedly took a photograph purporting to show the Loch Ness Monster. This became known as "the surgeon's photograph" and was widely regarded as genuine, although scepticism was expressed about this from the start. Analysis and confessions by the perpetrators in the 1990s confirmed that it was an elaborate hoax.

During the Second World War Wilson joined the Special Operations Executive and was parachuted behind enemy lines into German-occupied Europe. For operations in occupied France, he was awarded the Croix de Guerre by the French government and the Order of Orange-Nassau by the Dutch government.

He spent the latter part of his career as a surgeon in Papua New Guinea.

== Early life ==
Robert Kenneth Wilson was born in Madagascar and was the youngest of six children of Dr William Wilson MRCS, LRCP (1857–1909), a Scottish medical missionary and his wife Hannah (née Henderson), who were Quakers. In 1895, the French colonial rulers suppressed a local nationalist uprising. The subsequent unrest led his parents to decide that their youngest son should return to the safety of England, where he was brought up by his elder sister Emeline (1883-1966), who had married William Adlington Cadbury (1867–1957), a member of the wealthy Quaker Cadbury family of industrialists and confectioners.

Wilson went to school at Leighton Park School, Reading. As a schoolboy he took a particular interest in nature and zoology and was later described as "a very good field naturalist who knows all about the British birds and beasts".

He left school at the age of seventeen to join the Royal Artillery, serving on the Western Front in the First World War. He sustained wounds to the left hand and right leg, which left him with a permanent limp, and was subsequently mentioned in despatches.

After the war he won a scholarship to read medicine at Trinity Hall, University of Cambridge, where he joined the University Officer Training Corps (OTC). He completed the clinical part of his medical studies at the London Hospital, qualifying with the Conjoint diploma (MRCS, LRCP) in 1923 and going on to graduate MB BChir in 1925.

== Early surgical career ==
After qualifying he spent three years in junior medical posts at the London Hospital. In 1926 he passed the examinations to become a Fellow of the Royal College of Surgeons of Edinburgh (FRCSEd) and, after three years in general practice, he set up in private practice in Queen Anne Street, London as a general surgeon and gynaecologist.

== Firearms work ==
In 1924 he enlisted in the Territorial Army, initially with the rank of lieutenant, and from 1931 also joined the Royal Army Medical Corps as a Territorial officer, rising to the rank of lieutenant colonel.

By this time he had developed an interest in and knowledge of firearms and was able to supplement his income by appearing in court as an expert witness. Sir Gerard Burrard, author of The Identification of Firearms and Forensic Ballistics, wrote that his "...work on self-loading pistols has placed him in the front rank of authorities on the mechanisms of firearms". In 1943 Wilson published his own textbook on automatic pistols, which was republished in 1990.

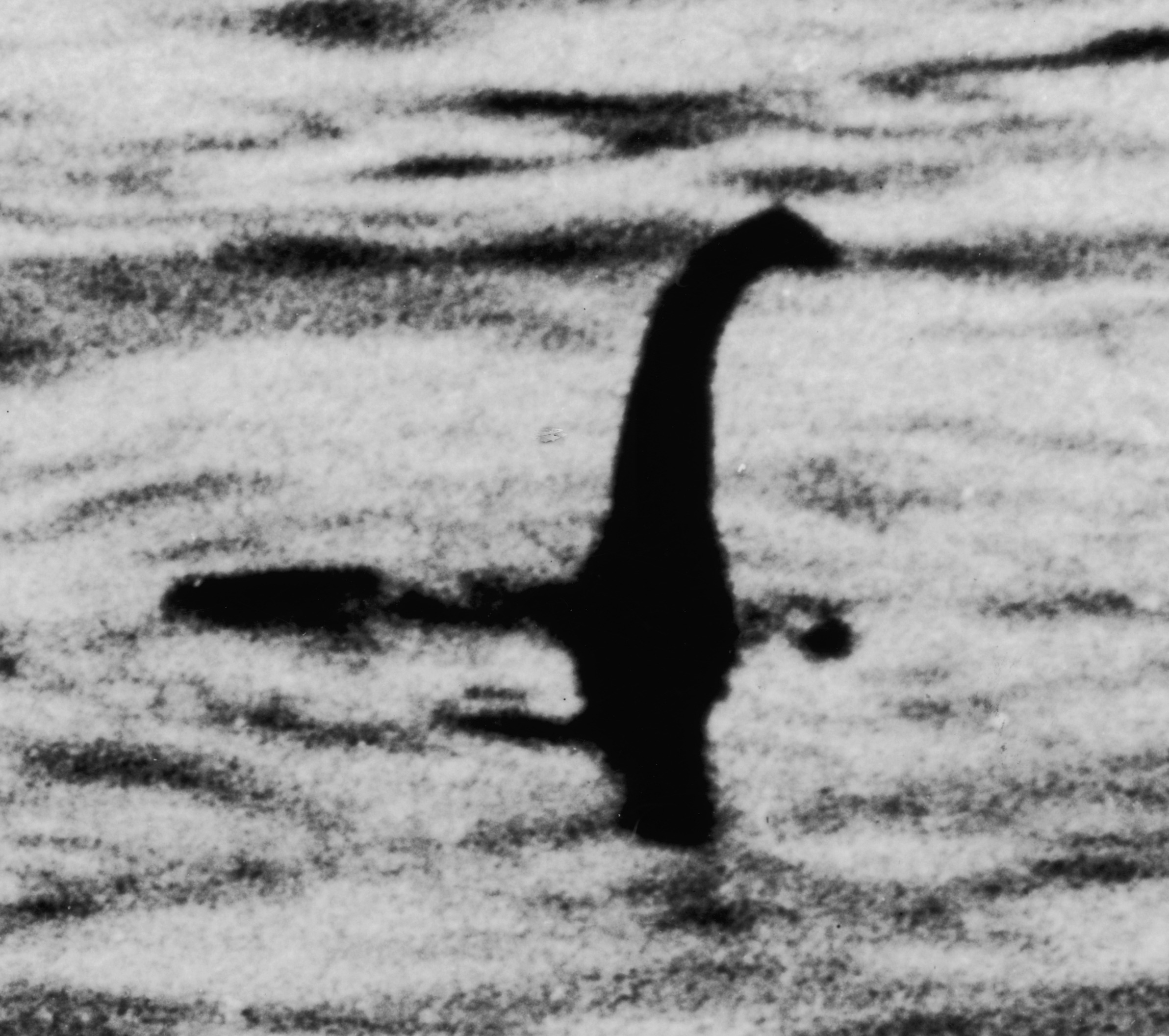
The surgeon's photograph, originally attributed to Wilson but now known to have been an elaborate hoax

== The surgeon's photograph ==
While on a shooting and fishing trip to the north of Scotland in 1934 with a friend, Maurice Chambers, Wilson took photographic plates to Ogston's chemists shop in Inverness to be developed and printed. Two of the prints purported to show the Loch Ness Monster and one was sold to the Daily Mail for £100. This was published in the Daily Mail on 21 April 1934 and became known as 'the surgeon's photograph'. Wilson did not publicise his involvement and tried to exclude his name from the inevitable publicity, yet was fined by the British Medical Association for allowing his name to be associated with the photograph in what was regarded as a breach of professional ethics.

The photograph became the most famous on the subject and was subjected to scientific scrutiny over the ensuing years. Although there were doubts from the outset about its authenticity, no credible explanation about what it depicted was forthcoming until the 1990s. The photo had been taken by Ian Colin Marmaduke Wetherell, the son of M. A. Wetherell, an actor, screenwriter, director, producer, and big-game hunter, and depicted a toy submarine to which had been added a 'head and neck' made of plastic wood. It had been made by Christian Spurling (1904–1993), an artist and sculptor, who corroborated the story in 1993 at the age of ninety. Wilson had been selected by the group as the 'front man' because he enjoyed a practical joke and because his status as a London surgeon might lend credibility to the story.

== Service in World War II ==
On the outbreak of the Second World War in 1939 Wilson closed his London practice and served in the 85th Field Regiment Royal Artillery in Northumberland with the rank of lieutenant colonel. He applied, successfully, to join the Special Operations Executive (SOE).

He took part in Operation Jedburgh which was undertaken by around one hundred three-man teams of special forces soldiers from allied countries, who were trained to work with resistance groups in occupied countries. He led the team codenamed Daniel II whose other members were Lt. Paul Sherrer of the Free French Forces and Sgt. G. W. Mason. To enable him to take an operational role in this clandestine activity he was required to reduce rank to major. In 1944 he was parachuted into occupied France and for this mission he was awarded the Croix de Guerre by the French government. After a second mission into occupied Holland, he was awarded the Order of Orange-Nassau by the government of Holland.

In 1945, units of the SOE were deployed to south-east Asia under South East Asia Command (SEAC) to work alongside Australia's Z Special Unit. Wilson took part in Operation Semut II and was parachuted behind enemy lines in Sarawak, Borneo. He wrote a formal account of the actions of Semut II in the jungle warfare against Japanese forces in Sarawak.

== Post-war career ==
On demobilisation Wilson returned to the UK and set up a fishery on the Solway Firth in southern Scotland where he remained for the next five years. In 1950 he was appointed as medical officer in Papua New Guinea. He served as a surgeon initially in Rabaul and from 1953 in Port Moresby. He retired from surgery in 1956, becoming a medical officer for the Australian Petroleum Company in Port Moresby. He died in Melbourne, Australia on 6 June 1969.

== Family ==
In 1924 in Melbourne Wilson married Gwen Gulliver, daughter of George Ekins Gulliver, a farmer, and his wife Henrietta Maria Gulliver, a noted Australian artist. They had two sons, Richard and Phillip.

== Selected publications ==
- Wilson, R.K. (1943). Textbook of automatic pistols: Being a treatise on the history, development and functioning of the modern military self-loading pistol, its special ammunition, and their evolvement into the sub-machine gun, together with a supplementing chapter on the light machine gun. 1884-1935. Plantersville, S.C: Small-Arms Technical Pub. Co.
- Wilson, R.K. (1957). Chest surgery in New Guinea. Tubercle. 38. 117–122. 10.1016/S0041-3879(57)80006-3.
- Wilson, R.K. (1953). Traumatic rupture of the spleen. The Lancet. 265. 545-6. 10.1016/S0140-6736(53)90278-5.
- Wilson, R.K. (1954). A pancreatic calculus. The Lancet 267(6834):367-8 · 10.1016/S0140-6736(53)90278-5 ·
- Wilson, R.K. & Turner, C. (1957). Appendicitis in Papua. The Medical Journal of Australia. 44. 387-9.
