= Livingstone (film) =

1925 film

Livingstone aka Bula Matari is a 1925 British silent biographical film produced, directed by and starring M.A. Wetherell in the title role. It also starred Molly Rogers and Henry Walton. It depicts the life of the African missionary David Livingstone including his efforts to end slavery and bring education in Africa and his celebrated meeting with Henry Morton Stanley.

== Cast ==
- M.A. Wetherell – David Livingstone
- Molly Rogers – Mary Moffat
- Henry Walton – Henry Morton Stanley
- Reginald Fox – Gordon Bennett
- Douglas Cator – Robert Moffatt
- Simeon Stuart – Neil Livingstone
- Blanche Graham – Queen Victoria
- Douglas Peirce – Livingstone, as a child
