= East of Fifth Avenue =

1933 film directed by Albert S. Rogell

- Directed by: Albert S. Rogell
- Screenplay by: Jo Swerling
- Based on: Brownstone Front by Lew Levenson
- Starring: Wallace Ford; Mary Carlisle; Dorothy Tree
- Cinematography: Benjamin H. Kline
- Edited by: Richard Cahoon
- Production company: Columbia Pictures
- Distributed by: Columbia Pictures
- Release date: November 28, 1933
- Running time: 74 minutes
- Country: United States
- Language: English

East of Fifth Avenue is a 1933 American pre-Code drama film directed by Albert S. Rogell and starring Wallace Ford, Mary Carlisle and Dorothy Tree. It was produced and distributed by Columbia Pictures. The plot revolves around the inhabitants of a cheap New York boarding house.

== Cast ==
- Wallace Ford as Vic Howard
- Mary Carlisle as Edna Howard
- Dorothy Tree as Kitty Green
- Walter Connolly as John Lawton
- Louise Carter as Mrs. Mary Lawton
- Walter Byron as Paul Baxter
- Lucien Littlefield as Gardner
- Harry Holman as Sam Cronin
- Maude Eburne as Mrs. Conway
- Fern Emmett as Lizzie
- Bradley Page as Nick
- Willard Robertson as Dr. Morgan
- Kate Campbell as Miss Smythe
- Eddy Chandler as Tenement Residen
- Dorothy Vernon as Tenement Resident

== Bibliography ==
- Dick, Bernard F. Columbia Pictures: Portrait of a Studio. University Press of Kentucky, 2015.
