= The Peterville Diamond =

- Spanish poster
- Directed by: Walter Forde
- Written by: Brock Williams; Gordon Wellesley
- Based on: Jewel Robbery; 1931 play by Ladislas Fodor
- Produced by: Max Milner
- Starring: Anne Crawford; Donald Stewart; Renée Houston; Oliver Wakefield
- Cinematography: Basil Emmott
- Edited by: Terence Fisher
- Music by: Jack Beaver
- Production company: Warner Bros.
- Distributed by: Warner Bros.
- Release date: 11 January 1943 (UK)
- Running time: 85 minutes
- Country: United Kingdom
- Language: English
- Budget: £62,076
- Box office: £27,740

The Peterville Diamond (also known as Jewel Robbery) is a 1942 British comedy film directed by Walter Forde and starring Anne Crawford, Donald Stewart, and Renée Houston. It was written by Brock Williams and Gordon Wellesley based on the 1931 play Jewel Robbery by Ladislas Fodor, which was previously filmed in Hollywood in 1932.

== Plot ==
To get her businessman husband to listen to her, a wife feigns interest in the famed Peterville Diamond. After a charming thief steals it from her, shenanigans, double-dealing, and finally a chase ensue.

== Cast ==
- Anne Crawford as Teri Mortimer
- Donald Stewart as Charles Mortimer
- Renée Houston as Lady Margaret
- Oliver Wakefield as Baron Redburn
- Charles Heslop as Dilfallow
- William Hartnell as Joseph (as Bill Hartnell)
- Felix Aylmer as President
- Charles Victor as Dan
- Joss Ambler as Police Chief
- Paul Sheridan as Luis
- Jeremy Hawk as Pierre
- Julian Somers as Andre
- Rosamund Greenwood as Miss Geach
- Billy Holland as First Detective Inspector
- Noel Dainton as Second Detective Inspector
- Leo de Pokorny as receptionist

== Production ==
The film was made at Teddington Studios by the British subsidiary of Warner Bros. The film's sets were by resident art director Norman Arnold.

== Critical reception ==
The Monthly Film Bulletin wrote: "An amusing story, well worked out and well made. The acting is very competent without being outstanding, and the humour and the excitement are nicely balanced."

Kine Weekly wrote: "The tale has its moments, but the larder line between slapstick and satire is a little too indefinite to keep the entertainment at concert pitch. Polished technical presentation, an exhilarating grand finale and cast and title values are its happiest assets."

TV Guide gave the film two out of four stars, calling it "An enjoyable light comedy with some witty repartee."

== See also ==
- Jewel Robbery (1932)
