= Victory (1928 film) =

1928 film

- Directed by: M.A. Wetherell
- Written by: Boyd Cable
- Starring: Moore Marriott; Walter Byron; Julie Suedo; Marie Ault
- Cinematography: Freddie Young; Joe Rosenthal
- Production company: Gaumont British
- Distributed by: Woolf & Freedman Film Service
- Release date: March 1928
- Running time: 7 reels
- Country: United Kingdom
- Language: English

Victory is a 1928 British silent war film directed by M.A. Wetherell and starring Moore Marriott, Walter Byron and Julie Suedo. It began filming in October 1927 and was released in March the following year. It was made at Isleworth Studios.

== Main cast ==
- Moore Marriott as Seth Lee
- Walter Byron as Major King
- Julie Suedo as Marie Dulac
- Marie Ault as Mother
- Griffith Humphreys as General Van Doorn
- Douglas Herald as Captain Wein
- Marjorie Gaffney as Julie
- Victor Maxim Moorkins as Pierre

== Bibliography ==
- Low, Rachael. History of the British Film, 1918-1929. George Allen & Unwin, 1971.
- Wood, Linda. British Films 1927-1939. British Film Institute, 1986.
