= Jewel Robbery =

1932 film

- Theatrical release poster
- Directed by: William Dieterle
- Screenplay by: Erwin S. Gelsey
- Based on: Ekszerrablás a Váci-uccában; 1931 play by Ladislas Fodor; Bertram Bloch (1931 English adaptation)
- Starring: William Powell; Kay Francis
- Cinematography: Robert Kurrle
- Edited by: Ralph Dawson
- Music by: Bernhard Kaun; Leo F. Forbstein
- Distributed by: Warner Bros. Pictures
- Release date: August 13, 1932
- Running time: 70 minutes
- Country: United States
- Language: English
- Budget: $291,039

Jewel Robbery is a 1932 American pre-Code romantic comedy heist film, directed by William Dieterle and starring William Powell and Kay Francis. It is based on the 1931 Hungarian play Ékszerrablás a Váci-utcában by Ladislas Fodor and its subsequent English adaptation, Jewel Robbery by Bertram Bloch.

== Plot ==
Viennese Baroness Teri von Horhenfels relieves the boredom of her marriage to her rich but dull older husband with love affairs. One day, she meets both her husband and a current lover, Paul, at an exclusive jewel shop, where the baron is to buy her an extravagant, 28-carat (5.6 g) diamond ring. While the shop owner and he retire to haggle over price, her tedium is lifted by the arrival of a suave jewel thief and his gang. In turn, he is entranced by her beauty and uninhibited, even cheeky, personality. He locks her husband and Paul, a young cabinet minister of whom she has already tired, in the vault and forces shop owner Hollander to smoke a marijuana-laced cigarette that soon makes him forget his troubles. She persuades the thief to leave her free, though, but not before he takes her ring.

After misdirecting the police, Teri returns home, envied of her adventure by her equally bored but less reckless friend Marianne. A vase of flowers appears in the house, but the housekeeper says no delivery was made. Teri surmises that the jewel thief has visited. Marianne and she go upstairs to discover her safe has been cracked. Initially outraged, they discover that nothing has been taken and Teri's ring has been returned. Marianne departs hastily, anxious to avoid becoming entangled in a potential scandal. The thief then enters through the window and informs Teri that the diamonds taken from the jewel shop are hidden in the safe. He explains it is the safest place to hide them, but a flustered Teri tries to make him take the ring, since she would be considered an accomplice if it were returned to her. When he refuses to take it back, she accuses him of using her to hide out from the police. Police detective Fritz arrives, flushes out the robber, and takes the two into custody.

The arrest, though, is staged; Fritz is a member of the gang. The thief had used the fake arrest to transport Teri to his house without protest for a night of romance. She is intrigued. Instead of plunging into sex, she insists on being wooed. He shows her safe upon safe of jewels from previous heists. Aware Vienna has become too hot for him, he asks her to meet him in Nice, but she hesitates. Just then, the real police arrive and storm the place. He ties Teri up to divert suspicion from her, then flees. Pretending to be terrified, she calls for help. After being untied and giving a false description of the thief, she announces that she needs a vacation to recover from all the excitement and will take the first train to Nice. She winks at the camera.

== Cast ==
- William Powell as The Robber
- Kay Francis as Baroness Teri
- Helen Vinson as Marianne
- Hardie Albright as Paul
- Alan Mowbray as Detective Fritz
- Andre Luguet as Count Andre
- Henry Kolker as Baron Franz
- Spencer Charters as Lenz
- Lee Kohlmar as Hollander
- Clarence Wilson as Prefect of Police

== Production ==
The film marked the fifth of seven to pair William Powell and Kay Francis. Powell, who had recently married Carole Lombard, initially did not want to appear in the film, but he eventually accepted the role because he considered it amusing.

== Response ==
In a contemporary review for The New York Times, critic Andre Sennwald wrote: "All this is nervous, brittle comedy of a sort that is sufficiently novel in the films to be stimulating. Miss Francis interprets the countess as if she were giving an imitation of an imitation, and her performance is one in which her usual intelligence and sincerity are strangely absent. An excellent subsidiary cast has been assembled, and William Dieterle's direction has the proper daintiness and wit."

== See also ==
- The Peterville Diamond (1942)
