= Come Into My Parlour =

1932 British film by John Longden

- Directed by: John Longden
- Written by: Jean Jay; John Longden
- Produced by: A.J. Marks; Kenneth McLaglen
- Starring: Patrick Aherne; Renée Houston; Hal Walters
- Production company: G.E.M. Productions
- Distributed by: Metro-Goldwyn-Mayer
- Release date: 29 March 1932
- Running time: 45 minutes
- Country: United Kingdom
- Language: English

Come Into My Parlour is a 1932 British crime film directed by John Longden and starring Patrick Aherne, Renée Houston and Hal Walters. It was written by Jean Jay and Longden. The title is taken from the poem The Spider and the Fly by Mary Howitt. It was produced at Ludwig Blattner's Elstree Studios outside London as a quota quickie for distribution by MGM. It was the only directorial effort of John Longden, better known as an actor.

== Preservation status ==
The British Film Institute National Archive holds no stills or ephemera, and no film or video materials.

== Synopsis ==
Jenny MacDonald is young manicurist in love with barber's assistant Gerry. Noticing the attentions Jenny is receiving from a wealthy customer, Gerry becomes jealous. He sees them meet in a hotel and goes to the room to confront them, but instead finds a ransacked room and the burglar still at large. After they struggle, the burglar falls out of the window. Thinking he has killed him, Gerry panics and vanishes, leaving Jenny heartbroken at his unexplained disappearance. When she finally finds him, working on a Thames-side wharf, she tells him that the burglar was not killed.

== Cast ==
- Renée Houston as Jenny MacDonald
- Patrick Aherne as Gerry
- Robert Holmes as Julius Markham
- Hal Walters as the burglar
- Fanny Wright as Mrs. MacDonald

== Reception ==
Kine Weekly wrote: "The presence of one of the popular Houston Sisters in the cast is this film's main asset. It is not lacking in ideas, but on the whole, they are carried out in an almost amateurish manner. .. John Longdon has had several bright ideas in this whimsical comedy, but he has failed to exploit them well. The whole thing is too slow, and, in an effort to avoid too much dialogue, he has gone to the other extreme and made one feel that the picture is only partly a talkie."

The Daily Film Renter wrote: "Quality indifferent, dialogue crude, interest lukewarm. Generally poor British production which it is difficult to value."
