= Maurice Stonefrost =

British local government officer

Maurice Frank Stonefrost CBE (September 1, 1927 – October 25, 2008) was a British civil servant. He was most prominent for his involvement with the Greater London Council (GLC) from 1973 until its dissolution in 1986.

== Background ==
Stonefrost was born in Bristol and attended Merrywood Grammar School. He did National Service with the RAF from 1948 to 1951. After that he worked for several local authorities, starting in Bristol before moving to Slough in 1954, Coventry in 1956, and West Sussex in 1961. From 1964 to 1973 he worked as the secretary for the Institute of Municipal Treasurers and Accountants.

== Greater London Council ==
From 1973 to 1977 he worked with the Labour administration under Sir Reg Goodwin to keep London out of the financial problems that plagued New York City. From 1977 to 1981 he managed the finances for the GLC under the Conservative administration led by Horace Cutler.

He achieved his greatest prominence under the Labour administration that began in 1981 under Ken Livingstone by allowing the city government to pursue its political goals within a feasible budget. Additionally, he was able to get his officials to manipulate the central government's local financing scheme to obtain £200m of additional financing from other governmental agencies. He also argued strongly against the dissolution of the GLC because of the resulting "fragmentation and chaos" that would result for the other London governmental agencies and the increased cost of borrowing money for each of those agencies.

== After the Greater London Council ==
After the GLC was dissolved in 1986 he led an investigation into the Liverpool City Council's near bankruptcy and recommended stabilizing its finances by halting hiring, raising rents and tax rates, and reorganizing its debt obligations. From 1986 to 1990 he was Chief Executive Officer of the British Rail Pension Fund (BRPF). He was involved with the sale of a collection of fine art owned by the BRPF after fine art prices rose in the 1980s. Although Labour Party Shadow Arts Minister Mark Fisher objected to the possibility that the collection might leave Britain, Stonefrost maintained the most important outcome was receiving the highest price for the works.

From 1990 to 1993 he was chairman of Municipal Mutual Insurance (MMI). MMI had been a primary insurer of local governments in Britain but had expanded to also insure cars and homes. When he joined, MMI had become overexposed to problems relating to school arson attacks and general financial market problems and he engineered a sale to Zurich Insurance in 1993.
