= Exposure (1932 film) =

1932 film

- Directed by: Norman Houston
- Written by: Norman Houston
- Produced by: Sigmund Neufeld; Morris R. Schlank
- Starring: Lila Lee; Walter Byron; Tully Marshall
- Cinematography: Harry Forbes
- Edited by: Irving Birnbaum
- Production company: Tower Productions
- Distributed by: Capitol Film Exchange
- Release date: August 20, 1932
- Running time: 71 minutes
- Country: United States
- Language: English

Exposure is a 1932 American drama film directed by Norman Houston and starring Lila Lee, Walter Byron and Tully Marshall.

== Cast ==
- Lila Lee as Doris Corbin
- Walter Byron as Andy Bryant
- Tully Marshall as John Ward
- Mary Doran as Gerry Ward
- Bryant Washburn as Jimmy Delane
- Pat O'Malley as Van Avery - City Editor
- Lee Moran as Nosey Newton
- Spec O'Donnell as Inky
- Nat Pendleton as Maniac Killer

== Bibliography ==
- Pitts, Michael R. Poverty Row Studios, 1929–1940: An Illustrated History of 55 Independent Film Companies, with a Filmography for Each. McFarland & Company, 2005.
