= Adolf Tandler =

American orchestral conductor

Adolf Tandler, also Adolph, (born November 2, 1875, in Vienna) was a conductor of the Los Angeles Symphony Orchestra, which predated the Los Angeles Philharmonic.

1917 Jan 5 Los Angeles Evening Express ad for world premiere of The Play of Everyman with music conducted by Tandler

Tandler moved to Los Angeles in 1908, and from November 1913 to 1920 led the symphony orchestra, after which it dissolved. He then transitioned to composing film scores, with credits for Scarface and Queen Kelly. He died (suicide by vehicle exhaust) with his daughter, crippled with arthritis since she was 14 years old, on September 30, 1953, in the Eagle Rock, Los Angeles area.
