= Donald Stewart (actor) =

American actor (1910–1966)

- in The Peterville Diamond (1942)
- Born: May 14, 1910; Wilkes-Barre, Pennsylvania, United States
- Died: March 1, 1966 (aged 55); Chertsey, Surrey, England
- Other name: Donald Stewart Wintermute
- Occupations: Actor, singer
- Years active: 1930–1963
- Spouse: Renée Houston

Donald Stewart (May 14, 1910 – March 1, 1966) was an American actor and singer, who settled and worked in the United Kingdom. After training at the American Academy of Dramatic Arts and several appearances in Broadway musicals (including Life Begins at 8:40), Stewart moved to Britain. He performed in revue, and became a leading man in several British films of the 1940s including The Peterville Diamond (1942) and One Exciting Night (1944). During the 1950s he appeared in character roles in films and increasingly on television. He was married to the actress Renée Houston, whom he met filming Fine Feathers (1937).

== Selected filmography ==
=== Film ===
- Soft Lights and Sweet Music (1936)
- Flying Fortress (1942)
- The Peterville Diamond (1942)
- One Exciting Night (1944)
- Welcome, Mr. Washington (1944)
- I'll Get You for This (1951)
- Tiger by the Tail (1955)
- Reluctant Bride (1955)
- Ramsbottom Rides Again (1956)
- The Sheriff of Fractured Jaw (1958)

=== Television ===
- O.S.S. (1957)
- The Vise (1959)
- Interpol Calling (1959)
- International Detective (1960)
- The World of Tim Frazer (1960)
- Boyd Q.C. (1961)
- A for Andromeda (1961)
- Man of the World (1962)
- The Sentimental Agent (1963)

== Bibliography ==
- Goble, Alan. The Complete Index to Literary Sources in Film. Walter de Gruyter, 1999. ISBN 9783598114922
