= Dorothy Tree =

American actress

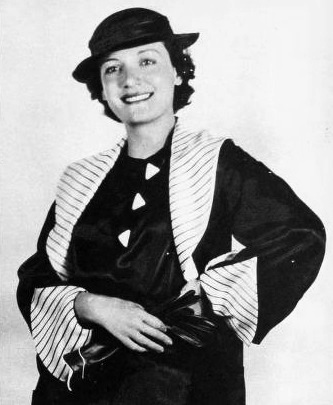
- Tree in 1933
- Born: Dorothy Estelle Triebitz; May 21, 1906; Brooklyn, New York, U.S.
- Died: February 13, 1992 (aged 85); Englewood, New Jersey, U.S.
- Other name: Dorothy Uris
- Occupations: Actress, voice teacher
- Years active: 1927–1951
- Spouse: Michael Uris (m. 1928; died 1967)
- Children: 1

Dorothy Tree (born Dorothy Estelle Triebitz, May 21, 1906 – February 13, 1992) was an American actress, voice teacher and writer. She appeared in a wide range of character roles in at least 49 films between 1927 and 1951.

Today's audiences may recognize her as Martha, mother of Knute Rockne in Knute Rockne, All American, and May Emmerich, the invalid wife of Louis Calhern in The Asphalt Jungle. After being blacklisted as a communist because of the House Un-American Activities Committee (HUAC) hearings, she began a second career as a voice teacher in New York. Emphasizing good diction and clarity, and the subtleties of intonation, she published four books on the subject.

== Early life and stage career ==
She was born in Brooklyn, New York, the eldest of three daughters of Herman Triebitz (1877–1943) and Bertha Hert (1885–1967). Her sisters were Sylvia Triebitz (1911–1949) and Mildred "Mimi" Triebitz (1918–?) Her parents were born in Austria, and immigrated to the United States. Their native language was Yiddish. He was the proprietor of a shoe store in Brooklyn, and later sold shoes wholesale.

Tree attended Cornell University, leaving after two years to pursue a career. Taking the stage name Dorothy Tree, she began her acting career on the stage in 1926. Tree's Broadway credits include Bright Honor (1936), Clear All Wires (1932), The Merchant of Venice (1930), Holiday (1928), The Marquise (1927), and The Triumphant Bachelor (1927).

== Film career ==
Tree made her motion picture debut (uncredited) playing a department store employee in the Famous Players–Lasky/Paramount Pictures silent era romantic comedy It (1927) starring Clara Bow and Antonio Moreno. Tree next played a wife of Bela Lugosi's Dracula (1931); she also played a bride of Dracula in the Spanish language version of the same title, which was shot at night with a different cast using the same sets at Universal.

Dorothy Tree, 1939

Tree attracted attention as a feminine menace on the screen as the hairdresser-spy, Hilda Kleinhauer, in the Warner Bros. drama Confessions of a Nazi Spy (1939) starring Edward G. Robinson, which won the National Board of Review Award for Best Film – English Language. Her performance immediately won her the role as Reni Vonich, head of a spy ring attempting to steal the latest in technology, in Paramount's sci-fi drama Television Spy (1939). She was signed by RKO to portray the important role as Elizabeth Edwards, Mary Todd's sister, in Abe Lincoln in Illinois (1940) starring Raymond Massey.

She portrayed Martha Rockne in the Warners biopic Knute Rockne, All American, the mother of the famous football coach played by Pat O'Brien. In MGM's film noir crime/drama The Asphalt Jungle Tree played May Emmerich, a bedridden woman who is the very ingenuous and frustrated wife of Alonzo Emmerich (played by Louis Calhern), a crooked lawyer and double-crosser who, although he truly loves May, is having an adulterous affair with the character played by Marilyn Monroe.

Tree also appeared as Aunt Martha Dale in a teleplay of the live television anthology series The Silver Theatre (1950), which was titled Minor Incident. Her last role on the theater screen was as Marie Elsner in Columbia's crime/drama The Family Secret (1951) starring John Derek and Lee J. Cobb.

== Blacklist and new career ==
In 1952, Tree and her husband, Michael Uris, were branded as communists and blacklisted due to the HUAC testimony of playwright/screenwriter Bernard C. Schoenfeld.

She then began a second career teaching voice and diction in New York. She specialized in singing in English at the Metropolitan Opera and the Mannes College of Music, and also taught at the Manhattan School of Music, using her married name, Dorothy Uris. She was quoted as saying, "I left Dorothy Tree in Hollywood."

On November 4, 1956, an article written by Uris about English singing with good diction and its aiding a singer to clarify words for the listener was published in the New York Times. She published four books, Everybody's Book of Better Speaking (1960); To Sing in English, a Guide to Improved Diction (1971); A Woman's Voice: A Handbook to Successful Private and Public Speaking (1975); and Say it Again: Dorothy Uris' Personal Collection of Quotes, Comment & Anecdotes (1979).

Dorothy Tree Uris died at age 85 of heart failure at the Actors Fund of America Nursing Home in Englewood, New Jersey.

== Personal life ==
She married on June 8, 1928, in Manhattan, New York, screenwriter and story editor Michael Uris (March 25, 1902 – July 17, 1967). They had one son, Joseph M. Uris (born October 25, 1943).

== Filmography ==
Year	Title	Genre	Role	Notes
1927	It	romantic comedy	Waltham employee	Uncredited
1931	Dracula	fantasy / horror	Dracula's wife	English-language version; Uncredited
1931	Drácula	fantasy / horror	Bride of Dracula (in catacombs)	Spanish-language version; Uncredited
1932	Life Begins	drama	Rita	Uncredited
1933	East of Fifth Avenue	drama	Kitty Green	
1934	Madame Du Barry	historical drama	Adelaide	
1934	Side Streets	drama	Ilka	
1934	Here Comes the Navy	romantic comedy	Gladys	
1934	Friends of Mr. Sweeney	comedy	Countess Olga Andrei Misitalsky	
1934	The Dragon Murder Case	crime / mystery	Ruby Steele	
1934	The Case of the Howling Dog	crime / mystery	Lucy Benton	
1934	The Firebird	murder mystery	Mrs. Jolan Brandt	
1935	The Woman in Red	drama	Mrs. Olga Goodyear	
1935	A Night at the Ritz	comedy	Kiki Lorraine	
1935	While the Patient Slept	murder mystery / comedy	Mittie Federie	
1935	Four Hours to Kill!	drama	Mae Danish	
1936	The Bridge of Spies	crime thrillers	Marion Courtney	
1936	Three Godfathers	western	Blackie Winter	
1936	Navy Born	drama / romance	Daphne Roth	
1937	Marked Woman	crime / drama	woman in raid	Uncredited
1937	The Great Garrick	romantic comedy	Mme. Moreau	
1938	Having Wonderful Time	romantic comedy	Frances	
1938	Storm Over Bengal	adventure	Mrs. Massarene	
1938	Trade Winds	comedy	Clara	Uncredited
1938	Zaza	drama	Madame Dufresne	
1939	The Mysterious Miss X	comedy	Alma Platt	
1939	Cafe Society	romantic comedy	Lady Photographer	Uncredited
1939	The Mystery of Mr. Wong	mystery	Valerie Edwards	
1939	Confessions of a Nazi Spy	drama	Hilda Kleinhauer	
1939	Television Spy	science fiction / drama	Reni Vonich	
1939	Charlie Chan in City in Darkness	mystery	Charlotte Ronnell	
1940	Abe Lincoln in Illinois	biopic / drama	Elizabeth Edwards	
1940	Little Orvie	comedy	Clara Stone	
1940	Sky Murder	comedy / drama	Kathe	
1940	Knute Rockne, All American	biopic / sports	Martha Rockne	
1941	The Man Who Lost Himself	comedy	Mrs. Van Avery	
1941	Singapore Woman	drama	Mrs. Bennett	
1941	Highway West	drama	Salvo's Moll	
1942	Nazi Agent	drama	Miss Harper	
1942	Hitler – Dead or Alive	drama	Else von Brandt	
1943	Edge of Darkness	war / drama	Solveig Brategaard	Uncredited
1943	Crime Doctor	crime / drama	Pearl Adams	Uncredited
1944	Casanova Brown	comedy	Nurse Clark	
1950	No Sad Songs for Me	drama	Frieda Miles	
1950	The Asphalt Jungle	crime / drama	May Emmerich	
1950	The Men	drama	Harriet (Ellen's mother)	
1950	A Life of Her Own	drama	Caraway's secretary	Uncredited
1951	The Family Secret	crime / drama	Marie Elsner	
