= Blighty (film) =

1927 British film by Adrian Brunel

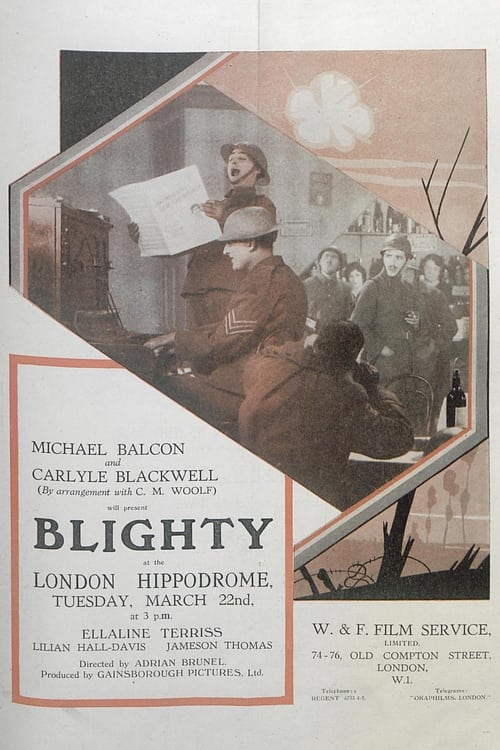
- Directed by: Adrian Brunel
- Written by: Eliot Stannard; Ivor Montagu
- Produced by: Michael Balcon; Carlyle Blackwell
- Starring: Ellaline Terriss; Lillian Hall-Davis; Jameson Thomas
- Cinematography: Jack E. Cox
- Production company: Gainsborough Pictures
- Distributed by: Woolf & Freedman Film Service
- Release date: March 1927
- Running time: 8397 feet
- Country: United Kingdom

Blighty is a 1927 British World War I silent drama film directed by Adrian Brunel and starring Ellaline Terriss, Lillian Hall-Davis and Jameson Thomas. The film was a Gainsborough Pictures production with screenplay by Eliot Stannard from a story by Ivor Montagu.

Michael Balcon wrote "Though the story was simple, it touched on patterns of behaviour at the time: the attitude to the war, the realisation that the outbreak of the First World War was the end of an era, and more, perhaps most, important, it suggested the breaking down of class barriers, a process which has been continued very slowly from that time".

== Plot ==
With the outbreak of World War I, Sir Francis and Lady Villiers and daughter Ann watch son of the household Robin and family chauffeur David Marshall go off to fight. David does well in the army and is quickly promoted through the ranks, while Robin falls in love with and marries a local girl. Robin is killed in action on the Western Front, leaving his bride a young widow with a baby.

When David returns periodically to England on leave, he and Ann fall in love. Meanwhile Robin's wife finds her way as a refugee to England to seek out the Villiers and introduce them to their grandchild. Following the declaration of the Armistice with Germany, the romance between David and Ann has to conquer entrenched class-based attitudes, while Robin's wife at first feels overwhelmed and out-of-place in the Villiers household. Problems are eventually overcome, and the Villiers' welcome David and their daughter-in-law and grandchild into the family.

== Cast ==
- Ellaline Terriss as Lady Villiers
- Lillian Hall-Davis as Ann Villiers
- Jameson Thomas as David Marshall
- Godfrey Winn as Robin Villiers
- Nadia Sibirskaïa as The Little Refugee
- Annesley Healey as Sir Francis Villiers
- Wally Patch as Drill Sergeant
- Dino Galvani as Poilou
- Renée Houston as Typist
- Billie Houston as Typist

== Background ==
Blighty was Brunel's second feature-length directorial assignment, four years after The Man Without Desire. He had spent the intervening years making a series of satirical burlesque short films, the first few of which had impressed Michael Balcon who offered him the opportunity to produce and distribute further examples through Gainsborough. In 1926 Balcon gave Brunel the chance to direct a full-length feature for Gainsborough and Blighty was the result. Although Brunel was initially said to be in two minds about directing a "war film" as he did not care for the genre on moral or aesthetic grounds, he agreed to go ahead with the proviso that there would be no material directly depicting the conflict, nor any appeal to jingoistic sentiment.
