= Grotrian Hall =

Defunct London concert venue

Coordinates: 51.5154°N 0.1531°W

Grotrian Hall was a London concert venue from 1925 until 1938, located at 15 Seymour Street, Portman Square, London. The site is now covered by an office block backing on to Edwards Mews, behind Selfridges.

Originally the lecture theatre of the Marylebone Literary and Scientific Institution (1833–1869) and then the home of the Quebec Institute (1870–1878), the hall became synonymous with music concerts when it was acquired in 1878 by the American piano makers Steinway, as their first Steinway Hall in London.

The Steinway Hall was then transformed in 1925 for the piano makers Grotrian-Steinweg and the hall acquired its new name The Grotrian Hall, until its closure in 1938 when it was bought by Gordon Selfridge to extend the Selfridge's store. The Hall heard Rachmaninoff give the first English performances of his Prelude in C-sharp minor and one of Grieg's last performances was at the Grotrian Hall.
