= The Silver Lining (1927 film) =

1927 film directed by Thomas Bentley

- Directed by: Thomas Bentley
- Starring: Marie Ault; Patrick Aherne; John F. Hamilton; Eve Gray
- Production company: British International Pictures
- Distributed by: Wardour Films
- Release date: 1927
- Country: United Kingdom
- Language: English

The Silver Lining is a 1927 British silent drama film directed by Thomas Bentley and starring Marie Ault, Patrick Aherne and Moore Marriott. The screenplay concerns two brothers who fight over a girl, leading one to frame the other for robbery. Later, guilt-ridden, he confesses and arranges his own death.

== Cast ==
- Marie Ault – Mrs. Hurst
- Patrick Aherne – Thomas 'Tom' Hurst
- John Hamilton – John Hurst
- Eve Gray – Lettie Deans
- Sydney Fairbrother – Mrs. Akers
- Moore Marriott – Gypsy
- Cameron Carr – Constable
- Hazel Wiles – Mrs. Deans
- Bernard Vaughan – Vicar
