= Colin Brittan =

English footballer (1927–2013)

Personal information
- Date of birth: 2 June 1927
- Place of birth: Bristol, England
- Date of death: 4 April 2013 (aged 85)
- Place of death: Bristol, England
- Position: Wing half

Senior career*
| Years | Team | Apps | (Gls) |
| –1950 | Bristol North Old Boys | | |
| 1950–1957 | Tottenham Hotspur | 41 | (1) |
| 1957– | Bedford Town | | |
- * Club domestic league appearances and goals

Colin Brittan (2 June 1927 – 4 April 2013) was an English professional footballer who played for Bristol North Old Boys, Tottenham Hotspur and Bedford Town.

== Playing career ==
Brittan began his career with non-League club Bristol North Old Boys before joining Tottenham Hotspur in October, 1948. The wing half played a significant part in the push and run championship winning team of 1950-51 when he notched up eight appearances. Brittan played in a total of 45 matches in all competitions and scored once between 1950–57 at White Hart Lane.

== Honours ==
Tottenham Hotspur

Football League First Division Winners: 1950–51
