= Pat Aherne =

English actor (1901–1970)

- Born: Patrick de Lacy Aherne; 6 January 1901; King's Norton, Worcestershire, England
- Died: 30 September 1970 (aged 69); Woodland Hills, Los Angeles, United States
- Occupation: Film actor
- Years active: 1924–1957
- Spouse: Renée Houston

Patrick de Lacy Aherne (6 January 1901 – 30 September 1970) was an English film actor. He was the son of the architect William de Lacy Aherne, and the elder brother of the actor Brian Aherne. The family lived at Kings Norton.

He was married to actress/comedian Renée Houston, with whom he adopted two children (Teri and Trevor) and had two children (Patrick Anthony and Alan Brian). Pat Aherne was a silent screen leading man, who was reduced to playing minor supporting roles after the transition to sound (due to hearing loss). His most notable on-screen appearances after 1930, were in Green Dolphin Street, Rocketship X-M and The Court Jester. He was a champion boxer and was in the first boxing film ever made. Pat was also a motorcycle trick rider and friend of Harley and Davidson.

Following death he donated his body to science.

== Selected filmography ==
- The Cost of Beauty (1924)
- The Ball of Fortune (1926)
- Blinkeyes (1926) – The Basher
- Thou Fool (1926) – Minor Role
- The Silver Lining (1927) – Thomas 'Tom' Hurst
- Carry On (1927) – Bob Halliday
- A Daughter in Revolt (1927) – Jackie the Climber
- Huntingtower (1927) – Capt. John Heritage
- Virginia's Husband (1928) – Bill Hemingway
- Love's Option (1928) – John Dacre
- The Inseparables (1929) – Laurie Weston
- Auld Lang Syne (1929) – Angus McTavish
- City of Play (1929) – Richard von Rolf
- Bindle (1931)
- Come Into My Parlour (1932) – Gerry
- The Pride of the Force (1933) – Max Heinrich
- My Old Duchess (1934) – Gaston
- The Outcast (1934) – Burke
- The Return of Bulldog Drummond (1934) – Jerry Seymour
- Falling in Love (1934) – Dick Turner
- Polly's Two Fathers (1936, Short) – Fred
- The Stoker (1937) – Russell Gilham
- Q Planes (1939) – Officer (uncredited)
- Ask a Policeman (1939) – Motorist (uncredited)
- Thursday's Child (1943) – Lance Sheridan (uncredited)
- Warn That Man (1943) – Mellows
- Dead of Night (1945) – Doctor at Psychiatric Hospital (segment "The Ventriloquist's Dummy") (uncredited)
- Singapore (1947) – British Officer (uncredited)
- Green Dolphin Street (1947) – Kapua-Manga
- Forever Amber (1947) – Abram (uncredited)
- The Paradine Case (1947) – Police Sgt. Leggett (uncredited)
- If Winter Comes (1947) – Garnet (uncredited)
- A Woman's Vengeance (1948) – Warder (uncredited)
- The Challenge (1948) – Jerome Roberts
- Rocketship X-M (1950) – Reporter #1
- Rogues of Sherwood Forest (1950) – Trooper (uncredited)
- Kim (1950) – General's Aide (uncredited)
- Soldiers Three (1951) – Soldier (uncredited)
- Lorna Doone (1951) – Judge Jeffries (uncredited)
- The Day the Earth Stood Still (1951) – General at Pentagon (uncredited)
- The Son of Dr. Jekyll (1951) – Tenement Landlord (uncredited)
- Bwana Devil (1952) – Latham
- Botany Bay (1952) – Bo's'n's Mate (uncredited)
- Rogue's March (1953) – Maj. Wensley
- Titanic (1953) – Seaman (uncredited)
- The Desert Rats (1953) – English Officer (uncredited)
- The Royal African Rifles (1953) – Capt. Curtis
- Knock on Wood (1954) – Reporter (uncredited)
- The Silver Chalice (1954) – Soldier in Chase (uncredited)
- The Court Jester (1955) – Sir Pertwee
- The Man Who Knew Too Much (1956) – Handyman (uncredited)
- Witness for the Prosecution (1957) – Court Officer (uncredited) (final film role)
