= His Wife's Husband (1922 British film) =

1922 film

- Directed by: George A. Cooper
- Written by: Adrian Johnson
- Starring: Madge Stuart; Olaf Hytten; M.A. Wetherell
- Production company: Quality Plays
- Distributed by: Walturdaw
- Release date: December 1922
- Country: United Kingdom
- Language: Silent (English intertitles)

His Wife's Husband is a 1922 British silent crime film directed by George A. Cooper and starring Madge Stuart, Olaf Hytten, and M.A. Wetherell.

== Cast ==
- Madge Stuart as Madge Pearson
- Olaf Hytten as Fred Pearson
- M.A. Wetherell as Edgar Armstrong
- Ralph Forster as Butler

== Bibliography ==
- Murphy, Robert. Directors in British and Irish Cinema: A Reference Companion. British Film Institute, 2006.
