= The Somme (film) =

1927 film

- Directed by: M. A. Wetherell
- Written by: Geoffrey Barkas; Boyd Cable
- Produced by: E. Gordon Craig
- Cinematography: Sydney Blythe ` Freddie Young
- Edited by: Geoffrey Barkas
- Production company: New Era Films
- Distributed by: New Era Films
- Release date: September 1927
- Running time: 80 mins (8,100 feet)
- Country: United Kingdom
- Language: English

The Somme is a 1927 British documentary film directed by M. A. Wetherell. It re-examined the 1916 Battle of the Somme during the First World War.

== Production ==
The film was made at Isleworth Studios using a docudrama format. It involved a number of the personnel who had previously worked on a successful series of documentary reconstructions of First World War battles by British Instructional Films released between 1921 and 1927. British Instructional Films had finished their series with The Battles of Coronel and Falkland Islands, and Geoffrey Barkas moved to the newly established New Era films to carry on the cycle. When Barkas fell ill, Wetherell was brought in to take over the project. Although Wetherell received the directors credit, much of the film was made by Barkas and Boyd Cable.

Toronto ads touted that the Imperial Army Museum provided the footage; its actual name is the Imperial War Museum.

The following year the company released another docudrama, Q-Ships.

== Release ==
Toronto, Ontario theatre Tivoli hosted the first Canadian showing, with hundreds of people being "turned away" from the theatre daily.

== Critical reception ==
A "press agent" for the film told The Toronto Daily Star that it was a "masterpiece of British pictures".

[M]ere words fail utterly to describe even one scene of this mighty picture taken from the battlefields of France. Judging by the excitement and enthuasiasm created in its first Canadian showing, The Somme will undoubtedly duplicate its effect every time it is thrown on the screen. The Somme is more than a war picture. It deals with humanity in the war, the bitter and the sweet, the fineness and the hellishness, the friendliness and the hate. It is utterly free from hokum, but full of sentiment. If you are a red-blooded Britisher, you will not want to miss The Somme. It is something superb in motion pictures.

== Bibliography ==
- Low, Rachael (1971). History of the British Film, 1918–1929. George Allen & Unwin.
- Wood, Linda (1986). British Films 1927–1939. British Film Institute.
