= Municipal Mutual Insurance =

Municipal Mutual Insurance (MMI) is an insurance company registered in the United Kingdom. It was established by local authorities, and was formally incorporated on 13 March 1903.

Over the following decades it became responsible for insuring most public sector bodies, including councils, police and fire authorities. Between 1990 and 1992, the company suffered substantial losses, and its assets were reduced to below the minimum level for solvency. In 1993, it was bought by Zurich Insurance, although MMI itself continues to pay all its outstanding liabilities.
