= Motoring (film) =

1927 film

- Directed by: George Dewhurst
- Written by: Harry Tate (sketch); Eliot Stannard
- Starring: Harry Tate; Henry Latimer; Roy Travers
- Production company: Inter-Cine
- Distributed by: Inter-Cine
- Release date: 1927
- Running time: 5,506 feet
- Country: United Kingdom
- Language: English

Motoring is a 1927 British silent comedy film directed by George Dewhurst and starring Harry Tate, Henry Latimer and Roy Travers. It was based on one of Tate's own music hall sketches. The screenplay concerns a passing motorist who helps a woman to elope with her lover.

== Cast ==
- Harry Tate - Harry
- Henry Latimer - Basil Love
- Roy Travers - Sir Stone Flint
- Ronald Tate - The Boy

== Bibliography ==
- Low, Rachael. History of the British Film, 1918-1929. George Allen & Unwin, 1971.
