= Walter Byron (actor) =

English actor

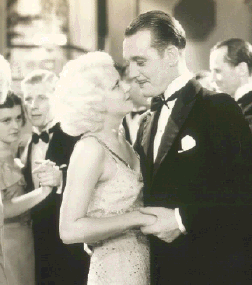
- Jean Harlow and Byron in Three Wise Girls (1932)
- Born: 11 June 1899
- Died: 2 March 1972 (aged 72)
- Occupation: Actor
- Years active: 1926-1942

Walter Byron (11 June 1899 – 2 March 1972) was an English film actor.

== Biography ==
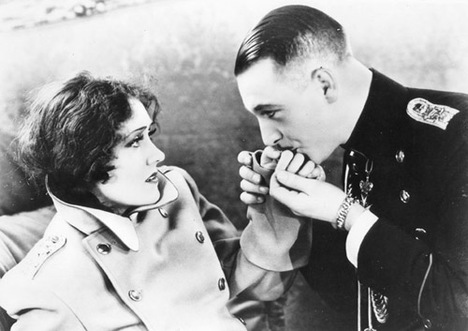
Gloria Swanson and Walter Byron in Queen Kelly

He starred opposite Gloria Swanson in the 1929 film Queen Kelly and appeared in more than 60 films between 1926 and 1942. He first sailed to the United States on the R.M.S. Aquitania under contract with Samuel Goldwyn Productions, in 1928. In 1932, in order to gain permanent legal immigrant status, he crossed the border at Calexico into Mexico and then reentered the United States there under the new status. He became a United States citizen in 1954.

== Selected filmography ==
- White Heat (1927) - Julian Jefferson
- Passion Island (1927) - Tony
- One of the Best (1927) - Lt. Dudley Keppel
- Victory (1928) - Major King
- Two Little Drummer Boys (1928) - Capt. Carsdale
- Tommy Atkins (1928) - Harold
- The Awakening (1928) - Count Karl von Hagen
- Yvette (1928)
- The Passenger (1928)
- Croquette (1928) - Bob
- Queen Kelly (1929) - Prince Wolfram
- The Sacred Flame (1929) - Colin Taylor
- Not Damaged (1930) - Kirk Randolph
- The Dancers (1930) - Berwin
- The Lion and the Lamb (1931) - Dave
- The Reckless Hour (1931) - Allen Crane
- The Last Flight (1931) - Frink
- Left Over Ladies (1931) - Ronny
- The Yellow Ticket (1931) - Count Nikolai
- Three Wise Girls (1932) - Jerry Dexter
- The Menace (1932) - Ronald Quayle / Robert Crockett
- Shop Angel (1932) - Don Irwin
- Vanity Fair (1932) - George Osborne
- Sinners in the Sun (1932) - Eric Nelson
- Society Girl (1932) - Warburton
- Week Ends Only (1932) - Jimmy Brigg
- Exposure (1932) - Andy Bryant
- This Sporting Age (1932) - Charles Morrell
- The Crusader (1932) - Joe Carson
- Slightly Married (1932) - Jimmie Martin
- Queen Kelly (1932) - Prince Wolfram
- The Savage Girl (1932) - Jim Franklin
- Grand Slam (1933) - Barney Starr (uncredited)
- What Price Decency (1933) - Tom O'Neil
- Kiss of Araby (1933) - Lt. W. B. Lawrence
- Charlie Chan's Greatest Case (1933) - Henry Jennison
- Big Time or Bust (1933) - John Hammond
- East of Fifth Avenue (1933) - Paul Baxter
- Man of Two Worlds (1934) - Eric Pager
- Once to Every Woman (1934) - Dr. Preston
- All Men Are Enemies (1934) - Walter Ripton
- British Agent (1934) - Under Secretary Stanley
- Folies Bergère de Paris (1935) - Marquis René de Lac
- Don't Bet on Blondes (1935) - Dwight Boardman
- If You Could Only Cook (1935) - Roy - Pianist at Wedding Rehearsal (uncredited)
- The Bridge of Sighs (1936) - Arny Norman
- Mary of Scotland (1936) - Walsingham
- Top of the Town (1937) - Nightclub Patron (uncredited)
- As Good as Married (1937) - Server (uncredited)
- Back in Circulation (1937) - Carlton Whitney
- Mr. Boggs Steps Out (1938) - Dennis Andrews
- Frontier Scout (1938) - Lt. Adams
- Trade Winds (1938) - Bob (uncredited)
- Risky Business (1939) - Actor (uncredited)
- Death Goes North (1939) - Al Norton
- Crashing Thru (1939) - McClusky
- A Girl, a Guy and a Gob (1941) - Opera Patron (uncredited)
- One Night in Lisbon (1941) - Dinner Guest (uncredited)
- Confirm or Deny (1941) - Minor Role (uncredited)
- Nazi Agent (1942) - Officer (uncredited)
- Mrs. Miniver (1942) - Man in Tavern (uncredited)
- The Mummy's Tomb (1942) - Searcher (uncredited)
- Once Upon a Honeymoon (1942) - Guard (uncredited)
- Gentleman Jim (1942) - Ringside Telegrapher (uncredited)
