= M. A. Wetherell =

British actor (1883–1939)

- Born: 1883; Bodmin, Cornwall, England
- Died: 25 February 1939 (aged 55–56)
- Occupations: Film director, Actor, Screenwriter, Film producer

Marmaduke Arundel "Duke" Wetherell (1883 – 25 February 1939) was a British–South African actor, screenwriter, producer, film director and big-game hunter. He was responsible for the hoax "surgeon's photograph" of the Loch Ness Monster.

== Biography ==
Born in Bodmin, Cornwall, Wetherell acted in both British and South African films during the silent era. In the 1920s he branched out to producing and directing films but they were not a success.

He produced, directed and played the lead role in his productions of Livingstone (1925) and Robinson Crusoe (1927). A planned biography of Lawrence of Arabia called Revolt in the Desert to be photographed by Freddie Young who had photographed his war films The Somme (1927) and Victory (1928) did not eventuate. Wetherell was the father of actor Ian Colin.

In the 1930s, Marmaduke went to Loch Ness to look for the Loch Ness Monster. Wetherell claimed to have found footprints, but when casts of the footprints were sent to scientists for analysis they turned out to be from a hippopotamus; a prankster had used a hippopotamus-foot umbrella stand. (There is strong evidence that Wetherell perpetrated the hoax himself) As a result, Wetherell was publicly ridiculed by his employer, the Daily Mail. To get revenge on the Mail, Wetherell perpetrated the hoax "surgeon's photograph" of the Loch Ness Monster with his son Ian (who bought the material for the fake and took the photos), son-in-law Christian Spurling (a sculpture specialist), and Maurice Chambers (an insurance agent), taking a picture of a toy submarine made of plastic wood and passing it off as the monster. Chambers gave the photographic plates to surgeon Robert Kenneth Wilson, a friend of his who enjoyed "a good practical joke". Wilson had the plates developed and sold the first photo to the Daily Mail; the Mail would then announce that the monster had been photographed. The photo had been described as a hoax as early as 1975, but this was not common knowledge among the general public until 1994.

== Selected filmography ==
Actor

- The Rose of Rhodesia (1918)
- Isban: Or the Mystery of the Great Zimbabwe (1920)
- The Madcap of the Veld (1921)
- Wee MacGregor's Sweetheart (1922)
- Man and His Kingdom (1922)
- His Wife's Husband (1922)
- Darkness (1923)
- Curfew Must Not Ring Tonight (1923)
- Women and Diamonds (1924)

Director

- Livingstone (1925)
- Robinson Crusoe (1927)
- The Somme (1927)
- Victory (1928)
- A Moorland Tragedy (1933)
- Hearts of Oak (1933)
- Wanderlust (1933)
- Safari (1937)

Producer

- Roses of Picardy (1927)

== Bibliography ==
- Low, Rachael. History of the British Film, 1918–1929. George Allen & Unwin, 1971.
