= Robinson Crusoe (1927 film) =

1927 film

- Opening titles
- Directed by: M.A. Wetherell
- Written by: Daniel Defoe (novel); M.A. Wetherell (screenwriter)
- Produced by: M.A. Wetherell
- Starring: M.A. Wetherell; Fay Compton; Herbert Waithe
- Cinematography: Joe Rosenthal
- Edited by: H. Foster
- Production company: M. A. Wetherell Productions
- Distributed by: Epic Films
- Release dates: May 1927 (silent version); 1932 (sound version)
- Running time: 45 minutes
- Country: United Kingdom
- Language: English

Robinson Crusoe is a 1927 British silent drama film produced and directed by M.A. Wetherell and starring Wetherell, Fay Compton and Herbert Waithe. It was written by Wetherell, adapted from the 1719 novel Robinson Crusoe by Daniel Defoe.

A sound version of this film was released in 1932. While it had no audible dialogue, it featured a synchronised musical score with sound effects.

== Plot ==
The film tells the adventures of Robinson Crusoe, a shipwrecked man stranded on a desert island.

== Cast ==
- M.A. Wetherell as Robinson Crusoe
- Fay Compton as Sophie Bruce
- Herbert Waithe as Man Friday
- Reginald Fox

== Production ==
The film was made at Cricklewood Studios and Lime Grove Studios in London.

== Reception ==
Kine Weekly wrote: "M.A. Wethereill travelled 8,000 miles io the Island of Tobago to get the authentic backgrounds for his picturisation of Defoe's story. There is not much inspiration about the production, and the action is slow, but the atmosphere is sincere and the settings novel. ... All credit is due to M. A. Wetherell for the difficulties he has overcome in making this picture, but one cannot help feeling that it lacks inspiration. The action is inclined to be dull when the novelty of the scenery wears off, and such incidents as the finding of Friday and the rescue of the ship's officers lack excitement. On the other hand, a good sense of Crusoe's isolation has been achieved."

The Daily Film Renter wrote: "Delightful scenic shots. A small part for Fay Compton sincerely presented. Little light relief, except for monkey's antics. ... Picture which, released at Christmas, should make an appeal specially to children on the popularity of the book and the sincere attempt to portray the principal scenes with fidelity. The fact that over a considerable length only one character appears prevents the variety usually looked for in screen entertainment, and the action is at times slow."
