= Chris Leonard =

English footballer

Personal information
- Full name: Christopher Leonard
- Date of birth: 11 July 1927
- Place of birth: Jarrow, England
- Date of death: 1987 (aged 59–60)
- Place of death: Wearhead, County Durham, England
- Position: Centre half

Senior career*
Years	Team	Apps	(Gls)
–	South Shields		
1952–1954	Darlington	26	(0)
- * Club domestic league appearances and goals

Christopher Leonard (11 July 1927 – 1987) was an English footballer who made 26 appearances in the Football League playing as a centre half for Darlington in the 1950s. He also played non-league football for South Shields. He died in Wearhead, County Durham in 1987.
