= Renée Houston =

Scottish comedy actress and revue artist (1902–1980)

- Born: Katherina Rita Murphy Gribbin; 24 July 1902; Johnstone, Renfrewshire, Scotland
- Died: 9 February 1980 (aged 77); Brinsworth House, Twickenham, England
- Occupations: Actress, comedian
- Years active: 1910s–1980

Renée Houston (born Katherina Rita Murphy Gribbin; 24 July 1902 – 9 February 1980) was a Scottish comedy actress and revue artist who appeared in television and film roles.

== Biography ==
Born in Johnstone, Renfrewshire, into a theatrical family who performed as James Houston and Company, she toured music halls and revues with her sister Billie Houston (born Sarah McMahon Gribbin; 1906–1972) as the "Houston Sisters". They became a leading variety act in the 1920s, sometimes performing as two children in over-sized furniture; Billie played the part of a boy.

In 1926, the sisters made a short musical film, the script of which Renée had written. It was produced by Lee De Forest, whose process, Phonofilm, enabled a soundtrack to be played alongside the film (a year before The Jazz Singer). The sisters ended their working partnership in 1936, when Billie reportedly became ill, although it has been suggested that the split may have been due to the sisters' frequent disagreements.

Renee Houston continued as a solo comedienne and actress, appearing in the Noel Gay revue Love Laughs!. She eventually revived her double act, this time with her third husband, the actor Donald Stewart, until his death in 1966.

In her later years, she specialised in "battleaxe" roles, notably as shop steward Vic Spanner's (Kenneth Cope) formidable mother in Carry On at Your Convenience (1971). She also worked for director Roman Polanski in Repulsion (1965) and Cul-de-sac (1966). She published her autobiography in 1974 which was entitled Don't Fence Me In.

Houston was also in early episodes of radio's The Clitheroe Kid, playing his Scottish mother in half a dozen 1958 broadcasts (but the role was quickly recast to use an English actress instead), and was a regular guest on radio panel show Petticoat Line chaired by Anona Winn. According to entertainment historian Richard Anthony Baker: "So many listeners found her forthright language unacceptable that she was eventually limited to two swear words per show."

She died in London at the age of 77 on 9 February 1980. Houston was married three times. The second was to the actor Pat Aherne, the brother of Brian Aherne. Her third husband was the actor Donald Stewart.

== Filmography ==
=== Film ===
Year	Title	Role	Notes
1932	Come Into My Parlour	Jenny MacDonald	
1933	Their Night Out	Maggie Oliphant	
1933	Radio Parade	Herself	
1934	Lost in the Legion	Mary McFee	
1934	Mr. Cinders	Mrs. Phipps	
1935	No Monkey Business	Jessie	
1936	Happy Days Revue	Kitty Seymour	
1937	Fine Feathers	Teenie McPherson	
1939	A Girl Must Live	Gloria Lind	
1941	Old Bill and Son	Stella Malloy	
1943	The Peterville Diamond	Lady Margaret	
1944	Two Thousand Women	Maud Wright	
1951	Lady Godiva Rides Again	Beattie	AKA, Bikini Baby
1954	The Belles of St. Trinian's	Miss Brimmer	
1955	Track the Man Down	Pat Sherwood	
1956	A Town Like Alice	Ebbey	
1956	The Big Money	Bobbie	
1957	Time Without Pity	Mrs. Harker	
1958	The Horse's Mouth	Sara Monday	
1958	Them Nice Americans	Mrs. Adams	
1960	The Flesh and the Fiends	Helen Burke	
1960	And the Same to You	Mildred Pomphret	
1961	Three on a Spree	Mrs. Gray	
1961	Watch It, Sailor!	Mrs. Mottram	
1961	No My Darling Daughter	Miss Yardley	
1962	The Phantom of the Opera	Mrs. Tucker	
1962	Fog for the Killer	Ma Johnson	
1963	Nurse on Wheels	Mrs. Beacon	
1963	The Rescue Squad	Mrs. Manse	
1963	Tomorrow at Ten	Masie Maddox	
1963	Carry On Cabby	Molly	
1964	Carry On Spying	Madame	
1965	Repulsion	Miss Balch	
1966	Cul-de-sac	Christopher's Mother	
1966	Secrets of a Windmill Girl	Molly	
1966	The Spy with a Cold Nose	Lady Blanchflower	
1967	River Rivals	Mrs. Fredericks	
1971	Carry On at Your Convenience	Agatha Spanner	
1975	Legend of the Werewolf	Chou-Chou	

=== Television ===
Year	Title	Role	Notes
1956–57	ITV Television Playhouse	Mrs. MacDonald, Marthy	Episodes: "The Blood Is Strong", "Anna Christie"
1957	The Errol Flynn Theatre	Mrs. Bridie	Episode: "Take the High Road"
1957	Armchair Theatre	Ethel Watts	Episode: "Rappaport Always Pays"
1957	Anna Christie	Marthy	TV film
1957–58	Sunday Night Theatre	Vi Vining, Bessie	Episodes: "The Day's Mischief", "A Nest of Robins"
1958	The Adventures of Robin Hood (TV series)	Little John's Mother	Episode: "Little Mother"
1960	Maigret	Madame Ja Ja	Episode: "Liberty Bar"
1960–61	No Hiding Place	Grannie Wheedon, Mrs. Lacey	Episodes: "Footsteps on the Ceiling", "Fever"
1961	Doctor Knock	Madame Remy	Episode: "Act 3"
1962	Dinner with the Family	Madame de Montrachet	TV film
1962	A Matter of Conscience	Korableva	TV film
1962	Man of the World	Mrs. Van Kempson	Episode: "The Runaways"
1963	Z-Cars	Big Rosie	Episode: "Scare"
1963	Taxi!	Gig Lambert	Episode: "Barricades in Bailey Street"
1963–64	The Saint	Ida Warshed, Mrs. McAlister	Episodes: "The Gentle Ladies", "The Wonderful War"
1964, 1967	Dr. Finlay's Casebook	Mrs. Bright, Mrs. Johnston	Episodes: "My Late Dear Husband", "Over My Dead Body"
1966	Dixon of Dock Green	Mrs. Loman	Episode: "Death of a Donkeyman"
1966	ITV Play of the Week	Mother Brinicombe	Episode: "The First Thunder"
1966	Knock on Any Door	Marion Scoullar	Episode: "The Dear Ones"
1967	Trapped	Ivy	Episode: "Goodnight Mrs Dill"
1967	River Rivals	Mrs. Fredericks	TV series
1969	W. Somerset Maugham	"Frank" Hickson	Episode: "The Three Fat Women of Antibes"
1969	Doctor in the House	Mrs. Muir	Episodes: "Peace and Quiet", "If In Doubt - Cut It Out!"
1969	ITV Sunday Night Theatre	Olive	Episode: "The Comic"
1973	Special Branch	Scotswoman	Episode: "You Won't Remember Me"

== Bibliography ==
- Halliwell's Who's Who in the Movies HarperCollins ISBN 0-06-093507-3
- Renée Houston: Spirit of the Irresistibles by Miranda Brooke Tempest Time ISBN 978-1-5262-0636-7
