= 1949 in British radio =

This is a list of events from British radio in 1949.

== Events ==
=== January ===
- 9 January – The death today in London of comedian Tommy Handley is announced after the Sunday evening repeat of his popular series It's That Man Again by the Director General of the BBC, Sir William Haley, who insists on making the announcement himself; ITMA is immediately cancelled and succeeded by Ray's a Laugh with Ted Ray, while Take It from Here takes over its repeat slot.

=== February ===
- 2 February – Parody travelogue "Balham - Gateway to the South", written by Frank Muir and Denis Norden, is first broadcast as a comedy sketch narrated by Peter Sellers in the second edition of Third Division on the BBC Third Programme.

=== March ===
- 26 March – The Boat Race 1949 is memorable for a blooper in which BBC commentator John Snagge, on a launch whose engine has failed, announces "I can't see who's in the lead, but it's either Oxford or Cambridge."
- 28 March – Astronomer Fred Hoyle coins the term Big Bang during a BBC Third Programme broadcast (although describing the model as "unsatisfactory").

=== April to August ===
- No events.

=== September ===
- 5 September – Wagnerian tenor Walter Widdop makes his last appearance at the BBC Proms, singing an aria from Lohengrin, only one day before his sudden death.

=== October to December ===
- No events.

=== Undated ===
- The BBC issues to its staff BBC Variety Programmes Policy Guide, for writers & producers (the "little green book"), setting out what are and are not permissible topics and language in entertainment programmes.

== Debuts ==
- 26 January – Third Division on the BBC Third Programme (26 January–2 March)
- 31 January – A Book at Bedtime (1949 – present)
- 6 March – Billy Cotton Band Show (1949–1968)
- 4 April – Ray's a Laugh (1949–1961)
- 13 May – The McCooeys on the BBC Home Service in Northern Ireland (1949–1956)

== Continuing radio programmes ==
=== 1930s ===
- In Town Tonight (1933–1960)

=== 1940s ===
- Music While You Work (1940–1967)
- Sunday Half Hour (1940–2018)
- Desert Island Discs (1942 – present)
- Family Favourites (1945–1980)
- Down Your Way (1946–1992)
- Have A Go (1946–1967)
- Housewives' Choice (1946–1967)
- Letter from America (1946–2004)
- Woman's Hour (1946 – present)
- Twenty Questions (1947–1976)
- Any Questions? (1948 – present)
- Mrs Dale's Diary (1948–1969)
- Take It from Here (1948–1960)

== Ending this year ==
- 6 January – It's That Man Again (1939–1949)

== Births ==
- 7 February – Les Ross, né Meakin, midlands DJ
- 12 March – David Mellor, politician and radio presenter
- 2 April – Paul Gambaccini, American-born music presenter
- 11 April – David Stafford, writer and broadcaster (died 2023)
- 20 April – Paul Heiney, broadcaster
- 7 August – Matthew Parris, South African-born political writer and broadcaster, previously MP
- 2 September – Moira Stuart, broadcast presenter
- 25 November – Isabel Hilton, Scottish-born journalist and broadcaster
- 12 December – Bill Nighy, actor
- Philip Dodd, creative arts academic and broadcaster

== Deaths ==
- 9 January – Tommy Handley, comedian (born 1892)
- 10 June – Sir Frederick Ogilvie, broadcasting executive and university administrator (born 1893)
- 9 July – Peter Waring, comedian and fraudster, suicide (born 1916)

== See also ==
- 1949 in British music
- 1949 in British television
- 1949 in the United Kingdom
- List of British films of 1949
