= List of Italian films of 1949 =

A list of films produced in Italy in 1949 (see 1949 in film):

| Title | Director | Cast | Genre | Notes |
|---|---|---|---|---|
1949
| Adam and Eve | Mario Mattoli | Erminio Macario, Isa Barzizza, Nerio Bernardi | Comedy | |
| Alarm Bells | Luigi Zampa | Gina Lollobrigida, Yvonne Sanson, Eduardo De Filippo | Drama | |
| Altura | Mario Sequi | Massimo Girotti, Roldano Lupi, Eleonora Rossi Drago | Drama | |
| Anthony of Padua | Pietro Francisci | Aldo Fiorelli, Silvana Pampanini, Carlo Giustini | Historical | |
| Bitter Rice | Giuseppe De Santis | Silvana Mangano, Doris Dowling, Raf Vallone, Vittorio Gassman | Neorealist drama | Academy Award for Best Story nominee |
| Black Magic | Gregory Ratoff | Orson Welles, Akim Tamiroff, Valentina Cortese | Historical | Co-production with the US |
| The Bride Can't Wait | Gianni Franciolini | Gino Cervi, Gina Lollobrigida, Odile Versois | Comedy | |
| Buried Alive | Guido Brignone | Milly Vitale, Paul Muller, Evi Maltagliati | Historical | |
| Call of the Blood | John Clements, Ladislao Vajda | John Clements, Kay Hammond, Carlo Ninchi | Drama | Co-production with Britain |
| Chains | Raffaello Matarazzo | Amedeo Nazzari, Yvonne Sanson, Aldo Nicodemi, Teresa Franchini | Melodrama | |
| The Dynamite Brothers | Nino Pagot, Toni Pagot | Aldo Silvani | Animation | One of the first Italian animated films together with The Rose of Baghdad |
| The Emperor of Capri | Luigi Comencini | Totò, Yvonne Sanson, Marisa Merlini, Laura Gore | Comedy | |
| Fabiola | Alessandro Blasetti | Michèle Morgan, Michel Simon, Massimo Girotti | Historical | Co-production with France |
| The Firemen of Viggiù | Mario Mattoli | Totò, Isa Barzizza, Carlo Campanini, Ave Ninchi | Comedy | |
| The Flame That Will Not Die | Vittorio Cottafavi | Gino Cervi, María Denis, Leonardo Cortese | War drama | |
| Flying Squadron | Luigi Capuano | Massimo Serato, Dina Sassoli, Umberto Spadaro | Adventure | |
| Golden Madonna | Luigi Carpentieri, Ladislao Vajda | Phyllis Calvert, Tullio Carminati, Michael Rennie | Drama | Co-production with Britain |
| Hand of Death | Carlo Campogalliani | María Martín, Adriano Rimoldi, Carlo Ninchi | Melodrama | |
| Heaven over the Marshes | Augusto Genina | Rubi D'Alma, Michele Malaspina, Domenico Viglione Borghese | Drama | Venice Award, Nastro d'Argento Best Director |
| How I Discovered America | Carlo Borghesio | Erminio Macario, Carlo Ninchi, Delia Scala | Comedy | |
| In the Name of the Law | Pietro Germi | Massimo Girotti, Jone Salinas, Saro Urzì | Crime | |
| The Iron Swordsman | Riccardo Freda | Carlo Ninchi, Gianna Maria Canale, Luigi Pavese | Historical | |
| It's Forever Springtime | Renato Castellani | Elena Varzi, Irene Genna, Renato Baldini | Neorealist drama | Nastro d'Argento Best script |
| Little Lady | Mario Mattoli | Gino Bechi, Antonella Lualdi, Aroldo Tieri | Comedy | |
| The Mill on the Po | Alberto Lattuada | Carla Del Poggio, Jacques Sernas, Giulio Calì, Nino Pavese | Drama | |
| The Monastery of Santa Chiara | Mario Sequi | Edda Albertini, Massimo Serato, Nyta Dover | Drama | |
| A Night of Fame | Mario Monicelli, Steno | Marcel Cerdan, Ferruccio Tagliavini, Mischa Auer | Comedy | |
| The Pirates of Capri | Edgar G. Ulmer | Louis Hayward, Binnie Barnes, Mariella Lotti | Adventure | Co-production with US |
| Return to Naples | Domenico Gambino | Nino Manfredi, Carlo Lombardi, Paola Barbara | Drama | |
| The Rose of Baghdad | Anton Gino Domenighini | Giulio Panicali, Carlo Romano, Olinto Cristina, Mario Besesti, Giovanna Scotto, Lauro Gazzolo, Giulio Fioravanti | Animation | Dubbed into English as The Singing Princess with Julie Andrews |
| Sicilian Uprising | Giorgio Pastina | Marina Berti, Clara Calamai, Roldano Lupi | Historical | |
| Toto Le Mokò | Carlo Ludovico Bragaglia | Totò, Gianna Maria Canale, Carlo Ninchi | Comedy | Parody of Pépé le Moko |
| Toto Looks For a House | Steno, Mario Monicelli | Totò, Alda Mangini, Lia Molfesi, Aroldo Tieri | Comedy | Close to Italian neorealism |
| Twenty Years | Giorgio Bianchi | Oscar Blando, Francesco Golisano, Marcello Mastroianni | Comedy | |
| Vertigine d'amore | Luigi Capuano | Elli Parvo, Folco Lulli, Charles Vanel | Drama | Co-production with France |
| The Walls of Malapaga | René Clément | Jean Gabin, Isa Miranda, Andrea Checchi | Drama | Co-production with France |
| The White Line | Luigi Zampa | Raf Vallone, Gina Lollobrigida, Erno Crisa | Drama | |
| William Tell | Giorgio Pastina, Michał Waszyński | Gino Cervi, Paul Muller, Gabriele Ferzetti | Adventure | |
| The Wolf of the Sila | Duilio Coletti | Silvana Mangano, Amedeo Nazzari, Vittorio Gassman | Drama | |
| Yvonne of the Night | Giuseppe Amato | Totò, Olga Villi, Frank Latimore, Gino Cervi | Drama | |
