= List of British films of 1949 =

British films released in 1949

A list of films produced in the United Kingdom in 1949 (see 1949 in film):

== 1949 ==
Title	Director	Cast	Genre	Notes
1949
Adam and Evelyne	Harold French	Stewart Granger, Jean Simmons	Romance	
The Adventures of Jane	Edward G. Whiting	Chrystabel Leighton-Porter	Comedy based on comic strip	
The Adventures of PC 49	Godfrey Grayson	Hugh Latimer, John Penrose	Crime	
All Over the Town	Derek N. Twist	Norman Wooland, Sarah Churchill	Comedy	
The Bad Lord Byron	David MacDonald	Dennis Price, Mai Zetterling	Historical	
Badger's Green	John Irwin	Barbara Murray, Brian Nissen	Comedy	
The Blue Lagoon	Frank Launder	Jean Simmons, Donald Houston	Drama	
Blue Scar	Jill Craigie	Emrys Jones, Gwynneth Vaughan	Drama	
A Boy, a Girl and a Bike	Ralph Smart	John McCallum, Honor Blackman	Comedy	
Boys in Brown	Montgomery Tully	Jack Warner, Richard Attenborough	Drama	
Cardboard Cavalier	Walter Forde	Sid Field, Margaret Lockwood	Comedy	
The Case of Charles Peace	Norman Lee	Michael Martin Harvey, Chili Bouchier	Crime	
Celia	Francis Searle	Hy Hazell, Bruce Lester	Comedy thriller	
Children of Chance	Luigi Zampa	Patricia Medina, Yvonne Mitchell	Drama	
The Chiltern Hundreds	John Paddy Carstairs	Cecil Parker, A. E. Matthews, David Tomlinson	Comedy	
Christopher Columbus	David MacDonald	Fredric March, Florence Eldridge	Historical	
Conspirator	Victor Saville	Elizabeth Taylor, Robert Taylor	Thriller	
The Cure for Love	Robert Donat	Robert Donat, Renée Asherson	Comedy	
Dark Secret	Maclean Rogers	Dinah Sheridan, Emrys Jones	Crime	
Dear Mr. Prohack	Thornton Freeland	Cecil Parker, Glynis Johns	Comedy	
Diamond City	David MacDonald	David Farrar, Honor Blackman, Diana Dors	South African western	
Dick Barton Strikes Back	Godfrey Grayson	Don Stannard	Action based on radio serial	
Doctor Morelle	Godfrey Grayson	Valentine Dyall, Peter Drury	Mystery	
Don't Ever Leave Me	Arthur Crabtree	Petula Clark, Jimmy Hanley	Romantic comedy	
Edward, My Son	George Cukor	Spencer Tracy, Deborah Kerr	Drama	Kerr's first time Oscar nomination
Eureka Stockade	Harry Watt	Chips Rafferty, Jane Barrett	Drama	Filmed in Australia
Floodtide	Frederick Wilson	Gordon Jackson, Rona Anderson	Drama	
Fools Rush In	John Paddy Carstairs	Sally Ann Howes, Guy Rolfe	Comedy	
For Them That Trespass	Alberto Cavalcanti	Richard Todd, Patricia Plunkett, Stephen Murray	Crime	
Forbidden	George King	Douglass Montgomery, Hazel Court	Thriller	
The Forbidden Street	Jean Negulesco	Dana Andrews, Maureen O'Hara	Drama	
Give Us This Day	Edward Dmytryk	Sam Wanamaker, Lea Padovani	Drama	
The Glass Mountain	Edoardo Anton, Henry Cass	Michael Denison, Dulcie Gray	Drama	
Golden Arrow	Gordon Parry	Burgess Meredith, Jean-Pierre Aumont	Comedy	
Golden Madonna	Ladislao Vajda	Phyllis Calvert, Tullio Carminati	Drama	
The Hasty Heart	Vincent Sherman	Ronald Reagan, Richard Todd, Patricia Neal	World War II drama	
Helter Skelter	Ralph Thomas	Carol Marsh, David Tomlinson	Comedy	
High Jinks in Society	John Guillermin, Robert Jordan Hill	Ben Wrigley, Barbara Shaw	Comedy	
The History of Mr. Polly	Anthony Pelissier	John Mills, Sally Ann Howes	Drama	
The Huggetts Abroad	Ken Annakin	Jack Warner, Kathleen Harrison, Dinah Sheridan, Jimmy Hanley		'
The Interrupted Journey	Daniel Birt	Valerie Hobson, Richard Todd	Thriller	
It's Not Cricket	Alfred Roome	Basil Radford, Naunton Wayne	Comedy	
The Jack of Diamonds	Vernon Sewell	Nigel Patrick, Cyril Raymond	Adventure	
Kind Hearts and Coronets	Robert Hamer	Dennis Price, Valerie Hobson, Joan Greenwood, Alec Guinness	Black comedy	Number 6 in the list of BFI Top 100 British films
Landfall	Ken Annakin	Michael Denison, Patricia Plunkett	War	
The Last Days of Dolwyn	Emlyn Williams, Russell Lloyd	Edith Evans, Richard Burton	Drama	
The Lost People	Muriel Box	Richard Attenborough, Dennis Price, Mai Zetterling	Drama	
Madness of the Heart	Charles Bennett	Margaret Lockwood, Kathleen Byron	Drama	
A Man's Affair	Jay Lewis	Diana Decker, Joan Dowling	Comedy	
The Man from Yesterday	Oswald Mitchell	John Stuart, Henry Oscar	Thriller	
The Man in Black	Francis Searle	Betty Ann Davies, Sheila Burrell	Thriller	
Man on the Run	Lawrence Huntington	Derek Farr, Joan Hopkins	Thriller	
Marry Me!	Terence Fisher	Derek Bond, Susan Shaw	Comedy	
A Matter of Murder	John Gilling	Maureen Riscoe, John Barry	Crime	
Maytime in Mayfair	Herbert Wilcox	Anna Neagle, Michael Wilding	Musical comedy	
Meet Simon Cherry	Godfrey Grayson	Hugh Moxey, Jeanette Tregarthen	Mystery	
Melody Club	Robert S. Baker, Monty Berman	Terry-Thomas, Arthur Gomez	Comedy	
Melody in the Dark	Robert Jordan Hill	Ben Wrigley, Eunice Gayson	Musical	
Miss Pilgrim's Progress	Val Guest	Michael Rennie, Yolande Donlan	Comedy	
Murder at the Windmill	Val Guest	Garry Marsh, Jon Pertwee	Crime	
No Way Back	Stefan Osiecki	Terence De Marney, Eleanor Summerfield	Crime	
Now Barabbas	Gordon Parry	Richard Greene, Cedric Hardwicke	Drama	
Obsession	Edward Dmytryk	Robert Newton, Sally Gray	Crime	
Old Mother Riley's New Venture	John Harlow	Arthur Lucan, Kitty McShane, Chili Bouchier	Comedy	
Once a Jolly Swagman	Jack Lee	Dirk Bogarde, Bonar Colleano	Drama	
Once Upon a Dream	Ralph Thomas	Googie Withers, Guy Middleton	Comedy	
Paper Orchid	Roy Ward Baker	Hugh Williams, Hy Hazell, Sid James	Mystery	
The Passionate Friends	David Lean	Ann Todd, Claude Rains, Trevor Howard	Drama	Based on the H. G. Wells novel
Passport to Pimlico	Henry Cornelius	Margaret Rutherford, Stanley Holloway, Hermione Baddeley	Comedy	Number 63 in the list of BFI Top 100 British films
The Perfect Woman	Bernard Knowles	Patricia Roc, Stanley Holloway	Comedy	
Poet's Pub	Frederick Wilson	Derek Bond, Rona Anderson	Comedy	
Private Angelo	Michael Anderson, Peter Ustinov	Godfrey Tearle, Maria Denis	Comedy/war	
The Queen of Spades	Thorold Dickinson	Anton Walbrook, Edith Evans	Fantasy	
The Rocking Horse Winner	Anthony Pelissier	Valerie Hobson, John Howard Davies	Fantasy	
The Romantic Age	Edmond T. Gréville	Hugh Williams, Mai Zetterling, Petula Clark	Comedy	
A Run for Your Money	Charles Frend	Donald Houston, Meredith Edwards, Alec Guinness	Comedy	
Saints and Sinners	Leslie Arliss	Kieron Moore, Christine Norden	Comedy/drama	
School for Randle	John E. Blakeley	Frank Randle, Dan Young	Comedy	
Silent Dust	Lance Comfort	Nigel Patrick, Sally Gray, Stephen Murray	Drama	
Skimpy in the Navy	Stafford Dickens	Hal Monty, Max Bygraves	Comedy	
The Small Back Room	Michael Powell, Emeric Pressburger	David Farrar, Kathleen Byron, Jack Hawkins	World War II	
Somewhere in Politics	John E. Blakeley	Frank Randle, Tessie O'Shea	Comedy	
The Spider and the Fly	Robert Hamer	Eric Portman, Guy Rolfe	Crime	
Stop Press Girl	Michael Barry	Sally Ann Howes, Gordon Jackson	Comedy	
The Temptress	Oswald Mitchell	Joan Maude, Arnold Bell	Drama	
That Dangerous Age	Gregory Ratoff	Myrna Loy, Roger Livesey, Peggy Cummins	Romance	
The Third Man	Carol Reed	Orson Welles, Joseph Cotten, Alida Valli, Trevor Howard	Mystery	Number 1 in the list of BFI Top 100 British films
Third Time Lucky	Gordon Parry	Glynis Johns, Dermot Walsh	Crime	
Train of Events	Sidney Cole, Charles Crichton, Basil Dearden	Jack Warner, Peter Finch, Valerie Hobson	Drama	
Traveller's Joy	Ralph Thomas	Googie Withers, John McCallum	Comedy	
Trottie True	Brian Desmond Hurst	Jean Kent, Hugh Sinclair, James Donald	Musical/comedy	
Under Capricorn	Alfred Hitchcock	Ingrid Bergman, Joseph Cotten, Michael Wilding	Drama	Filmed in Australia
Vengeance Is Mine	Alan Cullimore	Valentine Dyall, Anne Firth, Richard Goolden	Crime	
Vote for Huggett	Ken Annakin	Jack Warner, Kathleen Harrison, Susan Shaw, Diana Dors	Comedy	
Warning to Wantons	Donald B. Wilson	Harold Warrender, Anne Vernon	Romantic comedy	
What a Carry On!	John E. Blakeley	Jimmy Jewel, Ben Warriss	Comedy	
Whisky Galore!	Alexander Mackendrick	Basil Radford, Bruce Seton, Joan Greenwood, Gordon Jackson	Comedy	Number 24 in the list of BFI Top 100 British films

== See also ==
- 1949 in British music
- 1949 in British television
- 1949 in the United Kingdom
