= 1949 in film =

The year 1949 in film involved some significant events.

== Top-grossing films (U.S.) ==
The top ten 1949 released films by box office gross in North America are as follows:

Highest-grossing films of 1949
Rank	Title	Distributor	Domestic rentals
1	Jolson Sings Again	Columbia	$5,000,000
2	Battleground	MGM	$4,722,000
3	I Was a Male War Bride	20th Century Fox	$4,100,000
4	Sands of Iwo Jima	Republic	$4,000,000
5	The Stratton Story	MGM	$3,831,000
6	Pinky	20th Century Fox	$3,800,000
7	The Heiress	20th Century Fox	$3,700,000
8	Mr. Belvedere Goes to College	20th Century Fox	$3,700,000
9	Neptune's Daughter	MGM	$3,477,000
10	Little Women	MGM	$3,425,000

== Events ==
- April 26 – June 21 – Ealing comedies Passport to Pimlico, Whisky Galore! and Kind Hearts and Coronets are released in the UK, leading to 1949 being remembered as one of the peak years of the Ealing comedies.
- November 15 – Following the prior year's Supreme Court decision in United States v. Paramount Pictures, Inc., Paramount Pictures is split into two separate companies with the creation of Paramount Pictures Corporation for production-distribution and United Paramount Theaters for the theater operations.
- December 21 – Cecil B. DeMille's Samson and Delilah, starring Hedy Lamarr, Victor Mature, George Sanders, Angela Lansbury, and Henry Wilcoxon, receives its televised world premiere at the Paramount and Rivoli theatres in New York City. The film opens in Los Angeles on January 13, 1950, and becomes a massive commercial success. At the 23rd Academy Awards, the film wins the awards for Best Art Direction and Best Costume Design.

== Awards ==
Category/Organization	7th Golden Globe Awards February 23, 1950	22nd Academy Awards March 23, 1950
Best Film	All the King's Men	
Best Director	Robert Rossen; All the King's Men	Joseph L. Mankiewicz; A Letter to Three Wives
Best Actor	Broderick Crawford; All the King's Men	
Best Actress	Olivia de Havilland; The Heiress	
Best Supporting Actor	James Whitmore; Battleground	Dean Jagger; Twelve O'Clock High
Best Supporting Actress	Mercedes McCambridge; All the King's Men	
Best Screenplay, Adapted	Robert Pirosh; Battleground	Joseph L. Mankiewicz; A Letter to Three Wives
Best Screenplay, Original	Robert Pirosh; Battleground	Robert Pirosh; Battleground
Best Foreign Language Film	Bicycle Thieves	

== Top ten money making stars ==
Rank	Actor/Actress
1.	Bob Hope
2.	Bing Crosby
3. (tie)	Bud Abbott; Lou Costello
4.	John Wayne
5.	Gary Cooper
6.	Cary Grant
7.	Betty Grable
8.	Esther Williams
9.	Humphrey Bogart
10.	Clark Gable

== Notable films released in 1949 ==
United States unless stated

=== A ===
- Abbott and Costello Meet the Killer, Boris Karloff, starring Bud Abbott and Lou Costello
- The Accused, starring Loretta Young and Robert Cummings
- Adam's Rib, directed by George Cukor, starring Spencer Tracy, Katharine Hepburn, David Wayne, Tom Ewell, Judy Holliday
- The Adventures of Ichabod and Mr. Toad, narrated by Basil Rathbone and Bing Crosby
- Africa Screams, starring Bud Abbott and Lou Costello
- Alexander Popov, starring Nikolai Cherkasov – (U.S.S.R.)
- Alias Nick Beal, starring Ray Milland and Audrey Totter
- All the King's Men, directed by Robert Rossen, starring Broderick Crawford, John Ireland, Mercedes McCambridge
- Always Leave Them Laughing, starring Milton Berle and Bert Lahr
- Andaz (Style), starring Dilip Kumar and Nargis – (India)
- Any Number Can Play, starring Clark Gable, Alexis Smith, Audrey Totter
- Aventurera (Adventuress) – (Mexico)

=== B ===
- The Bad Lord Byron, starring Dennis Price
- The Barkleys of Broadway, the last of 10 films starring Fred Astaire and Ginger Rogers
- Barsaat (Rain), directed by and starring Raj Kapoor – (India)
- Battleground, starring Van Johnson, Ricardo Montalbán, George Murphy
- The Beautiful Blonde from Bashful Bend, starring Betty Grable
- Begone Dull Care, experimental animated film featuring music of Oscar Peterson – (Canada)
- Beyond the Forest, starring Bette Davis
- The Big Cat, starring Lon McCallister, Preston Foster, Forrest Tucker, Peggy Ann Garner
- The Big Steal, starring Robert Mitchum, Jane Greer, Patric Knowles
- Bitter Rice (Riso Amaro), starring Vittorio Gassman and Silvana Mangano – (Italy)
- The Blue Lagoon, directed by Frank Launder, starring Jean Simmons and Donald Houston – (GB)
- The Blue Swords, directed by Wolfgang Schleif (East Germany)
- Border Incident, starring Ricardo Montalbán
- Boys from the Streets (Gategutter) – (Norway)
- The Bribe, starring Robert Taylor, Ava Gardner, Charles Laughton, Vincent Price, John Hodiak
- Bride for Sale, starring Claudette Colbert and Robert Young

=== C ===
- Canadian Pacific, starring Randolph Scott and Jane Wyatt
- Caught, directed by Max Ophüls, starring Barbara Bel Geddes and Robert Ryan
- Chains (Catene) – (Italy)
- Champion, starring Kirk Douglas, Arthur Kennedy, Marilyn Maxwell
- Chicken Every Sunday, directed by George Seaton, starring Dan Dailey and Celeste Holm
- The Chiltern Hundreds, directed by John Paddy Carstairs – (GB)
- Christopher Columbus, directed by David MacDonald, starring Fredric March – (GB)
- Colorado Territory, directed by Raoul Walsh, starring Joel McCrea and Virginia Mayo
- Come to the Stable, starring Loretta Young and Celeste Holm
- A Connecticut Yankee in King Arthur's Court, starring Bing Crosby and Rhonda Fleming
- Criss Cross, starring Burt Lancaster and Yvonne De Carlo
- The Crooked Way, starring John Payne and Sonny Tufts
- Crows and Sparrows (Wuya yu maque), directed by Zheng Junli – (China)

=== D ===
- Dancing in the Dark, starring William Powell and Betsy Drake
- A Dangerous Profession, starring George Raft and Ella Raines
- Distant Journey (Daleká cesta) – (Czechoslovakia)
- Down to the Sea in Ships, starring Richard Widmark and Lionel Barrymore
- Dulari, starring Madhubala and Geeta Bali (India)

=== E ===
- East Side, West Side, starring Barbara Stanwyck, Ava Gardner, James Mason, Van Heflin, Nancy Davis
- Easy Living, starring Victor Mature and Lucille Ball
- Edward, My Son, directed by George Cukor, starring Spencer Tracy and Deborah Kerr – (U.S./GB)
- The Emperor of Capri (L'imperatore di Capri), directed by Luigi Comencini – (Italy)
- The Emperor's Nightingale (Císařův slavík), an animated film narrated by Boris Karloff – (Czechoslovakia)
- Everybody Does It, starring Paul Douglas and Linda Darnell

=== F ===
- Father Was a Fullback, starring Fred MacMurray
- The Fighting Kentuckian, starring John Wayne and Oliver Hardy
- Flamingo Road, starring Joan Crawford
- Flaxy Martin, starring Virginia Mayo
- The Flirtation of Girls, directed by Anwar Wagdi, starring Naguib El-Rihani and Leila Mourad – (Egypt)
- The Forbidden Street, starring Maureen O'Hara
- For Them That Trespass, directed by Alberto Cavalcanti, starring Richard Todd – (GB)
- The Fountainhead, directed by King Vidor, starring Gary Cooper and Patricia Neal

=== G ===
- Give Us This Day, directed by Edward Dmytryk, starring Sam Wanamaker – (GB)
- The Great Gatsby, starring Alan Ladd, Betty Field, Ruth Hussey
- The Great Madcap (El Gran Calavera), directed by Luis Buñuel, starring Fernando Soler – (Mexico)

=== H ===
- Hardly a Criminal (Apenas un delincuente), directed by Hugo Fregonese – (Argentina)
- The Hasty Heart, starring Ronald Reagan and Patricia Neal – (U.S./GB)
- The Heiress, directed by William Wyler, starring Olivia de Havilland, Montgomery Clift, Miriam Hopkins
- Holiday Affair, starring Robert Mitchum and Janet Leigh
- Home of the Brave, starring Jeff Corey
- House of Strangers, directed by Joseph L. Mankiewicz, starring Edward G. Robinson, Richard Conte, Susan Hayward

=== I ===
- I Married a Communist, starring Laraine Day and Robert Ryan
- I Shot Jesse James, starring Preston Foster and John Ireland
- I Was a Male War Bride, starring Cary Grant
- Impact, starring Brian Donlevy and Ella Raines
- In the Good Old Summertime, starring Judy Garland and Van Johnson
- In the Name of the Law (In nome della legge), directed by Pietro Germi – (Italy)
- The Inspector General, starring Danny Kaye
- The Interrupted Journey, starring Richard Todd and Valerie Hobson – (GB)
- Intruder in the Dust, directed by Clarence Brown
- It Happens Every Spring, starring Ray Milland
- It's Not Cricket directed by Alfred Roome, starring Basil Radford and Naunton Wayne – (GB)

=== J ===
- Janika – (Hungary)
- Johnny Stool Pigeon, starring Shelley Winters and Howard Duff
- Jolson Sings Again, starring Larry Parks and Barbara Hale
- Jour de fête (Festival Day), directed by and starring Jacques Tati – (France)

=== K ===
- Kind Hearts and Coronets, directed by Robert Hamer, starring Alec Guinness, Dennis Price, Valerie Hobson – (GB)
- A Kiss in the Dark, starring Jane Wyman and David Niven
- Knock on Any Door, directed by Nicholas Ray, starring Humphrey Bogart

=== L ===
- Late Spring (Banshun), directed by Yasujirō Ozu – (Japan)
- Life (Vazhkai), directed by A. V. Meiyappan, starring Vyjayanthimala in her screen debut – (India)
- A Letter to Three Wives, directed by Joseph L. Mankiewicz, starring Jeanne Crain, Linda Darnell, Ann Sothern, Paul Douglas, Kirk Douglas
- Little Women, directed by Mervyn LeRoy, starring June Allyson, Peter Lawford, Margaret O'Brien, Elizabeth Taylor, Janet Leigh, Mary Astor
- Love Happy, starring the Marx Brothers
- The Lucky Stiff, starring Dorothy Lamour and Claire Trevor
- Lust for Gold, starring Ida Lupino and Glenn Ford

=== M ===
- Ma and Pa Kettle, starring Marjorie Main and Percy Kilbride
- Madame Bovary, starring Jennifer Jones and James Mason
- Mahal (The Mansion), starring Ashok Kumar and Madhubala – (India)
- Malaya, starring Spencer Tracy and James Stewart
- La Malquerida (The Bad Mistress), starring Dolores del Río and Pedro Armendáriz – (Mexico)
- The Man from Colorado, starring Glenn Ford and William Holden
- Manhandled, starring Dorothy Lamour, Dan Duryea, Sterling Hayden
- Manon, directed by Henri-Georges Clouzot – (France)
- The Marriage of Figaro (Figaros Hochzeit) – (East Germany)
- Mighty Joe Young, directed by Ernest B. Schoedsack, starring Terry Moore and Ben Johnson
- Miss Mink of 1949, starring Lois Collier
- Mother Is a Freshman, starring Loretta Young and Van Johnson
- My Foolish Heart, starring Susan Hayward and Dana Andrews
- My Friend Irma, film debut of Dean Martin and Jerry Lewis

=== N ===
- Neptune's Daughter, starring Esther Williams
- Never Fear, directed by Ida Lupino, starring Sally Forrest and Hugh O'Brian
- Night Unto Night, directed by Don Siegel, starring Ronald Reagan
- No Way Back, starring Terence De Marney, Eleanor Summerfield – (GB)

=== O ===
- Obsession, directed by Edward Dmytryk, starring Robert Newton – (GB)
- Oh, You Beautiful Doll, starring June Haver
- On the Town, starring Gene Kelly, Frank Sinatra, Vera-Ellen, Ann Miller, Betty Garrett

=== P ===
- The Passionate Friends, directed by David Lean, starring Ann Todd and Claude Rains – (GB)
- Passport to Pimlico, starring Stanley Holloway and Margaret Rutherford – (GB)
- Pinky, starring Jeanne Crain
- Prince of Foxes, starring Tyrone Power and Orson Welles
- Prison (Fängelse), directed by Ingmar Bergman – (Sweden)

=== Q ===
- The Queen of Spades, starring Anton Walbrook and Edith Evans – (GB)
- The Quiet Duel (Shizukanaru Ketto), starring Toshiro Mifune – (Japan)

=== R ===
- The Reckless Moment, starring James Mason and Joan Bennett
- Red, Hot and Blue, starring Betty Hutton and Victor Mature
- Red Light, starring George Raft and Virginia Mayo
- The Red Pony, starring Myrna Loy and Robert Mitchum
- The Rocking Horse Winner, starring Valerie Hobson and John Howard Davies – (GB)
- Rope of Sand, starring Burt Lancaster, Paul Henreid, Claude Rains
- Rotation (Sowjetische Zone) – (East Germany)
- A Run for Your Money, starring Donald Houston, Moira Lister, Alec Guinness – (GB)
- Rustlers, starring Tim Holt and Martha Hyer

=== S ===
- Samson and Delilah, directed by Cecil B. DeMille, starring Hedy Lamarr and Victor Mature
- Sands of Iwo Jima, directed by Allan Dwan, starring John Wayne
- The Secret Garden, starring Margaret O'Brien and Herbert Marshall
- The Set-Up, starring Robert Ryan
- She Wore a Yellow Ribbon, starring John Wayne, Joanne Dru, Ben Johnson
- Shockproof, starring Cornel Wilde
- Une si jolie petite plage (Such a Pretty Little Beach), directed by Yves Allégret – (France)
- Le Silence de la mer, directed by Jean-Pierre Melville – (France)
- Slattery's Hurricane, starring Richard Widmark, Veronica Lake, Linda Darnell
- The Small Back Room, directed by Michael Powell and Emeric Pressburger – (GB)
- Sons of Matthew (aka The Rugged O'Riordans) – (Australia)
- Sorrowful Jones, starring Bob Hope and Lucille Ball
- South of St. Louis, starring Joel McCrea and Alexis Smith
- The Stratton Story, starring James Stewart and June Allyson
- Stray Dog (Nora inu), directed by Akira Kurosawa, starring Toshiro Mifune – (Japan)
- Streets of Laredo, starring William Holden, Macdonald Carey, William Bendix
- The Sun Comes Up, starring Jeanette MacDonald, Lloyd Nolan, Lassie

=== T ===
- Take One False Step, starring Shelley Winters and William Powell
- Tension, starring Richard Basehart, Audrey Totter, Cyd Charisse
- That Dangerous Age, starring Myrna Loy and Peggy Cummins – (GB)
- That Forsyte Woman, starring Greer Garson and Walter Pidgeon
- That Midnight Kiss, starring Kathryn Grayson and Mario Lanza
- Thieves' Highway, directed by Jules Dassin, starring Richard Conte
- The Third Man, directed by Carol Reed, starring Joseph Cotten, Alida Valli, Trevor Howard, Orson Welles – (GB)
- Too Late for Tears, starring Lizabeth Scott and Dan Duryea
- Train of Events, starring Valerie Hobson, Jack Warner, Peter Finch – (GB)
- Tulsa, starring Susan Hayward and Robert Preston
- Twelve O'Clock High, starring Gregory Peck

=== U ===
- Under Capricorn, directed by Alfred Hitchcock, starring Ingrid Bergman – (GB)
- The Undercover Man, starring Glenn Ford and Nina Foch

=== W ===
- Waga koi wa moenu (Flame of My Love), directed by Kenji Mizoguchi – (Japan)
- The Walls of Malapaga (Au-delà des grilles), directed by René Clément, starring Jean Gabin – (France/Italy)
- We Were Strangers, starring Jennifer Jones and John Garfield
- Whirlpool, directed by Otto Preminger, starring Gene Tierney
- Whisky Galore!, directed by Alexander Mackendrick (debut), starring Basil Radford and Joan Greenwood – (GB)
- White Heat, directed by Raoul Walsh, starring James Cagney, Virginia Mayo, Edmond O'Brien
- The Window, starring Barbara Hale and Arthur Kennedy
- Without Honor, starring Laraine Day
- Women Side by Side, directed by Chen Liting, starring Shangguan Yunzhu and Zhao Dan – (China)

=== Y ===
- You, the Rich (Ustedes los ricos), starring Pedro Infante – (Mexico)
- You're My Everything, directed by Walter Lang, starring Dan Dailey and Anne Baxter

== Serials ==
- Adventures of Sir Galahad, starring George Reeves and Charles King
- Batman and Robin, starring Robert Lowery
- Bruce Gentry, starring Tom Neal
- Federal Agents vs. Underworld, Inc, starring Kirk Alyn and Rosemary LaPlanche
- Ghost of Zorro, starring Clayton Moore and Pamela Blake
- The James Brothers of Missouri, starring Keith Richards and Noel Neill
- King of the Rocket Men, starring Tristram Coffin and Mae Clarke
- Radar Patrol vs Spy King, starring Kirk Alyn

== Short film series ==
- Mickey Mouse (1928–1953)
- Looney Tunes (1930–1969)
- Merrie Melodies (1931–1969)
- Popeye (1933–1957)
- Color Rhapsodies (1934–1949)
- The Three Stooges (1934–1959)
- Donald Duck (1934–1956)
- Pluto (1937–1951)
- Chip and Dale (1943–1956)
- Andy Panda (1939–1949)
- Goofy (1939–1953)
- Tom and Jerry (1940–1958)
- The Fox and the Crow (1941–1950)
- Woody Woodpecker (1941–1949)
- Mighty Mouse (1942–1955)
- Droopy (1943–1958)
- Blackie the Sheep (1947–1949)
- Red Hot Riding Hood (1943–1949)
- Jan Wickman Shorts (1949–1994)
- Noveltoons (1943–1967)

== Births ==
- January 1 – Mbissine Thérèse Diop, Senegalese actress
- January 6 – Rudolf van den Berg, Dutch director and screenwriter (died 2025)
- January 7
  - George Buza, American-born Canadian actor
  - Steven Williams, American actor
- January 9 – Vincent Grass, Belgian actor
- January 12 – Wayne Wang, Hong Kong-born director
- January 14 – Lawrence Kasdan, American director and screenwriter
- January 17 – Andy Kaufman, American actor and comedian (died 1984)
- January 24 – John Belushi, American actor and comedian (died 1982)
- January 26 – David Strathairn, American actor
- January 27 – Zbigniew Rybczyński, Polish film and video cinematographer and director
- February 2
  - Jack McGee, American actor
  - Brent Spiner, American actor, comedian and musician
- February 6 - Jim Sheridan, Irish filmmaker
- February 8
  - Brooke Adams, American actress
  - Niels Arestrup, French-Danish actor, director and screenwriter (died 2024)
- February 9 – Judith Light, American actress
- February 16 – Marc de Jonge, French actor (died 1996)
- February 27 - Debra Monk, American actress, singer and writer
- March 1 - Tom Mason, American actor
- March 2 – Gates McFadden, American actress
- March 3
  - Gloria Hendry, American actress and former model
  - Sandy Martin, American actress, director and producer
- March 9 - Lizbeth MacKay, American actress
- March 12 – Rob Cohen, American director, producer and writer
- March 16
  - Erik Estrada, American actor and police officer
  - Victor Garber, Canadian actor
  - Joseph Pilato, American actor (died 2019)
- March 22 – Fanny Ardant, French actress
- March 28
  - Josephine Chaplin, American actress (died 2023)
  - Masatō Ibu, Japanese actor
- March 31 – Regina Baff, American actress
- April 2
  - Ron Palillo, American actor (died 2012)
  - Pamela Reed, American actress
- April 5 – John Berg, American actor (died 2007)
- April 8 – John Madden, English director
- April 9 – Sorcha Cusack, Irish actress
- April 11 – Bernd Eichinger, German producer, director and screenwriter (died 2011)
- April 14 – John Shea, American actor
- April 20
  - Jessica Lange, American actress
  - Veronica Cartwright, English-born actress
- April 21 – Patti LuPone, American actress and singer
- April 24 – Peter Friedman, American actor
- April 26 – Dominic Sena, American director
- April 28
  - Paul Guilfoyle, American actor
  - Bruno Kirby, American actor, singer, voice artist and comedian (died 2006)
- April 29 - Anita Dobson, English actress and singer
- May 3 – Ron Canada, American actor
- May 7 – Marilyn Burns, American actress (died 2014)
- May 8 - Rockets Redglare, American character actor and stand-up comedian (died 2001)
- May 10 – Walter von Hauff, German actor
- May 13
  - Franklyn Ajaye, American stand-up comedian, actor and writer
  - Zoë Wanamaker, American-born British actress
- May 18
  - Marco Perella, American character actor
  - Hubert Saint-Macary, French actor
- May 20 – Dave Thomas, Canadian comedian, actor and television writer
- May 21 – Will Ryan, American voice actor, singer and musician (died 2021)
- May 22 – Cheryl Campbell, English actress
- May 24 – Jim Broadbent, British actor
- May 25 – Joe Unger, American actor
- May 26
  - Pam Grier, American actress
  - Tom McCleister, American actor
  - Philip Michael Thomas, American actor and musician
- May 28 – Sandy Helberg, German-born American actor
- May 29 – Cotter Smith, American actor
- May 31 – Tom Berenger, American actor
- June 3 - John Rothman, American actor
- June 5 – Guts Ishimatsu, Japanese actor and comedian
- June 10 – Frankie Faison, American actor
- June 11 – Sherman Howard, American actor
- June 12 – Roger Aaron Brown, American character actor
- June 14 – Antony Sher, British actor (died 2021)
- June 15
  - Simon Callow, English actor, director and writer
  - Richard Henzel, American actor
  - Jim Varney, American actor and comedian (died 2000)
- June 16 – Geoff Pierson, American actor
- June 18 - Mac McDonald, American actor
- June 22 – Meryl Streep, American actress
- June 23 - Lauren Shuler Donner, American producer
- June 29
  - Roger Allers, American director, screenwriter, animator and storyboard artist (died 2026)
  - Greg Burson, American voice actor (died 2008)
- July 3 – Masato Harada, Japanese director, film critic and actor (died 2025)
- July 5 – Ed O'Ross, American actor
- July 7 – Shelley Duvall, American actress (died 2024)
- July 12
  - Diana Hardcastle, English actress
  - Bernice Stegers, English actress
- July 24 – Michael Richards, American actor, writer and producer, previously comedian
- July 27
  - Maury Chaykin, American-Canadian actor (died 2010)
  - Susan Gordon, American child actress (died 2011)
- July 28 – Randall Wallace, American screenwriter, director and producer
- July 29 - Ryan Cutrona, American actor
- August 2 – Madeline Smith, English actress
- August 3 – Philip Casnoff, American actor
- August 5 - Penne Hackforth-Jones, Australian actress (died 2013)
- August 8 – Keith Carradine, American actor
- August 11 – Ian Charleson, Scottish actor (died 1990)
- August 15 – Phyllis Smith, American actress
- August 17 – Julian Fellowes, English actor, writer, director and screenwriter
- August 20 – Patrick Kilpatrick, American actor, director and screenwriter
- August 21 – Loretta Devine, American actress
- August 23 – Shelley Long, American actress
- August 24 – Joe Regalbuto, American actor and director
- August 25 – John Savage, American actor
- August 31
  - Richard Gere, American actor
  - Stephen McKinley Henderson, American actor
- September 1 – Luminița Gheorghiu, Romanian actress (died 2021)
- September 4 – Eero Spriit, Estonian actor and producer
- September 5 – Steve Sweeney, American comedian and actor
- September 13 – Burghart Klaußner, German actor
- September 16 – Ed Begley, Jr., American actor
- September 18 – Beth Grant, American character actress
- September 19 – Ernie Sabella, American actor
- September 21 - Yūsaku Matsuda, Japanese actor (died 1989)
- September 25
  - Pedro Almodóvar, Spanish director
  - Caroline Kava, American actress
- October 2 – Larry Sellers, Osage-American actor and stuntman (died 2021)
- October 4 – Armand Assante, American actor
- October 8
  - Maggie Ollerenshaw, English actress
  - Sigourney Weaver, American actress
- October 10 – Jessica Harper, American actress
- October 13 – Tarık Akan, Turkish actor and activist (d. 2016)
- October 15 – Tanya Roberts, American actress (died 2021)
- October 19
  - Christopher Adamson, British actor (died 2025)
  - George Fenton, British theme music composer (died 2026)
- October 20 – George Harris, British actor
- October 21 – LaTanya Richardson Jackson, American actress
- October 25
  - Brian Kerwin, American actor
  - Ross Bagdasarian Jr., American actor, singer, animator and producer
- October 30 – Leon Rippy, American character actor
- November 1 – Jeannie Berlin, American actress and screenwriter
- November 6 – Brad Davis, American actor (died 1991)
- November 7
  - Terry Camilleri, Australian actor
  - Ben Guillory, American actor and director
- November 10 – Ann Reinking, American actress and singer (died 2020)
- November 14 – Gary Grubbs, American character actor
- November 17 – Jon Avnet, American director, writer and producer
- November 19 - Nigel Bennett, English-born Canadian actor, director and writer
- November 27
  - Chris Ellis, American actor
  - Gerrit Graham, American actor (died 2026)
  - Arlene Klasky, American animator, graphic designer, producer and co-founder of Klasky Csupo
- November 28
  - Alexander Godunov, Russian-American film actor (died 1995)
  - Paul Shaffer, Canadian singer, composer, actor and musician
- November 29 – Garry Shandling, American stand-up comedian, actor, director, writer and producer (died 2016)
- November 30
  - Don "Magic" Juan, American actor
  - Margaret Whitton, American actress (died 2016)
  - Nicholas Woodeson, English actor
- December 3 – Heather Menzies, Canadian-American actress (died 2017)
- December 4 – Jeff Bridges, American actor
- December 5 – Pamela Blair, American actress (died 2023)
- December 7 – Tom Waits, American musician and actor
- December 8 – Nancy Meyers, American filmmaker
- December 10 – Enrique Castillo, American actor, writer, director and producer
- December 12 – Bill Nighy, British actor
- December 13 – Robert Lindsay, English actor
- December 15 – Don Johnson, American actor
- December 16 - Allan Graf, American athlete, actor, stuntman and director
- December 18 – Kai Wulff, German-born American actor
- December 19
  - Marlene Clark, American actress (died 2023)
  - Nancy Kyes, American former actress
  - Kjell Nilsson, Swedish actor (died 2026)
  - Rita Taggart, American actress
- December 21 – Michael Horse, American actor
- December 22 – Graham Beckel, American character actor
- December 25 – Sissy Spacek, American actress
- December 28 – Hilton McRae, Scottish actor

== Deaths ==
- January 6 – Victor Fleming, 59, American director and producer, The Wizard of Oz, Gone With the Wind, Captains Courageous, Dr. Jekyll and Mr. Hyde
- January 19 – William Wright, 38, American actor, Philo Vance Returns, Eve Knew Her Apples
- January 20 – Nora Gregor, 47, Austrian actress, The Rules of the Game, But the Flesh Is Weak
- February 19 – Jean Gillie, 33, English actress, Decoy
- March 16 – Leyland Hodgson, 56, English actor, Under Nevada Skies, Kiss the Blood Off My Hands
- April 15 – Wallace Beery, 64, American actor, Grand Hotel, The Champ, Robin Hood, Viva Villa!
- April 18 – Will Hay, 60, English comedian, actor and director, Oh, Mr. Porter!, Hey! Hey! USA
- April 22 – Charles B. Middleton, 74, American actor (born 1874), Flash Gordon
- August 9 – Harry Davenport, 83, American actor (born 1866), Gone with the Wind, The Ox-Bow Incident
- September 4 – Olof Ås, 56, Swedish actor, stage manager (born 1892)
- September 10 – Robert Middlemass, 66, American playwright, actor, (born 1883), Lady in the Death House, A Sporting Chance
- September 14 – Romuald Joubé, 73, French actor (born 1876)
- September 18 – Frank Morgan, 59, American actor (born 1890), The Wizard of Oz
- September 20 – Richard Dix, 56, American actor (born 1893), Cimarron, Redskin
- October 14 – Fritz Leiber, Sr., 67, American actor (born 1882)
- October 22 – Craig Reynolds, 42, American actor (born 1907), Gold Mine in the Sky, Slander House
- November 25 – Bill Robinson, 72, American dancer and actor (born 1878), Stormy Weather, The Little Colonel
- November 27 – Tom Walls, 66, English actor and director (born 1883), Stormy Weather, Lady in Danger
- December 16 – Sidney Olcott, 76, Canadian-born American film director (born 1873)
- December 31 – Howard Hickman, 69, American actor, director, writer (born 1880), The Kansas Terrors, Gone with the Wind

== Film debuts ==
- Joss Ackland – Landfall
- Julie Adams – Red, Hot and Blue
- Dorothy Alison – Eureka Stockade
- Edward Andrews – Adam's Rib
- Julie Andrews – The Singing Princess
- Val Avery – Rope of Sand
- Keiko Awaji – Stray Dog
- Jim Backus – One Last Fling
- Neville Brand – Battleground
- Robert Brown – The Third Man
- Yul Brynner – Port of New York
- Richard Burton – The Last Days of Dolwyn
- Ernest Clark – Private Angelo
- Ben Cooper – Side Street
- Adrienne Corri – The Romantic Age
- Michael Craig – Passport to Pimlico
- Tony Curtis – Criss Cross
- Basil Dignam – Maytime in Mayfair
- Robert Easton – Undertow
- James Edwards – The Set-Up
- Richard Egan – The Story of Molly X
- Denholm Elliott – Dear Mr. Prohack
- Jacques Fabbri – Rendezvous in July
- Bryan Forbes – The Small Back Room
- Michel Galabru – Dernière heure, édition spéciale
- Eddie Garcia – Kahit ang mundo'y magunaw
- Beverly Garland – D.O.A.
- Alexander Gauge – The Interrupted Journey
- Frank Gerstle – D.O.A.
- Walter Giller – Artistenblut
- Michael Goodliffe – The Small Back Room
- Tom Greenway – Impact
- Margaretha Krook – Only a Mother
- Jack Kruschen – Red, Hot and Blue
- Lloyd Lamble – Strong Is the Seed
- Jack Lemmon – The Lady Takes a Sailor
- Jerry Lewis – My Friend Irma
- Dean Martin – My Friend Irma
- Pierre Mondy – Rendezvous in July
- Jeanne Moreau – Last Love
- Patricia Neal – John Loves Mary
- Nimmi – Barsaat
- Hubert Noël – Forbidden to the Public
- Philippe Noiret – Gigi
- George Pastell – Give Us This Day
- Ford Rainey – White Heat
- Edwin Richfield – The Jack of Diamonds
- Yves Robert – Les dieux du dimanche
- Kasey Rogers – Special Agent
- Maurice Ronet – Rendezvous in July
- Vito Scotti – Criss Cross
- Anne Seymour – All the King's Men
- Harold J. Stone – The Set-Up
- William Sylvester – Give Us This Day
- Joe Turkel – City Across the River
- Renata Vanni – El Paso
- Richard Vernon – Stop Press Girl
- Max von Sydow – Only a Mother
- Carol White – Kind Hearts and Coronets
- James Whitmore – The Undercover Man
