= 1949 in British television =

This is a list of British television related events from 1949.

== Events ==
=== April ===
- 23 April - The first FA Amateur Cup Final staged at Wembley is also the first to be televised. The whole match is shown on the BBC, with Bromley beating Romford 1-0.

=== July ===
- July – BBC Television revives the regular televised weather forecast.
- July 11–14 – The first film made specifically for British television, A Dinner Date With Death, is shot at Marylebone Studios in London, featuring Roy Plomley. It is broadcast in 1950.

=== October ===
- 26 October – How Do You View?, a sitcom starring Terry-Thomas, is first broadcast.

=== December ===
- 17 December – The Sutton Coldfield television transmitter is opened in the Midlands, making it the first part of the country outside London to receive the BBC Television Service.
- 31 December – BBC Television ends the day with a brief live broadcast of twenty sleeping babies in St Thomas' Hospital, London.

== Debuts ==
- 25 January – The Time Machine (1949)
- 10 June – Triple Bill (1949) (trio of plays: Witness For the Prosecution; The Call To Arms; and Box For One)
- 26 October – How Do You View? (1949–1953)
- 27 November – By Candlelight (1949)
- 25 December – Miranda (1949)

== Continuing television shows ==
=== 1920s ===
- BBC Wimbledon (1927–1939, 1946–2019, 2021–present)

=== 1930s ===
- Picture Page (1936–1939, 1946–1952)
- For the Children (1937–1939, 1946–1952)
- Trooping the Colour (1937–1939, 1946–2019, 2023–present)
- The Boat Race (1938–1939, 1946–2019, 2021–present)
- BBC Cricket (1939, 1946–1999, 2020–2024)

=== 1940s ===
- Kaleidoscope (1946–1953)
- Muffin the Mule (1946–1955, 2005–2006)
- Café Continental (1947–1953)
- Television Newsreel (1948–1954)
- The Ed Sullivan Show (1948–1971)

== Births ==
- 13 March – David Neilson, actor
- 30 March – Sue Cook, broadcaster and author
- 11 April – David Stafford, writer and broadcaster (died 2023)
- 29 April – Anita Dobson, actress
- 2 May – Alan Titchmarsh, gardener and television presenter
- 13 May – Zoë Wanamaker, American-born actress
- 21 May – Andrew Neil, Scottish journalist and broadcaster
- 22 May – Cheryl Campbell, film, television and stage actor
- 16 August – John McArdle, actor
- 25 August – Ross Davidson, actor (died 2006)
- 2 September – Moira Stuart, broadcast presenter
- 10 September – Freddy Marks, actor, singer and musician (died 2021)
- 19 September – Twiggy, model and television presenter
- 23 September – Floella Benjamin, Trinidad-born children's TV presenter and actress
- 6 October – Sarah Cullen, television and radio journalist (died 2012)
- 19 October – George Fenton, theme music composer (died 2026)
- 20 October – Jane Tucker, actress, singer and musician
- 7 November – Su Pollard, actress and singer
- 12 December – Bill Nighy, actor
- 13 December – Robert Lindsay, actor

== Deaths ==
- 10 June – Sir Frederick Ogilvie, Director General of the BBC, aged 57

== See also ==
- 1949 in British music
- 1949 in the United Kingdom
- List of British films of 1949
