= Isabella Riva =

Italian actress

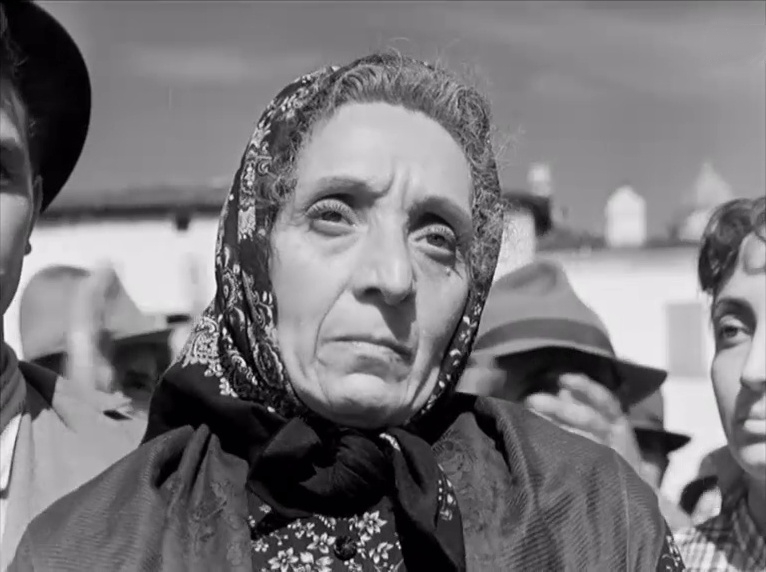
- Isabella Riva in The Mill on the Po (1949)
- Born: Isabella Trufarelli; 22 April 1887; Nizza Monferrato, Asti
- Died: 10 August 1985 (aged 98); Bologna
- Occupation: actress

Isabella Riva (22 April 1887 - 10 August 1985) was an Italian actress.

Born in Nizza Monferrato, Asti as Isabella Trufarelli, daughter of actors, Riva began acting as a child in the stage company ran by her grandparents. After working in several companies, in 1919 she became main actress of the Alfredo Sainati stage company. She was also a film and television actress.

Riva retired in 1968, moving to Bologna in the retirement home for actors "Lyda Borelli" where she continued to teach acting for several years.

== Selected filmography ==
- Snow White and the Seven Thieves (1949)
- The Mill on the Po (1949)
- The Angel of the Alps (1957)
