= Snow White and the Seven Thieves =

- Directed by: Giacomo Gentilomo
- Written by: Marcello Marchesi; Giacomo Gentilomo; Vittorio Metz; Ernesto Grassi
- Starring: Peppino De Filippo; Mischa Auer; Silvana Pampanini; Luigi Pavese; Franca Maresa; Gino Saltamerenda; Laura Carli; Giacomo Furia; Isabella Riva; Lidia Martora; Lamberto Picasso; Vittorio Sanipoli; Laura Rossi
- Cinematography: Clemente Santoni
- Edited by: Mario Serandrei
- Production company: Ferrara Cesi Filippone (F.C.F.) Produzione Cinematografica Associata E.N.I.C.
- Distributed by: Miramax (International)
- Release date: 1949
- Country: Italy

Snow White and the Seven Thieves (Italian: Biancaneve e i sette ladri) is a 1949 Italian comedy film directed by Giacomo Gentilomo. It is loosely based on the novella Il ladro by Anton Germano Rossi.

== Plot ==
In a half-deserted Milan on the day of Ferragosto, a bizarre mechanical indicator tells a passerby the story of a bank employee, Peppino Biancaneve, who, with the help of a disc, is trying to put together the words he would like to use to ask for the hand of the daughter of the jeweler Carlo Casertoni. But while he is mulling over the sentences he should pronounce to his future father-in-law, he comes across a strange individual who could be a bringer of bad luck: a jinx.

Snow White finds confirmation shortly afterward, when she realizes her car has been robbed. She joins a group chasing the alleged thief, Mirko, and ends up arrested and taken to the police station. From there, with the thief's help, she manages to escape and reach the jeweler's house. Mirko poses as a doctor before the jeweler and is invited on a trip to the Brianza countryside, to Casertoni's villa.

The thief's companions, seeing him pass by, decide to follow him along with Eleonora, Mirko's girlfriend. Arriving at the jeweler's residence, the gang of crooks decides to pull off a major heist by opening the jeweler's safe. But after some dramatic scenes, Peppino manages to have the entire gang arrested and finally fulfills his dream of an engagement.

== Cast ==
- Peppino De Filippo: Peppino Biancaneve
- Mischa Auer: Mirko aka Dr. Lebovich
- Silvana Pampanini: Eleonora
- Luigi Pavese: Commendator Carlo Casertoni
- Franca Maresa: Nella Casertoni
- Gino Saltamerenda: Zefirino Dossetti
- Laura Carli: Laura
- Giacomo Furia: Brigadier
- Isabella Riva: Maid
- Lidia Martora: Robbed Woman
- Lamberto Picasso: Husband of the Robbed Woman
- Vittorio Sanipoli: Chaser of Mirko
- Luisa Rossi: Woman at Tavernetta
