= Laura Carli =

Italian actress and dubber

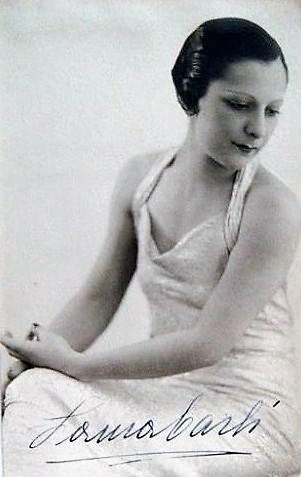
- Born: 29 May 1906; Forlì, Italy
- Died: 15 August 2005 (aged 99); Forlì, Italy
- Occupations: Actress, dubber
- Years active: 1944-1974

Laura Carli (29 May 1906 – 15 August 2005) was an Italian actress and dubber. She appeared in more than thirty films from 1944 to 1974.

== Selected filmography ==
Year	Title	Role	Notes
1947	The Courier of the King		
1947	The Brothers Karamazov		
1950	Snow White and the Seven Thieves		
1951	Last Meeting		
1952	Five Paupers in an Automobile		
1953	Perdonami!		
1956	Wives and Obscurities		
1957	Vacanze a Ischia		
1959	Vacations in Majorca		
1960	The Cossacks		
1961	Wise Guys		
