= My Beautiful Daughter =

- Directed by: Duilio Coletti
- Cinematography: Mario Bava
- Edited by: Marino Girolami
- Music by: Felice Montagnini
- Release date: 1950
- Country: Italy
- Language: Italian

My Beautiful Daughter (Italian: Miss Italia) is a 1950 Italian comedy film directed by Duilio Coletti.

== Cast ==
- Gina Lollobrigida: Lisetta Minneci
- Richard Ney: Massimo Lega
- Constance Dowling: Lilly
- Luisa Rossi: Gabriella
- Carlo Campanini: Don Fernando
- Luigi Almirante: Cav. Minneci
- Umberto Melnati: "Fotoromanzo" Director
- Marisa Vernati: Stena Randi
- Mario Besesti: Sindaco Favarelli
- Mino Doro: Guidi
- Lilia Landi: Carla
- Carlo Hintermann: Livio Toschi
- Mirella Uberti: Lucia
- Dina Perbellini: Miss Favarelli
- Odoardo Spadaro: Master of ceremonies
- Enrico Luzi: Sacerdote
- Silvio Bagolini: Photographer
