= A Matter of Murder =

- Directed by: John Gilling
- Written by: John Gilling
- Produced by: Sam Lee; Roger Proudlock
- Starring: Maureen Riscoe; John Barry; Charles Clapham; Ivan Craig
- Cinematography: S.D. Onions
- Music by: George Melachrino
- Production company: Vandyke Productions
- Distributed by: Grand National Pictures
- Release date: December 1949
- Running time: 59 minutes
- Country: United Kingdom
- Language: English

A Matter of Murder is a 1949 British second feature ('B') crime film directed and written by John Gilling and starring Maureen Riscoe, John Barry, Charles Clapham, Ian Fleming and John Le Mesurier.

== Plot ==
Mild-mannered bank clerk Geoffrey Dent is persuaded by his nagging, gold-digging girlfriend, Laura, to embezzle money. When an attempt is made on Laura's life, Geoffrey runs away with the cash to avoid being blamed. With the killer and a detective hot on his heels, Geoffrey hides out in a Cheltenham boarding house, where he becomes the murderer's next intended victim.

== Cast ==
- John Barry as Geoffrey Dent
- Maureen Riscoe as Julie McKelvin
- Charles Clapham as Col Peabody
- Ivan Craig as Tony
- Ian Fleming as Det Sgt McKelvin
- John Le Mesurier as Ginter
- Sonya O'Shea as Laura Wilson
- Peter Madren as Sgt Bex
- Sam Lee as Cullen
- Blanche Fothergill as Miss Budge
- Tony Doonan as Suspect (uncredited)

== Production ==
The film was made by Vandyke Productions at Viking Studios, and on location at a former girls' school in Kensington dressed as a boarding house, and Paddington Station.

== Reception ==
Kine Weekly wrote: "Stilted acting and dialogue remove the edge from many intended thrills. Very moderate quota offering."

Picturegoer wrote: "Characters are drawn from stock, with a provincial boarding house setting, and the drama as a whole is most ingenuous. Maureen Riscoe is quite good as the heroine, but the rest of the cast hardly comes up to scratch."

In British Sound Films: The Studio Years 1928–1959 David Quinlan rated the film as "mediocre", writing: "Tatty programme-filler."
