= 1949 in British music =

This is a summary of 1949 in music in the United Kingdom.

== Events ==
- February – On hearing of the death of Ernest Walker, Albert Schweitzer writes: "Now the dear, gentle, kind, distinguished Dr. Walker has left this life. Seeing him impressed me deeply each time."
- 14 July – Kathleen Ferrier performs in the world premiere of Benjamin Britten's Spring Symphony in Amsterdam, with Eduard van Beinum and the Concertgebouw Orchestra, a work written specifically for her.
- 5 September – Wagnerian tenor Walter Widdop makes his last appearance at The Proms, singing an aria from Lohengrin, only one day before his sudden death.
- date unknown – The Tempo Records jazz record label is founded by Colin Pomroy, Jack Clough, and R.E.G. (Ron) Davies.

== Popular music ==
- "Snowy White Snow and Jingle Bells" by Billy Reid, performed by Dorothy Squires
- "The Wedding of Lili Marlene" by Tommie Connor

== Classical music: new works ==
- Malcolm Arnold – Symphony No. 1
- Havergal Brian – Symphony No. 8 in B flat Minor
- Benjamin Britten – Spring Symphony
- William Walton – Sonata for violin and piano (written for Yehudi Menuhin and Louis Kentner)

== Opera ==
- Benjamin Britten – Let's Make an Opera (The Little Sweep)
- Ralph Vaughan Williams – The Pilgrim's Progress (original version)

== Film and Incidental music ==
- Richard Addinsell – The Passionate Friends directed by David Lean.
- Arthur Bliss – Christopher Columbus, starring Fredric March.
- Ernest Irving –
  - Kind Hearts and Coronets, starring Alec Guinness.
  - A Run for Your Money, starring Donald Houston and Meredith Edwards.
  - Whisky Galore! directed by Alexander Mackendrick, starring Basil Radford, Bruce Seton, Joan Greenwood and Gordon Jackson.

== Musical theatre ==
- 22 June – Her Excellency starring Cicely Courtneidge opens at the London Hippodrome
- 15 September – King's Rhapsody, with music by Ivor Novello and lyrics by Christopher Hassall, opens at the Palace Theatre, London.

== Musical films ==
- Maytime in Mayfair, starring Anna Neagle
- Melody in the Dark, starring Eunice Gayson
- Trottie True, starring Jean Kent and Hugh Sinclair

== Births ==
- 4 January – Margaret Anne Marshall, Scottish soprano
- 19 January – Robert Palmer, singer (died 2003)
- 22 January – Phil Miller, English guitarist
- 6 February – Mike Batt, singer and composer
- 7 February – Alan Lancaster, bass player (Status Quo and The Party Boys)
- 16 February – Lyn Paul, English singer and actress (The New Seekers)
- 26 February – Dame Emma Kirkby, soprano
- 24 March – Nick Lowe, singer-songwriter
- 11 April – Lee Sheriden, singer with Brotherhood of Man
- 13 May – Jane Glover, conductor
- 18 May – Rick Wakeman, multi-instrumentalist and composer
- 21 May – Rosalind Plowright, operatic mezzo-soprano
- 14 June – Alan White, rock drummer (Yes) (died 2022)
- 17 June – Snakefinger, English singer-songwriter and guitarist (The Residents and Chilli Willi and the Red Hot Peppers) (died 1987)
- 24 June – John Illsley, singer-songwriter, bass player and producer (Dire Straits)
- 3 July – John Verity, guitarist (Argent)
- 12 July – John Wetton, bass guitarist (King Crimson, Roxy Music)
- 15 July
  - John Casken, composer
  - Trevor Horn, record producer, songwriter, musician and singer, sometimes called "The Man Who Invented the Eighties".
- 17 July
  - Geezer Butler, heavy metal bass player and songwriter (Black Sabbath, Geezer Butler Band, GZR, and Heaven & Hell)
  - Wayne Sleep, actor, dancer and choreographer
- 28 July – Simon Kirke, rock drummer (Bad Company and Free)
- 12 August
  - Mark Knopfler, singer-songwriter, guitarist and composer
  - Lou Martin, Irish-English pianist, songwriter and producer (died 2012)
- 28 August – Hugh Cornwell, rock singer-songwriter (The Stranglers)
- 30 September – Eleanor Alberga, composer
- 1 October – Allan Barty, folk musician (died 2008)
- 19 October – George Fenton, theme music composer (died 2026)
- 23 October – Würzel (Michael Burston), heavy metal guitarist (Motörhead) (died 2011)
- 29 October – David Paton, guitarist and singer-songwriter
- 2 November – Frankie Miller, rock singer-songwriter
- 23 November – Sandra Stevens, singer with Brotherhood of Man
- 26 November – Martin Lee, singer with Brotherhood of Man
- 3 December – Nicky Stevens, singer with Brotherhood of Man
- 5 December – John Altman, film composer, arranger and conductor
- 8 December – Ray Shulman, violinist, guitarist and producer
- 17 December – Paul Rodgers, rock vocalist
- 22 December – Robin Gibb (died 2012) and Maurice Gibb (died 2003), Manx-born pop musicians (Bee Gees)

== Deaths ==
- 11 January – Edward Goll, Bohemian-born pianist, 64
- 15 January – Robert Evett, singer, actor, theatre manager and producer, 74
- 21 February – Ernest Walker, composer, pianist, organist, teacher and writer on music, 78
- 3 April – Basil Harwood, organist and composer, 89
- 3 May – David John Tawe Jones, composer, 64
- 6 September – Walter Widdop, operatic tenor, 51
- 30 October – Stanley Kirkby, baritone singer and variety artist, 71
- date unknown – Frank Clifford Harris, lyricist, 74

== See also ==
- 1949 in British television
- 1949 in the United Kingdom
- List of British films of 1949
