= Last Meeting =

- Film poster
- Directed by: Gianni Franciolini
- Written by: Alberto Moravia; Edoardo Anton; Antonio Pietrangeli; Giorgio Pàstina
- Starring: Alida Valli; Amedeo Nazzari; Jean-Pierre Aumont
- Cinematography: Anchise Brizzi
- Edited by: Adriana Novelli
- Music by: Enzo Masetti
- Production company: Lux Film
- Distributed by: Lux Film
- Release date: 24 October 1951
- Running time: 89 minutes
- Language: Italian

Last Meeting (Italian: Ultimo incontro) is a 1951 Italian melodrama film directed by Gianni Franciolini and starring Alida Valli, Amedeo Nazzari and Jean-Pierre Aumont. It is loosely based on the novel La biondina by Marco Praga.

The film's sets were designed by the art director Flavio Mogherini.

== Cast ==
- Alida Valli as Lina Castelli
- Amedeo Nazzari as Piero Castelli
- Jean-Pierre Aumont as Michele Bonesi
- Leda Gloria as Bianca
- Vittorio Sanipoli as Augusto
- Giovanna Galletti as Flora
- Harry Weedon as Mr. Hermans
- Laura Carli as Miss Maria
- Michele Riccardini as Lodi Stationmaster
- Michele Malaspina as Vincenzi
- Nino Farina as himself
- Juan Manuel Fangio as himself
- Consalvo Sanesi as himself
- Felice Bonetto as himself
- Hans von Stuck as himself
- Luigi Fagioli as himself
