= Riccardo Pick-Mangiagalli =

Italian composer

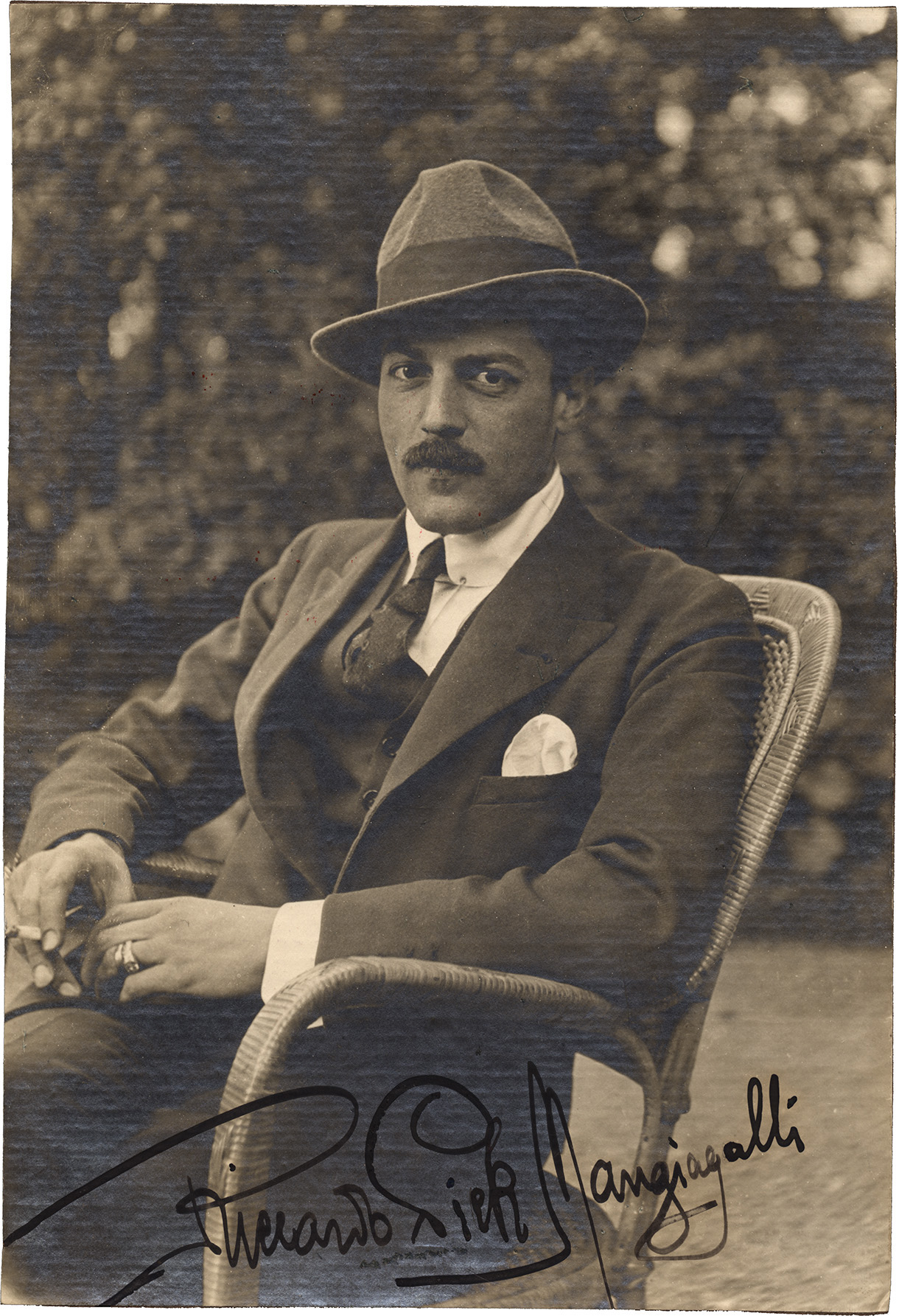

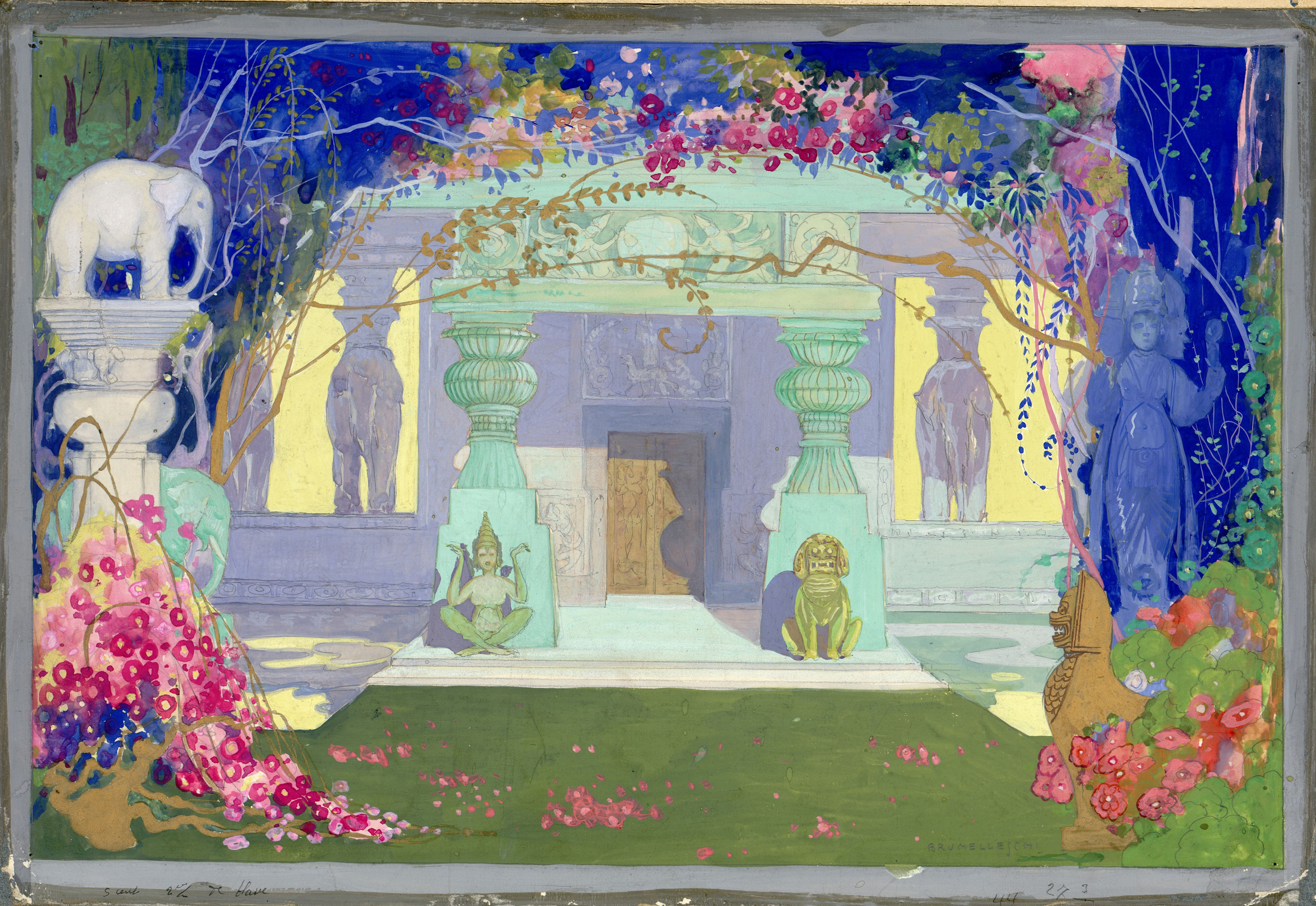
Set design by Umberto Brunelleschi for Pick-Mangiagalli's ballet Sumitra

Riccardo Pick-Mangiagalli (July 10, 1882 – July 8, 1949) was an Italian composer and pianist of Czech birth.

== Life and career ==
Born in Strakonice, South Bohemia, on July 10, 1882, Riccardo Pick-Mangiagalli moved with his family to Milan, Italy, when he was two years old. In 1896, at the age of 14, he began his studies at the Milan Conservatory. After graduating from the conservatory in 1903, he worked as a concert pianist for the next 11 years in Italy and Vienna.

In 1914, Pick-Mangiagalli abandoned his performance career in favor of pursuing work as a music teacher and composer. He taught at the faculty of the Milan Conservatory, and in 1936, he succeeded Ildebrando Pizzetti as its head. He remained the director of the Milan Conservatory until his death there on July 8, 1949, two days before his 67th birthday.

As a composer, Pick-Mangiagalli wrote several operas and ballets, as well as chamber music; he also composed music for films.
