= Giovanna Scotto =

Italian actress and voice actress

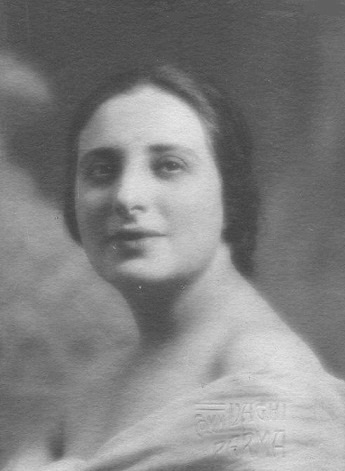
- Scotto in 1930
- Born: Giovanna Margherita Piana-Canova; 26 August 1895; Turin, Italy
- Died: 23 December 1985 (aged 90); Grottaferrata, Italy
- Occupations: Actress; voice actress
- Years active: 1912–1985
- Spouse(s): Vincenzo Scotto (deceased) Diego Calcagno (m. 1927; died 1979)

Giovanna Scotto (born Giovanna Margherita Piana-Canova; 26 August 1895 – 23 December 1985) was an Italian actress and voice actress.

== Biography ==
Scotto was born in Turin to a theatre company administrator and she made her on-stage debut as a teenager, starting off within the company of Ruggero Ruggeri and Emma Gramatica from 1909 until 1910, then within the company of Armando Falconi and later, Lamberto Picasso. On screen, Scotto made her first appearance in a 1912 silent film, then started to appear more prominently during the 1930s, making an appearance in the lost film Ragazzo. She acted in 25 more films after this and also performed in radio dramas until the 1960s.

Scotto was also a prominent voice actress, dubbing foreign films for release in the Italian market, alongside the likes of Lydia Simoneschi, Tina Lattanzi, Rosetta Calavetta and Andreina Pagnani. She was known for dubbing actresses such as Agnes Moorehead, Beulah Bondi, Mary Astor, Jane Darwell, Ingrid Bergman, Ethel Barrymore, Reta Shaw, Emma Baron, Gladys Cooper, Claudette Colbert, Martha Scott and many others. In her animated roles, she provided the Italian voice of the narrator in Cinderella and Princess in One Hundred and One Dalmatians.

=== Personal life ===
At a young age, Scotto married Vincenzo Scotto and took his name. After his death, she married the writer Diego Calcagno. Neither marriage produced any children.

Scotto died in Grottaferrata on 23 December 1985 at the age of 90.

== Selected filmography ==
- Ragazzo (1934)
- The Two Sergeants (1936)
- The Former Mattia Pascal (1937)
- The Brambilla Family Go on Holiday (1941)
- The Ten Commandments (1945)
- Two Anonymous Letters (1945)
- No Turning Back (1945)
- Desire (1946)
- Flying Squadron (1949)
- Red Seal (1950)
- Black Fire (1951)
- Operation Mitra (1951)
- Sunday Heroes (1952)

== Voice work ==
Year	Title	Role	Notes
1950	La Rosa di Bagdad	Fatima	Animated film

=== Dubbing ===
==== Films (Animation, Italian dub) ====
Year	Title	Role(s)	Ref
1950	Cinderella	Narrator	
1961	One Hundred and One Dalmatians	Princess	

== Bibliography ==
- Verdone, Luca. I film di Alessandro Blasetti. Gremese Editore, 1989.
