= Anne Firth =

British actress (1918–1961)

- Born: 1 August 1918; Westcliff-on-Sea, Essex, England
- Died: 16 January 1961 (aged 42); Farnworth, Lancashire, England
- Occupation: Actress
- Years active: 1938–1960 (film & TV)
- Spouse: John Michael Brigstocke (m. 1955)

Anne Heather Firth (1 August 1918 – 16 January 1961) was a British film actress. She appeared in several leading roles in films of the 1940s. She also worked on the West End stage, appearing in the 1937 play Bonnet Over the Windmill by Dodie Smith and in 1939 appearing in Goodness, How Sad by Robert Morley.

== Personal life ==
She was born to Ivan Eustace Firth (1891–1963) and Dorothy Gurney (1890–1965) in Westcliff-on-Sea, Essex, England.

In 1945 she was stricken with paralysis of the spine, interrupting her career for eighteen months. She was unable to walk, but slowly recovered in time to be cast in Scott of the Antarctic.

In 1953, she was injured in a van crash that left her badly disfigured.

She was later married to John Michael Brigstocke, a retired naval officer, but left him after only a few weeks of marriage.

She died of an intentional aspirin overdose after losing her job as a bartender due to injuries.

== Selected filmography ==
- Suspected Person (1942)
- The Goose Steps Out (1942)
- The First of the Few (1942)
- Bell-Bottom George (1944)
- Demobbed (1944)
- Scott of the Antarctic (1948)
- Vengeance Is Mine (1949)
- Three Moods (1951)
- The Adventures of Robin Hood (TV series) (1960)

== Bibliography ==
- Chapman, James. Past and Present: National Identity and the British Historical Film. I.B.Tauris, 2005.
