= The Mill on the Po =

1949 film

- Directed by: Alberto Lattuada
- Written by: Federico Fellini; Tullio Pinelli; Mario Bonfantini; Luigi Comencini; Alberto Lattuada; Carlo Musso; Sergio Romano
- Based on: The Mill on the Po by Riccardo Bacchelli
- Produced by: Carlo Ponti
- Starring: Carla Del Poggio; Jacques Sernas; Mario Besesti
- Cinematography: Aldo Tonti
- Edited by: Mario Bonotti
- Music by: Ildebrando Pizzetti
- Production company: Lux Film
- Distributed by: Lux Film
- Release date: 28 September 1949
- Running time: 97 minutes
- Country: Italy
- Language: Italian

The Mill on the Po (Italian: Il mulino del Po) is a 1949 Italian historical drama film directed by Alberto Lattuada and starring Carla Del Poggio, Jacques Sernas and Mario Besesti. It is based on the third part of the novel of the same name by Riccardo Bacchelli. It premiered at the 1949 Venice Film Festival. The films was produced and distributed by Lux Film, one of Italy's leading companies of the postwar years. Extensive location shooting took place around Lombardy including at Bagnolo San Vito, Porto Mantovano and Curtatone. The films sets were designed by the art director Luigi Gervasi.

== Synopsis ==
In nineteenth-century Lombardy the Scacerni family own their own floating mill on the River Po, using the watermill to grind crops harvested in the area. Berta Scacerni is engaged to Orbino Verginesi from a family of rural labourers. But following the Unification of Italy they are now under the control of Piedmontese authorities who rigorously enforce new taxes on the mills of the river. During a raid, to avoid being caught cheating the authorities, Berta's hot-headed brother Princivalle sets fire to mill causing damage. He serves a time in prison and, while the mill is repaired, Berta goes to work for Orbino's family on the land.

Her relationship with Orbino becomes complicated by the ongoing battle between the landowners, led by the domineering Clapassòn who wishes to modernise his holdings, and the socialist movement organising the labourers and tenant farmers to demand better terms. The labour leader Raibolini calls a strike and the country people cease work. As the Scacerni refuse to stop milling the wheat, they are ostracised by their neighbours and Berta receives the hostility of her fiancée's family. Raibolini pressures him to break off his engagement with her but he refuses and considers emigrating to America.

The Italian Army arrive to complete the harvest and a confrontation begins with the local woman. Many are arrested for assaulting the troops, before a deal is brokered to end the strike. However, in the heated atmosphere malicious gossip reaches Princivalle, recently released from prison, that Orbino has had sex with his sister Berta multiple times and tiring of his fiancée, now wishes to abandon her. During a confrontation between the two Princivalle knocks down Orbino, killing him.

== Cast ==
- Carla Del Poggio as Berta Scacerni
- Jacques Sernas as Orbino Verginesi
- Mario Besesti as Clapassòn, il padrone
- Giacomo Giuradei as Princivalle Scacerni
- Isabella Riva as Cecilia Scacerni
- Nino Pavese as Raibolini
- Giulio Calì as Smarazzacucco
- Anna Carena as L'Argìa
- Leda Gloria as La Sniza
- Dina Sassoli as Susanna
- Domenico Viglione Borghese as Luca
