= Walter von Hauff =

German actor (born 1949)

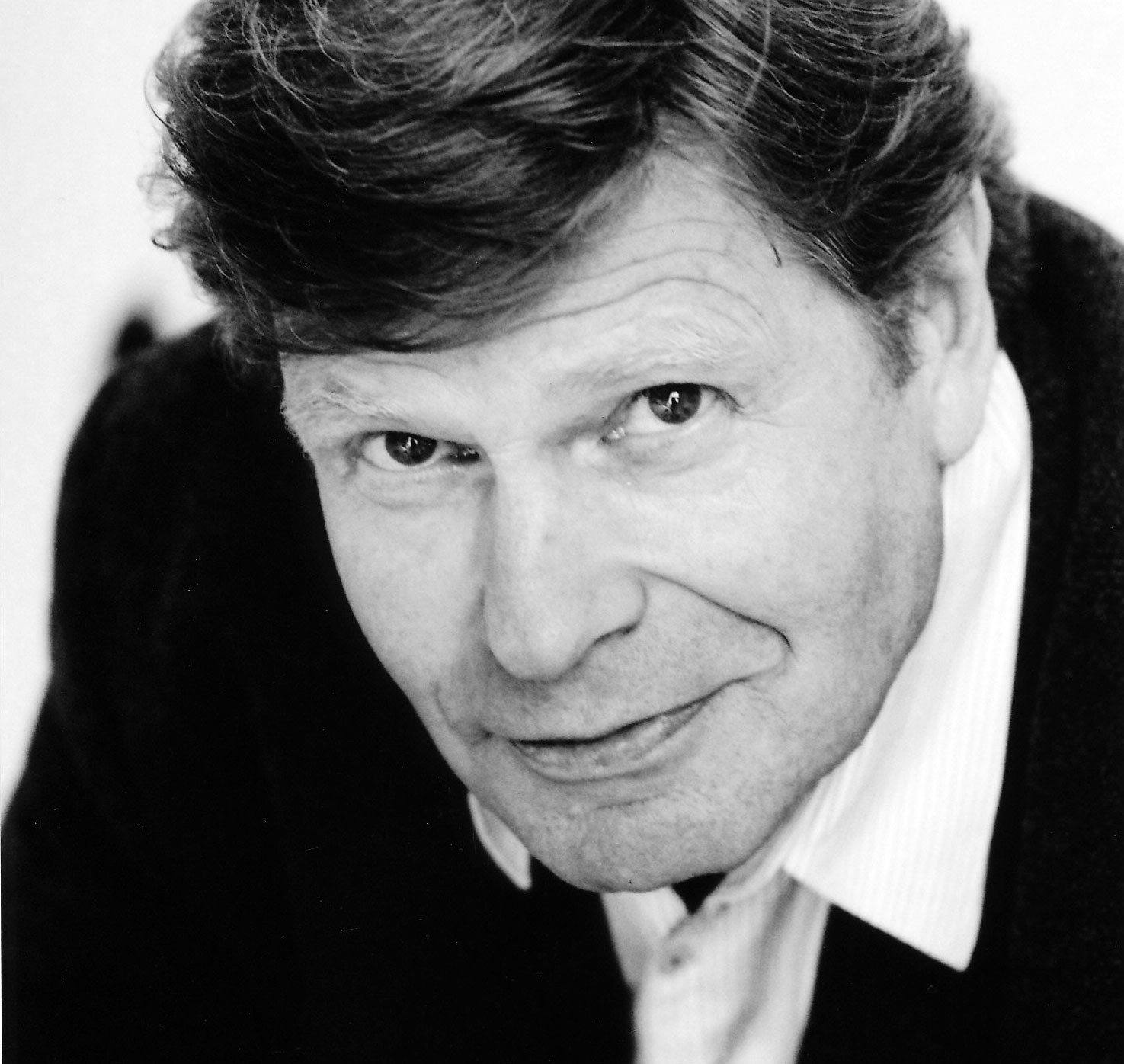
- Born: 10 May 1949 (age 76); Munich, Bavaria, Germany
- Occupation: Actor

Walter von Hauff (born 10 May 1949 in Munich) is a German actor who specializes in dubbing.

== Filmography ==
=== Television animation ===
- Buzz Lightyear of Star Command (Buzz Lightyear)
- Family Guy (Tom Tucker (second voice), Adam West (third voice))
- Hey Arnold! (Bob Pataki)
- One Piece (Captain Kuro, Iceburg)
- The Simpsons (Reverend Lovejoy (fifth voice))
- South Park (Mister Mackey (second voice))

=== Original video animation ===
- Stuart Little 3: Call of the Wild (Frederick Little)

=== Film animation ===
- Finding Nemo (Moonfish)
- Monsters, Inc. (Yeti)
- Pom Poko (Narrator)
- Toy Story (Buzz Lightyear)
- Toy Story 2 (Buzz Lightyear)
- Toy Story 3 (Buzz Lightyear)
- Toy Story 4 (Buzz Lightyear)

=== Live action ===
- Big Trouble (Officer Walter Kramitz)
- Bowling for Columbine (Michael Moore)
- Crouching Tiger, Hidden Dragon (Li Mu-bai)
- Fahrenheit 9/11 (Michael Moore)
- The Life Aquatic with Steve Zissou (Klaus Daimler)
- Monty Python's Flying Circus (Terry Jones)
- Sleepwalkers (Captain Ira Soames)
- Stuart Little (Frederick Little)
- Stuart Little 2 (Frederick Little)
