= Alfred Bashford =

English cricketer

Personal information
- Full name: Alfred Myddleton Bashford
- Born: 23 July 1881; Wickhampton, Norfolk
- Died: 31 July 1949 (aged 68); Hillingdon, Middlesex
- Batting: Right-handed

Domestic team information
- Years: Team
- 1906: Middlesex
- Source: Cricinfo, 16 March 2017

Alfred Myddleton Bashford (23 July 1881 – 31 July 1949) was an English clergyman. He played two first-class cricket matches for Middlesex County Cricket Club in 1906.

== Biography ==
Born at Wickhampton in Norfolk, Bashford was the son of Robert Bashford, the rector at St Andrew's church. The family moved to Middlesex when Robert became the vicar of St Thomas' church in Islington in 1888. He was educated at Merchant Taylors' School where he was in the cricket XI, before going up to Jesus College, Cambridge in 1900. He played in the Cambridge seniors' match in 1903 but did not play cricket for Cambridge University Cricket Club.

After graduating in 1903, Bashford was ordained as a deacon in the Church of England the following year, before becoming a priest in 1905. He served as a curate in Edmonton from 1904 to 1910 before becoming the London Diocese missioner at Sudbury until 1922. He moved to become the vicar of Holy Trinity church at Hounslow and, in 1934, became vicar of St John the Baptist, Hillingdon. He was the secretary of the London Diocesan Fund from 1926.

Both of Bashford's first-class cricket matches were played in June 1906. He made scores of 14 and 13 runs and took a wicket against Somerset at Lord's on debut, before recording a pair against Nottinghamshire the following week. He played club cricket for Southgate Cricket Club, played matches for London church sides, and played occasionally for Middlesex's Second XI between 1907 and 1910. As well as cricket, Bashford was considered a leading field hockey player, appearing for the Southgate club.

Bashford died "suddenly" in July 1949 whilst in post at Hillingdon. He was aged 67.
