= Giulio Panicali =

Italian voice actor (1899–1987)

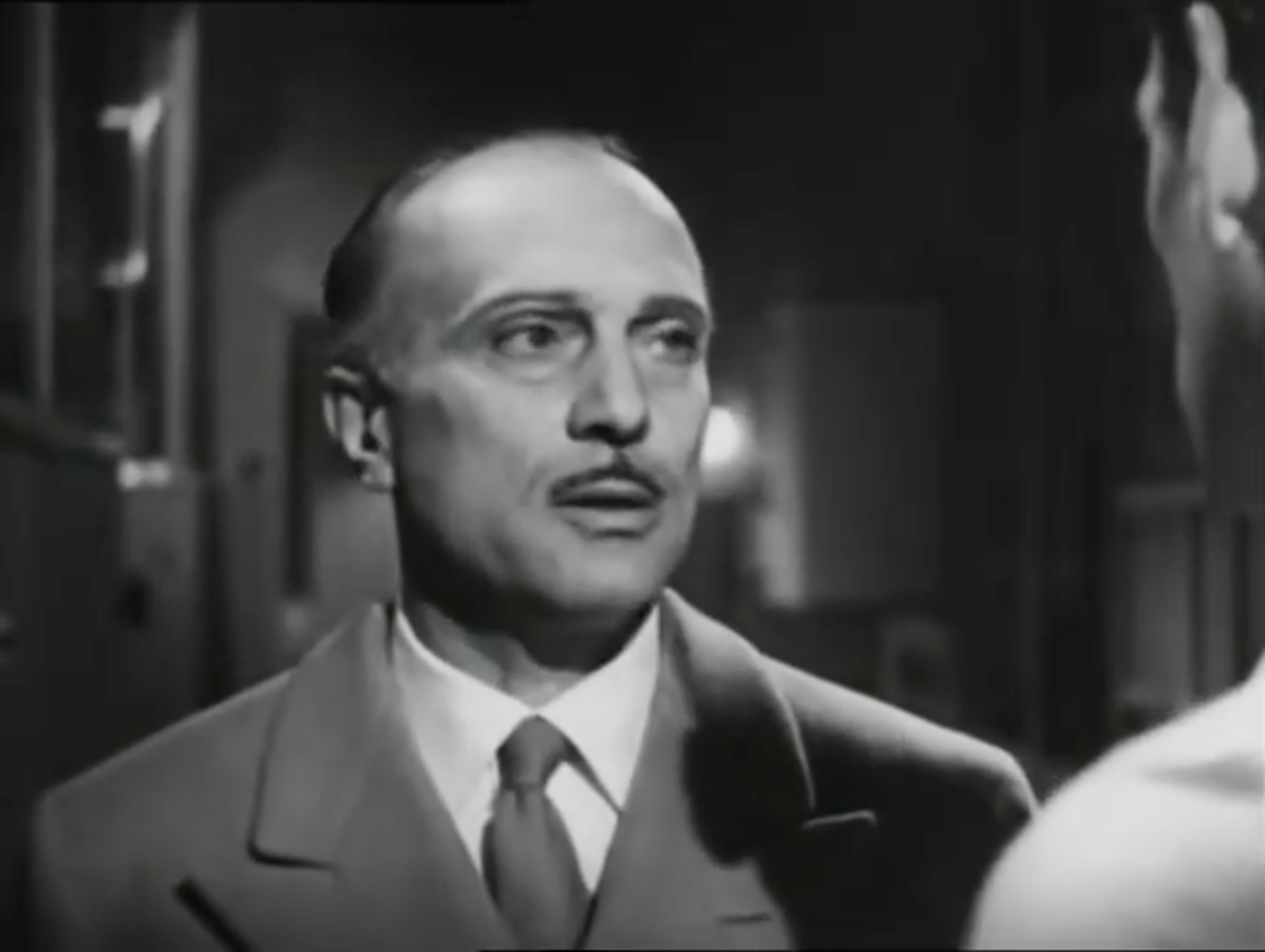
- Panicali in Desperate Farewell (1955)
- Born: 17 February 1899; Turin, Italy
- Died: 13 June 1987 (aged 88); Rome, Italy
- Occupations: Actor; voice actor; dubbing director
- Years active: 1934–1987

Giulio Panicali (17 February 1899 – 13 June 1987) was an Italian actor and voice actor.

== Biography ==
Panicali was born in Turin to Oscar Panicali, a Bersaglieri colonel, and Lidia Gazzeri. He started his acting career on screen in 1934, appearing in nine films in total within 21 years. He has even performed acting work for the EIAR public service broadcasting company.

Panicali was also a voice dubbing artist, dubbing foreign language films for release in Italy. He was considered to be among the greatest champions of dubbing during the Golden Ages and typically dubbed over the voices of actors such as Tyrone Power, Bing Crosby, Robert Taylor, Glenn Ford, Kirk Douglas, Ray Milland, Robert Mitchum, Ronald Reagan, Henry Fonda, Joel McCrea, Fred MacMurray, Montgomery Clift and many more. In Panicali's animated roles, he voiced the Prince in the Italian version of Snow White and the Seven Dwarfs.

As a dubbing director, Panicali oversaw the Italian dialogue for many foreign films, including several animated Disney films such as The Sword in the Stone, The Jungle Book and Lady and the Tramp.

== Filmography ==
=== Cinema ===
- Tenebre (1934)
- L'eredità in corsa (1939)
- Giù il sipario (1940)
- A Woman Has Fallen (1941)
- The Woman of Sin (1942)
- Sealed Lips (1942)
- The Two Orphans (1942)
- Bengasi (1942)
- The Rose of Bagdad (1949) – Voice
- Desperate Farewell (1955)

== Dubbing roles ==
=== Animation ===
- The Prince in Snow White and the Seven Dwarfs
- Fourth narrator in The Three Caballeros

=== Live action ===
- Barton Dewitt Clinton in Rose of Washington Square
- Jonathan Blake in Lloyd's of London
- Martin Maher in The Long Gray Line
- Tim Baker in A Yank in the R.A.F.
- Tom Owens in Rawhide
- Ken Norton in Day-Time Wife
- Stan Carlisle in Nightmare Alley
- Thomas Jefferson Tyler in That Wonderful Urge
- Walter of Gurnie in The Black Rose
- Juan Gallardo in Blood and Sand
- Jake Barnes in The Sun Also Rises
- Duncan MacDonald in Pony Soldier
- Jesse James in Jesse James
- Andrea Orsini in Prince of Foxes
- Jamie Waring in The Black Swan
- Stephen Fitzgerald in The Luck of the Irish
- Ward Stewart in Crash Dive
- Mark Fallon in The Mississippi Gambler
- Pedro de Vargas in Captain from Castile
- Jonathan Kent in Brigham Young
- Paul van Riebeck in Untamed
- Mike Kells in Diplomatic Courier
- Larry Darrell in The Razor's Edge
- Peter Standish in I'll Never Forget You
- Chuck Palmer in American Guerrilla in the Philippines
- Eddy Duchin in The Eddy Duchin Story
- Dion O'Leary in In Old Chicago
- Alan King in King of the Khyber Rifles
- Bing Crosby / Ray Milland in Star Spangled Rhythm
- Bing Crosby in Let's Make Love, Alias Jesse James
- Pete Garvey in Here Comes the Groom
- Dan Brooks in Riding High
- Harvey Howard in High Time
- George Cochran in Road to Bali
- Bill Benson in Anything Goes
- Johnny Adams in Blue Skies
- Jordan Blake in Just for You
- Jim Hardy in Holiday Inn
- Frank Elgin in The Country Girl
- Chuck Reardon in Road to Zanzibar
- Father Conroy in Say One for Me
- Paul Merrick in Mr. Music
- Josh Mallon V in Road to Singapore
- Jeff Peters in Road to Morocco
- Harry Turner in The Road to Hong Kong
- Bill Wainwright in Little Boy Lost
- Jim Pearson in Welcome Stranger
- Bob Wallace in White Christmas
- Duke Johnson / Junior Hooton in Road to Utopia
- Scat Sweeney in Road to Rio
- Joe Mulqueen in Top o' the Morning
- Mark Brandon in Valley of the Kings
- Charles Gilson in The Last Hunt
- Billy the Kid in Billy the Kid
- Steve Sinclair in Saddle the Wind
- Johnny Eager in Johnny Eager
- Christopher Kelvaney in Rogue Cop
- Paul Tibbets in Above and Beyond
- Roy Cronin in Waterloo Bridge
- Lance Poole in Devil's Doorway
- Brad Parker in D-Day the Sixth of June
- Ward Kinsman in Ambush
- Bushrod Gentry in Many Rivers to Cross
- Joel Shore in All the Brothers Were Valiant
- Cliff Barton in The Power and the Prize
- Buck Wyatt in Westward the Women
- Rigby in The Bribe
- Lloyd Treadman in Tip on a Dead Jockey
- Lancelot in Knights of the Round Table
- Rio in Ride, Vaquero!
- Quentin Durward in The Adventures of Quentin Durward
- Michael Curragh in Conspirator
- Wilfred of Ivanhoe in Ivanhoe
- Armand Duval in Camille
- Sam Dent in The Americano
- Richard Dadier in Blackboard Jungle
- Ben Wade in 3:10 to Yuma
- Tom Reece in Cowboy
- George Temple / George Kelby Jr. in The Fastest Gun Alive
- Thomas King in Interrupted Melody
- Dave Stannard in Ransom!
- Mike Blake in The Green Glove
- Maxwell Webster in Young Man with Ideas
- Max Siegel in Don't Go Near the Water
- David Blake in Trial
- Colonel Dax in Paths of Glory
- Spartacus in Spartacus
- Ned Land in 20,000 Leagues Under the Sea
- Einar in The Vikings
- Tucker Wedge in The Walls of Jericho
- Jack Burns in Lonely Are the Brave
- Brendan O'Malley in The Last Sunset
- Peter Niles in Mourning Becomes Electra
- George Phipps in A Letter to Three Wives
- George Brougham in The List of Adrian Messenger
- Johnny Hawks in The Indian Fighter
- Don Birnam in The Lost Weekend
- John Geste in Beau Geste
- George Stroud in The Big Clock
- Mark Bellis in So Evil My Love
- Alan Miller in Something to Live For
- Steven Tolliver in Reap the Wild Wind
- Stephen Neale in Ministry of Fear
- Robert Lawson in Sealed Verdict
- Wes Steele in A Man Alone
- Roderick Fitzgerald in The Uninvited
- Philip Kirby in The Major and the Minor
- Patrick Fairlie in Jamaica Run
- Jeff Bailey in Out of the Past
- Dan Milner in His Kind of Woman
- Nick Cochran in Macao
- Jeff McCloud in The Lusty Men
- Lucas Marsh in Not as a Stranger
- Harry Powell in The Night of the Hunter
- Felix Bowers in Fire Down Below
- Charles Delacro in The Grass Is Greener
- Lonni Douglas in White Witch Doctor
- Mark Lucas in My Forbidden Past
- Robert Sellers in She Couldn't Say No
- Wilson in Bandido
- Thomas McQuigg in The Racket
- Lucas Doolin in Thunder Road
- Dave Bishop in Foreign Intrigue
- Hal Norton in Louisa
- Vance Britton in The Last Outpost
- Peter Boyd in Bedtime for Bonzo
- Jeff Williams in Hong Kong
- Frame Johnson in Law and Order
- Dan McCloud in Tropic Zone
- Juror No. 8 in 12 Angry Men
- Theodore Roosevelt Jr. in The Longest Day
- Frank Beardsley in Yours, Mine and Ours
- Tommy Turner in The Male Animal
- Peter Ames in The Mad Miss Manton
- Eddie Taylor in You Only Live Once
- Robert A. Leffingwell in Advise & Consent
- Richard Glasgow in Come and Get It
- John L. Sullivan in Sullivan's Travels
- Ramsay McKay in Wells Fargo
- The Virginian in The Virginian
- Zack Hallock in The Lone Hand
- Clete Mattson in Border River
- Chuck Conner in Saddle Tramp
- Walter Neff in Double Indemnity
- Bill Morgan in Where Do We Go from Here?
- Edward Rickenbacker in Captain Eddie
- Bob MacDonald in The Egg and I
- Matt Gordon in Singapore
- Al in On Our Merry Way
- Bill Dunnigan in The Miracle of the Bells
- Grant Jordan in Family Honeymoon
- Peter Ulysses Lockwood in A Millionaire for Christy
- Meriwether Lewis in The Far Horizons
- Clifford Groves in There's Always Tomorrow
- Morris Townsend in The Heiress
- George Eastman in A Place in the Sun
- Michael William Logan in I Confess
- Robert E. Lee Prewitt in From Here to Eternity
- Giovanni Doria in Terminal Station
- Danny MacCullough in The Big Lift
