= Vengeance Is Mine (1949 film) =

1949 film by Alan Cullimore

- Directed by: Alan Cullimore
- Written by: Alan Cullimore
- Produced by: Ben Arbeid
- Starring: Valentine Dyall; Anne Firth; Richard Goolden
- Cinematography: James Wilson
- Edited by: Gerald Landau
- Music by: Ken Thorne
- Production company: Cullimore-Arbeid Productions
- Distributed by: Eros Films
- Release date: July 1949
- Running time: 59 minutes
- Country: United Kingdom
- Language: English

Vengeance Is Mine is a 1949 British second feature crime drama film directed by Alan Cullimore and starring Valentine Dyall, Anne Firth and Richard Goolden.

== Plot ==
Charles Heywood is a wrongly imprisoned businessman who is told by his doctors that he is dying. He constructs an elaborate plan to hire a hitman to kill him and then frame his former partner, who put him behind bars.

== Cast ==
- Valentine Dyall as Charles Heywood
- Anne Firth as Linda Farrell
- Richard Goolden as Sammy Parsons
- Sam Kydd as Stacy
- Ethel Coleridge as Mrs Briggs
- Patsy Drake as Patsy
- Alexander Wright as the doctor
- Russell Westwood as Cass
- Manville Tarrant as man
- Alex Graham as barman
- John Hart as barman
- Arthur Brander as Richard Kemp
- Roland Caswell as Police Sargeant
- Michael Bird as policeman
- Bob Connor as garage man
- Betty Taylor as the little girl

== Critical reception ==
Monthly Film Bulletin said "This absurd story is not helped by the lugubrious playing of Valentine Dyall as Charles; overstressing of the comic relief and third-rate acting destroy any remaining likelihood of reality."

In British Sound Films: The Studio Years 1928–1959 David Quinlan rated the film as "poor", writing: "Absurd thriller: even the cast don't seem enthusiastic."
