= Maureen Riscoe =

British actor (1921–2003)

- Riscoe in A Matter of Murder (1949)
- Born: 25 July 1921; London, England
- Died: 26 November 2003 (aged 82); Uxbridge, London, England
- Occupations: Actress and casting director
- Parent(s): Arthur Riscoe; Olive Raymond

Maureen Riscoe (25 July 1921 – 26 November 2003) was an English actress and casting director.

She was born in London on 25 July 1921, the only daughter of fellow actor Arthur Riscoe and his wife Olive Raymond.

Riscoe died on 26 November 2003 in Uxbridge, London.

== Selected radio ==
- Much-Binding-in-the-Marsh (1944–1954)

== Filmography ==
- Old Mother Riley's New Venture (1949) as Mabel
- A Matter of Murder (1949) as Julie McKelvin
