= Mario Besesti =

Italian actor (1894–1968)

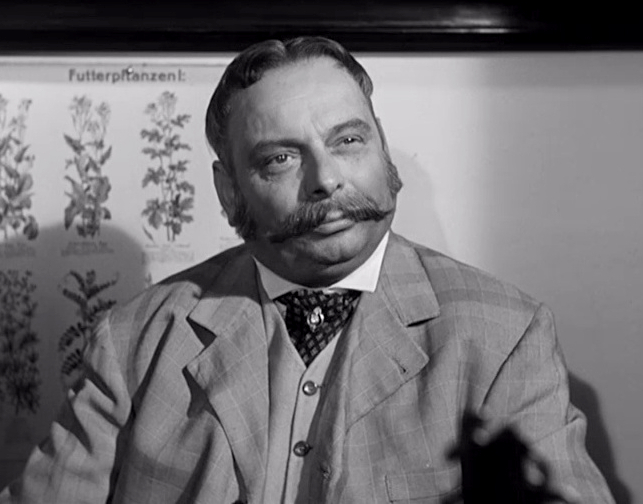
- Besesti in The Mill on the Po (1949)
- Born: 20 November 1894; Milan, Italy
- Died: 21 June 1968 (aged 73); Rome, Italy
- Occupations: Actor; voice actor
- Years active: 1932–1968

Mario Besesti (20 November 1894 – 21 June 1968) was an Italian actor and voice actor.

== Biography ==
Besesti began a career acting on stage and screen in 1932. He made his film debut in 1938 and among his most popular filmography includes the 1949 film The Mill on the Po. Besesti was also well known as a voice dubber. Because of his strong voice and large build, he usually dubbed actors with the same stature such as Charles Laughton, Edward Arnold, Thomas Mitchell, Raymond Massey, Sydney Greenstreet, Charles Coburn and many more.

Besesti was considered to be one of Italy's most significant, well-known dubbers during the Golden Ages. He worked for the Cooperativa Doppiatori Cinematografici and made collaborations with other dubbers which included Gualtiero De Angelis, Lauro Gazzolo, Carlo Romano, Wanda Tettoni and Nino Pavese.

Besesti was also active in the Italian dubs of some of the early Disney animated films. He dubbed Stromboli in Pinocchio, The Huntsman in Snow White and the Seven Dwarfs and Trusty in Lady and the Tramp.

== Death ==
Besesti died in Rome on 21 June 1968 at the age of 73. He was buried at Campo Verano.

== Filmography ==
=== Cinema ===
Year	Title	Role	Notes
1938	Pride		
1940	Then We'll Get a Divorce	Il capo del personale	
1943	Short Circuit	Gruner	
1946	O sole mio		
1947	Eugenia Grandet	Il vinaio	
1949	The Mill on the Po	Clapassòn	
1950	My Beautiful Daughter	Sindaco Favarelli	
1950	The Thief of Venice	Nicolò	

== Voice work ==
Year	Title	Role	Notes
1950	La Rosa di Bagdad	Zizibé	Animated film

=== Dubbing ===
==== Films (Animation, Italian dub) ====
Year	Title	Role(s)	Ref
1938	Snow White and the Seven Dwarfs	The Huntsman	
1939	Gulliver's Travels	King Bombo	
1947	Pinocchio	Stromboli	
1948	Dumbo	Narrator	
1948	Bambi	The Great Prince of the Forest	
1950	Cinderella	The King	
1951	Alice in Wonderland	Walrus	
1955	Lady and the Tramp	Trusty	

==== Films (Live action, Italian dub) ====
- Phineas V. Lambert in If I Had a Million
- Quasimodo in The Hunchback of Notre Dame
- Sir Humphrey Pengallan in Jamaica Inn
- William Kidd in Captain Kidd
- Albert Lory in This Land Is Mine
- Uncle William "Billy" Bailey in It's a Wonderful Life
- Michael Howland in Within These Walls
- Tom Blue in The Black Swan
- Thad Vail in High Barbaree
- Reginald "Rags" Barnaby in Destry
- Jim Taylor in Mr. Smith Goes to Washington
- Amory Stilham in Mrs. Parkington
- Judge Wilkins in Dear Wife
- Penrod Biddel in City That Never Sleeps
- Jimmy Norton in Meet John Doe
- Wolf Larsen in The Sea Wolf
- James R. Judson in From Here to Eternity
- Pablo in For Whom the Bell Tolls
- Pancho Villa in Viva Villa!
- Max Fabian in All About Eve
