= La Rosa di Bagdad =

La rosa di Bagdad (The Rose of Baghdad)
- Directed by: Anton Gino Domenighini
- Written by: Lucio De Caro; Nina Maguire; Tony Maguire
- Produced by: Anton Gino Domenighini
- Starring: English; Patricia Hayes; Stephen Jack; Arthur Young; Don Barclay; Humphrey Kent; Paul Hansard; Julie Andrews; Italian; Germana Calderini; Beatrice Preziosa; Giulio Panicali; Carlo Romano; Olinto Cristina; Mario Besesti; Giovanna Scotto; Renata Marini; Lauro Gazzolo; Maria Saccenti; Sakella Rio; Luisa Malagrida; F. Delle Fornaci; Giulio Fioravanti; Piero Passarotti
- Narrated by: Stefano Sibaldi (Italian); Howard Marion-Crawford (English)
- Cinematography: Cesare Pelizzari
- Music by: Riccardo Pick-Mangiagalli
- Distributed by: United Artists (America)
- Release dates: December 22, 1949 (Venice); 1952 (UK, U.S.)
- Running time: 76 minutes
- Country: Italy
- Language: Italian

La Rosa di Bagdad ('The Rose of Baghdad') is a 1949 Italian animated film by Anton Gino Domeneghini. In 1952, the film was dubbed into English, retitled The Singing Princess and dubbed by Julie Andrews as her first venture into voice-over work. The film was reissued in 1967, at the height of Andrews' subsequent Hollywood career. It is often cited as one of the first animated films from Europe and in Technicolor together with The Dynamite Brothers. It is also Italy's first film in Technicolor.

== Plot ==
A long time ago, the people of Baghdad lived happily under the rule of Caliph Oman III, greatest and kindest of any Caliph. Even at the time of his niece Princess Zeila's upcoming thirteenth birthday, the people were happier still. However, the tyrant Sheikh Jafar, and his shadow of a magician, Burk, have other plans, in order to take over Oman's kingdom. After a lovely performance by Princess Zeila and her snake charmer friend Amin, a messenger attempts to give a proclamation, written by Oman's information minister, Tonko, to the princes from the three cities across the river. However, before the messenger could get any further, Burk turns him into stone.

Later, after Amin charms a few snakes, his Magpie, Calina, attempts to steal one of Amin's bells after breaking her promise while working on a tambourine. He not only attended Princess Zeila's next performance at the palace; he applied the music for it. After the performance, Jafar, who also attended, attempts to propose to Zeila, but Caliph Oman's ministers, Tonko, Zirko, and Zizibe, think otherwise, even Amin, who later overhears that Burk has put an infatuation spell on Jafar's ring, making anyone who wears it fall in love with him.

Later that night, Amin and Calina try to keep hidden from sight at Jafar's palace, stealing the magic ring. Jafar had informed Burk of the magpie's thievery, and Burk announces his plan to his master. Back at Oman's palace, Amin tells the ministers that he will bring the ring to them, and that they would give the ring to the ugliest woman they could find.

The following morning, Zeila was at the palace singing. Amin tries to warn Zeila about Jafar's plan, that is, until Burk kidnaps him. A trial is held in favor of Amin's absence, and his mother is heartbroken. Calina, restless that Amin has not returned, sets out to find him. After Burk takes the ring away from Amin, Calina arrives and attempts to take the ring back. However, Burk throws Calina at a wall and fatally wounds her.

The ministers attempt to find Amin's trail, but take a break at a crystal stream and drink the water there. However, Burk places a spell on the water, turning the old ministers into babies. The woman who gathers water there cradles them, singing a lullaby to them.

Vowing not to let Calina die in vain, Amin tears off part of a sleeping Burk's cloak, trying his best not to wake him up, and flies out of the palace. The magician wakes up and is informed about his cloak, and takes off after Amin. The two engage in an air duel, and after Burk takes the torn part of his cloak back, Amin falls into a stream. Burk attempts to find Amin, but with no luck. Amin comes out of the river, only to find that Zeila had become infatuated with Jafar and is wearing the magic ring. Heartbroken, he calls to his old beggar friend Fatima, who gives him Aladdin's lamp as a parting gift. Amin rubs the lamp, and a genie comes out. Amin wishes to see his mother, but first, the genie takes them both to Jafar's palace to face Burk one last time. With Burk defeated, the messenger has returned to life, the magic ring disintegrated, and the ministers are old men again. The genie has also resurrected Calina, making Amin happy.

Back at Oman's palace, Zeila admits that she loves Amin to Jafar, who is about to have his guard take Zeila as prisoner. Amin arrives in time to save Zeila, and, with a little help from the genie, he uses his snake charmer's flute to lure Jafar and his guard to dance into the river.

With Zeila and Amin together again, peace is restored in Baghdad. The city rejoiced upon celebrating the marriage of Princess Zeila and Amin. As the narrator of the story puts it, love triumphed over hate, right over wrong, and good over evil.

== Cast ==
Character	Original	English
Narrator	Stefano Sibaldi	Howard Marion-Crawford
Princess Zeila	Germana Calderini	Julie Andrews
Princess Zeila	Beatrice Preziosa (singing)	Julie Andrews
Sheikh Jafar	Giulio Panicali	Stephen Jack
Calif Oman	Olinto Cristina	Arthur Young
Zizibé (Minister of Health)/Zirko	Mario Besesti	Paul Hansard
Fatima	Giovanna Scotto	Reta Shaw
Amins Mother	Renata Marini	Unknown
The Grand Kadi	Lauro Gazzolo	Unknown
Black Woman at the Fountain	Maria Saccenti	Unknown
Burk - the Magician	Carlo Romano (singing)	Unknown
Black Woman at the Fountain	Sakella Rio (singing)	Unknown
Calina (Amin's Magpie)	Luisa Malagrida (singing)	Unknown
Choir of the three Ministers	F. Delle Fornaci (singing)	Unknown
Choir of the three Ministers	Giulio Fioravanti (singing)	Unknown
Choir of the three Ministers	Piero Passarotti (singing)	Unknown
Amin	Unknown	Patricia Hayes
Tonko	Mario Gallina	Humphrey Kent

=== Additional English Voices ===
- Don Barclay

== Release ==
In 1952, the film was dubbed into English, retitled The Singing Princess. The voice cast starred Julie Andrews in her first film role, as well as her first voice-over work. It was her only voice-over work in the 1950s and her only film until Mary Poppins twelve years later. The film was reissued in 1967 at the height of Andrews' subsequent Hollywood career. The film came out on VHS in the mid-1980s and on DVD in 2005.

Released in the U.S. at the same time as the animated Italian feature I Fratelli Dinamite, and inspired by The Arabian Nights, the story concerns a beautiful princess, a poor-but-honest hero, an evil sultan, and a slave of the lamp. Reviewers in 1949 were taken by director Anton Gino Domeghini's clever choice of camera angles and by Riccardo Pick-Mangiagalli's musical score.
