= Kensington Studios =

The Kensington Studios (also known as the Viking Studios) were film production studios located in Kensington, London that operated between 1947 and 1950.

The film I'm a Stranger (1952) was made there.

During the 1950s, it was employed for commercial films, but television eventually took over as the studio's mainstay.

== Bibliography ==
- Warren, Patricia. British Film Studios: An Illustrated History. Batsford, 2001.
