= David Stafford (writer) =

English writer, broadcaster and occasional musician

David Stafford (11 April 1949 – 22 October 2023) was an English writer, broadcaster and occasional musician.

== Biography ==
Stafford was born in Birmingham where he attended King Edward VI Aston School. He began his career in fringe and community theatre in the 1970s. In the early 1980s, he collaborated and toured with Alexei Sayle, which resulted in two series for Capital Radio, two plays for TV, a book, Great Bus Journeys of the World, and various songs and recordings including Doctor Marten's Boots. At the same time he was a presenter on the Channel 4 consumer programme 4 What It’s Worth, contributed to many arts programmes and documentaries including The Media Show (Channel 4) and extensively to The Late Show (BBC2). His TV plays included Dread Poets Society (BBC2) co-written with the poet Benjamin Zephaniah. For ten years he also wrote a weekly column for the Saturday Guardian, eventually called "Staffordshire Bull".

During the 1990s, Stafford presented Tracks for BBC2, Going Places for BBC Radio 4 and was a regular panellist on Radio 4's literary parody game, Booked. He took over from Pete McCarthy as host of the Radio 4 panel game X Marks the Spot, and frequently stood in for John Peel as the presenter of Home Truths. After Peel's death, he became first one of the pool of presenters and later sole presenter of the programme.

Stafford collaborated with his wife Caroline, writing comedies and dramas, mostly for radio, including Man of Soup, The Brothers, Hazelbeach, The True and Inspirational Life Of St Nicholas (winner of the Prix Marulic),The Day The Planes Came, The Year They Invented Sex, Hancock's Ashes and a series of legal dramas based on the true-life cases of Norman Birkett.

The couple wrote six biographies, all published by Omnibus Press: Fings Ain't Wot They Used T'Be - The Life of Lionel Bart, (2011), which was chosen as BBC Radio 4's Book of The Week and shortlisted for the Sheridan Morley Award; Cupid Stunts - The Life and Radio Times of Kenny Everett (2014); Big Time - The Life of Adam Faith (2015); Maybe I'm Doing it Wrong - The Life and Music of Randy Newman (2016); Halfway to Paradise - The Life of Billy Fury (2018) and Anymore for Anymore - The Ronnie Lane Story (2023).

In 2020, Stafford's first novel, Skelton's Guide To Domestic Poisons, was published by Allison and Busby. The sequel, Skelton's Guide to Suitcase Murders followed in April 2021.

Stafford lived in North London and died on 22 October 2023, at the age of 74. He was survived by his wife and writing partner, Caroline, and their three adult children.
