= 1949 in the United Kingdom =

Events from the year 1949 in the United Kingdom.

== Incumbents ==
- Monarch – George VI
- Prime Minister – Clement Attlee (Labour)

== Events ==
- January – Mass Observation carries out a national survey into the sexual behaviour and attitudes of 4,000 British people, "Little Kinsey". The results remain largely unpublished for over fifty years.
- 1 January
  - Peacetime conscription in the United Kingdom is regularised under the National Service Act 1947. Men aged 18–26 years in England, Scotland and Wales are obliged to serve full-time in the armed forces for 18 months.
  - The British Nationality Act 1948 comes into effect, creating the status of "Citizen of the United Kingdom and Colonies", superseding the shared status of "Commonwealth citizen".
- 4 January – RMS Caronia of the Cunard Line departs Southampton for New York on her maiden voyage.
- 28 January – Lynskey tribunal on corruption in public life reports, leading to the resignation of John Belcher as an MP.
- 31 January – Book at Bedtime makes its debut on the BBC Light Programme.
- 1 February – Women's Auxiliary Air Force renamed as the Women's Royal Air Force.
- 15 March – Post-war rationing of clothes ends.
- 25 March – Laurence Olivier's film Hamlet (1948) becomes the first British film to win a 'Best Picture' Oscar.
- 28 March – Astronomer Fred Hoyle coins the term Big Bang during a BBC Third Programme radio broadcast (although describing the model as "unsatisfactory").
- 1 April – The Marquess of Bath opens Longleat House to paying visitors, the first privately owned stately home to be opened.
- 4 April – Britain signs the North Atlantic Treaty, creating NATO.
- 12 April – The first women appointed King's Counsel in England: Rose Heilbron and Helena Normanton.
- 20 April
  - Royal Navy frigate HMS Amethyst goes up the Yangtze River to evacuate British Commonwealth refugees escaping the advance of the Mao's Communist forces. Under heavy fire, it runs aground off Rose Island. After an aborted rescue attempt on 26 April, it anchors 10 miles upstream. Negotiations with the Communist forces to let the ship leave drag on for weeks, during which time its cat, Simon, raises the crew's morale.
  - The first Badminton Horse Trials are held at Badminton House in Gloucestershire.
- 24 April – Wartime rationing of confectionery ends, but is reinstituted shortly thereafter as shortages return.
- 26 April – Ealing comedy film Passport to Pimlico makes its premiere in London.
- 28 April – The 1949 Commonwealth Prime Ministers' Conference issues the London Declaration, enabling India (and, thereafter, any other nation) to remain in the Commonwealth despite becoming a republic, creating the position of 'Head of the Commonwealth' (held by the ruling British monarch), and renaming the organisation from 'British Commonwealth' to 'Commonwealth of Nations'.
- 29 April – The News Review reveals that neither the English public school Selhurst College nor its headmaster H. Rochester Sneath exist, but are a hoax created by Humphry Berkeley the previous year.
- 30 April – 1949 FA Cup Final: Wolverhampton Wanderers F.C. win the FA Cup for the first time in 41 years, and the third time in their history, with a 3–1 win over Leicester City at Wembley Stadium.
- April – Manchester Mark 1 computer operable at the University of Manchester.
- May – Council for Wales and Monmouthshire, set up as a government advisory body, first meets.
- 1 May – The gas industry is nationalised.
- 3 May – Parliament passes the Ireland Act guaranteeing the position of Northern Ireland as part of the United Kingdom as long as a majority of its citizens want it to be. The UK Government also formally recognises the existence of the Republic of Ireland.
- 6 May – EDSAC, the first practicable stored-programme computer, runs its first programme at Cambridge University.
- 7 May – The 1949 England Scotland Wales Netball Series sees England, Scotland and Wales all play their debut netball test matches.
- 10 May – First self-service launderette opens, in Queensway (London).
- 11 May – Christopher Fry's verse drama The Lady's Not for Burning premieres in London.
- 7–25 June – Dock strike forces the government to use troops to unload goods.
- 8 June – George Orwell's dystopian novel Nineteen Eighty-Four is published in London by Secker & Warburg.
- 16 June – Ealing comedy film Whisky Galore! released.
- 21 June – Ealing comedy film Kind Hearts and Coronets released.
- 14 July – Church Dignitaries (Retirement) Measure of the Church of England provides for the retirement of certain diocesan office-holders on the grounds of incapacity, unbecoming conduct or neglect of duty.
- 27 July – Maiden flight of the British-built de Havilland Comet, the world's first passenger jet, at Hatfield, Hertfordshire.
- 30 July – Legal Aid and Advice Act establishes a much-extended system of legal aid in England and Wales (with the Legal Aid and Solicitors (Scotland) Act applying similarly in Scotland).
- 31 July – Captain Kerans of HMS Amethyst decides to make a break after nightfall under heavy fire from the Chinese People's Liberation Army both sides of the Yangtze River and successfully rejoins the fleet at Woosung the next day.
- 22 August – T. S. Eliot's verse comedy The Cocktail Party premieres at the Edinburgh Festival.
- 24 August – Old Trafford football stadium, home of Manchester United F.C., is reopened following a comprehensive rebuild due to bomb damage by the Luftwaffe eight years earlier.
- 2 September – Film The Third Man, with screenplay by Graham Greene, released. It wins the 1949 Grand Prix at the Cannes Film Festival.
- 19 September – The pound is devalued by 30% against the United States dollar.
- 21 September – The first comprehensive school in Wales is opened in Holyhead, Anglesey.
- 30 September – The Berlin Airlift comes to an end, during which 17 American and 7 British planes have crashed delivering supplies to Soviet blockaded Berlin.
- October – Valerie Hunter Gordon is granted a UK patent for the disposable nappy.
- 12 October – John Boyd Orr, 1st Baron Boyd-Orr wins the Nobel Peace Prize.
- 26 October – How Do You View?, the first comedy series on British television, starring Terry-Thomas, is first broadcast on the BBC.
- 4 November – Cwmbran designated as the first New Town in Wales under powers of the New Towns Act 1946.
- 24 November – Representation of the People Act 1949 provides for reviews of parliamentary boundaries by the permanent Boundary Commissions; abolishes the terms 'parliamentary borough' and 'parliamentary county', renaming them 'borough constituency' and 'county constituency'; abolishes the university constituencies; and removes remaining provisions allowing plural voting in parliamentary elections by owners of business premises.
- 28 November – Former UK Prime Minister Winston Churchill makes a landmark speech in support of the idea of a European Union at Kingsway Hall, London, but without commitment to early UK membership.
- 16 December – Parliament Act given royal assent, cuts the House of Lords veto to one year.
- 17 December – Sutton Coldfield transmitting station begins transmitting BBC Television to the English Midlands, the first broadcasts to be seen outside the London area.

=== Undated ===
- The number of workforce deaths in the coal industry is reported to have fallen to a record low since nationalisation two years ago.
- With an average Central England temperature of 10.64 °C or 51.15 °F, the record for the hottest year in that series set in 1834 and equalled in 1921 is broken. The record set this year stands until 1990 by when anthropogenic global warming has come largely to control temperatures.

== Publications ==
- Enid Blyton's children's books Little Noddy Goes to Toyland, the first to introduce the title character; and The Secret Seven, first in the eponymous series.
- Agatha Christie's novel Crooked House.
- H. F. Ellis' humorous collection The Papers of A. J. Wentworth B.A.
- Graham Greene's novella The Third Man.
- Nancy Mitford's novel Love in a Cold Climate.
- George Orwell's novel Nineteen Eighty-Four.

== Births ==
- 7 January – Brian Haw, protester and peace campaigner (died 2011)
- 16 January – Caroline Munro, actress and model
- 17 January – Mick Taylor, rock guitarist
- 19 January
  - Robert Palmer, singer (died 2003)
  - Andrew Samuels, psychologist and academic
  - Dennis Taylor, snooker player
- 23 January – Joan Walley, politician
- 25 January
  - John Cooper Clarke, performance poet
  - Paul Nurse, biologist, Nobel Prize winner
- 29 January – Andy Carter, middle-distance runner
- 2 February – Duncan Bannatyne, entrepreneur
- 4 February – Richard Ryder, Baron Ryder of Wensum, broadcaster and politician, Paymaster General
- 16 February – Lyn Paul, pop singer
- 18 February – Charlie Waite, landscape photographer
- 2 March – J. P. R. Williams, Welsh rugby international (died 2024)
- 6 March – Martin Buchan, footballer
- 9 March – Neil Hamilton, politician.
- 12 March – David Mellor, politician and broadcaster
- 13 March – Trevor Sorbie, celebrity hairdresser (died 2024)
- 17 March
  - Alex Higgins, snooker player (died 2010)
  - Stuart Rose, businessman and life peer
- 24 March – Nick Lowe, pop singer
- 26 March – Jon English, English-born Australian singer-songwriter and actor (died 2016 in Australia)
- 28 March – Kevin Lloyd, actor (died 1998)
- 1 April – Sammy Nelson, footballer
- 3 April – Richard Thompson, rock guitarist and songwriter
- 8 April – Alex Fergusson, Presiding Officer of the Scottish Parliament 2007–2011 (died 2018)
- 14 April – John Wallace, trumpeter (died 2026)
- 23 April – John Miles, rock music vocalist, guitarist and keyboardist (died 2021)
- 24 April
  - Betty Jackson, fashion designer
  - James Paice, farmer and politician
- 25 April – James Fenton, poet
- 29 April – Anita Dobson, actress
- 2 May – Alan Titchmarsh, gardener and television presenter
- 3 May – Phil Scraton, criminologist
- 4 May – Lindsey Hughes, historian (died 2007)
- 13 May
  - Jane Glover, conductor and musicologist
  - Zoë Wanamaker, actress (born in New York)
- 18 May – Rick Wakeman, rock keyboard player and songwriter (Yes)
- 21 May
  - Andrew Neil, Scottish journalist and broadcaster
  - Rosalind Plowright, opera singer
- 24 May
  - Jim Broadbent, character actor
  - Roger Deakins, cinematographer
- 26 May – Jeremy Corbyn, Leader of the Labour Party (2015-2020)
- 28 May – Susan Fitzgerald, British-born Irish actress (d. 2013)
- 29 May – Francis Rossi, rock musician (lead singer, Status Quo)
- 30 May – Bob Willis, cricketer (fast bowler) (died 2019)
- 2 June – Heather Couper, astronomer (died 2020)
- 5 June – Ken Follett, novelist
- 10 June – Phil Redmond, screenwriter and television producer
- 13 June – Red Symons, English-born Australian musician and television personality
- 14 June
  - Jim Lea, glam rock bassist/songwriter (Slade)
  - Alan White, progressive rock drummer (Yes) (died 2022)
- 15 June – Simon Callow, actor
- 21 June
  - John Agard, Guyanese-born poet
  - Stuart Pearson, footballer
- 22 June – Brian Leveson, judge
- 7 July
  - John Lippiett, senior Royal Navy officer
  - Bob Stewart, colonel and politician
- 8 July – Carmel Cryan, actress
- 9 July – Nigel Lythgoe, television producer
- 13 July – Richard Caddel, poet (died 2003)
- 15 July – Trevor Horn, pop singer and producer
- 17 July – Geezer Butler, heavy metal bassist (Black Sabbath)
- 22 July – Geoffrey Durham, entertainer
- 26 July – Roger Taylor, rock drummer (Queen)
- 28 July
  - Simon Kirke, drummer
  - Steve Peregrin Took, singer-songwriter and guitarist (died 1980)
- 6 August – Alan Campbell, clergyman
- 12 August – Mark Knopfler, rock guitarist and singer-songwriter (Dire Straits)
- 15 August
  - Richard Deacon, sculptor
  - Edward McMillan-Scott, lawyer and politician
- 21 August – Rosemary Lenton, para-bowler and wheelchair curler
- 25 August
  - Martin Amis, novelist (died 2023)
  - Ross Davidson, actor (died 2006)
- 28 August – Martin Lamble, British folk rock musician (died 1969)
- 9 September
  - John Curry, figure skater (died 1994)
  - Jolyon Brettingham Smith, composer and radio presenter (died 2008)
- 10 September – Freddy Marks, actor and musician (died 2021)
- 13 September – Linda Colley, historian
- 18 September
  - Mo Mowlam, Labour politician, Secretary of State for Northern Ireland (died 2005)
  - Peter Shilton, footballer
- 19 September – Twiggy, born Lesley Hornby, model
- 23 September – John Connaughton, footballer (died 2022)
- 26 September – Minette Walters, crime writer
- 5 October – Peter Ackroyd, writer and historian
- 8 October – Chris Dobson, chemist (died 2019)
- 19 October – George Fenton, theme music composer (died 2026)
- 20 October – Jane Tucker, actress and musician
- 26 October – Maurice Gran, scriptwriter
- 30 October – Arabella Churchill, charity founder (died 2007)
- 1 November – Gerald Ratner, businessman
- 6 November – John Zarnecki, space scientist
- 7 November – Gerald Ashby, football referee (died 2001)
- 13 November – Terry Reid, musician (died 2025)
- 24 November
  - Nick Ainger, Labour politician
  - Sally Davies, Chief Medical Officer
- 27 November – Brumas, polar bear (first born at London Zoo)
- 4 December – Paul Dickenson, hammer thrower
- 6 December
  - Janet Anderson, politician (died 2023)
  - Peter Willey, cricketer
- 12 December
  - Chris Baillieu, rower and lawyer
  - Bill Nighy, actor
- 13 December – Robert Lindsay, actor
- 16 December
  - Heather Hallett, Baroness Hallett, judge
  - Stephanie Lawrence, singer and actress (died 2000)
- 17 December – Paul Rodgers, rock singer (Free)
- 21 December – Nicholas Penny, art historian and academic
- Michael Houghton, virologist, Nobel Prize winner

== Deaths ==
- 2 January – Jock McNab, footballer (born 1894)
- 9 January – Tommy Handley, radio comedian (born 1892)
- 21 January
  - William Price Drury, novelist, playwright and Royal Marines officer (born 1861)
  - J. H. Thomas, Welsh-born trade unionist and politician (born 1874)
- 22 January – Henry Mond, 2nd Baron Melchett, industrialist and politician (born 1898)
- 10 February – Charles Vane-Tempest-Stewart, 7th Marquess of Londonderry, politician (born 1878)
- 19 March – Sir James Somerville, admiral (born 1882)
- 2 April – George Graves, comic actor (born 1876)
- 6 April – Sir Seymour Hicks, actor (born 1871)
- 14 April – Reginald Hine, local historian and solicitor, suicide (born 1883)
- 18 April – Will Hay, comic actor (born 1888)
- 28 April
  - Sir Robert Robertson, chemist (born 1869)
  - Sir Fabian Ware, founder of the Imperial War Graves Commission (born 1869)
- 21 June – Edward Wadsworth, Vorticist painter (born 1889)
- 9 July – Fritz Hart, composer (born 1874)
- 15 July – Eva Hubback, feminist (born 1886)
- 25 July – Lilian Bowes Lyon, poet (born 1895)
- 31 July – Alfred Bashford, cricketer (born 1881)
- 9 August – G. E. M. Skues, inventor of nymph fly fishing (born 1858)
- 16 August – Tom Wintringham, soldier and politician (born 1898)
- 30 August – Arthur Fielder, cricketer (born 1877)
- 9 September – Fredegond Shove, poet (born 1889)
- 23 October – J. R. Clynes, trade unionist and Labour leader (born 1869)
- 24 October – Thomas Rowland Hughes, writer (born 1903)
- 30 October – Denis Eden, painter (born 1878)
- 27 November – Tom Walls, actor and director (born 1883)
- 30 November – Dame Irene Vanbrugh, actress (born 1872)
- 5 December – Arthur Bedford, navy officer (born 1881)
- 13 December – John Hope, Liberal politician (born 1860)
- 16 December – George Maitland Lloyd Davies, pacifist politician (born 1880)
- 24 December – Gertrude Bacon, aeronautical pioneer (born 1874)

== See also ==
- List of British films of 1949
