= Clarine Seymour =

American actress

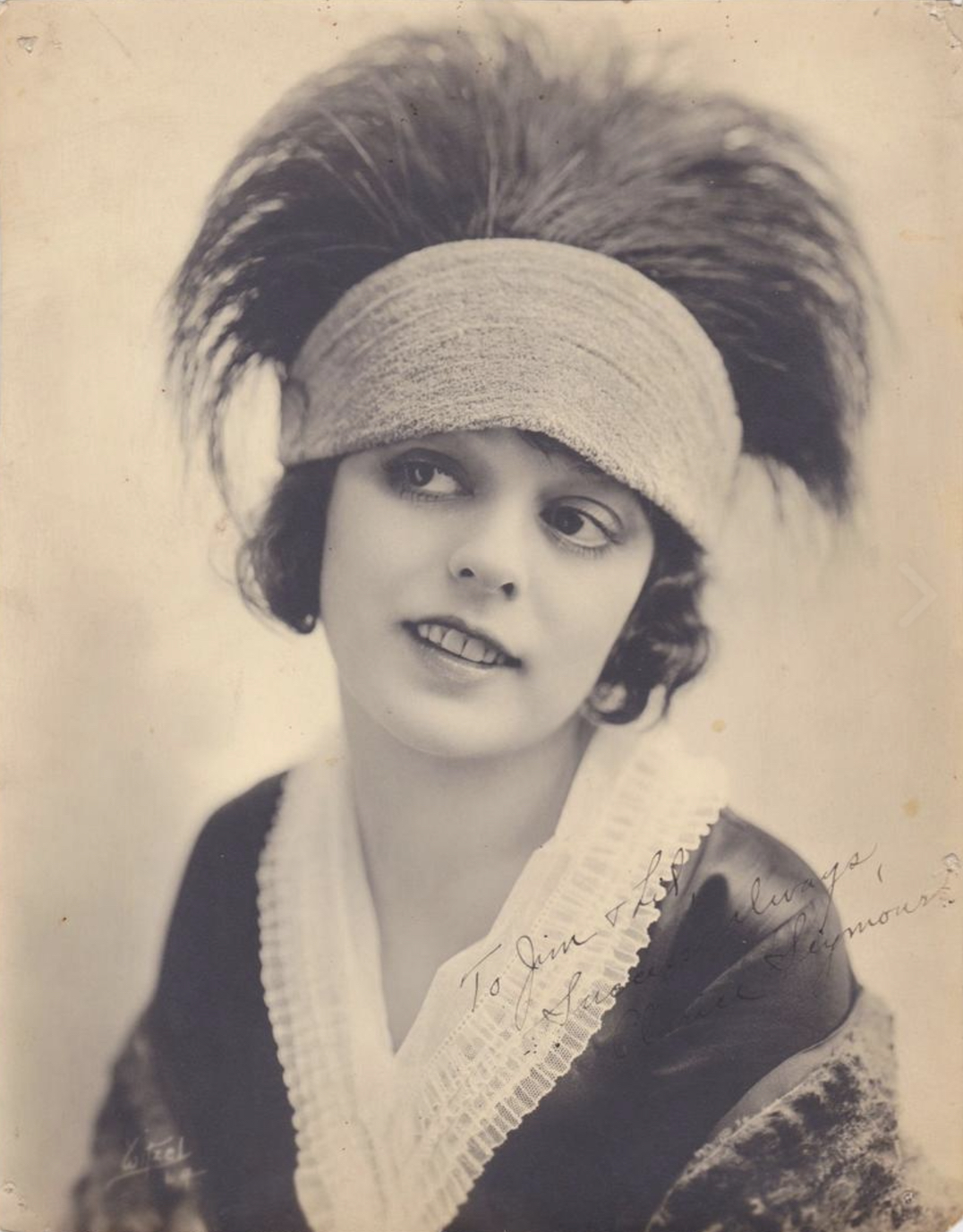
- Seymour c. 1920
- Born: December 9, 1898; Brooklyn, New York City, U.S.
- Died: April 25, 1920 (aged 21); New York City, U.S.
- Resting place: Greenwood Union Cemetery (Rye, New York, U.S.)
- Occupation: Actress
- Years active: 1917–1920

Clarine E. Seymour (December 9, 1898 – April 25, 1920) was an American silent film actress.

== Early life ==
Seymour was the eldest of two children born to Albert V. Seymour and Florence Seymour in Brooklyn, a wealthy couple who were devout Methodists. She had one younger brother. Albert Seymour ran a prosperous ribbon manufacturing business. Seymour began appearing in entertainments at the family's church as a child. In early 1916, Albert Seymour became ill and was forced to close his business.

The family moved to New Rochelle, New York, where Seymour found work at the Thanhouser Film Company as a film extra to help support her family. While at Thanhouser, she appeared in two shorts, Pots-and-Pans Peggy and It Happened to Adele. As a result of her work through the company, she was hired through Pathé in a Pearl White serial.

== Career ==
Seymour c. 1919

In 1917, Seymour appeared in Pathé's Mystery of the Double Cross opposite actress Mollie King. Hal Roach saw her performance and offered her a film contract with his Rolin Film Company. Seymour accepted and relocated to Los Angeles to perform as the leading lady in the Toto the Clown (played by Armando Novello) film comedy serials. Throughout 1918, she appeared in the Toto serial and also had a supporting role in the comedy short Just Rambling Along (1918), opposite Stan Laurel. The deal with Roach soon soured after Seymour claimed she was fired for refusing to do her own stunts. She filed suit against the company and was awarded $1,325 (approximately $28,000 today) in damages. While the case was pending, Seymour appeared in comedy shorts for Al Christie.

In 1918, Seymour met Victor Heerman. Heerman directed a screen test featuring Seymour and one of D. W. Griffith's Artcraft stock company actors Robert Harron. Griffith was pleased with the pairing and with Seymour's knack for light comedy and hired her as member of his stock company. Griffith cast Seymour with Harron, Richard Barthelmess and Carol Dempster in the drama The Girl Who Stayed at Home (1919). Although the film was not well received by critics, Seymour's performance was and the public interest in her began to grow. Later that year, she was paired with Robert Harron again in True Heart Susie (1919) which also featured Lillian Gish. Seymour followed with role in Scarlet Days (1919), also opposite Richard Barthelmess and Carol Dempster. In 1920, Griffith cast Seymour in the lead role in The Idol Dancer. The film was not well received by audiences but they were taken by Seymour's performance. Shortly after the film's release, Seymour was featured on the cover of Motion Picture Magazine.

Literary and film critic Edward Wagenknecht provides this portrait of Clarine Seymour: “Miss Seymour was a real discovery. A tiny girl with enormous eyes, she was as dark and vivacious as Griffith’s heroines had been blonde and wistful, a delightful girl of excellent character, whom everybody in the studio loved…” Wagenknecht laments her death in 1920, and “what almost certainly [would] have been an important film career.”

== Death ==
In early 1920, Griffith again cast Seymour, this time in Way Down East. Halfway through filming, on April 21, Seymour fell ill due to intestinal strangulation. She was taken to Misericordia Hospital in New York City for treatment, but her condition did not improve and she underwent emergency surgery. She developed pneumonia and died on April 25, 1920. Seymour is buried in Greenwood Union Cemetery in Rye, New York.

Actress Mary Hay was cast in Seymour's role for Way Down East, and her part was reshot. Footage of Seymour in long shots can be seen in the finished film. On September 26, a memorial service for Seymour, Ormer Locklear, Olive Thomas, and Robert Harron, who died of an accidental self-inflicted gunshot wound two days after the premiere of Way Down East, was held at the Robert Brunton Studios. All four died that year and were eulogized by director William Desmond Taylor. Taylor was murdered less than 18 months later; his killer was never caught.

== Filmography ==
Year	Title	Role	Notes
1917	The Mystery of the Double Cross		Serial
1917	Pots-and-Pans Peggy		
1917	It Happened to Adele	Mary	
1918	A One Night Stand		
1918	Fare, Please		Short subject
1918	His Busy Day		Short subject
1918	The Furniture Movers		Short subject
1918	Fire the Cook		Short subject
1918	Beach Nuts		Short subject
1918	Do Husbands Deceive?		Short subject
1918	Nipped in the Bud		Short subject
1918	The Dippy Daughter		Short subject
1918	Just Rambling Along	Pretty Lady	Short subject
1918	An Enemy of Soap		Short subject
1918	Check Your Baggage		Short subject
1919	Hustling for Health	Mr. Spotless's Daughter	Uncredited; Short subject
1919	Toto's Troubles		Short subject
1919	The Girl Who Stayed at Home	Cutie Beautiful	
1919	True Heart Susie	Bettina Hopkins	Alternative titles: The Story of a Plain Girl; True Heart Susie the Story of a Plain Girl
1919	Scarlet Days	Chiquita aka Little Flameheart	
1920	The Idol Dancer	Mary	
1920	Way Down East	Kate, the Squire's niece	Footage removed/reshot
