= Scarlet Days =

1919 film directed by D. W. Griffith

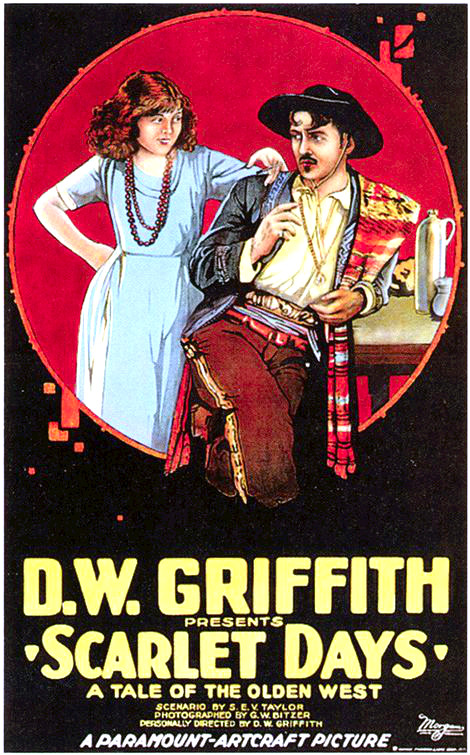
- Film poster
- Directed by: D. W. Griffith
- Written by: Stanner E. V. Taylor (original story, scenario)
- Produced by: D. W. Griffith
- Starring: Richard Barthelmess; Clarine Seymour
- Cinematography: G. W. Bitzer
- Edited by: James Smith
- Distributed by: Paramount Pictures/Artcraft
- Release date: November 30, 1919 (U.S.)
- Running time: 7 reels (6,916 feet)
- Country: U.S.
- Language: Silent (English intertitles)

Scarlet Days

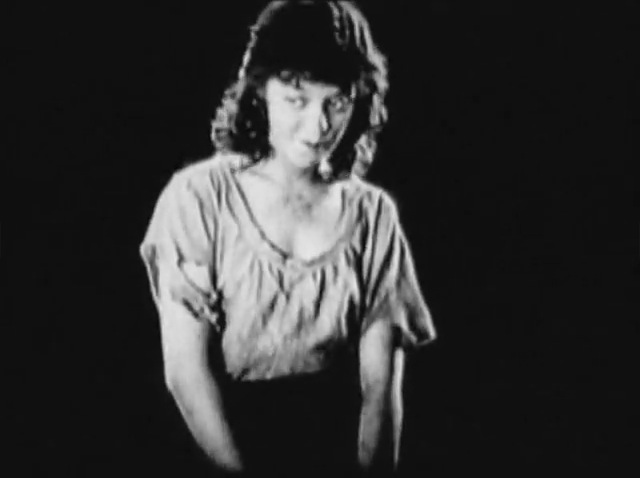
Clarine Seymour as Chiquita

Scarlet Days is a 1919 American silent Western film produced and directed by D. W. Griffith and released through Paramount/Artcraft Pictures, Artcraft being an affiliate of Paramount. Richard Barthelmess stars in a role for which Griffith had screentested Rudolph Valentino. The film is considered by many to be one of Griffith's worst, though it might have worked better as a short film. This film was unlike others created by Griffith. According to an article written for The Cincinnati Enquirer on November 16, 1919: "Unlike other recent Griffith production, Scarlet Days is a story of the old West, of the gold rush days of 49- Bret Harte transferred to the screen!" The Western film genre was expanding at this time and Scarlet Days fits into this category.

Considered a lost film, a print was found in the State Film Archives of the Soviet Union, which donated it to the Museum of Modern Art in 1969. The film was screened to the public, for the first time since its rediscovery, on March 24 and 25, 1969. Scarlet Days was shown alongside another missing film, A Romance of Happy Valley, at the Museum of Modern Art's auditorium with titles still printed in Russian. English titles were later created by the Department of Film at the Museum of Modern Art.

== Plot ==
Rosie Nell, a dance hall performer in early frontier California, is falsely accused of murdering a fellow entertainer. Her daughter, Lady Fair, unaware of her mother's occupation, is due to return from school in the East. Rosie Nell is granted a three-day reprieve to spend time with her daughter in a nearby cabin.

During this time, the dance hall manager, King Bagley, becomes infatuated with Lady Fair and attempts to take her by force. Rosie Nell and her daughter barricade themselves in the cabin. Alvarez, a notorious outlaw, aids in their defense. John Randolph, who is also in love with Lady Fair, joins their efforts.

Following several confrontations, the sheriff arrives in time to prevent further violence. His intervention ends the confrontation.

== Cast ==
- Richard Barthelmess as Alvarez
- Eugenie Besserer as Rosie Nell
- Carol Dempster as Lady Fair
- Clarine Seymour as Chiquita
- Ralph Graves as Randolph
- George Fawcett as the sheriff
- Walter Long as King Bagley
- Kate Bruce as aunt
- Rhea Haines as Spasm Sal
- Adolph Lestina as Randolph's friend
- Herbert Sutch as the second sheriff
- J. Wesley Warner as Alvarez's man

== Reception ==
Public response to this film was positive during its release in November 1919. Many news sources in 1919 published reviews complimenting and comparing Scarlet Days to other films created by D. W. Griffith. News outlets such as the New-York Tribune, San Francisco Chronicle, and Cincinnati Enquirer published reviews of Scarlet Days as well as announcing local showtimes for the film. A review in the Cincinnati Enquirer stated: "The latest D. W. Griffith production soon will be ready for local release. Griffith as usual has assembled a sparkling cast for his new picture." Scarlet Days traveled across the country to show in various theaters after its release. Prior to the showing, news articles would be released to inform readers of short plot summaries and events in the production.

Variety wrote on Scarlet Days negatively, and claimed that "Scarlet Days as a story was not worthy of Griffith's direction in picturization. It is entire too commonplace." For current-day moviegoers, this film is one of the least popular of Griffith's directed pictures. Scarlet Days was considered to be made too late in the era where Western films were becoming popular. Though some sources gave positive feedback in response to the release of this film, opposing viewpoints claimed that "Outside of [the lack of plot depth] there is nothing more to say except that it is a surprise that Griffith should at this late date take to filming rip-snorting Western mellers with a lot of harum-scarum rough stuff with gunplay."
