= Billy Bitzer =

American cinematographer (1872–1944)

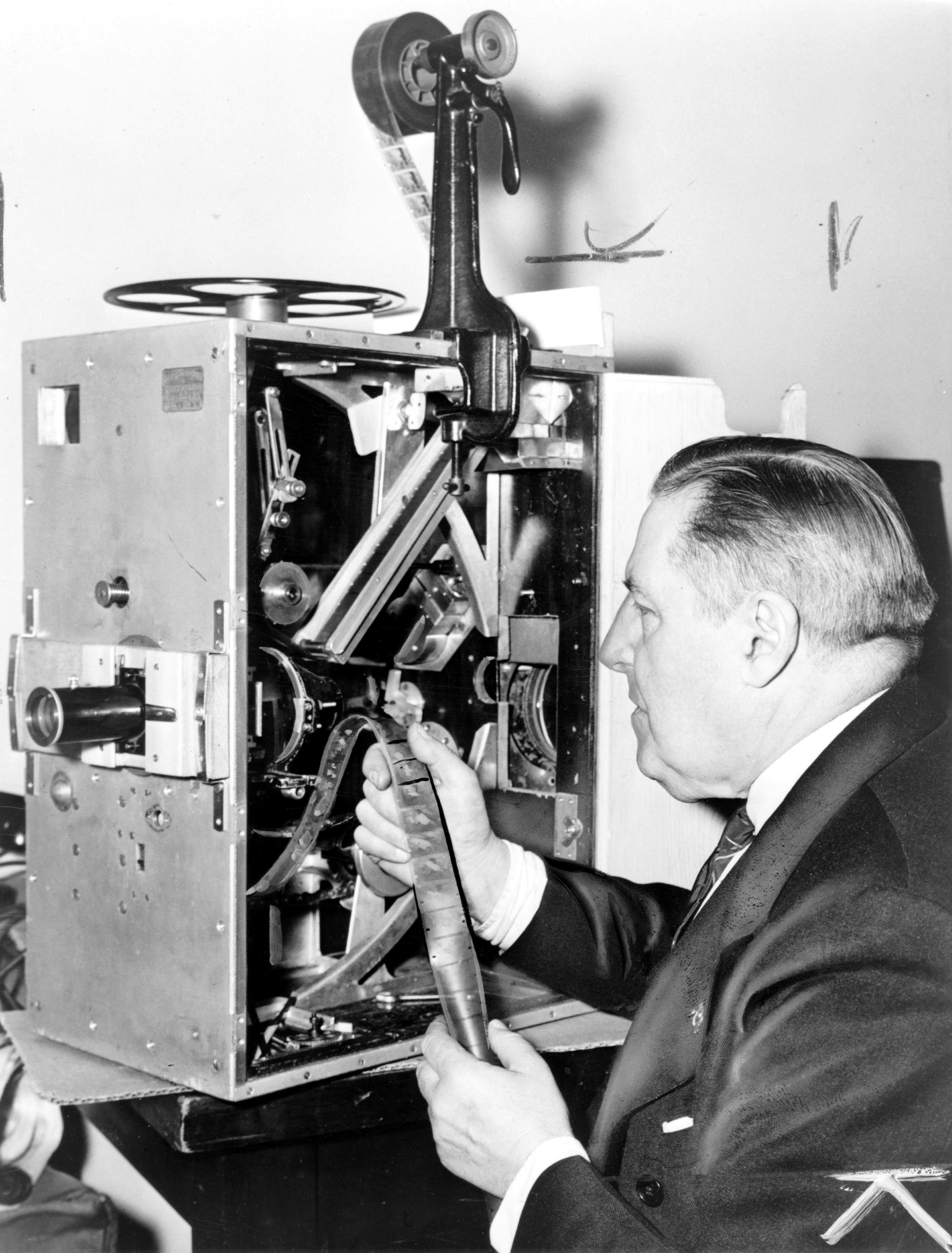
- Bitzer, c. 1935
- Born: Johann Gottfried Wilhelm Bitzer; April 21, 1872; Boston, Massachusetts, U.S.
- Died: April 29, 1944 (aged 72); Los Angeles, California, U.S.
- Occupation: Cinematographer

Gottfried Wilhelm Bitzer (April 21, 1872 – April 29, 1944) was an American cinematographer. He was a close associate of D. W. Griffith. He introduced various innovations in cinematography.

== Career ==
Prior to his career as a cameraman, Bitzer worked as a motion picture projectionist. He developed early cinematic technologies for the American Mutoscope Company, eventually to become the Biograph Company. He admired and learned the art of motion picture photography from Kinetoscope inventor W. K. L. Dickson, who directed the early Biograph shorts on which Bitzer cut his teeth.

Bitzer achieved success in 1896 when his film of William McKinley being notified of the presidential nomination of his party was exhibited on the Biograph Company's first program. Until 1903, Bitzer was employed by Biograph primarily as a documentary photographer, and from 1903 onward primarily as the photographer of narrative films, as these gained popularity.

In 1908, Bitzer entered into his first collaboration with Griffith. The two would work together for the rest of Bitzer's career, leaving Biograph in 1913 for the Mutual Film Corporation where Bitzer continued to innovate, perfecting existing technologies and inventing new ones. During this time he pioneered the field of matte photography and made use of innovative lighting techniques, closeups, and iris shots.

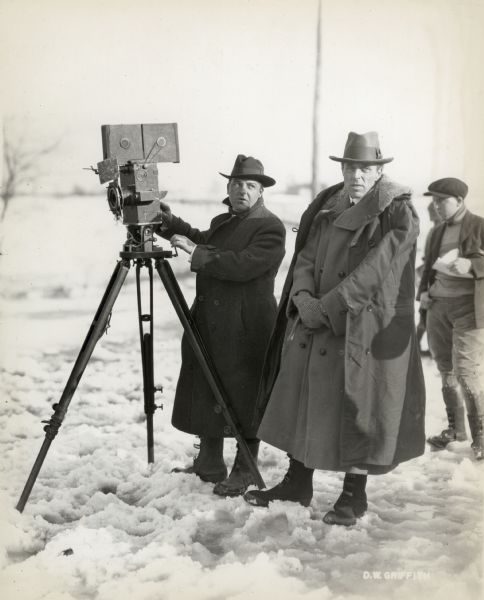
Bitzer (behind Pathé camera) with Griffith on location for Way Down East (1920)

Bitzer provided assistance during Griffith's directorial debut, 1908's The Adventures of Dollie, which was shot by Arthur Marvin. He eventually succeeded Marvin as Griffith's regular cinematographer, working with him on some of his most important films and contributing significantly to cinematic innovations attributed to Griffith.

In 1910, he photographed Griffith's silent short In Old California in the Los Angeles village of "Hollywoodland", qualifying Bitzer as, arguably, Hollywood's first Director of Photography. The apex of Bitzer and Griffith's collaboration came with The Birth of a Nation (1915), a film funded in part by Bitzer's life savings, and the epic Intolerance (1916).

His film The Jeffries-Sharkey Fight of 1899 is the first known use of artificial light. Rip Van Winkle (1903) features the first known close-up. Advances in lenses and filters developed by Bitzer made soft focus possible. He was the first to use split-screen photography and backlighting, contributing to the development of three-point lighting. He improved in-camera fade and dissolve effects and invented what came to be known as transition tools. Even after the Bell & Howell Model 2709 production camera became the industry standard, he continued to use a Pathe.

For all his innovation, Bitzer's career did not survive the industry's transition to sound. In 1944, he suffered a heart attack and died in Hollywood.

His autobiography, Billy Bitzer: His Story, was published posthumously in 1973.

In 2003, a survey conducted by the International Cinematographers Guild named him one of the ten most influential cinematographers in history. Bitzer, it is said, "developed camera techniques that set the standard for all future motion pictures".

== Selected filmography ==
PLAY Edgar Allan Poe (1909), a silent film by D.W. Griffith (director), Frank E. Woods (screenwriter), and Billy Bitzer (camera), inspired by Poe's poem "The Raven"; runtime 00:08:18

- The Moonshiner (1904)
- Interior New York Subway, 14th Street to 42nd Street (1905)
- 2 A. M. in the Subway (1905)
- Fights of Nations (1907)
- Rube Brown in Town (1907), lost film
- Mrs. Smithers' Boarding-School (1907), lost film
- A Tenderloin Tragedy (1907), lost film
- The Kentuckian (1908)
- The Invisible Fluid (1908)
- The Lonely Villa (1909)
- A Sound Sleeper (1909)
- The Sealed Room (1909)
- Edgar Allan Poe (1909)
- A Corner in Wheat (1909)
- In the Border States (1910)
- The Modern Prodigal (1910)
- A Mohawk's Way (1910)
- The Lonedale Operator (1911)
- Enoch Arden (1911)
- The Girl and Her Trust (1912)
- The Female of the Species (1912)
- A Beast at Bay (1912)
- The Root of Evil (1912)
- An Unseen Enemy (1912)
- The Painted Lady (1912)
- The Musketeers of Pig Alley (1912)
- The House of Darkness (1913)
- Death's Marathon (1913)
- The Mothering Heart (1913)
- The Yaqui Cur (1913)
- The Battle at Elderbush Gulch (1914)
- Judith of Bethulia (1914)
- The Avenging Conscience (1914)
- The Birth of a Nation (1915)
- Intolerance (1916)
- Hearts of the World (1918)
- The Great Love (1918)
- The Greatest Thing in Life (1918)
- A Romance of Happy Valley (1919)
- The Girl Who Stayed at Home (1919)
- True Heart Susie (1919)
- Scarlet Days (1919)
- Broken Blossoms (1919)
- The Greatest Question (1919)
- The Idol Dancer (1920)
- The Love Flower (1920)
- Way Down East (1920)
- The White Rose (1923)
- America (1924)
- Drums of Love (1927)
- The Battle of the Sexes (1928)
- Lady of the Pavements (1929)
