= Carol Dempster =

American actress (1901–1991)

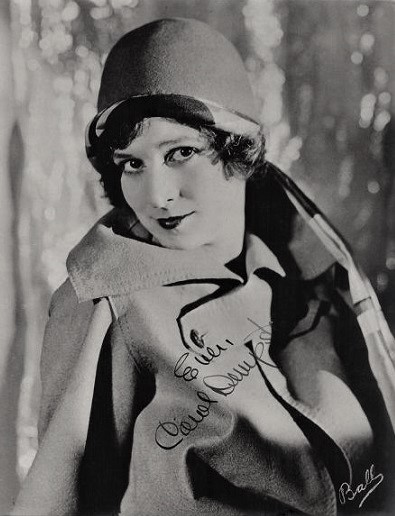
- Dempster in 1920
- Born: December 9, 1901; Duluth, Minnesota, U.S.
- Died: February 1, 1991 (aged 89); La Jolla, California, U.S.
- Resting place: Forest Lawn Memorial Park, Glendale, California, U.S.
- Occupation: Actress
- Years active: 1916–1926
- Spouse: Edwin S. Larsen (m. 1926; died 1978)

Carol Dempster (December 9, 1901 – February 1, 1991) was an American film actress of the silent film era. She appeared in films from 1916 to 1926, working with D. W. Griffith extensively.

== Early years ==
Born in Duluth, Minnesota, Dempster was the daughter of a captain on the Great Lakes and the youngest of four children. The family moved to California when her father decided to change careers. While dancing in a school program, Dempster was noticed by Ruth St. Denis and went on to become the youngest graduate in the first class of St. Denis's school of dance.

== Career ==
Dempster's first feature role came in 1919 in the Griffith-directed The Girl Who Stayed at Home opposite Robert "Bobby" Harron. Dempster followed this with Griffith's The Love Flower (1920), Dream Street (1921), One Exciting Night (1922) and Isn't Life Wonderful (1924), America (1924), Sally of the Sawdust (1925), and That Royle Girl (1925). Dempster appeared opposite such notable actors as John Barrymore, Richard Barthelmess, William Powell, Ivor Novello, and W. C. Fields.

In 1926 Dempster acted in her final film, a Griffith vehicle entitled The Sorrows of Satan (1926), co-starring Adolphe Menjou, Ricardo Cortez, and the Hungarian vamp Lya De Putti. Dempster then retired from the screen to marry wealthy banker Edwin S. Larson in 1926.

"Griffith made three films at Paramount's Astoria Studios, each marked by his increasing obsession with his then inamorata, another ex-Denishawn dancer named Carol Dempster...her talents have received as little respect from historians as they did at the time from her co-workers. To Griffith's biographer Richard Schickel, Dempster was a 'mildly attractive young woman' who moved well but photographed badly. Actress Louise Brooks described her as unfriendly and withdrawn. Ed Falherty, a longtime studio gaffer who observed everything and everyone from high up in the grid, remembered icily: 'she had nothing.'"—Film historian Richard Koszarski in Hollywood on the Hudson (2008).

Dempster's critical stock was never very high, in part because she was unable to live up to the performances of Lillian Gish, whom she replaced as Griffith's leading lady. Her somewhat "ordinary" appearance and animated acting style were frequently criticized. Also, with a few exceptions, the films she appeared in were not among Griffith's more popular works. In recent years, however, viewers and critics alike have slowly begun to appreciate her performances, particularly in two later films, Isn't Life Wonderful and The Sorrows of Satan.

== Death ==
Dempster died in La Jolla, California, in 1991 at the age of 89 from heart failure and was buried at the Forest Lawn Memorial Park cemetery in Glendale, California. Upon her death, Dempster left $1.6 million to the San Diego Museum of Art, which was used to expand the museum's collections of prints and drawings.

== Filmography ==
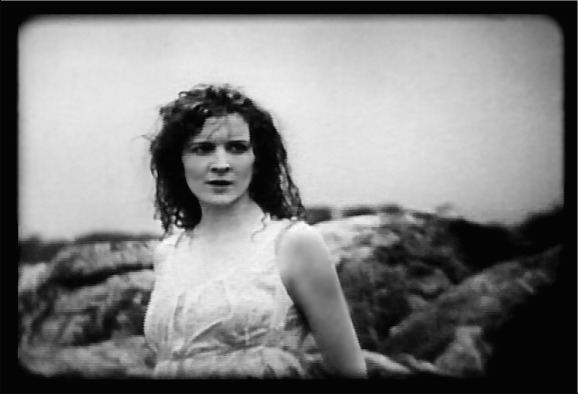
Carol Dempster in The Love Flower (1920)

All features were directed by D. W. Griffith except Sherlock Holmes, which was directed by Albert Parker. The Hope Chest, a product of the New Art Film Company from 1918, was produced by Griffith but directed by Elmer Clifton.

Year	Title	Role	Notes
1916	Intolerance	Dancer	Uncredited
1918	Lillian Gish in a Liberty Loan Appeal	Lillian's Sister	Short; Lost film
1918	The Greatest Thing in Life	Dancer	Uncredited; Lost film
1918	The Hope Chest	Ethel Hoyt	Undetermined / presumably lost
1919	A Romance of Happy Valley	Girl John Logan meets in New York	Uncredited
1919	The Girl Who Stayed at Home	Acoline France	
1919	True Heart Susie	Bettina's friend	
1919	Scarlet Days	Lady Fair	
1920	The Love Flower	Stella Bevan	
1920	Way Down East	Barn dancer	Uncredited
1921	Dream Street	Gypsy Fair	
1922	Sherlock Holmes	Alice Faulkner	
1922	One Exciting Night	Agnes Harrington	
1923	The White Rose	Marie Carrington	
1924	America	Miss Nancy Montague	
1924	Isn't Life Wonderful	Inga	
1925	Sally of the Sawdust	Sally	
1925	That Royle Girl	Joan Daisy Royle	Lost film
1926	The Sorrows of Satan	Mavis Claire	

== Sources ==
- Gish, Lillian (1969). The Movies, Mr. Griffith and Me. Englewood Cliffs, NJ: Prentice-Hall. ISBN 978-0-13-536482-6.
- Geduld, Harry M. (1971). Focus on D.W. Griffith. Englewood Cliffs, NJ: Prentice-Hall. ISBN 978-0-13-365205-5.
- Brown, Karl (1973). Adventures with D.W. Griffith. New York: Farrar, Straus and Giroux. ISBN 978-0-374-10093-3.
- Koszarski, Richard. 2008. Hollywood on the Hudson: Film and Television in New York from Griffith to Sarnoff. Rutgers University Press. ISBN 978-0-8135-4293-5
