= Lillian Gish in a Liberty Loan Appeal =

1918 film

- Directed by: D. W. Griffith
- Written by: D. W. Griffith
- Produced by: D. W. Griffith
- Starring: Lillian Gish
- Distributed by: Paramount Pictures
- Release date: October 1918 (U.S.)
- Running time: 10 minutes
- Country: U.S.
- Language: Silent (English intertitles)

Lillian Gish in a Liberty Loan Appeal is a 1918 American silent short film directed by D. W. Griffith, produced to support the Liberty bond drive of 1918, the film is now considered to be a lost film.

== Plot ==
Lillian wants to buy clothes, but her mother suggests it would be more patriotic to invest in Liberty bonds. While asleep, Lillian dreams of German war atrocities and awakens determined to buy bonds instead of clothes.

== Cast ==
- Lillian Gish
- Kate Bruce
- Carol Dempster
- George Fawcett
