= James and Rose Smith =

American film editor

James Smith
- Born: March 7, 1892; Staten Island, New York City, U.S.
- Died: July 21, 1975 (aged 83); Los Angeles, California, U.S.
- Occupation: Film editor
- Employer: American Mutoscope and Biograph Company 1921–1930, Paramount Pictures 1935–1941, United Artist Media Group 1944–1947

James Smith and Rose Smith (née Richter) were film editors known for their work in the early days of Hollywood, specifically for their work at the American Mutoscope and Biograph Company working as editors for D. W. Griffith.

Rose Smith
- Born: Rose Richter; March 6, 1897; New York, U.S.
- Died: May 30, 1962 (aged 65); Glendale, California, U.S.
- Occupation: Film editor
- Employer: American Mutoscope and Biograph Company 1921–1930, Paramount Pictures 1935–1941, United Artist Media Group 1944–1947

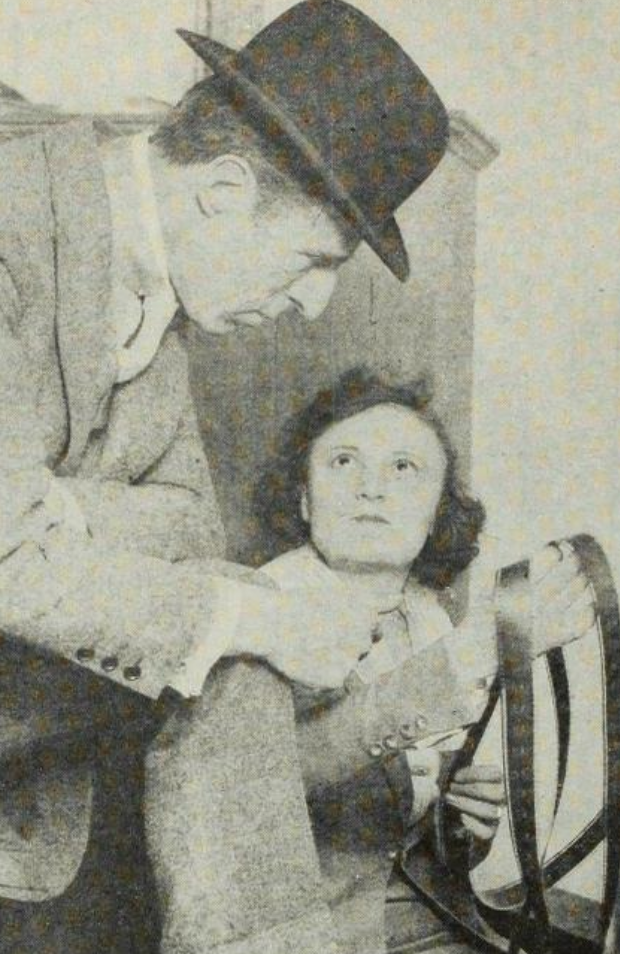
D.W. Griffith and Rose Smith c. 1920

== James's career ==
James is credited in two films for acting early in his career and is also credited as editor in 75 films and TV shows from 1909 to 1958. While working at Biograph, he worked his way up the company starting as a worker in the shipping room to being promoted to editor. Smith is most well known for his work with D. W. Griffith. Richard Schickel described Smith's role with Griffith as "a skilled and very difficult task" because Griffith hardly ever worked according to script while working on feature films.

He was one of Griffith's most important editors during his tenure at the Biograph Company, the other one being Robert Harron, who like Smith worked his was up the company to actor and editor starting from prop boy. Griffith enjoyed working with Smith so much that he could often be found working with him in the editing room. Jimmie would work with Griffith from 1921 until 1930 and then go on to work for Paramount Pictures from 1935 until 1941. After working at Paramount for six years, he would work at United Artist Media Group from 1944 to 1947.

== Rose's career ==
Rose Smith is credited as an actress in one film and in 19 films for her work as editor. According to IMDb, Rose Smith was not credited on-screen for six of the films she edited. She was known or credited as Rose Richter, her maiden name.

As an early woman in the film industry Rose faced scrutiny and was not credited in many movies she had worked on, including D. W. Griffith's Intolerance and The Avenging Conscience. The Los Angeles Times described Rose's devotion to Griffith in 1925 when they reported that she had "been a cutter for D.W. Griffith since her little girl days."

James Smith(?unconfirmed) and wife editor Rose Smith

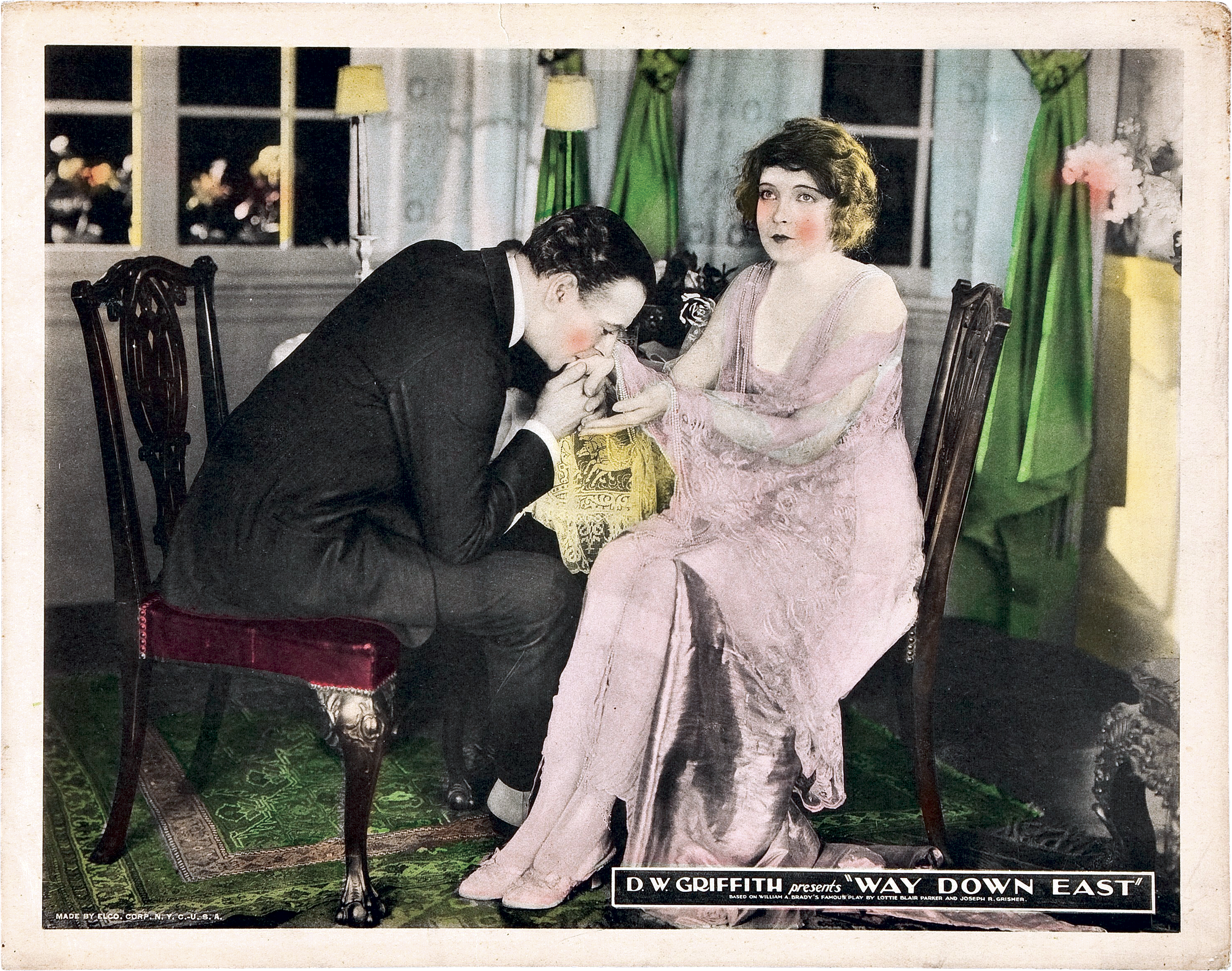
A still from Way Down East, D.W. Griffith (1920) Rose Smith (e.)

== Biograph Company ==
The Smiths are both best known for their work at the Biograph Company, also known as the American Mutoscope and Biograph Company. As editors they worked on D. W. Griffith's controversial film The Birth of a Nation. This was one of the first films in which Rose joined Jimmie in the editing room for Griffith. Other films which Jimmie and Rose worked together on for Griffith included A Corner in Wheat, Abraham Lincoln, and Orphans of the Storm. Both Jimmie and Rose would show their devotion to their work and Griffith as they began work in New York then move with Griffith to California, the new hub of cinema.

== End of career ==
Rose edited her last film Public Stenographer in 1934. Rose had a much shorter tenure in cinema then Jimmie due to her death on May 29, 1962, at the age of 65 in Glendale, California. James continued on his career in film long after Rose's career had ended, eventually moving from films into TV series in the 1950s; however, his career ended in 1958 shortly before Rose's death. James died on July 21, 1975, at the age of 83 in Los Angeles, California.

== James's filmography ==
Editor

- Bat Masterson (TV Series, 1 Episode, 1958)
  - Double Showdown (1958)
- Tombstone Territory (TV Series, 9 Episodes, 1958)
  - Fight for a Fugitive (1958
  - The Lady Gambler (1958)
  - Pick up the Gun (1958)
  - Triangle of Death (1958)
  - Doc Holliday in Durango (1958)
  - The Tin Gunman (1958)
  - Geronimo (1958)
  - Johnny Ringo's Last Ride (1958)
- Thicker Than Water (1958) ... (as James E. Smith)
- Highway Patrol (TV Series, 1 Episode, 1958)
  - Foster Child (1958)
- Mackenzie's Raiders (TV Series, 1 Episode, 1958)
  - Death by the Numbers (1958)
- Crossroads (TV Series, 5 Episodes, 1956–57)
  - Call for Help (1957)
  - Timberland Preacher (1956)
  - Sky Pilot of the Cumberlands (1956)
  - The Judge (1956)
  - Lifeline (1956)
  - Dig or Die, Brother Hyde (1956)
  - The Bowery Bishop (1956)
  - Mother O'Brien (1956)
- My Hero (TV Series, 4 Episodes, 1952–53)
  - Beauty Queen (1953) ... (as James E. Smith)
  - The Boat (1953) ... (as James E. Smith)
  - Model of Blossom (1952) ... (as James E. Smith)
  - The Cupid (1952) ... (as James E. Smith)
- The Bigelow Theatre (TV Series, 1 Episode, 1951)
  - Crossroad (1951)
- The Girl from Manhattan (1948)
- Lulu Belle (1948)
- Christmas Eve (1947)
- Mr. Ace (1946)
- Bedside Manner (1945)
- A Song for Miss Julie (1945)
- Dark Waters (1944)
- Sensations of 1945 (1944)
- New Wine (1941)
- The Hard-Boiled Canary (1941)
- The Great Victor Herbert (as Jimmy Smith) (1939)
- Disputed Passage (as Jimmy Smith) (1939)
- The Magnificent Fraud (1939)
- Never Say Die (1939)
- Ride a Crooked Mile (1938)
- Romance in the Dark (1938)
- Scandal Street (1938)
- Bulldog Drummond Comes Back (1937)
- Night of Mystery (1937)
- The Crime Nobody Saw (1937)
- Murder with Pictures (1936)
- Yours for the Asking (1936)
- Florida Special (1936)
- The Preview Murder Mystery (1936)
- Ship Cafe (1935)
- Two-Fisted (1935)
- Father Brown, Detective (1934)
- The Pursuit of Happiness (uncredited) (1934)
- The Notorious Sophie Lang (uncredited) (1934)
- Double Door (1934)
- Come On Marines! (1934)
- Search for Beauty (uncredited) (1934)
- Miss Fane's Baby Is Stolen (uncredited) (1934)
- Tillie and Gus (uncredited) (1933)
- The Eagle and the Hawk (1933)
- Hello, Everybody! (uncredited) (1933)
- The Bat Whispers (1930)
- Abraham Lincoln (film editor) (1930)
- One Romantic Night (1930)
- Lady of the Pavements (1929)
- The Battle of the Sexes (film edited by) (1928)
- Drums of Love (1928)
- The Sorrows of Satan (1926)
- That Royle Girl (1925)
- Sally of the Sawdust (1925)
- America (1924)
- Orphans of the Storm (1921)
- Dream Street (1921)
- Way Down East (uncredited) (1920)
- The Love Flower (1920)
- The Idol Dancer (1920)
- The Greatest Question (1919)
- Scarlet Days (1919)
- True Heart Susie (1919)
- Broken Blossoms or The Yellow Man and the Girl (uncredited) (1919)
- The Girl Who Stayed at Home (1919)
- A Romance of Happy Valley (1919)
- The Greatest Thing in Life (1918)
- The Great Love (1918)
- Hearts of the World (uncredited) (1918)
- Intolerance (uncredited) (1916)
- The Birth of a Nation (1915)
- The Avenging Conscience: or "Thou Shalt Not Kill" (uncredited) (1914)
- The Escape (uncredited) (1914)
- Home, Sweet Home (uncredited) (1914)
- The Battle of the Sexes (uncredited) (1914)
- Judith of Bethulia (1914)
- A Corner in Wheat (Short) (1909)

Editorial Department (3 Credits)

- On Our Merry Way (Supervising Editor, 1948)
- The Diary of a Chambermaid (Supervising Editor, 1946)
- Captain Kidd (Supervising Editor, 1945)

Actor (2 Credits)

- Orphans of the Storm (Dancer, 1921)
- What Happened to Mary (Stage Manager, 1912)

== Rose's filmography ==
Editor

- Public Stenographer (1934)
- Ship of Wanted Men (1933)
- Police Call (1933)
- Found Alive (1933)
- The Pay-Off (1930)
- Black Waters (1929)
- The Monkey Talks (1927)
- Fig Leaves (1926)
- America (1924)
- Orphans of the Storm (1921)
- Dream Street (1921)
- Way Down East (uncredited) (1920)
- Hearts of the World (uncredited) (1918)
- Intolerance (uncredited) (1916)
- The Birth of a Nation (1915)
- The Avenging Conscience: or "Thou Shalt Not Kill" (uncredited) (1914)
- The Escape (1914)
- Home, Sweet Home (uncredited) (1914)
- The Battle of the Sexes (uncredited) (1914)

Actress

- Orphans of the Storm (Dancer, 1921)
