= The Idol Dancer =

1920 film by D. W. Griffith

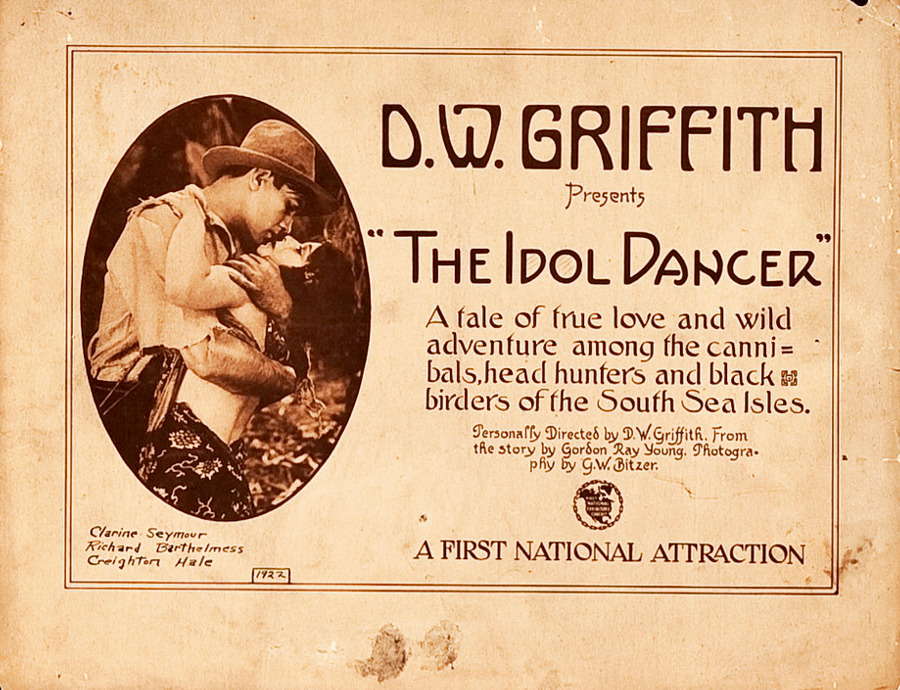
- The 1920 promotional posted for The Idol Dancer
- Directed by: D. W. Griffith
- Written by: Stanner E. V. Taylor
- Based on: "Blood of the Covenants" by Gordon Ray Young
- Produced by: D. W. Griffith
- Starring: Richard Barthelmess; Clarine Seymour
- Cinematography: Paul H. Allen; G. W. Bitzer
- Edited by: James Smith
- Distributed by: First National Pictures
- Release date: March 21, 1920 (U.S.)
- Running time: 104 minutes 92 minutes
- Country: U.S.
- Language: Silent (English intertitles)
- Budget: $93,000
- Box office: $963,000

The Idol Dancer

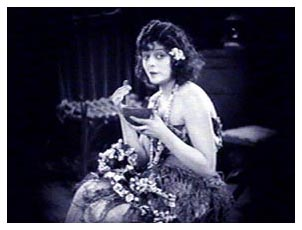
Clarine Seymour in the film

The Idol Dancer is a 1920 American silent South Seas drama film produced and directed by D. W. Griffith. It stars Richard Barthelmess and Clarine Seymour in her final film role. Seymour was a young actress Griffith was grooming for stardom. She died of pneumonia shortly after emergency surgery for an intestinal blockage on April 24, 1920, less than a month after the film premiered.

The film is based on the story "Blood of the Covenants" by Gordon Ray Young. The scenario was written by Stanner E. V. Taylor.

== Plot ==
Mary is the daughter of a French man and a Javanese mother and enjoys dancing. She has two lovers. One is a beachcomber named MacGuire, who was tossed off a passing ship for failing to work and only seeks to drink gin. The other, named Kincaid, is a sickly young American who came to the island in hopes of regaining his health and is staying with his missionary uncle, named Reverend Blythe, and his wife.

While on the island, natives from a neighboring island attack. The beachcomber reforms, and Mary comes to love him.

== Cast ==
- Richard Barthelmess as Dan McGuire, a beachcomber
- Clarine Seymour as Mary
- Creighton Hale as Walter Kincaid
- George MacQuarrie as Reverend Franklyn Blythe
- Kate Bruce as Mrs. Blythe
- Porter Strong as Reverend Peter
- Anders Randolf as the blackbirder
- Walter James as Chief Wando
- Thomas Carr as Donald Blythe
- Herbert Sutch as Old Thomas
- Adolph Lestina as black slave
- Ben Grauer as native boy
- Walter Kolomoku as native musician
- Florence Short as Pansy

== Production ==
Griffith filmed exteriors for The Idol Dancer simultaneously with The Love Flower, including filming in Nassau, Bahamas in December 1919 and in Fort Lauderdale, Florida in 1920.

== Status ==
A 35mm print of the film is preserved by the Cohen Media Group. 16mm prints of the film are held in private collections.

== See also ==
- South Seas genre
