= Heroes for Sale (film) =

1933 film

- Theatrical release poster
- Directed by: William A. Wellman
- Written by: Robert Lord; Wilson Mizner
- Produced by: Hal B. Wallis (uncredited)
- Starring: Richard Barthelmess; Aline MacMahon; Loretta Young
- Cinematography: James Van Trees
- Edited by: Howard Bretherton
- Music by: Bernhard Kaun (uncredited)
- Production company: First National Pictures
- Distributed by: Warner Bros. Pictures
- Release date: June 17, 1933
- Running time: 76 min. (1933 release); 71 min. (TCM print)
- Country: United States
- Language: English

Heroes for Sale is a 1933 American pre-Code tragedy film directed by William A. Wellman, starring Richard Barthelmess, Aline MacMahon, and Loretta Young, and released by Warner Bros. Pictures through its subsidiary First National Pictures. The 76-minute original is considered lost, but a 71-minute version is available from Turner Entertainment Co.

== Plot ==
During World War I, working class Tom Holmes and his wealthy friend and superior officer Roger Winston are sent to capture a German soldier, but Roger loses his nerve. Tom completes their objective alone, but is then hit by shrapnel and apparently killed, leaving it to Roger to return the captive to the American lines. Roger's feeble efforts to refuse credit are dismissed as modesty, and he is rewarded with a Distinguished Service Cross. Meanwhile, Tom is found alive by German soldiers and taken to a hospital. His life is saved, but he is left in severe pain, for which he is given morphine pills.

After the armistice, Tom is part of a prisoner exchange. Roger is shocked to see him on the boat home, but Tom indicates no desire to reveal the truth of their mission, and Roger gets Tom a job at his father's bank. However, Tom has become dependent on morphine, and, eventually, this costs him the job. He is sent to treatment, and emerges sober, but unemployed and without a family, his mother having died the day after he was committed.

Tom goes to Chicago, where he finds an apartment over a diner run by the kindhearted Pa Dennis and his daughter Mary. He quickly strikes up a romance with his neighbor Ruth Loring, and gets a job as a driver for South Park Laundries. The owner, George Gibson, quickly notices Tom's ability and intelligence, and promotes him.

By the end of 1926, Tom and Ruth are married and expecting a baby. Max Brinker, a German immigrant inventor who is an avowed communist, but not against getting rich, asks Tom for money to patent a machine that will greatly increase efficiency at industrial laundries. Tom invests what he can, and raises the rest from his coworkers. He negotiates a deal with Gibson to install the machine, but stipulates there can be no layoffs because of the change.

All goes well, until Mr. Gibson dies suddenly of a heart attack. The new ownership further automates Max's machine and fires three-quarters of the workforce, ignoring Tom and Gibson's deal. A mob of former employees gathers outside Tom's apartment, furious he got them to contribute money to the cause of their unemployment. Tom says they have a legal case, but they do not listen, and march on the plant to destroy the machine. Tom follows to try to stop them, and is involved in the riot when police are called. Ruth is killed while trying to find Tom, and Tom is arrested as the ringleader of the mob and sentenced to five years in prison.

Max, throwing off all pretensions of being a communist, sells his machine nationwide, making him and Tom rich. Tom has no interest in what he sees as blood money, but Max makes sure Tom gets his payments as part-owner of the patent, and, when Tom is released from prison in 1932, he has a bank balance of over fifty thousand dollars. He sees how Pa and Mary, who have been raising his son Bill, are struggling to feed the needy at their diner during the peak of the Great Depression, and signs over his bank account to them.

When a machine shop is destroyed by a mob, the Red Squad kicks Tom out of Chicago, assuming he was involved. He tramps from place to place, turned away wherever he goes, alongside many other wandering men. One night, while sheltering from the rain under a railroad trestle, Tom runs into Roger, who is in the same situation as Tom after the stock market crash exposed his and his father's misuse of depositor funds, leading to his imprisonment and his father's suicide. Whereas Roger is cynical about the future, Tom asserts that America will be stronger than ever in a few years. They are interrupted by the local authorities and forced to move on, but Tom remarks that at least the rain has stopped.

Back at Pa and Mary's diner, Tom's money is helping feed a constant stream of needy people. Mary and Bill admire a plaque honoring Tom, and Bill declares that, when he grows up, he wants to be just like his dad.

== Cast ==
- Richard Barthelmess as Tom Holmes
- Aline MacMahon as Mary Dennis
- Loretta Young as Ruth Loring Holmes
- Gordon Westcott as Roger Winston
- Robert Barrat as Max Brinker, an inventor
- Berton Churchill as Mr. Winston, Roger's father, who runs First National Bank
- Grant Mitchell as George W. Gibson, owner of South Park Laundries
- Charles Grapewin as Pa Dennis, Mary's father
- Robert McWade as Dr. Briggs, who informs Mr. Winston about Tom's morphine addiction
- George Pat Collins as the lead agitator of the laundry workers
- James Murray as the blind soldier on the boat back to America
- Edwin Maxwell as L.M., president of Consolidated Laundries
- Margaret Seddon as Jeanette Holmes, Tom's mother
- Arthur Vinton as Captain Joyce, Tom and Roger's superior officer
- Robert Elliott as a Red Squad policeman
- Lee Phelps as Ed Brady, an angry laundry worker (uncredited)
- Charles C. Wilson as a Red Squad policeman (uncredited)

== Analysis ==
The film was issued at one of the darkest points in the Depression, and its views of American society are particularly dark. Police are there to beat up demonstrators and harass people who they consider to be dangerous radicals, their squads little better than vigilante gangs. The courts mete out injustice. The bankers are crooks, the honest businessmen outweighed by those who care only for their profits, at the expense of workers. Even the comical radical at the start of the film, having come into money, becomes a Social Darwinist, caring nothing for those in need, and out only for himself. For audiences expecting a happy ending, the sudden, violent death of Tom's wife Ruth comes as a shock. While hints are given from the start that Mary is in love with Tom, and, therefore, audiences might expect they would end up together at the film's close, no such reuniting happens. Yet, unlike 1932's I Am a Fugitive from a Chain Gang, Heroes for Sale shows the shift in mood as the New Deal began. It ends, not in despair, but with an expression of hope, not just in Tom's speech, but in the picture of those in need being taken care of. Indeed, in expressing his optimism, Tom refers specifically to Franklin D. Roosevelt's inaugural address. This should not be too surprising in a Warner Bros. picture, as Warner Bros. was friendlier to the New Deal than most of the other big studios, just as its films gave far more attention to the big city milieu and members of the working class.

== Critical reception ==
Heroes for Sale received positive reviews. On the review aggregator website Rotten Tomatoes, 75% of 8 critics' reviews of the film are positive, with an average rating of 8.13/10. Ben Sachs of the Chicago Reader stated: "Wellman crams an astonishing amount of narrative incident into the short running time, with more developments every ten minutes than most contemporary Hollywood productions cover in their entirety. This is also bracingly egalitarian, attacking the hypocrisy of communists and capitalists alike."
