= The Love Flower =

1920 film by D. W. Griffith

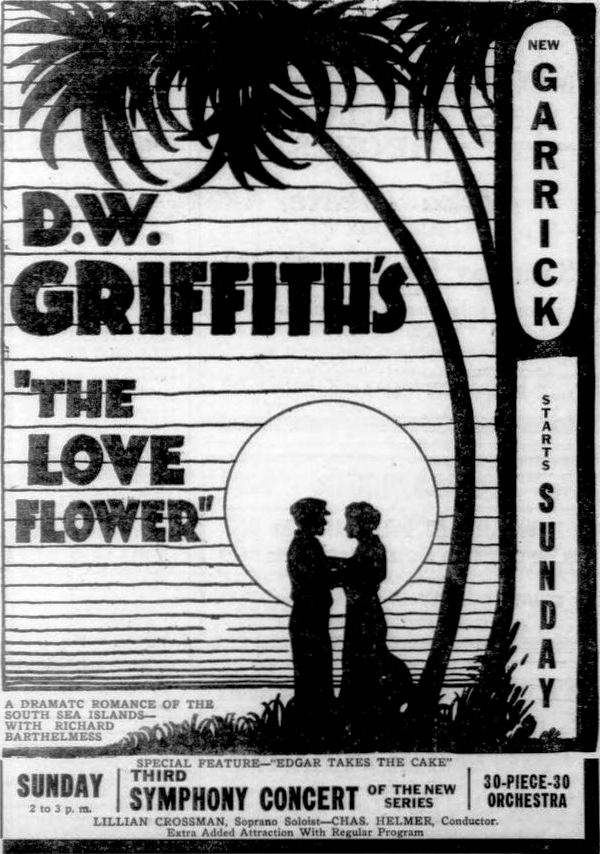
- Newspaper ad for The Love Flower
- Directed by: D. W. Griffith
- Written by: D. W. Griffith
- Based on: "Black Beach" (story) by Ralph Stock
- Produced by: D. W. Griffith
- Starring: Carol Dempster; Richard Barthelmess
- Cinematography: G. W. Bitzer; Paul H. Allen
- Edited by: James Smith
- Distributed by: United Artists
- Release dates: August 22, 1920 (New York City); September 5, 1920 (U.S.)
- Running time: 7 reels
- Country: United States
- Language: Silent (English intertitles)
- Budget: $300,000 or $91,000
- Box office: $900,000

PLAY film; runtime 01:44:07.

The Love Flower is a 1920 American silent drama film produced by D. W. Griffith and released through the then nascent United Artist company of which Griffith was a founding partner.

== Plot ==
After serving a prison sentence for a crime he did not commit, Thomas Bevan (George MacQuarrie) attempts to rebuild his life. He remarries, but his new wife (Florence Short) resents his close relationship with his daughter, Stella (Carol Dempster). When Secret Service agent Matthew Crane (Anders Randolf), the man responsible for Bevan's wrongful conviction, returns to town, tensions escalate. Bevan's wife begins an affair, and a loyal servant (Adolph Lestina) informs him shortly before a business trip. Bevan returns, confronts the situation, and during the ensuing altercation, a man is accidentally killed.

Bevan and Stella flee by motorboat, detaining Crane long enough to escape. They settle on a remote South Sea island with one servant.

While trading on a nearby island, Stella meets Bruce Sanders (Richard Barthelmess), a wealthy adventurer. Although interested in him, she suspects he may be associated with the authorities and avoids him. Puzzled, Sanders returns to the mainland and meets Crane, unaware of his intentions. He later brings Crane to the island.

Crane arrests Bevan. Believing Sanders acted deliberately, Stella sabotages the boat, stranding all four on the island. When a ship later washes ashore, Sanders destroys it to demonstrate loyalty. Stella responds by confessing her feelings for him.

Eventually, Crane's colleagues arrive. Bevan refuses to return with them. In the resulting struggle, Crane believes Bevan has drowned. Stella and Sanders depart but later return to rescue him.

== Cast ==
- Richard Barthelmess as Bruce Sanders
- Carol Dempster as Stella Bevan
- George MacQuarrie as Stella's father, Thomas Bevan
- Anders Randolf as Matthew Crane
- Florence Short as Mrs. Bevan
- Crauford Kent as her visitor
- Adolph Lestina as Bevan's old servant
- William James as Crane's assistant
- Jack Manning as Crane's assistant

== Production ==
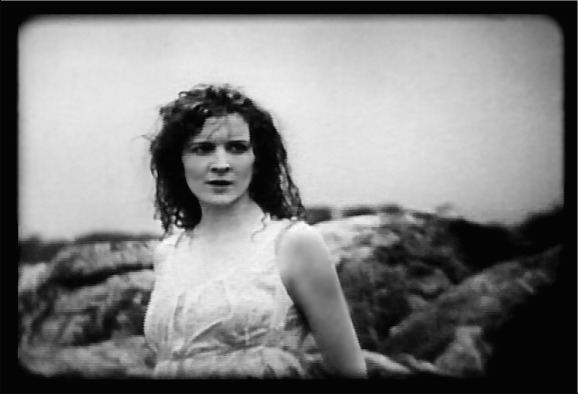
Frame showing Carol Dempster portraying Stella Bevan

Griffith filmed The Love Flower simultaneously with The Idol Dancer (1920) in Fort Lauderdale, Florida, and Nassau, Bahamas, in December 1919 to fulfill a contract with First National Pictures, but after previewing the film on April 2, 1920, before the American Newspaper Publishers Association in New York, he purchased the rights to The Love Flower for $400,000. Additional underwater footage of Dempster was shot in Florida along with scenes of her and MacQuarrie against a black background. The reedited film was then released by United Artists.
