= The Hope Chest =

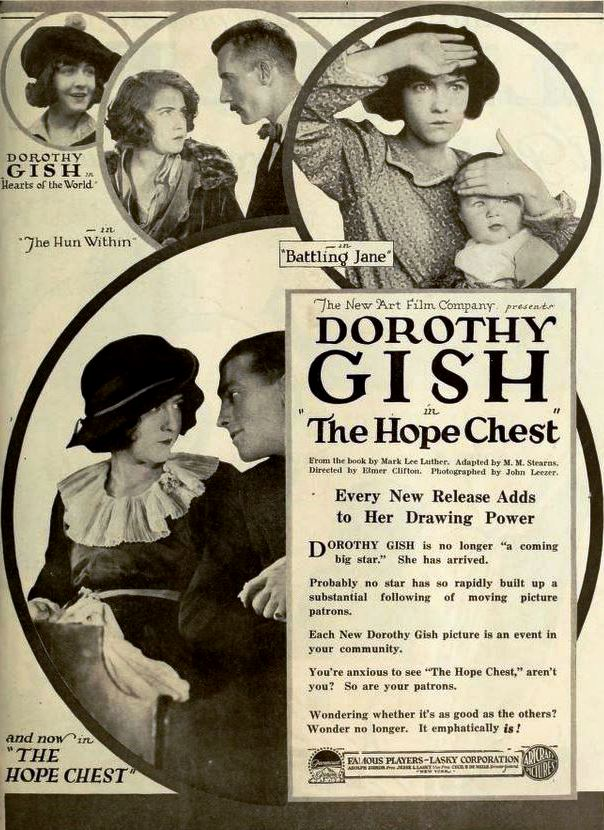
- Ad for the film
- Directed by: Elmer Clifton
- Written by: M.M. Stearns (scenario)
- Based on: The Hope Chest by Mark Lee Luther
- Starring: Dorothy Gish; George Fawcett; Richard Barthelmess; Sam De Grasse
- Cinematography: Lee Garmes; John W. Leezer
- Production company: New Art Film Company
- Distributed by: Paramount Pictures / Artcraft
- Release date: December 29, 1918
- Running time: 5 reels
- Country: United States
- Language: Silent (English intertitles)

The Hope Chest is a 1918 American silent comedy-drama film starring Dorothy Gish. The film was directed by Elmer Clifton and based on a serialized story (and later novel) by Mark Lee Luther, originally published in Woman's Home Companion. It is not known whether the film currently survives.

== Plot ==
Sheila Moore takes a job at a candy store to support her father, an out-of-work vaudevillian. She attracts the romantic attentions of the store owner's son Tom and marries him, incurring the wrath of Tom's parents.

== Cast ==
- Dorothy Gish as Sheila Moore
- George Fawcett as Lew Moore
- Richard Barthelmess as Tom Ballantyne
- Sam De Grasse as Ballantyne, Sr.
- Kate Toncray as Mrs. Ballantyne
- Carol Dempster as Ethel Hoyt
- Bertram Grassby as Stoughton Lounsbury

== Production ==
The Hope Chest was shot in Los Angeles, with production wrapping in late-September, 1918.

== Release ==
The first screenings of The Hope Chest in New Zealand appear to have been in Wellington, where it played simultaneously in two theaters in August, 1919. The film played at the Strand Theatre in Christchurch in early September, 1919.
