= Fights of Nations =

1907 comedy film

Fights of Nations is an extant 1907 American comedy film. The 16mm silent film shot in black and white is about 300 film feet and 0:08:52 long. The film includes stereotypes of various immigrant groups.

An American Mutoscope and Biograph Co. film, Gottfried Wilhelm Bitzer was the cinematographer. The sketches filmed were from vaudeville productions showing at the time and were restaged for the camera.

Biograph Bulletin no. 94 reported the film had six titles including Mexico vs. Spain" featuring the "rejected Mexican suitor, in a jealous rage, watching the love-making between Carlos, the Spaniard, his hated rival, and the beautiful senorita. With drawn stiletto, he pounces upon the Don, but the senorita seizes his arm, thus saving her lover from a horrible death. After a terrific hand-to-hand encounter, the Don has the point of vantage over the Mexican, but through the pleadings of the girl releases him and bids him go." "Our Hebrew Friends" follows with a street scene of vigorous argument "but no blows" that disrupts passerbys and comes to include a third "Hebrew" argument, a policeman who is bribed, before t"he Jew steals it back." Next is "A Scottish Combat" showing a broadsword contest "between two of America's leading actors in Scotch costumes showing how quick and accurate these deadly weapons can be handled." "Sunny Africa" is the next set piece at an Eighth Avenue piano hall in New York attended by "the colored element" who dance and cake walk before a jealous "dusky gentleman" enters convat with razors drawn and rough-housing. "Sons of the Ould Sod" depicts a "laughable scrap" between "Haggerty and Fogarty caused by the accidental dropping of a wet sheet by Mrs. Haggerty from her window upon the head of Fogarty." Beers settle the argument. Finally "America" provides the finale with patriotic decoration including the American Eagle and "harmony, peace and goodwill" among the people different nations "making it an allegorical representation of 'Peace'" with Uncle Sam "presiding at a Congress of the Powers."
