= The Girl Who Stayed at Home =

1919 film by D. W. Griffith

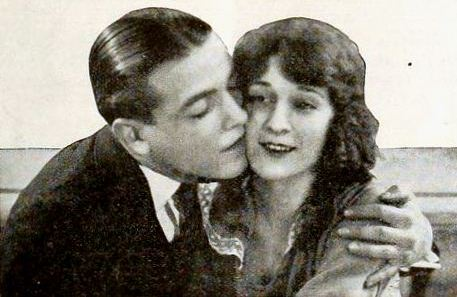
- Richard Barthelmess and Carol Dempster in the film
- Directed by: D. W. Griffith
- Written by: Stanner E. V. Taylor; D. W. Griffith
- Produced by: D. W. Griffith
- Starring: Richard Barthelmess; Carol Dempster; Clarine Seymour; Tully Marshall
- Cinematography: G. W. Bitzer
- Edited by: James Smith
- Distributed by: Paramount Pictures
- Release date: March 23, 1919 (U.S.)
- Running time: 7 reels (6,672 feet (2,034 m))
- Country: U.S.
- Language: Silent (English intertitles)

Full film

The Girl Who Stayed at Home is a 1919 American silent drama film produced and directed by D. W. Griffith and released by Paramount Pictures. Prints of the film exist.

== Plot ==
James Grey, the younger son of Edward Grey and Mrs. Grey, attempts to evade the military draft to maintain his relationship with Cutie Beautiful, a cabaret performer. His older brother, Ralph Grey, enlists and is sent to France, where his sweetheart, Blossom Le France, lives with her father, Monsieur Le France, a former Confederate officer who never surrendered and has since relocated to Europe.

James is eventually drafted and undergoes military training. During service, he is reunited with Ralph, rescuing him and his patrol from a shell hole behind enemy lines. Blossom is threatened by a German officer, who is shot by a German soldier she had previously aided.

Following the end of hostilities, the Grey brothers return home to rejoin their partners. Monsieur Le France renounces his former loyalties and swears allegiance to the American flag.

== Cast ==
- Adolph Lestina as Mr. France
- Carol Dempster as Atoline France
- Frances Parks as the chum
- Richard Barthelmess as Ralph Grey
- Robert Harron as James Grey
- Syn De Conde as Count de Brissac
- George Fawcett as Edward Grey
- Kate Bruce as Mrs. Edward Grey
- Edward Peil, Sr. as Turnverein Terror
- Clarine Seymour as Cutie Beautiful
- Tully Marshall as Cutie's old friend
- David Butler
- Joseph Scott as himself, the Honorable Joseph Scott (head of the draft exemption board)
- E. H. Crowder as himself (Provost Marshal General Enoch Crowder)
- General March as himself
