= The Avenging Conscience =

1914 American silent horror film

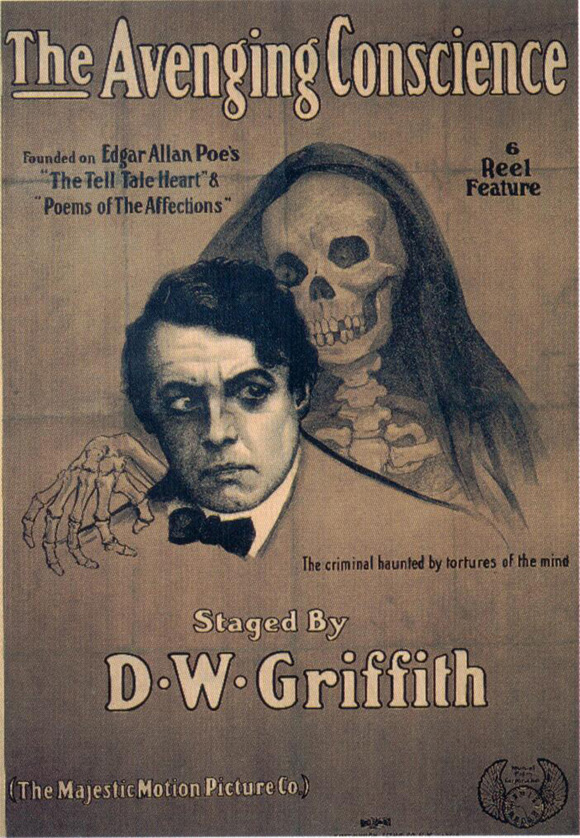
- Theatrical release poster
- Directed by: D. W. Griffith
- Written by: D. W. Griffith
- Based on: "The Tell-Tale Heart" and "Annabel Lee" by Edgar Allan Poe
- Produced by: D. W. Griffith
- Starring: Henry B. Walthall; Blanche Sweet; Spottiswoode Aitken
- Cinematography: G.W. Bitzer
- Edited by: James Smith; Rose Smith
- Music by: S. L. Rothapfel
- Production company: Majestic Motion Picture Company
- Distributed by: Mutual Film Corporation
- Release date: August 2, 1914 (U.S.)
- Running time: 78 minutes
- Country: United States
- Language: Silent (English intertitles)

Full film

The Avenging Conscience: or "Thou Shalt Not Kill" is a 1914 American silent horror film directed by D. W. Griffith. The film is based on Edgar Allan Poe's 1843 short story "The Tell-Tale Heart" and his 1849 poem "Annabel Lee". Prints of the film survive in the Museum of Modern Art film archive and in the Cohen Media Group collection.

== Plot ==
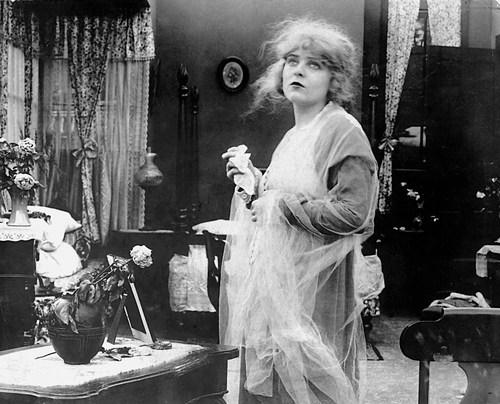
Scene from The Avenging Conscience

A young man interested in the works of Edgar Allan Poe, falls in love with a beautiful woman, but he is prevented by the uncle that raised him since childhood from pursuing her. Tormented by visions of death and suffering and deciding that murder is the way of things, the young man kills his uncle and builds a wall to hide the body.

The young man's torment continues, this time caused by guilt over murdering his uncle that was overheard by an Italian witness, and he becomes sensitive to slight noises, like the tapping of a shoe or the crying of a bird. The ghost of his uncle begins appearing to him and, as he gradually loses his grip on reality, the police figure out what he has done and chase him down. In the ending sequence, it is learned that the experience was all a dream and that his uncle is really alive. They make up, and the nephew gets to marry the sweetheart.

== Cast ==
- Henry B. Walthall as the nephew
- Blanche Sweet as his sweetheart
- Spottiswoode Aitken as the uncle
- George Siegmann as the Italian
- Ralph Lewis as the detective
- Mae Marsh as the maid
- Robert Harron as the grocery boy
- George Beranger
- Wallace Reid as the doctor

== Reception ==
Dennis Schwartz, labeling the film with a grade of B−, labeled it as a film with important historical value as "the first great American horror film."

== Trivia ==
Matt Stone, Trey Parker and two fellow students at the University of Colorado formed a production company named Avenging Conscience after watching the film together and actively disliking it. The films The Spirit of Christmas (short film) and Cannibal! The Musical were created under it's moniker. The moniker would be abandoned sometime before Stone and Parker would go on to create the animated TV series South Park.
