= The Greatest Question =

1919 film directed by D. W. Griffith

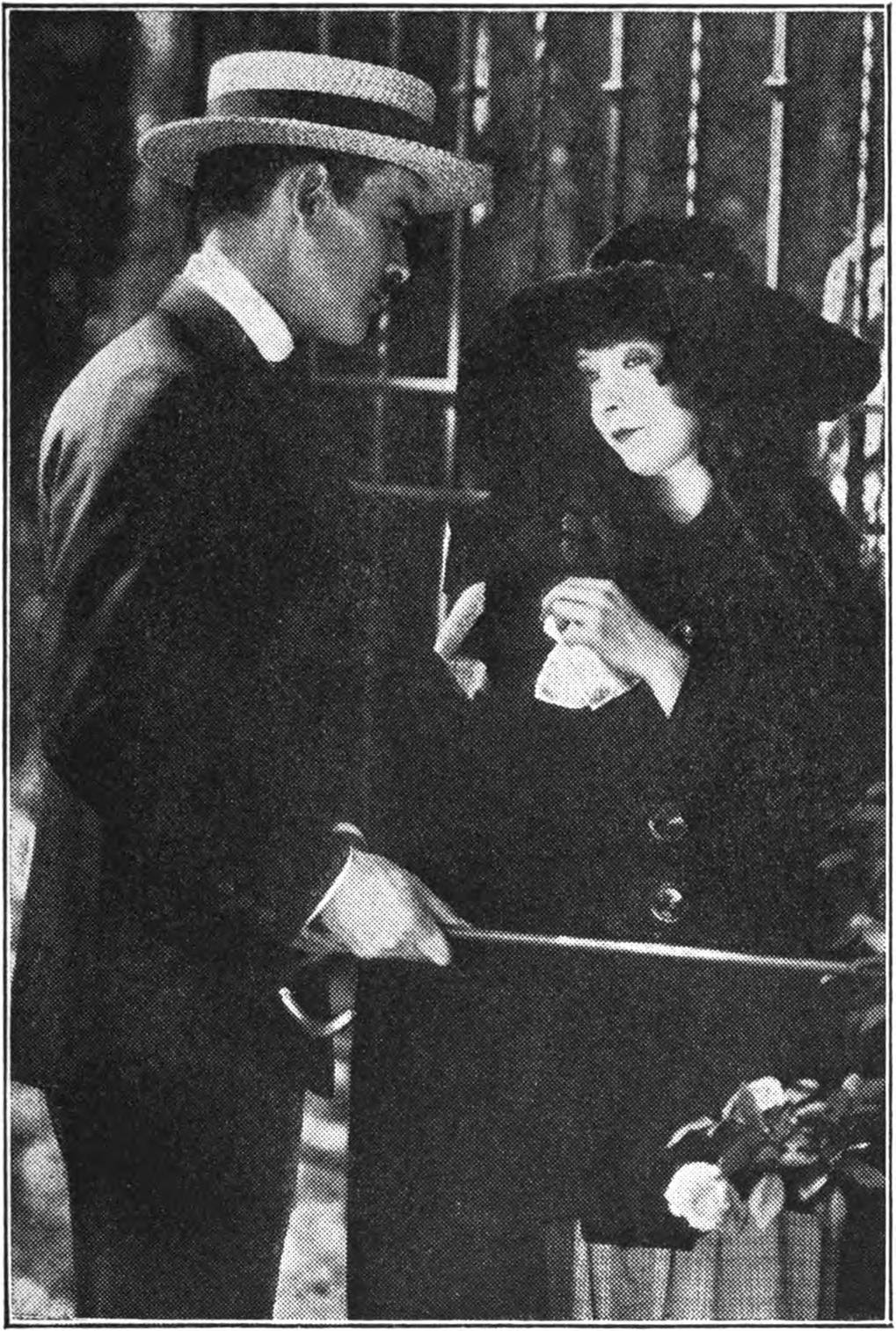
- Robert Harron and Lillian Gish
- Directed by: D. W. Griffith
- Written by: Stanner E.V. Taylor
- Based on: A novel by William Hale
- Produced by: D. W. Griffith
- Starring: Lillian Gish; Robert Harron; Ralph Graves
- Cinematography: G. W. Bitzer
- Edited by: James Smith
- Music by: Albert Pesce
- Distributed by: First National Pictures
- Release date: December 28, 1919 (U.S.)
- Running time: 80 minutes
- Country: U.S.
- Language: Silent (English intertitles)

The Greatest Question

The Greatest Question is a 1919 American drama film directed by D. W. Griffith. Based upon a novel by William Hale, the film has a plot involving spiritualism.

== Plot ==
Nellie Jarvis, the daughter of itinerant parents, witnesses the murder of an elderly woman by Mr. and Mrs. Scrubble as a child. Years later, now known as "Little Miss Yes'm," she returns to the same community as an orphan. She is taken in by the impoverished Hilton family, consisting of Mr. Hilton, Mrs. Hilton, and their son Jimmie Hilton, who becomes her sweetheart.

To support the family, Nellie finds work at a nearby farmhouse, where she is abused and mistreated. She eventually recognizes the farmer as the man involved in the murder she witnessed years earlier.

Meanwhile, Mrs. Hilton prays for relief from their hardship, appealing to the spirit of her deceased son. The following day, oil is discovered on the Hilton property. Jimmie rushes to rescue Nellie from the Scrubbles, arriving in time to prevent further harm. The oil discovery makes the Hiltons wealthy.

== Cast ==
- Lillian Gish as Nellie Jarvis
- Robert Harron as Jimmie Hilton
- Ralph Graves as John Hilton Jr.
- Eugenie Besserer as Mrs. Hilton
- George Fawcett as Mr. Hilton
- Tom Wilson as Uncle Zeke (in blackface)
- George Nichols as Martin Cain (Note: Contemporary trade coverage names the murderers Mr. and Mrs. Scrubble; the surviving print credits them as the Cains.)
- Josephine Crowell as Mrs. Cain
