= Hustling for Health =

1919 film

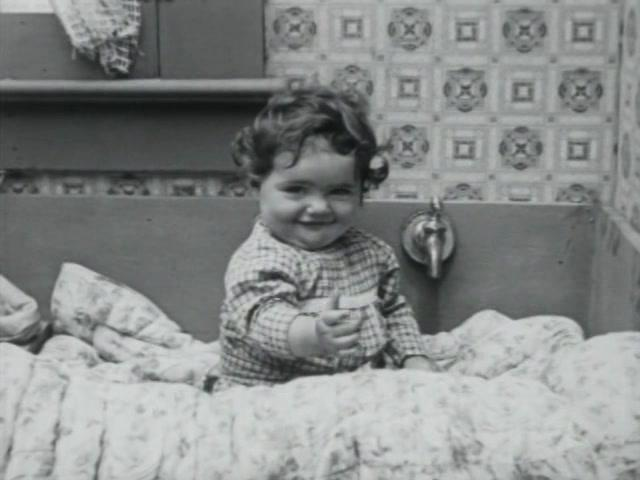
- Directed by: Frank Terry
- Produced by: Hal Roach
- Starring: Stan Laurel
- Cinematography: Robert Doran
- Edited by: Thomas J. Crizer
- Release date: February 2, 1919
- Running time: 15 minutes
- Country: United States
- Language: Silent with English intertitles

Hustling for Health is a 1919 American silent film featuring Stan Laurel.

== Plot ==
Stan is trying to get away on a holiday for his health but misses the train at Santa Fe Station. A man at the station says he can stay at his house and they shake hands on this. He gives Stan a pile of packages to carry and they board a train using Stan's ticket.

Meanwhile, a group of women in a parlour debate if husbands are "human beings or microbes".

Stan and the man arrive at the next station and hire a light buggy to take them home. Stan has to sit on the back with the bags, but after the horse bolts he is persuaded to pull the cart, being whipped by the boy driving.

As they arrive at the man's home, his neighbour Mr Spotless, tends his garden. Stan interrupts the women's meeting and they surround him, forcing him to jump out of a window to escape and warn the husband. The group of women leave and the two men enter the house. There is a chubby child in the kitchen sink, who Stan looks after while the man prepares dinner.

Next door, the local health inspector is alerted to the state of the man's garden by Mr Spotless. Stan is tasked with tidying all the junk up, but he leans over the wall causing bricks to smash Mr Spotless' cold frame. He tidies the yard by throwing things into the next door garden, before starting to hose it down.

Next door Mr Spotless finds his garden full of the rubbish. He shouts over the garden wall at Stan and gets sprayed with water. He goes next door and starts to throttle Stan, but a young woman vaults the wall and intervenes. Stan helps her back over the wall and she blows him a kiss.

Inside the man's house, his wife returns and starts to chastise him and refuses to cook dinner. Stan sees Mrs Spotless put a pie in the window to cool and steals it, along with several other dishes and takes them back to the man and his wife next door.

Mrs Spotless tells Mr Spotless of the food going missing and they call next door to enquire. The wife invites them in and they all sit at the dining table where Mrs Spotless recognises the food she had stolen. She accuses them of stealing, but Stan is given the blame and he is forced to leave.

Back out in the garden, he sees the young woman again and they flirt over the wall whilst an increasingly heavy rain shower soaks them both.

== Cast ==
- Stan Laurel as The Man
- Pearl Elmore (uncredited)
- Sadie Gordon (uncredited)
- Rosa Gore as Woman Guest (uncredited)
- Bud Jamison as Mr. Spotless (uncredited)
- Margaret Joslin as Mrs. Spotless (uncredited)
- Jerome Laplauch (uncredited)
- Belle Mitchell (uncredited)
- Marie Mosquini as Homeowner's wife (uncredited)
- James Parrott as Man misses the train (uncredited)
- Clarine Seymour as Mr. Spotless's Daughter (uncredited)
- Hazel Powell (uncredited)
- Catherine Proudfit (uncredited)
- Frank Terry as Home Owner (uncredited)
- Dorothea Wolbert as Woman Guest (uncredited)
- Noah Young as The Health Inspector (uncredited)
