= A Romance of Happy Valley =

1919 film directed by D. W. Griffith

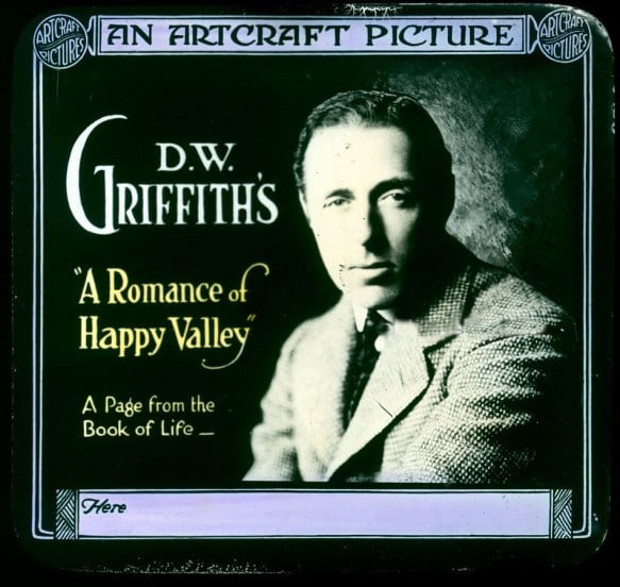
- Lantern slide
- Directed by: D. W. Griffith
- Written by: Mary Castelman; D. W. Griffith
- Produced by: D. W. Griffith
- Starring: Lillian Gish
- Cinematography: G. W. Bitzer
- Edited by: James Smith
- Distributed by: Paramount Pictures / Artcraft
- Release date: January 26, 1919 (U.S.)
- Running time: 60 minutes
- Country: U.S.
- Language: Silent (English intertitles)

Full film

A Romance of Happy Valley is a 1919 American drama film directed by D. W. Griffith and starring Lillian Gish. Believed lost for almost 50 years, a print was discovered in 1965 in the State Film Archives of the Soviet Union, which donated it to the Museum of Modern Art.

== Plot ==
In a small Southern town, John L. Logan Jr. expresses a desire to leave for New York City in search of wealth. His deeply religious parents, John L. Logan Sr. and Mrs. Logan, disapprove and attempt to change his mind through prayer and churchgoing. Encouraged by his sweetheart, Jennie Timberlake, he initially agrees to stay but ultimately departs.

Seven years later, John Jr. returns as a wealthy man. Around the same time, a wounded bank robber hides near the Logan farm. Mistaking his returning son for the fugitive, John Sr. attempts to murder and rob him. The truth emerges in time, and John Jr. survives. He reunites with Jennie, and the two are married.

== Cast ==
- Lillian Gish as Jennie Timberlake
- Robert Harron as John L. Logan Jr.
- George Fawcett as John L. Logan Sr.
- Kate Bruce as Mrs. Logan
- George Nichols as Jennie's father
- Bertram Grassby as Judas
- Porter Strong as the Negro farmhand
- Adolph Lestina as Jim Darkly
- Lydia Yeamans Titus as Old Lady Smiles
- Andrew Arbuckle as clergyman
- Frances Sparks as Topsy
- Carol Dempster as girl John Logan meets in New York

== Home media ==
A Romance of Happy Valley was released on VHS by Critics Choice Video in 1997, and was later released on Region 0 DVD-R by Alpha Video in 2015.

== See also ==
- List of rediscovered films
