= Way Down East =

1920 film directed by D. W. Griffith

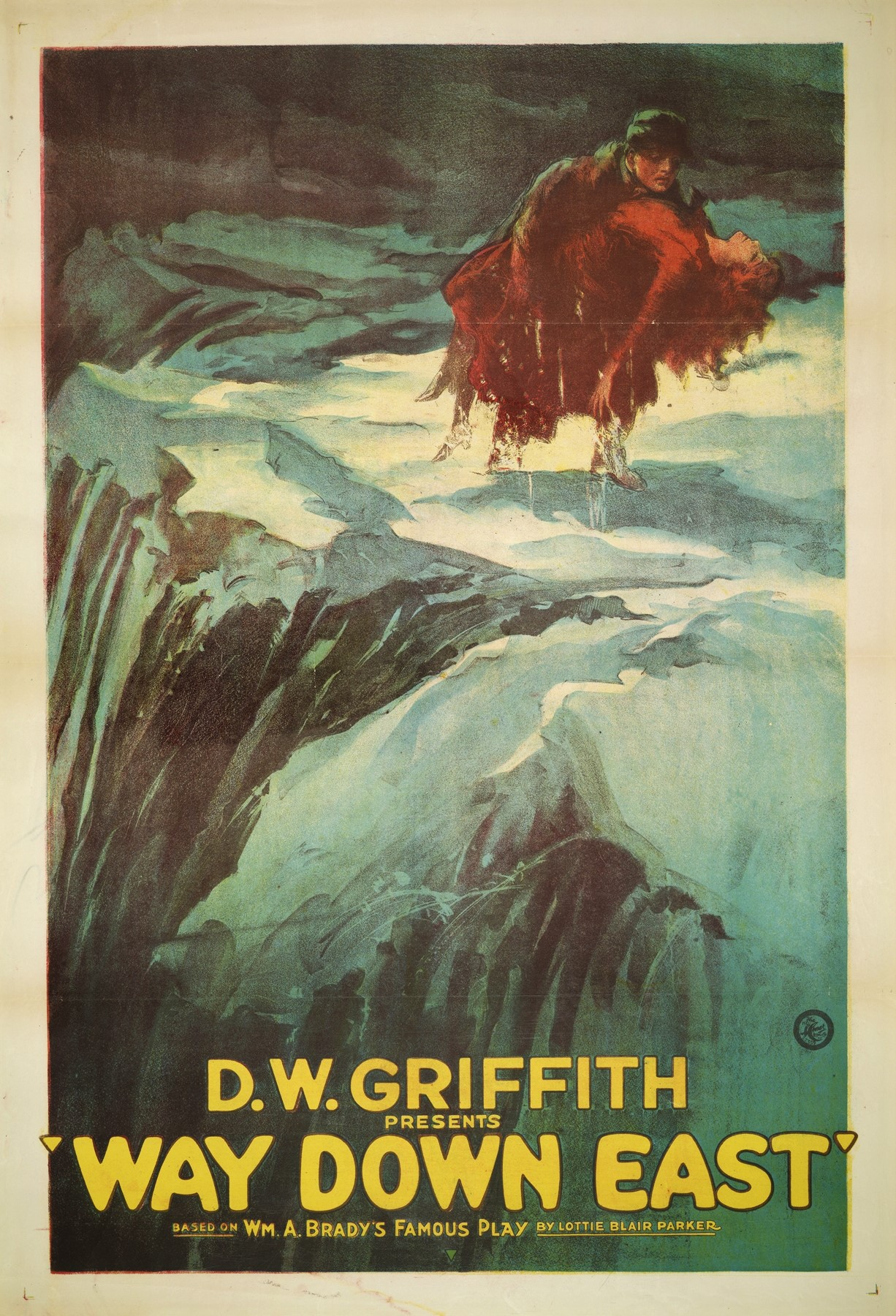
- Theatrical release poster
- Directed by: D. W. Griffith
- Written by: Anthony Paul Kelly; D. W. Griffith (uncredited); Joseph R. Grismer (adaptation)
- Based on: Way Down East by Lottie Blair Parker
- Produced by: D. W. Griffith (uncredited)
- Starring: Lillian Gish; Richard Barthelmess; Lowell Sherman; Burr McIntosh
- Cinematography: G.W. Bitzer
- Edited by: James Smith; Rose Smith
- Music by: Louis Silvers; William Frederick Peters
- Distributed by: United Artists
- Release date: September 3, 1920
- Running time: 148 minutes
- Country: United States
- Language: Silent (English intertitles)
- Budget: $800,000 or $635,000
- Box office: $7,500,000

PLAY full film; runtime 02:27:58

Way Down East is a 1920 American silent melodrama film directed by D. W. Griffith and starring Lillian Gish. It is one of four film adaptations of the 19th century play of the same name by Lottie Blair Parker. There were two earlier silent versions and one sound version in 1935 starring Henry Fonda. Griffith's version is particularly remembered for its climax in which Gish's character is rescued from doom on an icy river.

== Plot ==
Anna is a poor country girl who is tricked by handsome man-about-town Lennox into a fake wedding. When she becomes pregnant, he reveals the truth of their relationship and leaves her. She has the baby, named Trust Lennox, on her own in a boarding house.

When the baby dies she wanders until she gets a job with Squire Bartlett. Despite being unofficially engaged, David, Squire Bartlett's son, falls for her, but she rejects him due to her torrid past. Lennox then shows up as an old friend of the Bartletts, and lusting for another local girl, Kate. Seeing Anna, he tries to get her to leave, but she refuses to go claiming she never did anything wrong, although she promises to say nothing about their history.

Finally, the woman running the boardinghouse while visiting the Bartletts recognizes Anna. Squire Bartlett eventually learns of Anna's past from Martha, the town gossip. In his anger, he tosses Anna out into a snow storm. She agrees to go, but not before naming the respected Lennox as her despoiler and the father of her dead baby. She becomes lost in the raging storm while David leads a search party. The unconscious Anna floats on an ice floe down a river towards a waterfall, until rescued at the last moment by David, who then marries her.

== Cast ==
- Lillian Gish as Anna Moore
- Richard Barthelmess as David Bartlett
- Lowell Sherman as Lennox Sanderson
- Burr McIntosh as Squire Bartlett
- Kate Bruce as Mother Bartlett
- Mary Hay as Kate, Squire's Niece
- Creighton Hale as The Professor
- Emily Fitzroy as Maria Poole, Landlady
- Porter Strong as Seth Holcomb
- Edgar Nelson as "Hi" Holler
- Mrs. Morgan Belmont as Diana Tremont
- Vivia Ogden as Martha Perkins
- George Neville as The Constable

== Production ==
Actor Lillian Gish, referring to the famous "chase sequence on the ice-floes," quipped: "All that winter, whenever Mr. Griffith saw an ice cake, he wasn't satisfied till he had me on it." (Note: O'Dell may be quoting from Gish's 1969 memoir "The Movies, Mr. Griffith, and Me" See O'Dell p. 158 Bibliography note no. 19)

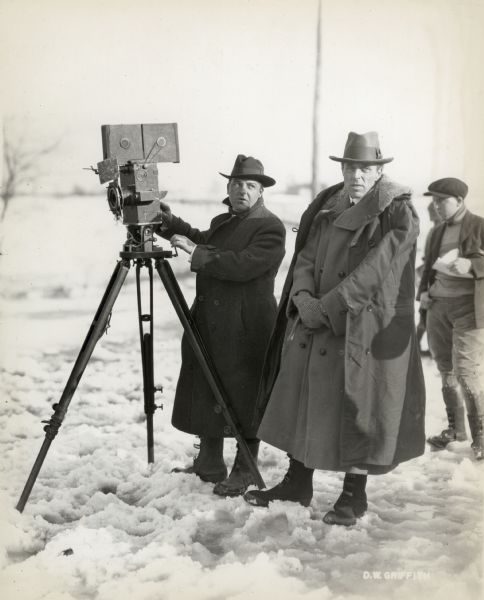
Billy Bitzer (behind Pathé camera) with Griffith on location

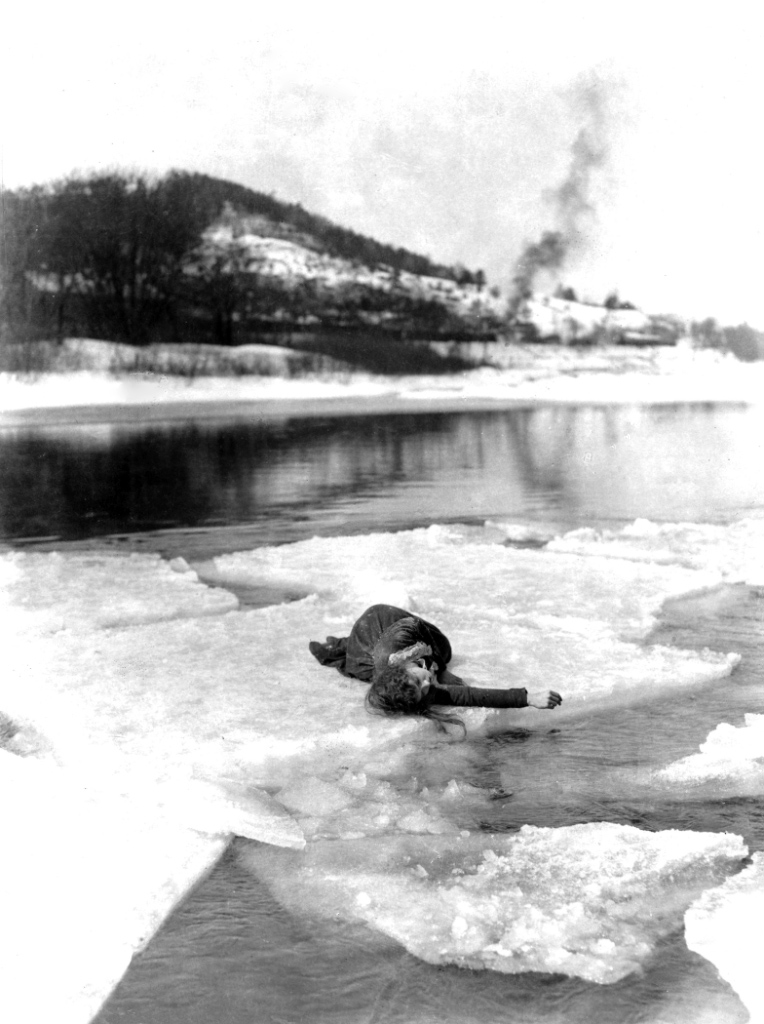
Gish in famous ice-floe scene

D. W. Griffith bought the film rights to the story, originally a stage play by Lottie Blair Parker that was elaborated by Joseph R. Grismer. Grismer's wife, the Welsh actress Phoebe Davies, became identified with the play beginning in 1897 and starred in over 4,000 performances of it by 1909, making it one of the most popular plays in the United States. Davies died in 1912, having toured the play for well over ten years. The play, an old-fashioned story that espoused nineteenth-century American and Victorian ideals, was considered outdated by the time of its cinematic production in 1920.

The story rights were purchased for $175,000.

Some sources, quoting newspaper ads of the time, say a sequence was filmed in an early color process, possibly Technicolor or Prizmacolor.

Clarine Seymour, who had appeared in four previous Griffith films, was originally cast in the role of Squire Bartlett's niece, Kate. After Seymour's untimely death, Mary Hay was cast and Seymour's scenes were reshot.

The famous ice-floe sequence was filmed in White River Junction, Vermont. An actual waterfall was used, though it was only a few feet high; the long shot where a large drop is shown was filmed at Niagara Falls. The ice needed to be sawed or dynamited before filming could be done. During filming, a small fire had to be kept burning beneath the camera to keep the oil from freezing. At one point, Griffith was frostbitten on one side of his face. No stunt doubles were used at the time, so Gish and Barthelmess performed the stunts themselves. Gish's hair froze, and she lost feeling in her hand from the cold. It was her idea to put her hand and hair in the water. Her right hand would be somewhat impaired for the remainder of her life. The shot where the ice floes are filmed going over the waterfall was filmed out of season, so those ice floes are actually wooden. Cinematographically, the ice floe scene is an early example of parallel action.

== Censorship ==
Similar to other Griffith productions, Way Down East was subjected to censorship by some American state film censor boards. For example, the Pennsylvania film board required over 60 cuts in the film, removing the mock marriage and honeymoon between Lennox and Anna as well as any hints of her pregnancy, effectively destroying the film's integral conflict. The resulting film may have surprised viewers in that state when a child suddenly appears shortly before its death. Other cuts removed scenes where society women smoke cigarettes and an intertitle with the euphemism "wild oats."

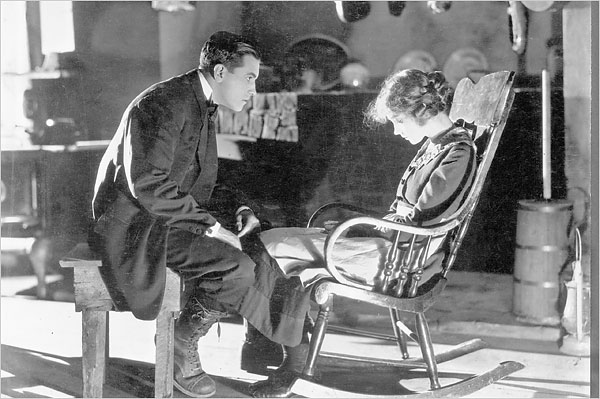
Scene with Barthelmess and Gish

== Reception ==
=== Box office ===
Although it was Griffith's most expensive film to date, it was also one of his most commercially successful. Way Down East is the fourth-highest grossing silent film in cinema history, taking in more than $4.5 million at the box office in 1920. The picture was "second only to his Birth of a Nation (1915) as a money-maker." (Note: Quote is from Elleen Bowser in D. W. Griffith American Film Master, 1965 see footnote no. 2, O'Dell Bibliography, p. 157)

It played as a roadshow, then earned $2 million as a normal release.

The film earned $1 million in profit.

=== Retrospective assessments of the film ===
After viewing the drama at a public screening in 1994, film critic Mark Adamo of The Washington Post was especially impressed with Gish's performance and with Griffith's highly innovative "cinematic style":

What's astounding about the film is not that the rickety conventions of 1890s stage melodrama dog its every frame. (Even the film's seeming pioneering of feminism is hoary: the Leviticus-style titles would have us believe that Lillian Gish's tremulous ingenue fallen prey to a heavily mascaraed roue is "the story of Woman.") What's amazing is that so much of Gish's tough, funny, intuitive performance, particularly in the film's middle section as she bears her illegitimate child, transcends time, place and technology. Equally amazing is Griffith's mighty striving, with his arty location shots, quirky close-ups and riskily staged set pieces, to forge a new and expressly cinematic style.

"Way Down East was the most passionate of Griffish's many paeans of praise for the Christian home; on this score, at least, he could have satisfied Harriet Beecher Stowe." — Literary and film critic Edward Wagenknecht. (Note: Stowe, author of Uncle Tom's Cabin (1852) was an abolitionist and publicly condemned slavery.)

Later, in 2007, in his comparison of this production to other works by Griffith, film reviewer Paul Brenner judged it to be one of the director's better, less "preachy" screen presentations:

Many of Griffith's features suffer from sententious moralizing, a sense of God speaking to the masses, and outright racism. But Way Down East highlights the greatness of Griffith without having to sit through the Sermon on the Mount or the Ride of The Klan. In Way Down East, Griffith's psychotic nuttiness, for once, didn't get in the way of a good film.

== Way Down East on National Radio ==
"Way Down East" left the theatre stage and movie screen for the radio microphone for the first time on November 25, 1935 on "The Lux Radio Theatre" over the CBS radio network. The host for the one-hour presentation was none other than Cecil B. De Mille, who had nothing to do with Griffith's famous film. Both Richard Barthelmess and Lillian Gish, stars of the 1920 film, performed on the "Lux" program. The featured players on the Mutual programs were Agnes Moorehead and Van Heflin, who both later had significant film careers of their own. Ned Wever, later famous as "Boston Blackie," portrayed the evil Lennox Sanderson. None of the actors in the 1920 film appeared on the Mutual net radio serialization.

Each broadcast began, "Now, Way Down East. We bring you the sequel, as written by us, to the great stage and screen melodrama, Way Down East, the play that has thrilled millions." Those few words, part of the program's introduction ("the sequel, as written by us") played an important part in this story's radio history. The basic plot and characters were similar to the hit play by Lottie Blair Parker; who had licensed it to D.W. Griffith for the 1920 film. The story was re-filmed in 1935 (as a "talking" film:) and twice more in later years. A week after the CBS "Lux" broadcast, on December 2, 1935, "Way Down East" began as a radio serial on the Mutual network. WOR (Newark) originated the shows; which were simultaneously broadcast by WLW in Cincinnati. WLW was the most powerful broadcast station in the United States at that time. Calling itself, "The Nation's Station," it could actually be heard from New York to Los Angeles, with the power of 500,000 watts. The serial ended on May 29,1936 after 130 episodes, heard five days per week. Mutual ran the serialized story a second time, starting on September 14, 1936. Fully sponsored and with large audiences, the program was expanded to 195 episodes. WLW, did not run the program a second time. Other radio stations joined WOR for the re-run The second time, the story ran until Jun 11, 1937. However, WFIL (Philadelphia) ended the program after 71 episodes, KWK (St. Louis) ended the serial after 80 episodes. The other stations carried all 195 episodes: WNAC (Boston), WCAE (Pittsburgh), WHK (Cleveland), WJR (Detroit), WGN (Chicago), WHO (Des Moines), WDAF (Kansas City), WSAI (Cincinnati), KSTP (Minneapolis), WTIC (Hartford) and WFBM (Indianapolis) and WGR (Buffalo).

On September 8, 1937, just one week before the second run was starting, WOR, Mutual and the sponsors were sued in New York's Superior Court by a Mr. William A. Brady who claimed to have purchased the rights to the story from the author of the play (Lottie Blair Parker). William Brady demanded that WOR-Mutual "cease-and-desist" the planned re-run of the programs and to surrender all profits made to date to himself. Mr. Brady waited until all 130 episodes had been broadcast until claiming all the profits. And so began a lawsuit that was filed 1 1/2 years after the series first began. After a lengthy trial before Judge Duane Jones of New York's Superior Court (no jury), the verdict came down against the plaintiff, in favor of WOR-Mutual. It was ruled that just because Mr. Brady purchased the film and stage rights, Mutual could and did obtain the legal right to dramatize the story on radio. $750 was paid to the playwright, Lottie Blair Parker. Mr. Brady was the producer of the movie and had also received credit as one of the writers on D. W. Griffith's famous film, but gained no financial reward from, "Way Down East" on radio. A transcript of the trial made assigning broadcast dates to each episode possible.

Those four words ("as written by us") which were said at the start of every program, were of some significance. The characters, story and settings of film and radio shows were the same (or similar). The Mutual described the show as a "sequel," and not the original. World Transcriptions matrix #BB12830C1 et al were assigned to the discs when pressings were made. The claims and lawsuits from people like William Brady would continue for other radio properties, far into the future. Blackett-Sample-Hummert was the advertising agency that brought together the sponsors and the network. The commercials were for products of The Sterling Pharmaceuticals Company and/or The Charles H. Phillips Chemical Company (most likely, "Haley's M-O" and "Phillips Milk of Magnesia"). Frank Hummert, who produced the radio serial for Mutual, would soon become (with his wife, Anne), the most powerful force in daytime radio soap operas. A logical assumption about the second run of "Way Down East" would be that the programs were recorded during the first run series and played back for the second run series. Since only 13 stations ran the second series, the 16" disks on which the programs were recorded, were likely pressed in small quantities. There's no evidence that this method of disc syndication was used. It's possible (but unlikely) that both series were broadcast live. Mutual had no qualms about using recordings on the air, as did NBC at this time. Therefore, it may have been that the transcriptions were made before any broadcasts began, and that the first and second runs were both played back from the discs and not broadcast live. No evidence, either way, and yet been discovered. The discs were pressed by the World Transcription Company which used the now obsolete "Vertical" method, which today is used to provide one channel of "stereophonic" records. Other stations ran various numbers of the 195 episodes; one ran as few as 71 episodes (WFIL, Philadelphia). How WFIL ended the continuing story before episode #195 is not known. Perhaps they just ended the serial in mid-catastrophe. The transcriptions were discovered in 1960 by Les Zeiger of New York City, preserved on tape by J. David Goldin in 1961, and donated by him to the Library of Congress in 1976. Annotated descriptions of the episodes are available at the Miller-Nichols Library of the University of Missouri (Kansas City) and on-line at Radiogoldindex.com.

== See also ==
- List of early color feature films

== Sources ==
- Wagenknecht, Edward (1962). The Movies in the Age of Innocence. Norman, Oklahoma: University of Oklahoma Press. OCLC 305160.
