= America (1924 film) =

1924 film by D. W. Griffith

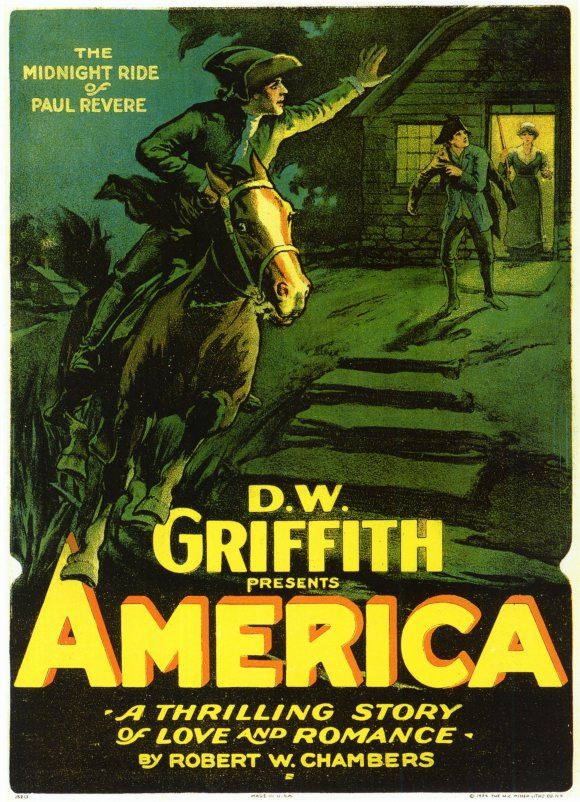
- Directed by: D. W. Griffith
- Written by: Robert W. Chambers
- Produced by: D. W. Griffith
- Starring: Carol Dempster; Neil Hamilton; Lionel Barrymore
- Cinematography: George Bitzer; Marcel Le Picard; Hendrik Sartov; Harold S. Sintzenich
- Edited by: James Smith; Rose Smith
- Music by: Joseph Carl Breil; Adolph Fink
- Production company: D. W. Griffith Productions
- Distributed by: United Artists
- Release date: February 21, 1924
- Running time: 141 minutes
- Country: United States
- Language: Silent (English intertitles)
- Budget: $795,000
- Box office: $1,750,000

The full film

America, also called Love and Sacrifice, is a 1924 American silent historical war romance film. It describes the heroic story of the events during the American Revolutionary War, in which filmmaker D. W. Griffith created a film adaptation of Robert W. Chambers' 1905 novel The Reckoning. The plot mainly centers on the Northern theatre of the war in New York, with romance spliced into individual movie scenes.

== Plot ==
The story shifts between the viewpoints of Loyalists in Upstate New York and Patriots in Massachusetts and Virginia. Later in the film, in New York, a little-remembered sub-plot takes place. Captain Walter Butler, a ruthless Loyalist officer, leads the Iroquois in viciously barraging attacks against American settlers, including the massacre of women and children who are siding with the Patriots.

In Lexington, Massachusetts, Nathan Holden works as an express rider and minuteman for the Boston Committee of Public Safety. At a mission to deliver a dispatch to the Virginia General Assembly, he meets Nancy Montague and falls in love with her, but her father, Justice Montague, a Loyalist judge, is not impressed with the rider. Captain Butler tries unsuccessfully to court Nancy. Nathan and Nancy declare that regardless of which side he fights for, they will always love each other. While visiting in Massachusetts, Justice Montague is accidentally shot by Nathan Holden. Nancy Montague's brother, Charles Montague, is influenced by George Washington's heroism and decides that he wants to support the colonists. However, he dies shortly after being wounded at the Battle of Bunker Hill. Nancy hides the truth from her father when she tells him that her brother died fighting for the Crown.

Nancy and her father travel to Mohawk Valley, New York, to the home of her uncle Ashleigh Montague while Holden visits George Washington at Valley Forge. He gets sent to New York with Morgan's raiders to settle down the Native American attacks up north. Butler occupies the Montague estate. His men kill Montague's brother and he arrests Montague and takes Nancy prisoner. Holden arrives to spy on Butler and overhears his plans for a massacre attack. He leaves to sound the alarm, reluctantly leaving Nancy behind with Butler. Butler plans to force himself on Nancy, but the Native Americans decide to attack immediately and Butler is compelled to join them. Nancy escapes when Butler leaves for the battle, and she and Montague reach the fort safely before the attack. The attackers mount ruthless attack on the fort, ultimately breaching the walls and killing many settlers. The Morgan's raiders arrive and liberate the fort, saving the lives of Montague and Nancy. A separate group of militia and Native Americans chase down and kill Butler, putting a stop to his plan. Montague believes in Holden's worth, and allows him and Nancy to be together. The film concludes with the surrender of Lord Cornwallis at the Siege of Yorktown in 1781 and the first inauguration of George Washington as president of the United States in 1789.

== Cast ==
- Neil Hamilton as Nathan Holden
- Erville Alderson as Justice Montague
- Carol Dempster as Miss Nancy Montague
- Charles Emmett Mack as Justice Charles Montague
- Lee Beggs as Samuel Adams
- John Dunton as John Hancock
- Arthur Donaldson as King George III
- Charles Bennett as William Pitt
- Downing Clarke as Lord Chamberlain
- Frank Walsh as Thomas Jefferson
- Frank McGlynn Sr. as Patrick Henry
- Arthur Dewey as George Washington
- P. R. Scammon as Richard Henry Lee
- Lionel Barrymore as Capt. Walter Butler
- Sydney Deane as Sir Ashley Montague
- Harry O'Neill as Paul Revere
- Louis Wolheim as Capt. Peter Hare
- Riley Hatch as Joseph Brant
- Paul Doucet as Marquis de Lafayette
- Emil Hoch as Lord North

== Production ==
In 1923, the Daughters of the American Revolution petitioned Motion Picture Production Association President Will H. Hays to make a historical epic about the American Revolution, and Hays convinced D.W. Griffith to direct the film. Griffith prepared for the film by visiting historic battlefields and meeting with historical societies such as the DAR, the Sons of the Revolution, the Smithsonian Institution, the New York Public Library, the Lexington Historical Society, the Mount Vernon Ladies' Association, and the Massachusetts Historical Society.

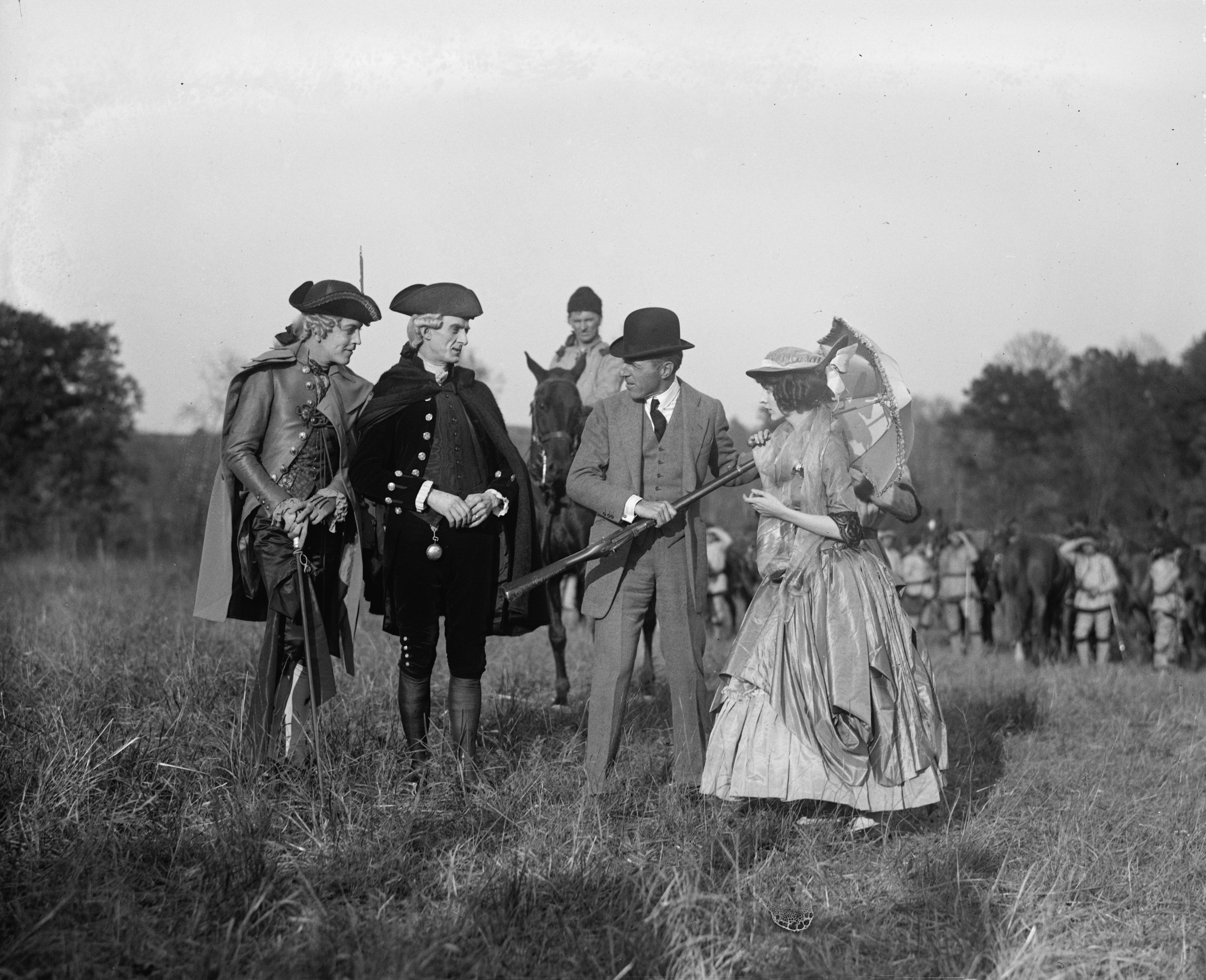
D. W. Griffith (holding rifle) during filming

=== Casting ===
Griffith used many popular movie actors at the time, but he felt that there was no need for them to play the roles in his films, and could not afford most of them anyway, after they began to consume nearly all of his money in expensive productions. As a result, Lillian Gish, who acted in a well known film of his, Orphans of the Storm, departed after he could not pay any more for her services and left him with Carol Dempster. Additionally United States Armed Forces personnel were used as extras.

=== Filming ===
Filming took place at Richmond, Virginia and Somers, New York. During the filming of a recreation of the Battle of Bunker Hill at Somers, a 19-year-old soldier's arm was blown off while reloading a cannon. As Charles Emmett Mack recalled, "Neil Hamilton and I went to neighboring towns and raised a fund for him—I doing a song and dance and Neil collecting a coin."

== Reception ==
=== Box office ===
The film was screened to President Calvin Coolidge before its release, and the United States Army used it for recruitment purposes. However, America did not receive as large an audience as Griffith's previous films did. Its relative failure was in spite of Griffith's spending over a million dollars on the production.

=== Criticism ===
Film critics described the motion picture as lacking in modernity of the time. The movie was unlike the other films of the time, at its original release. The usage of title captions was criticized.

The film was not completely useless to Griffith, but he was still in debt with massive amounts of money and did not receive that boost of attention he was hoping for.

== See also ==
- The Reckoning (1908)
- The Heart of a Hero (1916)
- Cardigan (1922)
- List of films about the American Revolution
- List of television series and miniseries about the American Revolution
