= Richard Barthelmess =

American actor (1895–1963)

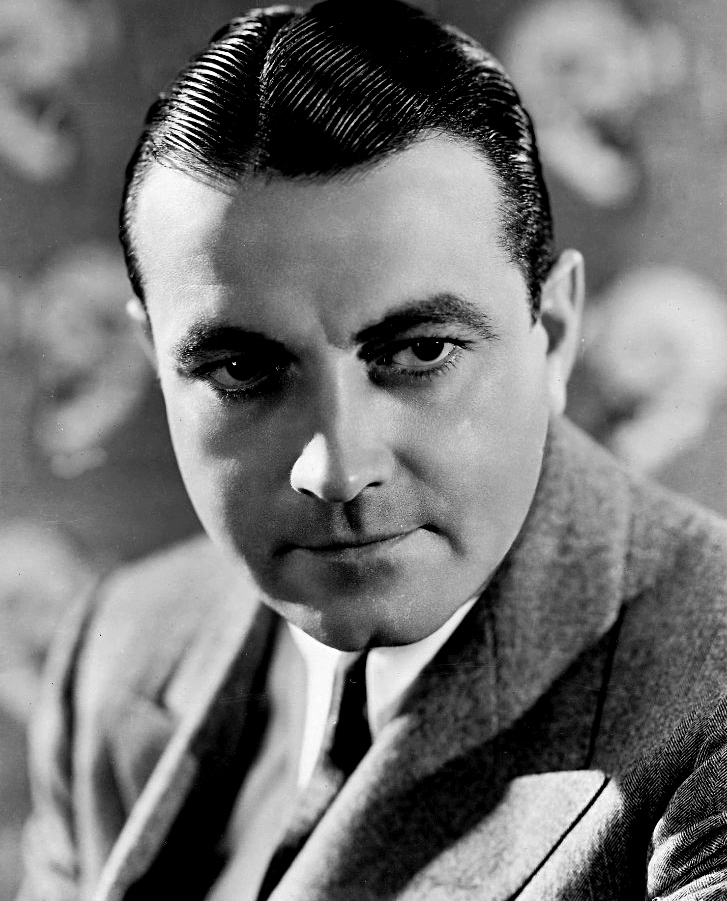
- Barthelmess in 1934
- Born: May 9, 1895; New York City, U.S.
- Died: August 17, 1963 (aged 68); Southampton, New York, U.S.
- Resting place: Ferncliff Cemetery
- Education: Trinity College
- Occupation: Actor
- Years active: 1916–1942
- Spouses: Mary Hay (m. 1920; div. 1927) Jessica Stewart Sargent (m. 1928)
- Children: 2

Richard Semler Barthelmess (May 9, 1895 – August 17, 1963) was an American film actor, principally of the Hollywood silent era. He starred opposite Lillian Gish in D. W. Griffith's Broken Blossoms (1919) and Way Down East (1920) and was among the founders of the Academy of Motion Picture Arts and Sciences in 1927. Two years later he was nominated for the Academy Award for Best Actor for two films: The Patent Leather Kid and The Noose.

== Early life ==
Barthelmess was born in New York City, the son of Caroline W. Harris, a stage actress, and Alfred W. Barthelmess. His father died when he was a year old. Through his mother, he grew up in the theatre, doing "walk-ons" from an early age. In contrast to that, he was educated at Hudson River Military Academy at Nyack, New York and Trinity College at Hartford, Connecticut. He did some acting in college and other amateur productions. By 1919 he had five years in stock company experience.

== Career ==
Russian actress Alla Nazimova, a friend of the family, was taught English by Caroline Barthelmess. Nazimova convinced Richard Barthelmess to try acting professionally, and he made his debut screen appearance in 1916 in the serial Gloria's Romance as an uncredited extra. He also appeared as a supporting player in several films starring Marguerite Clark.

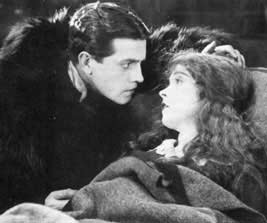
With Lillian Gish in the 1920 release Way Down East

His next role, in War Brides opposite Nazimova, attracted the attention of director D.W. Griffith, who offered him several important roles, finally casting him opposite Lillian Gish in Broken Blossoms (1919) and Way Down East (1920). He founded his own production company, Inspiration Film Company, together with Charles Duell and Henry King. One of their films, Tol'able David (1921), in which Barthelmess starred as a teenage mailman who finds courage, was a major success. In 1922, Photoplay described him as the "idol of every girl in America."

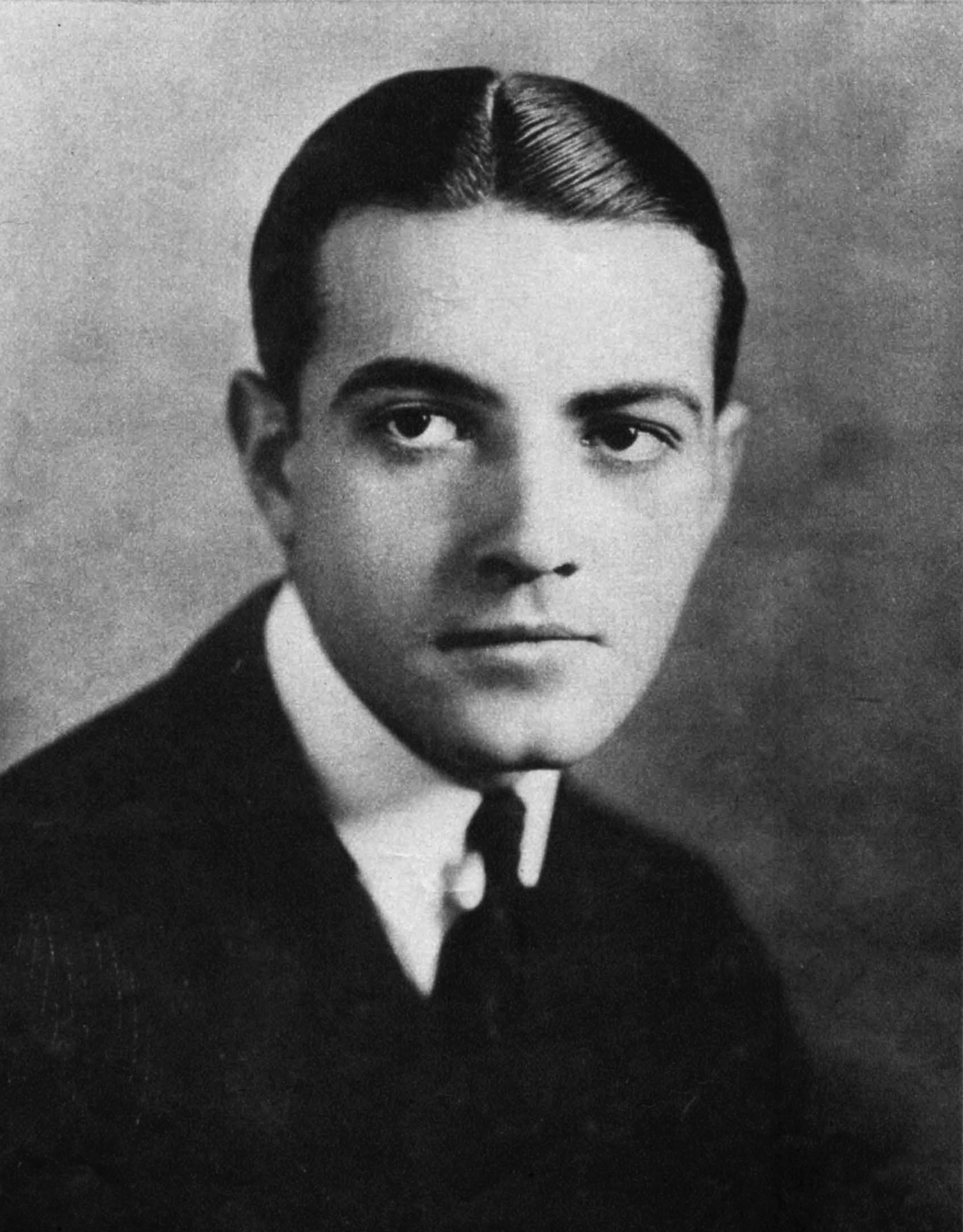
Silverscreen magazine, 1922

Barthelmess had a large female following during the 1920s. An admirer wrote to the editor of Picture-Play Magazine in 1921:

Different fans have different opinions, and although Wallace Reid, Thomas Meighan, and Niles Welch are mighty fine chaps, I think that Richard Barthelmess beats them all. Dick is getting more and more popular every day, and why? Because his wonderful black hair and soulful eyes are enough to make any young girl adore him. The first play I saw Dick in was Boots—Dorothy Gish playing the lead. This play impressed me so that I went to see every play in which he appeared—Three Men and a Girl, Scarlet Days, The Love Flower, and Broken Blossoms, in which I decided that Dick was my favorite. I am looking forward to Way Down East as being a great success, because I know Dick will play a good part.

Barthelmess soon became one of Hollywood's higher paid performers, starring in such classics as The Patent Leather Kid in 1927 and The Noose in 1928; he was nominated for Best Actor at the first Academy Awards for his performance in both films. In addition, he won a special citation for producing The Patent Leather Kid.

With the advent of the sound era, Barthelmess remained a star for a number of years. He played numerous leads in talkie films, most notably Son of the Gods (1930), The Dawn Patrol (1930), The Last Flight (1931), The Cabin in the Cotton (1932) and Heroes for Sale (1933). He was able to choose his own material and often played in controversial or socially conscious films. However, his popularity began to wane in the 1930s. He became too old for the boyish leads he usually played. In his later films (between 1939 and his retirement in 1942), he turned towards character roles – most notably, his supporting role as the disgraced pilot and husband of Rita Hayworth's character in Only Angels Have Wings (1939).

=== Post-acting career ===
Barthelmess failed to maintain the stardom of his silent film days and gradually left entertainment. He enlisted in the United States Navy Reserve during World War II, and served as a lieutenant commander, stationed at Pearl Harbor Naval Shipyard. He never returned to film, preferring to live off his real estate investments.

== Personal life ==
On June 18, 1920, Barthelmess married Mary Hay, a stage and screen star, in New York. They had one daughter, Mary Barthelmess, before divorcing on January 15, 1927.

In August 1927, Barthelmess became engaged to Katherine Young Wilson, a Broadway actress. However, the engagement was called off due to Wilson's stated desire to continue acting, or possibly his affair around this time with the journalist Adela Rogers St. Johns.

On April 21, 1928, Barthelmess married Jessica Stewart Sargent. He later adopted her son, Stewart, from a previous marriage. They remained married until Barthelmess' death in 1963.

== Death ==
Barthelmess died of throat cancer on August 17, 1963, aged 68, in Southampton, New York. He was interred at the Ferncliff Cemetery and Mausoleum in Hartsdale, New York.

== Legacy ==
- Barthelmess was a founder of the Academy of Motion Picture Arts and Sciences.
- In 1960, Barthelmess received a motion picture star on the Hollywood Walk of Fame at 6755 Hollywood Boulevard for his contributions to the film industry.
- Barthelmess was among the second group of recipients of the George Eastman Award in 1957, given by the George Eastman House for distinguished contribution to the art of film.
- Composer Katherine Allan Lively dedicated her piano composition Within the Walls of China: A Chinese Episode to Barthelmess in the sheet music published in 1923 by G. Schirmer, Inc. An article in The Music Trades reported that Mrs. Lively was inspired by a viewing of the film Broken Blossoms, and performed the piece for Barthelmess and his friends in New York in the summer of 1922.
- In 2024, East West Players produced Unbroken Blossoms by Philip W. Chung, a world premier play which depicted the making of Broken Blossoms. Barthelmess was portrayed by actor Conlan Ledwith.

== Filmography ==
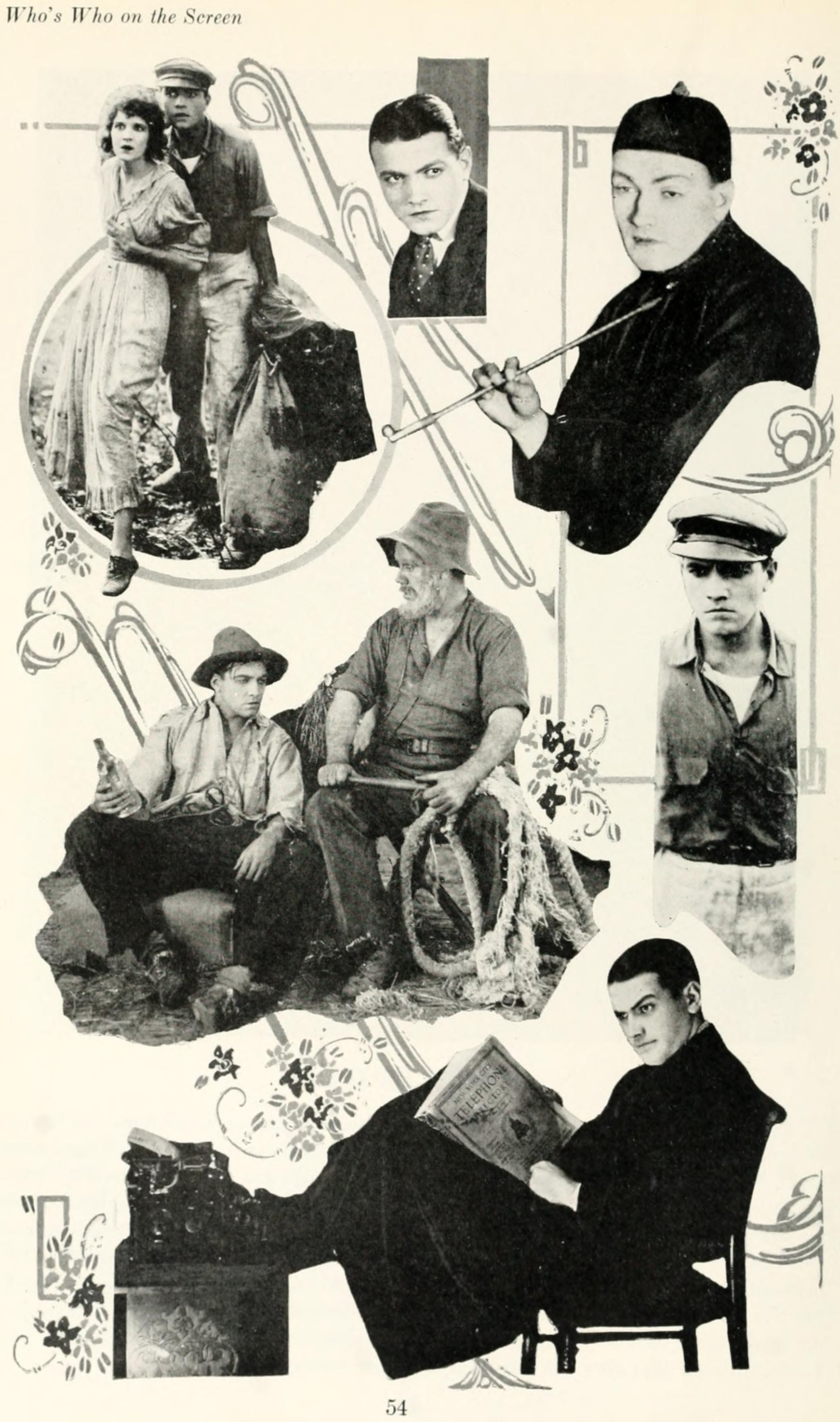
Collage of various characters portrayed by Barthelmess, 1920

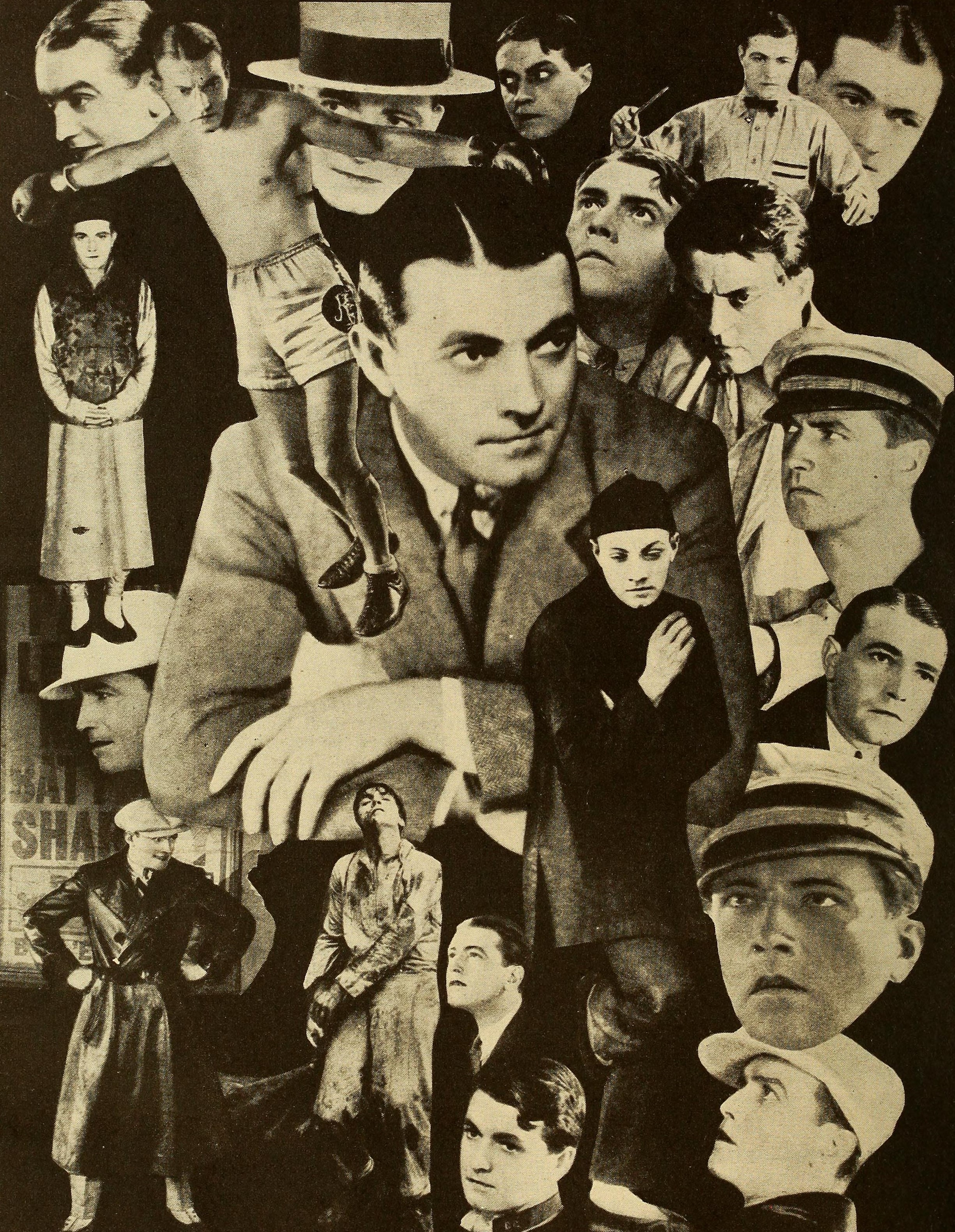
Another collage of stills from various films, 1930

Features

Year	Title	Role	Notes
1916	Gloria's Romance	Bit role	Uncredited; Lost film
1916	War Brides	Arno	Lost film
1916	Snow White	Pie Man	Uncredited
1916	Just a Song at Twilight	George Turner	Lost film
1917	The Moral Code	Gary Miller	
1917	The Eternal Sin	Gennaro	Lost film
1917	The Valentine Girl	Robert Wentworth	Lost film
1917	The Soul of a Magdalen	Louis Broulette	Lost film
1917	The Streets of Illusion	Donald Morton	
1917	Camille	Bit role	Lost film
1917	Bab's Diary	Tommy Gray	Lost film
1917	Bab's Burglar	Tommy Gray	Lost film
1917	Nearly Married	Dick Griffon	Incomplete
1917	For Valour	Henry Nobbs	Lost film
1917	The Seven Swans	Prince Charming	Lost film
1918	Sunshine Nan	MacPherson Clark	Lost film
1918	Rich Man, Poor Man	Bayard Varick	Lost film
1918	Hit-The-Trail Holliday	Bobby Jason	Lost film
1918	Wild Primrose	Jack Wilton	Lost film
1918	The Hope Chest	Tom Ballantyne	Lost film
1919	Boots	Everett White	Lost film
1919	The Girl Who Stayed at Home	Ralph Grey	
1919	Three Men and a Girl	Christopher Kent	Lost film
1919	Peppy Polly	Dr. James Merritt	Lost film
1919	Broken Blossoms	Cheng Huan - The Yellow Man	
1919	I'll Get Him Yet	Scoop McCready	Lost film
1919	Scarlet Days	Don Maria Alvarez	
1920	The Idol Dancer	Dan McGuire	
1920	The Love Flower	Bruce Sanders	
1920	Way Down East	David Bartlett	
1921	Experience	Youth	Lost film
1921	Tol'able David	David Kinemon	
1922	The Seventh Day	John Alden Jr.	
1922	Sonny	Sonny Crosby / Joe	Lost film
1922	The Bond Boy	Peter Newbolt (father) / John Newbolt	Lost film
1923	Fury	Boy Leyton	Lost film
1923	The Bright Shawl	Charles Abbott	
1923	The Fighting Blade	Karl Van Kerstenbroock	
1923	Twenty-One	Julian McCullough	Lost film
1924	The Enchanted Cottage	Oliver Bashforth	
1924	Classmates	Duncan Irving Jr	Lost film
1925	New Toys	Will Webb	Lost film
1925	Soul-Fire	Eric Fane	
1925	Shore Leave	D.X. (Bilge) Smith	
1925	The Beautiful City	Tony Gillardi	Lost film
1926	Just Suppose	Prince Rupert of Koronia	
1926	Ranson's Folly	Lt. Ranson	
1926	The Amateur Gentleman	Barnabas Barty	Lost film
1926	The White Black Sheep	Robert Kincarin	Lost film
1927	The Patent Leather Kid	Patent Leather Kid	
1927	The Drop Kick	Jack Hamill	
1928	The Noose	Nickie Elkins	
1928	The Little Shepherd of Kingdom Come	Chad Buford	Lost film
1928	Wheel of Chance	Nicolai Turkeltaub / Jacob Taline	Lost film
1928	Out of the Ruins	Lt. Pierre Dumont	Lost film
1928	Scarlet Seas	Steven Dunkin	
1929	Weary River	Jerry Larrabee	
1929	Drag	David Carroll	
1929	Young Nowheres	Albert 'Binky' Whalen	Lost film
1929	The Show of Shows	'Meet My Sister' Presenter	
1930	Son of the Gods	Sam Lee	
1930	The Dawn Patrol	Dick Courtney	
1930	The Lash	Francisco Delfino 'Pancho'	
1931	The Finger Points	Breckenridge 'Breck' Lee	
1931	The Last Flight	Cary Lockwood	
1932	Alias the Doctor	Karl Brenner	
1932	The Cabin in the Cotton	Marvin Blake	
1933	Central Airport	James 'Jim' Blaine	
1933	Heroes for Sale	Tom Holmes	
1934	Massacre	Chief Joe Thunderhorse	
1934	A Modern Hero	Pierre Radier aka Paul Rader	
1934	Midnight Alibi	Lance McGowan / Robert Anders	
1935	Four Hours to Kill!	Tony Mako	
1936	Spy of Napoleon	Gerard de Lanoy	
1939	Only Angels Have Wings	Bat MacPherson	
1940	The Man Who Talked Too Much	J.B. Roscoe	
1942	The Spoilers	Bronco Kid Farrow	
1942	The Mayor of 44th Street	Ed Kirby	

Short subjects

Year	Title	Role	Notes
1926	Camille	Gaston	Home movie by cariacaturist Ralph Barton
1931	The Stolen Jools	Himself	
1931	How I Play Golf, by Bobby Jones No. 1: The Putter	Himself	Uncredited
1935	Starlit Days at the Lido	Himself	Uncredited
1941	Meet the Stars #5: Hollywood Meets the Navy	Himself	Uncredited

== See also ==
- List of actors with Academy Award nominations

== Bibliography ==
- Hammond, Michael (2013). "War Relic and Forgotten Man: Richard Barthelmess as Celluloid Veteran in Hollywood 1922–1933". Journal of War & Culture Studies. 6 (4): 282–301. doi:10.1179/1752628013Y.0000000005.
