= Goldwyn =

Goldwyn is both a surname and a given name. Notable people with the name include:

== Surname ==
- Beryl Goldwyn (born 1930), English ballerina
- John Goldwyn (born 1958), American film producer
- Liz Goldwyn (born 1976), American film director
- Robert Goldwyn (1930–2010), American surgeon and writer
- Samuel Goldwyn (1879–1974), American film producer
- Samuel Goldwyn Jr. (1926–2015), American film producer
- Tony Goldwyn (born 1960), American actor

== Given name ==
- Goldwyn Arthur Martin (1913–2001), Canadian judge
- Goldwyn Prince (born 1974), Antigua and Barbuda cricketer

== See also ==
- Metro-Goldwyn-Mayer, an American media company
- Goldwyn Pictures, a defunct American media company
