= The Bowery Hotel =

Hotel in Manhattan, New York

Coordinates: 40.7261°N 73.9915°W

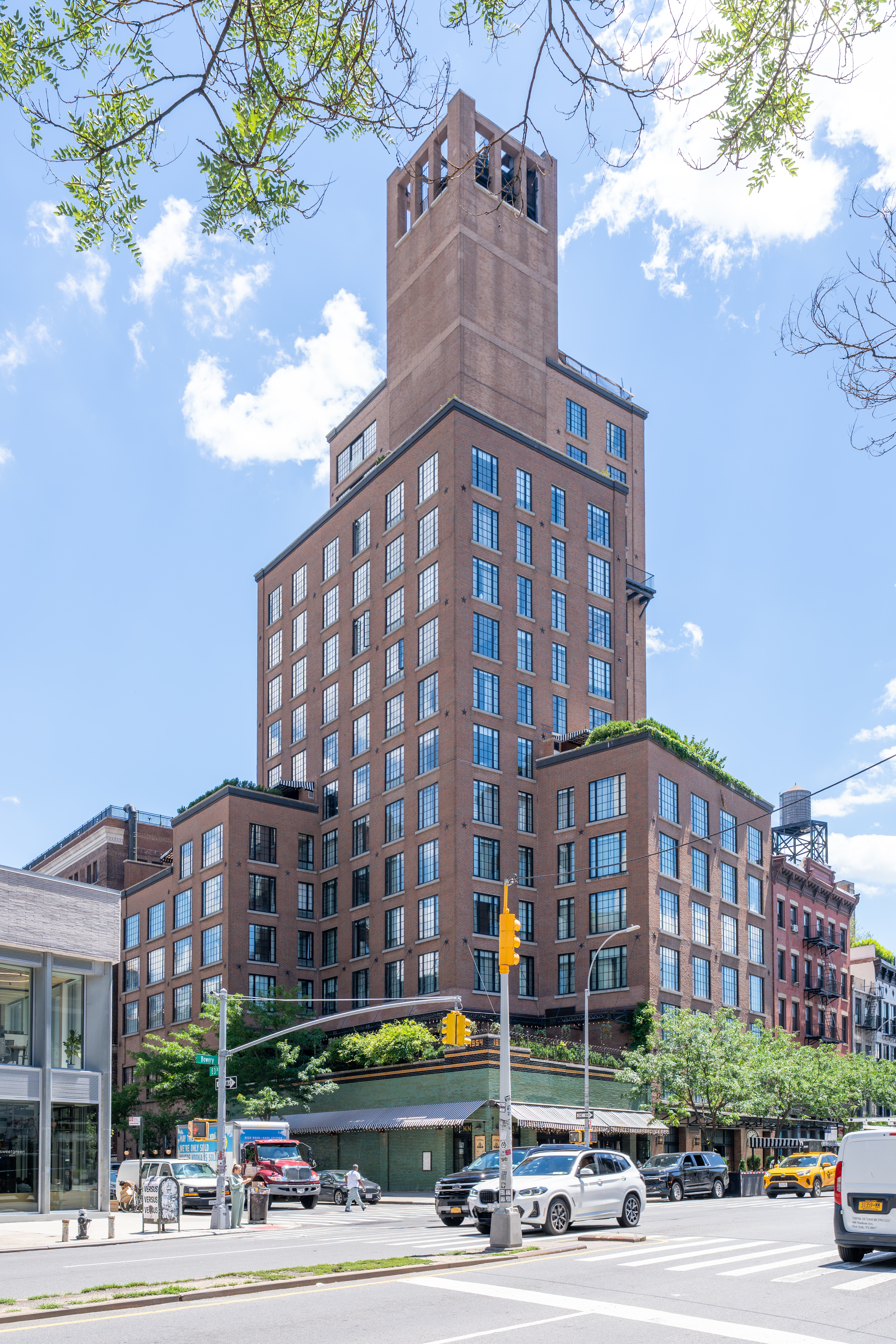
- The Bowery Hotel (2026)
- Interactive map of the The Bowery Hotel area

General information
- Location: 335 Bowery; Manhattan, New York City, New York
- Opening: February 2007
- Owner: Sean MacPherson; Eric Goode; BD Hotels

Technical details
- Floor count: 17

Design and construction
- Architect: Scarano & Associates Architects

Other information
- Number of rooms: 110
- Number of suites: 25
- Number of restaurants: 1

Website
- theboweryhotel.com

The Bowery Hotel is a hotel at 335 Bowery, in the East Village neighborhood of Manhattan in New York City. It was co-founded by conservationist and entrepreneur Eric Goode and fellow nightlife impresario Sean MacPherson.

Italian trattoria Gemma opened after the hotel, in 2007, and operates the hotel's room service as well.

Co-owners MacPherson, Goode, Ira Drukier and Richard Born, who have opened a "cache of Midtown Manhattan properties converted into boutique sanctuaries", purchased the land beneath The Bowery Hotel in 2011, from the estate of Alan I. Guior.

Notable guests have included Zayn Malik, Jennifer Jason Leigh, Gigi Hadid, Jennifer Lopez, Liv Tyler, Charli XCX, Kate Hudson, Sting, Keith Richards, Bruce Willis, Kiefer Sutherland, Blake Lively, Jude Law, Robert Pattinson, Alison Brie, Jonah Hill, Chris Hemsworth, David Beckham, Charlotte Gainsbourg and Kristen Stewart.

In 2011 Paul McCartney and Nancy Shevell held a second celebration of their betrothal at the hotel. Guests at the fete included Barbara Walters (Shevell's second cousin, who introduced the couple), then–New York City mayor Michael Bloomberg, Ralph Lauren, Yoko Ono, and Sean Lennon.

The painter Domingo Zapata has kept an art studio atop the hotel.

== In popular culture ==
The hotel is referenced in the song "It Ain't Me" by Kygo and Selena Gomez. Father John Misty's 2018 album God's Favorite Customer was inspired by a two-month period in which the singer-songwriter's life "blew up", figuratively, and he spent the duration of this period living in the hotel. Omar Apollo also references the hotel in "3 Boys".

Addison Rae references the Hotel in her song "New York" from her debut album Addison.
