= American Seamen's Friend Society Sailors' Home and Institute =

Hotel in Manhattan, New York

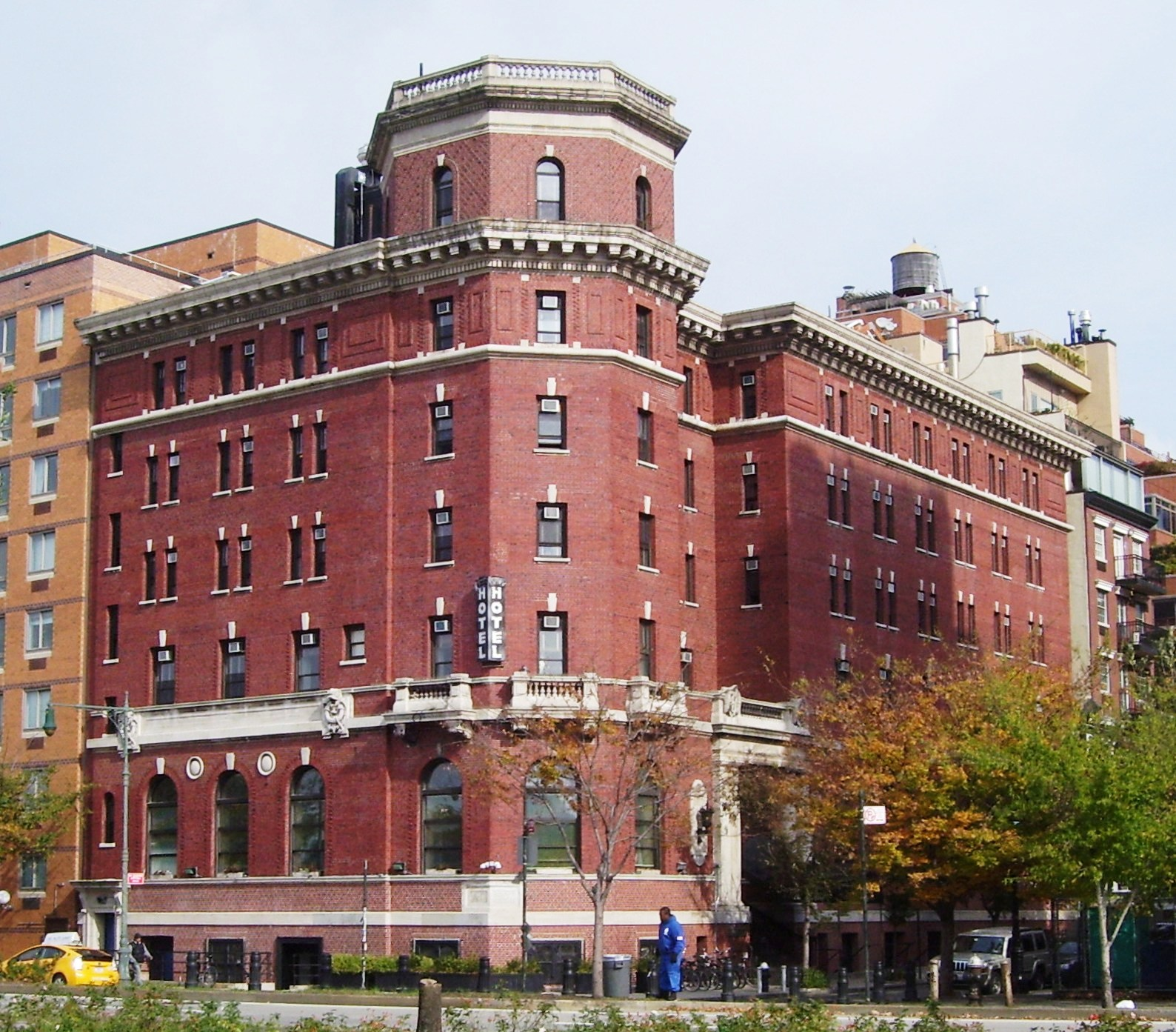
- The building as seen from across the West Side Highway
- Former names: Seaman's House YMCA, Seaman's Relief Center, Jane West Hotel, Hotel Riverview, The Jane
- Alternative names: West Village EuroHostel

General information
- Type: Boutique hotel
- Architectural style: Georgian Revival
- Location: Manhattan, 505–507 West Street, New York City, United States
- Coordinates: 40°44′18″N 74°00′34″W
- Construction started: 1907
- Completed: October 7, 1908
- Renovated: 2008
- Owner: Jeff Klein

Technical details
- Floor count: 6
- Grounds: 8,812 ft^{2} (818.7 m^{2})

Design and construction
- Architect: William A. Boring
- Developer: American Seamen's Friend Society
- Main contractor: Richard Deeves & Son

Other information
- Number of rooms: 200
- Public transit: Subway: 14th Street–Eighth Avenue

New York City Landmark
- Designated: November 28, 2000
- Reference no.: 2080

The American Seamen's Friend Society Sailors' Home and Institute is a boutique hotel building at 505–507 West Street, on the northeastern corner with Jane Street, in the West Village neighborhood of Manhattan in New York City. It was constructed in 1908 by the American Seaman's Friend Society (ASFS) as a sailors' boarding house. The ASFS building was designed by William A. Boring in the Georgian style and is a New York City designated landmark.

The ASFS building has a red brick facade with cast-stone detailing and is mostly five stories tall, with a main entrance portico on Jane Street. There is a six-story polygonal tower at the corner of West and Jane Street, which was originally surmounted by a beacon. When the Sailors' Home and Institute opened, there were 200 bedrooms and numerous social rooms, as well as amenities such as a chapel, an auditorium, and a bowling alley. Over the years, the ground story has been used for various purposes, including as a bar and grill, a clubhouse, a nightclub, the off-Broadway Jane Street Theater, and a ballroom. Many of the guestrooms are extremely small, averaging 50 ft^{2} (4.6 m^{2}).

The ASFS acquired land for a new boarding house at 507 West Street in 1905 after its previous boarding house was demolished. Construction of 507 West Street began in 1907 following a donation from philanthropist Olivia Sage, and the building was dedicated on October 7, 1908. The building was initially only open to sailors, and in 1912 house survivors from the sinking of the RMS Titanic. After the ASFS and two other organizations constructed the Seaman's House nearby in 1931, the YMCA operated 507 West Street as an annex of the Seaman's House. 507 West Street became the Jane West Hotel in 1946, and it was renamed the Hotel Riverview by the 1980s. The Riverview was acquired in 2008 by a group who renovated it into the Jane, a boutique hotel operated by BD Hotels. The hotelier Jeff Klein acquired the Jane in 2022 and converted its ballroom into a private club. As of 2025, the hotel had been renamed the West Village Eurohostel.

== Site ==
The American Seamen's Friend Society Sailors' Home and Institute is at 505–507 West Street in the West Village neighborhood of Manhattan in New York City. It occupies the northeast corner of West Street and Jane Street, on the eastern shoreline of the Hudson River, just south of the Meatpacking District. The building is on the southwestern portion of a city block bounded by West Street to the west, Horatio Street to the north, Washington Street to the east, and Jane Street to the south. The quadrilateral site covers 8,812 square feet (818.7 m^{2}), with a frontage of 135.18 feet (41.20 m) on Jane Street and a depth of 66.21 ft (20.18 m). Historically, the site directly faced the pier of the Cunard Line on the Hudson River.

== Architecture ==
The building was designed by William Alciphron Boring for the American Seamen's Friend Society. Most of the hotel building is five stories tall, but there is a six-story polygonal tower at the southwest corner (facing Jane and West Streets). Above a portion of the main roof is a penthouse that abuts the tower. There is an interior light court above the second floor. The superstructure is made of iron and steel, while the foundation is composed of concrete footings.

The facade was originally supposed to be made of white granite on the first story and red brick above. During the construction process, some of the materials in the original design were substituted or removed. For example, cast stone was used instead of white granite; buff brick was used in place of red brick on secondary facades; and a set of pergolas on the roof were removed. The portico on Jane Street was not part of the original plan.

=== Facade ===
As built, the primary facades on West and Jane Streets are made of red brick in English bond, with trim made of cast stone, while the secondary facades to the north and east are made of buff brick. The West Street elevation of the facade is divided vertically into three full-width bays and one half-width bay, while the Jane Street elevation is divided into six full-width bays. The windows at the first story are round-arched, while those on upper stories are rectangular; each of the full-width bays contains two windows on the top three stories. The original wood sash windows have been replaced with aluminum windows over the years. There is an entrance portico just east of the tower at the corner of Jane and West Streets. String courses and band courses run horizontally across the facade above the basement, first story, and fourth story, as well as at the height of the window sills on the first and second stories. The fifth story is decorated with patterned brick panels. The eastern elevation is partially visible from the street and contains a fire escape, a chimney, string courses, and red-and-buff brick.

The northern end of the West Street elevation contains an entrance with a molded frame, metal door, and an entablature with brackets; above this entrance are single, narrow windows on the first to fourth floor. Near the southern end is an entrance in the basement with a metal door. There is a recessed areaway with a metal railing in between these two entrances. The three full-width bays each contain one arched window at the first story, with roundels above the center window on either side. Above the first story is a horizontal band of molded cartouches, which represent maritime motifs like anchors, buoys, fish, and ropes. The tower at the corner of West and Jane Streets contains four sides facing the street. At the first story is a cornerstone with the text "A. D. 1907" inscribed into it. The second story of the tower contains balconies supported by brackets, and the other stories of the tower are largely similar to the rest of the facade. The sixth story contains round-arched windows with patterned brickwork and is topped by a cornice and balustrade. The roof originally contained a beacon, which was removed circa 1946.

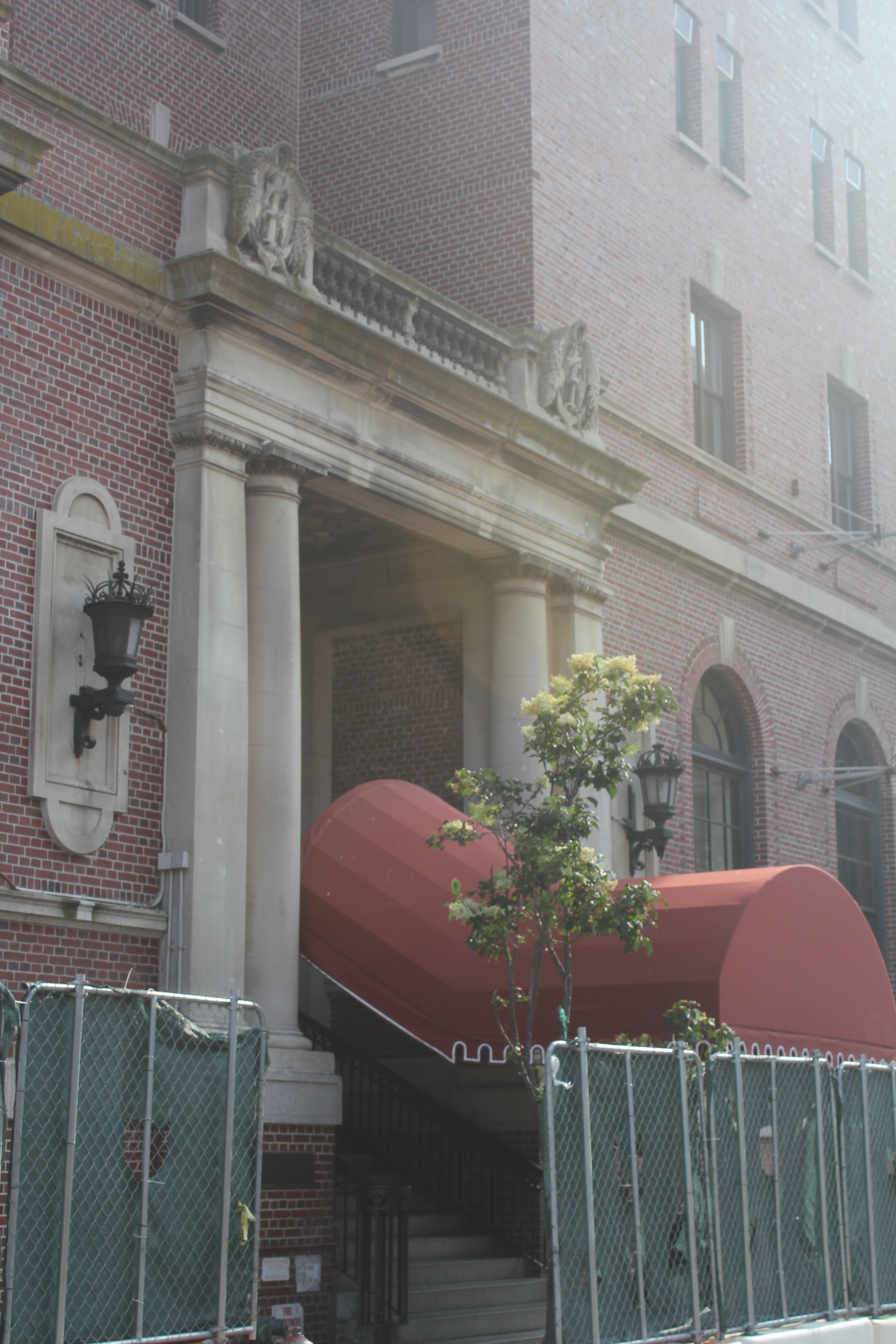
The main entrance seen from Jane and West Streets

There is another areaway on the Jane Street elevation, accessed by a stone stoop. At basement level on Jane Street, three bays contain metal doors, while the other bays contain windows or louvers. There are round-arched windows on the first story. In the easternmost bay, a stone stoop ascends to an entrance at the first story. The westernmost bay contains a rectangular portico flanked by columns and pilasters; there is an entablature above, which in turn is topped by a balustrade with cartouches at either end. A set of stone stairs with iron railings leads up to the portico, which contains brick panels on the side walls, as well as Guastavino tiles on the ceiling. The main entrance, under the portico, consists of wood-and-glass double doors topped by a transom window, flanked by sidelights, and surrounded with a molding.

=== Interior ===
==== Rooms ====
When the American Seaman's Friend Society Building opened, there were 200 rooms. The vast majority, between 156 and 170 rooms, were for sailors. Of the remaining rooms, 32 were reserved for officers and engineers; there was another dormitory with 24 beds for stewards and cooks. Some of the rooms had portraits of European kings, including Edward VII of England, Victor Emmanuel III of Italy, Wilhelm II of Germany, and Frederik VIII of Denmark. The bedrooms were akin to short-term hotel rooms and were laid out along two corridors; each room measured 7 by 7 ft (2.1 by 2.1 m). The rooms had bunk beds at some point throughout their history. The New York Times wrote in 1998 that the rooms still looked "remarkably like steerage berths".

The building was an upscale hotel by 2008, although the rooms retained their previous sizes, and the number of rooms was unchanged. Each room had a single bed above a set of drawers, a mirrored wall, and a brass rail to hang clothes from. To compensate for the small size of the rooms, co-owner Sean MacPherson added "micro-luxury" features such as flat-screen TVs and free Wi-Fi. The rooms were decorated to resemble both ships' cabins and train cars. Most guestrooms were branded as "standard cabins", which measured about 50 ft^{2} (4.6 m^{2}) and lacked their own bathrooms. Some rooms had bunk beds and were labeled as "bunk cabins"; they also did not have bathrooms. There were two communal bathrooms on each floor for occupants of these rooms. The hotel also contained some "captains' cabins" with private bathrooms, each measuring about 250 ft^{2} (23.2 m^{2}). Each guestroom key has a metal peg; as an energy-saving measure, the lights in each guestroom are only turned on after the peg is inserted into the wall.

==== Public areas ====
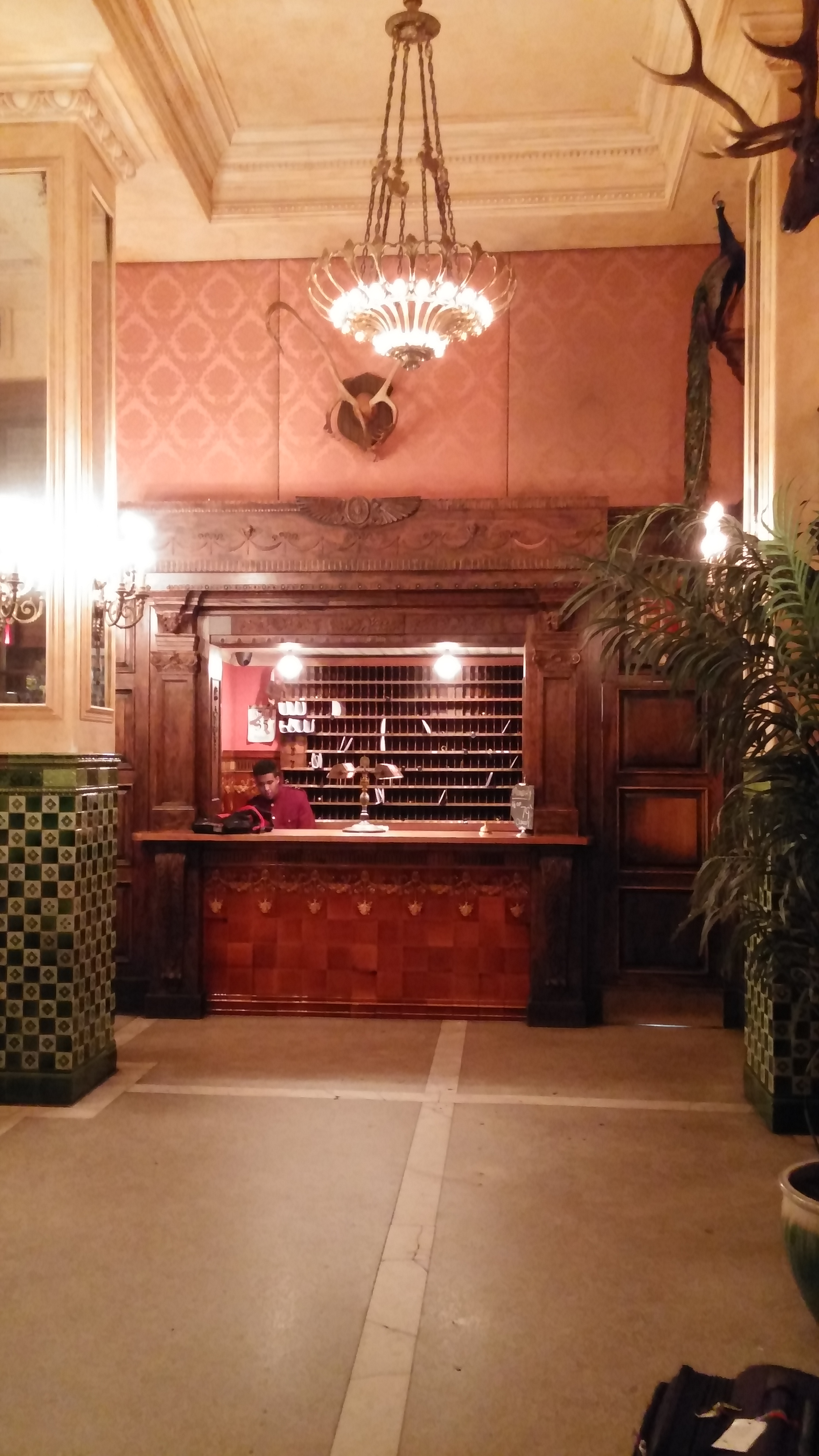
The hotel's foyer

Originally, the building had amenities such as social rooms, cue sports tables, a swimming pool, a bowling alley, showers, a chapel, auditorium, bank, outfitting shop, and restaurant. The swimming pool, bowling alley, and restaurant were in the basement. The auditorium, the society's offices, and social rooms were on the first story; the auditorium could accommodate 400 people. The second story contained the chapel, billiards rooms, and lounge rooms, while the other stories contained bedrooms. The social rooms were divided into three groups for seamen, officers and engineers, and stewards and cooks. The top of the building housed a roof garden and observation deck shared by all occupants.

The ground floor was used for commercial purposes starting in the 1930s, housing such varied tenants as a bar and grill, an office, a lunchroom, clubhouses, and a theater. The auditorium (also known as the ballroom) was first converted into a theatrical space by Theater for the New City in 1972 before becoming a bar and nightclub in the 1980s. In 1997, the Westside Theater Company leased the space and converted it into the Jane Street Theatre, an Off-Broadway theater with a very small thrust stage and a seating capacity of 280. Notable shows presented at the theater include Hedwig and the Angry Inch in 1998 and tick, tick ... BOOM! in 2001. When the building became the Jane Hotel in 2009, the theater space was converted into the Jane Ballroom, and the hotel's swimming room was restored. In addition to the ballroom, the hotel's ground floor contained the Cafe Gitane and a small lobby. The ballroom closed in 2022 and became part of a private club.

== History ==
=== American Seaman's Friend Society ===
The Port of New York and New Jersey became the United States' largest port in the early 19th century and one of the world's busiest ports during the early 20th century. This was in part because of the rise of maritime activity along the North River (Hudson River), which by 1890 had surpassed the East River to become New York City's busiest maritime district. Many boarding houses for sailors were developed on New York City's shoreline to accommodate the maritime trade, providing short-term lodging for sailors. The American Seaman's Friend Society (ASFS), established in 1828, was one of several organizations that operated sailors' boarding houses. The ASFS operated a boarding house at 190 Cherry Street, along the East River, from the early 1840s to 1903, when the New York City government acquired the structure and demolished it to make way for the Manhattan Bridge.

==== Development and early years ====
After the Cherry Street boarding house was demolished, the ASFS decided to relocate to the West Side of Manhattan, where the maritime industry was busier. In January 1905, the ASFS acquired a site on the northeast corner of Jane and West Streets from the Paterno brothers for $70,000. The organization considered erecting another boarding house on that site for over a year; during this time, the ASFS could not provide any lodging for sailors. A rival organization, the Seamen's Church Institute, announced plans in early 1906 to erect the world's largest boarding house on the East River, prompting ASFS officials to reconsider the development of the Jane Street boarding house. By that April, the ASFS had prepared plans for their own boarding house on Jane Street, which was to cost $225,000 and measure 135 by 65 ft (41 by 20 m). The firm of Boring & Tilton was hired to design the ASFS's boarding house.

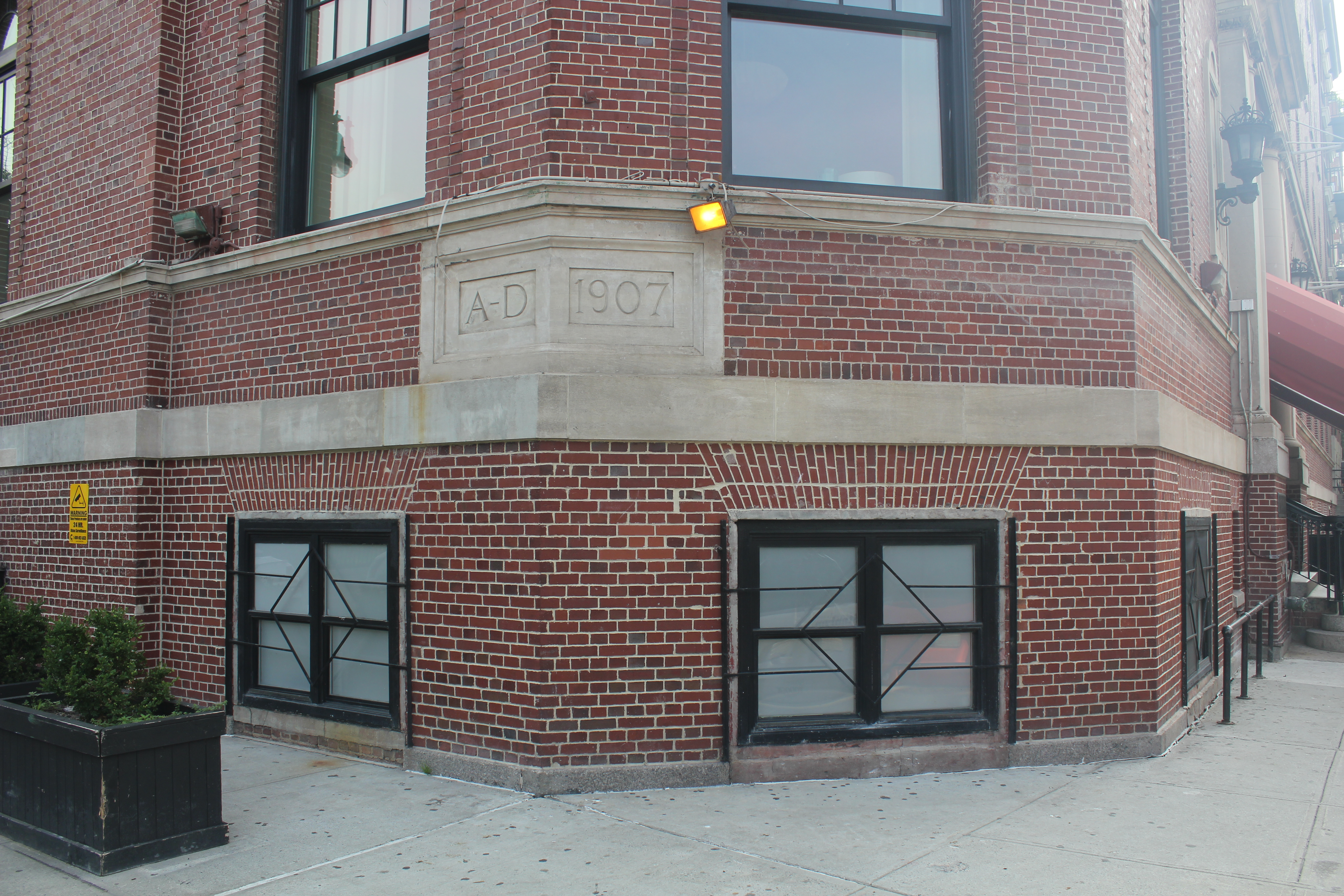
The building's cornerstone (at center) was laid on November 26, 1907.

The philanthropist Olivia Sage, widow of financier Russell Sage and a family member of ASFS president Charles A. Stoddard, announced in March 1907 that she would give $150,000 toward the construction of the Seamen's Home. A biographer for the ASFS described it as "the largest single gift for seamen's work up to that time". In exchange, Sage told Stoddard that "you have to make the building correct and adequate from the start". By then, the proposed boarding house was to contain 225 guest rooms, a shipping bureau, various communal rooms, an auditorium, a banking room, officers' and engineers' club rooms, headquarters for the ASFS, and a chapel. Richard Deeves & Son was hired in July 1907 as the building's general contractor. The building's cornerstone was laid on November 26, 1907, at which point the building's cost had grown to $325,000.

==== Opening and use as boarding house ====
The new building at 507 West Street was dedicated on October 7, 1908, the week of the 80th anniversary of the society's founding. Half of the rooms were still unfurnished at the time, and the society planned to raise $50,000 to fit out these rooms. 507 West Street was originally known as the Sailors' Home and Institute; seamen could rent the bedrooms for 25 cents per night, while it cost officers 50 to 75 cents nightly. The building's chapel, known as the Church of the Sea, opened in April 1910, with Edward M. Deens as the first pastor. The ASFS also had offices in the building. In its 1911 annual report, the ASFS wrote that the building was intended as "a bright, airy, comfortable place to sit without being annoyed by the fumes of liquor or soul-rasping profanity".

The Sailors' Home and Institute quickly became popular, accommodating 16,000 sailors just in February 1909. An ASFS historian wrote that the ASFS Building was "the most popular resort for seamen in the port". By the early 1910s, the ASFS frequently had to request donations for its boarding house, and the society's secretary began raising money for an addition in 1911. After the sinking of the RMS Titanic in 1912, the crew of the Titanic was temporarily housed in the Sailors' Home and Institute. Afterward, the ASFS commissioned a plaque for the building, memorializing those who died in the sinking. Olivia Sage donated another $25,000 for the maintenance of the Sailors' Home and Institute in 1916.

By the early 1920s, the Sailors' Home and Institute accommodated 150,000 seamen every year. The ASFS reported in 1924 that the West Street boarding house was the busiest of 13 locations it operated worldwide. Of the 165,000 sailors who visited the building that year, nearly 80 thousand rented rooms, while close to five thousand visited the chapel. A plaque was mounted on the building during the ASFS's centennial in 1928. Two other seaman's-welfare organizations had opened boarding houses nearby by the 1920s: the YMCA, which opened the Merchant Seamen's Branch at 525 West 23rd Street in 1920, and the Seamen's Christian Association at 399 West Street, which had been operating since 1888. The ASFS formed an alliance with the other two organizations during the late 1920s. The combined organization announced plans in May 1929 to erect a new structure, known as the Merchants' Memorial Building or Seamen's House. The old ASFS Building at 507 West Street was placed for sale by April 1931, but the building was never sold.

When another boarding house, the eight-story Seaman's House, opened nearby at 11th Avenue and 20th Street in November 1931, the ASFS Building at 507 West Street became an annex of the new Seaman's House. Subsequently, 507 West Street was known as the Seaman's House YMCA or the Seaman's Relief Center. Because of overcrowding on the upper stories, the YMCA laid out 70 cots in the auditorium in 1933. The YMCA took over 507 West Street completely in 1944. U.S. first lady Eleanor Roosevelt visited the building in December 1945 to raise $40,000 for an upcoming renovation, which was formally announced the next month. By then, 507 West Street accommodated between 150 and 175 sailors on average.

=== Hotel use ===
==== 1940s to 1970s ====
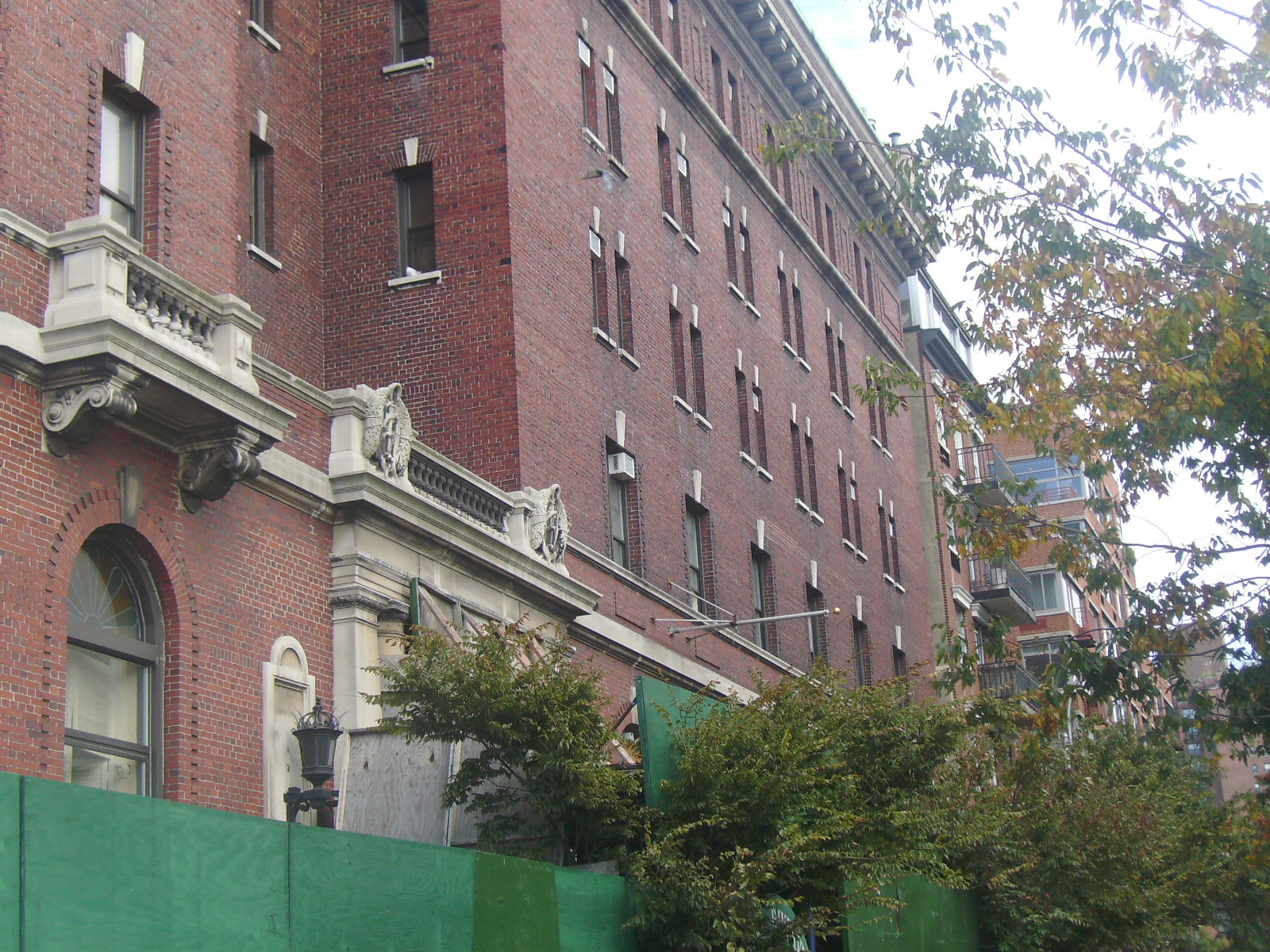
View of the Jane Street facade

The Jane-West Corporation bought 507 West Street in December 1946 for approximately $152,500; the buyer gave the YMCA a mortgage of $117,500. The new owners began operating the building as a hotel, known as the Jane West. The hotel building was sold in June 1951 to Benbar Associates, headed by Sidney Doloboff. The Jane West was again sold in 1967, this time to Hotel Associates. By then, maritime activity on the adjacent section of the Hudson River had declined steeply due to the increasing popularity of air travel and containerization. As a result, many maritime-related buildings on the shoreline were demolished; the Jane West was one of a few remaining maritime structures in the area by the late 20th century. The building's western facade faced the West Side Elevated Highway, which had been erected in the 1930s and remained until the 1970s.

The Jane West retained its small rooms over the years. By the early 1970s, The New York Times described the hotel as having many long-term residents who received welfare payments, as well as drug addicts. The New York City Department of Social Services recorded 250 single men as living in the Jane West during late 1970. The New York Times wrote in 1972 that the hotel "was not a breeding ground for crime and drugs at all. Rather, it housed a population of sick, derelict old men, men who themselves were the helpless victims of addicts." The Manhattan Bowery Corporation moved into the hotel in October 1973 and began operating a detox center there. The detox center, on the top story, contained 14 beds for recovering addicts. The Theater for the New City also began operating an off-off-Broadway theater on the Jane West's ground floor around July 1972. The theater had leaky ceilings, and the space was so small that actors often rehearsed on the street or on an adjacent pier. During this decade, the hotel was also known for hosting rock and roll clubs.

==== 1980s to 2000s ====
The Jane West was known as the Riverview Hotel by the 1980s, and the Times described the Riverview as housing "S&M clubs" during this decade. A club known as the Inner Circle opened in the hotel's ballroom around 1985; within two years, the space was occupied by another club named Saigon Royale/Le Tango. The Payday and $100,000 Bar clubs also temporarily used the Jane West's ballroom during the same decade. By that time, numerous art-related concerns were moving to the far western portion of West Village, and a gallery named Profile had opened within the hotel. In addition, during the mid-1980s, the American drag performer RuPaul lived in the tower of the hotel. After the Attorney General of New York investigated claims that the hotel's managers refused to allow tenants to install their own phones, Hotel Associates agreed to install a phone in every guestroom in 1988. By the late 1980s, the Jane West no longer accepted new single room occupancy tenants; existing residents were allowed to stay, but new guests could only rent rooms for up to 14 days.

The Westside Theater Company took over the Riverview's ballroom in mid-1997, renovating it for two months to accommodate the off-Broadway musical Hedwig and the Angry Inch. The ballroom was in poor shape; the musical's composer Stephen Trask said: "When the toilets in bathrooms above us overflow and the ceiling leaks, people think that's part of the show." The New York City Landmarks Preservation Commission designated the Hotel Riverview as a New York City landmark in November 2000, citing the hotel building's history as a maritime boarding house. A club known as Salon, occupying part of the building's original salon, opened on two stories of the hotel in 2005; the club's design was intended to evoke the decor of the Weimar Republic. As late as 2007, the Riverview charged a nightly room rate of $30, at a time when the average hotel room in New York City cost $300 per night.

==== Conversion to boutique hotel ====
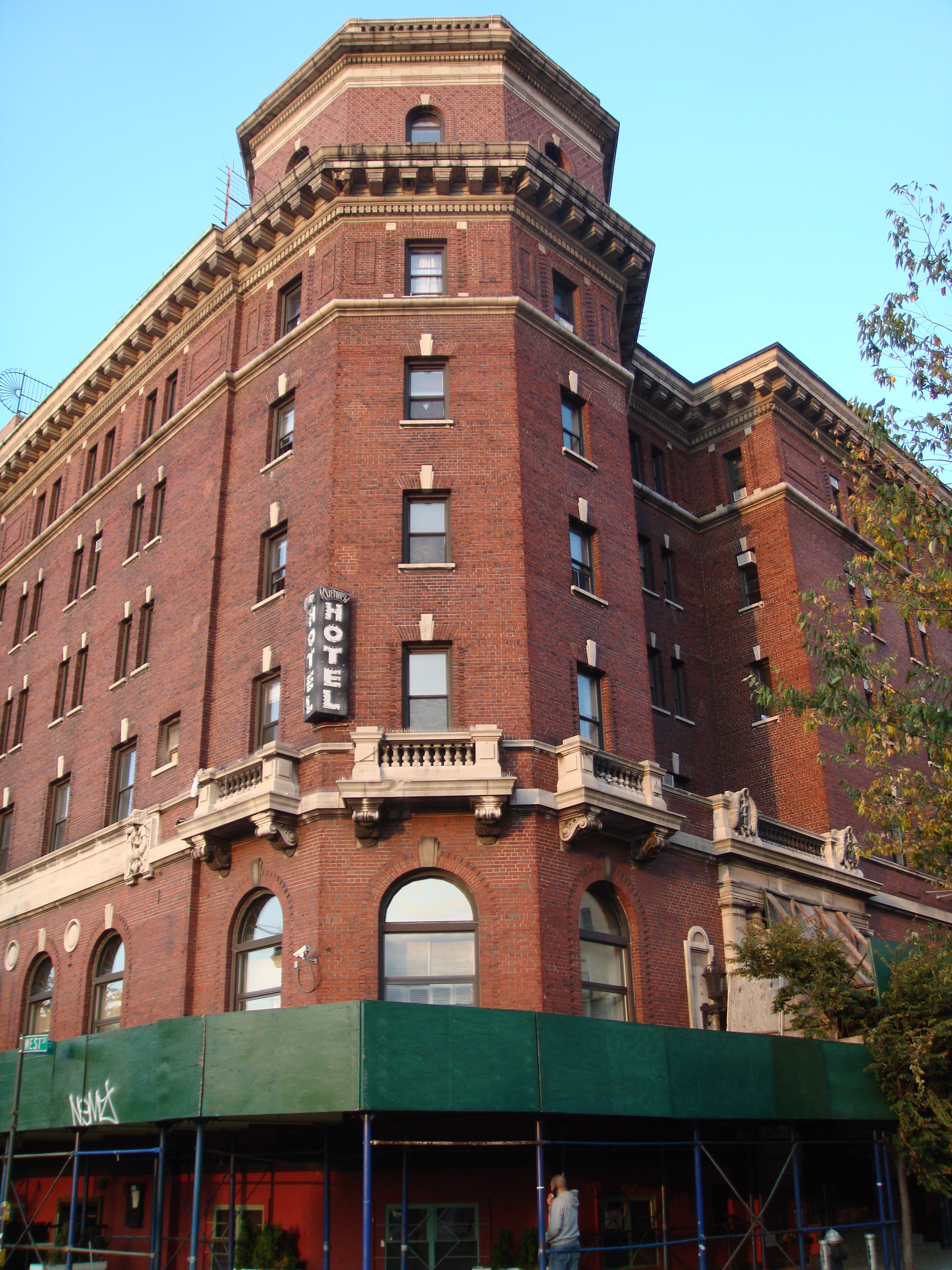
View of the hotel's polygonal tower from ground level

The hotel was acquired in early 2008 by Sean MacPherson, Eric Goode, Ira Drukier, and Richard Born for $27 million. MacPherson, who lived around the corner from the hotel, said that he had "always dreamed of owning this property". The new owners, in partnership with BD Hotels, converted the Riverview into a boutique hotel. The owners began renovating the hotel in January 2008, before they received a permit from the New York City Department of Buildings, which placed a stop-work order on the project after receiving complaints from existing tenants. Numerous tenants claimed that their quality of life had declined as a result of the renovations, and some existing residents were evicted.

The owners redesigned the rooms and added air-conditioning, Wi-Fi, and flat-screen TVs. The new designs were partially inspired by some of MacPherson's favorite films; he wanted the hotel's overall decor to resemble "a mansion in decline", similar to in the 2001 film The Royal Tenenbaums. The phrase "a day or a lifetime", the motto of a hotel in the 1991 film Barton Fink, was printed on stationery, while the small rooms were redesigned to look like staterooms in the 2007 film The Darjeeling Limited. In addition, the owners added rooms with private baths; opened a spa in the basement; and restored the swimming pool. The first renovated guestrooms opened in June 2008, while the remaining rooms were reopened as they were completed. MacPherson opened the Jane Rooftop, a members-only club on the roof, the same year.

A nightclub opened within the building's lobby bar, ballroom, and mezzanine in June 2009. Operated by Carlos Quirarte and Matt Kliegman, the nightclub was described by New York magazine as having "the most happening scene in town, luring everyone from Williamsburg stylists to Justin Theroux". The club soon attracted noise complaints from neighbors. It was raided in October 2009 after police discovered that the bar did not have an assembly permit. The Jane's operators shuttered the ballroom pending the issuance of a permit, but inspectors subsequently found more violations of city building codes. The ballroom reopened in May 2010 and quickly became known as one of New York City's hardest venues to get into. The New York Times reported that the ballroom had a "homey and generally permissive atmosphere" that attracted younger partygoers, including celebrities and models such as the Olsen twins, Lindsay Lohan, Paloma Elsesser, Julia Fox, and Richie Shazam. The hotel was described as being among a "cache of Midtown Manhattan properties converted into boutique sanctuaries" by MacPherson, Goode, Drukier, and Born.

The hotelier Jeff Klein indicated in early 2022 that he would convert the Jane Hotel into an offshoot of the San Vicente Bungalows private club on the West Coast of the United States. Klein hired Rose Uniacke to redesign the hotel and invited about 300 people to become members of his club. In November 2022, the Jane's ballroom and roof bar were closed in preparation for their conversion into a private club. The club included living rooms, dance rooms, a screening room, and a billiards room. A press release erroneously announced that the entire hotel would close, causing confusion over whether the guestrooms would be turned into a private club, but Klein clarified that only the ballroom and bar would close. Klein acquired the entire hotel that December from BD Hotels for $62 million. The San Vicente Bungalows club formally opened in March 2025. As of 2025, the hotel had been renamed the West Village Eurohostel.

== Critical reception ==
When the ASFS building was constructed, the Hartford Courant described it as "towering like a fortress against the army of crimps that swarms about its doors". The New York Observer and Chronicle wrote that the building had been "an experiment"; many of its features, such as rooms for cooks and stewards, had not been incorporated into earlier boarding houses. Harper's Weekly wrote that the building was "the greatest non-resident club in the world".

When the hotel was still known as the Riverview, a critic for the Evening Post of New Zealand wrote in 2000: "Its lamentable lack of an elevator, concierge who speaks English and too-few bathrooms situated several blocks away from the too-many bedrooms is as nought compared with the state of the room itself. This can best be described as a monastic cell with greasy bed linen and no air conditioning (don't even think of it in summer)." Just before the 2008 renovation, Tripadvisor ranked the Riverview as one of New York City's least popular hotels. Out of the 339 hotels in the city, the Riverview was the 308th most popular.

After the ASFS building was renovated into the Jane, it received largely positive reviews, despite the small guestrooms. The New York Times wrote, in 2010, that the hotel "embodies [the] spirit" of a "living room for the neighborhood where guests and New Yorkers could mingle". During the hotel's renovation, another New York Times critic wrote that "the dingy lobby looked like the set of a 1970s Al Pacino film" but that the tiny room could have "passed for a luxury train cabin". After the renovation was finished, a critic for The Guardian wrote: "The rooms are still tiny and still cheap, but quite a bit nicer. [...] At $99 a night, bathroom or not, the rooms are still the best deal in the city." The Ottawa Citizen reported that few hotels "have the peculiar charms of the Jane", which benefited from its proximity to major tourist attractions and nightlife. Curbed described the hotel as having an "undefinable" theme, stating: "Expect odd quirks like stuffed monkey bellhops, a disco ball in the lobby, and hotel staff in costume."

== See also ==
- List of hotels in New York City
- List of New York City Designated Landmarks in Manhattan below 14th Street
