= Goldwin =

Goldwin may refer to:

== Surname ==
- Kyle Goldwin (born 1985), Gilbatarian footballer
- Robert Goldwin (1922–2010), American political scientist
- William Goldwin (c. 1682–1747), English schoolteacher and vicar

== First name ==
- Goldwin Corlett Elgie (1896–1975), Canadian lawyer and politician
- Goldwin Smith (1823–1910), British historian and journalist

== Middle name ==
- Hugh Goldwin Rivière (1869–1956), British portraitist
- William Goldwin Carrington Howland (1915–1994), Canadian lawyer and judge

== See also ==
- Godwin's law, Internet adage
- Goldwind, a Chinese multinational wind turbine manufacturer
- Goldwing (disambiguation)
- Goldwyn
- Goodwin (disambiguation)
