= The Swan (1956 film) =

1956 film by Charles Vidor

- Theatrical release poster
- Directed by: Charles Vidor
- Screenplay by: John Dighton
- Based on: The Swan (Á Hattyú Vigjatek Három Felvonasbarn); 1914 play by Ferenc Molnár
- Produced by: Dore Schary
- Starring: Grace Kelly; Alec Guinness; Louis Jourdan; Agnes Moorehead; Jessie Royce Landis; Brian Aherne; Leo G. Carroll; Estelle Winwood; Van Dyke Parks
- Cinematography: Joseph Ruttenberg; Robert Surtees
- Edited by: John Dunning
- Music by: Bronisław Kaper
- Production company: Metro-Goldwyn-Mayer
- Distributed by: Loew's Inc.
- Release date: April 18, 1956 (United States)
- Running time: 104 minutes
- Country: United States
- Language: English
- Budget: $3 million
- Box office: $3.7 million

The Swan is a 1956 American romantic comedy-drama film directed by Charles Vidor from a screenplay by John Dighton. It is a remake of the 1925 silent film of the same name, itself based on the play of the same name by Ferenc Molnár.

The film stars Grace Kelly, Alec Guinness, and Louis Jourdan, with Agnes Moorehead, Jessie Royce Landis, Brian Aherne, Leo G. Carroll, Estelle Winwood, and Van Dyke Parks in supporting roles. The film was released the day Kelly became princess consort of Monaco.

== Plot ==
In 1910, Princess Alexandra, the daughter of a minor branch of a European royal house, is urged by her mother to accept her cousin, Crown Prince Albert, as husband so that their family may regain a throne that was taken from them by Napoleon. Princess Alexandra tries to gain Albert's attention; he is otherwise taken with sleeping late, shooting ducks and playing football with Alexandra's two younger brothers. Alexandra's mother urges her to show interest in the tutor, Dr. Nicholas Agi, to make Albert jealous and stimulate a proposal from him.

Agi is already taken with Alexandra and when she invites him to the farewell ball for the crown prince, he eagerly accepts. Later, when they are dancing at the ball, it appears that Albert is getting jealous, but instead he is more interested in playing the bass viol in the orchestra.

Later, Agi tells Alexandra how he feels about her. She tells him it was all a ploy to get Albert to propose to her, and she suspected Agi felt this way. Alexandra realizes she has some feelings for Agi, but he refuses her. Albert discovers the situation and is a little taken aback. Albert and Agi trade insults; Agi storms out and tries to leave the next morning. Alexandra, distraught over what happened, tries to leave with him, but he refuses her again.

Albert's mother, The Queen, shows up and is aghast upon hearing the entire story. Albert gives his blessing to the pair and says that when he becomes king, he will allow them back into the country. However, Agi ends up leaving the mansion without Alexandra.

Albert tries to console Alexandra by telling her she is like a swan: on the water she looks serene, but on land she is more like a goose. Albert then offers Alexandra his arm and they walk back into the mansion together.

== Cast ==
- Grace Kelly as Princess Alexandra
- Alec Guinness as Prince Albert
- Louis Jourdan as Dr. Nicholas Agi
- Agnes Moorehead as Queen Maria Dominika
- Jessie Royce Landis as Princess Beatrix
- Brian Aherne as Father Carl Hyacinth
- Leo G. Carroll as Caesar
- Estelle Winwood as Symphorosa
- Van Dyke Parks as George
- Christopher Cook as Arsene
- Robert Coote as Capt. Wunderlich
- Doris Lloyd as Countess Sibenstoyn
- Edith Barrett as Elsa, Beatrix's maid

== Background ==
The 1925, 1930, and 1956 films are all based on the 1914 Hungarian play A Hattyú, Vígjáték Három Felvonásban (The Swan, A Comedy in Three Acts) by Ferenc Molnár.

Grace Kelly had previously appeared in the CBS Television production of The Swan on June 9, 1950. Kelly gave a "masterful" performance, according to Variety.

MGM bought the screenrights in May 1955 as a vehicle for Kelly. Head of production Dore Schary also announced he intended to remake the play, The Barretts of Wimpole Street, with Kelly.

Kelly visited the Cannes Film Festival later that month. It was there she met Prince Rainier.

By August 1955, the lead roles had been given to Louis Jourdan – who had done a screen test in Paris – and Rex Harrison. However, Harrison was unable to come to terms with the studio. By the end of the month, Alec Guinness signed to play the role – it would be his first Hollywood movie.

Director Charles Vidor said the filmmakers paid close attention to the Princess Margaret–Peter Townsend romance. "If they had wed we would have thought very seriously about changing our ending", he said. "However, by not marrying a commoner made our Swan a new, modern story. Now they can't say it's old-fashioned."

== Production ==
The film was shot on location in North Carolina, at the 1895 Biltmore Estate of George W. Vanderbilt in Asheville and at Lake Junaluska.

MGM held the release of The Swan to correspond with the civil wedding ceremony of Grace Kelly and Prince Rainier of Monaco, on April 18, 1956.

== Music ==
The score was composed by Bronislau Kaper and conducted by Johnny Green, with orchestrations by Robert Franklyn. One piece of source music, "Rakoczy March", an 1809 piece by John Bihari, was conducted by Miklós Rózsa.

MGM Records released two suites of portions of the music from the film on long-playing record after the release of the film. The complete score was released in 2004, on CD, on the Film Score Monthly label.

== Box office ==
According to MGM records, the film earned $1,763,000 in the US and Canada and $1,986,000 elsewhere, resulting in a loss of $798,000.

== Earlier film versions ==
- The 1925 silent film with the same title was directed by Dimitri Buchowetzki and starred Frances Howard as Princess Alexandra, Adolphe Menjou as Crown Prince Albert and Ricardo Cortez as the tutor. That version ends with Alexandra and the tutor kissing, and the expectation they will marry.
- One Romantic Night (1930) starred Lillian Gish as Princess Alexandra and Rod La Rocque as Prince Albert, with Conrad Nagel as the tutor. It was directed by Paul Stein.

== Original Broadway production ==
The original Broadway production of The Swan opened on Broadway in 1923, with Eva Le Gallienne as Princess Alexandra, Philip Merivale as Prince Albert, and Basil Rathbone as the tutor.

== See also ==
- List of American films of 1956
