= The Shock Punch =

1925 film by Paul Sloane

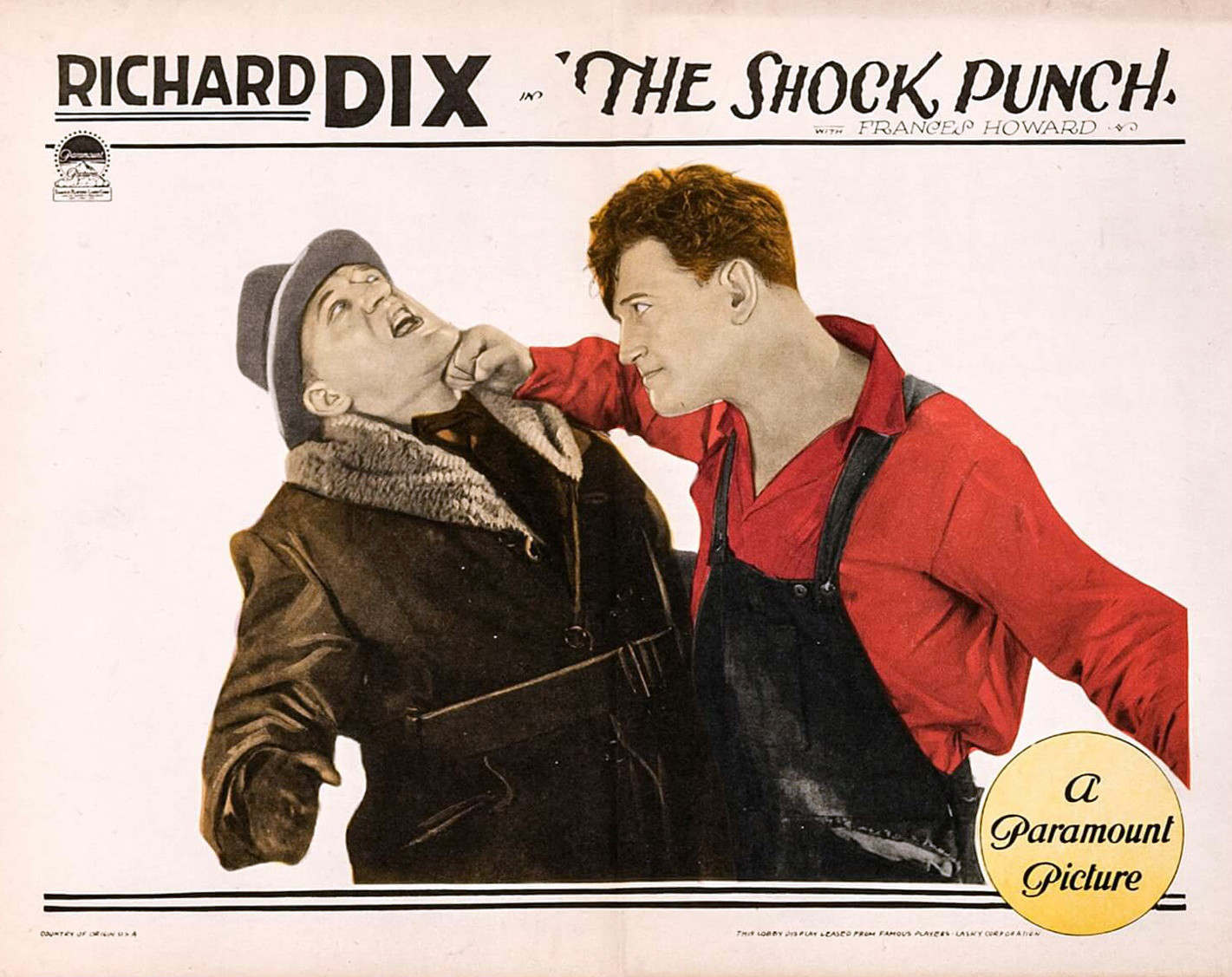
- Lobby card
- Directed by: Paul Sloane
- Written by: Luther Reed (scenario)
- Based on: The Shock Punch by John Monk Saunders
- Produced by: Adolph Zukor; Jesse L. Lasky
- Starring: Richard Dix
- Cinematography: William Miller
- Distributed by: Paramount Pictures
- Release date: February 25, 1925
- Running time: 60 minutes
- Country: United States
- Language: Silent (English intertitles)

The Shock Punch is a 1925 American silent boxing drama film produced by Famous Players–Lasky and distributed by Paramount Pictures. It starred Richard Dix and Frances Howard.

== Plot ==
Coming face-to-face with a couple of ruffians, champion boxer Terrence O'Rourke and construction worker Bull Mallarkey, the equally tough Randall Savage flattens each with a single punch.

Randall has a romantic interest in Dorothy Clark, whose father is erecting a new building. To get closer to her, Randall lands a job as a riveter. He then learns that not only is Bull Malarkey foreman of the crew, but is plotting to ruin Dorothy's father in business as well. Randall makes sure that does not happen.

== Cast ==
- Richard Dix as Randall Lee Savage
- Frances Howard as Dorothy Clark
- Theodore Babcock as Dan Savage
- Percy Moore as Jim Clark
- Charles Byer as Stanley Pierce (credited as Charles Beyer)
- Gunboat Smith as Terrence O'Rourke
- Jack Scannell as Mike
- Walter Long as Bull Malarkey
- Paul Panzer as Giuseppe
- Harry Cording as Construction Site Security Guard (uncredited)

== Preservation ==
A print of The Shock Punch is preserved at the Library of Congress.

== See also ==
- List of boxing films
