= BD Hotels =

American capsule hotel chain

BD Hotels builds, owns and operates capsule hotels. It owns and operates 24 hotels in New York City, including the Blakely Hotel, the Maritime, the Bowery, and the Jane hotels. The company also control 12 residential and commercial buildings.

BD Hotels specializes in buying renovations instead of new buildings to meet fewer competitors and lower purchase prices.

== History ==
BD Hotels was founded in 1986 by Richard Born and Ira Drukier who owned and managed The Pod hotel chain in New York. In the early 2000s, Born decided to develop hotels that carry small rooms but offer great location and style. The Pod51 opened in 2007 in the former Pickwick Arms Hotel. The second opened in the former men's club Allerton House on E. 39th St. BD Hotels purchased this building in 2010 for $28 million.

== Timeline ==
In 2008, the Chetrit Group started to push away BD Hotels from managing the Hotel Chelsea.

In 2012, BD Hotels ranked 11th on The Real Deal’s list last year of the biggest Manhattan hotel owners, managing 1,336 rooms across seven properties.

In 2013, BD Hotels announced its joint-venture with Raphael and Robert De Niro, Empire Global Ventures, Amerasia S&T Corp and Tribeca Enterprises to develop Project 179, an 850,000-square-foot complex in Shanghai’s financial district.

In May 2016, BD Hotels made a joint-venture with de Niro and Capco to turn the Covent Garden in London into an 83-room hotel, The Wellington Hotel, set to open in 2019. BD Hotels and de Niro share stakes in the Greenwich hotel.
