= The Swan (1925 film) =

1925 film directed by Dimitri Buchowetzki

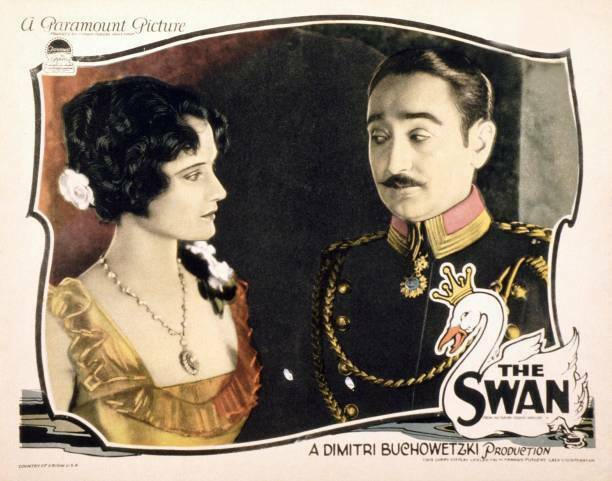
- Directed by: Dimitri Buchowetzki
- Written by: Melville Baker; Dimitri Buchowetzki
- Based on: The Swan (Á Hattyú Vigjatek Három Felvonasbarn); 1914 play by Ferenc Molnár
- Produced by: Adolph Zukor; Jesse L. Lasky
- Starring: Frances Howard; Adolphe Menjou; Ricardo Cortez
- Cinematography: Alvin Wyckoff
- Production company: Famous Players–Lasky
- Distributed by: Paramount Pictures
- Release date: February 16, 1925
- Running time: 6 reels (5,889 feet)
- Country: United States
- Languages: Silent; English intertitles

The Swan is a 1925 American silent comedy film directed by Dimitri Buchowetzki and starring Frances Howard, Adolphe Menjou and Ricardo Cortez. It was produced by Famous Players–Lasky and distributed by Paramount Pictures.

== Production background ==
The film is based on Melville Baker's 1923 Broadway play adaptation, The Swan, of Ferenc Molnar's play A Hattyu Vigjatek Harom Felvonasbarn.

This film was directed by Dimitri Buchowetzki, a recent Russian immigrant working for Famous Players–Lasky. Buchowetzki had directed pictures in Russia, Sweden, and Germany. The story of this film was remade in 1930 as One Romantic Night, an early talkie for Lillian Gish, and in Technicolor as a 1956 vehicle for Grace Kelly.

Full film

== Cast ==
- Frances Howard as Alexandra, The Swan
- Adolphe Menjou as Albert von Kersten-Rodenfels
- Ricardo Cortez as Dr. Walter, the Tutor
- Ida Waterman as Princess Beatrice
- Helen Lindroth as Amphirosa
- Helen Lee Worthing as Wanda von Gluck
- Joseph Depew as Prince George
- George Walcott as Prince Arsene
- Michael Visaroff as Father Hyacinth
- Michael Vavitch as Colonel Wunderlich
- Nicholas Soussanin as Lutzow
- Arthur Donaldson as Franz, the Court Chamberlain
- General Lodijensky as Master of the Hunt
- Clare Eames as Princess Dominica

== Preservation status ==
This silent version survives and can be found on home video and DVD.
