= One Romantic Night =

1930 film by Paul L. Stein

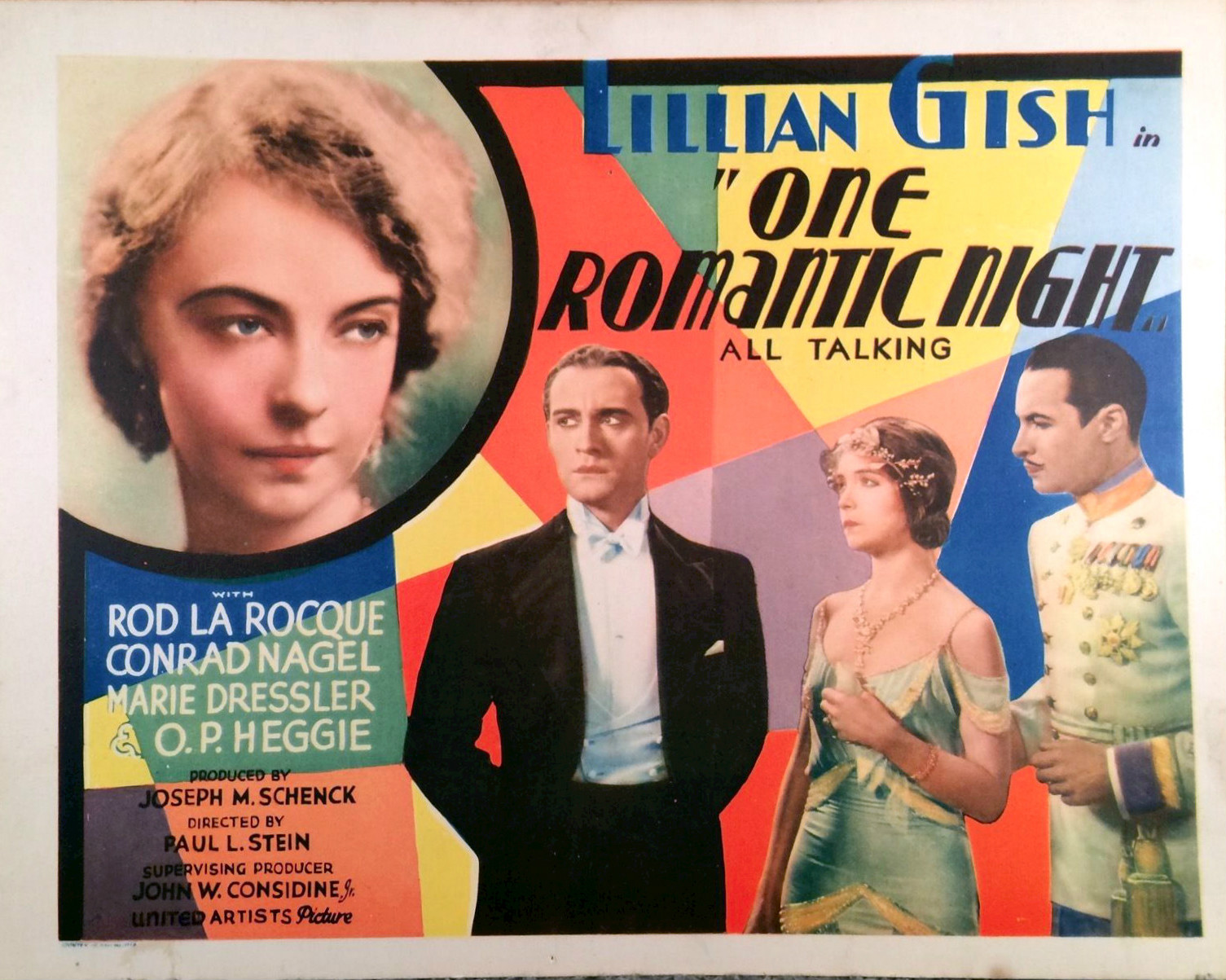
- Lobby card
- Directed by: Paul L. Stein
- Written by: Melville Baker (adaptation, screenplay); Maxwell Anderson (adaptation)
- Based on: The Swan by Ferenc Molnar
- Produced by: Joseph M. Schenck; John W. Considine Jr.
- Starring: Lillian Gish; Rod La Rocque
- Cinematography: Karl Struss
- Edited by: James Smith
- Music by: Hugo Riesenfeld
- Production company: Feature Productions
- Distributed by: United Artists
- Release date: May 3, 1930
- Running time: 73 minutes
- Country: United States
- Language: English

One Romantic Night is a 1930 American pre-Code romantic comedy film directed by Paul L. Stein. It is the first sound film version of Ferenc Molnár's play The Swan, and marked silent screen star Lillian Gish's talkie debut. She starred as Princess Alexandra, with Conrad Nagel as the tutor who falls in love with her, and Rod La Rocque as Crown Prince Albert. In this version, Alexandra and the Prince elope at the end. The film was only fairly successful, though Gish would go on to become as highly regarded in talking pictures as she had been in silent films.

A silent version of the play had been produced in 1925 at Paramount Pictures. The 1956 Eastmancolor film version of The Swan, the only one of the three film versions made in color, is much more frequently shown today.

== Plot ==
One Romantic Night (1930)

== Cast ==
- Lillian Gish as Princess Alexandra
- Rod La Rocque as Prince Albert
- Conrad Nagel as Dr Nicholas Haller
- Marie Dressler as Princess Beatrice
- O.P. Heggie as Father Benedict
- Albert Conti as Count Lutzen
- Edgar Norton as Colonel Wunderlich
- Billie Bennett as Princess Symphorosa
- Philippe De Lacy as Prince George
- Byron Sage as Prince Arsene
- Barbara Leonard as Mitzi

== See also ==
- Lillian Gish filmography
