= Melville Baker =

American screenwriter

- Born: April 24, 1901; Massachusetts, United States
- Died: April 10, 1958 (aged 56); Nice, France
- Occupation: Screenwriter

Melville Baker (April 24, 1901 – April 10, 1958) was an American screenwriter.

Bakers was born in Massachusetts and died of a heart attack in Nice, France at the age of 56.

== Selected filmography ==
- The Swan (1925)
- The Circus Kid (1928)
- Darkened Rooms (1929)
- One Romantic Night (1930)
- His Woman (1931)
- Zoo in Budapest (1933)
- Now and Forever (1934)
- The Gilded Lily (1935)
- Ladies in Love (1936)
- Above Suspicion (1943)

== See also ==
- Jack Kirkland
