= Goldwing =

Goldwing may refer to:

- Honda Gold Wing, a Japanese motorcycle
- Goldwing Ltd Goldwing, an American ultralight aircraft design
- American Goldwing, a 2011 album by Blitzen Trapper
- "Goldwing", a song by Billie Eilish from the album Happier Than Ever (2021)

== See also ==
- Goldwin (disambiguation)
