= Tony Goldwyn =

American actor and director (born 1960)

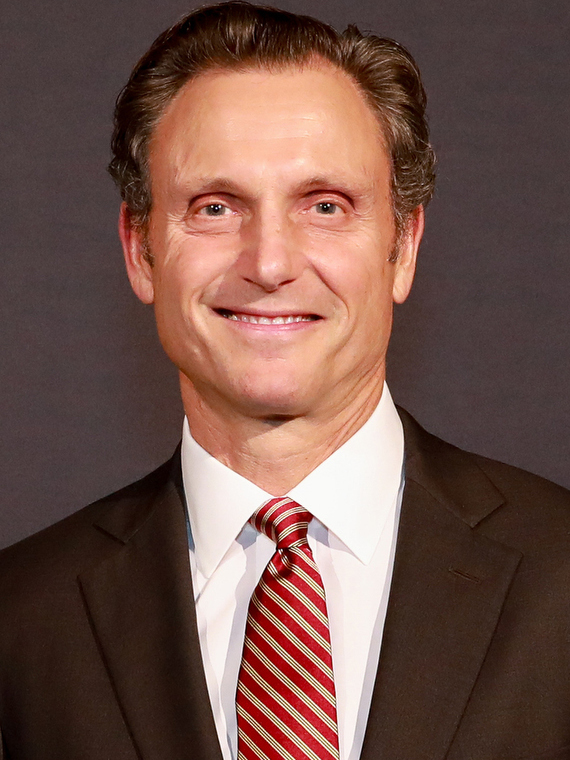
- Goldwyn in 2019
- Born: Anthony Howard Goldwyn; May 20, 1960 (age 66); Los Angeles, California, U.S.
- Education: Hamilton College; Brandeis University (BFA); London Academy of Music and Dramatic Art (MA)
- Occupations: Actor; director
- Years active: 1986–present
- Spouse: Jane Musky (m. 1987)
- Children: 2
- Parents: Samuel Goldwyn Jr.; Jennifer Howard
- Relatives: John Goldwyn (brother); Samuel Goldwyn (paternal grandfather); Frances Howard (paternal grandmother); Sidney Howard (maternal grandfather); Clare Eames (maternal grandmother); Liz Goldwyn (half-sister)

Anthony Howard Goldwyn (born May 20, 1960) is an American actor and director. He made his debut as Darren in the slasher film Friday the 13th Part VI: Jason Lives (1986) and had his breakthrough starring as Carl Bruner in the fantasy thriller film Ghost (1990), which earned him a nomination for the Saturn Award for Best Supporting Actor. He went on to portray Harold Nixon in the biographical film Nixon (1995), earning him a SAG Award nomination, and Neil Armstrong in the HBO miniseries From the Earth to the Moon (1998).

Goldwyn voiced the titular character in the Disney animated film Tarzan (1999). He portrayed Colonel Bagley in The Last Samurai (2003), Johnathon "John" Collingwood in the horror film The Last House on the Left (2009), Andrew Prior in the Divergent film series (2014–2015), and Paul Cohen in King Richard (2021), the latter netting him a second SAG Award nomination. He starred as President Fitzgerald Grant III on Scandal (2012–18) and also directed several episodes, for which he won a Peabody Award. Since 2024, he has starred as District Attorney Nicholas Baxter on Law & Order.

== Early life, family, and education ==
Goldwyn was born in Los Angeles, California, the son of actress Jennifer Howard and film producer Samuel Goldwyn Jr.. Goldwyn's paternal grandparents were film mogul Samuel Goldwyn, a Polish Jewish immigrant from Warsaw, and actress Frances Howard, who was originally from Nebraska. His maternal grandparents were playwright Sidney Howard and actress Clare Eames. One of his maternal great-great-grandfathers was Maryland governor and senator William T. Hamilton.

Goldwyn attended Hamilton College in Clinton, New York, Brandeis University in Waltham, Massachusetts (where he received his Bachelor of Fine Arts degree), and the London Academy of Music and Dramatic Art. He additionally studied acting at HB Studio in New York City.

== Career ==
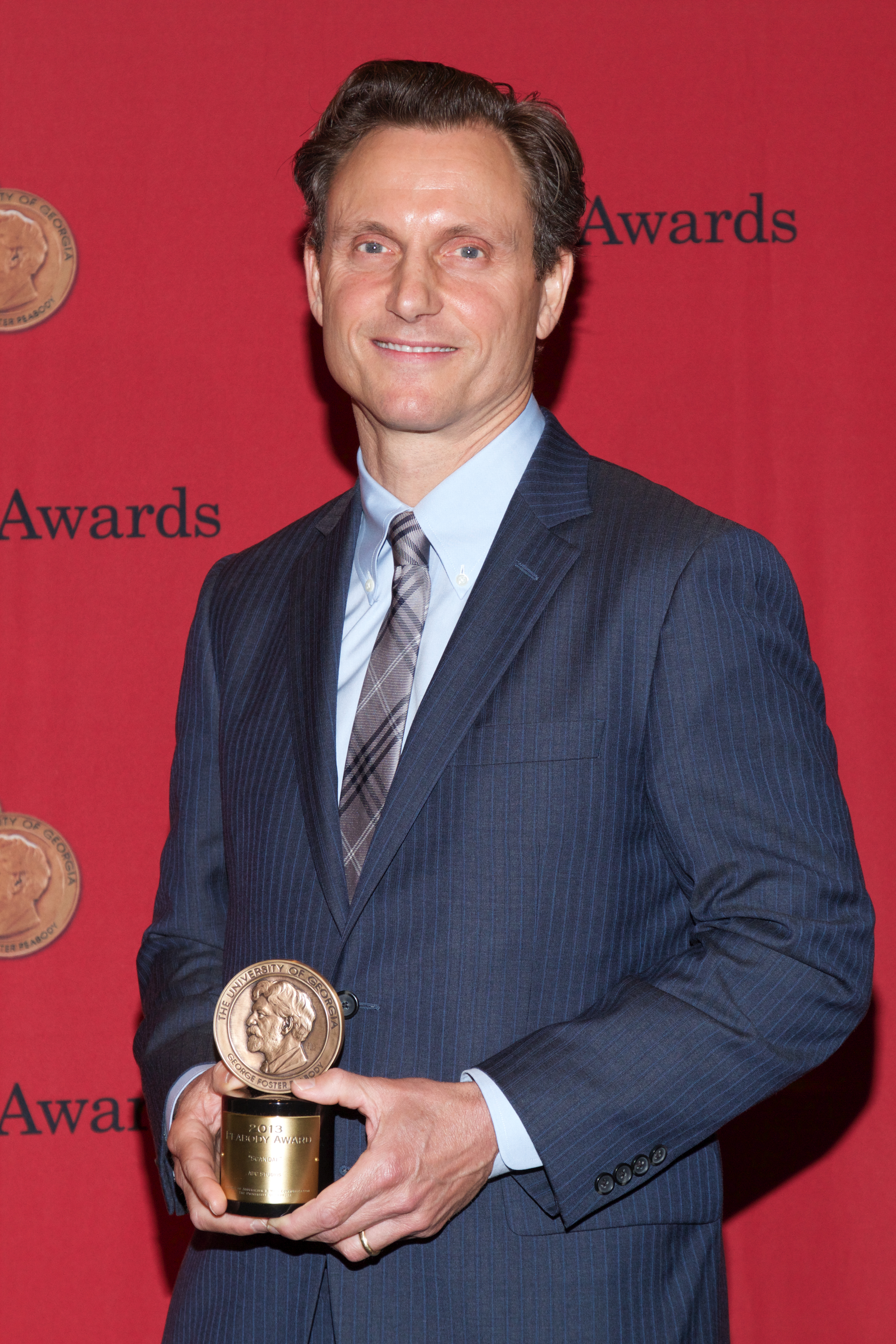
Goldwyn accepting a Peabody Award in 2013

Following his departure from drama school, Goldwyn began acting in guest star roles in the mid-1980s. He had his breakthrough role in playing Carl Bruner, friend-turned-betrayer of Patrick Swayze's character Sam Wheat, in the fantasy thriller Ghost. It was the highest grossing film of 1990 and the most rented videocassette of 1991. For his performance, Goldwyn was nominated for the Saturn Award for Best Supporting Actor. Goldwyn appeared in the comedy series Designing Women, in which he played a young interior designer named Kendall Dobbs, an HIV-positive man dying from AIDS who asked the women of Sugarbakers to design his funeral. In the HBO miniseries From the Earth to the Moon, Goldwyn played astronaut Neil Armstrong, commander of Apollo 11. He also voiced the title character in the 1999 animated feature film Tarzan, which was produced by Walt Disney Feature Animation and grossed over $400 million. He reprised the role in the video games Tarzan: Untamed and Kingdom Hearts.

Goldwyn had a recurring role on the NBC-Universal drama Law & Order: Criminal Intent as Frank Goren, brother of lead character Robert Goren, played by Vincent D'Onofrio. He also did acting and directing duties for the first season of Dexter for Showtime (brother John Goldwyn is executive producer). As a stage actor Goldwyn has appeared twice in Off-Broadway shows at Second Stage Theatre and on Broadway at Circle in the Square Theatre. At Second Stage Theatre he appeared in Theresa Rebeck's Spike Heels (1992) alongside Kevin Bacon and Julie White. In the summer of 2006 at Second Stage Theatre he starred opposite Kate Burton in another Rebeck play, The Water's Edge. Goldwyn played J. D. Sheldrake, the philandering business executive, in the Broadway musical Promises, Promises, starring Sean Hayes and Kristin Chenoweth. The cast recording was released on June 23, 2010, with Goldwyn on three tracks.

Goldwyn played Captain von Trapp (opposite Laura Osnes as Maria) in a concert performance of The Sound of Music at Carnegie Hall on April 25, 2012. The benefit included opera singer Stephanie Blythe as the Mother Abbess, Brooke Shields as Baroness Schraeder, and Patrick Page as Max. As a director, Goldwyn has done four feature films, A Walk on the Moon, Someone Like You, The Last Kiss, and Conviction. He has also directed many episodes of television series such as Without a Trace, The L Word, Dexter, Law & Order: Criminal Intent, Grey's Anatomy, and Scandal. In 2014, he directed the pilot episode of the WE tv series The Divide, for which he also served as executive producer along with Oscar-nominated screenwriter Richard LaGravenese. Goldwyn starred as President Fitzgerald Grant III in the ABC legal/political drama Scandal from 2012 to 2018. In 2013, Goldwyn was cast in the Lifetime original film Outlaw Prophet as Warren Jeffs. In 2014, he appeared in Divergent as Andrew Prior, Caleb (Ansel Elgort) and Tris' (Shailene Woodley) father. In 2015, he signed on to star in James Gunn's horror thriller film The Belko Experiment. In June 2018, Goldwyn was cast as Ben Lefevre in the Netflix supernatural series Chambers. On 20 January 2021, during the inauguration of Joe Biden, Goldwyn was the host of the Virtual Parade Across America aired on television networks, organized by the Biden Inaugural Committee. Also in 2021, Goldwyn appeared in King Richard, which was acclaimed and earned several accolades. In 2023, Goldwyn played Theodore Roosevelt in an Audible audiobook recording of the autobiography of Alice Roosevelt Longworth, and had a supporting role in Christopher Nolan's Oppenheimer. In 2024, Goldwyn joined the cast of Law & Order, portraying Manhattan District Attorney Nicholas Baxter.

== Personal life ==
Goldwyn has been married to Jane Michelle Musky, a production designer, since 1987. They have two daughters.

Goldwyn's brother John is a former executive of Paramount Pictures and the executive producer of Dexter. His brother Peter is also a film producer and the current President of Samuel Goldwyn Films. A former president of the Creative Coalition, Goldwyn is also heavily involved with arts advocacy. He is a spokesperson of the AmeriCares Foundation.

Goldwyn was an avid supporter of Hillary Clinton and in 2016 directed a commercial featuring his Scandal co-star Kerry Washington as well as Viola Davis, Ellen Pompeo, and Shonda Rhimes to support Clinton's presidential campaign. Goldwyn also serves as an ambassador for The Innocence Project, a non-profit organization that works to exonerate the wrongfully convicted and reform the criminal justice system, and on the Board of Governors for the Motion Picture & Television Fund (MPTF).

== Filmography ==
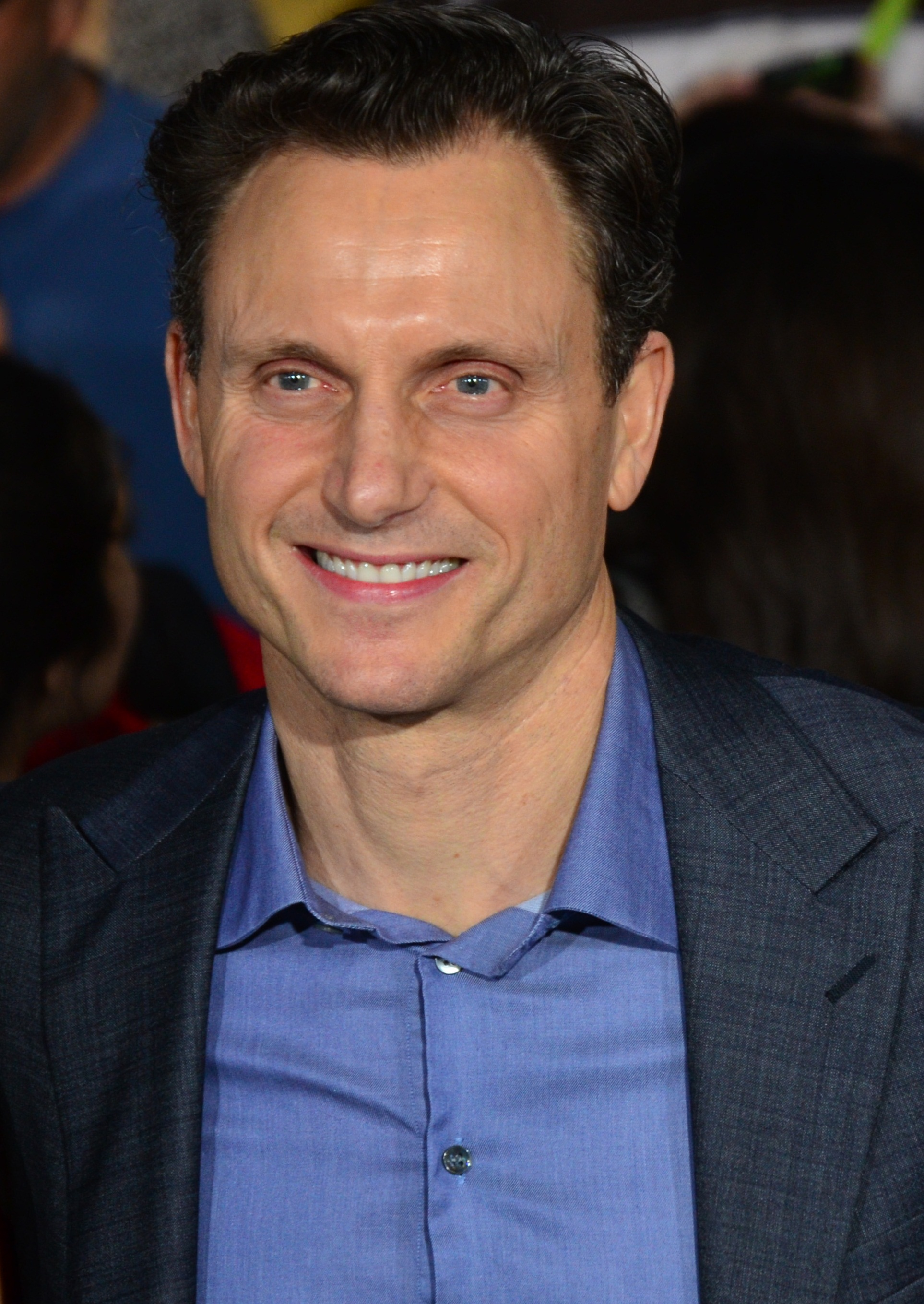
Goldwyn at the film premiere of Divergent in March 2014

=== Film ===
Year	Title	Role	Notes
1986	Friday the 13th Part VI: Jason Lives	Darren	
1987	Gaby: A True Story	David	
1990	Ghost	Carl Bruner	
1992	Kuffs	Ted Bukovsky	
1992	Traces of Red	Steve Frayn	
1993	The Pelican Brief	Fletcher Coal	
1993	Taking the Heat	Michael Norell	
1994	The Last Tattoo	Capt. Michael Starwood	
1995	The Last Word	Stan	
1995	Nixon	Harold Nixon	
1995	Reckless	Tom Fitzsimons	
1995	Pocahontas: The Legend	Sir Edwin Wingfield	
1996	The Substance of Fire	Aaron Geldhart	
1997	Trouble on the Corner	Jeff Stewart	
1997	Kiss the Girls	Dr. William "Will" Rudolph	
1998	The Lesser Evil	Frank O'Brian	
1999	Tarzan	Tarzan	Voice
2000	The 6th Day	Michael Drucker	
2000	Bounce	Greg Janello	
2001	An American Rhapsody	Peter Sandor	
2002	Abandon	Dr. David Schaffer	
2002	Joshua	Joshua	
2003	The Last Samurai	Colonel Bagley	
2003	Ash Tuesday	Elliott	
2005	The Godfather of Green Bay	Big Jake Norquist	
2005	American Gun	Frank	
2005	Romance and Cigarettes	Kitty's First Love	Uncredited
2005	The Sisters	Vincent Antonelli	
2005	Ghosts Never Sleep	Jared Dolan	
2009	PoliWood	Himself	Documentary
2009	The Last House on the Left	John Collingwood	
2011	The Mechanic	Dean Sanderson	
2014	Divergent	Andrew Prior	
2015	The Divergent Series: Insurgent	Andrew Prior	
2016	The Belko Experiment	Barry Norris	
2017	All I Wish	Adam	
2017	Mark Felt: The Man Who Brought Down the White House	Ed Miller	
2021	King Richard	Paul Cohen	
2022	The People We Hate at the Wedding	Dr. Goulding	
2023	Plane	Scarsdale	
2023	Murder Mystery 2	Silverfox	
2023	Oppenheimer	Gordon Gray	
2023	Ezra	Bruce	Also director and producer
2025	One Battle After Another	Virgil Throckmorton	
TBA	Billion Dollar Spy	Burton Gerber	Post-production

=== Television ===
Year	Title	Role	Notes
1987	St. Elsewhere	Henry	Episode: "Schwarzwald"
1987	Matlock	Dr. Mark Campion	Episode: "The Doctors"
1987	CBS Summer Playhouse	Paul	Episode: "Mabel and Max"
1987	Designing Women	Kendall	Episode: "Killing All the Right People"
1988	L.A. Law	Chris Arnett	Episode: "Fetus Completus"
1988	Hunter	Byron	Episode: "Murder He Wrote"
1988	Favorite Son	Tim	Miniseries
1988	Murphy Brown	Bobby Powell	Episode: "Respect"
1989	Dark Holiday	Ken Horton	Television film
1991	Tales from the Crypt	Dr. Carl Fairbanks	Episode: "Abra Cadaver"
1991	L'Amérique en otage	Jody Powell	Television film
1992	The Last Mile	Scott	Short
1993	Taking the Heat	Michael	Television film
1993	Love Matters	Geoffrey	Television film
1994	Doomsday Gun	Donald Duvall	Television film
1995	Under Fire	James Warren	Pilot
1995	A Woman of Independent Means	Robert Steed	Miniseries
1995	Truman	Clark Clifford	Television film
1996	The Boys Next Door	Jack Palmer	Television film
1997	The Song of the Lark	Fred Ottenburg	Short
1998	From the Earth to the Moon	Neil Armstrong	Miniseries
2001	Frasier	Roger	Episode: "Love Stinks"
2001	American Masters	Himself	Episode: "Goldwyn The Man and His Movies"
2004–2005	The L Word	Burr Connor	2 episodes
2004	Without a Trace	Greg Knowles / Rick Knowles	2 episodes
2006	Dexter	Dr. Emmett Meridian	Episode: "Shrink Wrap"
2007–2008	Law & Order: Criminal Intent	Frank Goren	4 episodes
2009	The Good Wife	Judge Henry Baxter	Episode: "Lifeguard"
2011	Drop Dead Diva	Alan Roberts	Episode: "Closure"
2012	The Unknown	Bill Watson	Episode: "Spare the Child"
2012–2018	Scandal	President Fitzgerald Grant III	Main role
2014	Outlaw Prophet	Warren Jeffs	Television film
2016	Full Frontal with Samantha Bee	Bus Driver	Episode: "Special: Full Frontal Election Documentary"
2019	Chambers	Ben Lefevre	Main role
2019	Blue Sky Metropolis	Narrator	Miniseries
2020	Lovecraft Country	Samuel Braithwhite	Episode: "Whitey's on the Moon"
2021	The Hot Zone: Anthrax	Bruce Edwards Ivins	6 episodes
2024–2025	Hacks	Bob Lipka	4 episodes
2024–present	Law & Order	DA Nicholas Baxter	Main role (seasons 23–present)
2025	Law & Order: Special Victims Unit	DA Nicholas Baxter	4 episodes

=== Video games ===
Year	Title	Voice role
1999	Tarzan	Tarzan
2001	Tarzan: Untamed	Tarzan
2002	Kingdom Hearts	Tarzan

=== Director ===
Year	Title	Notes
1999	A Walk on the Moon	Also producer
2001	Someone like You	
2004	Without a Trace	Episode: "American Goddess"
2004–2005	The L Word	3 episodes
2006	Grey's Anatomy	2 episodes: Episode: "Winning a Battle, Losing the War" (S01 E03) and "Damage Case" (S02 E24)
2006	The Last Kiss	
2006	Law & Order	Episode: "Thinking Makes It So"
2006–2007	Dexter	4 episodes
2007	Private Practice	Episode: "In Which Sam Receives an Unexpected Visitor..."
2007	Six Degrees	Episode: "Ray's Back"
2007	Kidnapped	Episode: "Acknowledgement"
2007	Alibi	
2007	Dirty Sexy Money	Episode: "The Nutcracker"
2010	Conviction	Also producer
2010	Damages	Episode: "Flight's at 11:08"
2010–2012	Justified	3 episodes
2011	Hawthorne	Episode: "To Tell the Truth"
2012–2018	Scandal	9 episodes
2014	The Divide	2 episodes, also executive producer
2019	Chambers	Episode: "In the Gloaming"
2023	Ezra	Also producer

=== Audiobook ===
Year	Title	Author
1991	The Grifters	Jim Thompson
1992	Tenth Commandment	Lawrence Sanders
2000	Dead Irish (Dismas Hardy Series #1)	John Lescroart
2005	The Millionaires	Brad Meltzer
2007	The Devil in the White City	Erik Larson
2007	A Death in Vienna	Daniel Silva
2007	Kate Remembered	A. Scott Berg
2008	Thunderstruck	Erik Larson
2023	Crowded Hours: The True Story of Alice Roosevelt and America’s First Political Dynasty	Alice Roosevelt Longworth

=== Stage ===
Year	Title	Role	Theatre
1988	Tom Jones	Tom Jones	
1989	The Sum of Us	Jeff	
1990	Carthaginians	Hark	
1991	Picnic	Hal Carter	
1992	Spike Heels	Andrew	Second Stage Theater
1994	Lady in the Dark	Charley Johnson	New York City Center
1995–1996	Holiday	Johnny Case	Circle in the Square Theatre
2006	The Water's Edge	Richard	Second Stage Theater
2010–2011	Promises, Promises	J. D. Sheldrake	Broadway Theatre
2010	24 Hour Plays Broadway	Performer	
2010	Broadway Backwards 5	Performer	
2012	The Sound of Music	Captain von Trapp	Carnegie Hall
2018	Network	Max Schumacher	Belasco Theatre
2020	The Inheritance	Henry Wilcox	Ethel Barrymore Theatre

== Discography ==
Year	Title	Album	Notes
2010	"Wanting Things"	Promises, Promises	
2010	"Christmas Day"	Promises, Promises	feat. Ashley Amber
2010	"It's Our Little Secret"	Promises, Promises	feat. Sean Hayes

== Awards and nominations ==
Year	Award	Category	Nominated work	Result
1991	Saturn Awards	Best Supporting Actor	Ghost	Nominated
1996	Screen Actors Guild Awards	Outstanding Performance by a Cast in a Motion Picture	Nixon	Nominated
2010	Philadelphia Film Festival	Philadelphia Film Festival for Audience Award — Honorable Mention	Conviction	Won
2013	Peabody Awards	Excellence in Radio and Television	Scandal	Won
2014	Prism Awards	Performance in a Drama Series	Scandal	Nominated
2022	Black Reel Awards	Outstanding Ensemble	King Richard	Nominated
2022	Hollywood Critics Association Awards	Best Cast Ensemble	King Richard	Nominated
2022	NAACP Image Awards	Outstanding Ensemble Cast in a Motion Picture	King Richard	Nominated
2022	Screen Actors Guild Awards	Outstanding Performance by a Cast in a Motion Picture	King Richard	Nominated
