= Samuel Goldwyn Jr. =

American film producer (1926–2015)

- Goldwyn in 2013
- Born: Samuel John Goldwyn Jr. September 7, 1926; Los Angeles, California, U.S.
- Died: January 9, 2015 (aged 88); Cedars-Sinai Medical Center, Los Angeles, California, U.S.
- Occupation: Producer
- Years active: 1948–2015
- Spouses: Jennifer Howard (m. 1950; div. 1968) Peggy Elliott (m. 1969; div. 2005) Patricia Strawn (m. 2010)
- Children: 6, including Tony, John, and Liz Goldwyn
- Parent(s): Frances Howard; Samuel Goldwyn

Samuel John Goldwyn Jr. (September 7, 1926 – January 9, 2015) was an American film producer.

== Early life ==
Samuel Goldwyn Jr. was born on September 7, 1926, in Los Angeles, California, the son of actress Frances Howard (1903–1976) and the pioneer motion picture mogul Samuel Goldwyn (1882–1974). He attended Fountain Valley School in Colorado Springs, Colorado, and the University of Virginia. His father was Jewish and his mother was Catholic; he was raised Catholic at his mother’s insistence.

== Career ==
After serving in the United States Army during World War II, he worked as a theatrical producer in London and for Edward R. Murrow at CBS in New York. He then followed in his father's footsteps and founded the motion picture production companies Formosa Productions, The Samuel Goldwyn Company, and Samuel Goldwyn Films.

In 1950, Goldwyn married actor Jennifer Howard (1925–1993), the daughter of prominent author and screenwriter Sidney Howard. The couple had four children, including actor Tony Goldwyn and studio executive John Goldwyn. They divorced in 1968, and he then married Peggy Elliot, with whom he had two children, including Liz Goldwyn. His second marriage also ended in divorce. At the time of his death, he was married to his third wife, Patricia Strawn.

== Death ==
Goldwyn died of congestive heart failure on January 9, 2015, at Cedars-Sinai Medical Center in Los Angeles, California, at the age of 88.

== Partial filmography ==
He was a producer in all films unless otherwise noted.

=== Film ===
Year	Film	Credit	Notes
1948	Good-Time Girl	Associate producer	
1955	Man with the Gun		
1956	The Sharkfighters		
1958	The Proud Rebel		
1960	The Adventures of Huckleberry Finn		
1964	The Young Lovers	Director	
1970	Cotton Comes to Harlem		
1972	Come Back, Charleston Blue		
1979	The Visitor	Executive producer	Uncredited
1983	The Golden Seal		
1985	Once Bitten	Executive producer	
1987	A Prayer for the Dying		Uncredited
1987	Fatal Beauty	Executive producer	Uncredited
1988	Mystic Pizza	Executive producer	
1990	Stella		
1991	Rock-a-Doodle	Executive producer	
1993	The Program		
1996	The Preacher's Wife		
1997	Ovosodo	Executive producer	
1998	Viola Kisses Everybody	Executive producer	
2001	Tortilla Soup	Executive producer	
2003	Master and Commander: The Far Side of the World		
2013	The Secret Life of Walter Mitty		Final film as a producer

Miscellaneous crew

Year	Film	Role
1952	A Killer Walks	Presenter: Original play
1955	Man with the Gun	Presenter
1958	The Proud Rebel	Presenter

As director

Year	Film
1964	The Young Lovers

Thanks

Year	Film	Role
1997	Welcome to Woop Woop	Special thanks
2016	Who's Driving Doug	The producers wish to thank

=== Television ===
Year	Title	Credit	Notes
1956	Sneak Preview		
1967	Off to See the Wizard		
1987	59th Academy Awards		Television special
1988	60th Academy Awards		Television special
1988	April Morning	Executive producer	Television film
1996–97	Flipper	Executive producer	
