= Samuel Goldwyn =

Polish–American film producer (1882–1974)

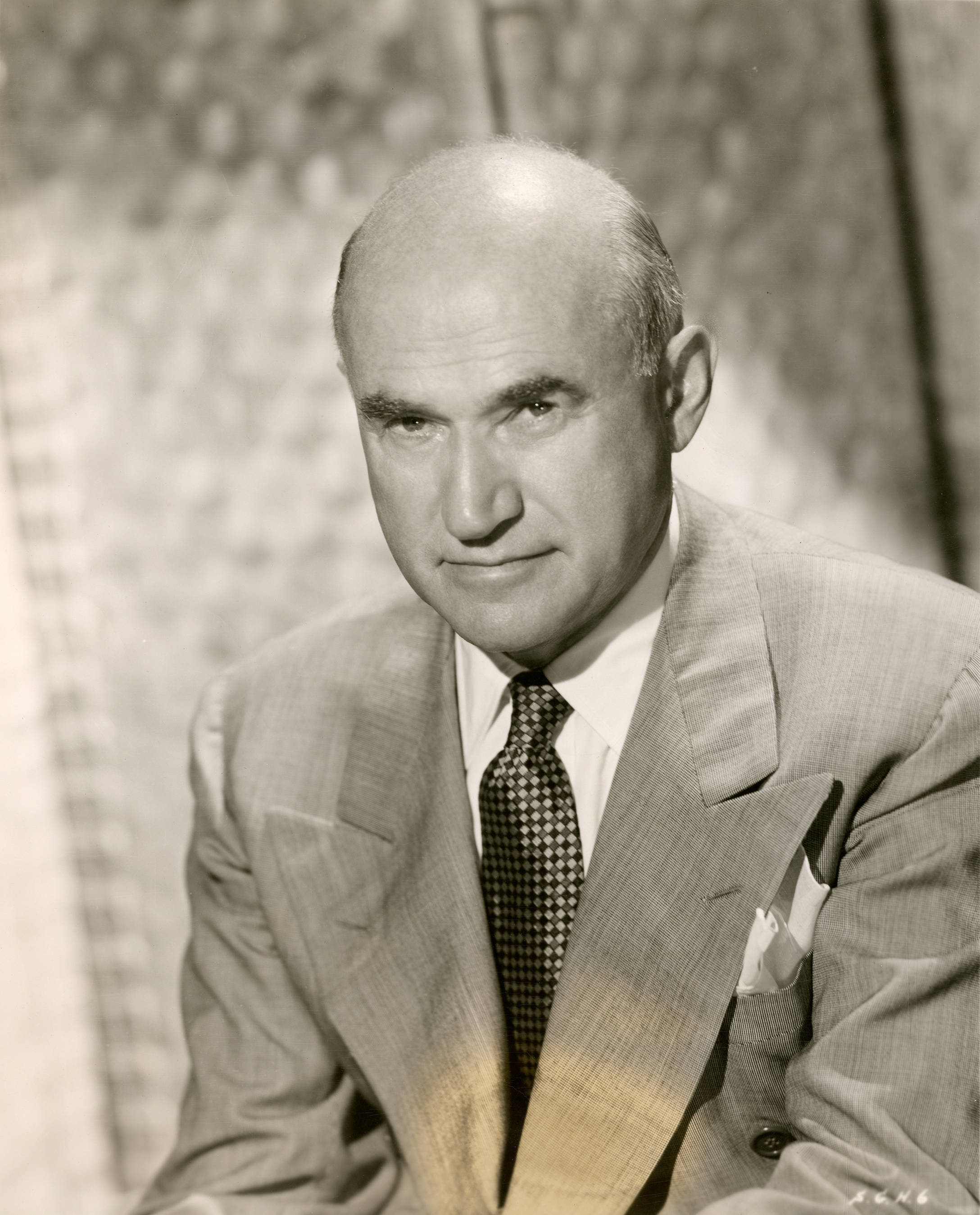
- Goldwyn in 1949
- Born: Szmuel Gelbfisz; July 1879 (Note: Goldwyn was likely born on July 1879, although he claimed his birthday to be August 27, 1882.) or August 1882; Warsaw, Congress Poland, Russian Empire
- Died: January 31, 1974 (aged 94); Los Angeles, California, U.S.
- Resting place: Forest Lawn Memorial Park, Glendale, California, U.S.
- Other name: Samuel Goldfish
- Years active: 1917–1959
- Spouses: Blanche Lasky (m. 1910; div. 1915); Frances Howard (m. 1925)
- Children: 2, including Samuel Jr.
- Relatives: Tony Goldwyn (grandson); John Goldwyn (grandson); Liz Goldwyn (granddaughter)

Signature
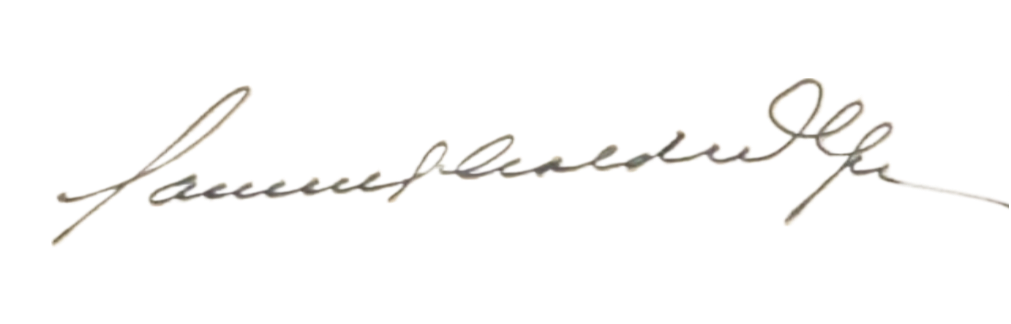

Samuel Goldwyn (/ˈɡoʊldwɪn/ GOHLD-win; born Szmuel Gelbfisz; Yiddish: שמואל געלבפֿיש; July 1879 or 1882 – January 31, 1974) was a Polish-born American film producer and pioneer in the American film industry, who produced the United States's first major motion picture. He was best known for being the founding contributor and executive of several motion picture studios. He was awarded the Golden Globe Cecil B. DeMille Award (1973), the Irving G. Thalberg Memorial Award (1947), and the Jean Hersholt Humanitarian Award (1958).

== Early life ==
Goldwyn was born as Szmuel Gelbfisz in Warsaw to Polish Jewish parents, Aaron Dawid Gelbfisz, a peddler, and Hanna Frymet (née Fiszhaut). He was likely born in July 1879, although he claimed his birthday to be August 27, 1882; at the time, it was not uncommon for Jews to fabricate their ages to prevent future conscription for the Imperial Russian Army.

He left Congress Poland penniless after his father's death and made his way from Warsaw to Hamburg. There he stayed with acquaintances of his family where he trained as a glove maker. On November 26, 1898, Gelbfisz left Hamburg for Birmingham, England, where he remained with relatives for six weeks under the name Samuel Goldfish. On January 4, 1899, he sailed from Liverpool, arrived in Philadelphia on January 19, and went to New York. He found work upstate in Gloversville, New York, in the bustling glove business. Soon, his marketing skills made him a very successful salesman at the Elite Glove Company. After four years as vice-president of sales, he moved to New York City and settled at 10 West 61st Street.

== Paramount ==
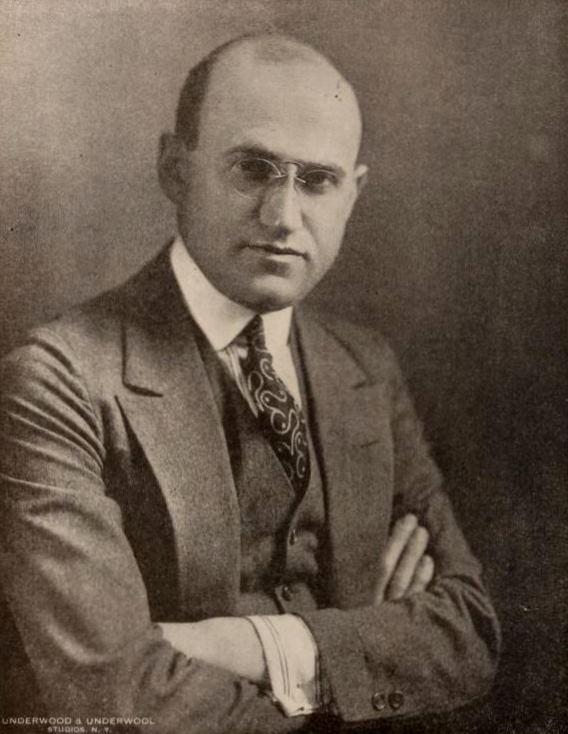
Goldwyn in 1919

In 1913, Goldwyn, along with his brother-in-law Jesse L. Lasky, Cecil B. DeMille, and Arthur Friend formed a partnership, The Jesse L. Lasky Feature Play Company, to produce feature-length motion pictures. Film rights for a stage play, The Squaw Man, were purchased for $4,000 and Dustin Farnum was hired for the leading role. Shooting for the first feature film made in Hollywood began on December 29, 1913.

In 1914, Paramount was a film exchange and exhibition corporation headed by W. W. Hodkinson. Looking for more movies to distribute, Paramount signed a contract with the Lasky Company on 1 June 1914 to supply 36 films per year. One of Paramount's other suppliers was Adolph Zukor's Famous Players Company. The two companies merged on 28 June 1916, forming the Famous Players–Lasky Corporation. Zukor had been quietly buying Paramount stock, and two weeks before the merger, became president of Paramount Pictures Corporation and had Hodkinson replaced with Hiram Abrams, a Zukor associate.

With the merger, Zukor became president of Paramount and Famous Players–Lasky, Goldwyn was named chairman of the board of Famous Players–Lasky, and Jesse Lasky was the first vice-president. After a series of conflicts with Zukor, Goldwyn resigned as chairman, and as a member of the executive committee on September 14, 1916. Goldwyn was no longer an active member of management, although he still owned stock and was a member of the board of directors. Famous Players–Lasky later became part of Paramount Pictures Corporation, and Paramount became one of Hollywood's major studios.

== Goldwyn Pictures ==
In 1916, Goldwyn partnered with Broadway producers Edgar and Archibald Selwyn, using a combination of both names to call their film-making enterprise Goldwyn Pictures. Seeing an opportunity, he had his name legally changed to Samuel Goldwyn in December 1918 and used this name for the rest of his life. Goldwyn Pictures proved successful, but it is their "Leo the Lion" trademark for which the company is remembered today.

After personality clashes, Samuel Goldwyn left the company in 1922. Frank Godsol became chairman of the board and President of Goldwyn Pictures in 1922. On April 10, 1924, Goldwyn Pictures was acquired by Marcus Loew and merged into his Metro Pictures Corporation, becoming Metro-Goldwyn-Mayer. Despite including his name, Samuel Goldwyn was never connected with ownership, management, or production at Metro-Goldwyn-Mayer.

== Samuel Goldwyn Productions ==
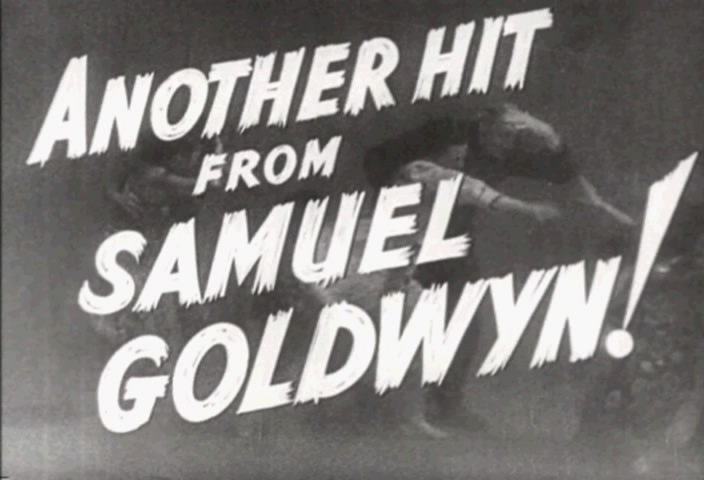
From the trailer for The Hurricane (1937)

Before the sale and merger of Goldwyn Pictures in April 1924, Goldwyn had established Samuel Goldwyn Productions in 1923 as a production-only operation (with no distribution arm). Their first feature was Potash and Perlmutter, released in September 1923 through First National Pictures. Some of the early productions bear the name "Howard Productions", named for Goldwyn's wife, Frances.

For 35 years, Goldwyn built a reputation in filmmaking and developed an eye for finding the talent for making films. William Wyler directed many of his most celebrated productions, and he hired writers such as Ben Hecht, Sidney Howard, Dorothy Parker, and Lillian Hellman. (According to legend, at a heated story conference, Goldwyn scolded someone—in most accounts, Mrs. Parker, who recalled he had once been a glove maker—who responded to him, "Don't you point that finger at me. I knew it when it had a thimble on it!")

Goldwyn made numerous films during that time and reigned as Hollywood's most successful independent producer. Many of his films were forgettable; his collaboration with John Ford, however, resulted in a Best Picture Oscar nomination for Arrowsmith (1931). Goldwyn and Ford had another successful collaboration six years later with The Hurricane (1937). William Wyler was responsible for most of Goldwyn's highly lauded films, with Best Picture Oscar nominations for Dodsworth (1936), Dead End (1937), Wuthering Heights (1939), The Little Foxes (1941) and The Best Years of Our Lives (1946). Leading actors in several Goldwyn films, especially those directed by Wyler, were also Oscar-nominated for their performances. Throughout the 1930s, Goldwyn released all his films through United Artists; beginning in 1941 and continuing nearly to the end of his career, Goldwyn's films were distributed by RKO Pictures.

== Oscar triumph and later years ==
In 1946, the year he was honored by the Academy of Motion Picture Arts and Sciences with the Irving G. Thalberg Memorial Award, Goldwyn's drama, The Best Years of Our Lives, starring Myrna Loy, Fredric March, Teresa Wright and Dana Andrews, won the Academy Award for Best Picture. In the 1950s, Samuel Goldwyn turned to make several musicals including Hans Christian Andersen (1952), his last with Danny Kaye, with whom he had made many others, and Guys and Dolls (1955) starring Marlon Brando, Jean Simmons, Frank Sinatra, and Vivian Blaine, which was based on the successful Broadway musical. This was the only independent film that Goldwyn released through MGM.

In his final film, Samuel Goldwyn brought together Black actors Sidney Poitier, Dorothy Dandridge, Sammy Davis Jr. and Pearl Bailey in a film rendition of the George Gershwin opera, Porgy and Bess (1959). Released by Columbia Pictures, the film was nominated for three Oscars but won only one for Best Original Score. It was also a critical and financial failure, and the Gershwin family reportedly disliked the film and eventually pulled it from distribution. The film turned the opera into an operetta with spoken dialogue in between the musical numbers. Its reception was a major disappointment for Goldwyn, who, according to biographer Arthur Marx, saw it as his crowning glory and had wanted to film Porgy and Bess since he first saw it onstage in 1935.

Goldwyn's house at 1200 Laurel Lane in Beverly Hills was completed in 1934, designed by Douglas Honnold and George Vernon Russell. The Goldwyns hosted frequent social events at the house.

In May 1951 he was named chairman of the California branch of the Committee on the Present Danger.

== Awards ==
- In 1957, Goldwyn was awarded the Jean Hersholt Humanitarian Award for his outstanding contributions to humanitarian causes.
- On March 27, 1971, Goldwyn was presented with the Presidential Medal of Freedom by President Richard Nixon.

== Marriages ==
In 1910, Goldwyn married Blanche Lasky, a sister of Jesse L. Lasky. The marriage produced a daughter, Ruth Goldfish Coates, who was born in 1912. The couple divorced in 1915. In 1925, he married actress Frances Howard, to whom he remained married for the rest of his life. Their son, Samuel Goldwyn Jr., eventually joined his father in the business.

Despite his marriages, Samuel Goldwyn was known as a ladies' man in social circles. Goldwyn Girl Jean Howard was quoted saying, "Sam Goldwyn was not a fellow to make a pass in public; he had too much taste for that," but his dalliances were many, even as his wife Frances Howard turned a blind eye.

== Death ==
Goldwyn died of heart failure at his home in Los Angeles in 1974. In the 1980s, the Samuel Goldwyn Studio was sold to Warner Bros. Pictures. There is a theater named after him in Beverly Hills and he received a star on the Hollywood Walk of Fame at 1631 Vine Street for his contributions to motion pictures on February 8, 1960.

== Descendants and relations ==
=== Grandchildren ===
Samuel Goldwyn's grandchildren include:

- Francis Goldwyn, founder of the Manhattan Toy Company and managing member of Quorum Associates
- Tony Goldwyn, actor, producer, and director, best known for starring as President Fitzgerald Grant III in the TV series Scandal
- John Goldwyn, film producer
- Peter Goldwyn, the current president of Samuel Goldwyn Films
- Catherine Goldwyn, creator of Sound Art, a non-profit that teaches popular music all over Los Angeles
- Liz Goldwyn, with a film on HBO called Pretty Things, featuring interviews with queens from the heyday of American burlesque; her book, an extension of the documentary titled Pretty Things: The Last Generation of American Burlesque Queens, was published in 2006 by HarperCollins
- Rebecca Goldwyn (August 15, 1955 – September 1, 1955)

=== Nephew ===
Goldwyn's relatives include Fred Lebensold, an award-winning architect (best known as the designer of multiple concert halls in Canada and the United States). Fred was the son of Manya Lebensold, Sam's younger sister, who was murdered in the Holocaust, despite the best efforts of her brothers Sam and Ben in 1939–40 to extricate her from the Warsaw Ghetto.

== The Samuel Goldwyn Foundation ==
Samuel Goldwyn's will created a multimillion-dollar charitable foundation in his name. Among other endeavors, the Samuel Goldwyn Foundation funds the Samuel Goldwyn Writing Awards, provides construction funds for the Frances Howard Goldwyn Hollywood Regional Library, and provides ongoing funding for the Motion Picture & Television Country House and Hospital.

== The Samuel Goldwyn Company ==
Several years after the senior Goldwyn's death, his son, Samuel Jr., initiated an independent film and television distribution company dedicated to preserving the integrity of Goldwyn's ambitions and work. The company's assets were later acquired by Orion Pictures, and in 1997, passed on to Orion's parent company, Metro-Goldwyn-Mayer. Several years later, the Samuel Goldwyn Jr. Family Trust and Warner Bros. acquired the rights to all the Goldwyn-produced films except The Hurricane, which was returned to the MGM subsidiary United Artists.

== Goldwynisms ==
Goldwyn was also known for his malapropisms, paradoxes, and other speech errors called 'Goldwynisms' ("a humorous statement or phrase resulting from the use of incongruous or contradictory words, situations, idioms, etc."). For example, he was reported to have said, "I don't think anybody should write his autobiography until after he's dead." and "Include me out." However, Goldwynisms were the inventions of humorists and newspaper editors. While Goldwyn was entertained by the misquotations at first, he eventually became irritated by the cumulative depiction of himself as a man who frequently misspoke. Many famous "Goldwynisms" predate Goldwyn's career as circulated witticism.

For example, the statement attributed to Goldwyn that "a verbal contract isn't worth the paper it's written on" is a misreporting of someone else's quote praising the trustworthiness of a colleague: "His verbal contract is worth more than the paper it's written on". The identity of the colleague is variously reported as Joseph M. Schenck or Joseph L. Mankiewicz. Goldwyn himself was reportedly aware of—and pleased by—the misattribution.

Upon being told that a book he had purchased for filming, The Well of Loneliness, couldn't be filmed because it was about lesbians, he reportedly replied: "That's all right, we'll make them Hungarians." The same story was told about the 1934 rights to The Children's Hour with the response "That's okay; we'll turn them into Armenians."

In the Grateful Dead's song "Scarlet Begonias", the line "I ain't often right, but I've never been wrong" appears in the bridge. This is similar to Goldwyn's "I'm willing to admit that I may not always be right, but I am never wrong."
