= Jeff Klein (hotelier) =

American hotelier (born 1970)

- Born: Jeffrey Michael Klein; April 24, 1970 (age 56); New York City, New York, U.S.
- Education: Tulane University
- Spouse: John Goldwyn (m. 2011)

Jeffrey Michael Klein (born April 24, 1970) is an American hotelier, restaurateur, and founder of the JK Hotel Group.

== Early life ==
Born in New York City, Klein spent his childhood in the city's Upper East Side neighborhood. He graduated from Columbia Grammar and Preparatory School before attending Tulane University in New Orleans, Louisiana. During his time at Tulane, he also studied abroad in Paris, France. In 1993, Klein graduated from Tulane University with a Bachelor of Arts degree in French literature.

== Career ==
After graduating from Tulane University Klein returned to New York City and got his first job in hospitality, as a bellman at the Gotham Hospitality Group’s The Franklin Hotel. He went on to fill various positions within the hotels, including sales manager, housekeeping manager, front desk manager and eventually, general manager of The Mansfield Hotel in 1998. He spent five years working with the Gotham Hospitality Group and its founder, Bernard Goldberg, and CEO, Stephen Brighenti, who later became mentors to Klein.

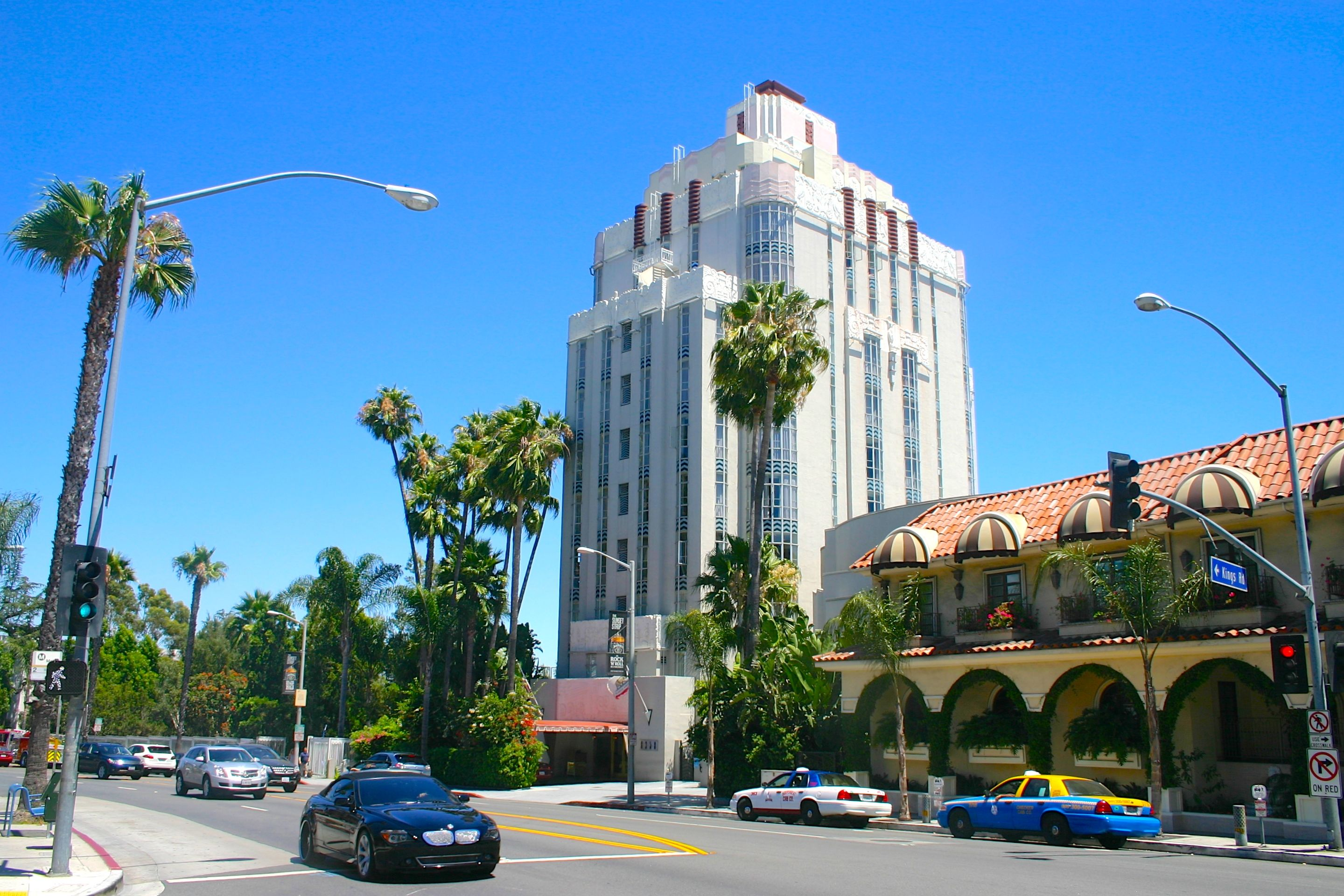
Sunset Tower Hotel in West Hollywood

In 1998 Goldberg sold the Gotham Hospitality Group and embarked on a project with Klein to convert a midtown office building into the City Club Hotel.

In 2004 Klein purchased the Sunset Tower Hotel in West Hollywood. Designed in 1929 by Leland A. Bryant, the building was a landmark from its debut. In 2005 Klein opened the Tower Bar and Restaurant, housed in Bugsy Siegel’s old apartment on the property. He recruited Dimitri Dimitrov as the Tower Bar maître d’ following an introduction from mutual friend Tom Ford. Under Klein’s ownership, the hotel hosted the annual Vanity Fair Oscar Party from 2009 to 2013, as a multiple Condé Nast Traveler Gold List recipient, a Condé Nast Traveller Hot List winner, and many more.

In 2009 Klein and former Vanity Fair editor Graydon Carter, became partners in the Monkey Bar, a New York City bar and restaurant eatery with a history dating to 1936. Both men sold their interest in the property in 2020.

In 2013, Klein purchased the San Vicente Inn in West Hollywood and rebranded the property as San Vicente Bungalows, a private membership club. That same year he purchased No. 850, a boutique hotel. Both opened in late 2018.

== Personal life ==
Klein lives in Beverly Hills with his husband, film producer John Goldwyn.
