= Liz Goldwyn =

American actress

- Born: 1976 (age 48–49); Los Angeles, California, U.S.
- Occupation(s): Director, producer, writer, actress
- Relatives: Tony Goldwyn (paternal half-brother) John Goldwyn (paternal half-brother) Samuel Goldwyn (grandfather) Frances Goldwyn (grandmother)

Liz Goldwyn (born 1976) is an American filmmaker, artist, and writer.

Goldwyn was born in Los Angeles, California, the daughter of writer Peggy Elliott Goldwyn and film producer Samuel Goldwyn Jr. Goldwyn's paternal grandparents were movie mogul Samuel Goldwyn and film actress Frances Howard. She is the younger paternal half-sister of actor Tony Goldwyn and producer John Goldwyn. Goldwyn attended School of Visual Arts in New York City where she received a B.F.A degree in Photography.
