= Ira Drukier =

American hotelier and philanthropist

- Education: Cornell University; Polytechnic Institute of Brooklyn
- Occupations: Hotelier, philanthropist
- Spouse: Gale Drukier
- Children: Jennifer Drukier
- Parent(s): Charles Drukier; Toby Drukier

Ira Drukier is an American hotelier and philanthropist. He co-owns BD Hotels, a hotel chain in New York City.

== Biography ==
=== Early life ===
Ira Drukier grew up in Rego Park, a neighborhood of Queens in New York City. His father, Charles Drukier, was a Holocaust survivor who immigrated to the United States in 1948. He became a real estate investor on the Upper West Side with another Holocaust survivor, Robert Born; they also purchased the Greystone Hotel at West 91st and Broadway. His mother was Toby Drukier.

Drukier graduated from Cornell University in Ithaca, New York in 1966, where he received a Bachelor of Science in Engineering. He then received a PhD in Electrical Engineering from the Polytechnic Institute of Brooklyn in 1973.

=== Career ===
He started his career at the David Sarnoff Research Center of the RCA Corporation in 1973, where he conducted research on microwave semiconductors. Three years later, in 1976, he started working at the Microwave Semiconductor Corporation (MSC), where he conducted research on high-power microwave transistors. After the merger of SMC with Siemens in 1981, he was appointed as corporate vice president. He served in this capacity for two years, until 1983.

In 1985, he co-founded BD Hotels, a hotel chain in New York City, with Richard Born, the son of his father's business partner Robert. The company owns and operates about twenty-five hotels. They include The Mercer Hotel, the Hotel Elysée, the Maritime Hotel and The Jane as well as more affordable hotels like the Skyline and the Belvedere in New York City, and a Ramada Inn at the Newark airport. They have also developed the Greenwich Hotel located at North Moore and Greenwich Streets in TriBeCa with actor Robert De Niro, who owned the land upon which it was built. Moreover, they developed Townhouse in Miami, Florida.

=== Philanthropy ===
Much of his philanthropy has been centered on his commitment to his alma mater, Cornell University. He served on its board of trustees for eight years. He also served on the Cornell Tech Taskforce, which led to the establishment of the Cornell Tech campus on Roosevelt Island. Additionally, he serves as the chair of the council of the Herbert F. Johnson Museum of Art on the Cornell campus. He has also served on the board of overseers of the Weill Cornell Medical College, which is located in New York City, since 2012. With his wife, he donated US$25 million to Cornell University in December 2014. The charitable gift will be used to establish the Drukier Institute for Children's Health at the Weill Cornell Medical College as well as an annual lectureship and faculty prize.

Beyond Cornell, he is a patron of the arts. For example, he serves on the President's Council of the Metropolitan Museum of Art in New York City. He is a past chair of the board of trustees building committee of the Parrish Art Museum in Southampton, New York.

Drukier has supported Jewish causes. He serves as vice chair of the American Society for Yad Vashem. He also serves on the board of overseers of the Museum of Jewish Heritage.

=== Personal life ===
He is married to Gale Drukier, a retired college professor and current philanthropist. Gale serves on the board of numerous charities. They have one adult daughter, Jennifer Drukier. She has 4 children. They reside in New York City.
