= John Goldwyn =

American film producer (born 1958)

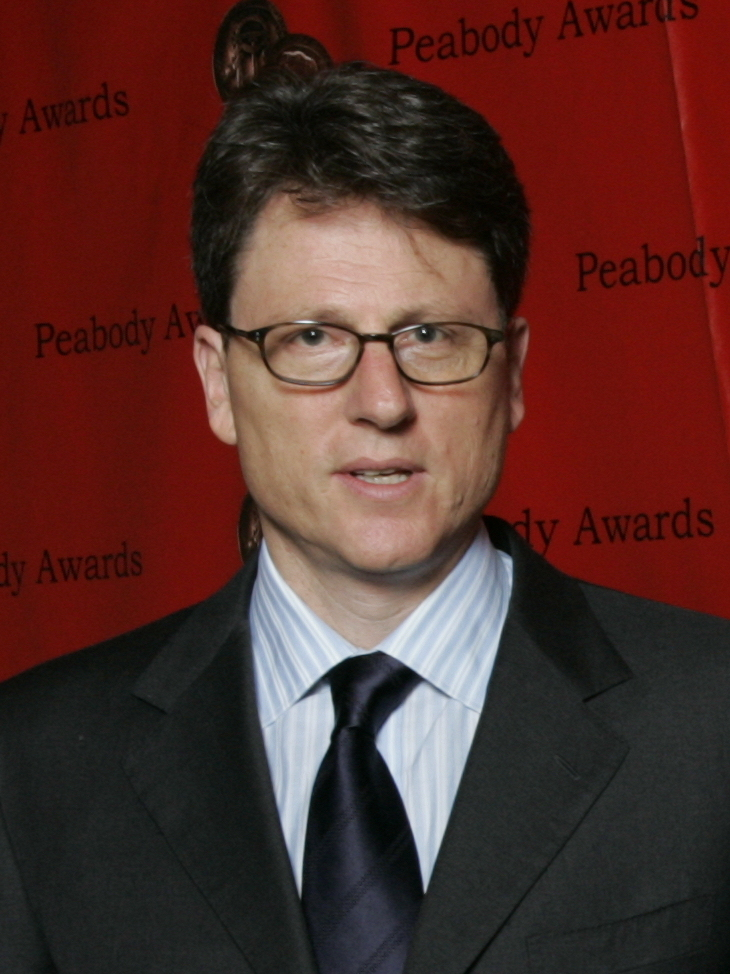
- Goldwyn in 2008
- Born: John Howard Goldwyn; August 10, 1958 (age 68); Los Angeles, California, U.S.
- Education: Stanford University
- Occupation: Producer
- Years active: 1985–present
- Spouses: Colleen Camp (m. 1986; div. 2001) Jeffrey Michael Klein (m. 2011)
- Children: 1
- Parent(s): Samuel Goldwyn Jr. Jennifer Howard
- Relatives: Tony Goldwyn (brother); Liz Goldwyn (half-sister); Samuel Goldwyn (paternal grandfather); Frances Howard (paternal grandmother); Sidney Howard (maternal grandfather); Clare Eames (maternal grandmother)

John Howard Goldwyn (born August 10, 1958) is an American film producer and studio executive.

Goldwyn was born in Los Angeles to a family working in the film industry. After graduating from Stanford with a degree in history, he decided to follow in his parents' footsteps and started his career in 1982 with The Ladd Company. He quickly rose through ranks there and helped create the Police Academy franchise.

The peak of his career lasted from mid-1980s to 1990s, when he worked for MGM/United Artists and later Paramount Pictures. During this period, he oversaw the production of Oscar-winning movies such as Moonstruck, A Fish Called Wanda, Forrest Gump, Braveheart and Titanic. Goldwyn stepped down from his executive role in Paramount in 2003.

Since then, Goldwyn became a producer, releasing some films with Saturday Night Live creator Lorne Michaels before leaning heavily into TV serials, which he produced for the Discovery Channel, Hulu and Showtime.

== Early life and education ==
Goldwyn was born on August 10, 1958, in Los Angeles, California, the son of producer Samuel Goldwyn Jr., and his wife, film and stage actress Jennifer Howard. He has three siblings: actor, director and producer Tony Goldwyn, Francis Goldwyn and Catherine Goldwyn.

His paternal grandparents were Academy Award-winning producer Samuel Goldwyn and actress Frances Howard. His maternal grandparents were Sidney Howard, screenwriter of Gone with the Wind, and Clare Eames, an actress.

Goldwyn graduated from Stanford University in 1981 with a degree in history.

== Career ==
Goldwyn started his career in the mailroom of independent production company The Ladd Company, and as a chauffeur for producer Alan Ladd Jr. In 1982, Goldwyn became executive story editor at the Ladd Company, then the vice president of creative affairs in 1983, where he helped create the Police Academy franchise.

Goldwyn joined MGM/United Artists in 1985, overseeing films such as A Fish Called Wanda and Moonstruck. He became the studio's executive vice president in 1988, heading production.

In 1990, Goldwyn joined Paramount Pictures. He was promoted to president of production the next year, overseeing the production of Oscar-winning films that included Titanic, Forrest Gump and Braveheart. In 2003, Goldwyn left his position as vice chairman of Paramount's motion picture group due to troubles in personal life and lack of blockbuster movies and became a producer for Paramount.

The same year, he and Saturday Night Live creator Lorne Michaels formed Michaels/Goldwyn Productions, leading the production of films that featured Saturday Night Live alumni such as MacGruber and Baby Mama, but none repeated the success of the 1990s movies he oversaw.

Goldwyn was an executive producer and consultant for scripted content at Discovery Channel. While at Discovery, he produced Harley and the Davidsons, and Manhunt: Unabomber, the first installment of Discovery's anthology series about criminal masterminds. In 2017, he signed a first look deal with Lionsgate.

Goldwyn produced the Hulu miniseries Dopesick, released in October 2021 and the Showtime series Dexter: New Blood, released in 2022.

== Personal life ==
Goldwyn married Colleen Camp in 1986 and had one daughter. The couple divorced in 2001. On April 30, 2011, Goldwyn and hotelier Jeffrey Michael Klein celebrated their life partnership in a ceremony in Marshall, California.

== Filmography ==
He was a producer in all films unless otherwise noted.

=== Film ===
Year	Film	Credit
1985	Police Academy 2: Their First Assignment	Executive producer
2007	I'm Not There	
2007	Hot Rod	
2008	Baby Mama	
2010	MacGruber	
2012	The Guilt Trip	
2013	The Secret Life of Walter Mitty	
2015	Staten Island Summer	
2016	Masterminds	

Thanks

Year	Film	Role
2001	An American Rhapsody	The producers and director wish to thank
2019	Above Suspicion	Special thanks

=== Television ===
Year	Title	Credit
2000	Jackie Chan Adventures	
2008	UCB Comedy Originals	
2006−13	Dexter	Executive producer
2014	Gracepoint	Executive producer
2016	Harley and the Davidsons	Executive producer
2017−20	Manhunt	Executive producer
2021	Dopesick	Executive producer
2021	MacGruber	Executive producer
2021−22	Dexter: New Blood	Executive producer
