= Frances Howard (actress) =

American actress (1903–1976)

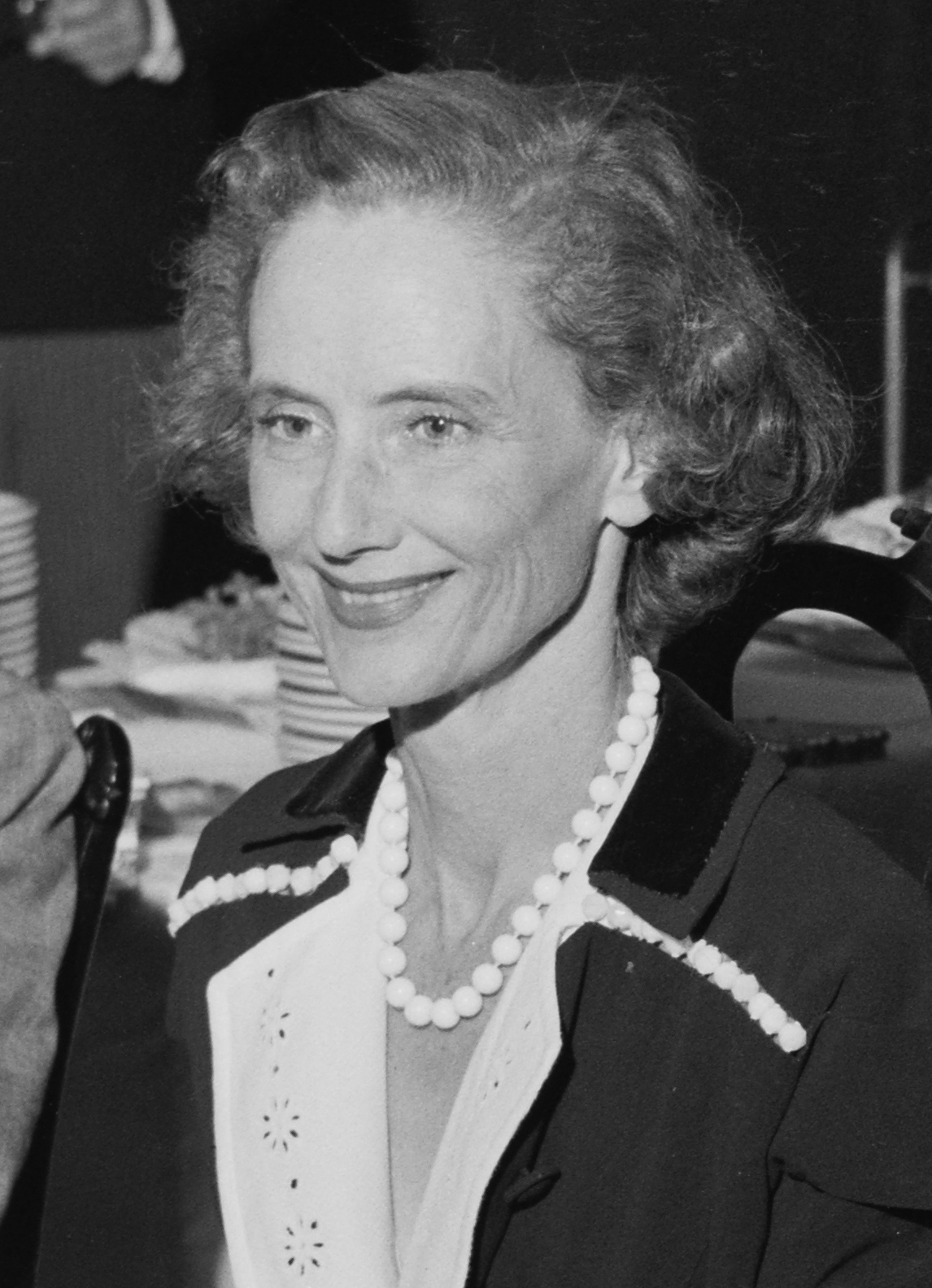
- Howard in 1953
- Born: Frances Howard McLaughlin; June 4, 1903; Omaha, Nebraska, U.S.
- Died: July 2, 1976 (aged 73); Beverly Hills, California, U.S.
- Resting place: Forest Lawn Memorial Park
- Occupation: Actress
- Years active: 1925–1935
- Spouse: Samuel Goldwyn (m. 1925; died 1974)
- Children: Samuel Goldwyn Jr.
- Relatives: John Goldwyn (grandson); Tony Goldwyn (grandson); Liz Goldwyn (granddaughter)

Frances Howard Goldwyn (née McLaughlin; June 4, 1903 – July 2, 1976) was an American actress. She was the second wife of producer Samuel Goldwyn, and the paternal grandmother of actors Tony and John Goldwyn.

== Early life ==
Frances Howard McLaughlin was born in Kansas City, Kansas or Omaha, Nebraska in 1903 to Helen Victoria (née Howard) and Charles Douglas McLaughlin. She was raised as a Catholic. Her mother, nicknamed Bonnie, had been raised a Quaker but converted to Catholicism, and she predeceased her daughter by five years. Her father was reportedly a grandson of Irish nationalist politician Daniel O'Connell. Howard had two sisters and a brother.

== Career ==
Howard began her professional career at age 16 with a stock theater company. When she was 21, Howard portrayed a flapper on Broadway in The Intimate Strangers. She followed that part with another flapper role in The Best People. Paramount signed her to a five-year contract, and she co-starred in the film The Swan. She also appeared in Too Many Kisses (1925). She had the contract canceled when she decided to marry.

== Personal life ==
Howard married Samuel Goldwyn, more than two decades her senior, on April 23, 1925. They remained married until Goldwyn's death on January 31, 1974. They had one son, Samuel Goldwyn Jr..

== Death ==
On July 2, 1976, at the age of 73, Howard died in Beverly Hills, California more than a year after being diagnosed with advanced cancer, for which she refused treatment which would have required invasive and disfiguring surgery. Her funeral was held at Church of the Good Shepherd in Beverly Hills, and she was interred next to her husband at Forest Lawn Memorial Park, Glendale.

== Filmography ==
Howard made four films from 1925 to 1935:

- Too Many Kisses (1925) as Yvonne Hurja
- The Swan (1925) as Alexandra, the Swan
- The Shock Punch (1925) as Dorothy Clark
- Mary Burns, Fugitive (1935) as Landlady

== Legacy ==
The Hollywood Branch Library in the Hollywood neighborhood of Los Angeles is named for Howard, and it acts as an archival repository for many film collections. The library was funded by The Samuel Goldwyn Foundation in 1982 after the previous building was destroyed by arson.
