= The Eagle and the Hawk (1933 film) =

1933 film by Stuart Walker

- theatrical release poster
- Directed by: Stuart Walker; Mitchell Leisen (co-director, credited in 1939 re-release)
- Screenplay by: Seton I. Miller; Bogart Rogers
- Based on: "Death in the Morning" by John Monk Saunders
- Starring: Fredric March; Cary Grant
- Cinematography: Harry Fischbeck
- Edited by: James Smith
- Music by: John Leipold
- Production company: Paramount Pictures
- Distributed by: Paramount Pictures
- Release date: May 6, 1933
- Running time: 68 or 72 minutes
- Country: United States
- Language: English

The Eagle and the Hawk is a 1933 American Pre-Code aerial war film set in World War I . It was directed by Stuart Walker and Mitchell Leisen and was based on an original story by John Monk Saunders. The film stars Fredric March and Cary Grant as Royal Flying Corps fighter pilots. The supporting cast includes Carole Lombard, Jack Oakie, and Sir Guy Standing.

== Plot ==
In World War I, American born pilots Lt. Jerry Young (Fredric March) and Lt. Mike "Slug" Richards (Jack Oakie) join Britain's Royal Flying Corps and are assigned to the dangerous mission of reconnaissance over enemy lines. During furious fighting, Jerry loses his air gunners/observers, one after the other, until only Henry Crocker (Cary Grant) is available to fly with him. The two men had previously met and fought. Jerry's dislike of Crocker grows after Crocker shoots a parachuting German observer who bailed out of a blimp. They eventually become friends of a sort, but Henry realizes that the war is taking a toll on Jerry.

After an enemy raid on his base, the commanding officer, Major Dunham (Guy Standing) sees what is happening to his best pilot, and orders Jerry to go to London on leave after Crocker tells him that Jerry is cracking up. Meeting a young woman (Carole Lombard), Jerry carries on a brief liaison, before being sent back to the front. With Jerry away, Henry flies a mission with Mike that ends with the pilot's death because Henry persuaded him to go back for another pass at an enemy. Jerry blames his friend and asks for a different air observer. On his first mission with Jerry, the new recruit, Lt. John Stevens (Kenneth Howell) is shot and then falls out of the airplane during inverted flight during a dogfight with Voss (Robert Seiter), a famous German ace. He has no parachute and falls to the ground. Jerry then shoots down Voss in a head-on pass. Jerry lands near Voss' crashed airplane and sees that the dead Voss is a young man. Stevens' death and the killing of the young German are the last straw for Jerry, who kills himself in his and Crocker's quarters after attending a drinking party in honor of his killing Voss. Crocker finds Jerry dead later that night, and hides the fact that Jerry is dead from the Major, who visits to check on Jerry.

To preserve his friend's reputation, Crocker loads Jerry's body into an aircraft early the next morning and flies toward the front lines, where Crocker stages things to make it appear that Jerry died in aerial combat. The movie ends showing Jerry's heroic epitaph.

== Cast ==
- Fredric March as Lt. Jerry H. Young
- Cary Grant as Lt. Henry Crocker
- Carole Lombard as The Beautiful Lady
- Jack Oakie as Lt. Mike "Slug" Richards
- Sir Guy Standing as Major Dunham
- Forrester Harvey as Hogan
- Kenneth Howell as Lt. John Stevens
- Leyland Hodgson as Lt. Kingsford
- Virginia Hammond as Lady Erskine
- Douglas Scott as Tommy Erskine
- Robert Seiter as Arnold Voss (Note: Arnold Voss was patterned after Werner Voss.)
- Adrienne D'Ambricourt as Fifi, also known as Fanny
- Russell Scott as Flight sergeant
- Craufurd Kent as General
- Paul Cremonesi as French general
- Yorke Sherwood as taxi driver

Cast notes:

- Both Cary Grant and Carole Lombard appeared in The Eagle and the Hawk before their careers took off and they became major stars, and they both played against (what would become their) type: i.e. Grant would become known as the smart, sophisticated and stylish romantic hero and Lombard as the beautiful screwball comic heroine. Jack Oakie provided the film's comic relief.

== Production ==
Although only appearing in one prolonged sequence, Lombard wearing a luminous gown, was being touted as a coming star and was prominently billed in The Eagle and the Hawk, just below March and Cary Grant; studio promotion also featured Lombard in this scene. For the film's 1939 re-release, Lombard's face was prominently featured in the film's poster.

The working title for the film was "Fly On".

Gary Cooper was set to play the role played in the released film by Cary Grant, and principal photography was delayed in order to allow Cooper to work on another film. George Raft was also considered for the role played by Fredric March.

Although a small number of aerial scenes were called for and noted aerial cinematographer Elmer Dyer was contracted, many of the sequences were clips from two other Paramount productions, Wings (1927) and Young Eagles (1930), as well as Warner Brothers' The Dawn Patrol (1930). Assistant director Michael Leisen, himself a pilot, handled most of the aerial filming, and although uncredited, was responsible for the authentic look of the film. The flying that was filmed specifically for the film was done by the Associated Motion Picture Pilots, colloquially known as the "Suicide Squadron".

Other re-used footage was a crash scene which came from Lilac Time (Warners, 1928).

The period-accurate aircraft assembled for the film included five Thomas-Morse Scouts, four Nieuport 28s, two de Havilland DH-4s, a Curtiss JN-4 and assorted post-World War I types used as "set dressing". The aircraft were all leased from the Garland Lincoln Flying Services, a company that provided aviation equipment for film productions.

During filming, an explosion which went off before it was meant to trapped Grant and March under fallen beams. Grant held up one of the beams, allowing March to disengage himself, but Grant suffered some internal injuries.

Mitchell Leisen was given co-director credit for the film's 1939 re-release. Leisen claimed that he did most of the directing on the film, and that Stuart Walker acted as more of an assistant director, but Walker's contract with Paramount guaranteed him full directorial credit, while Leisen had no contract with the studio.

For the re-release of the film in 1939, some scenes were cut to comply with the Production Code.

== Reception ==
The Eagle and the Hawk was well received and critical reaction was extremely positive, characterizing the film as "... one of the better World War I dramas produced during the 1930s." Reviewer Mordaunt Hall at The New York Times, described the film as "... a vivid and impressive account of the effect of battles in the clouds upon an American ace. It is, fortunately, devoid of the stereotyped ideas which have weakened most of such narratives. Here is a drama told with a praiseworthy sense of realism, and the leading rôle is portrayed very efficiently by Fredric March."
