= Ace of Aces (1933 film) =

1933 film by J. Walter Ruben

- Original theatrical poster
- Directed by: J. Walter Ruben
- Screenplay by: John Monk Saunders; H.W. Hanemann
- Based on: The Bird of Prey by John Monk Saunders
- Produced by: Merian C. Cooper (executive producer)
- Starring: Richard Dix; Elizabeth Allan; Ralph Bellamy
- Cinematography: Henry Cronjager
- Edited by: George Hively
- Music by: Max Steiner
- Production company: RKO Radio Pictures
- Distributed by: RKO Radio Pictures
- Release date: October 20, 1933
- Running time: 76 minutes
- Country: United States
- Language: English

Ace of Aces, also known as Bird of Prey, is a 1933 American pre-Code war film based on the story "The Bird of Prey" by World War I pilot John Monk Saunders that explores how war can turn a man's moral compass from pacifism to warmonger. Starring Richard Dix, it was similar to many of the period films that appeared to glorify the "knights of the air", but was more complex, examining the motivations of those who choose to go to war.

== Plot ==
When the United States enters World War I, Rocky Thorne has no interest in joining the military, but just wants to pursue his career as a sculptor. He is cynical about the purpose of the war and the enthusiasm of those who have enlisted, comparing them to lemmings that will swim until they drown themselves. But his fiancée, Nancy Adams, becomes a Red Cross nurse; she mocks his pacifism and accuses him of cowardice. To prove his bravery, he enlists and becomes a fighter pilot as part of the American Expeditionary Forces. Arriving at his assigned squadron, he is concerned about the people he is going to be shooting at. On his first mission, he gets behind a German fighter, but cannot bring himself to shoot. His opponent takes advantage of this and reverses the situation. When he is shot at, he loses his scruples and shoots his foe down.

Rocky now renounces his past attitude and becomes completely committed to the war in the air, even taking solo flights against orders, to get more chances to shoot down Germans. In a few months, he becomes a leading ace. Then, while on furlough in Paris, he runs into his former love, who is a nurse on the front lines. She has been impacted by her experiences and is torn by guilt. When Rocky says that he does not want to waste his valuable leave time on talking and makes it clear he wants to spend the night with her, she reluctantly lets him.

Back at the squadron, a German cadet drops a note over the airfield, telling the Americans that one of their pilots who was shot down is alive as a prisoner. At this point, Rocky flies overhead. Not having seen the note being dropped, he shoots down the young German, who is badly injured. Rocky himself is injured. At the hospital, Rocky is placed in the bed next to the German's. The young man is in agony and is not allowed liquids because it would kill him, due to his stomach wound. Eventually he begs for water, saying he is going to die anyway, and Rocky leaves a bottle of wine by his bedside. Rocky's ruthlessness is shaken.

Then Rocky is told he is being transferred away from the front to become an instructor. But before it takes effect, he learns that a pilot in another squadron has that day overtaken him for the lead in victories, 44 to 42. He requests a solo mission, but Captain Blake turns him down. He flies anyway. He spots five Germans and gets on their tail unnoticed, but as he is about to shoot, he has a vision of the German cadet and cannot bring himself to fire. One German sees him and shoots him down, but he survives.

In the final scene, he still feels guilty for what he became, and says he has been unable to sculpt. But Nancy is supportive and still wants to marry him.

== Cast ==
- Richard Dix as 2nd Lieutenant Rex "Rocky" Thorne
- Elizabeth Allan as Nancy Adams
- Ralph Bellamy as Captain Blake
- Theodore Newton as 1st Lieutenant Foster "Froggy" Kelley
- Nella Walker as Mrs. Adams
- Anderson Lawlor as 2nd Lieutenant Roger "Red" Cahill
- Frank Conroy as Major, and later Lieutenant Colonel, Wentworth
- Joe Sauers as Captain Daly
- Arthur Jarrett as 2nd Lieutenant James "Jenny" Lind
- Claude Gillingwater Jr. as 1st Lieutenant Tommy Gray
- Clarence Stroud as 2nd Lieutenant Billy Winstead
- Claude Stroud as 2nd Lieutenant Carroll Winstead
- Frank Clarke as Helmut Gorin, German cadet
- William Cagney as 2nd Lieutenant Meeker
- Howard Wilson as 2nd Lieutenant Tim "Tombstone" Terry
- Frank Melton as 2nd Lieutenant Phil "Pee Wee" Parker
- Carl Eric Hansen as Lieutenant Nicholas Healy
- George Lollier as 2nd Lieutenant Ralph "Rudderbar" Smith
- Grady Sutton as Party guest
- Betty Furness as Party guest

William Cagney, the brother of James Cagney made his motion picture debut in Ace of Aces as an actor and went on to become a Hollywood producer.

== Production ==
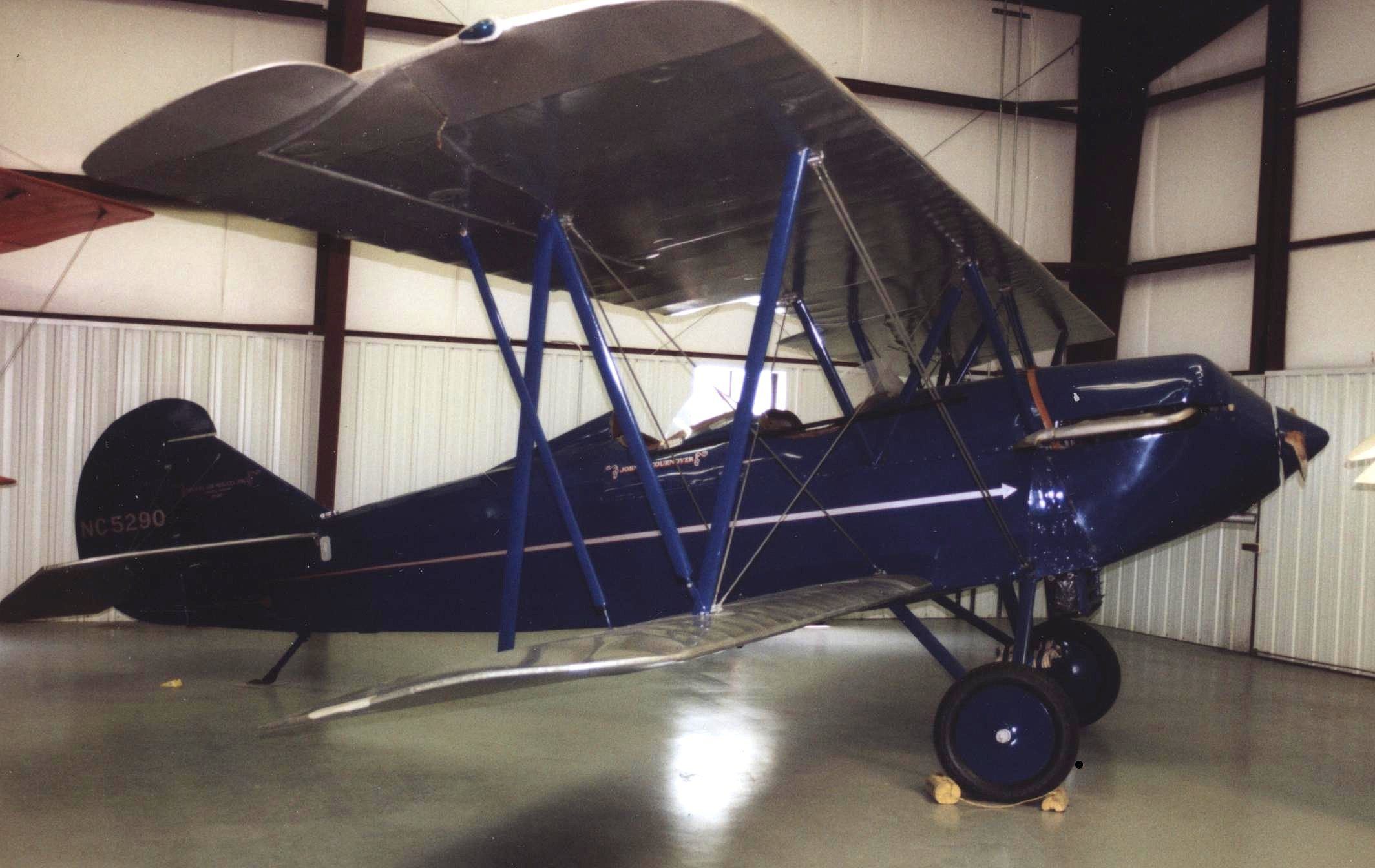
The ubiquitous Travel Air Model B "Wichita Fokker" made up the core of the German enemy air force.

John Monk Saunders wrote stories about flying that were influenced by his service as a flight instructor in World War I. In 1933, two of the stories that had a strong antiwar theme were turned into films. The first story, Death in the Morning was turned into The Eagle and the Hawk released in May 1933. His second story, The Bird of Prey became the basis of Ace of Aces, which was shot in the summer and came out in October 1933.

Ace of Aces featured five Waco 7s, five Travel Air Model B "Wichita Fokkers", a small number of Nieuport 28s, a Curtiss JN4 Jenny, Garland-Lincoln LF-1 (Nieuport 28 Replica), and a Fleet Model 1, along with two SE.5 mock-ups while a Waco also served as a camera plane for the aerial sequences. Noted Hollywood stunt pilot Frank Clarke was one of a team of eight pilots who flew in the film. Some of the aerial footage was taken from the earlier Howard Hughes opus, Hell's Angels (1930).

== Reception ==
Contemporary reviews of Ace of Aces were not positive; Mordaunt Hall, The New York Times reviewer noted, "In a style that is slow, obvious and at times childishly sentimental ... Richard Dix is heavy-handed and generally inexpert in the principal role. Elizabeth Allan, who seems to one biased observer to be the most genuinely talented and charming of Hollywood's recent acquisitions, gives 'Ace of Aces' its only good moments." More recent reviews have focused on the "strongly anti-war drama", and the callousness of killing men in the air in Ace of Aces, revealed as the hero has to examine his life and the choices he has made as a fighter pilot. Leonard Maltin considered it, a "Sincere antiwar tract, but far too melodramatic."

Filmmaker Guy Maddin is an avowed fan of the film, describing it in an article for Film Comment as an "absolutely perfect low-budget fighter-pilot picture that deserves the same reputation as Gun Crazy" and praising Dix as a "forgotten American treasure."
