= The Last Flight (1931 film) =

1931 film

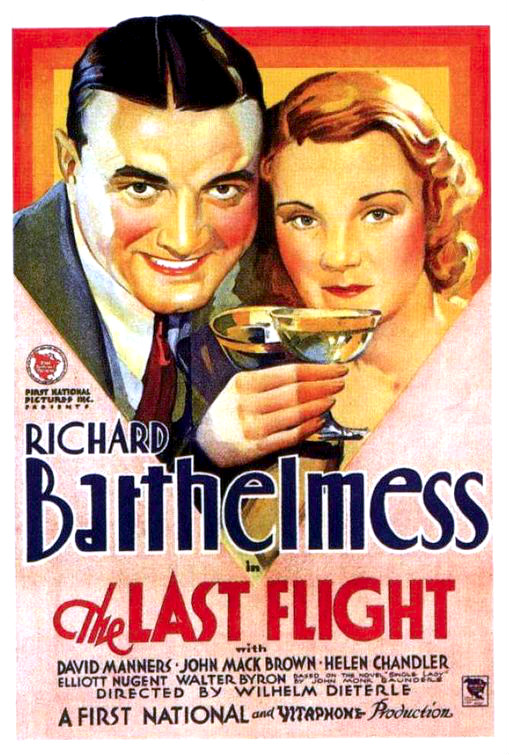
- Theatrical release poster
- Directed by: William Dieterle
- Written by: John Monk Saunders; Byron Morgan
- Based on: Single Lady; 1931 novel by John Monk Saunders
- Produced by: Mac Julian
- Starring: Richard Barthelmess; David Manners; John Mack Brown; Helen Chandler
- Cinematography: Sidney Hickox
- Edited by: Alexander Hall
- Music by: Leo F. Forbstein
- Production company: First National Pictures
- Distributed by: Warner Bros. Pictures
- Release date: August 29, 1931
- Running time: 76 minutes
- Country: United States
- Language: English
- Budget: $491,000
- Box office: $450,000

The Last Flight (aka Single Lady and Spent Bullets) is a 1931 American pre-Code ensemble cast film, starring Richard Barthelmess, David Manners, John Mack Brown and Helen Chandler. It was directed by German filmmaker William Dieterle in his debut as an English-language film director.

Modern sources consider The Last Flight one of the few cinematic treatments of "The Lost Generation." The scarred young World War I veterans have opted out of society to drink indefinitely and almost continuously in Paris with the vivacious and beautiful woman they have befriended.

== Plot ==
After World War I, pilots Cary Lockwood, Shep Lambert, Bill Talbot and Francis band together in Paris. Feeling they have no future, the men are constantly drunk. One night, as they make the rounds of nightclubs, they meet Nikki, a wealthy but aimless woman, who they invite into their group. Later, when an American reporter named Frink makes a pass at Nikki, she shows no interest in him.

The ex-flyers move to Nikki's hotel where they continue drinking. Nikki is attracted to Cary and she tags along when Cary goes to the Père Lachaise Cemetery where he tells her the story of Héloïse and Abelard, star-crossed lovers who are buried there. When Nikki starts to cry, Cary is sympathetic until she announces that she now has names for her two turtles. With that, Cary suddenly gets angry and decides to leave for Portugal.

After learning of his plans, Nikki and the others, including Frink, follow him. On the train, Frink tries to force himself on Nikki but the other men come to her rescue. At a bullfight in Lisbon, Bill rashly leaps into the ring and is fatally gored. With Bill at the hospital, the others visit a carnival where outside a shooting gallery, Cary and Frink quarrel and Frink threatens to shoot Cary.

Without thinking, Francis shoots Frink while Shep is fatally wounded in the crossfire. Frightened, Francis disappears and the group is forever split asunder. Cary explains to Nikki that after the war, all they had left was their comradeship. She begs to stay with him.

== Cast (in credits order) ==
- Richard Barthelmess as Cary Lockwood
- David Manners as Shep Lambert
- John Mack Brown as Bill Talbot
- Helen Chandler as Nikki
- Elliott Nugent as Francis
- Walter Byron as Frink

=== Uncredited cast ===
- Luis Alberni as Spectator at Bullfight
- Herbert Bunston as Man on Train
- Yola d'Avril as French Party Girl at Cafe
- Jay Eaton as Man in Claridge Bar*
- George Irving as Military doctor
- Wallace MacDonald as Officer at Hospital

== Production ==
The film's pre-release titles were Spent Bullets and Single Lady. The novel, Single Lady by John Monk Saunders is based on a series of stories featuring the character "Nikki," which were published in Liberty Weekly (November 15, 1930 – January 17, 1931) as Nikki and Her War Birds.

This was German-born director William Dieterle's first English language picture. Since the late 1920s, he had worked in Hollywood directing several German-language versions of American features. Variety indicates that William Wellman was originally scheduled to direct The Last Flight.

Pre-code files indicate that censors objected to sexual innuendo and skimpy clothing in some scenes in the film. Modern sources add Yola d'Avril and Luis Alberni to the cast.

The aircraft scenes in The Last Flight were taken from The Dawn Patrol (1930).

Elliott Nugent recalled, " We all had a lot of fun making the picture, and it did not occur to me that this was to be my last job as a motionpicture actor."

== Reception ==
The Last Flight was critically reviewed by Mordaunt Hall in The New York Times. He praised the film with the comment: "From flashes of air battles on the eve of the armistice, 'The Last Flight,' a picture which was offered last evening at the Warners' Strand, branches into a curious but often brilliant study of the post-war psychology of four injured American aviators. Their mad waggery and reckless drinking ends darkly for three of them, but the fourth, Cary Lockwood, played by Richard Barthelmess, finds happiness with a girl named Nikki, whose humor and outlook on life has a great deal in common with that of the fliers."

Starting in the 1970s, the film has been rediscovered and many critics view it as a "neglected gem" or a "lost classic". Film historian and critic Dennis Schwartz called The Last Flight "a film that has flown under the radar, but is worth seeking out" and compared it to Ernest Hemingway's The Sun Also Rises. He stated: "The visuals are excellent, and the film is fast moving and has a great snappy banter. It suffers from none of the awkwardness many of the early talkie films had, and is easily the best pic Dieterle ever shot (...)". He also called the performance by Helen Chandler "pitch perfect brilliant".

=== Box Office ===
According to Warner Bros the film earned $405,000 domestically and $45,000 foreign.

== Popular culture ==
The most lasting impact of The Last Flight was, however, offscreen. Shortly after the film's release, Cary Grant appeared opposite Fay Wray and Douglass Montgomery on Broadway, starting on September 29, 1931, on a musical adaptation entitled Nikki. Grant was still billed as "Archie Leach" but adopted his first name from the character, "Cary Lockwood", whom he played on stage and the one Barthelmess had portrayed in the film version. (Note: Later the same year, John Mack Brown also adopted a new name, "Johnny Mack Brown" when his career skidded from top-drawer films like The Last Flight and The Secret Six (1937) to B westerns. In the same year, Helen Chandler, also starred with David Manners in the original Dracula opposite Bela Lugosi but ironically fell victim to alcoholism later in life and was badly disfigured in a fire caused by falling asleep while smoking.)

== Preservation status ==
- The film is preserved in the Library of Congress collection.
