= Garland-Lincoln LF-1 =

LF-1
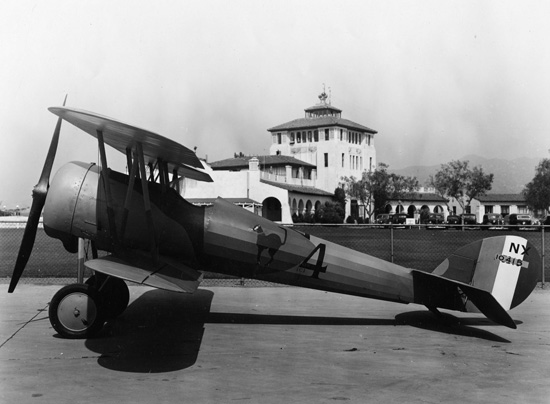

General information
- Type: Movie aircraft
- National origin: United States
- Manufacturer: Garland-Lincoln
- Designer: Claude Flagg
- Primary user: Movie Studios
- Number built: 3

History
- Introduction date: 1938

The Garland-Lincoln LF-1 (Lincoln-Flagg-1) is a replica World War I Nieuport 28 aircraft used for movie stunts and reenactments.

== Design and development ==
The LF-1 was built in Glendale, California specifically to represent a World War I Nieuport 28 fighter for movie stunt work. Designed by Claude Flagg, the aircraft was commissioned by Garland Lincoln, a pilot and supplier of aircraft for motion picture work. Three examples were built.

While similar in appearance, the aircraft is shorter than the Nieuport it replicates, with a 200 hp (149 kW) radial engine that is much more powerful. Other modifications included the substitution of a steel tube framework and a one-piece upper wing without dihedral.

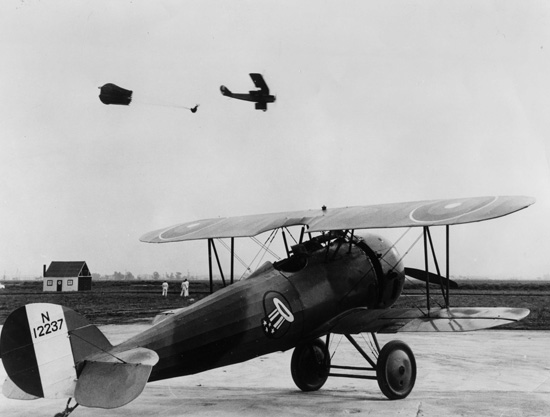
On set with a Standard J-1 in the background

== Operational history ==
Model N12237 was featured in Hell in the Heavens (1934), Dawn Patrol (1938), and Men with Wings (1938). It was later used by Frank Tallman and Paul Mantz in other film and television work.

While still owned by Tallmantz, the aircraft appeared in television shows including "Get Smart", "The Twilight Zone", and "My Three Sons." In the early 1970s the LF-1 was named "Snoopy" when the Red Baron first appeared in Charles M Schulz's Peanuts comic strip. Schulz used the aircraft to promote Snoopy as the Flying Ace at publicity events.

In 1975, Frank Tallman piloted the repainted LF-1 to appear in The Great Waldo Pepper. Tallman was hospitalized after the aircraft collided with high tension wires and crashed during filming. He offered the damaged aircraft for sale and Brent Moné, as of 2012, owns the aircraft.

== Specifications (Garland-Lincoln LF-1) ==
Data from Popular Aviation, June 1937

General characteristics

- Crew: one
- Empty weight: 1,343 lb (609 kg)
- Powerplant: 1 × Wright J-4-B radial engine, 200 hp (150 kW)

Performance

- Maximum speed: 184 kn (212 mph, 341 km/h)
- Cruise speed: 160 kn (180 mph, 290 km/h)
- Wing loading: 7.5 lb/sq ft (37 kg/m^{2})

== See also ==
Aircraft of comparable role, configuration, and era

- Nieuport 28
