= A Kiss in the Dark (1925 film) =

1925 film

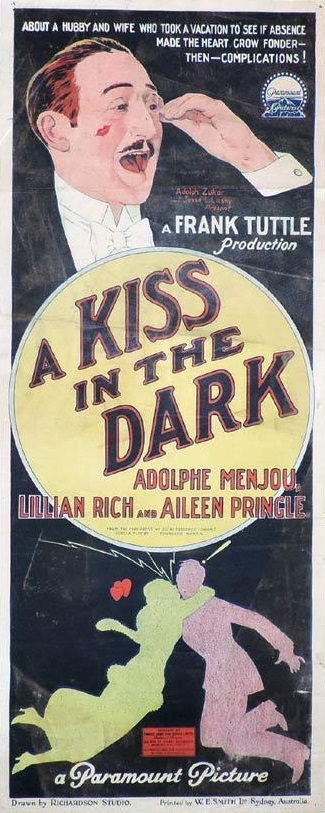
- Film poster
- Directed by: Frank Tuttle
- Screenplay by: Townsend Martin (scenario)
- Based on: Aren't We All? 1923 play by Frederick Lonsdale
- Produced by: Jesse L. Lasky; Adolph Zukor
- Starring: Adolphe Menjou; Aileen Pringle; Lillian Rich; Kenneth MacKenna; Ann Pennington; Kitty Kelly; Zeppo Marx
- Cinematography: Alvin Wyckoff
- Production company: Famous Players–Lasky Corporation
- Distributed by: Paramount Pictures
- Release date: April 6, 1925
- Running time: 60 minutes
- Country: United States
- Language: Silent (English intertitles)

A Kiss in the Dark is a 1925 American silent comedy film directed by Frank Tuttle and written by Townsend Martin based upon a novel by Frederick Lonsdale. The film stars Adolphe Menjou, Aileen Pringle, Lillian Rich, Kenneth MacKenna, Ann Pennington, Kitty Kelly, and Zeppo Marx. The film was released on April 6, 1925, by Paramount Pictures.

== Plot ==
As described in a film magazine review, a gay philanderer has one flirtation after another. When he really falls in love with a beautiful young woman, she refuses to take him seriously until he proves his fidelity by patching up a quarrel between a married couple, who are friends of the lovers.

== Cast ==
- Adolphe Menjou as Walter Grenham
- Aileen Pringle as Janet Livingstone
- Lillian Rich as Betty King
- Kenneth MacKenna as Johnny King
- Ann Pennington as Specialty Dancer
- Kitty Kelly as Chorus Girl
- Zeppo Marx in unknown role

== Legacy ==
This film is historically notable for the appearance of Zeppo Marx of the Marx Brothers. He is credited by his birth name, Herbert Marx. This was the only film in which Zeppo stars without his brothers. (His older brother Harpo made his solo film debut a three months earlier in the similarly titled Too Many Kisses.) Neither of the two recovered reels feature Zeppo, but Marx researcher Robert Moulton uncovered a 1925 review in an Ohio newspaper listing a credit for "...Herbert Marx, one of the Marx brothers in the 'I'll Say She Is' company." A review for the film from the New York Sun dated April 7, 1925 praises Zeppo's performance: "Miss Pennington and Mr. Marx have only brief appearances, but they make them count."

== Preservation ==
A Kiss in the Dark was considered to be a lost film for decades, until two of its six reels were discovered by a private collector.
