= Star of the Circus =

- Directed by: Albert de Courville
- Written by: Heinrich Seiler (novel); Hans H. Zerlett; Dudley Leslie; Elizabeth Meehan; John Monk Saunders
- Produced by: Walter C. Mycroft
- Starring: Otto Kruger; Gertrude Michael; John Clements; Patrick Barr
- Cinematography: Claude Friese-Greene
- Edited by: Lionel Tomlinson
- Music by: Leo Leux
- Production company: Associated British Picture Corporation
- Distributed by: Associated British Film Distributors
- Release date: 15 March 1938
- Running time: 68 minutes
- Country: United Kingdom
- Language: English
- Budget: £33,513

Star of the Circus is a 1938 British drama film directed by Albert de Courville and starring Otto Kruger, Gertrude Michael and John Clements. It was written Hans H. Zerlett, Dudley Leslie, Elizabeth Meehan and John Monk Saunders, based on the novel by Heinrich Seiler, and is a remake of the 1937 German circus film Truxa. It was made at Elstree Studios.

== Cast ==
- Otto Kruger as Garvin
- Gertrude Michael as Yester
- John Clements as Paul Houston
- Patrick Barr as Truxa
- Barbara Blair as Hilda
- Gene Sheldon as Peters
- John Turnbull as Tenzler
- Norah Howard as Frau Schlipp
- Alfred Wellesley as Ackermann

== Reception ==
The Monthly Film Bulletin wrote: "The story is both thin and fantastic, but the thrills are genuine, and the unusual camera-angles involved in the photography of the tight-rope act are effective. The acting of the three principal characters is good, but some of the minor parts are weak. The camera-work is variable in quality, sometimes very good, and occasionally bad."

The Daily Film Renter wrote: "Direction is a trifle leisurely in tempo, but the plot holds attention, dramatic values mounting steadily as the climax approaches. ... Gertrude Michael plays Yester with skill, especially in her more emotional passages. John Clements is excellent as Houston, and Otto Kruger completes the trio as the illusionist, securing most of his effects with commendable restraint. Barbara Blair and Gene Sheldon turn in attractive comedy relief to lighten the tensity of the plot."

Variety wrote: "Gene Sheldon almost steals the picture as the shy, elfin stage-manager and, despite the absence of his vaudeville makeup, many of his quaint facial expressions and mannerisms register and his whole screen personality is more than pleasing. Circus yarns are not generally popular, and however improved this one might be, fact remains scope is usually limited in this field. Generally good production, effective 'local atmosphere' and painstaking detail but Otto Kruger might have been better employed."
