= Too Many Kisses =

1925 film by Paul Sloane

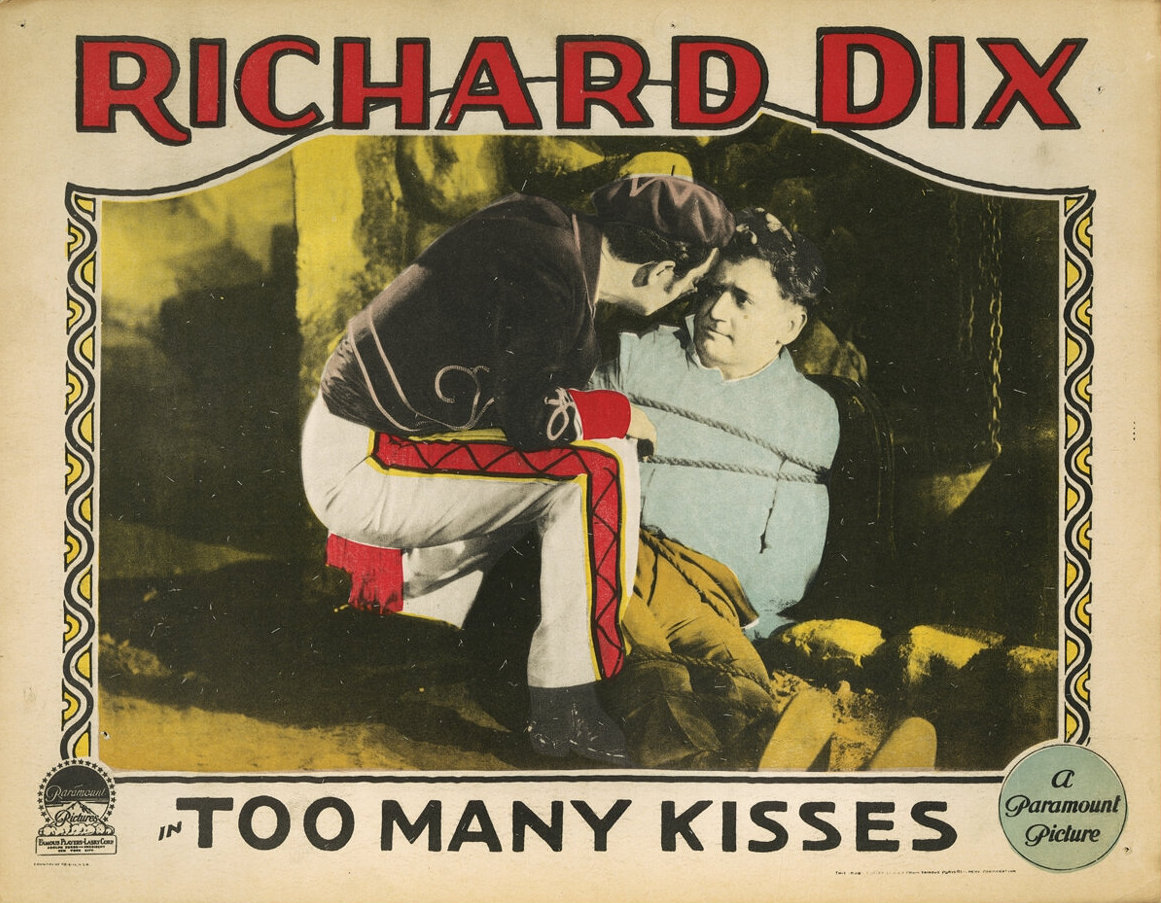
- Lobby card for the film
- Directed by: Paul Sloane
- Screenplay by: Gerald Duffy (scenario)
- Based on: A Maker of Gestures; 1923 story in Cosmopolitan by John Monk Saunders
- Produced by: Jesse L. Lasky; Adolph Zukor
- Starring: Richard Dix; Frances Howard; William Powell; Frank Currier; Harpo Marx
- Cinematography: Hal Rosson
- Production company: Famous Players–Lasky
- Distributed by: Paramount Pictures
- Release date: March 1, 1925
- Running time: 60 minutes; 6 reels (5,759 feet)
- Country: United States
- Language: Silent (English intertitles)

Too Many Kisses (1925) by Paul Sloane

Too Many Kisses is a 1925 American silent comedy film directed by Paul Sloane that is based on the John Monk Saunders story "A Maker of Gestures."

== Plot ==
Richard Gaylord Jr. is a modern Lothario who has so many sweethearts that his father does not know what to do with him. Tired of paying to get his son out of one romantic entanglement after another, Richard Gaylord Sr. sends his son to the Basque region of France, believing that the women there will only accept attentions from their own people.

Almost immediately, local girl Yvonne Hurja becomes infatuated with Richard, whom she sees as being able to help her break free from the unwanted attention of local guardsman Julio. A rivalry grows between Richard and Julio.

== Cast ==
- Richard Dix as Richard Gaylord, Jr
- Frances Howard as Yvonne Hurja
- William Powell as Julio
- Frank Currier as Richard Gaylord, Sr
- Joseph Burke as Mr. Simmons
- Albert Tavernier as Manuel Hurja
- Arthur Ludwig as Miguel
- Paul Panzer as Pedro
- Harpo Marx as The Village Peter Pan
- Alyce Mills as Flapper

== Reception ==
A review in Billboard stated "This is an excellent selection for any exhibitor...Dix, as Richard Gaylord, is dashing and pleasing in every scene. His admirers especially will derive gratification from his work".

A Variety review noted: "Incidentally 'Harpo' Marx, of musical comedy fame (Marx Brothers), does a half-wit that makes him a screen possibility for comedies who will bear watching".

== Legacy ==
This film is notable for being the earliest surviving film to feature Harpo Marx of the Marx Brothers. It is the only film in which he did not star alongside his brothers. (His youngest brother Zeppo appeared in the similarly titled A Kiss in the Dark, released three months later.) Harpo plays the Village Peter Pan and technically has speaking lines (albeit not heard, because this is a silent film) for the first and last time in his screen career.

For several years, Too Many Kisses had been considered a lost film until a print was discovered in the early 1970s. It has since been restored by the Film Preservation Society. On November 29, 2020, the film was shown on television for the first time on Turner Classic Movies and was released on Blu-ray the following day. Harpo's son Bill Marx composed and recorded a soundtrack for this restoration.

== See also ==
- A Kiss in the Dark (1925 film)
