= What Price Porky =

1938 film by Robert Clampett

- Title card
- Directed by: Robert Clampett
- Produced by: Leon Schlesinger
- Starring: Mel Blanc
- Music by: Carl W. Stalling
- Animation by: Chuck Jones; Bob Cannon
- Color process: Black-and-white
- Production company: Leon Schlesinger Productions
- Distributed by: Warner Bros. Productions; The Vitaphone Corporation
- Release date: February 26, 1938
- Running time: 7 min
- Country: United States
- Language: English

What Price Porky is a 1938 American animated comedy short film directed by Robert Clampett. The cartoon was released on February 26, 1938. It is the 98th film in the Looney Tunes series, the 36th cartoon to feature Porky Pig and the third cartoon to star Daffy Duck.

== Plot ==
Porky Pig wakes up one day to feed his chickens, only for his corn to be stolen by numerous black ducks led by Daffy Duck. Daffy writes a letter that insults the chickens while Porky tries to negotiate peacefully. The chickens and ducks go to war on each other.

The chickens use feed to lure newbornborn chicks and more chicken to the frontline while the ducks prepare their army, navy and air force. The chicks use a hen as cover and shoot an overconfident duck. An airship fashioned with a sausage is eaten by a duck while the chick in it parachutes to safety. Daffy pretends to be the Easter Bunny and deploys eggs with newborn ducklings which assault an oblivious Porky.

At night, a cigar-smoking duckling launches a smokescreen on the chicken's side, allowing the ducks to advance. As the smokescreen prematurely fades, the ducks manage to deceive the chickens by doing a dance routine, earning cheers before the ducks assault them. The ducks launch fresh eggs with newborn ducklings who accidentally land on and hit their peers. Porky physically moves a hole he is in to evade bombings. A duck steps on a landmine, which sends him flying to a pole on a tree, only to be killed by a bombing and turned into roast duck. Porky seals the hole shut after a warhead falls in and manages to turn the tide with a machine gun improvised from a wringer washer and a bag of corn, trapping Daffy and the other ducks. Porky attempts to taunt Daffy by having the chickens eat corn in front of him, but Daffy retaliates by sending ducklings to steal them instead.

== Voice Cast ==
- Mel Blanc as Porky Pig / Daffy Duck / Ducks and Chickens
- Harry Lang as Donald sound-alike duck (Two lines: "Halt, who's there!" and "That way!") (unconfirmed)
- Bob Clampett as Various Duck and Chicken noises (unconfirmed)

== Home media ==
- DVD 2007 - The Dawn Patrol (extra) - Warner Home Video
- DVD 2007 - Looney Tunes Golden Collection: Volume 5 (restored) - Warner Home Video
- DVD 2017 - Porky Pig 101 (restored) - Warner Archive Collection

== See also ==
- What Price Glory? (play)
- What Price Glory? (1926 film)
- Daffy Duck filmography
- Porky Pig filmography
- Looney Tunes and Merrie Melodies filmography (1930–1939)
