= Bogart Rogers =

American screenwriter

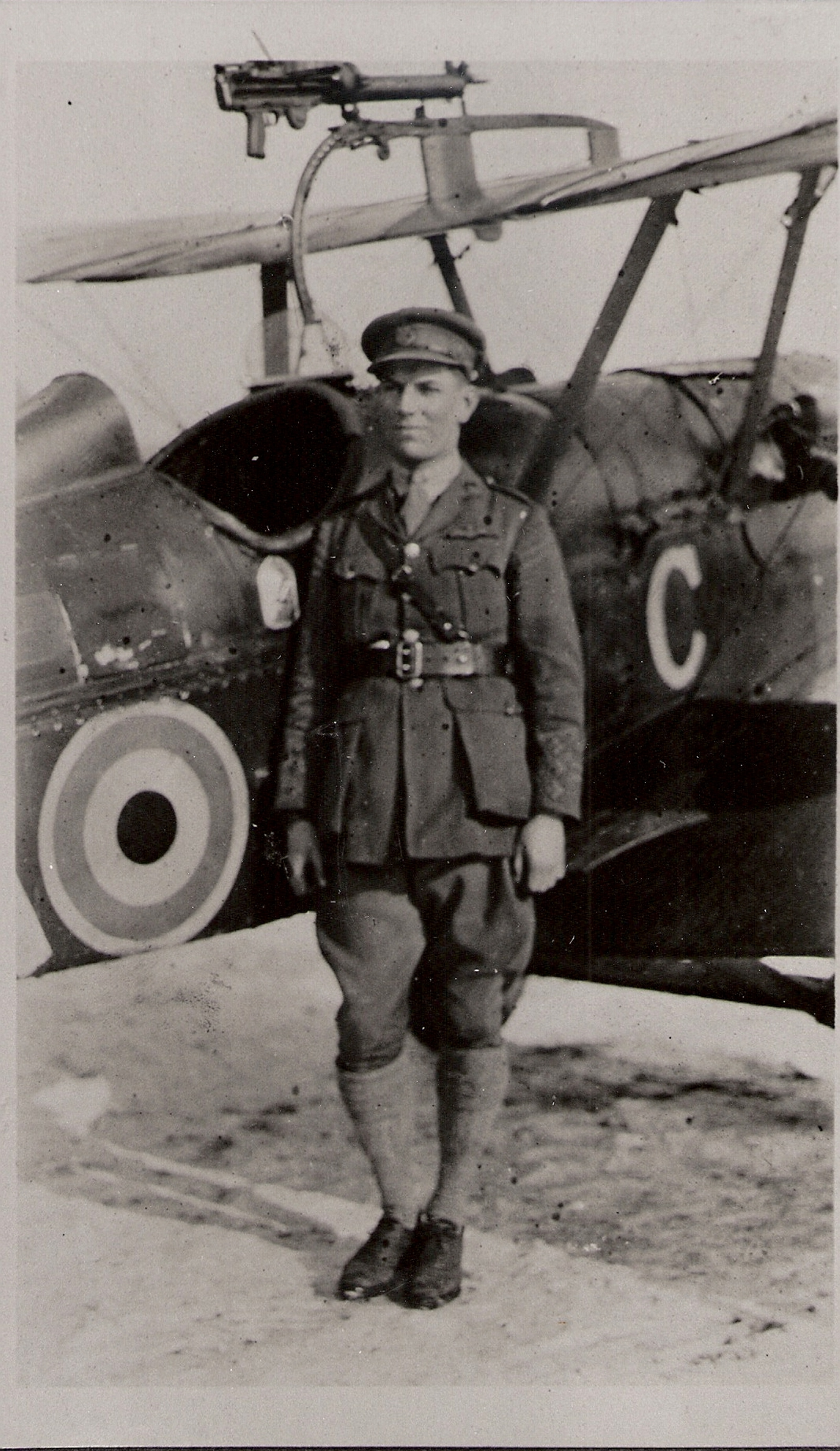
- Captain Bogart Rogers in 1919
- Born: June 24, 1897
- Died: July 24, 1966 (aged 69)
- Burial place: Forest Lawn Memorial Park (Hollywood Hills), Los Angeles, California
- Military career
- Allegiance: United States
- Branch: Royal Air Force (United Kingdom)
- Unit: No. 32 Squadron RAF
- Conflicts: World War I

Bogart Rogers (24 June 1897 – 24 July 1966) was an American motion picture writer, producer, innovator, and a pursuit pilot and a flying ace in World War I with the Royal Air Force.

== Biography ==
Born in Los Angeles, California, Rogers enlisted in the British Royal Flying Corps in the spring of 1917 after the United States entry into World War I. A sophomore at Stanford University, he and four friends traveled to Canada to train as pilots. Choosing to remain in the Royal Air Force, (Note: the RFC was renamed the RAF on 1 April 1918) after training, Rogers was assigned to the RAF 32 Squadron in May, 1918. He was credited with six victories while flying the Royal Aircraft Factory S.E.5a. He earned the following medals: Distinguished Flying Cross (DFC, British), World War I Inter-allied Victory Medal, British War Medal, and Order of Michael the Brave (Romania). He left the Royal Air Force in May 1919 and returned to the United States.

After the war, Rogers began a career in the motion picture industry in his native Los Angeles. He was a screenwriter, technical advisor and also was a producer. By 1933 he had written and produced his first motion picture for Paramount Studios, The Eagle and the Hawk, about two American fliers in France, starring Fredric March, Cary Grant, and Carole Lombard. In 1936 he produced Pigskin Parade, a movie with Judy Garland and Jack Haley about a country farmer who becomes a college football hero. Near the end of the 1930s he invested in a horse-race photo-finish camera, an invention that, to his astonishment, turned out to be so successful that he formed a corporation, Photochart Inc., and became its president. After the United States entered World War II, Bogart's friend Eddie Rickenbacker, president of Eastern Airlines, offered to help him obtain a commission in the Army Air Corps. Years had passed since he held the controls of an airplane...so he chose instead to write about the war in numerous magazine articles and a book about the Flying Tigers. In December 1960 he attended a reunion of World War I pilots in New York. The Air Force Museum captured the event on film. A larger reunion was scheduled for June 1961, but he was unable to attend having suffered a stroke with partial paralysis of his right side. Eventually he recovered. Managing the photo-finish activities for 35 horse racing associations as President of Photochart took most of his time. It was during the 1966 horse racing season that he collapsed with a blood clot in his leg at the Hollywood Park racetrack. He was taken to St. Joseph's hospital in Burbank where he died the next day, July 24, one month after his 69th birthday and 48 years since he had fought in the Great War.

== See also ==
- List of World War I flying aces from the United States
