= The Finger Points =

1931 film

- Novelization of The Finger Points
- Directed by: John Francis Dillon
- Screenplay by: John Monk Saunders; W.R. Burnett; Robert Lord
- Produced by: John Francis Dillon
- Starring: Richard Barthelmess; Fay Wray; Regis Toomey; Robert Elliott; Clark Gable; Oscar Apfel; Robert Gleckler
- Cinematography: Ernest Haller
- Edited by: LeRoy Stone
- Music by: David Mendoza (Vitaphone Orch cond)
- Production companies: First National Pictures; The Vitaphone Corporation
- Distributed by: Warner Bros. Pictures
- Release date: April 11, 1931
- Running time: 85 minutes
- Country: United States
- Language: English

The Finger Points is a 1931 American Pre-Code drama film directed by John Francis Dillon and written by John Monk Saunders, W.R. Burnett and Robert Lord. The film stars Richard Barthelmess, Fay Wray, Regis Toomey, Robert Elliott, Clark Gable, Oscar Apfel and Robert Gleckler. The film was released by Warner Bros. Pictures on April 11, 1931.

Clark Gable was chosen to be Louis J. Blanco, the chief enforcer of the mob. Contracted with MGM, Gable filmed scenes for The Finger Points, Night Nurse, and The Easiest Way simultaneously.

== Plot ==
Breckenridge "Breck" Lee is a young, naïve kid from the South who comes to a big city to get a job as a newspaperman. After getting hired by The Press, his first assignment is to expose the existence of a newly opened gambling parlor. Gangster Louis J. Blanco attempts to bribe Lee to keep quiet. Lee refuses to accept the bribe, and publishes an article about the casino which subsequently gets raided by the police. Mugged and severely beaten by gangsters, Lee winds up in the hospital. Upon leaving the hospital and returning to work, he longs to marry fellow reporter Marcia Collins, but his meager salary combined with the hospital bill prevents this from happening. Lee attempts to seek a raise from City Editor Frank Carter, but is refused the increase in pay.

Yearning for the aforementioned bribe, Lee re-approaches Blanco with a deal that he will not report on the organization's dealings in return for a fee. As Blanco pays well for Lee's un-reporting, Marcia becomes suspicious of Lee's wealth, but Lee denies any illegality in the acquisition of the money. Becoming increasingly confident of his control, Lee determines to acquire a larger share of the bribes by shaking down the gangsters. After learning that Number One, the head of the organization, is planning on opening a new gambling house, he threatens Blanco that he will print that information unless he gets a bigger share of money. Upon meeting Number One, Lee obtains the larger graft, but is warned that if the story gets published, he will be in danger. Feeling that Lee is untrustworthy, Collins agrees to marry fellow reporter Charles "Breezy" Russell. Consequently, Lee decides to go straight and leave the city with Marcia if she will marry him. She acquiesces, but "Breezy" publishes the gambling story, hoping to impress Marcia. The following morning as Lee and Marcia are getting ready to leave, "Breezy" shows up with his story in the newspaper. After Lee sees it, he decides to go to the bank to retrieve his money despite Marcia's pleas not to. Lee is followed and killed by gangsters. At his funeral, Lee is named as a hero. Marcia stays quiet, although she knows the truth.

== Cast ==
- Richard Barthelmess as Breckenridge 'Breck' Lee
- Fay Wray as Marcia Collins
- Regis Toomey as Charlie "Breezy" Russell
- Robert Elliott as City Editor Frank Carter
- Clark Gable as Louis J. Blanco
- Oscar Apfel as Managing Editor Ellis Wheeler
- Robert Gleckler as Larry Haynes, Sphinx Club Manager

Uncredited Roles

- Mickey Bennett as Arthur, Office Boy
- James P. Burtis as Cop
- Martin Cichy as Blanco's Bodyguard
- Bob Perry as Henchman in Haynes' club
- Lew Harvey as Henchman in "Number One's" office
- George Taylor as Henchman in "Number One's" office
- Frank Marlowe as Guard at "Number One's" office
- Herman Krumpfel as Breck's Tailor
- Frank McClure as Casino Patron
- Field Norton as Casino Patron
- Albert Petit as Casino Patron
- J. Carrol Naish as Phone Voice ("The Finger is on You")

== Preservation ==
A surviving feature it is preserved in the Library of Congress.
