= West Point of the Air =

1935 film by Richard Rosson

- Theatrical release poster
- Directed by: Richard Rosson
- Screenplay by: Frank Wead; Arthur J. Beckhard
- Story by: James Kevin McGuinness; John Monk Saunders
- Produced by: Monta Bell
- Starring: Wallace Beery; Robert Young; Lewis Stone; Maureen O'Sullivan
- Cinematography: Clyde De Vinna; Charles A. Marshall
- Edited by: Frank Sullivan
- Music by: Charles Maxwell
- Distributed by: Metro-Goldwyn-Mayer
- Release date: March 23, 1935
- Running time: 89 minutes
- Country: United States
- Language: English
- Budget: $591,000
- Box office: $1,317,000

West Point of the Air is a 1935 American drama film directed by Richard Rosson and starring Wallace Beery, Robert Young, Lewis Stone, Maureen O'Sullivan, Rosalind Russell, and Robert Taylor. The screenplay concerns pilot training in the U.S. Army Air Corps in the early 1930s. (Note: West Point of the Air was a showcase for an A list star such as Wallace Beery but also a bevy of up-and-coming actors including Robert Taylor, Rosalind Russell, Robert Young and Maureen O'Sullivan.)

== Plot ==
At Randolph Field, Texas, Master Sergeant "Big Mike" Stone (Wallace Beery) has aspirations for his son, "Little Mike" (Robert Young) to follow in his footsteps as an aviator. Following graduation from West Point, Little Mike, along with his best friend, Phil Carter (Russell Hardie), enter pilot training at Randolph Field, commanded by Phil's father, General Carter (Lewis Stone), but complications soon arise.

Little Mike has a childhood sweetheart, Phil's sister, "Skip" (Maureen O'Sullivan) but is also being pursued by divorcee Dare Marshall (Rosalind Russell). Returning from a late date with Dare the next morning, Little Mike's car causes Phil to crash during his solo flight, which ends with Phil losing a leg. Seeing what may happen after a crash, General Carter orders all the flying cadets into the air so they won't lose their nerve. Little Mike, blaming himself for his friend's accident, loses control during a flight check while landing in a cross-wind, destroying his landing gear and causing another aircraft flown by his friend "Jasky" Jaskarelli (Robert Taylor) to crash in flames. Big Mike takes to the sky to bring his son back safely but strikes him when Little Mike breaks down in hysterics. Big Mike is court-martialed and dishonorably discharged from the service.

Having lost his nerve and planning to resign from the army, Little Mike comes upon his father, now a drunk and toiling as a mechanic. Trying to help his son once again, Big Mike takes his place on a flare dropping mission flying his own aircraft, a beat up old war surplus airplane. The plane breaks up under the stress of a diving maneuver. Big Mike crashes into the water, and his son comes to his aid in a daring underwater rescue and proves his mettle. The Secretary of War recognizes both men's valor, reinstates Big Mike to his former rank, and allows Little Mike to graduate. Dare disapproves of Little Mike staying in the army, but he rejects her, realizing that Skip is his true love.

== Cast ==
As appearing in screen credits (main roles identified):

- Wallace Beery as "Big Mike" Stone
- Robert Young as "Little Mike" Stone
- Lewis Stone as General Carter
- Maureen O'Sullivan as "his daughter Skip"
- Russell Hardie as "her brother Phil"
- Rosalind Russell as Dare Marshall
- James Gleason as "Bags"
- Henry Wadsworth as Lieutenant Pettis
- Robert Taylor as Jaskarelli (Note: In West Point of the Air, Robert Taylor was cast in only his second film appearance.)
- Robert Livingston as Pippinger
- Frank Conroy as Captain Cannon

West Point of the Air featured numerous aerial scenes which were highlighted in the theatrical trailer.

- Adrian Morris as Randolph Air Field Instructor (uncredited)

== Production ==
West Point of the Air was filmed on location at Randolph Field near San Antonio, Texas in the spring of 1934. The film's aerial shots were a combination of live action footage, models, and cockpit mock-ups of Consolidated PT-3 flight trainers, and aircraft of an earlier vintage, Curtiss Model D (replica), Curtiss JN-4 and Fokker D.VII. Aerial photography was shot by noted aerial cinematographer Elmer Dyer with Hollywood film pilot Paul Mantz (uncredited) performing some of the aerial stunts. Although Mantz was in charge of the aerial portion of the film, Frank Clarke did the majority of the flying in his Travel Air Speedwing.

As aviation films in the 1930s were increasingly finding it difficult to create the spectacular crashes that were often a feature of earlier periods, not only was safety a factor but also the number of war-weary aircraft that had been the staple of the time, were becoming harder to find. A Fokker D. VII that had flown in Hell's Angels (1930), was refurbished by Mantz and appeared in West Point of the Air.

== Reception ==
Produced in an era of an America unprepared for war, and in the wake of the Air Corps' loss of prestige in the "Air Mail Fiasco" of the year before, West Point of the Air was recognized for its value as a "recruiting poster" for the military. The review in The New York Times, emphasized that aspect of the film, "The Hollywood cinema continues its arguments on behalf of preparedness in "West Point of the Air," which chants the glories of the military service and the importance of iron discipline." In a more recent review, Leonard Maltin remarked that, "Master Sergeant Beery pushes reluctant son Young through army air training for his own satisfaction. Good cast enlivens standard drama."

== Box office ==
According to MGM records the film earned $677,000 in the US and Canada and $640,000 elsewhere resulting in a profit of $262,000.
