= John Monk Saunders =

American novelist, screenwriter, film director, Oscar winner

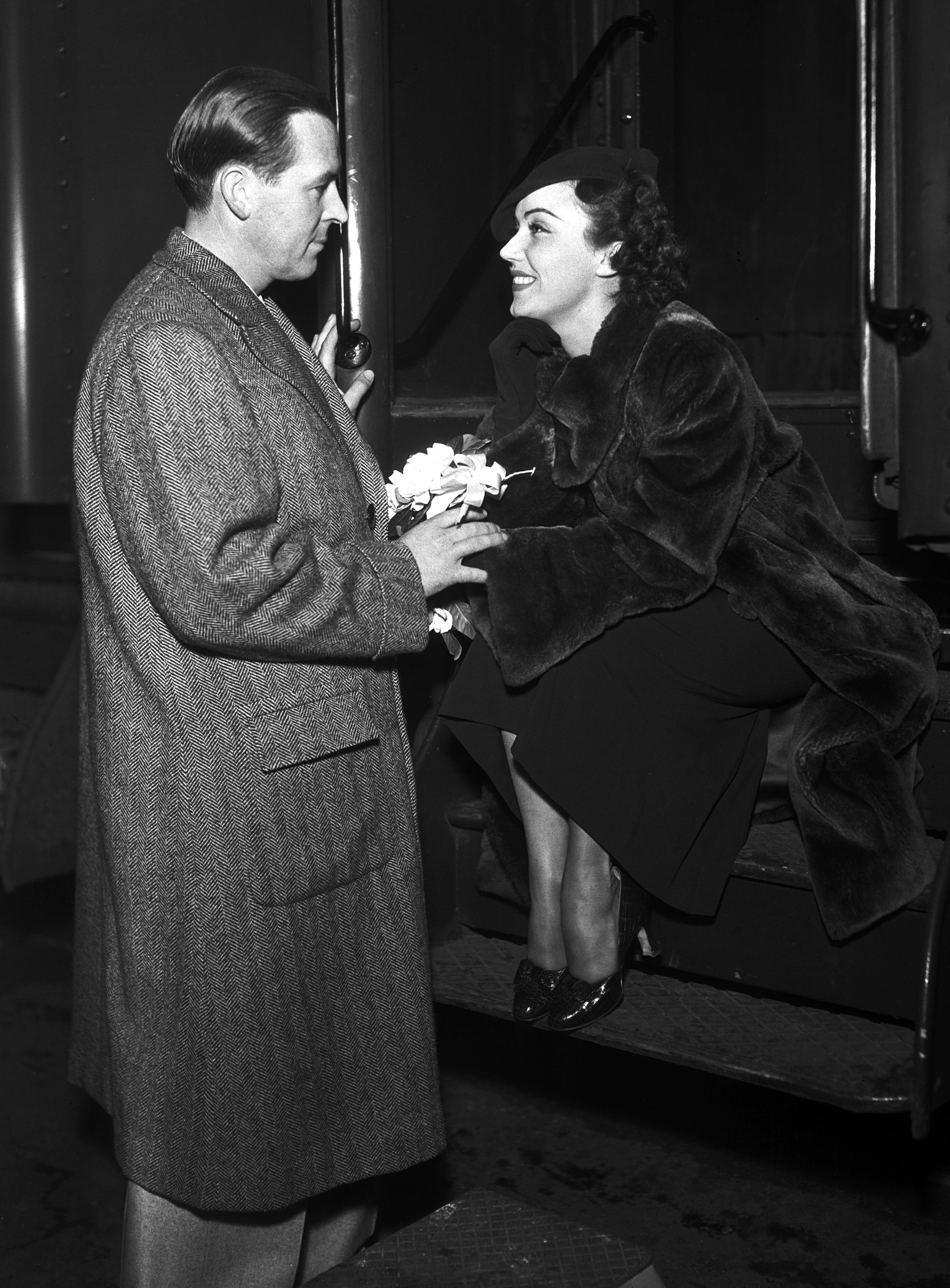
- Saunders with Fay Wray, 1930
- Born: November 22, 1897; Hinckley, Minnesota, U.S.
- Died: March 11, 1940 (aged 42); Fort Myers, Florida, U.S.
- Education: Broadway High School; University of Washington in Seattle; University of Oxford
- Occupations: Novelist; screenwriter; film director
- Spouses: Avis Hughes (m. 1922; div. 1927) Fay Wray (m. 1928; div. 1939)
- Children: 1
- Awards: Academy Award for Best Story (1930)

John Monk Saunders (November 22, 1897 – March 11, 1940) was an American novelist, screenwriter, and film director.

== Early life and career ==
Born in Hinckley, Minnesota, to Robert C. Saunders and Nannie Monk Saunders, his family (6 children) moved to Seattle, Washington in 1907 where his father served as US Attorney. John attended Broadway High School, where he excelled as both student and athlete. Saunders, a member of Sigma Chi Fraternity, received his education at University of Washington in Seattle where he was president of his freshman class and quarterback on the freshman football team. He served in the Air Service during World War I as a flight instructor in Florida, but was never able to secure a posting to France, a disappointment that frustrated him for the remainder of his life. After the University of Washington, he was a Rhodes Scholar at Oxford, entering in the fall of 1919 where he was the first American to attend Magdalen College. Saunders was a member of their championship swimming team and played on the Rugby squad. He completed his 3-year degree there in just 1 1/2 years. While at Oxford, he formed friendships with John Masefield and Rudyard Kipling. After graduation, he served as attaché at the American Relief Association in Vienna, Austria.

After the war he spent time in Paris then returned to Oxford, completing his master's degree in 1923. He worked as a journalist in the US, including stints with the Los Angeles Times and New York Tribune. Saunders began selling short stories to magazines such as Cosmopolitan and Liberty magazines and became editor of American magazine.

He first sold the movie rights to one of his stories in 1924, and in 1926, Famous Players–Lasky/Paramount purchased the rights to Saunders's unfinished novel about WWI pilots. Wings garnered $39,000 for the writer - the highest sum paid for film rights at that time - as well as the first Academy Award for Best Picture.

=== Screenwriter ===
Saunders's first screen credit was Too Many Kisses (1925), based on his story "A Maker of Gestures". This was followed by The Shock Punch (1925) based on his play.

In 1926 Famous Players–Lasky/Paramount purchased the screen rights to Saunders's unfinished novel about pilots in World War One for a then-record $39,000. The film, Wings (1927), became the first film to ever win an Academy Award for Best Picture.

He followed it with The Legion of the Condemned (1928), starring Gary Cooper.

Saunders's story "The Dock Walloper" was filmed as The Docks of New York (1928), Directed by Josef von Sternberg. He worked on the script for She Goes to War (1929)

The Dawn Patrol (1930), was based on his story "The Flight Commander". It starred Richard Barthelmess and Douglas Fairbanks Jr. Saunders won an Oscar for Best Story. On receipt of his award, he said, "This indeed is a crazy business where I am being sued for plagiarism on one hand and given the statuette for originality on the other".

Saunders published a series of short stories collectively referred to as "Nikki and Her War Birds" in Liberty magazine. In 1931, Saunders arranged these stories into his first complete novel called Single Lady.

Saunders wrote The Finger Points (1931), then The Last Flight (1931) which he adapted from Single Lady.

Saunders also wrote a play Nikki which was produced on Broadway with Fay Wray.

The Eagle and the Hawk (1933) was based on his story, "Death in the Morning". It starred Fredric March, Cary Grant and Carole Lombard.

Saunders wrote Ace of Aces (1933), adapting his story "Birds of Prey".

Devil Dogs of the Air (1935) was based on his story. His stories provided the basis for West Point of the Air (1935) and I Found Stella Parish (1935).

Saunders was one of several writers on the documentary film Conquest of the Air (UK, 1936), which he also co-directed.

He was credited for providing the idea for A Yank at Oxford (1938) and did uncredited work on Star of the Circus (1938). The Dawn Patrol was remade in 1938 starring Errol Flynn, Basil Rathbone and David Niven.

Saunders went to Virginia in 1938 to research a historical novel. He and his second wife separated that year, and Saunders was treated at a Virginia hospital for what was described as a nervous disorder.

== Personal life ==
Saunders was married to Avis Hughes, daughter of novelist Rupert Hughes (uncle of Howard Hughes), from 1922 to 1927. Later he married actress Fay Wray (1928–1939). Friend Gary Cooper served as his best man. Saunders and Wray had a daughter, Susan Cary Saunders (Riskin).

In 1934, Saunders was involved in a highly publicized fist fight with actor Herbert Marshall, a veteran of WWI. This led to Saunders losing work opportunities and condemnation from the Hollywood social scene.

== Death ==
Saunders suffered from alcoholism most of his adult life. Despite care by a nurse from Johns Hopkins hospital, Saunders hanged himself at a Fort Myers, Florida, beach cottage on March 11, 1940.

== Selected writings ==
=== Stories ===
- "A Maker of Gestures"
- "The Shock Punch"
- "The Dock Walloper"
- "Flight Commander"
- "Death in the Morning"
- "The Bird of Prey"

=== Novels ===
- Wings (1927)
- Single Lady (1931)

=== Plays ===
- Nikki (1931)

=== Films ===
- Too Many Kisses (1925)
- The Shock Punch (1925)
- Wings (1927)
- The Legion of the Condemned (1928)
- The Docks of New York (1928)
- She Goes to War (1929)
- The Dawn Patrol (1930)
- The Finger Points (1931)
- The Last Flight (1931)
- The Eagle and the Hawk (1933)
- Ace of Aces (1933)
- Devil Dogs of the Air (1935)
- West Point of the Air (1935)
- I Found Stella Parish (1936)
- Conquest of the Air (1936)
- The Dawn Patrol (1938)
- A Yank at Oxford (1938)
- Star of the Circus (1938)
