= A Yank at Oxford =

1938 comedy-drama film

- Theatrical release poster
- Directed by: Jack Conway
- Written by: Roland Pertwee; John Monk Saunders; Leon Gordon; Sidney Gilliat; Michael Hogan; Angus MacPhail; John Paddy Carstairs
- Screenplay by: Malcolm Stuart Boylan; Walter Ferris; George Oppenheimer; Frank Wead; F. Scott Fitzgerald
- Produced by: Michael Balcon
- Starring: Robert Taylor; Lionel Barrymore; Maureen O'Sullivan; Vivien Leigh; Edmund Gwenn
- Cinematography: Harold Rosson
- Edited by: Margaret Booth; Charles Frend
- Music by: Hubert Bath; Edward Ward
- Production company: Metro-Goldwyn-Mayer
- Distributed by: Loew's Inc
- Release date: 18 February 1938
- Running time: 102 minutes
- Countries: United Kingdom; United States
- Language: English
- Budget: $1,374,000 or £262,435
- Box office: $2,736,000

A Yank at Oxford is a 1938 comedy-drama film directed by Jack Conway and starring Robert Taylor, Lionel Barrymore, Maureen O'Sullivan, Vivien Leigh and Edmund Gwenn. The screenplay was written by John Monk Saunders and Leon Gordon. The film was produced by MGM-British at Denham Studios.

A Yank at Oxford was Vivien Leigh and Robert Taylor's first film appearance together; they would later appear as the romantic lead couple in the remake of Waterloo Bridge (1940). Before this film, Taylor was seen as the "romantic love interest" and thus as a 1930s equivalent to Rudolph Valentino.

== Plot ==
A cocky American athlete named Lee Sheridan receives a scholarship to attend Cardinal College, University of Oxford in 1937. At first, Lee is reluctant to go to the college owing to his father, Dan's, limited income, but he finally does attend. Once in England, Lee brags about his athletic triumphs to Paul Beaumont, Wavertree, and Ramsey on the train to Oxford. Annoyed, they trick Lee into getting off the train at the wrong stop. Lee, however, does make his way to Oxford where the students attempt to trick him again, this time into thinking that he is getting a grand reception. Seeing through the deception, he follows the prankster impersonating the Dean and after chasing him is thrown off and ends up kicking the real Dean of Cardinal (Edmund Gwenn) before retreating. This begins a contentious relationship between them when Lee reports to apologize.

Lee considers leaving Oxford but stays on after being convinced by Scatters, his scout. Lee meets Elsa Craddock, a married woman who "helps" the new campus students, and starts a relationship with Paul Beaumont's sister Molly. Lee makes the track team by outpacing other runners while wearing a tweed suit, cap and gown. Just when he begins to fit in, he refuses to rest during a crucial track meet against Cambridge and pushes Paul, his replacement in a relay race, out of the way in his zeal to win, silencing the appalled audience.

That evening he is hazed with the traditional Oxford funeral march and debagging, to the Dean's delight. Scatters explains that the students do not consider his win a victory, and assures him there is no disgrace.

Lee goes to confront Paul in a pub—out of bounds to students—and finds him in a private booth with Elsa. He starts a fight with Paul but Wavertree warns them of the arrival of the "Bullers" the Oxford University police. Lee and Paul run and Lee punches the Buller. Paul is called before the Dean, who fines him and warns him for hitting the Buller and associating with Elsa. Paul reveals it was Lee who did it, but Lee is happy to let Paul take the rap. Lee is soon the favorite of Paul's old friends. Months pass. Molly goes out with Lee, and Paul sees Elsa secretly.

Lee begins rowing for Oxford University Boat Club and is selected Cardinal's stroke in the bumps race. He tries to make amends to Paul after they win the race, but Paul rejects the offer of friendship. Paul breaks it off with a tearful Elsa, who begins her seduction routine with another student as soon as she enters the shop, but is interrupted by her husband. She goes in search of Paul, pursued by Craddock. Lee hides Elsa in his own room, and finding them, the Dean sends Lee down from Oxford. A crowd of Cardinal students takes him to the train station where Lee's father, Dan, has just arrived to see him row against Cambridge, not knowing of Lee's expulsion. He does not believe it when Lee tells him that he has been having an affair with Elsa given Lee's effusive letters about Molly.

Dan meets with Molly—who never received Lee's phone calls—and the two devise a plan to get Lee back into college. Dan convinces Elsa to talk to the Dean. After flirting with the Dean and telling him that Lee was only hiding her from Wavertree, Lee is allowed back into Oxford. Wavertree, who has spent the entire story trying to be expelled so he can come into an inheritance from a relative whose career at Oxford ended by being sent down, is crushed when he receives only a minor punishment. Paul makes friends with Lee. Oxford wins The Boat Race, and Paul faints. The Craddocks move to Aldershot, near the Officers Club.

== Cast ==
- Robert Taylor as Lee Sheridan
- Lionel Barrymore as Dan Sheridan
- Maureen O'Sullivan as Molly Beaumont
- Vivien Leigh as Elsa Craddock
- Edmund Gwenn as Dean of Cardinal
- Griffith Jones as Paul Beaumont
- C. V. France as Dean Snodgrass
- Edward Rigby as Scatters
- Morton Selten as Cecil Davidson, Esq.
- Claude Gillingwater as Ben Dalton
- Tully Marshall as Cephas
- Walter Kingsford as Dean Williams
- Robert Coote as Wavertree
- Peter Croft as Ramsey
- Noel Howlett as Tom Craddock
- Ronald Shiner as bicycle repairman (uncredited)
- Jon Pertwee as extra (uncredited, his first film)
- Nicholas Parsons as extra (uncredited his first film debut)

== Production ==
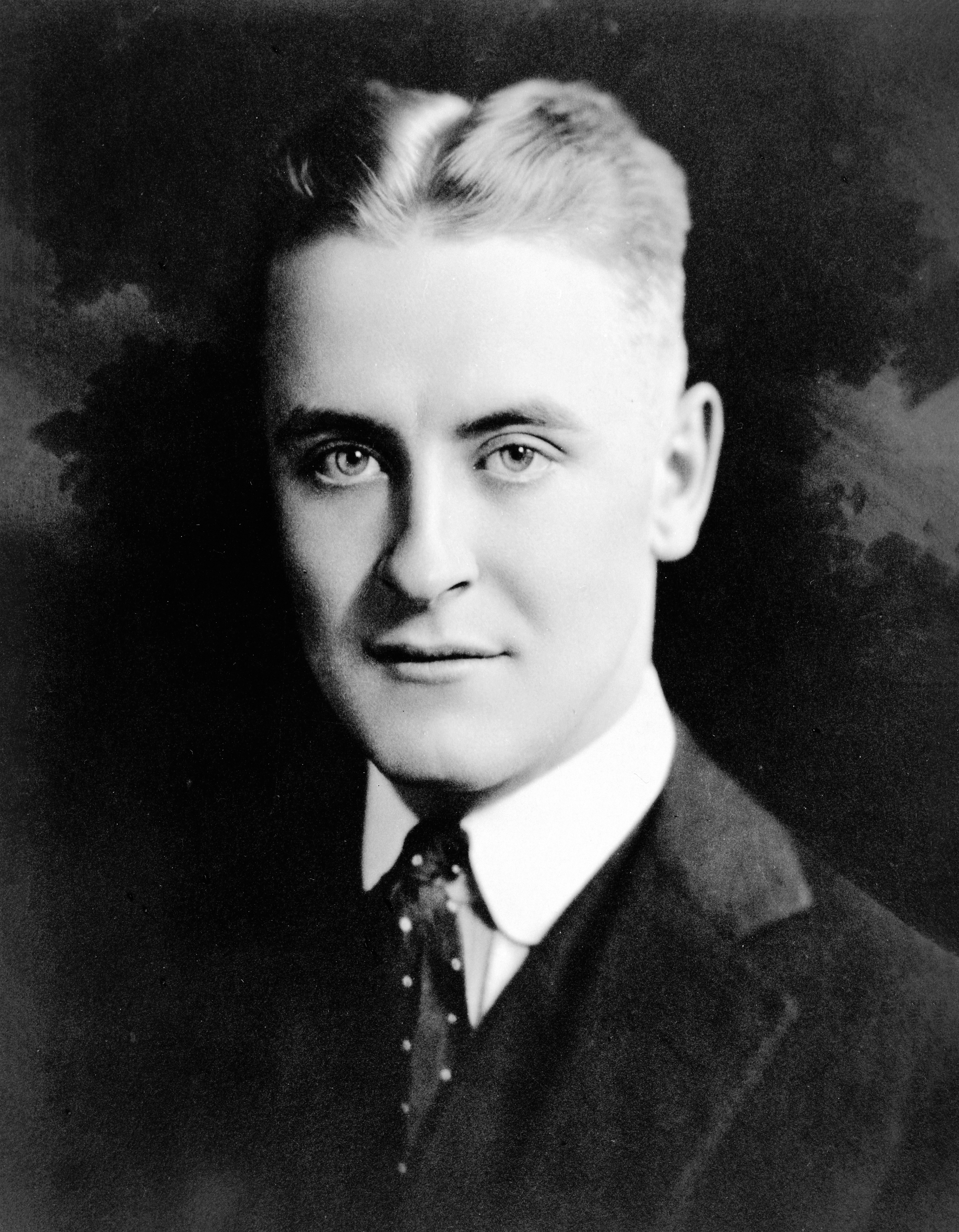
F. Scott Fitzgerald spent three weeks working on the script.

A Yank at Oxford was MGM's first British production, with MGM head Louis B. Mayer taking a personal interest in casting. He visited the set several times. British playwright Roland Pertwee was one of several uncredited writers, and F. Scott Fitzgerald also spent three weeks working on the script, touching up rough points and adding pieces of dialogue. Mayer and Balcon later got into a fight on set, within earshot of Vivien Leigh and Maureen O'Sullivan, that led to Balcon resigning as the producer.

To the surprise of other actors, Taylor was able to do all of the physical scenes himself, especially running and rowing. He had competed in track and field as a student at Doane College.

At first, Mayer was reluctant to cast the then little known Vivien Leigh in the role of Elsa Craddock, until persuaded by Michael Balcon, who stated that she was already living in Britain and it would cost much more to fly someone else out to England. During the filming of A Yank at Oxford, Leigh gained a reputation for being "difficult" to work with. According to her biographer Alexander Walker, Leigh felt judged by Maureen O'Sullivan, whom she had befriended years earlier at school, because O'Sullivan was happily married and Leigh was in the midst of an affair with Laurence Olivier and awaiting word of a divorce from her first husband, Leigh Holman. Therefore, the relationship was "strained." Also Leigh had developed a foot problem whereupon she asked to go to London to seek treatment. As Leigh was preparing to leave, the wardrobe department cut a hole in her shoes so that her toe would be at ease.

According to Leigh, she was forced to pay for her own shoes and demanded that MGM help her make some of the payments. On the other hand, MGM said that they bought all of Leigh's shoes and she didn't have to pay a penny on the film. Because of the dispute, her manager, Alexander Korda, sent Leigh a message stating that if her behaviour did not improve, he would not renew her contract. Leigh's behaviour did shape up and her contract was renewed.

Some film historians believe A Yank at Oxford was instrumental in Vivien Leigh being noticed by David O. Selznick for Gone with the Wind. Regardless of her prior behavior, Leigh managed to make her way through the filming of A Yank at Oxford without much additional acrimony and made an impression on her costar, Robert Taylor. Taylor returned to Hollywood talking about the great English actress he had worked with and suggested to Selznick, who was still searching for his Scarlett O'Hara, that they ought to look at her.

== Reception ==
A Yank at Oxford was reviewed by Frank S. Nugent in The New York Times as a "pleasant spoof." He wrote that the film "turns out to be an uncommonly diverting show. It can't be the story, for we've read the one about the old college spirit before. ... It must be the accents, the caps and gown, the cycles and the remarkably credible chaps Metro hired to play dean and tutor, scout and students. When the camera turns upon them you can jolly well smell the fog, you know."

The film review in Variety concentrated on Taylor's appeal. "Robert Taylor brings back from Oxford an entertaining rah-rah film which is full of breathless quarter-mile dashes, heartbreaking boat race finishes and surefire sentiment—Metro's first British-made film under Hollywood supervision and with Hollywood principals and director."

A Yank at Oxford and A Yank at Eton (1942), portrayed the British in a mainly positive light, and set the scene for other films that were financially successful in both the United States and the United Kingdom during the war years. The film was later parodied in the Laurel and Hardy film A Chump at Oxford (1940) and remade as Oxford Blues (1984) .

=== Box office ===
According to MGM records, the film earned $1,291,000 in the US and Canada and $1,445,000 elsewhere resulting in a profit of $513,000.

== See also ==
- Lionel Barrymore filmography
