= Devil Dogs of the Air =

1935 film by Lloyd Bacon

- Theatrical release poster
- Directed by: Lloyd Bacon
- Written by: Malcolm Stuart Boylan; Earl Baldwin; John Monk Saunders (original story)
- Produced by: Hal B. Wallis; Jack L. Warner (Executive producer); Lou Edelman (Associate producer)
- Starring: James Cagney; Pat O'Brien
- Cinematography: Arthur Edeson
- Edited by: William Clemens
- Music by: Leo F. Forbstein
- Production company: Cosmopolitan Productions
- Distributed by: Warner Bros. Pictures
- Release date: February 9, 1935 (US)
- Running time: 86 minutes
- Country: United States
- Language: English
- Budget: $385,000 (estimated)
- Box office: $1,685,000 (worldwide rentals)

Devil Dogs of the Air (a.k.a. Flying Marines) is a 1935 American action comedy-drama film directed by Lloyd Bacon and starring James Cagney and Pat O'Brien, playing similar roles as close friends after making their debut as a "buddy team" in Here Comes the Navy. (Note: The film's tagline was: "Bigger Than Here Comes The Navy.") Devil Dogs of the Air was the second of nine features that James Cagney and Pat O'Brien made together. (Note: Cagney and O'Brien were lifelong close friends in real life.) The film's storyline was adapted from a novel by John Monk Saunders.

It was produced by Cosmopolitan Productions with distribution by Warner Bros. Pictures who released it on February 9, 1935.

== Plot ==
Lieut. Bill Brannigan learns friend and hotshot pilot Thomas Jefferson "Tommy" O'Toole, the self-styled "world's greatest aviator", is joining the USMC Reserve Aviator training program. O'Toole arrives at San Diego and promptly starts to move in on Brannigan's love interest, Betty Roberts, the daughter of the owner of the nearby Happy Landings Cafe. In typical cocky fashion, O'Toole antagonizes nearly everyone else.

Although not temperamentally suited for the military, Tommy completes primary training and after surviving an accident he caused by running out of fuel, eventually realizes that he is willing to change.

Bill is assigned as his instructor, and on the first flight together, when Tommy begins to do some stunt flying, the aircraft has to be abandoned when it catches on fire. Bill bales out, but Tommy defies orders and lands the aircraft, making him a hero. Tommy performs his first solo flight perfectly and then browbeats Betty into attending the solo flight party with him. Bill is not amused.

After a competition in the air with his friend Brannigan flying together, a midair emergency takes place, but it is Bill who saves the aircraft. Tommy makes a good landing, and finds Betty waiting for him. Although their friendship is restored, Bill realizes that Tommy has won Betty and arranges a transfer to another base.

== Cast ==
- James Cagney as Thomas Jefferson "Tommy" O'Toole
- Pat O'Brien as Lieut. William R. "Bill" Brannigan
- Margaret Lindsay as Betty Roberts
- Frank McHugh as "Crash" Kelly
- John Arledge as "Mac" Macintosh
- Helen Lowell as Ma Roberts
- Robert Barrat as Commandant
- Russell Hicks as Captain
- William B. Davidson (as William Davidson) as Adjutant, a captain
- Ward Bond as Jimmy, senior instructor
- Bill Elliott (as Gordon Elliott) as Instructor
- Olive Jones as Mrs. Brown
- David Newell as Lieut. Brown
- Helen Flint as Mrs. Johnson
- Harry Seymour as Officer
- Newton House as Officer
- Ralph Nye as Officer
- Selmer Jackson as Officer
- Bill Beggs as Officer
- Robert Spencer as Bob
- Bud Flanagan as Student
- Don Turner as Student
- Dick French as Student
- Charles Sherlock as Student
- Carlyle Blackwell Jr.as Messenger

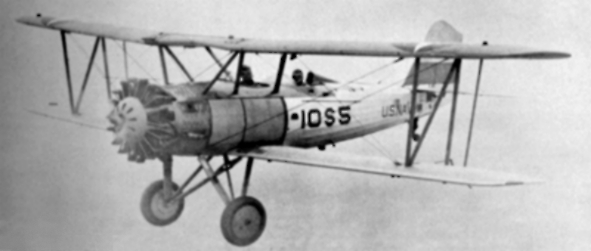
Vought O2U-4 Corsair

== Production ==
Principal photography starting on October 1, 1934, was based at the US Naval Base San Diego. Paul Mantz did the aerial stunts for Cagney. One of the featured squadrons stationed there, Marine Attack Squadron 231 (VMA-231) after returning to San Diego in 1928, had traded in its World War I-era O2B-1s for new Curtiss F8C-1s and F8C-3s, which were soon redesignated OC-1s and OC-2s. Equipped with Vought O3U-6 Corsairs, the squadron continued to operate from San Diego and participated in the annual Fleet Problems, operating from the carriers USS Langley, USS Ranger, and USS Saratoga at different times. Shortly after receiving the F8C/OCs, the squadron, along with VO-10M took part in the filming of the 1929 movie Flight and later, prominently appeared in the Devil Dogs of the Air.

The rare U.S. Marine Corps Curtiss RC-1 air ambulance, A-8864, made an appearance in the film. Other unusual types that appear in the film include:

- Loening OL-8 two-seat amphibian biplane
- Travel Air D-4000 civilian stunt biplane
- Vought O2U Corsair two-seat scout biplane
- Boeing F4B single-seat pursuit biplane
- Ford Trimotor multi-passenger transport
- Douglas Dolphin

Maneuvers (wargames) by the United States Navy and the USMC are the actual "stars" of the movie. In the film, the USN represented the BLUE Force while the enemy was the BROWN Force. (Note: The BROWN Force in WAR PLAN ORANGE actually was the ORANGE Force, Imperial Japan.)

== Reception ==
Released in an era of patriotic films with overt propaganda themes that set the scene for war preparations, Devil Dogs of the Air received a mildly appreciative public acceptance. Although it had a major release in 1935, the film was re-released in 1941, just before America's entry into World War II, again finding a receptive audience. Critic Leonard Maltin described it as a "tiresome potboiler with Marine Air Corps rivalry between Cagney and O'Brien. Their personalities and good stunt-flying scenes are the only saving grace." Mainly considered hackneyed, it was best considered an aviation film and today, represents an authentic look at the period.

=== Box office ===
According to Warner Bros records, Devil Dogs of the Air earned $1,185,000 domestically and $504,000 foreign.
