= Nieuport 28 =

French WW1 fighter aircraft

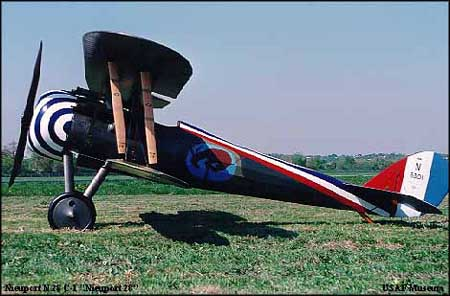
- Reproduction of the Nieuport 28C-1 at the National Museum of the United States Air Force

General information
- Type: Fighter
- Manufacturer: Nieuport
- Designer: Gustave Delage
- Status: retired
- Primary users: United States Army Air Service Aéronautique Militaire
- Number built: about 300

History
- Introduction date: March 1918
- First flight: 14 June 1917

The Nieuport 28 C.1, a French biplane fighter aircraft flown during World War I, was built by Nieuport and designed by Gustave Delage. Owing its lineage to the successful line of sesquiplane fighters that included the Nieuport 17, the Nieuport 28 continued a similar design philosophy of a lightweight and highly maneuverable aircraft.

By the time the Nieuport 28 was available, the SPAD XIII had been chosen to equip the escadrilles de chasse of the Aéronautique Militaire for 1918, and this fighter was also the first choice for the projected American "pursuit" squadrons. In the event, a shortage of SPADs led to Nieuport 28s being issued to four American squadrons between March and August 1918, becoming the first aircraft to see operational service with an American fighter squadron.

Nieuport 28s saw considerable post-war service: in particular 50 from a later production run were shipped to America, and as well as army and naval service these found civilian use, especially in Hollywood films.

== Development ==
=== Background and origins ===
By the middle of 1917, it was obvious that the Nieuport 17 and its developments, such as the Nieuport 24bis, could provide only moderate performance gains over the standard model and were unable to keep pace with the latest German fighters. The Nieuport 17 line was already being supplanted in French service by the SPAD S.VII, as quickly as supplies of the Hispano-Suiza engine would allow. It had become apparent that the basic sesquiplane "v-strut" layout was approaching the limits of its development.

The Nieuport 28 design advanced the concept of the lightly built, highly maneuverable rotary engined fighter typified by the Nieuport 17 to the more demanding conditions of the times. Bowers refers to it as being "an excellent example of the step-by-step evolution of a single basic design to its point of ultimate development and then its transition into a new model to meet changing requirements".

=== Prototypes ===
During 1917 the Nieuport company experimented with a number of new designs, including monoplanes, biplanes and triplanes. None of these types achieved production status and never received an official military designation, but the results of tests provided information later used in future Nieuport fighters, including the 28.

Several prototypes of the new fighter were constructed. Three dihedral settings for the top wing were tried, including a flat wing, and one with marked dihedral that rested very close to the top of the front fuselage. Production aircraft featured an intermediate configuration, which involved a slight dihedral in the upper wing and taller cabane struts, providing room to accommodate a second machine gun, mounted under the wing's center section.

Additional prototypes based on the design of the N28 were built to test various features of the Nieuport 29, including its wooden monocoque fuselage, and alternate engine installations, such as the 300 hp (220 kW) Hispano-Suiza 8Fb, 170 hp (130 kW) Le Rhône 9R, 275 hp Lorraine-Dietrich 8Bd, and 200 hp (150 kW) Clerget 11E.

== Design ==
The Nieuport 28's design featured several improvements over the 27, including the adoption of a more powerful engine, a twin-machine gun armament, and a new wing structure. For the first time, a production Nieuport fighter was fitted with conventional two-spar wings, top and bottom, in place of the sesquiplane "v-strut" layout of the earlier Nieuports. Both wings featured elliptical wingtips, instead of the angular raked tips common to Nieuport's earlier designs. The upper wing was built in two sections, joined together over the fuselage center-line. The leading edge of both wings was laminated with plywood. Ailerons were fitted to the lower wings only and controlled via torque tubes. To provide a more streamlined profile, the fuselage was longer and slimmer, so narrow that its twin Vickers machine guns were offset to port, one between the cabane struts and one just outboard of them. The design of the tail unit closely followed that of the Nieuport 27.

== Operational history ==
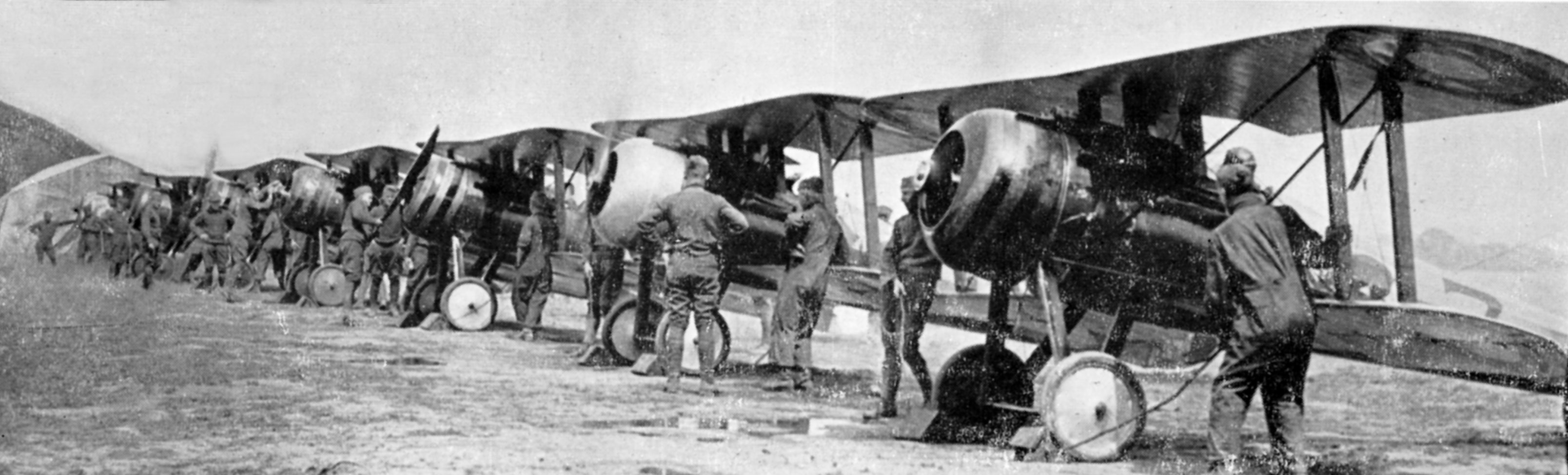
95th Aero Squadron Nieuport 28s starting on a patrol

By early 1918, when the first production examples of the Nieuport 28 became available, the SPAD S.XIII was already firmly established as the standard French fighter, and the Nieuport 28 was "surplus" from the French point of view. The United States Army Air Service was desperately short of fighters to equip its projected "pursuit" (fighter) squadrons. Since the SPAD S.XIIIs the Americans wanted were unavailable due to engine shortages, the Nieuport was offered to the American Expeditionary Force (AEF) in the interim.

A total of 297 Nieuport 28s were purchased by the Americans (none of our sources make it clear if this refers to the initial order or includes Nieuport 28A trainers accepted from the late 1918 contract). The 94th Aero Squadron, 95th Aero Squadron received the initial allotments, starting in March 1918. Four AEF pursuit squadrons: the 27th Aero Squadron, 94th, 95th and 147th Aero Squadrons, flew Nieuport 28s operationally for periods between March and August 1918.

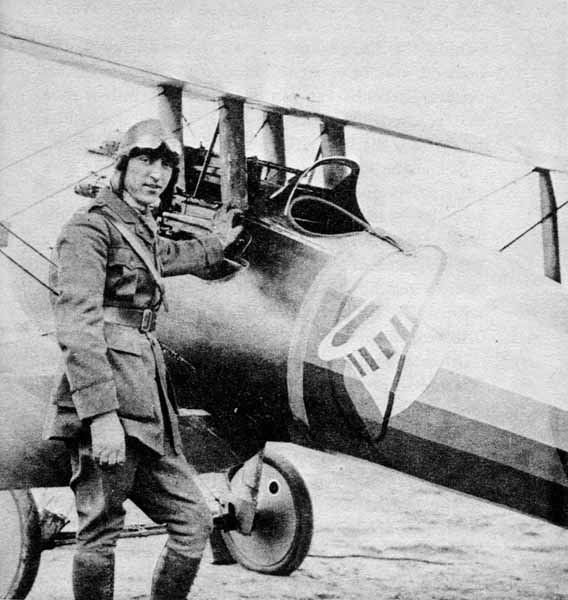
Rickenbacker with his Nieuport 28 – note offset guns

The factory delivered the Nieuport 28s to the Americans in mid-February 1918 without armament. The AEF had no spare Vickers machine guns, so that the first flights were unarmed training flights for pilots to familiarize themselves with the handling and performance of the new type. When deliveries of Vickers guns to the American squadrons finally started in mid-March, and until sufficient guns had been received for all of the fighters to be equipped, some aircraft were flown on patrol with only one machine gun fitted.

On 14 April 1918, the second armed patrol of an AEF fighter unit resulted in two victories when Lieutenants Alan Winslow and Douglas Campbell (the first American-trained ace) of the 94th Aero Squadron each downed an enemy aircraft over their own airfield at Gengoult. Several well-known World War I American fighter pilots, including the 26-victory ace, Captain Eddie Rickenbacker, began their operational careers on the Nieuport 28. Quentin Roosevelt (the son of former U.S. president Theodore Roosevelt) was shot down and killed flying the type.

The 94th and 95th had the task of dealing with the type's teething troubles. Initially undercarriages failed on landing – this was corrected by using heavier bracing wire. The Nieuport 28's 160 hp Gnome 9N rotary engine and fuel system proved to be unreliable and prone to fires. Field improvements to fuel lines, and increased familiarity of the American pilots (and their ground crews) with the requirements of monosoupape engines reduced these problems, but the definitive solution adopted was simply not completely filling the reserve fuel tank, a move which came at the expense of range. More seriously, a structural problem emerged – during a sharp pull out from a steep dive, the plywood leading edge of the top wing could break away, taking the fabric with it. Although the pilots of the 94th and the 95th appreciated the maneuverability and good handling of the Nieuport, and were reasonably happy with its general performance, their confidence in the fighter's structural integrity was shaken.

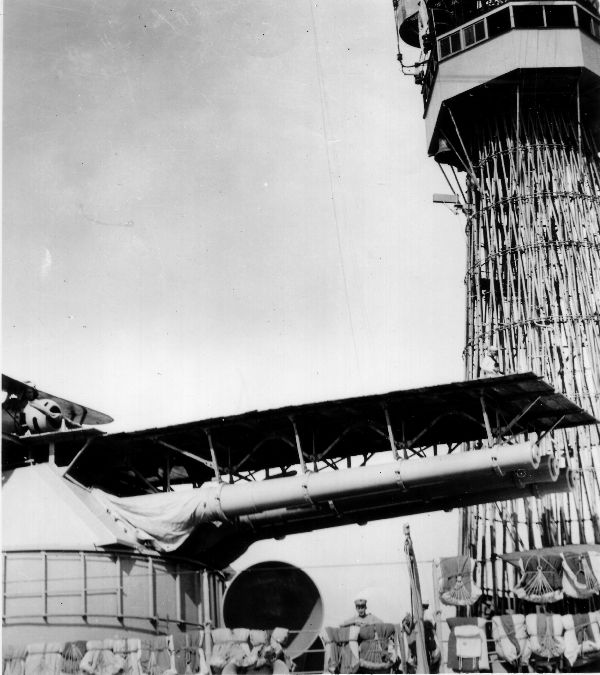
U.S. Navy Nieuport 28 on specially built platform mounted above the forward turret of USS Arizona

The 27th and 147th Aero Squadrons arrived at the front three months later, starting combat operations on 2 June 1918. In July 1918, the 94th and 95th Aero Squadrons received their first SPAD XIIIs and some of their surviving Nieuport 28s were then transferred to the 27th and 147th Aero Squadrons. By the end of August 1918, all four American squadrons were fully outfitted with SPAD XIIIs. The pilots of the 94th and 95th Aero Squadrons welcomed the SPADs, although the 27th and 147th Aero Squadrons were much less enthusiastic about the change. The Nieuport 28 certainly possessed superior maneuverability to its SPAD replacement. (Note: The pilots of the 27th and 147th Aero Squadrons, who had been forewarned about, but had not experienced the wing fabric detachment problem, were "heartbroken" in losing aircraft that had "performed perfectly". Author and historian Harold Hartney, in his 1940 account of the AEF, noted in his description of 147th's reaction, "... and now another catastrophe befell the squadron – they took away our beloved Nieuports and gave us 220 hp gear driven SPADs.")

Twelve Army Nieuports were transferred to the U.S. Navy to be flown from launching platforms mounted on the forward turrets of eight battleships, in a similar manner to the Sopwith Camel 2F.1s embarked at this time by the Grand Fleet of the Royal Navy. Similarly, they were fitted with hydrovanes as a means of mitigating the dangers of a water landing (ditching), and flotation gear, inflated using compressed air, to prevent the aircraft from sinking.

=== Nieuport 28A ===
During late 1918, about the time that the type was withdrawn from front line use, the United States Army placed an order for an additional 600 improved Nieuport 28s, which were given the American designation 28A. Although these were mainly intended as advanced trainers, early problems with the SPAD S.XIII in American service meant that the possibility of re-introducing the Nieuport fighters into the operational squadrons was not discounted, and provision was made for the installation of twin M1917/M1918 Marlin guns, mounted side by side under the center section.

The Nieuport 28A was to feature an improved upper wing leading edge structure and a redesigned fuel system, correcting faults in the initial production batch. As the Nieuport company were preoccupied with later types, production was undertaken by Lioré et Olivier who had built 170 Nieuport 28As and parts for another 100 by the end of the war, when the remainder of the order was cancelled.

=== Postwar ===
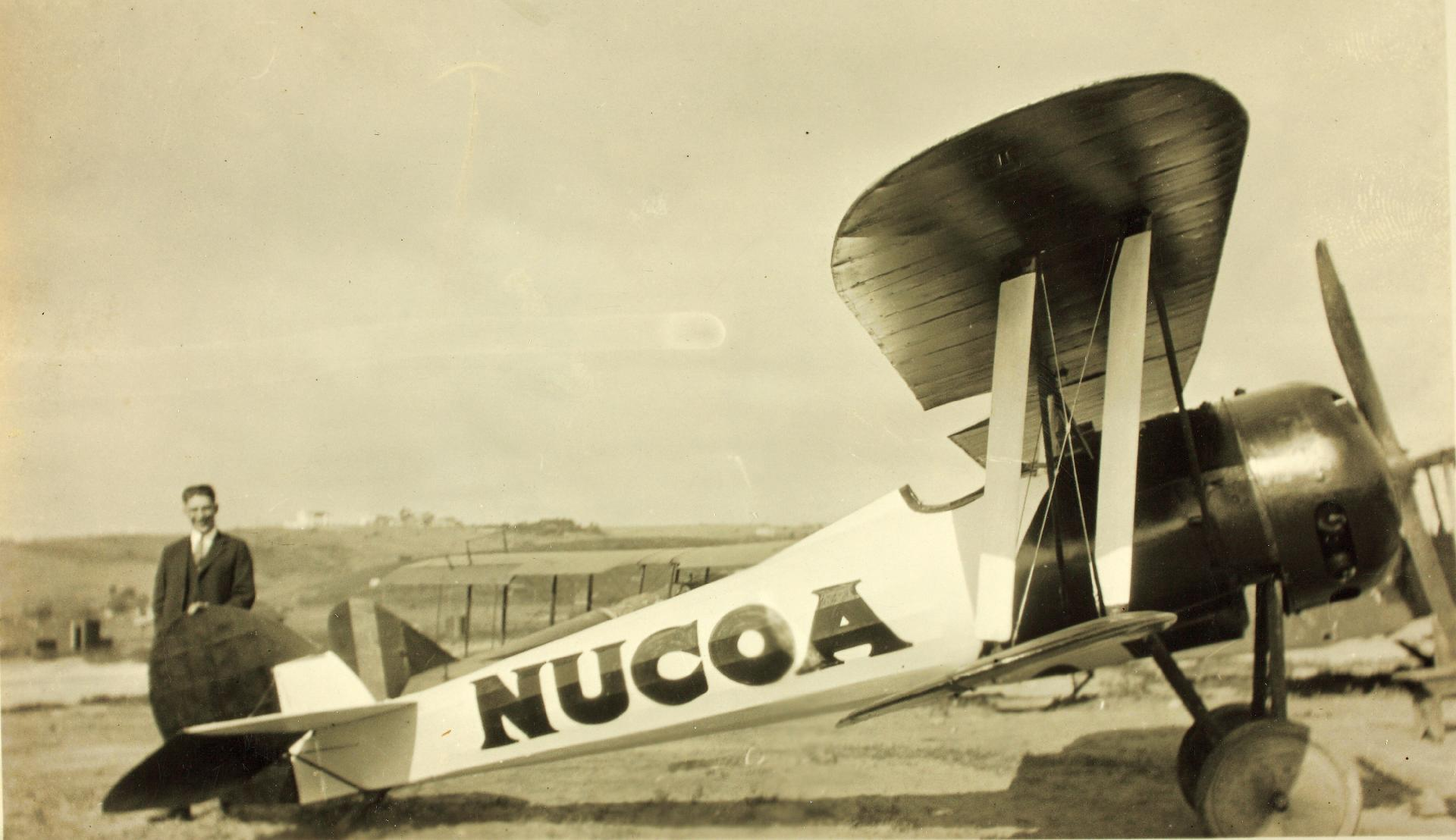
Nieuport 28A advertising Nucoa margarine after the war in the US

Postwar, approximately 50 new Nieuport 28As were shipped to the U.S. During the 1920s, Nieuport 28s were also in service with various air forces; Switzerland obtained 15, while Argentina received a couple of aircraft. Switzerland acquired its examples in 1919, and continued to fly the type throughout the 1920s, retiring their last Nieuport 28s from active service in 1930.

The type also found its way into civilian use. Several were used for aerial races; Nieuport 28 racers were often modified by reducing the wing span by up to five feet and replacing the parallel wing struts with a single I-shaped strut.

During the same period, a number of Nieuport 28s made their way to Hollywood where they appeared in the movies, The Dawn Patrol (1930), as well as its remake in 1938, Ace of Aces (1933) and Men with Wings (1938). The Nieuport 28s appeared in several later films set during World War I, including the Lafayette Escadrille (1958).

== Surviving aircraft ==
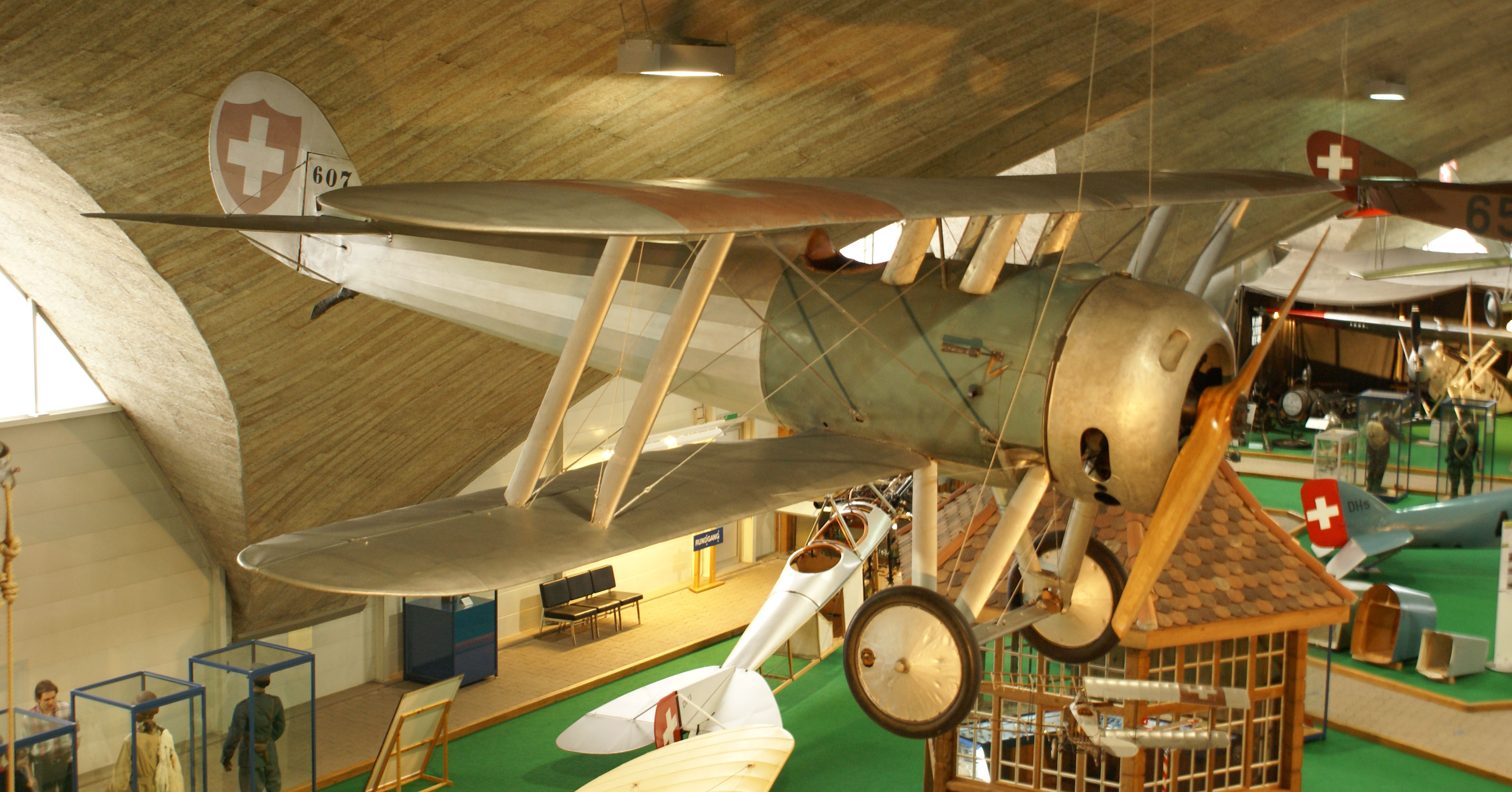
The Swiss Air Force's 688 served from 1921 to 1922 and is now in the Flieger Flab Museum.

As well as the replicas, a number of original surviving aircraft are found in museum collections worldwide. Original airframes are located in the Flieger Flab Museum in Dübendorf, and the Swiss Museum of Transport in Lucerne, Switzerland, a U.S. Navy Nieuport 28 at the National Naval Aviation Museum in Pensacola, Florida, the San Diego Air and Space Museum, and the Smithsonian's Steven F. Udvar-Hazy Center of the National Air and Space Museum, (Note: N4123A/8 (cn 1918-1958E) was donated by aviation enthusiast and entrepreneur Cole Palen, after having flown the aircraft for decades at the Old Rhinebeck Aerodrome, a "living" museum of vintage aircraft.)

The only airworthy example of the type is on display as of September 2023 at the American Heritage Museum in Hudson, Massachusetts following a two-year restoration by Mikael Carlson in Sebbarp, Sweden. This aircraft was owned by Frank Tallman and Paul Mantz of Tallmantz Aviation for Hollywood film productions from the 1930's until the 1960's before being sold at auction in 1968 to veteran race car driver Jim Hall for $14,500. It crashed during an event at the museum, but museum officials have stated their intent to repair the plane.

== Replicas ==
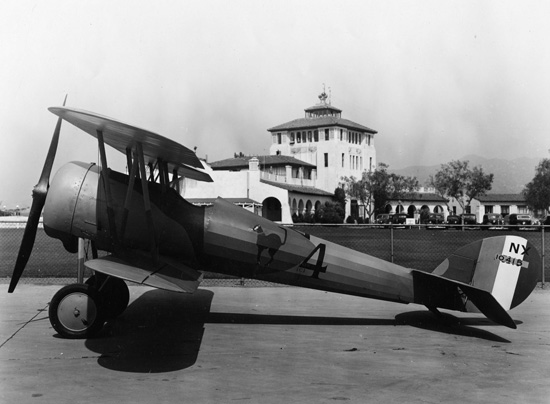
Garland-Lincoln LF-1

In the early 1930s, as the supply of original Nieuport 28s diminished, the Garland-Lincoln LF-1 (Lincoln-Flagg-1) was built in Glendale, California specifically to represent a generic World War I fighter for movie stunt work. While very similar in general appearance, the LF-1 was shorter than a genuine "28", had a steel tube framework, a one-piece upper wing without dihedral, and was fitted with a more powerful 200 hp (149 kW) Wright J-4-B radial engine. A Garland-Lincoln LF-1 (N12237) was featured in Hell in the Heavens (1934), Dawn Patrol (mixed in with authentic Nieuport 28s) (1938), and Men with Wings (1938). It was later used by Frank Tallman and Paul Mantz for other film and television work.

In more recent times, the Nieuport 28 has become a favorite subject for homebuilders wishing to recreate a World War 1 fighter, as its wood construction (some replicas substitute a metal tube fuselage), light weight and availability of modern engines such as the Rotec R3600 nine-cylinder radial, have led to number of replicas being offered as kits.As of 2012, a number of home-built replicas have taken to the air.

Reproductions are found at the National Museum of the United States Air Force, the Stampe et Vertongen Museum in Belgium, and at the Airbase Arizona Museum of the Commemorative Air Force at Falcon Field (Arizona), near Mesa, AZ. A flying replica in Eddie Rickenbaker's colors is found at the Great War Flying Museum, Brampton Airport in Caledon, Ontario, Canada.

== Operators ==
Argentina

- Argentine Air Force (2 aircraft)

France

- Aéronautique Militaire

Switzerland

- Swiss Air Force (15 aircraft)

United States

- United States Army Air Service
  - 27th Aero Squadron
  - 94th Aero Squadron
  - 95th Aero Squadron
  - 147th Aero Squadron
- U.S. Navy

== Specifications ==
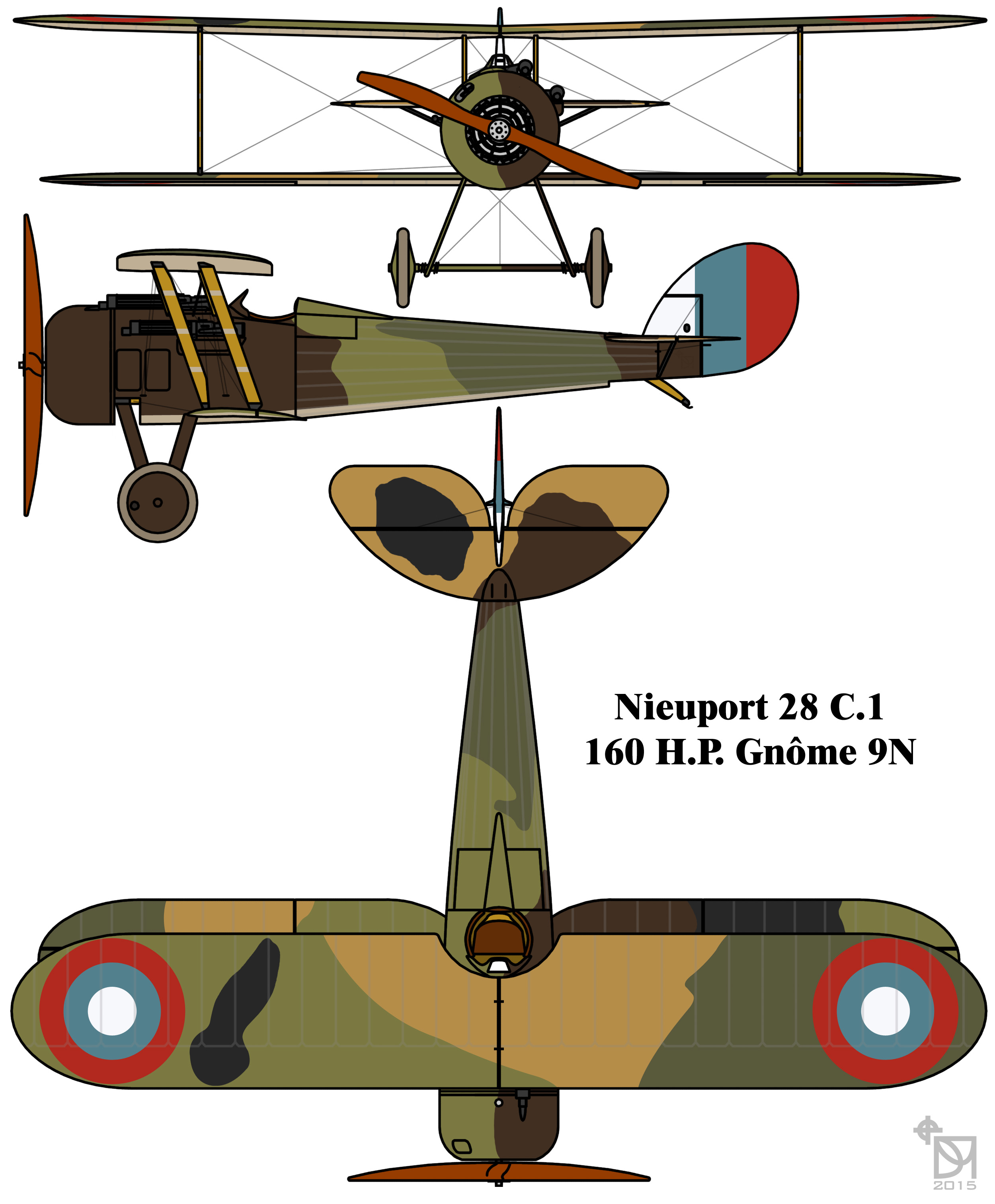
Nieuport 28 C.1 drawing

Data from The Nieuport 28C-I

General characteristics

- Crew: 1
- Length: 6.20 m (20 ft 4 in)
- Wingspan: 8.00 m (26 ft 3 in)
- Height: 2.5 m (8 ft 2 in)
- Wing area: 19.97 m^{2} (215.0 sq ft)
- Empty weight: 532 kg (1,172 lb)
- Gross weight: 737 kg (1,625 lb)
- Fuel capacity: 30 US gal
- Powerplant: 1 × Gnome Monosoupape 9N 9-cylinder air-cooled rotary piston engine, 119 kW (160 hp)
- Propellers: 2-bladed fixed-pitch propeller

Performance

- Maximum speed: 196 km/h (122 mph, 106 kn) at 2,000 m (6,600 ft)
- Endurance: 1 hour 30 minutes
- Service ceiling: 5,200 m (17,000 ft)
- Time to altitude: 3,000 m (9,800 ft) in 11 minutes 30 seconds
- Wing loading: 37 kg/m^{2} (7.6 lb/sq ft)
- Power/mass: 0.16 kW/kg (0.097 hp/lb)

Armament

- Guns: 2 × .303 in Vickers machine guns

== See also ==
- 1917 in aviation

Aircraft of comparable role, configuration, and era

- Albatros D.Va
- Fokker D.VII
- Morane-Saulnier AI
- Siemens-Schuckert D.II
- Sopwith Snipe
- SPAD XIII

Related lists

- List of military aircraft of France
