= The Dawn Patrol (1938 film) =

1938 film by Edmund Goulding

- 1938 US Theatrical Poster
- Directed by: Edmund Goulding
- Written by: John Monk Saunders (story); Seton I. Miller; Dan Totheroh
- Produced by: Jack L. Warner (executive producer); Hal B. Wallis (executive producer); Robert Lord (associate producer)
- Starring: Errol Flynn; Basil Rathbone; David Niven
- Cinematography: Tony Gaudio
- Edited by: Ralph Dawson
- Music by: Max Steiner
- Distributed by: Warner Bros. Pictures
- Release date: December 24, 1938
- Running time: 103 minutes
- Country: United States
- Language: English
- Budget: $500,000
- Box office: $2,185,000

The Dawn Patrol is a 1938 American war film, a remake of the pre-Code 1930 film of the same title. Both were based on the short story "The Flight Commander" by John Monk Saunders, an American writer said to have been haunted by his inability to get into combat as a flyer with the U.S. Air Service.

The film, directed by Edmund Goulding, stars Errol Flynn, Basil Rathbone and David Niven as Royal Flying Corps fighter pilots in World War I. Of the several films that Flynn and Rathbone appeared in together, it is the only one in which their characters are on the same side. Although sparring, as in their other roles, their characters are fast friends and comrades in danger.

The Dawn Patrol's story romanticizes many aspects of the World War I aviation experience that have since become clichés: white scarves, hard-drinking fatalism by doomed pilots, chivalry in the air between combatants, the short life expectancy of new pilots, and the legend of the "Red Baron". However, The Dawn Patrol also contains underlying thematic realism in showing the severe emotional scars suffered by military commanders who must constantly order men to their deaths.

== Plot ==
In 1915, at the airfield in France of 59 Squadron Royal Flying Corps, Major Brand, the squadron leader and his adjutant Phipps anxiously await the return of the dawn patrol. Brand is near his breaking point. He has lost 16 pilots in the previous two weeks, nearly all of them young replacements with little training and no combat experience. Brand is ordered to send up tomorrow what amounts to a suicide mission. Captain Courtney, leader of A Flight, and his good friend "Scotty" Scott return but two of the replacements are not so lucky and another, Hollister, is severely depressed by having witnessed the death of his best friend. The survivors repair to the bar in their mess for drinks and fatalistic revelry. Courtney does his best to console Hollister but the youngster breaks down in grief.

When Brand announces the next day's dawn patrol, Courtney tells Brand he does not have enough men. Brand retorts that more replacements are on the way. From the four green pilots, Courtney picks the two with the most flying hours to go on the mission. Only four return this time; Scott has been lost along with the two new men. Courtney tells a sympathetic Brand that Scott went down saving Hollister. Just then, British troops bring in the German who downed Scott, Hauptmann von Mueller. Courtney overcomes his initial rage when Brand informs von Mueller that it was Courtney who shot him down and the German graciously acknowledges him. Courtney then offers the German a drink. The guilt-ridden Hollister tries to attack the prisoner, but is restrained. Then, a grimy Scotty appears.

B Flight is mauled next. Just after its wounded leader, Captain Squires, informs the squadron that the dreaded von Richter is now their foe, an enemy aircraft flies low over their aerodrome and drops a pair of trench boots. Attached is a taunting note telling the British pilots that they will be safer on the ground. Brand warns his men that the boots are intended to incite inexperienced pilots into trying to retaliate. He forbids any take offs without orders. Courtney and Scott disregard the prohibition, taking off in the dawn mist after stealing the boots from Brand's room. They fly to von Richter's airfield, where the black-painted fighters are being readied for the day. Courtney and Scott bomb and strafe the field, destroying most of the German aircraft and shoot down two which try to take to the air. Courtney then drops the boots. Von Richter retrieves them and shakes his fist at the departing British. Courtney is shot down recrossing the lines, then rescued by Scott, whose aircraft is also hit by anti-aircraft fire. When leaking oil blinds Scott, Courtney talks him down to a crash landing behind their own trenches.

Brand's outrage at their disobedience dissipates when headquarters congratulates him for the success of the attack and promotes him "up to Wing". Brand takes cruel pleasure in naming Courtney to take command of 59 Squadron. Soon, Courtney is forced to acquire all the qualities he hated in Brand. When Scott's younger brother Donnie is posted as a replacement, Scott begs Courtney to give him a few days so that he can teach his brother the ropes. Courtney tells him there can be no exceptions. Unbeknownst to Scott, Courtney calls headquarters to plead for a few days of training for his replacements but is turned down. Von Richter shoots down Donnie in flames the next morning, for which Scott blames Courtney.

Brand gives Courtney orders for a very important mission. An aircraft must fly low and bomb a huge munitions dump 37 mi (60 km) behind the lines. Brand bans Courtney from flying the mission, so Scott disdainfully volunteers. They reconcile and Courtney gets his friend too drunk to fly, then blows up the dump himself. Afterwards, von Richter intercepts Courtney, who outflies and shoots down two of the Germans, including von Richter, but is killed by a third pilot. Command of the squadron devolves to Scott. He lines up the depleted squadron for orders just as five replacements arrive. He stoically tells A Flight to be ready for the dawn patrol.

== Cast ==
- Errol Flynn as Captain / Major "Court" Courtney
- Basil Rathbone as Major / Lieutenant-Colonel Brand
- David Niven as Lieutenant / Captain "Scotty" Scott, also known as "Scott-O"
- Donald Crisp as Lieutenant Phipps, adjutant and artillery observer
- Melville Cooper as Sergeant Watkins
- Barry Fitzgerald as Bott
- Carl Esmond as Hauptmann Von Mueller, captured German flyer
- Peter Willes as Second Lieutenant Hollister
- Morton Lowry as Second Lieutenant Donnie Scott, Captain Scott's younger brother
- Michael Brooke as Squires
- James Burke as Flaherty
- Stuart Hall as Bentham
- Herbert Evans as mechanic
- Sidney Bracey as Major Brand's orderly (credited as Sidney Bracy)
- Leo Nomis as aeronautic supervisor (Note: Leo Nomis was a movie stunt pilot who was killed in February 1932 in an aircraft crash while filming a scene in The Sky Bride. He was "aeronautical supervisor" in the 1930 version of The Dawn Patrol, and since that footage was recycled for the 1938 film, included in the credits for this cast.)
- John Rodion as Lieutenant Russell (Note: "John Rodion" was Basil Rathbone's son, Rodion Rathbone, whose small, uncredited speaking role is spokesman for the first group of doomed replacements he sends out to die.) (uncredited)

== Production ==
The screenplay from the first Dawn Patrol was reprised by original screenwriter Seton Miller, even though its dialogue had been limited because it had been one of the first sound pictures. Miller, in conjunction with director Edmund Goulding, although following the original closely and crediting original co-writer Dan Totheroh, primarily rewrote dialogue to incorporate the characters played by Flynn, Rathbone and Niven.

The proposal for the remake came from producer Hal Wallis to Jack L. Warner in a memo dated April 30, 1938, to financially exploit public awareness of impending war brought on by the German annexation of Austria the month before. Goulding was available to direct after being taken off the filming of Jezebel in favor of William Wyler. Warner had hired Goulding in 1937 on a per-film basis after Louis B. Mayer had fired him from MGM Studios in a sex scandal, and offered him the Dawn Patrol assignment to keep him interested while he completed preparations for filming Dark Victory, which he also wanted Goulding to direct. Although Goulding detested remakes, he had successfully filmed a remake of one of his own films as his first Warner Bros. Pictures project and agreed. (Note: The film remake that Goulding undertook was That Certain Woman.)

The film featured an entirely male cast, and all 12 credited roles of characters in the 59th Squadron were filled by actors with British backgrounds. One of the many British actors cast by Goulding was his house-mate, Michael Brooke (the 7th Earl of Warwick), while Rathbone and Flynn were selected because of their recent appearance together in The Adventures of Robin Hood. Goulding's biographer Matthew Kennedy wrote:

Everyone remembered a set filled with fraternal good cheer ... The filming of Dawn Patrol was an unusual experience for everyone connected with it, and dissipated for all time the legend that Britishers are lacking in a sense of humor ... The picture was made to the accompaniment of more ribbing than Hollywood has ever witnessed. The setting for all this horseplay was the beautiful English manners of the cutterups. The expressions of polite and pained shock on the faces of Niven, Flynn, Rathbone et al., when (women) visitors were embarrassed was the best part of the nonsense.

Principal photography began on August 6, 1938, and ended six weeks later on September 15. Airfield exteriors were shot at the Warner Bros. Ranch near Calabasas, California. (Note: Kennedy states filming began July 18 and ended two months later, indicating that exterior shooting may have begun August 6.)

=== Aircraft ===
A great deal of aerial footage was reused from the earlier 1930 production, where Howard Hawks assembled a variety of aircraft in a film squadron to shoot flying scenes. Hawks used rebuilt Nieuport 28s as the primary aircraft type for the British squadron, and Travel Air 4000s (reconfigured for films and popularly known as "Wichita Fokkers") for German fighters, but other aircraft in his small fleet included Standard J-1s for shots of entire squadrons, some of which were blown up in explosions, and Waterman-Boeing C biplanes for German aircraft destroyed in crashes. The scene in which Scott takes off with Courtney clinging to the wing switches to a shot of a Travel Air 4U Speedwing fitted with a round cowl over its Comet engine to resemble the Nieuports. Stunt pilots included Leo Nomis, Rupert Symes Macalister, Frank Tomick and Roy Wilson.

Director Goulding used much of the footage from the earlier film in the remake to save production costs. For new closeups of aircraft with his own actors, he acquired three Nieuport 28 replicas from Garland Lincoln, a Van Nuys, California, stunt pilot who also recreated World War I aircraft for Hollywood films. Built by Claude Flagg, these "LF-1"s were constructed from Nieuport plans and had many characteristics of the actual aircraft, including upper wing fabric that ripped during dives. In Goulding's production, these aircraft also appear in a few scenes of Nieuports taking off, landing and taxiing. Additional Nieuport 28s were simulated by Thomas-Morse S-4C Scouts, and two were used in the flying scene in which Courtney and Scott attack the German airdrome. 59th Squadron's aircraft were marked in standard RFC camouflage and national insignia, had the marking "NIEU 24" painted on their tail fins, and displayed a cartoon Hornet painted on each side of the fuselage just behind the cockpit. (Note: There is no explanation for the marking, but it possibly indicates that the aircraft were to be identified as Nieuport 24s, which the RFC used.)

For scenes at the German airdrome in which aircraft were moved or had engines turning, Goulding used "Wichita Fokkers" painted black with German markings. His "Pfalzes" had their wings painted in a large and striking red and white checkerboard pattern. Goulding also acquired two genuine Pfalz D.XII fighters for static closeup shots of parked fighters, with at least one repainted white in a later scene to "expand" their numbers. Actual Nieuport 28s and Pfalz D.XIIs were used much later in the war than the 1915 setting of The Dawn Patrol, while the model 28 Nieuport was not used by the RFC at all, but their familiarity of appearance to American audiences gave a verisimilitude to both films.

Some of the aerial footage from both the 1930 and 1938 film was reused (specifically Flynn's doomed solo bombing mission) in the beginning sequences of Warner's British Intelligence, a 1940 World War I spy film starring Boris Karloff.

== Theme ==
The original script developed for Howard Hawks, which Edmund Goulding followed closely, stressed thematic elements that came to be associated with the "Hawksian world" of "pressure cooker" situations: a professional group of men who live by a code and face death with bravado and camaraderie; the responsibility of leadership in perilous situations; a preference for individual initiative over orders; suicidal missions; and the grandeur of aerial flight.

=== Visual motifs ===
The Dawn Patrol uses four scene elements as visual motifs to describe a cyclical nature to war and a nightmarish quality in being in command. Each scene places the viewer in the commander's place, waiting with dread for the inevitable consequences. Nearly all action scenes in The Dawn Patrol cut away before the conclusion is played out to heighten the sense of dread. Each scene's recurrence has differences that accentuate those consequences:

- Counting the sounds of the motors of the returning aircraft to determine how many have died. In the final scenario, when Scott waits to hear Courtney's motor in the dark, his initial joy that Courtney has returned is crushed by what is, in fact, an enemy plane flying overhead to drop his dead comrade's goggles and helmet.
- Receiving orders for the next mission by telephone, with the general's voice barely audible but impatient in tone. The apparent insanity of the orders is emphasized by the callous implacability of the distant, detached headquarters.
- Arrival of replacements in time to enable the next mission but never with time to train them to protect themselves. The poignancy of their eager youthfulness is symbolized by their arrival in an open touring car in a seemingly endless parade.
- Assembling the pilots to issue the orders, with new men ushered into line just after their arrival. Brand, Courtney and Scott, all of whom would rather be flying the mission than ordering it, assume an identical stoicism as they undergo the ordeal.

=== Music ===
The 1930 version of The Dawn Patrol is notable for its lack of background music. The 1938 remake not only added a score by Max Steiner, but uses several songs to set moods. Although not published until 1916 and therefore an anachronism, the melancholy "Poor Butterfly" is played on a gramophone in scenes in which the pilots drink to drown their sorrows. Tellingly, "Poor Butterfly" begins in the background just as Scotty greets the arrival of his younger brother.

The pilots themselves frequently sing "Hurrah for the Next Man That Dies"—and teach it to their German guest—as a grimly sardonic defiance of death. The song was a popular World War I drinking song. The lyrics come from a much older poem written in the early 19th century, recording the bravado of British soldiers struck down by the plague in India. The poem has been attributed to two different authors, Bartholomew Dowling and W.F. Thompson, but Thompson's work appears in a volume of poetry published in Calcutta in 1835., when Dowling was 12 years old. Dowling died in 1863, 51 years before this poem was attributed to him in A Collection of Verse by California Poets (1914).

Each arrival of new replacements is announced by their cheerful singing of "Pack Up Your Troubles in Your Old Kit-Bag", demonstrating their callow eagerness.

In addition, the flyers' carousing nature is emphasized in one scene with music. After Scott's return, he and Courtney drive off in a motorcycle sidecar boisterously singing "Plum and Apple" with their enlisted driver. This was an enlisted men's/other ranks' ditty about the class distinctions of rations at the front.

== Reception ==
With another world war threatening, the pacifistic script of The Dawn Patrol was well received by audiences and critics. The film was one of Warner Bros. most popular movies of 1939. According to Warner Bros. records, it earned $1,313,000 domestically and $872,000 foreign.

Variety echoed many of the critics' reactions: "Dawn Patrol sparkles because of vigorous performances of the entire cast and Edmund Goulding's sharp direction. Story [by John Monk Saunders] is reminiscent of previous yarns about the flying service at the front during the World War. Yet it is different in that it stresses the unreasonableness of the 'brass hats' - the commanders seated miles from the front who dispatched the 59th Squadron to certain death in carrying out combat assignments."

== Home media ==
On March 27, 2007, Warner Bros. released The Dawn Patrol on DVD. Special features include Warner Night at the movies 1938: Vintage Newsreel, musical shorts "The Prisoner of Swing" and "Romance Road". Also included is the vintage Looney Tunes cartoon What Price Porky.
