= The Dawn Patrol (1930 film) =

1930 film

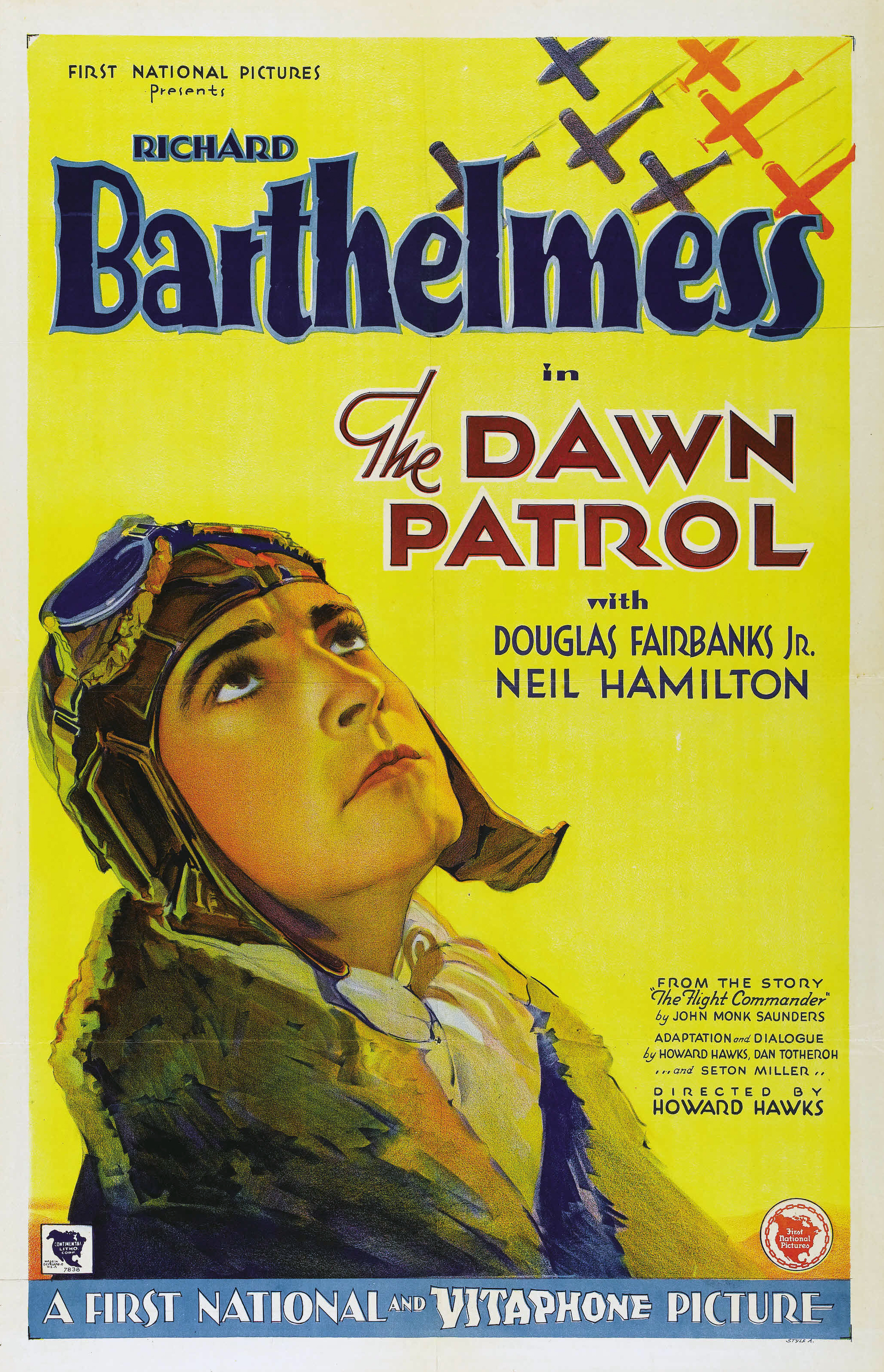
- Theatrical release poster
- Directed by: Howard Hawks
- Written by: Adaptation & dialogue: Dan Totheroh; Howard Hawks; Seton I. Miller; Contributing: Ewart Adamson (uncredited)
- Based on: The Flight Commander by John Monk Saunders
- Produced by: Robert North
- Starring: Richard Barthelmess; Douglas Fairbanks Jr.
- Cinematography: Ernest Haller
- Edited by: Ray Curtiss
- Music by: Rex Dunn (uncredited)
- Production company: First National Pictures
- Distributed by: First National Pictures
- Release dates: July 10, 1930 (NYC); August 20, 1930 (US)
- Running time: 108 minutes
- Country: United States
- Language: English
- Budget: $729,000
- Box office: $1,624,000 (worldwide rentals)

The Dawn Patrol is a 1930 American pre-Code World War I film starring Richard Barthelmess and Douglas Fairbanks Jr. It was directed by Howard Hawks, a former World War I flight instructor, who even flew in the film as a German pilot in an uncredited role. The Dawn Patrol won the Academy Award for Best Story for John Monk Saunders, an American writer said to have been haunted by his inability to get into combat as a flyer with the U.S. Air Service. It was subsequently remade in 1938 with the same title, and the original was then renamed Flight Commander and released later as part of the Warner Bros. film catalog.

== Plot ==
The Dawn Patrol (1930)

During World War I, the pilots of an RFC squadron deal with the stress of combat primarily through nightly bouts of heavy drinking. The two aces of the squadron's "A Flight", Courtney and Scott, have come to hate the commanding officer, Brand, blaming him for sending new recruits directly into combat in inferior aircraft.

Unknown to them, Brand has been arguing continually with higher command to allow practice time for the new pilots, but command is desperate to maintain air superiority and orders them into combat as soon as they arrive. Brand is so disliked by the two he cannot even easily join the men for the nightly partying, drinking alone and clearly breaking under the strain. The tension grows worse when an elite Luftstreitkräfte squadron led by "von Richter" takes up position just across the front lines from them.

After losing several of the squadron's veteran pilots, the ranks become increasingly made up of new recruits who have no chance against the German veterans. Von Richter issues a taunt that Courtney and Scott answer by attacking the Germans' airdrome in defiance of orders from Brand not to go up against them. Brand gets revenge when he is recalled to headquarters and Courtney is made squadron commander. Courtney quickly learns the misery that Brand endured when four patrols a day are ordered and his pleas not to send green men are ignored.

Scott and Courtney have a falling out when Scott's younger brother, one of the new replacements, is immediately ordered on a mission. He is killed flying the dawn patrol. Brand returns with orders for what amounts to a suicide mission far behind enemy lines. Courtney is forbidden to fly the mission, so Scott angrily volunteers. Courtney gets him drunk and flies off in his stead. He shoots down von Richter returning from the successful mission, but is killed by another German pilot. Scott becomes squadron commander and reads orders to his new replacements.

== Cast ==
Left to right: Douglas Fairbanks Jr., Richard Barthelmess and Gardner James

- Richard Barthelmess as Dick Courtney
- Douglas Fairbanks Jr. as Douglas Scott
- Neil Hamilton as Major Brand
- Frank McHugh as Flaherty
- Clyde Cook as Bott
- James Finlayson as Field Sergeant
- Gardner James as Ralph Hollister
- William Janney as Gordon Scott
- Edmund Breon as Lieutenant Phipps

== Production ==
=== Casting ===
Although Ronald Colman was originally to be cast as the lead actor in The Dawn Patrol, Barthelmess was offered by the studio. Paramount Publix Corp. loaned Actor Neil Hamilton and writer Seton I. Miller for the film.

=== Filming ===
Principal photography began in February 1930, with exteriors shot at the Metropolitan Airport in Van Nuys, Newhall, and Sherwood Forrest in Southern California.

In the midst of production, the studio was sued by Howard Hughes, through the Caddo Company and the Gainsborough Corporation. The suit alleged that The Dawn Patrol plagiarized his Hell's Angels (1930) production, also in production. The lawsuit resulted in The Dawn Patrol being rushed through post-production in order to be in theaters before Hughes' competing film. In late 1930, Warner Bros., owners of First National Pictures, won the suit. (Note: The rivalry between Hughes and Zanuck (then of Warner Bros.) was exemplified by Hughes buying up rights to available World War I-era aircraft to keep them out of Zanuck's hands. Hollywood legend has it that the two tycoons settled their differences over a game of golf.) Another contentious issue later arose when both Howard Hawks and John Monk Saunders claimed ownership of the original idea behind the film. Hawks claimed he based the film on his own recollections while Saunders insisted that the screenplay was derived from the interviews of other veterans of World War I. In a deposition, Saunders said it was based on stories from pilots known by himself (during his time as a Rhodes Scholar at Oxford) and by writer Irvin S. Cobb.

=== Aircraft ===
Hawks attempted to create a realistic atmosphere, and assembled a variety of contemporary aircraft in a film squadron to shoot the flying scenes for The Dawn Patrol. He primarily used rebuilt Nieuport 28s as the aircraft for the British squadron, and Travel Air 4000s (reconfigured for films and popularly known as "Wichita Fokkers") for German fighters. Neither was truly representative of the 1915 era that was portrayed. Other aircraft in his small fleet included Standard J-1s for shots of entire squadrons, some of which were blown up in explosions, and Waterman–Boeing C biplanes for German aircraft destroyed in crashes.

The scene in which Scott takes off with Courtney clinging to the wing switches to a shot of a Travel Air 4U Speedwing fitted with a round cowl over its Comet engine to resemble the Nieuports. Stunt pilots included Leo Nomis, Rupert Symes Macalister, Frank Tomick and Roy Wilson. Several Thomas-Morse S-4 aircraft were used in the 1930 film. The S-4 was an American built fighter aircraft that did not see combat in World War I. Plentiful in 1930, the S-4s were becoming rare by the time the 1938 film was produced, hence the re-use of aircraft sequences from the original film. Some in-flight scenes with principal actors were staged with aircraft hoisted up by wires to a height of 25 feet. Stage hands then rocked the aircraft to simulate flight, but when one of the wires snapped, on screen, Barthelmess appeared startled, unaware that an accident had occurred, and simply thought the swaying aircraft was part of the scene.

== Reception ==
=== Box office ===
According to Warner Bros. records, the film earned $1,061,000 domestically and $563,000 internationally, making it the studio's third biggest hit of the year after Gold Diggers of Broadway and Sally.

=== Critical reception ===
Studio brass was extremely reluctant to back the release because Hawks had insisted on realistic dialogue that was at odds with the dramatic tone that executives had demanded. Nonetheless, The Dawn Patrol was an "instant success", one of the studio's most profitable films that year. Later critical reviews noted that the "anti-war" message was more prevalent in the original film, although due to the re-titling of Flight Commander, the film is often not as well known as its 1938 remake. The flying sequences, one of the hallmarks of the film, were vividly shot and were easily integrated into the later remake.

In 2025, The Hollywood Reporter listed The Dawn Patrol as having the best stunts of 1929 to 1930.

=== Awards and honors ===
Despite the controversy over the origin of the screenplay for The Dawn Patrol, in 1931, Saunders won an Academy Award for Best Writing, Screenplay.

The aerial sequences from The Dawn Patrol had a remarkably long lifespan, appearing not only in The Dawn Patrol (1938) but also in British Intelligence (1940).

== Preservation status ==
When the Warner Bros. Classics film catalog was sold, The Dawn Patrol aired on television and from Associated Artists Productions, in its retitled form, as Flight Commander. The original title frames were discarded and the redrawn titles are on all known prints of the film.

== Remake ==
The film was remade in 1938 as a vehicle for Errol Flynn, replacing Barthelmess in the lead, rather than reissuing the original as planned. David Niven took Fairbanks, Jr.'s role and Basil Rathbone was cast in the role played by Neil Hamilton.

Much of the flying sequences from the 1930 film, with several of the close-ups of the fighter aircraft, were re-use for the 1938 movie, so as to save expense without having to search for or build new World War I era aircraft, but also due to the original sequences being expertly shot by Ernest Haller and Elmer Dyer. All of the film of the munitions depot explosions were also edited into the remake with no changes. When the 1938 version was released, the 1930 film was retitled Flight Commander, Saunder's original title for the project, to differentiate it from its 1938 remake.

== In popular culture ==
A novelization of the 1930 film, also titled The Dawn Patrol, was written by Guy Fowler and published by Grosset & Dunlap in 1930. Warner Bros. also released two Looney Tunes cartoons parodying this film. Bosko appeared in Dumb Patrol (1931) and 33 years later, in 1964, Bugs Bunny and Yosemite Sam appeared in a second cartoon spoof that was also called Dumb Patrol.
