= The Rat (1925 film) =

1925 film

- Ivor Novello screenshot
- Directed by: Graham Cutts
- Written by: Graham Cutts (screenplay); Ivor Novello (play); Constance Collier (play)
- Produced by: Michael Balcon
- Starring: Ivor Novello; Mae Marsh; Isabel Jeans
- Cinematography: Hal Young
- Production company: Gainsborough Pictures
- Distributed by: Woolf & Freedman Film Service
- Release date: 1925
- Running time: 74 minutes
- Country: United Kingdom

The Rat is a 1925 British silent film drama, directed by Graham Cutts and starring Ivor Novello, Mae Marsh (imported from Hollywood) and Isabel Jeans. The film is based on the 1924 play of the same title written by Novello and Constance Collier, set in the Parisian criminal underworld. The film's louche settings and melodramatic storyline proved popular with audiences, and its success spawned two sequels, The Triumph of the Rat (1926) and The Return of the Rat (1929).

== Plot ==
Zélie de Chaumet (Jeans) is a bored, sensation-seeking demimondaine, living with her older lover and keeper Herman Stetz (Robert Scholz) in a lavish apartment in a wealthy area of Paris. By contrast career criminal Pierre Boucheron (Novello), known as The Rat, lives with his casual girlfriend Odile (Marsh) in a run-down room in a squalid part of the city.

One evening Zélie has an arrangement to attend a performance at the Folies Bergère with friends. Fearing that this will be a dreary evening out, she asks Herman to arrange an after-theatre party for them at the White Coffin Club, a notorious low-life hangout, to end the evening on an exciting note. Pierre also attends the Folies Bergère that evening on the lookout for easy pickings, and steals Zélie's cigarette case. Meanwhile, Odile has noticed that Pierre has gone out without his knife, and goes to the White Coffin with it. Herman notices her and is struck by her beauty and naïvety. He is in the process of trying to force his attentions on her when Pierre arrives and violently throws him out of the club, warning him never to return.

Zélie and her friends arrive at the White Coffin. Watching Pierre win a knife fight and performing a wild Apache dance with one of the club's showgirls, she is intrigued and strikes up a conversation with him. Pierre recognises her from the Folies Bergère and returns her cigarette case. After she leaves, Pierre receives a note with her address, inviting him to visit. Unknown to Zélie, Herman has had her movements watched and when she arrives home he confronts her about her earlier conduct with Pierre. When she does not deny her fascination with Him, Herman says that he is going out and expects to find her gone by the time he returns.

Pierre arrives at the apartment and although Zélie is delighted to see him, she professes no knowledge of the note which has brought him there. They realise that the note must have been sent by Herman as a ruse to get Pierre out of the way while he pursues Odile. Pierre rushes home, to find Odile in a desperate struggle with Herman to prevent him from forcing himself on her. The enraged Pierre stabs him to death. The screams and struggles are heard by a passing policeman, who summons assistance. Odile persuades Pierre to make his escape through a window, and when the police arrive she claims to have killed Herman herself in self-defence. Pierre returns to the room intending to say he has just returned from visiting Zélie, but when he learns that Odile has confessed to the murder he confesses the truth. However the police do not believe him, thinking he is trying to protect her. Odile asks for some time alone with Pierre, and points out to him that she has a chance of being acquitted by claiming self-defence, whereas he would certainly be sentenced to death for the crime. Reluctantly he agrees, and Odile is taken to prison.

Pierre is refused permission to visit Odile in prison, and becomes increasingly distressed and tormented, taking to wandering the streets in a near-hysterical state. Odile requests a visit from Zélie, which is granted. She begs Zélie to testify that Pierre was with her at the time of the murder. Zélie reluctantly agrees. As Odile's trial is about to begin Pierre spots Zélie and, assuming she has come to gloat, launches a verbal attack on her. He is forcibly removed and returned home by the police. He is beside himself with anguish when Odile returns, having been acquitted of the murder on the self-defence plea. The couple acknowledge how much they mean to each other.

== Cast ==
- Ivor Novello as Pierre Boucheron
- Mae Marsh as Odile Etrange
- Isabel Jeans as Zélie de Chaumet
- Robert Scholz as Herman Stetz
- James Lindsay as Detective Caillard
- Marie Ault as Mère Colline
- Julie Suedo as Mou Mou
- Hugh Brook as Paul
- Esme Fitzgibbons as Madeleine Sornay
- Iris Grey as Rose
