= The Rat (play) =

Play by Ivor Novello and Constance Collier

The Rat is a play by the British writers Ivor Novello and Constance Collier which first premiered in 1924. It ran for 282 performances in its original West End run, initially at the Prince of Wales Theatre before transferring to the Garrick Theatre. Novello himself starred as the title character, an Apache dancer who frequents Paris nightclubs. The cast also included James Lindsay and Isabel Jeans. On Broadway it enjoyed a run of 126 performances at the Colonial Theatre.

The play's success led to a film adaptation The Rat, released the following year by Gainsborough Pictures with Novello again in the title role. This in turn was followed by two sequels The Triumph of the Rat and The Return of the Rat.

== Bibliography ==
- Wearing, J.P. The London Stage 1920-1929: A Calendar of Productions, Performers, and Personnel. Rowman & Littlefield, 2014.
