= Brute Force (1914 film) =

1914 film

- Directed by: D. W. Griffith
- Written by: Eustace Hale Ball; Earl R. Hewitt
- Produced by: D. W. Griffith
- Starring: Robert Harron; Mae Marsh
- Cinematography: G.W. Bitzer
- Distributed by: General Film Company
- Release dates: April 25, 1914 (U.S.); September 22, 1915 (U.S. re-release)
- Running time: 33 minutes
- Country: United States
- Language: Silent (English intertitles)

Brute Force

Brute Force (also known as The Primitive Man) is a 1914 short silent comedy film directed by D. W. Griffith, and starring Robert Harron and Mae Marsh. Described as "a psychological comedy founded on the Darwinian theory of the evolution of man," it depicts cavemen and dinosaurs, and is perhaps the first live-action dinosaur film. It is a sequel to Griffith's earlier film, Man's Genesis (1912).

== Plot ==
At a large, formal party, a young woman named Priscilla greets Harry Faulkner, but then talks with another, larger man and, after a backward glance at Faulkner, leaves with him, much to Faulkner's annoyance.

=== Part one ===
The film then shifts to prehistoric times. A primitive man of the Weakhands tribe emerges from a cave and spots a woman, but is quickly driven off by several men of the Bruteforce tribe.

Lilywhite is forced to leave her cave after the death of her mother. Meanwhile, a Weakhands is chased by a Bruteforce. The former encounters Lilywhite. Weakhands grabs her by the hair and takes her to his cave. She is not unwilling.

Later, while Weakhands is out, a Bruteforce comes upon Lilywhite and captures her. Weakhands comes running, but is tossed aside. He tries to rescue Lilywhite again, but is chased away. While venting his anger and frustration, he invents a weapon when he accidentally thrusts a stick into the hole of a ring-shaped rock. After a fierce battle, he knocks out the Bruteforce with his new club and reclaims his woman. Other Bruteforces arrive, but they leave him alone after he strikes two of them on the arm.

=== Part two ===
Weakhands becomes the leader of the "Stone Club men," who live in the upper caves of a mountain. After losing a war, Monkeywalk, leader of the "low cave men", seeks a new home for his people. They settle on Stone Club land with their only woman.

Meanwhile, Weakhands and his mate's domestic bliss is threatened by the arrival of a dinosaur (a Ceratosaurus with an identifying horn on its nose) at the entrance of their cave. The dinosaur leaves, but the low cave tribe appears. War breaks out. Lilywhite leads the other women in joining the fight, and the intruders are defeated. A low cave man does, however, come away with a club.

While the Stone Club men are away, the low cave men, now armed with clubs themselves, steal their women. Resenting the power wielded by their former lone woman, they strike her down with their clubs. Weakhands leads his men in a rescue attempt, but they are defeated by their stronger enemies and trapped inside their cave. When one Stone Club ventures outside, he is immediately clubbed. "Necessity is the mother of invention," and Weakhands invents the bow and arrow. After he kills two enemies with his new weapon, the low cave men run away. The Stone Clubs follow. Weakhands shoots the man who claimed Lilyhands, then clubs him down.

Returning to the present, Faulkner was reading a book before falling asleep at the party (with the assistance of alcohol). It appears that the prehistoric story was merely his dream, as when he is woken up, he raises the book as if it were a club. The woman has returned, and she shows she is attracted to him.

== Cast ==
- Robert Harron as Harry Faulkner (prologue) / Weakhands (the old days)
- Mae Marsh as Lilywhite
- William J. Butler as Priscilla's father (prologue)
- Wilfred Lucas as Brute Force
- Edwin Curglot as caveman
- Alfred Paget in club (prologue) / as tribesman (the old days)
- Jennie Lee as cavewoman

Rest of cast, listed alphabetically:

- Edwin August
- Lionel Barrymore
- Harry Carey in womanless tribe (the old days)
- John T. Dillon in club (prologue)
- Frank Evans in club (prologue) / as tribesman (the old days)
- Harry Hyde in club (prologue)
- J. Jiquel Lanoe in club (prologue) / as tribesman (the old days)
- Elmo Lincoln in club (prologue) / as tribesman (the old days)
- Charles Hill Mailes as valet (prologue) / tribesman (the old days)
- Joseph McDermott in club (prologue) / as tribesman (the old days)
- W. C. Robinson as valet (prologue) / tribesman (the old days)
- George Siegmann (unconfirmed)
- Blanche Sweet (unconfirmed)
- Kate Toncray as tribeswoman (the old days)

== Home media ==
It is available on the DVD "Robert Harron Rare Shorts".

== See also ==
- List of films featuring dinosaurs
