= The Merry Widow (1934 film) =

1934 film by Ernst Lubitsch

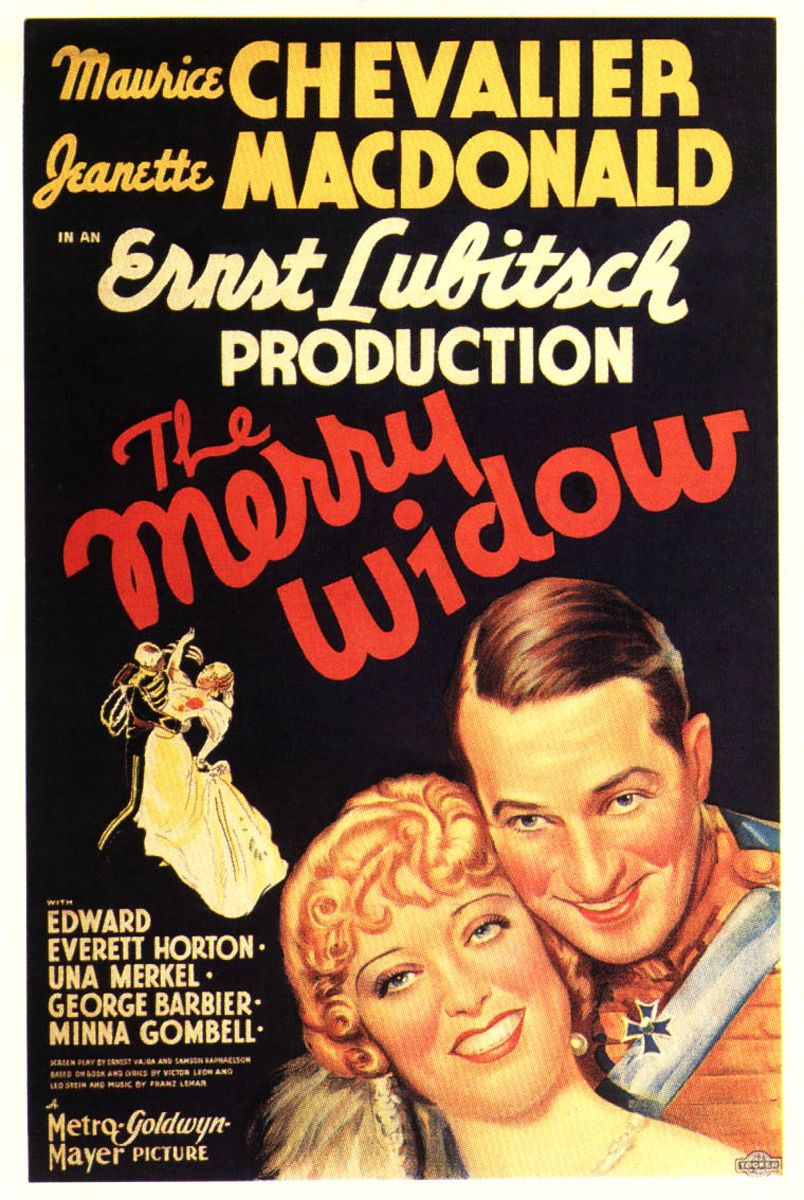
- Theatrical release poster
- Directed by: Ernst Lubitsch
- Screenplay by: Ernest Vajda; Samson Raphaelson
- French adaptation by: Marcel Achard
- Based on: The Merry Widow; 1905 operetta by Franz Lehár Victor Léon (libretto); Leo Stein (libretto)
- Produced by: Irving Thalberg; Ernst Lubitsch
- Starring: Maurice Chevalier; Jeanette MacDonald
- Cinematography: Oliver T. Marsh
- Edited by: Frances Marsh (English); Adrienne Fazan (French)
- Music by: Franz Lehár
- Production company: Metro-Goldwyn-Mayer
- Distributed by: Loew's Inc.
- Release date: October 11, 1934
- Running time: 99 minutes
- Country: United States
- Languages: English; French (separate versions)
- Budget: $1,605,000
- Box office: $2.8 million (worldwide rentals)

The Merry Widow is a 1934 film adaptation of the 1905 operetta of the same name by Franz Lehár. The film was directed and produced by Ernst Lubitsch and stars Maurice Chevalier and Jeanette MacDonald. A French-language version was produced at the same time and released in France the same year as La veuve joyeuse. Lorenz Hart and Gus Kahn wrote new English lyrics for some of Lehar's songs under the musical direction of Herbert Stothart.

== Plot ==
In 1885, in the kingdom of Marshovia, Count Danilo, the captain of the royal guard, spots the widowed Madame Sonia during a military parade. One night, Danilo hands Sonia a self-written letter expressing his romantic affection, but she declines. Per tradition with Marshovian customs, Sonia wears a face veil, and after a year, she decides to move to Paris. Alarmed by the news, King Achmed schemes to have a suitor return Sonia back to the kingdom, as her wealth controls the economy. Achmed proposes potential suitors to his wife, Queen Dolores, but she rejects each of them. Achmed steps out and then returns to Dolores's bedroom, where he catches Danilo flirting with her. Achmed selects Danilo to marry Sonia as punishment for his philandering.

In Paris, Danilo arrives at a cabaret where he is greeted by the can-can dancers. There, Ambassador Popoff relays Danilo the top-secret plan to have him arrive at the next day's embassy ball, where Sonia plans to attend. Later that evening, Danilo meets Sonia, who now calls herself "Fifi", again and romances her, while shooing away competing suitors. He escorts Sonia to a private dining room where they have a brief romantic dalliance. Much to Sonia's annoyance, Danilo states his preference for can-can girls over elegant ladies, and she storms out.

Danilo fails to arrive at the embassy ball. Popoff questions his absence, to which Danilo's orderly Mischka finds him drunk at the cabaret. Danilo tells the dancers of his obligation and leaves for the ball. There, Danilo and Sonia reencounter each other and converse in the garden, where Danilo pleads his sincere love towards her. Meanwhile, Popoff receives a letter from King Achmed, stating Marshovian newspapers will report his scheme. Achmed promptly orders that Danilo marries Sonia tonight. Sonia overhears Popoff announce their engagement, to which she deduces the scheme and leaves. Since Danilo has not married Sonia as mandated, he is arrested and charged with high treason while Sonia withdraws her money from the kingdom.

Sonia arrives at Danilo's trial, where she accuses him of successfully deceiving her. With Achmed's permission, Danilo cross-examines Sonia and testifies in his own guilt. Soon after, Sonia visits Danilo in his jail cell, but Achmed and Popoff lock the two of them alone. Inside the cell, Danilo and Sonia rekindle their romance. When they are presented with engagement rings, the two agree to be married and embrace each other.

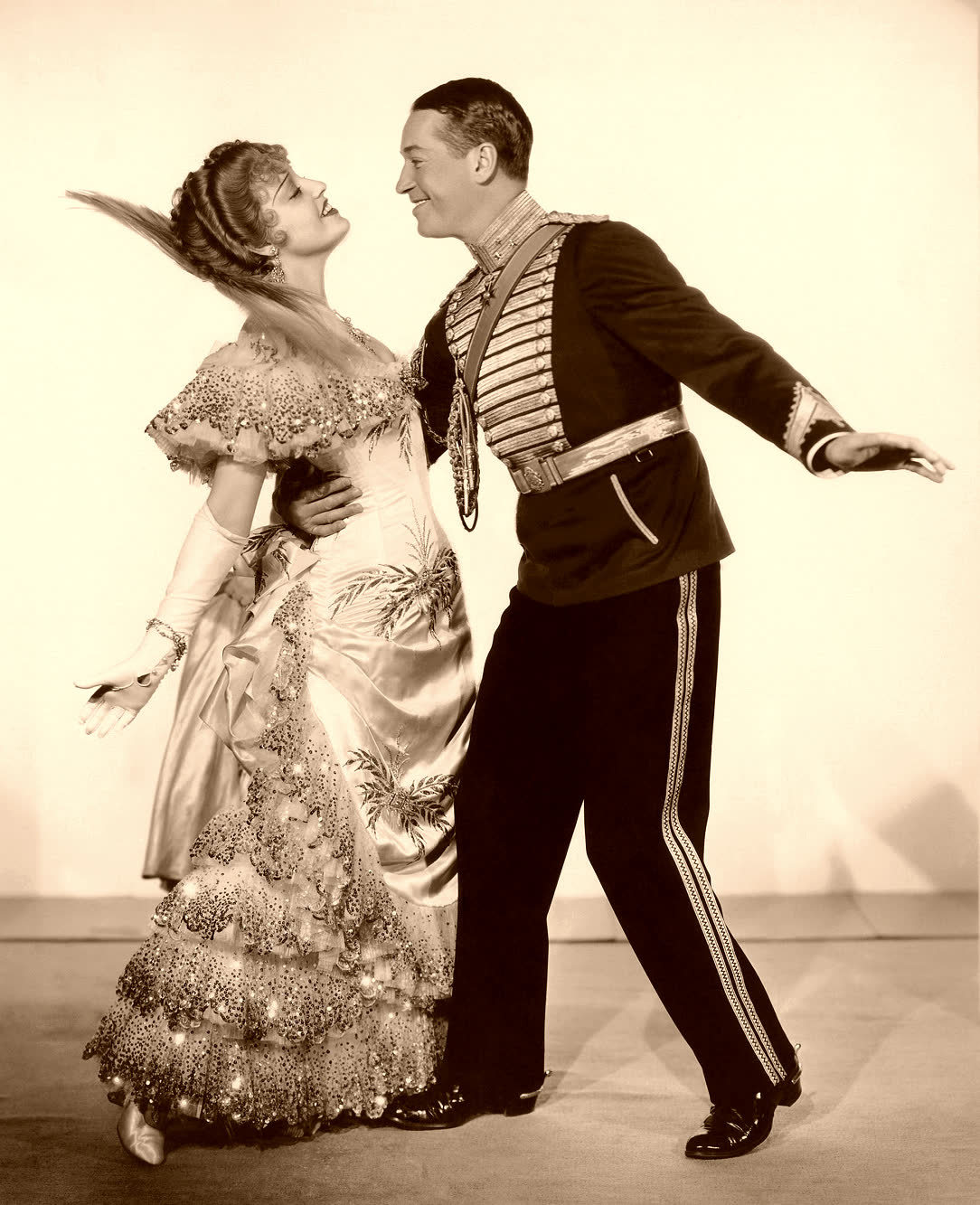
A publicity still of Jeanette MacDonald and Maurice Chevalier in The Merry Widow

== Cast ==
=== English ===
- Maurice Chevalier as Captain Danilo
- Jeanette MacDonald as Madame Sonia / Fifi
- Edward Everett Horton as Ambassador Popoff
- Una Merkel as Queen Dolores
- George Barbier as King Achmed
- Minna Gombell as Marcelle
- Ruth Channing as Lulu
- Sterling Holloway as Mischka
- Donald Meek as Valet
- Herman Bing as Zizipoff
- Jason Robards Sr. as Arresting Officer (uncredited)
- Akim Tamiroff as Maxim's Manager (uncredited)

=== French ===
- Maurice Chevalier as Prince Danilo
- Jeanette MacDonald as Missia
- Marcel Vallée as L'ambassadeur
- Danièle Parola as La reine
- André Berley as Le roi
- Fifi D'Orsay as Marcelle
- Pauline Garon as Lola
- George Davis as L'ordonnance
- Jean Perry as Le valet
- Akim Tamiroff as Turk

== Production ==
Curtis Bernhardt, who directed the 1952 version of The Merry Widow, maintained that because the script for the 1934 film lacked a third act, Lubitsch adapted the jail scene from the third act of the Johann Strauss II comic operetta Die Fledermaus.

== Reception ==
=== Box office ===
The film earned $861,000 in the U.S. and $1,747,000 overseas for a total worldwide rental of $2,608,000. It earned a further $151,000 on a re-release in 1949–1950 to almost recoup its budget.

=== Critical reaction ===
Andre Sennwald of The New York Times wrote:

It is a good show in the excellent Lubitsch manner, heady as the foam on champagne, fragile as mist and as delicately gay as a good-natured censor will permit. ... Although some of the ensemble numbers, particularly the embassy ball, are breathtaking, Herr Lubitsch is not the man to crush you under a mountain of spectacle. His sense of humor is impeccable and his taste is faultless. So with his actors. There was an inconsiderate rumor not long ago that Mr. Chevalier was diminishing in luster. Let that be spiked at once. He has never been better in voice nor charm. Miss MacDonald is similarly fortunate in the twin possessions of a captivating personality and a lyric voice.

Variety acknowledged the changes made to the 1905 operetta, but felt "the result is a grand production, a fine entertainment and undoubtedly a stick of dynamite for the box office."

Time magazine called The Merry Widow "the third and by far the best cinema version of Franz Lehar's famed operetta."

Harrison's Reports felt Chevalier was miscast and "Miss MacDonald does the best she can under the handicap: but even her fine voice and charming personality are unable to overcome these defects. The picture has been produced most lavishly, and has been given a fine directorial touch by Mr. Lubitsch, but it lacks soul."

=== Awards ===
Cedric Gibbons and Fredric Hope won the Academy Award for Best Art Direction.

The film was nominated for the American Film Institute's 2006 list AFI's Greatest Movie Musicals.
