= Home Folks =

1912 film by D. W. Griffith

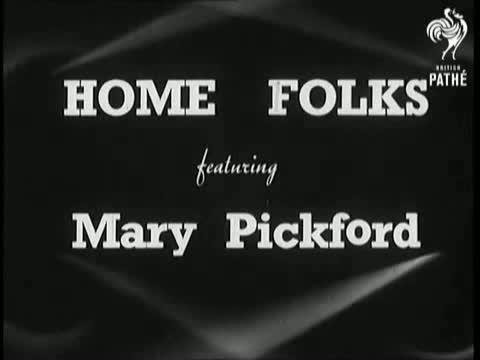
- Directed by: D. W. Griffith
- Written by: Frank E. Woods
- Starring: Mary Pickford; Mae Marsh
- Cinematography: G. W. Bitzer
- Production company: Biograph Company
- Distributed by: General Film Company
- Release date: June 6, 1912
- Running time: 17 minutes
- Country: United States
- Language: Silent (English intertitles)

Home Folks is a 1912 American short silent drama film directed by D. W. Griffith and starring Mary Pickford and Mae Marsh.

== Cast ==
- Mary Pickford as The Young Woman
- Charles Hill Mailes as The Young Woman's Father
- Kate Bruce as The Young Woman's Mother
- Robert Harron as The Young Woman's Brother
- Wilfred Lucas as The Blacksmith
- Charles Avery as At Barn Dance
- Lionel Barrymore
- W. Christy Cabanne as The Blacksmith's Assistant / At Barn Dance
- William A. Carroll as At Barn Dance
- Frank Evans as Outside Dance
- Charles Gorman as A Mover
- Mae Marsh as At Barn Dance
- Frank Opperman as At Barn Dance
- Alfred Paget as Outside Dance
- W. C. Robinson as At Barn Dance
- Kate Toncray as At Barn Dance
- Henry B. Walthall
- Charles West as At Barn Dance

== See also ==
- List of American films of 1912
- D. W. Griffith filmography
- Mary Pickford filmography
