= The Cave Boy of the Age of Stone =

1907 novel by Margaret A. McIntyre

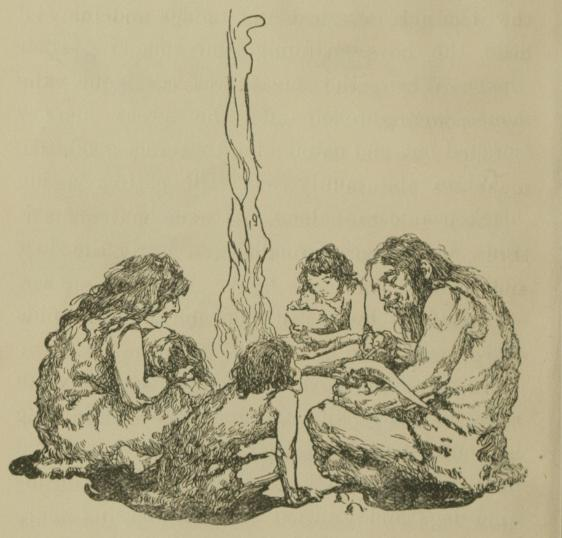
- The boys family sitting around their fire with the baby and parents. (cover not available)
- Author: Margaret A. McIntyre
- Language: English
- Series: editions list
- Genre: Juvenile novel
- Publisher: George G. Harrap & Co. Ltd. (UK); D. Appleton and Company (US)
- Publication date: 1907
- Publication place: United States

The Cave Boy of the Age of Stone is a classic heavily illustrated educational children's novel aimed at a juvenile audience published in 1907 by author Margaret A. McIntyre and illustrated by Irma Deremeaux which is currently available in digital formats from multiple sources. By 2007, the work had entered the public domain and several reprint publishers on three continents have brought out new editions varying considerably in quality and workmanship, including at least one with the many original line drawings (Etchings) reproduced throughout (See list below) in a high quality hardcover edition.

== Synopsis ==
The story line focuses on two young brothers and their family group while attempting to educate the young reader in a picture of what life was likely like for Cavemen. In the earliest part of the narrative, the author introduces the idea of domestication of animals, because a tethered kid (goat offspring) had become gentled and docile—so much so they put their toddler sister on its back for a ride. Moving forward, the novel describes all the major milestones featured during the stone age such as the discovery of fire, the creation of weapons, hunting/ foraging for food, cooking that food, as well as how and why man learnt how to swim.

== Chapters list ==
CHAPTER	Chapter Titles
I.	Strongarm's Family
II.	The Needle, the Club, and the Bow
III.	The Taming of the Dog
IV.	How Strongarm Hunted a Bear and a Lion
V.	The Old Ax Maker Visits His Daughter
VI.	The Coming of Fire
VII.	The Cave Tiger
VIII.	The Making of Stone Weapons
IX.	At the Gravel Pit
X.	A Summer Camp
XI.	Thorn Meets the Children of the Shell Mounds
XII.	At the Home of the Shell Mound People
XIII.	Thorn Learns to Swim
XIV.	The Feast of Mammoth's Meat
PART II (non-fiction)	Educational materials organized for teachers giving a variety of archaeological and geographical information as was accepted in 1907.
XV.	The Red Men of Our Own Country in the Stone Age
XVI.	How Stone Weapons of the Cave Men Were First Found
XVII.	How the Earth Looked When the Shell Men and the Cave Men Lived
XVIIII.	How Early Men Believed That All Things That Move Are Alive
XIX.	The People of Our Time Who Were Most Like the Cave Men
	SUGGESTIONS TO TEACHERS

== Illustrations ==
As is characteristic of many quality works by the publishers of the first US and UK editions, the work is heavily illustrated with engravings, some of which are illustrated below.

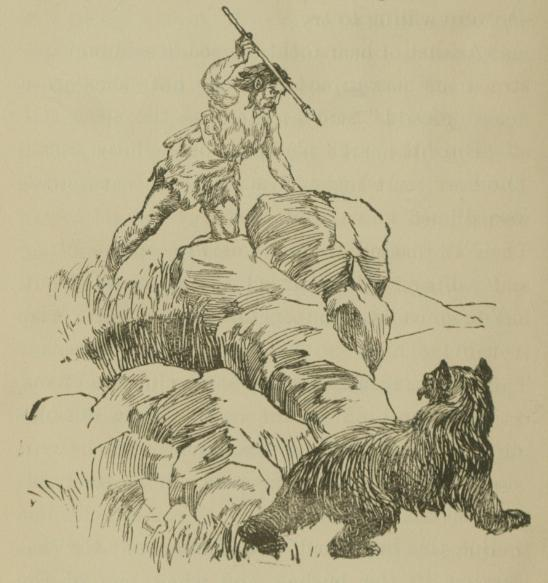

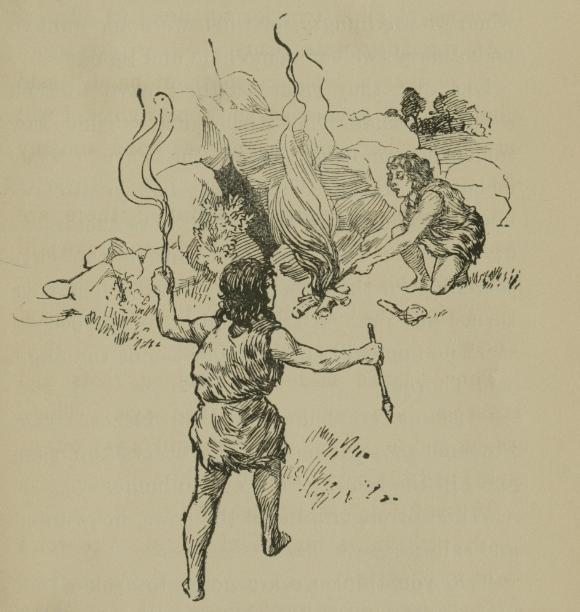

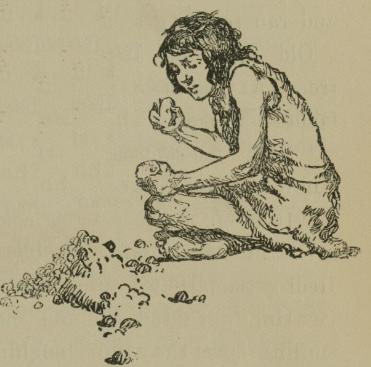

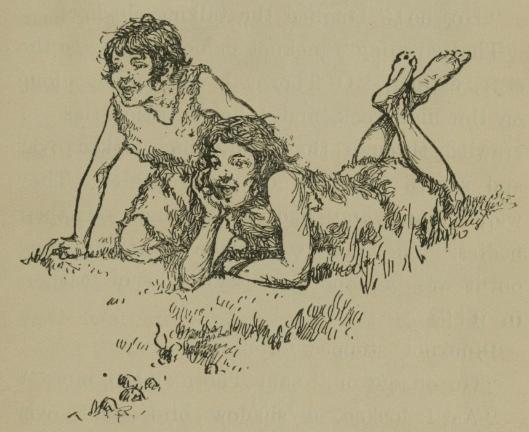

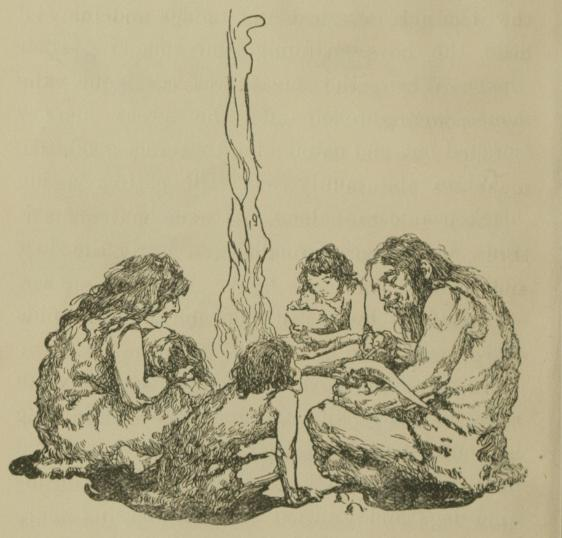

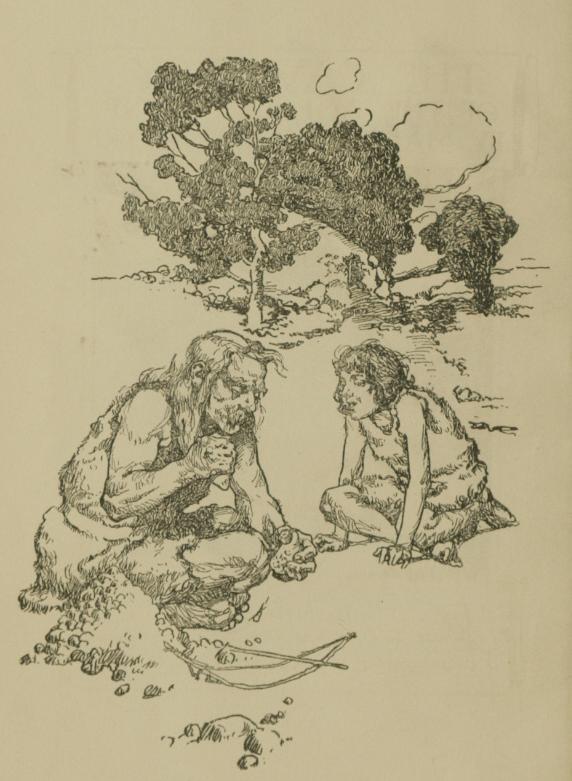

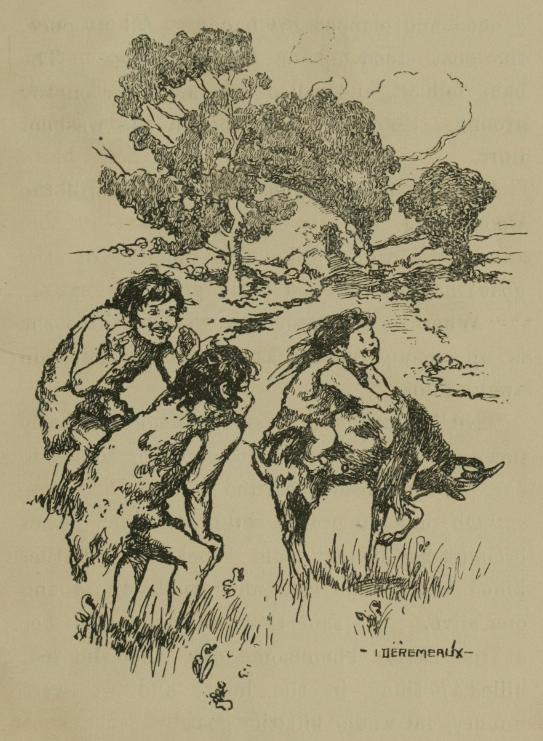

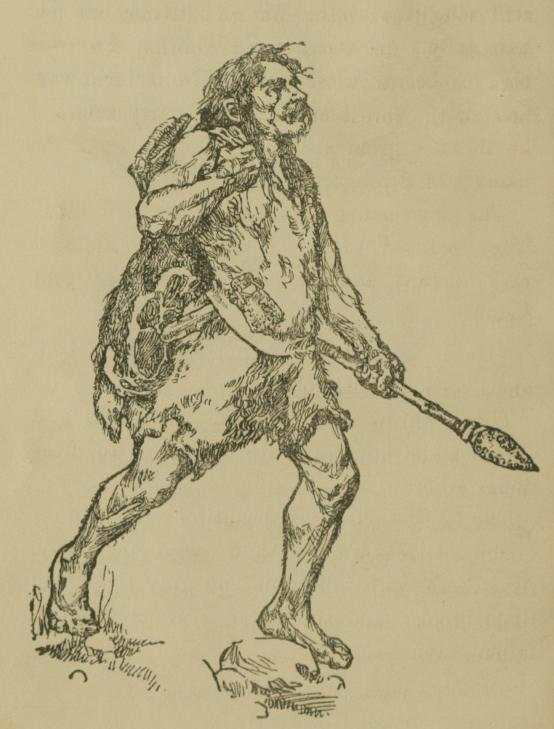
