= The White Rose (1923 film) =

1923 film directed by D. W. Griffith

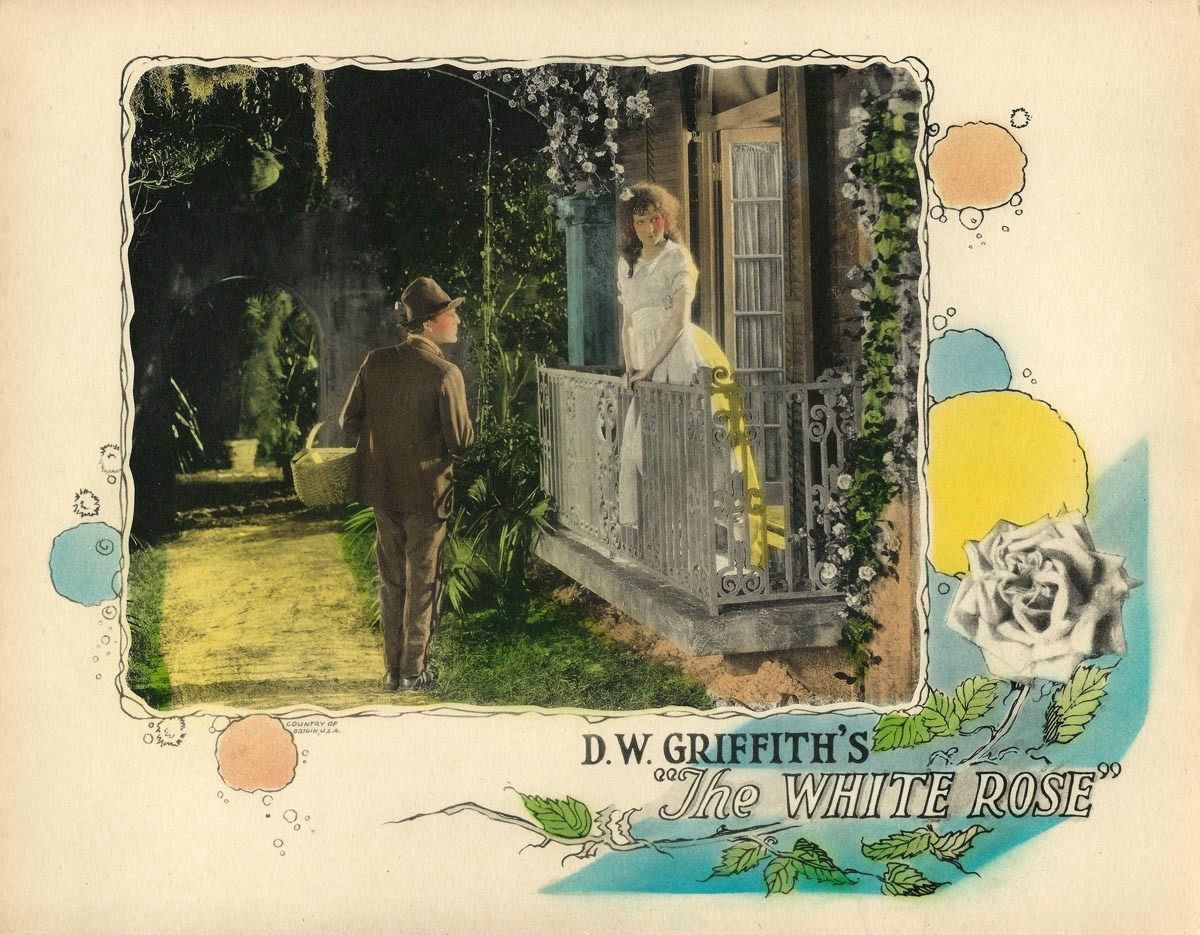
- Lobby card
- Directed by: D. W. Griffith; Herbert Sutch (asst. director)
- Written by: Irene Sinclair (pen name of Griffith)
- Produced by: D. W. Griffith
- Starring: Mae Marsh; Ivor Novello; Carol Dempster; Neil Hamilton
- Cinematography: Billy Bitzer; Hendrik Sartov; Harold Sintzenich
- Music by: Joseph Breil
- Distributed by: United Artists
- Release date: May 21, 1923
- Running time: 100 minutes
- Country: United States
- Language: Silent (English intertitles)
- Budget: $425,000
- Box office: $900,000

The full film

The White Rose is a 1923 American silent drama film directed by D. W. Griffith. The film was written, produced, and directed by Griffith, and stars Mae Marsh, Ivor Novello, Carol Dempster, and Neil Hamilton. Though this film is extant, it is one of Griffith's rarely seen films.

== Plot ==
A wealthy young Southern aristocrat, Joseph, graduates from a seminary and, before he takes charge of his assigned parish, decides to go out and see what "the real world" is all about. He winds up in New Orleans and finds himself attracted to a poor, unsophisticated orphan girl, Bessie, that he meets at a dance hall. One thing leads to another, and before long Bessie finds that she is pregnant with Joseph's child.

== Cast ==
- Mae Marsh as Bessie 'Teazie' Williams
- Carol Dempster as Marie Carrington
- Ivor Novello as Joseph Beaugarde
- Neil Hamilton as John White
- Lucille La Verne as 'Auntie' Easter (as Lucille Laverne)
- Porter Strong as Apollo
- Jane Thomas as cigar stand girl
- Kate Bruce as an aunt
- Erville Alderson as man of the world
- Herbert Sutch as the bishop
- Joseph Burke as the landlord
- Mary Foy as the landlady
- Charles Emmett Mack as guest
- Uncle Tom Jenkins as old black man (uncredited)

== Production ==
The film was shot in several locations throughout Florida and Louisiana; including in New Iberia and St. Martinville, Louisiana.

Lucille La Verne and Porter Strong played household servant roles in blackface.

== Reception ==
The film was not well received. It was viewed as another typical story of the young innocent girl robbed of her purity told at a very slow pace.

== Retrospective appraisal ==
Biographer and film critic Edward Wagenknecht characterizes The White Rose as "a kind of elaboration of the unwed mother portion of Way Down East (1920), though with a less innocent heroine." Praising the landscape shots that create the atmosphere of the Southern town and countryside, Wagenknecht registered this objection: "Symbolism was used too freely—as when the rose droops to indicate the passing of a night of love which Mae Marsh and Ivor Novello spend by the river and the changes it has wrought."

== Preservation status ==
Prints of The White Rose are listed as being located at the George Eastman House Motion Picture Collection, UCLA Film & Television Archive, Academy Film Archive, and several other film archives.
