= Graham Cutts =

British film director (1884–1958)

- Born: John Henry Graham Cutts; 1884; Brighton, Sussex, England
- Died: 7 February 1958 (aged 73–74); London, England
- Other name: Jack
- Occupation: Film director
- Years active: 1922–1940

John Henry Graham Cutts (1884 (Note: Some sources give the birth year as 1885. The British Film Institute gives 1884. The UK General Register Office shows a John Henry G. Cutts born in Brighton in 1884 Q1.) – 7 February 1958), known as Graham Cutts, was a British film director, one of the leading British directors in the 1920s. His fellow director A. V. Bramble believed that Gainsborough Pictures had been built on the back of his work. Cutts worked with many leading figures in the UK film and stage world, including Basil Dean, Alfred Hitchcock, Gracie Fields, Ivor Novello, and Noël Coward.

He started his career as a northern exhibitor and moved into direction. When opportunities were limited in Britain, he filmed extensively in Europe.

Ernest Betts describes him as "[seeming] likely to become a major talent in British films with Woman to Woman which he directed in 1922. Cutts had a polish, a know-how, an intimacy with worldly affairs which impressed the ordinary filmgoer … The Rat, The Wonderful Lie and The Blackguard which Cutts made in the 1920s showed a director who had learned much from the continental school and could match Hollywood in technical virtuosity." Anthony Slide observes that "Both Graham Cutts and Herbert Wilcox deserve recognition as prominent British filmmakers who realized the necessity to bring over American actors (or more precisely former stars) to appear in their productions and thus assure them an American market."

Cutts directed the sensational Cocaine (1922), the most controversial film of the 1920s.

Reviewing Paddy the Next Best Thing (1923), Variety concluded "This is one of the best British films yet made", and the Kinematograph Weekly lauded Cutts' "smooth" direction and his skill in the humorous sections.

His daughter was actress Patricia Cutts (1926–1974).

== Selected filmography ==
- The Wonderful Story (1922)
- Cocaine (1922)
- Flames of Passion (1922)
- Woman to Woman (1923) with Alfred Hitchcock as assistant
- The White Shadow (1923) with Hitchcock as assistant
- Paddy the Next Best Thing (1923)
- The Prude's Fall (1924) aka Dangerous Virtue with Hitchcock as assistant
- The Passionate Adventure (1924) with Hitchcock as assistant
- The Rat (1925) based on Ivor Novello play
- Die Prinzessin und der Geiger (UK/Germany, 1925) UK title The Blackguard with Hitchcock as assistant
- The Triumph of the Rat (1926)
- The Sea Urchin (1926)
- Chance the Idol (1927)
- The Rolling Road (1927)
- The Queen Was in the Parlour (1927) based on the Noël Coward play
- God's Clay (1928)
- Glorious Youth (1929)
- The Return of the Rat (1929)
- The Sign of Four: Sherlock Holmes' Greatest Case (1932)
- Looking on the Bright Side (1932)
- The Temperance Fête (1932)
- Three Men in a Boat (1933)
- Oh, Daddy! (1935)
- Car of Dreams (1935)
- Aren't Men Beasts! (1937)
- Over She Goes (1938)
- She Couldn't Say No (1939)
- Just William (1940)
