= Sins of the Fathers (1928 film) =

1928 film

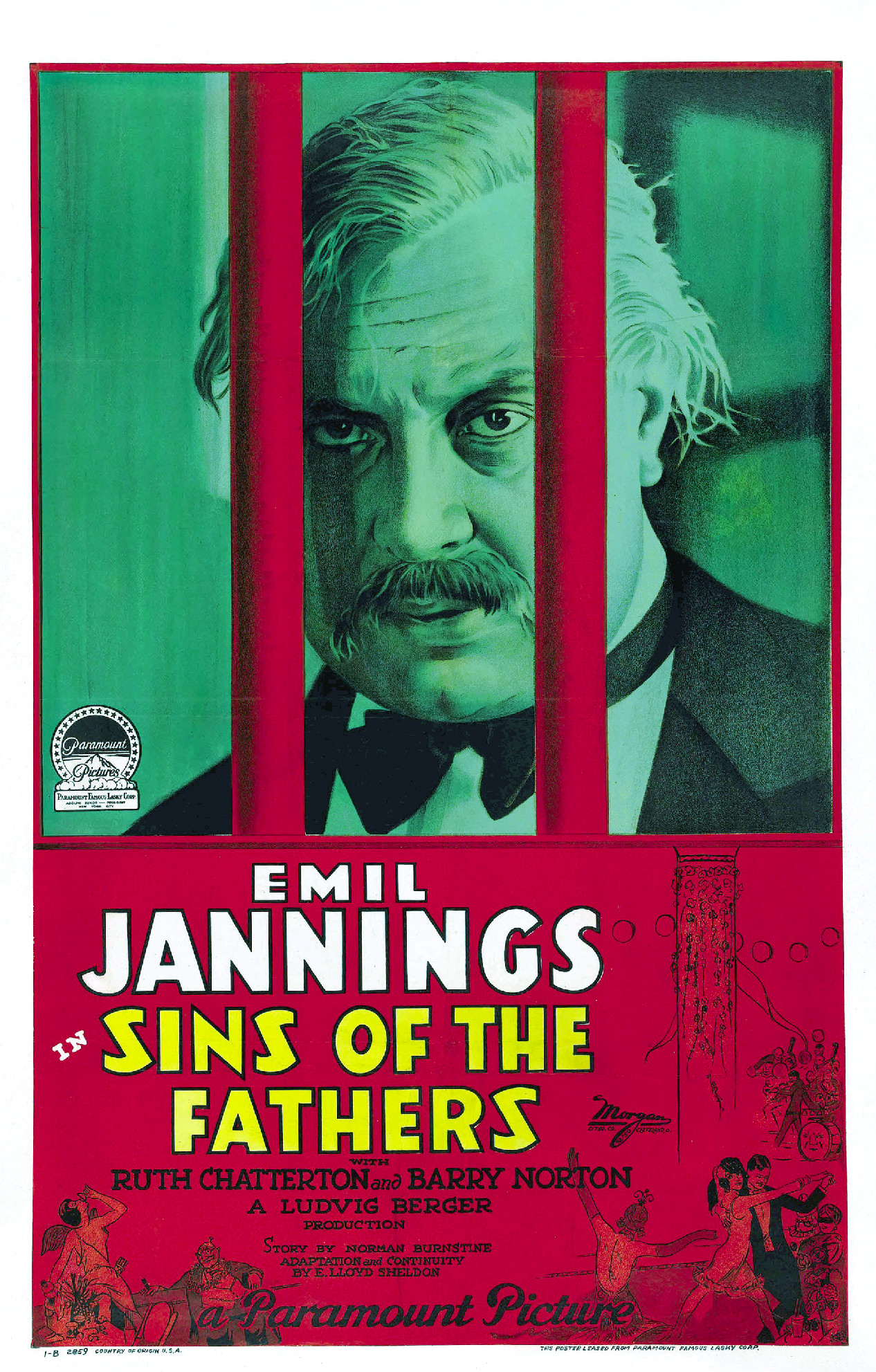
- Lobby poster
- Directed by: Ludwig Berger
- Screenplay by: E. Lloyd Sheldon; Julian Johnson
- Story by: Norman Burnstine
- Produced by: Famous Players–Lasky
- Starring: Emil Jannings; Ruth Chatterton; ZaSu Pitts
- Cinematography: Victor Milner; Slavko Vorkapic (montage sequence)
- Edited by: Frances Marsh
- Music by: Hugo Riesenfeld
- Distributed by: Paramount Pictures
- Release date: December 29, 1928
- Running time: 10 reels; 2320 meters; 7,611 feet
- Country: United States
- Languages: Sound film (Part-Talkie) (English intertitles)

Sins of the Fathers is a 1928 American sound part-talkie drama film produced by Famous Players–Lasky and released by Paramount Pictures. Like the majority of films during the early sound era, it was also issued in a silent version for theaters which were not yet wired for sound. The film was directed by Ludwig Berger and stars Emil Jannings and Ruth Chatterton in her motion picture debut.

== Plot ==
Wilhelm Spengler, a respected German-American restaurant owner, lives a modest life with his wife, his daughter Mary, and his young son Tom. Spengler’s world begins to unravel when he becomes entangled with Gretta Blake, a seductive and ambitious young woman who frequents his café.

Spengler’s infatuation with Gretta causes deep strife at home. His overworked wife collapses and dies after witnessing Spengler kiss Gretta. At her deathbed, he appears repentant, but Gretta quickly lures him back. He marries her, introducing her into the household over the protests of Mary and her sweetheart Otto Schmidt, a humble café waiter. When they quarrel with Gretta, the young couple is cast out of the house.

Under Gretta’s influence, Spengler’s once-wholesome establishment transforms. Wild liquor parties alienate his old German friends, and with the arrival of Prohibition, the café closes. Gretta, ever manipulative, urges Spengler to capitalize on the changing times. Appealing to his ambition for their son’s future, she persuades him to enter the bootlegging trade. She brings in her lover, Gus Newman, to be Spengler’s partner.

Spengler becomes a bootlegging kingpin and amasses great wealth. Their son Tom is sent to elite schools, and the family lives lavishly in a grand home. Meanwhile, Gretta continues her string of affairs, even with the household butler. On the night Tom returns from college, Spengler plans a grand family dinner—but ends up eating alone. Gretta has run off with a worthless playboy Count, and Tom, now a grown man, celebrates his homecoming by getting drunk at a nightclub—ironically, on his father's own liquor.

That same night, a bitter Hijacker, harboring a grudge against Spengler, tips off the authorities about his massive illegal still. Gus tries to call with a warning, but just then Tom stumbles home and suddenly collapses—stricken with sudden blindness.

Spengler, devastated by his son’s condition, is too distracted to act. Gretta and Gus seize the opportunity and flee with all the money they can find, abandoning Spengler in his hour of need. The empire collapses. Spengler is arrested, his fortune gone, his son blind, and his reputation ruined.

Years pass. Spengler, now a broken old man, is released early from prison for good behavior. He finds humble work as a waiter at a picnic garden. One day, he is stunned to serve a celebrated customer—his own son Tom, who has become a famous novelist despite his blindness. They recognize each other. Soon after, Mary and Otto arrive. A tearful reunion follows, and Tom brings about a reconciliation. Though impoverished, Spengler is finally restored to his family, closing the chapter of his long, tragic fall—and offering a final hope of redemption.

== Cast ==
- Emil Jannings as Wilhelm Spengler
- Ruth Chatterton as Gretta Blake
- Barry Norton as Tom Spengler
- Jean Arthur as Mary Spengler
- Jack Luden as Otto Schmidt
- ZaSu Pitts as Mother Spengler
- Matthew Betz as Gus Newman
- Harry Cording as The Hijacker
- Arthur Housman as The Count
- Frank Reicher as The Eye Specialist
- Douglas Haig as Tom, as a child
- Dawn O'Day (later known as Anne Shirley) as Mary, as a child
- Milla Davenport in a bit part (uncredited)
- Speed Webb and His Orchestra (uncredited)

== Music ==
The film featured a theme song entitled "Little Fellow" which was composed by Pat Heale, David Paget and Walter Collins

== Survival status ==
It has been reported that a print of Sins of the Fathers survives. Some promotional or Coming Attraction material is held by the Library of Congress and excerpts are preserved at the UCLA Film & Television Archive.

== See also ==
- List of early sound feature films (1926–1929)
