= The Woman from Moscow =

1928 film by Ludwig Berger

- Film poster
- Directed by: Ludwig Berger
- Screenplay by: John Farrow
- Based on: play Fédora by Victorien Sardou
- Starring: Pola Negri; Norman Kerry; Lawrence Grant
- Edited by: Frances Marsh; E. Lloyd Sheldon
- Music by: Karl Hajos (sound track, music and effects)
- Production company: Paramount Pictures
- Release date: November 3, 1928
- Running time: 77 mins
- Country: United States
- Languages: Sound (Synchronized); English Intertitles)

The Woman from Moscow is a 1928 American synchronized sound drama film starring Pola Negri. This was Negri's last film without synchronized speech. While the film has no audible dialog, it was released with a synchronized musical score with sound effects using the sound-on-film Western Electric Sound System process.

The picture is a remake of Paramount's 1918 Pauline Frederick film Fedora, based on the play by Victorien Sardou.

== Plot ==
Princess Fedora (Pola Negri) arrives at the castle of General Stroganoff (Lawrence Grant), where she is to be reunited with her childhood fiancé, Vladimir Stroganoff (Paul Lukas), the general's son. A ball is held in her honor, but Vladimir is mysteriously summoned away during the festivities. He is later found shot to death in a deserted house. Grief-stricken and enraged, Fedora and the general vow vengeance, convinced that Nihilists are responsible for the murder.

Suspicion falls upon Loris Ipanoff (Norman Kerry), a former officer believed to be aligned with the Nihilist cause. He hastily flees Russia for Paris, and Fedora follows him there, determined to uncover proof of his guilt and avenge Vladimir's death.

In Paris, Fedora encounters a charming stranger at a society event. They fall in love—only for her to discover that the man is none other than Loris Ipanoff. As she gets to know him, her certainty about his guilt begins to waver. He is kind, thoughtful, and sincere, and Fedora finds herself unable to resist her feelings. She conceals her true identity and agrees to return to Russia with him. But just before they depart, Loris reveals that he cannot go back—because he has killed a man.

Tormented, Fedora drafts a telegram to the general exposing Loris’ identity, but she cannot bring herself to send it. The general's aide, Gretch Milner (Otto Matieson), who has been helping Fedora, discovers the unsent telegram and, acting on his own, sends it. He also plots Loris's assassination.

That night, Loris fully confesses the truth to Fedora: Vladimir had dishonored his sister (Mirra Rayo), and refused to face him in a duel. Instead, Vladimir attempted to shoot Loris in the back, and Loris killed him in self-defense. Fedora, shattered by the revelation, realizes the terrible mistake she has made.

To protect Loris, Fedora keeps him at her side through the night, preventing the planned assassination. But the telegram has already reached General Stroganoff, who orders the arrest and exile of the entire Ipanoff family to Siberia. Loris’ brother (Jack Luden) is killed resisting arrest. His mother (Martha Franklin) and sister are taken away.

When Loris learns of his family's fate, he believes Fedora betrayed him. Despite her desperate pleas and explanations, he rejects her. Knowing their love can never be mended under the weight of such sorrow and loss, Fedora takes poison.

Too late, Loris realizes the depth of Fedora's love and the price she paid. He returns to her side, only to cradle her in his arms as she dies.

== Cast ==
- Pola Negri as Princess Fedora
- Norman Kerry as Loris Ipanoff
- Lawrence Grant as The General Stroganoff
- Paul Lukas as Vladimir, his son
- Otto Matieson as Gretch Milner
- Maude George as Olga Andreavitshka
- Bodil Rosing as Nadia
- Jack Luden as Ipanoff's Brother
- Martha Franklin as Ipanoff's Mother
- Mirra Rayo as Ipanoff's Sister
- Tetsu Komai as Groom

== Music ==
The film featured a theme song entitled "Mine Alone" which was composed by Karl Hajos.

== Preservation status ==
- Reels 4, 6, and 7 exist at Lobster Films. though Status unclear following 2020 apartment fire incident with prints from lobster films

== See also ==
- List of early sound feature films (1926–1929)
