= Frances Marsh =

American film editor

- Born: May 28, 1897; Texas, U.S.
- Died: March 3, 1958 (aged 60); California, U.S.
- Occupation: Film editor
- Relatives: Mae Marsh (sister); Marguerite Marsh (sister); Oliver T. Marsh (brother); Warne Marsh (nephew)

Frances Marsh was an American film editor active during the 1920s and 1930s. She worked on many of Ernst Lubitsch's films and was considered one of the foremost editors of her day.

== Biography ==
Frances was born in Texas to Stephen Marsh and Mae Warne. She came from a big family, and many of her siblings became involved with the film industry after they all moved to Los Angeles. Brother Oliver became a cinematographer, and sisters Mildred, Mae, Leslie, and Marguerite became actresses.

Frances started out as a script clerk around 1925 before making a name for herself as a film editor. She was employed as a film editor at Paramount-Famous Players by 1928; and she edited four films that year: A Night of Mystery, The Magnificent Flirt, The Woman from Moscow, and Sins of the Father. Her last known credit was on 1934's The Merry Widow.

"I have often cried right there in the cutting room while editing a particularly romantic or sentimental scene," Marsh later told a reporter. "I know that sounds sort of stupid, but after all, I'm just a fan who happens to know a little more of the technical end of pictures than the average fan."

== Selected filmography ==
- The Merry Widow (1934)
- Design for Living (1933)
- Darkened Rooms (1929)
- Stairs of Sand (1929)
- Sins of the Fathers (1928)
- The Woman from Moscow (1928)
- The Magnificent Flirt (1928)
- A Night of Mystery (1928)
