= Caveman =

Character stereotype used to represent primitive men

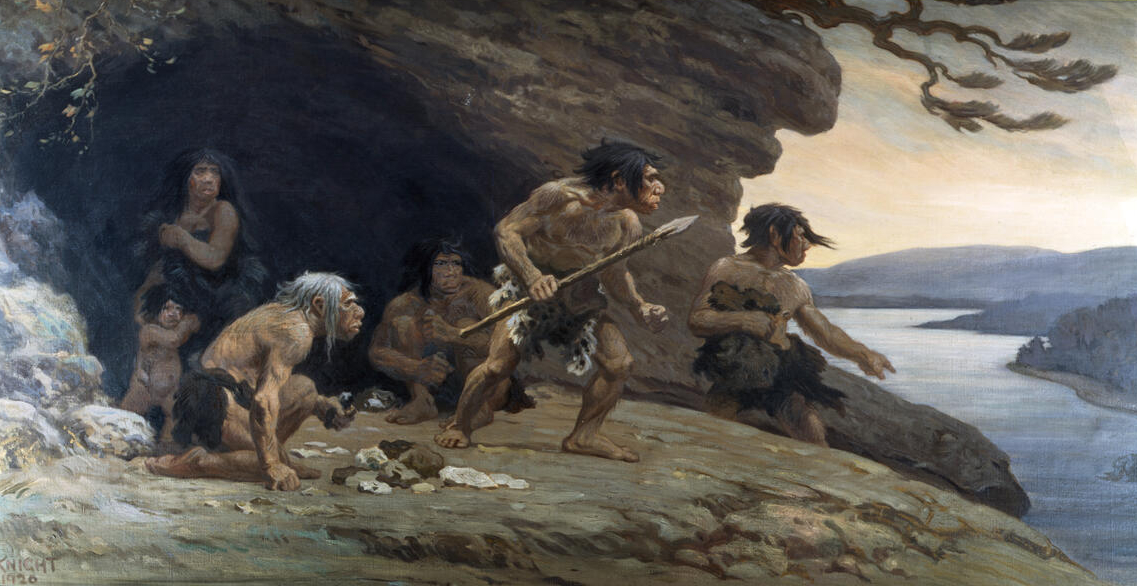
Neanderthal Flintworkers, Le Moustier Cavern, Dordogne, France (Charles R. Knight, 1920)

The caveman is a stock character representative of primitive humans in the Paleolithic. The popularization of the type dates to the early 20th century, when Neanderthals were influentially described as "simian" or "ape-like" by Marcellin Boule and Arthur Keith.

The term "caveman" has its taxonomic equivalent in the now-obsolete binomial classification of Homo troglodytes (Linnaeus, 1758).

== Characteristics ==
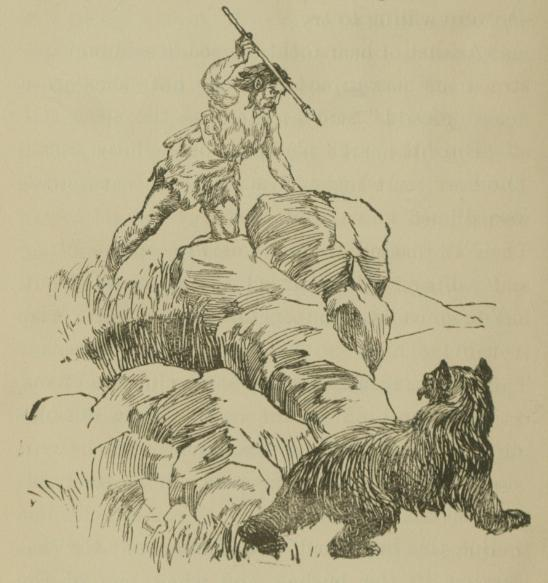
Caveman hunting a brown bear. Book illustration by unknown artist for The Cave Boy of the Age of Stone (1907).

Cavemen are typically portrayed as wearing shaggy animal hides, armed with rocks, cattle bone clubs, spears, or sticks with rocks tied to them, and are portrayed as unintelligent and with either an easily frightened or aggressive personality. Typically, they have a low-pitched rough voice and make gibberish vocalizations and grunts or speak using simple phrases. Popular culture also frequently represents cavemen as living with, or alongside, dinosaurs, even though non-avian dinosaurs became extinct at the end of the Cretaceous period, 66 million years before the emergence of Homo sapiens.

Stereotypical cavemen have traditionally been depicted wearing smock-like garments made from the skins of animals and held up by a shoulder strap on one side, or loincloths made from leopard or tiger skins. Stereotypical cavewomen are similarly depicted, but sometimes with slimmer proportions and bones tied up in their hair. They are also depicted carrying large clubs. They often have grunt-like names, such as "Ugg" and "Zog".

The 2017 book Inventing the Cave Man: From Darwin to the Flintstones by Andrew Horrall traces the evolution of the image of a caveman in public perception, up to the modern pop-culture image: "bare-footed, wild-haired and bearded, with rough animal-hide clothes half-covering his body and a stout wooden club in his hand", arguing that its roots lie in the mid-19th century "gorilla cartoons".

== History of depictions ==
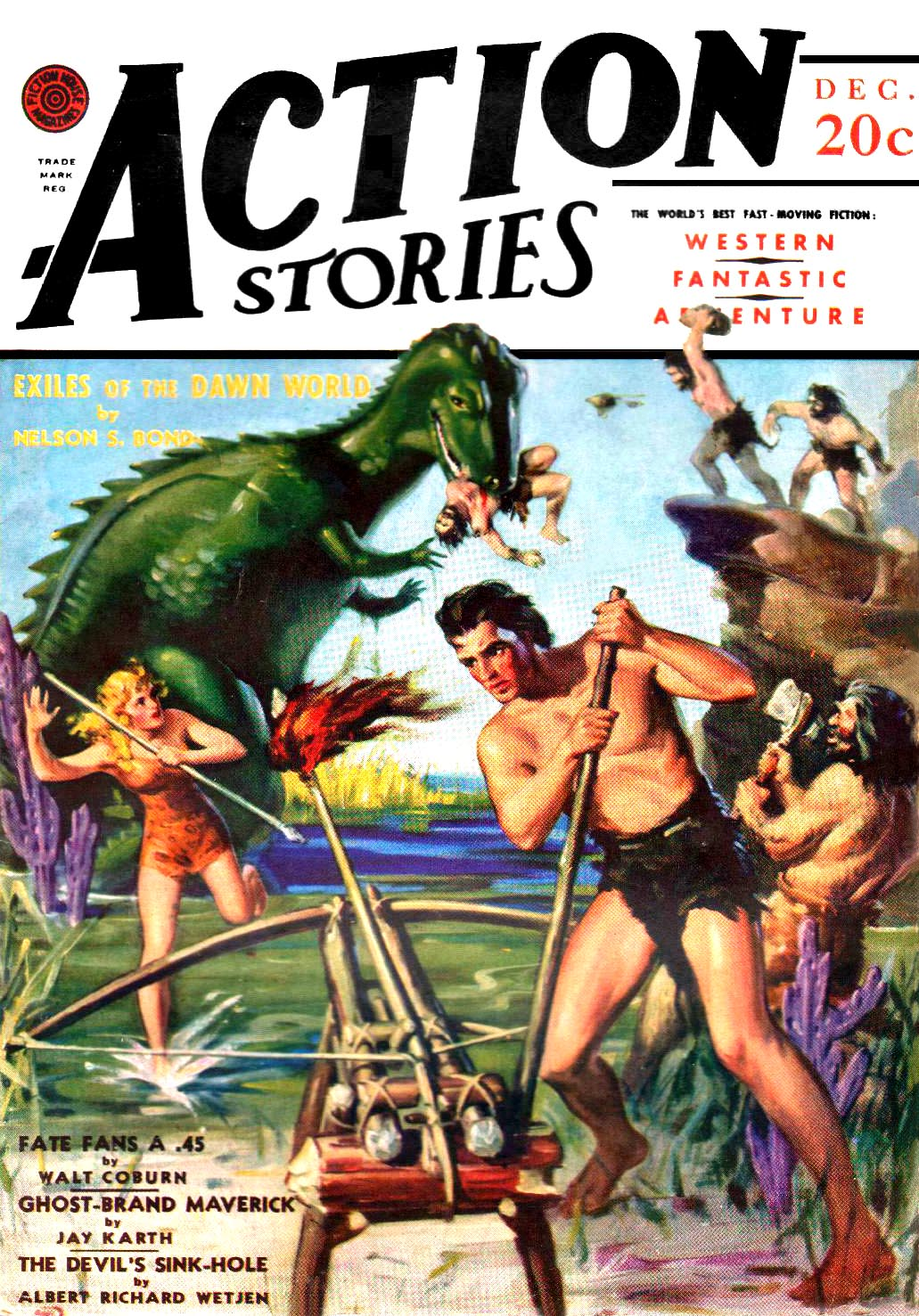
Cavemen anachronistically fighting a dinosaur on the cover of an issue of Action Stories (1940).

Caveman-like heraldic "wild men" were found in European and African iconography for hundreds of years. During the Middle Ages, these beings were generally depicted in art and literature as bearded and covered in hair, and often wielding clubs and dwelling in caves. While wild men were always depicted as living outside of civilization, it was not always clear whether they were human or non-human.

In Sir Arthur Conan Doyle's The Lost World (1912), ape-men are depicted in a fight with modern humans. How the First Letter Was Written and How the Alphabet was Made are two of Rudyard Kipling's Just So Stories (1902) featuring a group of cave-people. Edgar Rice Burroughs adapted this idea for The Land That Time Forgot (1918). A genre of cavemen films emerged, typified by D. W. Griffith's Man's Genesis (1912); they inspired Charles Chaplin's satiric take in His Prehistoric Past (1914), as well as Brute Force (1914), The Cave Man (1912), and later, Cave Man (1934). From the descriptions, Griffith's characters cannot talk, and use sticks and stones for weapons, while the hero of Cave Man is a Tarzanesque figure who fights dinosaurs. Captain Caveman and the Teen Angels (1977–1980) is an animated comedy depicting the titular caveman as being hairy and carrying clubs, and in one episode extends this trait to other cave dwellers from his time period.

Griffith's Brute Force represents one of the earliest portrayals of cavemen and dinosaurs together, with its depiction of a Ceratosaurus. The film reinforced the incorrect notion that non-avian dinosaurs co-existed with prehistoric humans. The anachronistic combination of cavemen with dinosaurs eventually became a cliché, and has often been intentionally invoked for comedic effect. The comic strips B.C., Alley Oop, the Spanish comic franchise Mortadelo y Filemón, and occasionally The Far Side and Gogs portray "cavemen" with dinosaurs. Gary Larson, in his 1989 book The Prehistory of the Far Side, stated he once felt that he needed to confess his cartooning sins in this regard: "O Father, I Have Portrayed Primitive Man and Dinosaurs In The Same Cartoon". The animated series The Flintstones, a spoof on family sitcoms, portrays the Flintstones even using dinosaurs, pterosaurs and prehistoric mammals as tools, household appliances, vehicles, and construction equipment; some spinoffs of the series also feature Captain Caveman.

== See also ==
- Cave dweller
- Cavegirl, a 2002–03 British TV series
- Cavewoman, a 1993–2009 American comic book series
- Dawn of Humanity, 2015 PBS film
- Man cave
- Neanderthals in popular culture
- Prehistoric fiction
- Walking with Cavemen, 2003 documentary miniseries
- Wild man
