= Marguerite Marsh =

American actress

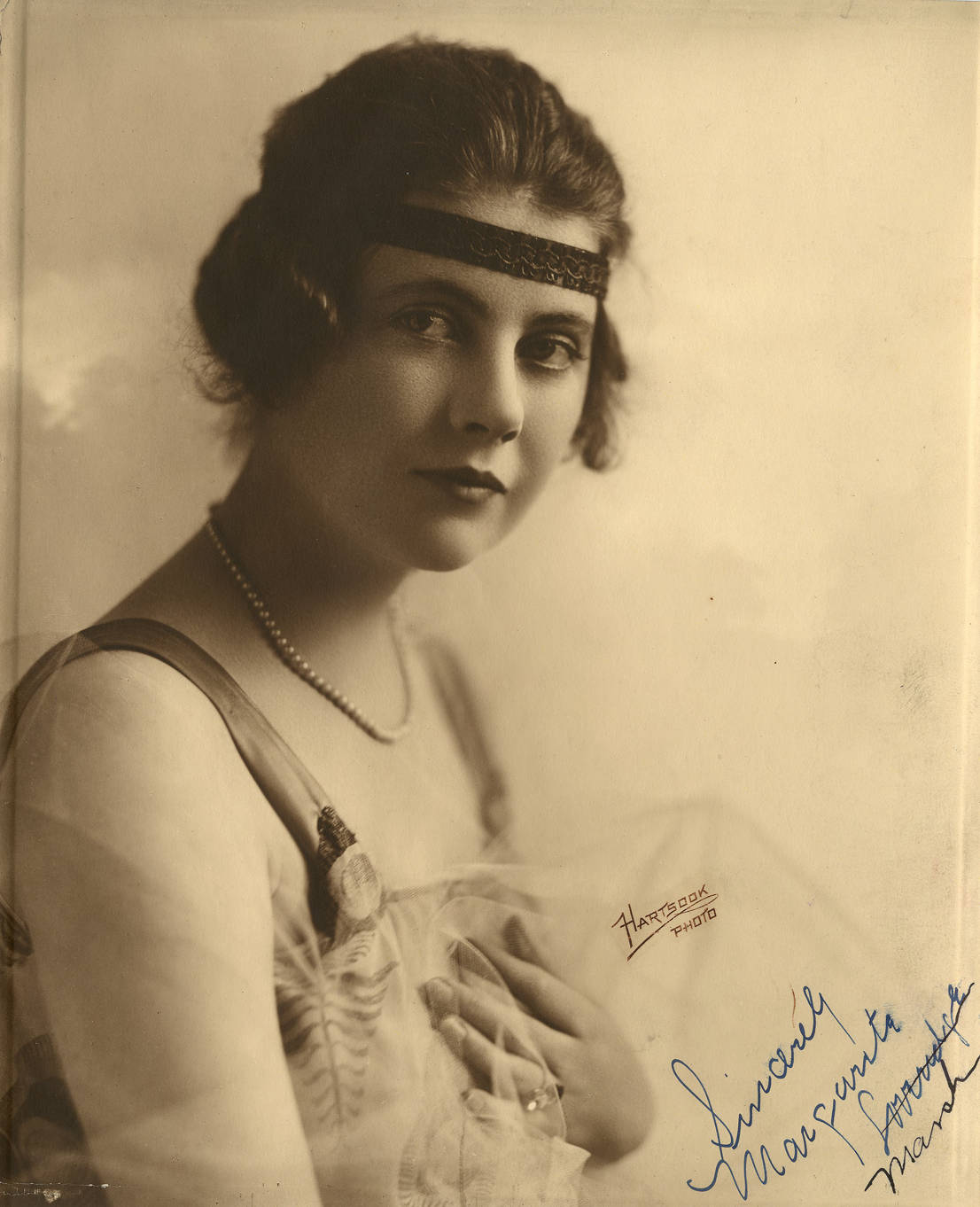
- Marsh in 1924
- Born: April 18, 1888; Lawrence, Kansas, US
- Died: December 8, 1925 (aged 37); New York City, US
- Other names: Margarita Loveridge; Marguerite Loveridge; Margaret Marsh
- Occupation: Actress
- Years active: 1911–1923
- Relatives: Mae Marsh (sister); Frances Marsh (sister); Oliver T. Marsh (brother); Warne Marsh (nephew)

Marguerite Marsh (April 18, 1888 – December 8, 1925) was an American actress of the silent era. She appeared in more than 70 films from 1911 to 1923. Early in her career, she was known as Margaret Loveridge.

== Early life ==
Marsh was the eldest child of S. Charles Marsh and May T. Warne, born in Lawrence, Kansas. She was the sister of actress Mae Marsh, editor Frances Marsh, and cinematographer Oliver T. Marsh, and the aunt of jazz saxophonist Warne Marsh.

== Family ==
According to the 1910 census for Los Angeles, California, Margeurite Marsh lived with her mother, May and stepfather, William Hall. She was listed as being married to Donald Loveridge with a daughter, Leslie Loveridge. Her daughter appeared in one film, The Battle of Elderbush Gulch (1913), with Marguerite's sister Mae.

== Career ==
In 1915, she joined the Reliance-Majestic Studios; The Housemaid was her first film for this company. Earlier, she had worked for the Biograph Company and Keystone Studios. She starred in Grossman Pictures films.

She died in New York City from complications of bronchial pneumonia.

== Partial filmography ==
- Under Burning Skies (1912, Short) - At Farewell Party
- A Voice from the Deep (1912, Short) - The Girl
- Just Like a Woman (1912, Short) - In Club
- The New York Hat (1912, Short) - Windowshopper (uncredited)
- Threads of Destiny (1914) - The Nun
- Without Hope (1914) - Hope Frenchman
- Runaway June (1915) - Tommy Thomas / Marie the Apache
- The Price of Power (1916) - Daisy Brooks
- Little Meena's Romance (1916) - Meena's Cousin
- Susan Rocks the Boat (1916) - (uncredited)
- Mr. Goode, Samaritan (1916) - Evelina Good
- Casey at the Bat (1916) - The Judge's Daughter
- The Devil's Needle (1916) - Patricia Devon
- Intolerance (1916) - Debutante
- The Americano (1916)
- Fields of Honor (1918) - Helene
- Our Little Wife (1918) - Angie Martin
- Conquered Hearts (1918) - Nora Carrigan
- The Master Mystery (1918) - Eva Brent
- The Carter Case (1919) - Anita Carver
- A Royal Democrat (1919)
- The Eternal Magdalene (1919) - Elizabeth Bradshaw
- The Phantom Honeymoon (1919) - Betty Truesdale
- Wits vs. Wits (1920) - Helen Marsley
- Women Men Love (1920) - Evelyn Hunter
- The Idol of the North (1921) - Gloria Waldron
- Oh Mary Be Careful (1921) - Susie
- Boomerang Bill (1922) - Annie
- Iron to Gold (1922) - Anne Kirby
- Face to Face (1922) - Helen Marsley
- The Lion's Mouse (1923) - Olga Beverley

== Sources ==
- 1900 United States Federal Census, El Paso Ward 2, El Paso, Texas; Roll T623_1631; Page: 6A; Enumeration District: 21.
- 1910 United States Federal Census, Los Angeles Assembly District 75, Los Angeles, California; Roll T624_84; Page: 4A; Enumeration District: 100; Image: 1107.
- Bismarck, North Dakota "Marguerite Marsh Dies", The Bismarck Tribune, December 9, 1925, p. 1.
