= Fields of Honor (1918 film) =

1918 film by Ralph Ince

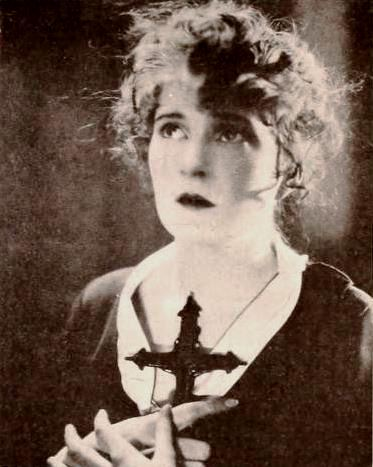
Mae Marsh in Fields of Honor, c.1918

Fields of Honor is a 1918 five-part film adapted from a story by Irvin S. Cobb. Ralph Ince directed. Advertising for the film described it as a dramatic portrayal of what women are sacrificing to the world war. It was produced by Samuel Goldwyn. It is not held at the Library of Congress.

== Cast ==
- Mae Marsh
- Vernon Steele
- Marguerite Marsh
- George Cooper
- John Wessel
- Nell Moran
- Maud Cooling
- Ned Hay
- Edward Lynch
