= Isabel Jeans =

English actress (1891–1985)

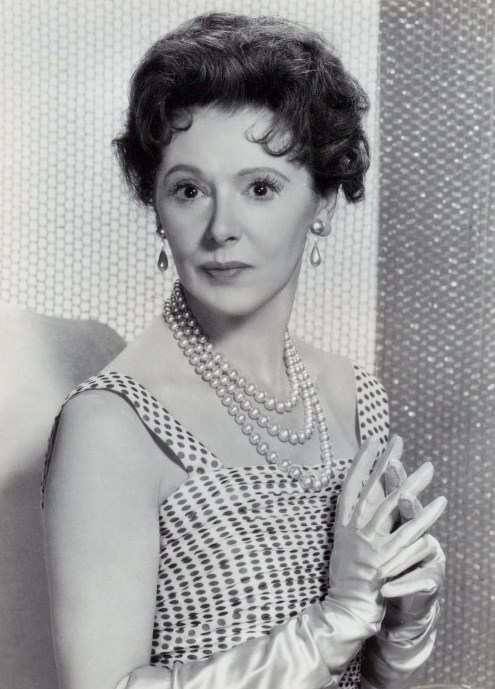
- Jeans in the trailer for the film Gigi (1958)
- Born: 16 September 1891; London, England
- Died: 4 September 1985 (aged 93); London, England
- Years active: 1917–1972
- Spouses: Claude Rains (m. 1913; div. 1915) Gilbert Wakefield (m. 1920; died 1963)

Isabel Jeans (16 September 1891 – 4 September 1985) was an English stage and film actress known for her roles in several Alfred Hitchcock films and her portrayal of Aunt Alicia in the 1958 musical film Gigi.

== Early life and career ==
Born in London, Jeans was the daughter of an art critic.

She planned to become a singer but began her career on the London stage in 1908 at age 15, at the invitation of Herbert Beerbohm Tree. An early appearance on Broadway was in The Man Who Married a Dumb Wife in January 1915 and as Titania in A Midsummer Night's Dream in February 1915. She played Lady Mercia Merivale in the London musical hit Kissing Time (1919). She appeared in a production of James Elroy Flecker's Hassan at His Majesty's Theatre in London in 1923. Incidental music for the play was by Frederick Delius, and the ballet in the House-of-the-Moving Walls was created by Fokine. In 1924, she appeared in Ivor Novello's play The Rat at the Prince of Wales's Theatre in London. The following year, she was in Richard Brinsley Sheridan's play The Rivals at the Lyric Theatre, Hammersmith, together with her ex-husband Claude Rains, his ex-wife Marie Hemingway, and his then-current wife Beatrix Thomson.

== Films and later years ==
She appeared in major roles in two Alfred Hitchcock silent films, Downhill (1927) and Easy Virtue (1928) and various other British films, then played a number of grande dames in Hollywood films, such as Suspicion (1941), Banana Ridge (1942), Gigi (1958) and A Breath of Scandal (1960).

Later stage roles included The Beggar's Opera at the Comedy Theatre, London in 1935, a revival of The Happy Hypocrite in 1936. Later Broadway roles were Crystal Wetherby in The Man in Possession in 1930 and Mrs. Emmeline Lucas in Make Way for Lucia in 1948. English productions included Anton Chekhov's play The Seagull (1949 at the Lyric Theatre, London and St. James's Theatre), Jean Anouilh's play, "Ardele" (1951 at the Vaudeville Theatre), Noël Coward's play, The Vortex (1952 at the Lyric Theatre in Hammersmith), T. S. Eliot's play The Confidential Clerk (1953 at the Lyric Theatre), William Congreve's play The Double Dealer (1959 at the Old Vic Theatre, and other plays there that season.

She also acted in West End productions of plays by Oscar Wilde, including Lady Windermere's Fan (1945 at the Haymarket Theatre, directed by John Gielgud and 1966 at the Phoenix Theatre (London)), A Woman of No Importance (1953 at the Savoy Theatre) and as Lady Bracknell in The Importance of Being Earnest (1968 at the Haymarket Theatre).

== Family and personal life ==
Jeans' brother Desmond was an actor and boxer, and her sister Ursula became a respected character actress.

She was married twice: first to the actor Claude Rains, from 1913 to 1915, and then to the barrister and playwright Gilbert Edward "Gilley" Wakefield from 1920 until his death in 1963.

== Partial filmography ==
- The Profligate (1917) - Janet Preece
- Tilly of Bloomsbury (1921) - Sylvia Mainwaring
- The Rat (1925) - Zelie de Chaumet
- Windsor Castle (1926)
- The Triumph of the Rat (1926) - Zelie de Chaumet
- Downhill (1927) - Julia Fotheringale
- Further Adventures of a Flag Officer (1927) - Pauline
- Easy Virtue (1928) - Larita Filton
- The Return of the Rat (1929) - Zélia de Chaumet Boucheron
- Power Over Men (1929) - Marion Delacour
- Sally Bishop (1932) - Dolly Durlacher
- Rolling in Money (1934) - Duchess of Braceborough
- The Dictator (1935) - Von Eyben
- The Crouching Beast (1935) - The Pellegrini
- Tovarich (1937) - Fermonde Dupont
- Fools for Scandal (1938) - Lady Paula Malverton
- Secrets of an Actress (1938) - Marian Plantagenet
- Youth Takes a Fling (1938) - Mrs. Merrivale
- Garden of the Moon (1938) - Mrs. Lornay
- Hard to Get (1938) - Mrs. Richards
- Good Girls Go to Paris (1939) - Caroline Brand
- Man About Town (1939) - Mme. Dubois
- Suspicion (1941) - Mrs. Newsham
- Banana Ridge (1942) - Sue Long
- Great Day (1945) - Lady Mott
- Elizabeth of Ladymead (1948) - Mother in 1903
- Souvenir d'Italie (1957) - Cynthia
- Gigi (1958) - Aunt Alicia
- A Breath of Scandal (1960) - Princess Eugénie
- Heavens Above! (1963) - Lady Despard
- The Magic Christian (1969) - Dame Agnes Grand
- Clouds of Witness (1972 BBC TV miniseries) - Dowager Duchess

== Selected stage credits ==
- Make Way for Lucia by John Van Druten (1948)
