= The Triumph of the Rat =

1926 film by Graham Cutts

- Ivor Novello screenshot
- Directed by: Graham Cutts
- Written by: Graham Cutts; Reginald Fogwell; Ivor Novello; Constance Collier
- Produced by: Michael Balcon
- Starring: Ivor Novello; Isabel Jeans; Nina Vanna
- Cinematography: Hal Young
- Production company: Gainsborough Pictures
- Distributed by: Woolf & Freedman Film Service
- Release date: September 1926
- Running time: 74 minutes
- Country: United Kingdom

The Triumph of the Rat is a 1926 British silent film drama, directed by Graham Cutts for Gainsborough Pictures and starring Ivor Novello, Isabel Jeans and Nina Vanna.

== Background ==
The film is the second in a trilogy featuring Novello as Pierre Boucheron (The Rat), following the popular success of the previous year's The Rat. Both films were based on plays cowrittened by Ivor Novello, Graham Cutts, Constance Collier and Reginald Fogwell. Jeans also returned to reprise her role from the first film, as did Marie Ault and Julie Suedo. A notable absence is the character of Odile, a central figure in The Rat as played by Mae Marsh. At the end of the previous film Pierre had seemingly rejected the lure of life in high society as represented by the Jeans character of Zélie, and he and Odile had finally realised the depth of their love for each other. However The Triumph of the Rat finds him back with Zélie, and not only does Odile not appear in the film, but not even a passing mention is made as to what might have happened in the interim to cause her to disappear so completely from Pierre's life. This reportedly puzzled contemporary audiences, and while some later observers have theorised that The Triumph of the Rat is meant to present an alternative reality in which Pierre chose Zélie over Odile at the end of the original film, there is no evidence that anything so sophisticated was ever the intention.

== Plot ==
The film opens with Pierre comfortably ensconced as the kept man of his old sparring-partner Zélie, who has apparently made good on her previous claims that she could transform him from a criminal ruffian into a gentleman accepted by the upper echelons of Parisian society. While he appears to relish his new-found social status, Zélie attempts to keep him on a tight rein by constantly reminding him that just as she pulled him up from the gutter, so can she send him back there if he displeases her.

While mixing in rarefied social circles, Pierre develops an admiration for the titled Madeleine de l'Orme (Vanna), which does not go unnoticed by Zélie. She taunts him that while he may have piqued her interest, a true member of the aristocracy will always be out of his reach. He assures her that if he sets his mind to it, he will be able to hook Madeleine. Zélie challenges him to prove it. He sets about wooing Madeleine, and Zélie gradually realises to her horror that he is doing it in earnest rather than just to prove a point, and moreover is succeeding rather well. Carrying through her previous warnings, she takes her revenge and Pierre finds himself consigned back to his old haunt, the sordid White Coffin Club. There he is greeted warmly by his old colleague Mou-Mou (Suedo). However things have changed while he has been away and he is no longer ruler of the White Coffin roost. He is challenged to a knife fight which, unthinkably, he loses. In his shame he feels he can no longer show his face in the White Coffin, and spirals ever deeper into despair and destitution until he is finally reduced to scavenging among stray dogs for discarded scraps of food.

== Cast ==
- Ivor Novello as Pierre Boucheron
- Isabel Jeans as Zélie de Chaumet
- Nina Vanna as Madeleine de l'Orme
- Marie Ault as Mère Colline
- Julie Suedo as Mou Mou
- Lewin Mannering as Comte Henri Mercereau
- Adeline Hayden Coffin as Duchesse de l'Orme
- Charles Dormer as René Duval
