= Under Burning Skies =

1912 film

- Directed by: D. W. Griffith
- Written by: Stanner E. V. Taylor
- Starring: Blanche Sweet; Wilfred Lucas
- Cinematography: G. W. Bitzer
- Distributed by: Biograph Company
- Release date: February 22, 1912
- Running time: 17 minutes
- Country: United States
- Language: Silent (English intertitles)

Under Burning Skies is a 1912 American short silent drama film directed by D. W. Griffith and starring Blanche Sweet.

== Cast ==
- Wilfred Lucas as Joe
- Blanche Sweet as Emily
- W. Christy Cabanne as Emily's Husband
- Alfred Paget as Emily's Husband's Friend
- Edwin August as On Street
- Frank Evans as In Bar
- Charles Gorman as In Bar
- Robert Harron as On Street / At Farewell Party
- Charles Hill Mailes as In Bar / At Farewell Party
- Marguerite Marsh as At Farewell Party
- Claire McDowell as A Friend
- W. Chrystie Miller as At Farewell Party
- W. C. Robinson as On Street
- Charles West as The Bartender (as Charles H. West)

== See also ==
- List of American films of 1912
- D. W. Griffith filmography
- Blanche Sweet filmography
