= George G. Harrap and Co. =

British publisher

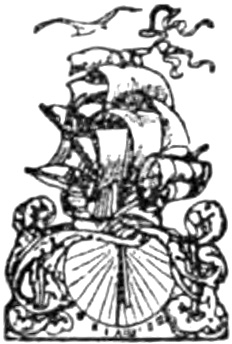
Logo of George G. Harrap and Co. from a 1929 book

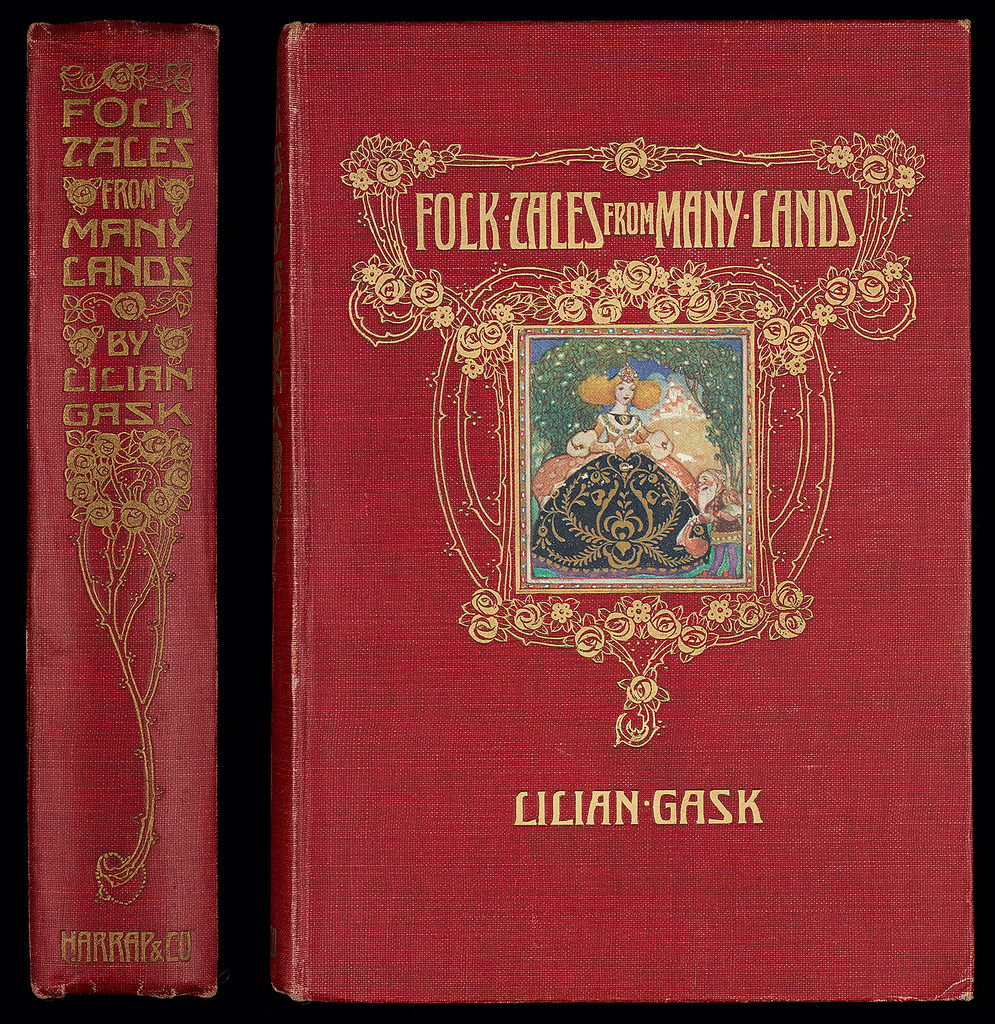
Book cover Folk tales from many lands by Lilian Gask, published 1910 by Harrap&Co

George G. Harrap, Ltd (officially: George G. Harrap and Company Limited, London, Bombay) was a publisher of speciality books, many of them educational, such as the memoirs of Winston Churchill, or highly illustrated with line drawings, engravings or etchings, such as the much republished classic educational children's book The Cave Boy of the Age of Stone from at least 1901 into the 1980s.

Publishers of English classics for the educational trade, Harrap was also known for publishing finely illustrated books by Rackham, Gooden, and others, and as the publisher of Winston Churchill.

— Antiquarian Booksellers' Association of America listing, about catalog listing of book: HARRAP, George G. Some Memories, 1901 – 1935
(subtitled: "A Publisher's Contribution to the History of Publishing").

In 1992, George G. Harrap and Co. was acquired and became part of Chambers Harrap of Scotland, a subsidiary of the French publisher CEP. Havas acquired CEP in 1997; Havas was then acquired by Vivendi in 1998. Vivendi sold its European book publishing to Lagardère Group in 2002.

In September 2009 the Edinburgh offices of Harrap, as part of Chambers Harrap, were closed. The Harrap's section has been moved to Paris, where, according to a press release by the owners, the plan is for Hachette Larousse publishers to manage it directly.

== Book series ==
- Harrap's Bilingual Series
- Harrap's Modern English Series
- Harrap's Shilling Library
- Harrap's Modern English Series
- Harrap's Standard Fiction Library
