= Mae Marsh =

American actress (1894–1968)

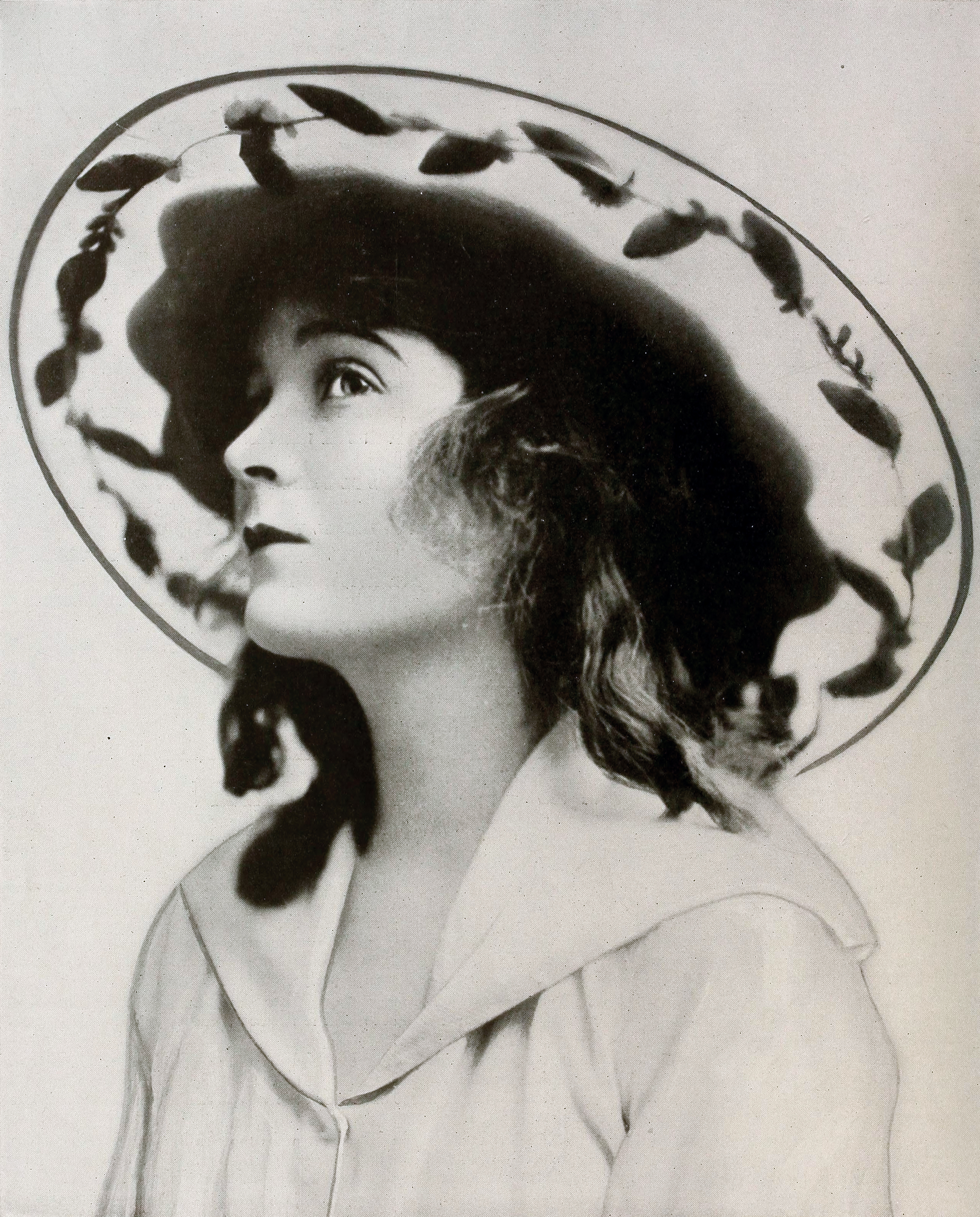
- Publicity photo of Marsh, 1916
- Born: Mary Warne Marsh; November 9, 1894; Madrid, New Mexico Territory, U.S.
- Died: February 13, 1968 (aged 73); Hermosa Beach, California, U.S.
- Resting place: Pacific Crest Cemetery; Redondo Beach, California
- Occupation: Actress
- Years active: 1910–1964
- Spouse: Louis Lee Arms (m. 1918)
- Children: 4
- Relatives: Marguerite Marsh (sister); Frances Marsh (sister); Oliver T. Marsh (brother); Warne Marsh (nephew)

Mae Marsh (born Mary Warne Marsh; November 9, 1894 – February 13, 1968) was an American film actress whose career spanned over 50 years. She was a film star during the silent era and known for her work with D. W. Griffith, including on his films The Birth of a Nation (1915) and Intolerance (1916).

== Early life ==
Mae Marsh was born Mary Warne Marsh in Madrid, New Mexico Territory, on November 9, 1894. She was one of seven children of Mae T. (née Warne) and Stephen Charles Marsh. By 1900, the Marsh family had moved to El Paso, Texas, where Mary's father worked as a bartender. Mae's father died in 1901, and the following year, her mother married William Hall, a native of Virginia. The family later moved to California, where Mae attended Convent of the Sacred Heart School in Hollywood as well as public school.

A frequently told story of Marsh's childhood is "Her father, a railroad auditor, died when she was four. Her family moved to San Francisco, California, where her stepfather was killed in the great earthquake of 1906. Her great-aunt then took Mae and her older sister Marguerite to Los Angeles, hoping her show business background would open doors for jobs at various movie studios needing extras." However, her father, S. Charles Marsh, was a bartender, not a railroad auditor, and he was alive at least as late as June 1900, when Marsh was nearly six. Her stepfather, oil-field inspector William Hall, could not have been killed in the 1906 earthquake, as he was alive, listed in the 1910 census, living with her mother and sisters.

Marsh worked as a salesgirl and loitered around the Hollywood sets and locations while her older sister worked on a film, observing the progress of her sister's performance. She first started as an extra in various movies, and played her first substantial role in the film Ramona (1910) at the age of 15.

"I tagged my way into motion pictures," Marsh recalled in The Silent Picture. "I used to follow my sister Marguerite to the old Biograph studio and then, one great day, Mr. Griffith noticed me, put me in a picture and I had my chance. I love my work and though new and very wonderful interests have entered my life, I still love it and couldn't think of giving it up."

== Career ==
=== Early work at Biograph (1910–1914) ===
Marsh worked with D. W. Griffith in small roles at Biograph when they were filming in California and in New York. Her big break came when Mary Pickford, resident star of the Biograph lot and a married woman at that time, refused to play the bare-legged, grass-skirted role of Lily-White in Man's Genesis. Griffith announced that if Pickford would not play that part in Man's Genesis, she would not play the coveted title role in his next film, The Sands of Dee. The other actresses stood behind Pickford, each refusing in turn to play the part, citing the same objection.

Years later, Marsh recalled in an interview in The Silent Picture: "...and he called rehearsal, and we were all there and he said, 'Well now, Miss Marsh, you can rehearse this.' And Mary Pickford said 'What!' and Mr. Griffith said 'Yes, Mary Pickford, if you don't do what I tell you I want you to do, I'm going to have someone else do The Sands of Dee. Mary Pickford didn't play Man's Genesis so Mae can play The Sands of Dee.' Of course, I was thrilled, and she was very much hurt. And I thought, 'Well it's all right with me. That is something.' I was, you know, just a lamebrain."

Working with Mack Sennett and D. W. Griffith, she became a prolific actress and was often paired with fellow Sennett protégé Robert Harron in romantic roles.

=== The Birth of a Nation (1915) ===
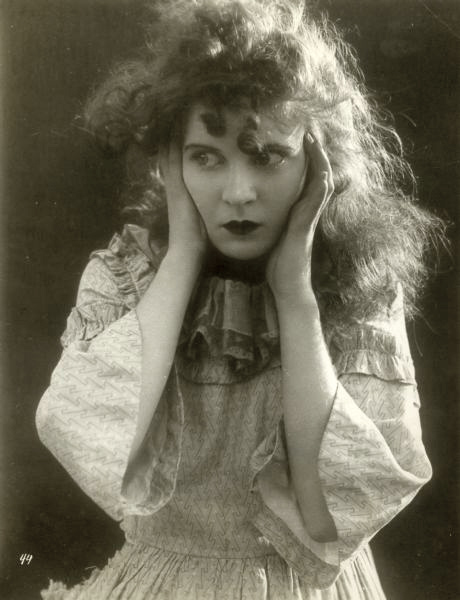
Marsh in The Birth of a Nation (1915)

Marsh, in the memoir Screen Acting (1921), recalled her performance as "Little Sister" in the "cellar scene" in which Union cavalry invade the Cameron family plantation in The Birth of a Nation, an example of her "counter-dramatic" acting:

It was a matter of some moment of how [my character] the Little Sister would be affected. I can hear your average director: "Roll your eyes" he would say, "Cry! Drop to your knees in terror!" In other words, it would be the same old stuff...

Mr. Griffith, when he came to the cellar scene, asked me if there had been a time in my life when I had been filled with terror:

"Yes," I said.

"What did you do?" he inquired.

"I laughed," I answered.

He saw the point immediately. "Good" he said, "let's try it."

It was the hysterical laugh of the little girl in the cellar...that was far more effective than rolling the eyes or weeping would have been.

=== Intolerance (1916) ===
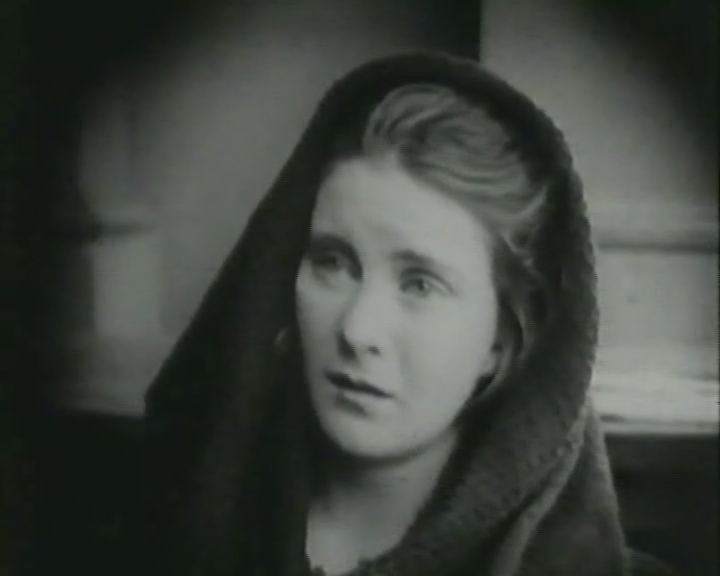
Marsh in Intolerance (1916)

D. W. Griffith's cinematic handling of the courtroom episode in Intolerance, in particular his use of close-ups for "dramatic intensity," are widely recognized. According to film historian Paul O'Dell, "Mae Marsh gave to Intolerance one of her most memorable" portrayals, identifying her role as the "Dear One" as integral to the film's success:

Much more mention should be made of the performance of Mae Marsh, which in this scene reaches one of its many peaks. Sir Alexander Korda included her performance as one of the most outstanding pieces of acting in the silent film era, and June Berry rated her playing of the Dear One as only second to Falconetti's Joan of Arc (1928).

Mae Marsh, in her 1923 memoir Screen Acting, comments on her struggle to fully deliver the sequence: "The hardest dramatic work I ever did was the courtroom scene in Intolerance. We retook the scenes on four different occasions. Each time I gave to the limit of my vitality and ability. I put everything into my portrayal that was in me..."

=== Later silent films (1916–1928) ===
Marsh signed a lucrative contract with Samuel Goldwyn worth $2,500 per week after Intolerance, but none of the films she made with him were particularly successful. After her marriage to Lee Arms, a publicity agent for Goldwyn, in 1918, her film output decreased to about one per year.

She starred in the 1918 film Fields of Honor. Marsh's last notable starring role was as a flapper for Griffith in The White Rose (1923) with Ivor Novello and Carol Dempster. She re-teamed with Novello for the film version of his hit stage play The Rat (1925).

=== Sound films (1931–1964) ===
Marsh returned from retirement to appear in sound films and played a role in Henry King's remake of Over the Hill (1931). She gravitated toward character roles, and worked in this manner for the next several decades. Marsh appeared in numerous popular films, such as Rebecca of Sunnybrook Farm (1932) and Little Man, What Now? (1934). She co-starred with Henry B. Walthall again in Bachelor of Arts (1934). She also became a favorite of director John Ford, appearing in The Grapes of Wrath (1940), How Green Was My Valley (1941), 3 Godfathers (1948), and The Searchers (1956).

=== Recognition and honors ===
In 1955, Marsh was awarded the George Eastman Award, given by George Eastman House for distinguished contribution to the art of film.

Marsh has a star on the Hollywood Walk of Fame located at 1600 Vine Street.

== Personal life ==
Marsh married Louis Lee Arms, Samuel Goldwyn's publicity agent, in Manhattan on September 21, 1918. The couple, who had four children, remained together for 50 years, until 1968, when Marsh died from a heart attack at Hermosa Beach, California.

== Death ==
Marsh died from a heart attack at Hermosa Beach, California, on February 13, 1968. Louis died at the age of 101 on June 11, 1989. They are buried together in Section 5 at Pacific Crest Cemetery in Redondo Beach, California.

== Filmography ==
=== Shorts ===
Year	Title	Role	Notes
1910	Ramona		
1910	Serious Sixteen		
1911	Fighting Blood		
1912	The Siren of Impulse		
1912	A Voice from the Deep	On beach	Uncredited; Lost film
1912	Just Like a Woman	In club	
1912	One Is Business, the Other Crime		
1912	The Lesser Evil	The young woman's companion	
1912	The Old Actor		
1912	When Kings Were the Law	At court	Uncredited
1912	A Beast at Bay	The young woman's friend	
1912	Home Folks	At barn dance	
1912	A Temporary Truce	A murdered settler	Uncredited
1912	Lena and the Geese	The 'adopted' daughter	
1912	The Spirit Awakened	The renegade farmhand's sweetheart	Lost film
1912	The School Teacher and the Waif	Schoolgirl	
1912	An Indian Summer	The widow's daughter	Lost film
1912	Man's Genesis	Lillywhite	
1912	The Sands of Dee	Mary	
1912	The Inner Circle		
1912	The Kentucky Girl	Belle Hopkins – Bob's sister	Lost film
1912	The Parasite	Rose Fletcher	Lost film
1912	Two Daughters of Eve		
1912	For the Honor of the Seventh	The girl in town	Lost film
1912	Brutality	The young woman	
1912	The New York Hat	Second gossip	
1912	The Indian Uprising at Santa Fe	Juan	Lost film
1913	Three Friends	The wife's friend	Lost film
1913	The Telephone Girl and the Lady	The telephone girl	
1913	An Adventure in the Autumn Woods	The girl	Lost film
1913	The Tender Hearted Boy	The tender-hearted boy's sweetheart	Lost film
1913	Love in an Apartment Hotel	Angelina Millingford, a maid	Lost film
1913	Broken Ways	Minor role	Uncredited
1913	A Girl's Stratagem	The young woman	Lost film
1913	Near to Earth	One of Marie's friends	Lost film
1913	Fate	Mother, loving family	
1913	The Perfidy of Mary	Mary	
1913	The Little Tease	The little tease, as an adult	
1913	The Lady and the Mouse	Minor role	Uncredited
1913	The Wanderer	The other parents' daughter, as an adult	
1913	His Mother's Son	The daughter	
1913	A Timely Interception	Minor role	Uncredited
1913	The Mothering Heart	Minor role	Uncredited
1913	Her Mother's Oath	In church	Lost film
1913	The Reformers	The daughter	Lost film
1913	Two Men of the Desert		Lost film
1913	Primitive Man		
1913	For the Son of the House	The young woman	Lost film
1913	Influence of the Unknown	The young woman	Lost film
1913	The Battle at Elderbush Gulch	Sally Cameron	
1914	Brute Force	Lillywhite	
1915	The Victim	Mary Hastings, Frank's wife	Lost film
1915	Big Jim's Heart		Lost film

=== Silent features ===
Year	Title	Role	Notes
1914	Judith of Bethulia	Naomi	
1914	The Great Leap; Until Death Do Us Part	Mary Gibbs	Lost film
1914	Home, Sweet Home	Apple Pie Mary Smith	
1914	The Escape	Jennie Joyce	Lost film
1914	The Avenging Conscience	The maid	
1914	Moonshine Molly	Molly Boone	Lost film
1915	The Birth of a Nation	Flora Cameron – the pet sister	
1915	The Outcast	The girl of the slums	
1915	The Outlaw's Revenge	The American lover	Lost film
1915	Her Shattered Idol	Mae Carter	
1916	Hoodoo Ann	Hoodoo Ann	
1916	A Child of the Paris Streets	Julie / the child-wife	
1916	A Child of the Streets		Lost film
1916	The Wild Girl of the Sierras	The wild girl	Lost film
1916	The Marriage of Molly-O	Molly-O	Lost film
1916	Intolerance	The Dear One	
1916	The Little Liar	Maggie	Lost film
1916	The Wharf Rat	Carmen Wagner	Lost film
1917	Polly of the Circus	Polly	
1917	Sunshine Alley	Nell	Lost film
1917	The Cinderella Man	Marjorie Caner	
1918	Field of Honor	Marie Messereau	Lost film
1918	The Beloved Traitor	Mary Garland	
1918	The Face in the Dark	Jane Ridgeway	Lost film
1918	All Woman	Susan Sweeney	Lost film
1918	The Glorious Adventure	Carey Wethersbee	Lost film
1918	Money Mad	Elsie Dean	Lost film
1918	Hidden Fires	Peggy Murray / Louise Parke	Lost film
1918	The Racing Strain	Lucille Cameron	Lost film
1919	The Bondage of Barbara	Barbara Grey	Lost film
1919	Spotlight Sadie	Sadie Sullivan	Lost film
1919	The Mother and the Law	The Little Dear One	
1920	The Little 'Fraid Lady	Cecilia Carne	Lost film
1921	Nobody's Kid	Mary Cary	Lost film
1922	Till We Meet Again	Marion Bates	Lost film
1922	Flames of Passion	Dorothy Hawke	
1923	Paddy the Next Best Thing	Paddy	Lost film
1923	The White Rose	Bessie 'Teazie' Williams	
1924	Daddies	Ruth Atkins	
1924	Arabella	Arabella	Lost film
1925	Tides of Passion	Charity	Lost film
1925	The Rat	Odile Etrange	
1928	Racing Through		Lost film

=== Sound ===
Year	Title	Role	Notes
1931	Over the Hill	Ma Shelby	
1932	Rebecca of Sunnybrook Farm	Aunt Jane	
1932	That's My Boy	Mom Scott	
1933	Alice in Wonderland	Sheep	
1934	Little Man, What Now?	Wife of Karl Goebbler	
1935	Bachelor of Arts	Mrs. Mary Barth	
1935	Black Fury	Mrs. Mary Novak	
1936	Hollywood Boulevard	Carlotta Blakeford	
1939	Drums Along the Mohawk	Pioneer woman	Uncredited
1939	Heaven with a Barbed Wire Fence	Empire State Building tourist	Uncredited
1939	Swanee River	Mrs. Jonathan Fry	Uncredited
1940	The Man Who Wouldn't Talk	Mrs. Stetson	
1940	The Grapes of Wrath	Muley's wife	Uncredited
1940	Four Sons	Townswoman	Uncredited
1940	Young People	Maria Liggett	
1941	Tobacco Road	County clerk's assistant	Uncredited
1941	The Cowboy and the Blonde	Office worker	Uncredited
1941	For Beauty's Sake	Night manager	Uncredited
1941	Belle Starr	Preacher's wife	Uncredited
1941	Great Guns	Aunt Martha	
1941	Swamp Water	Mrs. McCord	Uncredited
1941	How Green Was My Valley	Miner's wife	Uncredited
1941	Remember the Day	Teacher	Uncredited
1942	Blue, White and Perfect	Mrs. Bertha Toby	
1942	Son of Fury: The Story of Benjamin Blake	Mrs. Purdy	Uncredited
1942	It Happened in Flatbush	Aunt Mae, team co-owner	Uncredited
1942	Tales of Manhattan	Molly	Robinson sequence
1942	Just Off Broadway	Autograph seeker	Uncredited
1942	The Loves of Edgar Allan Poe	Mrs. Phillips	Uncredited
1942	The Man in the Trunk	Mrs. Inge	Uncredited
1942	Quiet Please, Murder	Miss Hartwig	Uncredited
1943	The Meanest Man in the World	Old lady	Uncredited
1943	Dixie Dugan	Mrs. Sloan	
1943	The Moon Is Down	Villager	Uncredited
1943	Tonight We Raid Calais	French townswoman	Uncredited
1943	The Song of Bernadette	Madame Blanche – townswoman	Uncredited
1943	Jane Eyre	Leah	Uncredited
1944	The Fighting Sullivans	Neighbor of Mrs. Griffin	Uncredited
1944	Buffalo Bill	Arcade customer	Uncredited
1944	Sweet and Low-Down	Apartment house tenant	Uncredited
1944	In the Meantime, Darling	Emma	Uncredited
1945	A Tree Grows in Brooklyn	Tynmore sister	Uncredited
1945	State Fair	Ring-toss spectator	Uncredited
1945	The Dolly Sisters	Annie	Uncredited
1945	Leave Her to Heaven	Fisherwoman	Uncredited
1946	Johnny Comes Flying Home	Bus passenger	Uncredited
1946	Smoky	Woman watching parade	Uncredited
1946	My Darling Clementine	Simpson's sister	Uncredited
1947	The Late George Apley	Dressmaker	Uncredited
1947	Miracle on 34th Street	Woman in Santa line	Uncredited
1947	Thunder in the Valley	Flower vendor	Uncredited
1947	Mother Wore Tights	Resort guest	Uncredited
1947	Daisy Kenyon	Woman leaving apartment	Uncredited
1948	Fort Apache	Mrs. Gates	
1948	Green Grass of Wyoming	Race spectator	Uncredited
1948	Deep Waters	Molly Thatcher	
1948	The Snake Pit	Tommy's mother	Uncredited
1948	3 Godfathers	Mrs. Perley Sweet	
1949	A Letter to Three Wives	Miss Jenkins	Uncredited
1949	Impact	Mrs. King	
1949	It Happens Every Spring	Greenleaf's maid	Uncredited
1949	The Fighting Kentuckian	Sister Hattie	
1949	Everybody Does It	Higgins – the Borlands' maid	Uncredited
1950	When Willie Comes Marching Home	Mrs. Clara Fettles	Uncredited
1950	The Gunfighter	Mrs. O'Brien	Uncredited
1950	My Blue Heaven	Maid	Uncredited
1950	The Jackpot	Mrs. Woodruff in photo	Uncredited
1951	The Model and the Marriage Broker	Talkative patient	Uncredited
1952	The Quiet Man	Father Paul's mother	Uncredited
1952	Night Without Sleep	Maid	Uncredited
1953	The Sun Shines Bright	G.A.R. woman at the ball	
1953	Titanic	Woman to whom Norman gave his seat	Uncredited
1953	Powder River	Townswoman	Uncredited
1953	A Blueprint for Murder	Anna Swenson – Lynne's housekeeper	Uncredited
1953	The Robe	Jerusalem woman aiding Demetrius	Uncredited
1954	A Star Is Born	Malibu party guest	Uncredited
1955	Prince of Players	Witch in 'Macbeth'	Uncredited
1955	The Tall Men	Emigrant	Uncredited
1955	The Girl Rush	Casino patron	Uncredited
1955	Good Morning, Miss Dove	Woman in bank	Uncredited
1955	Hell on Frisco Bay	Mrs. Cobb – Steve's landlady	Uncredited
1956	While the City Sleeps	Mrs. Manners	
1956	The Searchers	Dark cloaked woman at fort guarding deranged woman	Uncredited
1956	Girls in Prison	'Grandma' Edwards	
1956	Julie	Hysterical passenger	
1957	The Wings of Eagles	Nurse Crumley	Uncredited
1958	Cry Terror!	Woman in elevator	Scenes deleted Replaced by Marjorie Bennett
1958	The Last Hurrah	Mourner at wake	Uncredited
1960	Sergeant Rutledge	Mrs. Nellie Hackett	Uncredited
1960	From the Terrace	Sandy's governess	Uncredited
1961	Two Rode Together	Hanna Clegg	Uncredited
1963	Donovan's Reef	Family council member	Uncredited
1964	Cheyenne Autumn	Woman	Uncredited
