= Man's Genesis =

Historic extant D. W. Griffith film from 1912

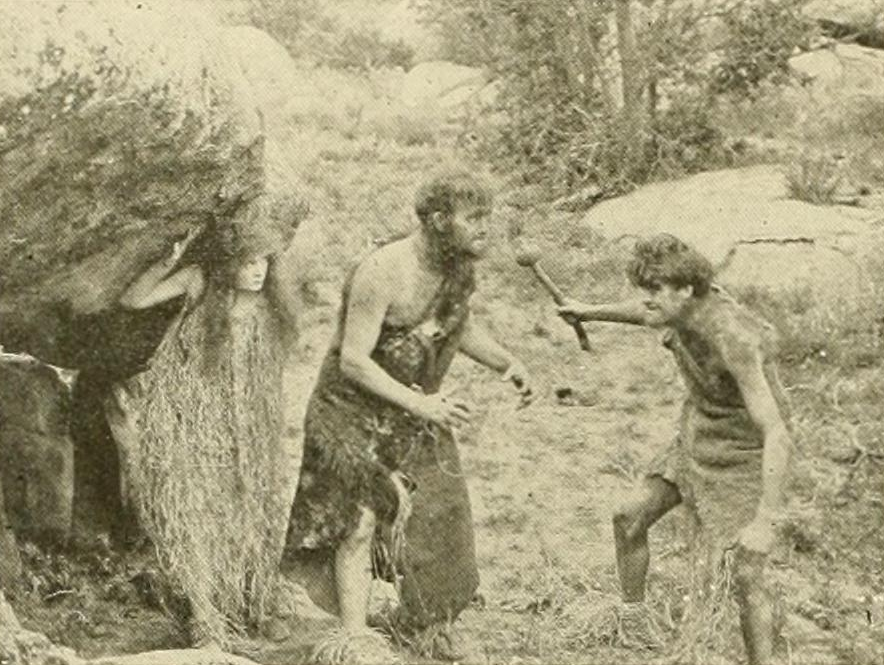
- Scene from Man's Genesis
- Directed by: D. W. Griffith
- Starring: Mae Marsh; Robert Harron; W. Chrystie Miller; Wilfred Lucas; Charles Hill Mailes
- Cinematography: G. W. Bitzer
- Production company: Biograph Company
- Distributed by: Biograph Company
- Release date: July 11, 1912 (United States)
- Running time: 17 minutes
- Country: United States
- Language: Silent (English intertitles)

Man's Genesis is a 1912 American short silent drama film starring Robert Harron and Mae Marsh. It was directed by D. W. Griffith for the Biograph Company and survives from an era from which many films are now lost. The movie's plot involves a grandfather recounting a story about cavemen fighting over a woman to his squabbling grandchildren. The work was described as being the first "primitive man" film ever made and, at the time, as the "greatest photoplay of its kind ever made". It is credited as being responsible for creating the pre-historic film boom that occurred in the following years. The film was re-issued alongside other Biograph films on July 23, 1915.

== Cast ==
- Mae Marsh as Lilywhite
- Robert Harron as Weakhands
- W. Chrystie Miller as Grandfather
- Wilfred Lucas as Bruteforce
- Charles Hill Mailes as Tribe Member
- Claire McDowell as Tribe Member
- W.C. Robinson as Tribe Member

== Plot ==
The film begins with two children in a disagreement that they decide to fix by physically harming each other. The fight is stopped by their grandfather and, as a method to teach them that physical violence is wrong, he tells them a story about Early Man and the conflicts and murders that occurred when strong young cavemen became involved in fistfights. The character Weakhands is, in accordance with his name, unable to win any fights involving his fists and thus is not popular and is unable to win any of the suitor battles. The cavewoman he is attracted to, Lilywhite, is required to go and find a husband after the death of her mother and she finds herself in love with Weakhands because of his nice and gentle nature. However Bruteforce, a violent bully of the tribe, fights off Weakhands and kidnaps Lilywhite to be his wife. After repeated attempts and failures by Weakhands to rescue her, he accidentally comes across the idea of combining a stick and stone into a club-like weapon, thus creating the first true weapon ever made. With this weapon, he is able to defeat Bruteforce and the other men of the tribe and regain Lilywhite as his wife.

== Critical reception ==
A review in The Nebraska State Journal described the film as "marvelous" for being able to combine the themes of "love and hate" and the conflict between weakness and intelligence against brutish strength. It also criticized the "lamentable lack of vision and imagination" of other filmmakers, in a comparison between their works and Man's Genesis. The Fresno Morning Republican called the film a "powerful conception - a real Darwinian thought" and said that it was "marvelously executed". Detailed as "splendidly portrayed" in the Harrisburg Daily Independent, the film was considered to be a "distinct departure" from the other usual films produced in the era, and the newspaper said that it dealt with a "theory of grave importance", Darwin's theory of evolution. Including a description of the plot, The Moving Picture World concluded that the film "enthralls" and that the "illusion is complete" in presenting a realistic world of Early Man. In a review on the 1915 re-issue in The Moving Picture World, the educational content of the film and the use of accurate location filming were praised, with the conclusion that the film had a "tone of individuality which stamps it as a credit to any program". Vachel Lindsay in his 1915 book The Art of the Moving Picture said the film was a "Griffith masterpiece" and considered how the American fascination with automobile tinkering and other mechanical activities reflects on the film's initial creation of tools.

Large amounts of commentary were made, both positive and negative, after a showing of the film in Fresno, California on August 29, 1912, with some audience members criticizing the idea that humans came from ape-like origins as shown in the film.

== See also ==
- List of American films of 1912
- D. W. Griffith filmography
- On the Origin of Species
- On the Genesis of Species
