= Constance Collier =

British actress (1878–1955)

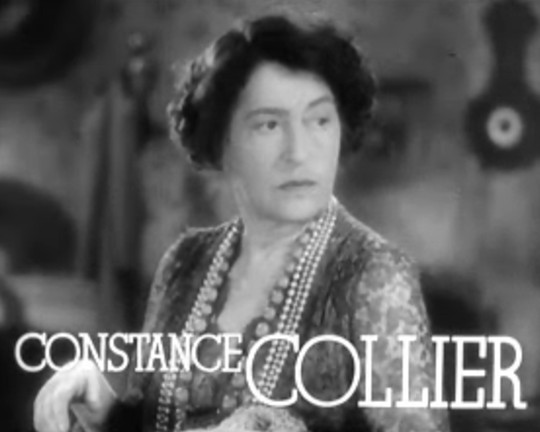
- Collier in the trailer for Stage Door (1937)
- Born: Laura Constance Hardie; 22 January 1878; Windsor, Berkshire, England
- Died: 25 April 1955 (aged 77); New York City, U.S.
- Occupations: Actress; acting coach
- Years active: 1894–1949
- Spouse: Julian L'Estrange (m. 1905; died 1918)

Constance Collier (born Laura Constance Hardie; 22 January 1878 – 25 April 1955) was an English stage and film actress and acting coach. She wrote plays and films with Ivor Novello, and she was the first person to be treated with insulin in Europe.

== Early life and stage career ==
Born Laura Constance Hardie in Windsor, Berkshire, to Auguste Cheetham Hardie and Eliza Georgina Collier, Constance Collier made her stage debut at the age of three, when she played Fairy Peasblossom in A Midsummer Night's Dream. In 1893, at the age of 15, she joined the Gaiety Girls, the famous dance troupe based at the Gaiety Theatre in London. In 1905, Collier married English actor Julian Boyle (stage name Julian L'Estrange). She was known to be very tall with a big personality. On 27 December 1906, Sir Herbert Beerbohm Tree's extravagant revival of Antony and Cleopatra opened at His Majesty's Theatre, with Tree as Mark Antony and Collier as Cleopatra.

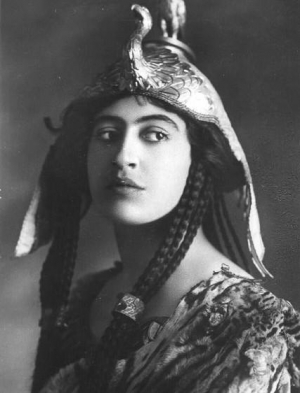
Collier in Antony and Cleopatra (1906)

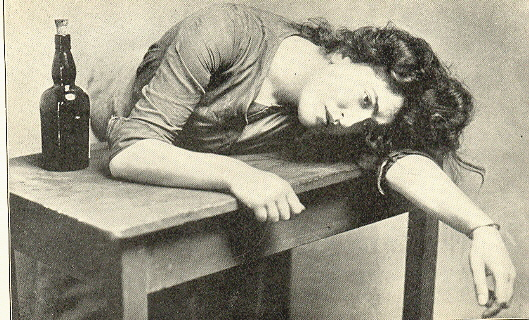
Collier as Nancy in Oliver Twist at New Amsterdam Theatre (1912)

Famed for his realistic productions, Tree and his designer, Percy Macquoid, dressed Collier in elaborate costumes. Later, Collier commented: "There is only a mention in the play of Cleopatra appearing as the goddess Isis. Tree elaborated this into a great tableau... Cleopatra, robed in silver, crowned in silver, carrying a golden scepter and the symbol of the sacred golden calf in her hand, went in procession through the streets of Alexandria, the ragged, screaming populace acclaiming the Queen, half in hate, half in superstitious fear and joy as she made her sacrilegious ascent to her high throne in the market-place."

At this point, Collier was an established actress. In January 1908, she starred with Beerbohm Tree at His Majesty's Theatre in J. Comyns Carr's new play The Mystery of Edwin Drood, based on Charles Dickens's unfinished novel of the same name. Later that year, she made the first of several tours of the United States. During the second, made with Beerbohm Tree in 1916, she made four silent films, including an uncredited appearance in D. W. Griffith's Intolerance (she can be seen being carried through the entrance to the city in the Babylonian part of the film) and as Lady Macbeth in Tree's disastrous first film interpretation of Shakespeare's Macbeth.

In 1918, her husband died from influenza while they were in New York. Following his death, she returned to England. No children were born from the marriage.

In the early 1920s, she established a close friendship with actor Ivor Novello. They both appeared in the silent film The Bohemian Girl in 1922 with Gladys Cooper and Ellen Terry. They wrote together under the pen name "James Lestrange". Around the same time, Collier became seriously ill from diabetes and treatment proved expensive. She was sent to Switzerland for treatment in 1923, then taken to a doctor in Strasbourg. She was the first patient in Europe ever to be treated with the drug insulin following its recent discovery by Frederick Banting and others in Toronto. Fully recovered, she played the Duchesse de Surennes in Somerset Maugham's comedy Our Betters, and in the following year, collaborated with Ivor Novello on a play called The Rat. She also appeared in several plays with him, including the British version of the American play, The Firebrand by Edwin Justus Mayer. In 1924, Collier introduced Novello to poet Siegfried Sassoon, with whom he had a six-month affair. While Sassoon destroyed his diary for this period, his unhappiness over their relationship became well-known, and according to his biographer Jean Moorcroft Wilson, it 'pitched him into [what he referred to as] an "unblinking hell"'.

Collier's writing career is notable for her collaboration with Deems Taylor on the libretto of the opera Peter Ibbetson, which was premiered at the Metropolitan Opera in February 1931 with mixed reviews. In 1935, upon her arrival in Hollywood, Luise Rainer hired Collier to improve Rainer's theatre acting and English, and to learn the basics of film acting.

== Hollywood ==
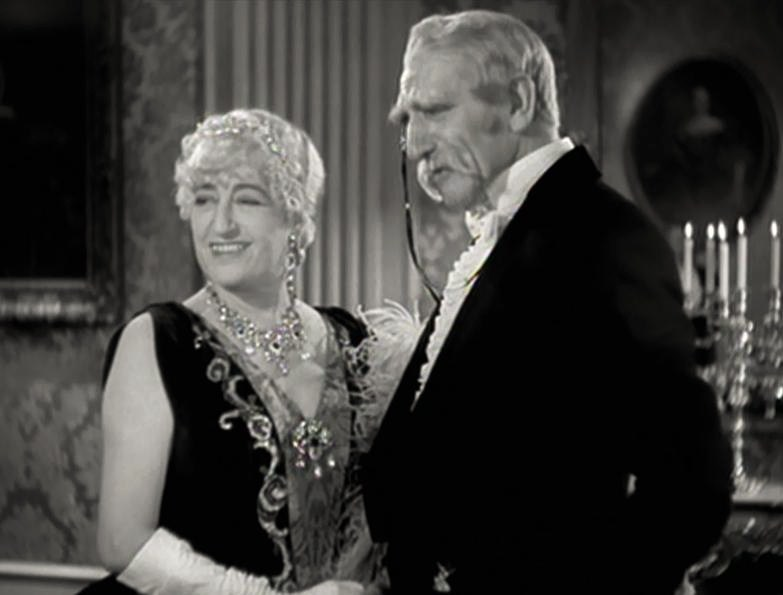
Collier with C. Aubrey Smith in Little Lord Fauntleroy (1936)

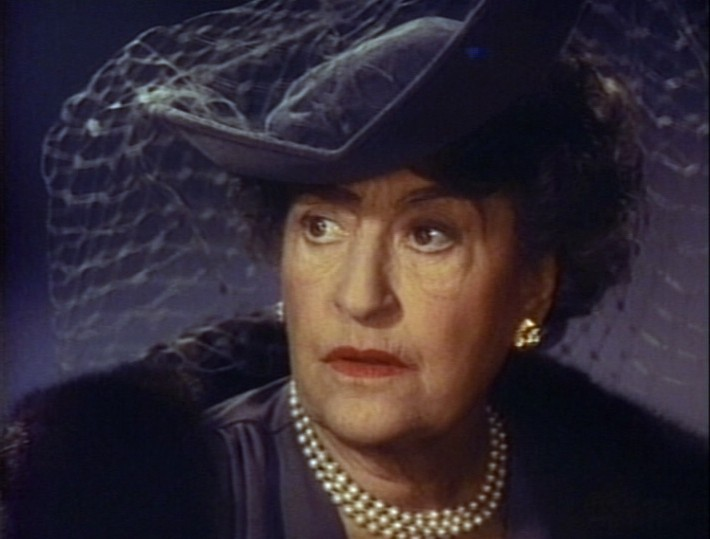
Collier in Alfred Hitchcock's Rope (1948)

In the late 1920s Collier relocated to Hollywood where she became a voice coach and teacher in diction. This was during the tumultuous changeover from silent films to sound and many silent actors with no theatre training were scrambling for lessons.

Her most famous pupil was arguably Colleen Moore, which was documented in an interview by film historian Kevin Brownlow for the series Hollywood (1980) about the silent film era. Collier nevertheless maintained ties to Broadway and appeared in several plays in the 1930s. In 1932 Collier starred as Carlotta Vance in the original production of George S. Kaufman and Edna Ferber's comedy Dinner at Eight. The role was played in the 1933 film version by Marie Dressler.

She appeared in the films Stage Door (1937), Mitchell Leisen's Kitty (1945, a comedic performance as Lady Susan, the drunken aunt of Ray Milland), Perils of Pauline with Betty Hutton, Alfred Hitchcock's Rope (1948) and Otto Preminger's Whirlpool (1949).

During the making of the film version of Stage Door, she became great friends with Katharine Hepburn, a friendship that lasted the rest of Collier's life.

Collier was presented with the American Shakespeare Festival Theatre Award for distinguished service in training and guiding actors in Shakespearean roles. Collier was a drama coach for many famous actors, including Audrey Hepburn, Vivien Leigh and Marilyn Monroe. She coached Katharine Hepburn during Hepburn's world tour performing Shakespeare in the 1950s. Upon Collier's death in 1955, Hepburn "inherited" Collier's secretary Phyllis Wilbourn, who remained with Hepburn as her secretary for 40 years.

Collier has a star on the Hollywood Walk of Fame.

Collier died of a heart attack in Manhattan on 25 April 1955 at the age of 77.

== Filmography ==
Silent

Year	Title	Role	Notes
1916	The Tongues of Men	Jane Bartlett	Incomplete film
1916	The Code of Marcia Gray	Marcia Gray	
1916	Macbeth	Lady Macbeth	Lost film
1916	Intolerance	Extra	Uncredited
1919	The Impossible Woman	Mme. Kraska	
1920	Bleak House	Lady Dedlock	
1922	The Bohemian Girl	Queen	Incomplete film

Sound

Year	Title	Role	Notes
1935	Shadow of Doubt	Aunt Melissa Pilson	
1935	Anna Karenina	Countess Lidia	Uncredited
1935	Professional Soldier	Lady Augusta	
1936	Little Lord Fauntleroy	Lady Lorridaile	
1936	Girls' Dormitory	Professor Augusta Wimmer	
1937	Thunder in the City	The Duchess	
1937	Wee Willie Winkie	Mrs. Allardyce	
1937	Clothes and the Woman	Eugenia	
1937	Stage Door	Miss Luther	
1937	A Damsel in Distress	Lady Caroline	
1939	Zaza	Nathalie	
1940	Half a Sinner	Mrs. Jefferson Breckenbridge	
1940	Susan and God	Lady Wigstaff	
1945	Kitty	Lady Susan Dowitt	
1946	The Dark Corner	Mrs. Kingsley	
1946	Monsieur Beaucaire	The Queen of France	
1947	The Perils of Pauline	Julia Gibbs	
1947	An Ideal Husband	Lady Markby	
1948	Rope	Mrs. Anita Atwater	
1948	The Girl from Manhattan	Mrs. Brooke	
1950	Whirlpool	Tina Cosgrove	Final film role
