= Burde =

Burde or Bürde is a surname. Notable people with the surname include:

- Dana Burde, American political scientist
- Jeanette Antonie Bürde (1799–1875), Austrian pianist, singer, composer and teacher
- Jenny Bürde-Ney (1824–1886), German operatic soprano
- Marie Burde (1892–1963), German rag-and-bone woman who hid Jews from the Nazis
- Paul Bürde (1819 or 1830 – 1874), German painter and illustrator
- Richard John Burde (1871–1954), Canadian politician
- Samuel Gottlieb Bürde (1753–1831), German poet
