= The White Roses of Ravensberg =

The White Roses of Ravensberg (German: Die weißen Rosen von Ravensberg) may refer to:

- The White Roses of Ravensberg (novel), an 1896 novel by Eufemia von Adlersfeld-Ballestrem
- The White Roses of Ravensberg (1919 film), a silent film adaptation directed by Nils Olaf Chrisander
- The White Roses of Ravensberg (1929 film), a silent film adaptation directed by Rudolf Meinert
