= Paul Bürde =

German painter and illustrator

Paul Eduard Maximilian Bürde (1819 or 28 November 1830; – 23 May 1874) was a German painter and illustrator.

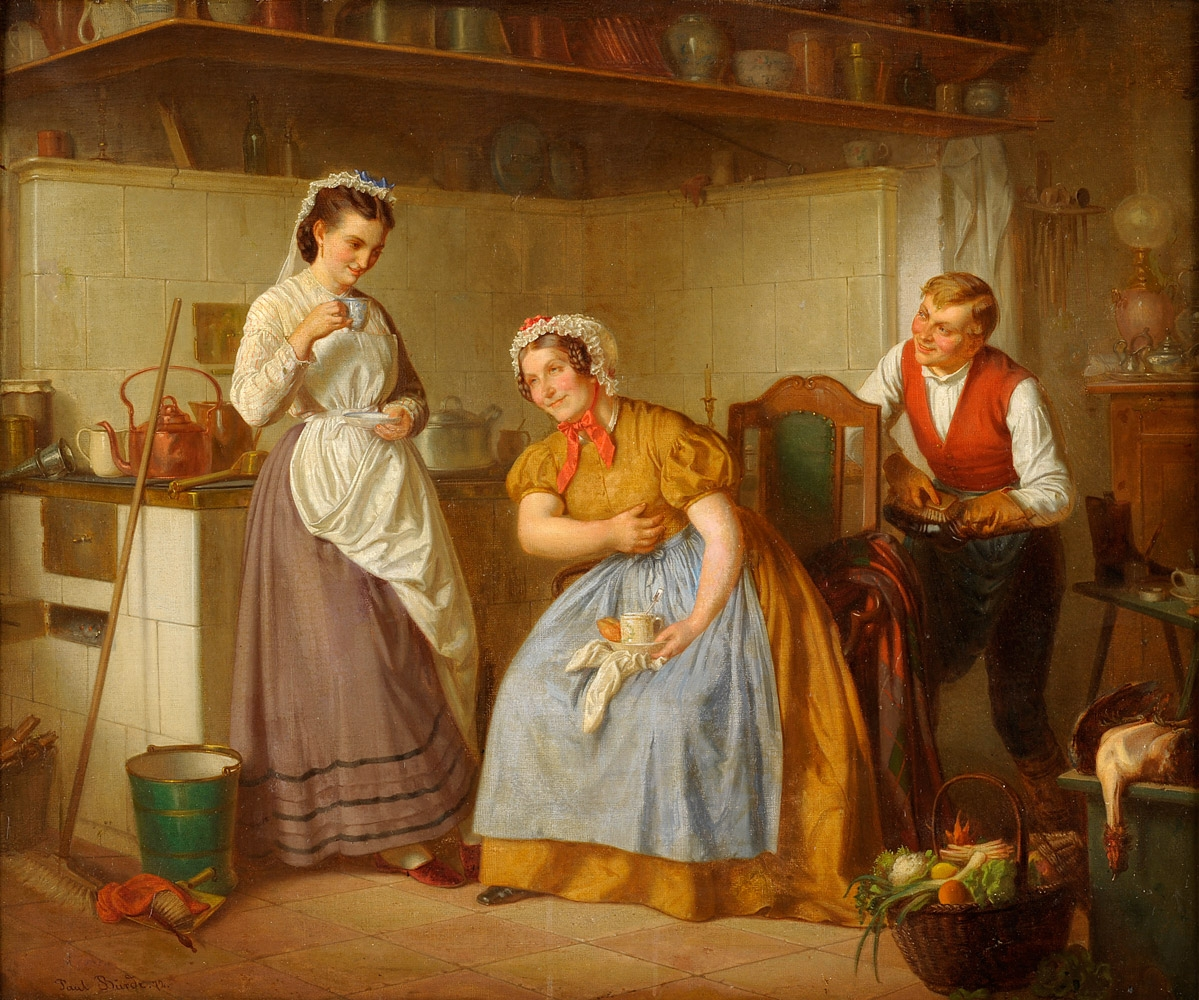
Eine lustige Geschichte, Genre painting of the servant milieu

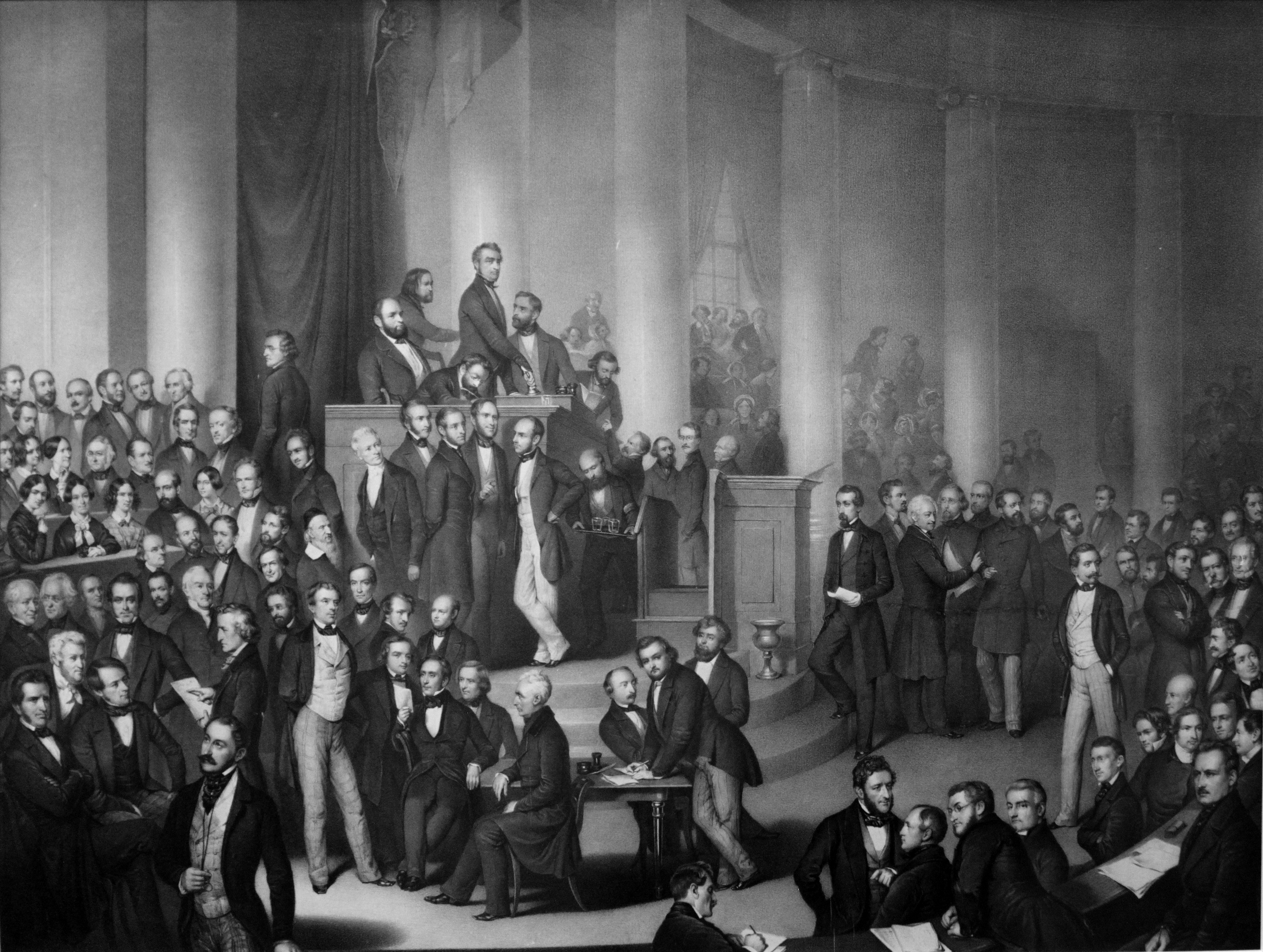
Diskussion im Frankfurt Parliament, 1848, Lithografie nach dem Gemälde von Paul Bürde

== Life ==
Born in Upper Silesia, Bürde was the fifth child of Ernst Bürde (1794–1869) and his wife Pauline, née Rambach (1798–1855). He grew up in Rosniontau. His uncle was the Berlin academy professor and animal painter Friedrich Leopold Bürde (1792–1849), husband of the singer and pianist Jeanette Milder-Bürde. A further uncle was the building councillor working for Karl Friedrich Schinkel Georg Heinrich Bürde (1796–1865), his daughter-in-law, the singer Jenny Bürde-Ney (1824–1886), portrayed by Paul Bürde. Bürde's grandfather was the poet and court councillor Samuel Gottlieb Bürde (1753–1831). On 28 November 1856 he married his cousin Katarina (1837–1917), the daughter of his uncle Georg Heinrich.

At the Prussian Academy of Arts in Berlin he made a portrait of his teacher Eduard Daege. Well known is his picture Diskussion im Frankfurt Parliament, in which Bürde as an eyewitness of the parliamentary sessions portrayed many important politicians of the German revolutions of 1848-1849. Another well-known picture is Homage to Kaiser Wilhelm I. (1871), by which William I, German Emperor was put in a row with Martin Luther, Frederick the Great and Field Marshal Blücher because of the foundation of the German Empire and thus painterly reproduced the Borussian historiography of Heinrich von Treitschke. (German Historical Institute Washington DC), retrieved 14 September 2020. In Berlin, Bürde was active until his death as genre painting and portrait painter of Berlin personalities as well as illustrator of the magazine Die Gartenlaube. The painter Ludwig Pietsch also highlighted Bürde as a "painter of watercolour pictures of official events at the royal court and in the royal family".

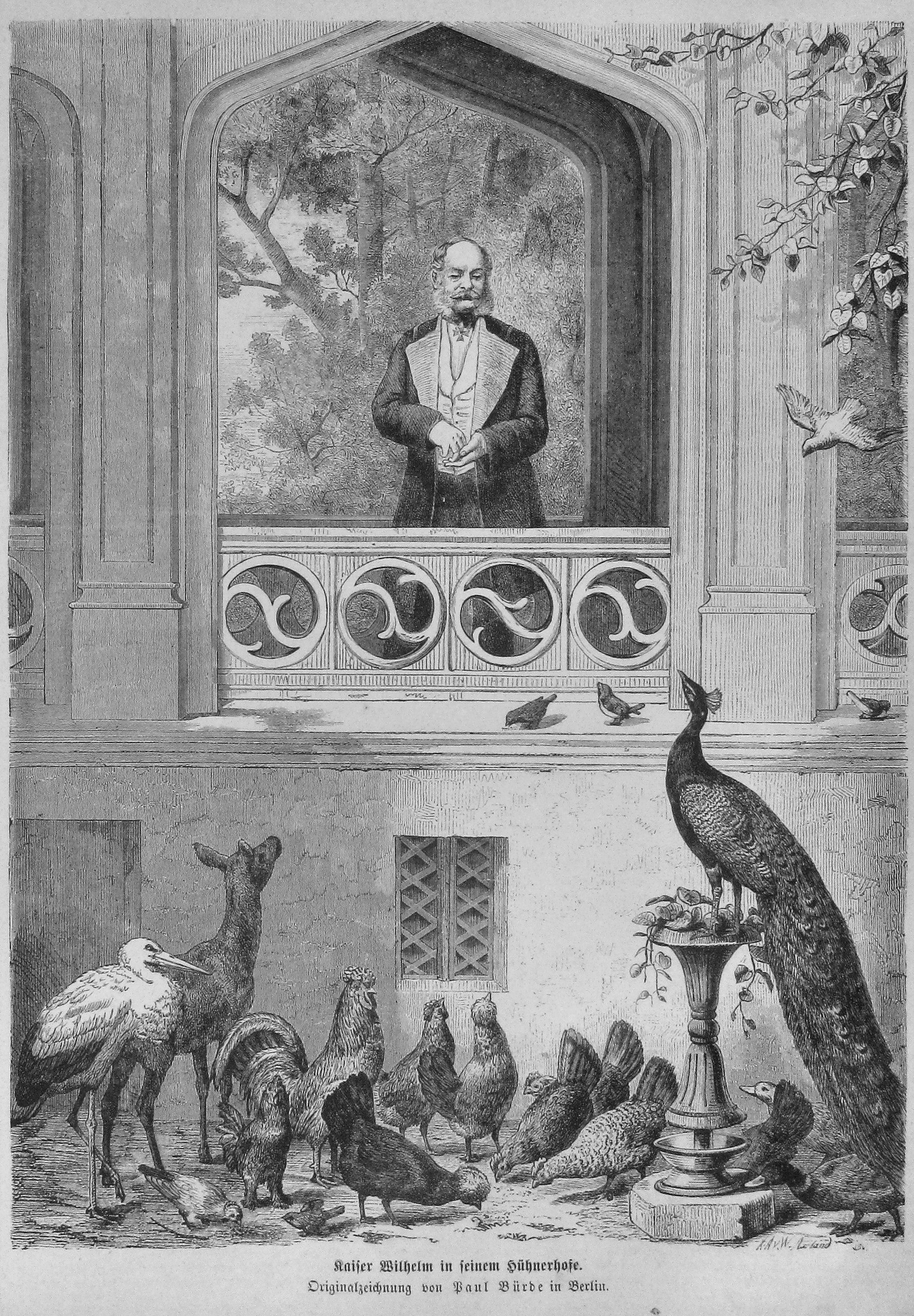
Kaiser Wilhelm in seinem Hühnerhause (in Schloss Babelsberg), Illustration in Die Gartenlaube, 1873
