= Cronjager =

Cronjager is a surname, notable people with this name include:

- Edward Cronjager (1904–1960), American cinematographer
- Henry Cronjager (1877–1967), American cinematographer, father of Edward
