= Henry Cronjager Jr. =

American cinematographer

Henry Cronjager Jr
- Born: April 2, 1906
- Died: May 29, 1991 (aged 85); Los Angeles, California, United States
- Occupations: Film and television cinematographer
- Years active: 1934–1991

Henry Cronjager Jr (1906–1991) was an American cinematographer who worked both in the film and television industries from the 1930s until the 1970s. He was the son of Henry Cronjager, brother to Edward Cronjager, and father to William Cronjager, all also cinematographers. Due to the similarity in names with his father, there is some confusion as to exactly when the senior Cronjager's career ended, and the younger one's began. Both were active during the 1930s, however the American Film Institute's entry for Henry Cronjager conflates the careers of the two cinematographers, while Imdb.com as the senior's career ending in 1933. The first reliable source wherein it shows that Cronjager Jr. was the cameraman and not his father is a Walter Winchell column from February 26, 1937, which shows that Cronjager Jr. was a cameraman on the film Wake Up and Live, for which his brother Edward was the cinematographer.

He worked as cameraman for films in the 1930s, 40s and into the 50s, working on such films as 1938's Rebecca of Sunnybrook Farm, 1941s Western Union, 1945's Nob Hill, 1948's An Innocent Affair, and 1950's The Capture. By the late 1950s he was being credited as the cinematographer on productions, and began to transition into television, although he did occasionally still work on films such as Squad Car and Hands of a Stranger. Some of his television credits include The Life and Legend of Wyatt Earp, The Jack Benny Program, The Dick Van Dyke Show, The Joey Bishop Show, The Mothers-in-Law, and The Guns of Will Sonnett. His last credit was as the Director of Photography in 1972–73 on The Paul Lynde Show.
