= If the Gods Laugh =

1925 novel by Rosita Forbes

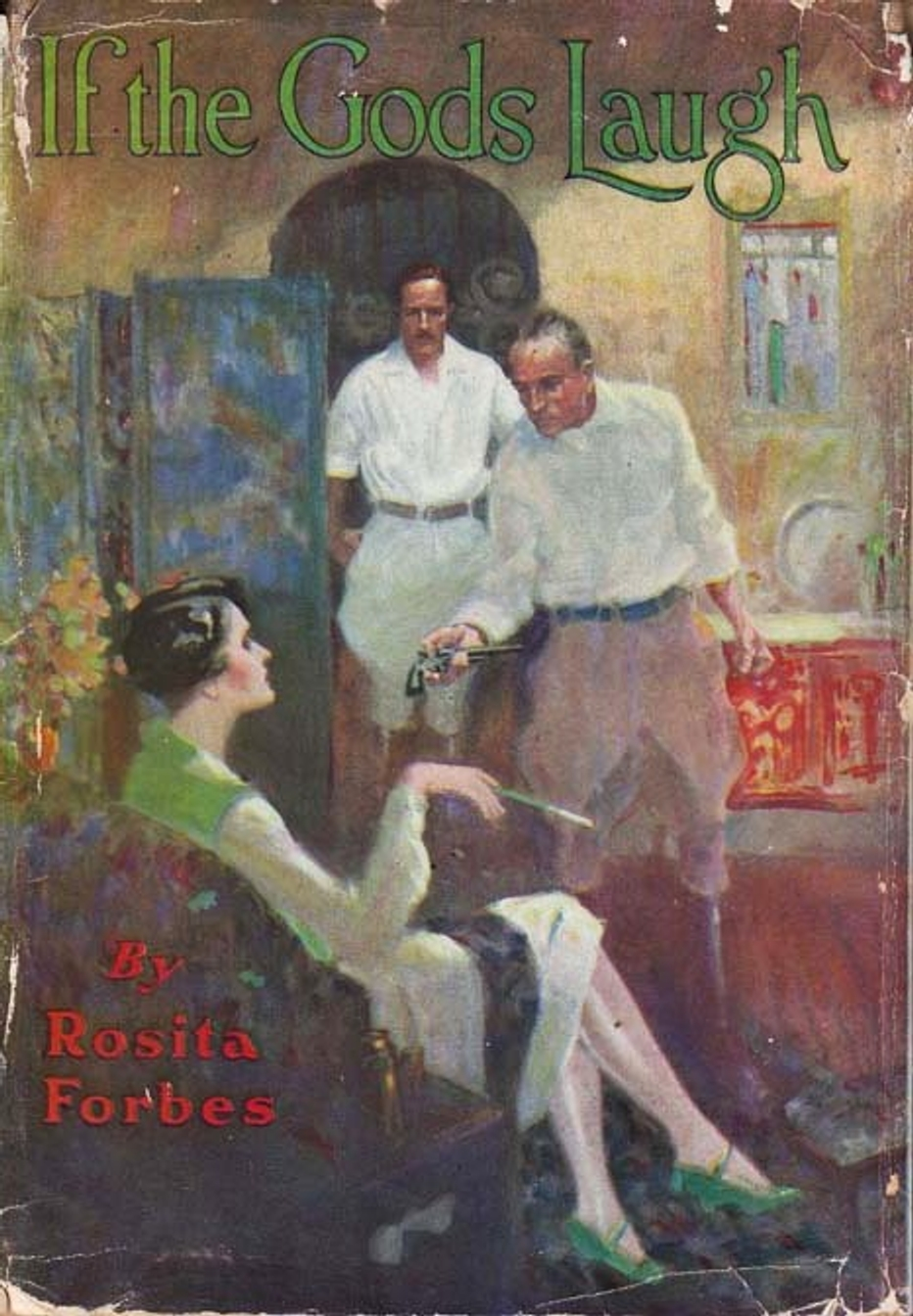
- First US edition
- Author: Rosita Forbes
- Language: English
- Genre: Romance
- Publisher: Thornton Butterworth (UK); Macaulay (US)
- Publication date: 1925
- Publication place: United Kingdom
- Media type: Print

If the Gods Laugh is a 1925 romantic adventure novel by the British writer and explorer Rosita Forbes. It is set against the backdrop of the Italian colonization of Libya.

== Film adaptation ==
In 1927 it was adapted into the American silent film Fighting Love directed by Nils Olaf Chrisander and starring Jetta Goudal, Victor Varconi and Henry B. Walthall.

== Bibliography ==
- Goble, Alan. The Complete Index to Literary Sources in Film. Walter de Gruyter, 1999.
- Liggins, Emma & Nolan, Elizabeth. Women's Writing of the First World War. Routledge, 2019.
- Munden, Kenneth White. The American Film Institute Catalog of Motion Pictures Produced in the United States, Part 1. University of California Press, 1997.
- Teo, Hsu-Ming. Desert Passions: Orientalism and Romance Novels. University of Texas Press, 2012.
- Watson, George & Willison, Ian R. The New Cambridge Bibliography of English Literature, Volume 4. CUP, 1972.
