= Raffensperger =

Raffensperger is a German-language surname. Notable people with this surname include:

- Brad Raffensperger (born 1955), American politician who has served as Secretary of State of Georgia since 2019.
- Carolyn Raffensperger, American environmental lawyer
- Leonard Raffensperger (1903–1974), American football and basketball player and coach

== See also ==
- Ravensberg (disambiguation)
- Ravensbrück
- Ravensburger
