= The White Sheik (1928 film) =

1928 film

- German poster
- Directed by: Harley Knoles
- Written by: Violet E. Powell; Mary Murillo
- Based on: King's Mate by Rosita Forbes
- Starring: Lillian Hall-Davis; Warwick Ward; Jameson Thomas; Julie Suedo
- Cinematography: René Guissart
- Production company: British International Pictures
- Distributed by: Wardour Films
- Release date: 17 January 1928
- Running time: 95 minutes
- Country: United Kingdom
- Languages: Silent; English intertitles

The White Sheik, also known as King's Mate, is a 1928 British silent adventure film directed by Harley Knoles and starring Lillian Hall-Davis, Jameson Thomas and Warwick Ward. It was based on the novel King's Mate by Rosita Forbes.

== Plot ==
While spending the winter in the Moroccan city of Fez young Englishwoman Rosemary encounters a vile man Martengo who tries to force his attentions on her. Escaping to the desert she becomes lost and is rescued by a mysterious Englishman known as the White Sheik.

== Cast ==
- Lillian Hall-Davis as Rosemary Tregarthen
- Jameson Thomas as Westwyn
- Warwick Ward as Martengo
- Clifford McLaglen as Manheebe
- Gibb McLaughlin as Jock
- Forrester Harvey as Pat
- Julie Suedo as Zarita

== Release ==
For its December 1929 New York City premiere at the Little Carnegie Playhouse it was accompanied by the Hal Roach Studios comedy Feed ’em and Weep and the Universum Film AG documentary short Strange Prayers.

== Reception ==
The New York Times reviewer Mordaunt Hall called the film "amateurish" and "boring", with characters he thought "as silly a lot as have ever darted to and fro on the screen."
