= Poor Sinner =

1923 film

- Kortner and Karenne
- Directed by: Pier Antonio Gariazzo
- Written by: Pier Antonio Gariazzo
- Produced by: Karl Julius Fritzsche
- Starring: Alfred Abel; Diana Karenne; Fritz Kortner
- Production company: Transozean Film
- Release date: 22 June 1923
- Country: Germany
- Languages: Silent; German intertitles

Poor Sinner (German: Arme Sünderin) is a 1923 German silent drama film directed by Pier Antonio Gariazzo and starring Alfred Abel, Diana Karenne and Fritz Kortner.

== Cast ==
- Alfred Abel
- Diana Karenne as Nell
- Fritz Kortner as Canary
- Waldemar Potier

== Bibliography ==
- Bock, Hans-Michael & Bergfelder, Tim. The Concise CineGraph. Encyclopedia of German Cinema. Berghahn Books, 2009.
