= The Rejuvenation of Aunt Mary =

1927 film by Erle C. Kenton

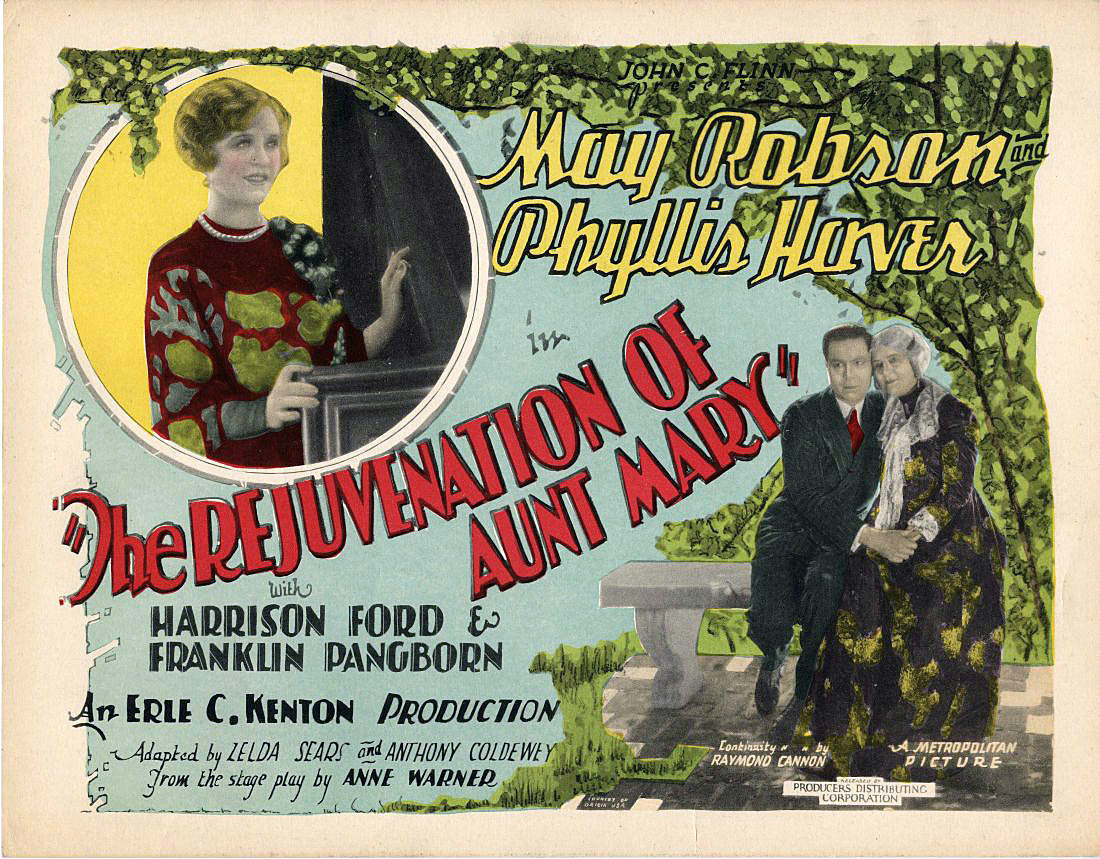
- Lobby card
- Directed by: Erle C. Kenton; Edmond F. Bernoudy (2nd Unit)
- Written by: Anne Warner (play); Zelda Sears; Anthony Coldeway (adaptation); Raymond Cannon (scenario)
- Produced by: John C. Flinn
- Starring: May Robson; Phyllis Haver; Harrison Ford
- Cinematography: Barney McGill
- Distributed by: Producers Distributing Corporation
- Release date: August 8, 1927
- Running time: 60 minutes
- Country: United States
- Language: Silent (English intertitles)

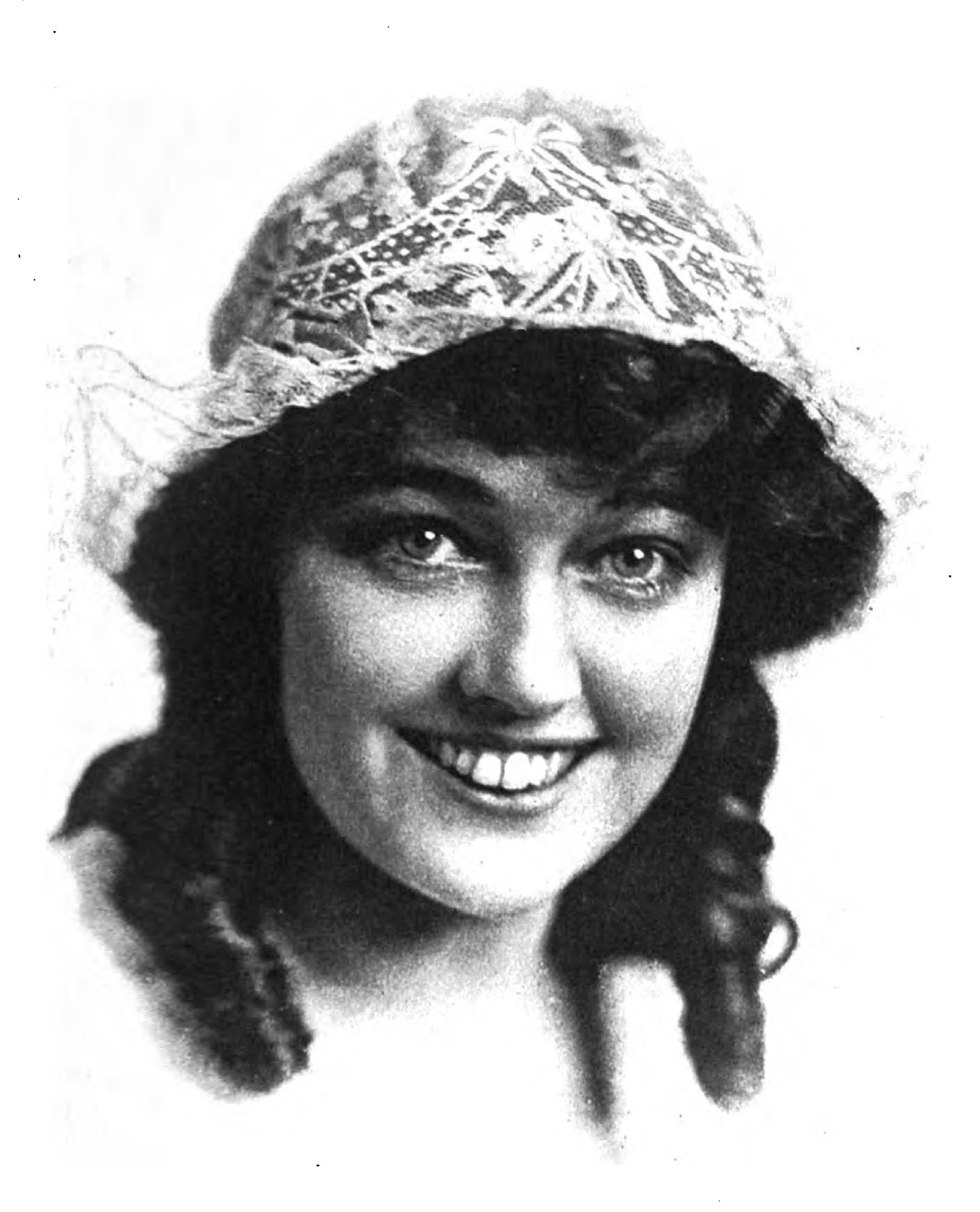
Cast member Betty Brown.

The Rejuvenation of Aunt Mary is a lost 1927 American silent comedy film starring veteran actress May Robson and released by Cecil B. DeMille's Producers Distributing Corporation (PDC).

Robson first appeared in the Broadway play version of this story in 1907 when she was 49. In the film she returns to enact the same part 20 years later at the age of 69. A previous 1914 film version of the play had been produced minus May Robson.

== Cast ==
- May Robson as Aunt Mary Watkins
- Harrison Ford as Jack Watkins
- Phyllis Haver as Martha Rankin
- Franklin Pangborn as Melville
- Robert Edeson as Judge Hopper
- Arthur Hoyt as Gus Watkins
- Betty Brown as Alma

== See also ==
- The Rejuvenation of Aunt Mary (1914)
