= Das Phantom der Oper =

1916 film

- Based on: The Phantom of the Opera by Gaston Leroux
- Starring: Nils Olaf Chrisander
- Release date: 1916
- Running time: (1,381 meters)
- Country: German Empire
- Language: Silent with German intertitles

Das Phantom der Oper is a 1916 silent film. Also known as Das Gespenst im Opernhaus ('The Ghost in the Opera House'), it is notable for being the first film adaptation of the 1910 novel The Phantom of the Opera by Gaston Leroux.

The film is now believed to be a lost film. No copies, photographs or even a poster of the film remain. Text advertisements and a summary exist. All that is known from these advertisements is that it was made in Germany in autumn 1915, directed by Ernst Matray, starring Nils Olaf Chrisander as the Phantom and Aud Egede-Nissen as Christine. Raoul was played by director Ernst Matray.

== Production background ==
The film Das Phantom der Oper was shot in autumn 1915 in Germany and was released in 1916.

The script was written by Greta Schröder. The director, Ernst Matray, became her husband. The film lasted 76 minutes (16 frames per second, 5 rolls of film, the total length of the film was 1381 meters).

== Cast ==
- Nils Olaf Chrisander as Erik
- Aud Egede-Nissen as Christine Daaé
- Ernst Matray as Raoul

== See also ==
- List of lost films
