= The White Roses of Ravensberg (1919 film) =

1919 film by Nils Olaf Chrisander

- Directed by: Nils Olaf Chrisander
- Written by: Eufemia von Adlersfeld-Ballestrem (novel); Nils Olaf Chrisander; Richard Kühle
- Starring: Nils Olaf Chrisander; Hans Adalbert Schlettow
- Cinematography: Karl Hasselmann
- Production company: Deutsche Bioscop
- Release date: December 1919
- Running time: 47 minutes
- Country: Germany
- Languages: Silent; German intertitles

The White Roses of Ravensberg (German: Die weißen Rosen von Ravensberg) is a 1919 German silent drama film directed by and starring Nils Olaf Chrisander. It is based on the 1896 novel by Eufemia von Adlersfeld-Ballestrem which was later adapted into a 1929 film of the same title.

The film's sets were designed by the art director Gustav A. Knauer. It was shot at the Babelsberg Studios and on location around Potsdam.

== Cast ==
- Nils Olaf Chrisander as Fürst Marcel Hochwald
- Hans Adalbert Schlettow as Graf Ludwig Erlenstein
- Uschi Elleot as Iris von Ravensberg
- Frau Marion as Mutter Marie von Ravensberg
- Erna Thiele as Tochter Sigrid Erlenstein
- Franz Baumann
- Maud Marion
- Robert Scholz
- Ilse Wilke

== Bibliography ==
- Wolfgang Jacobsen. Babelsberg: das Filmstudio. Argon, 1994.
