= Fighting Love =

1927 film by Nils Olaf Chrisander

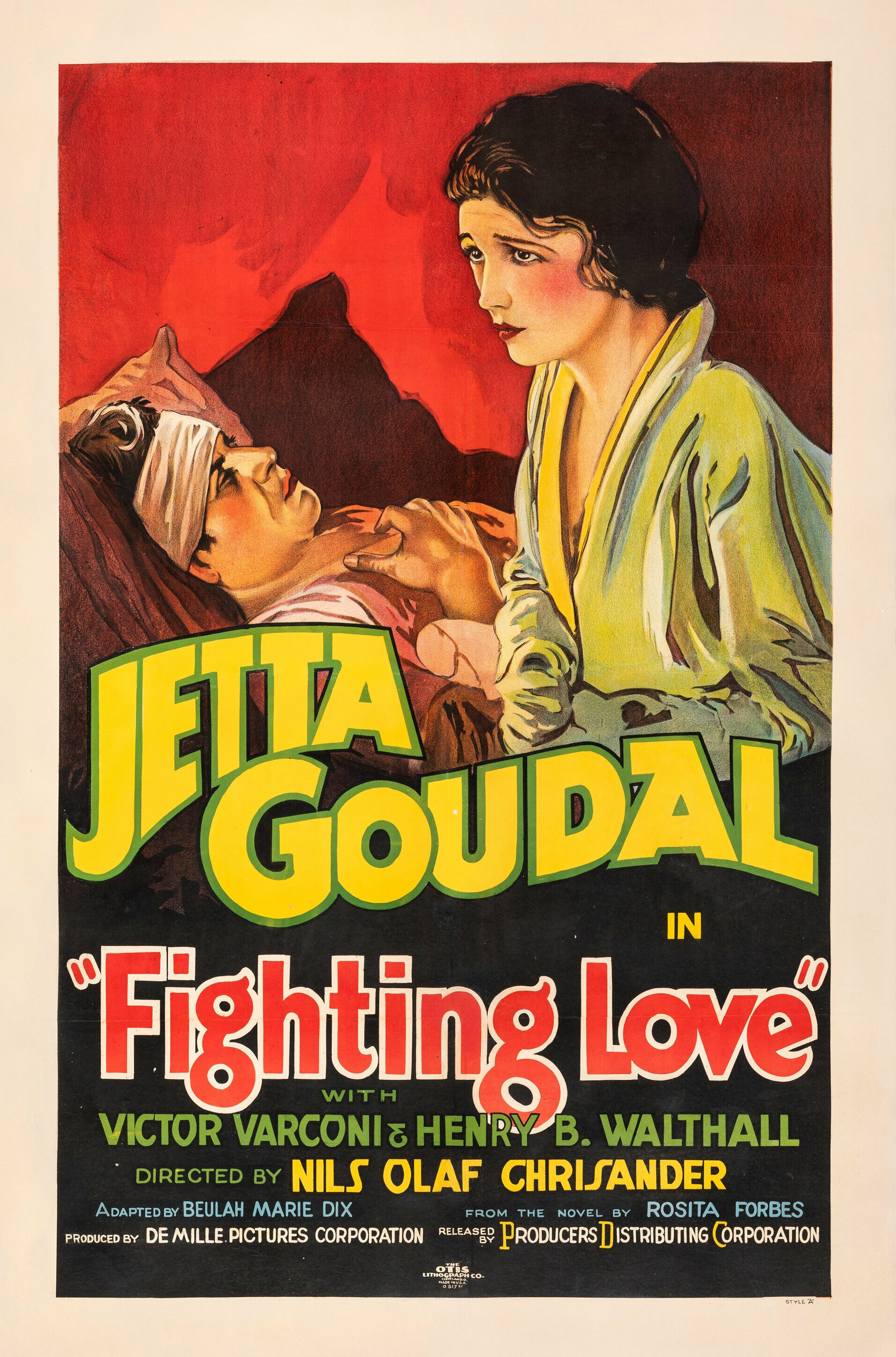
- Theatrical Release Poster
- Directed by: Nils Olaf Chrisander
- Written by: Beulah Marie Dix
- Based on: If the Gods Laugh by Rosita Forbes
- Produced by: Cecil B. DeMille; Bertram Millhauser
- Starring: Jetta Goudal; Victor Varconi; Henry B. Walthall
- Cinematography: Henry Cronjager
- Edited by: Claude Berkeley
- Production company: DeMille Pictures Corporation
- Distributed by: Producers Distributing Corporation; National Film (Germany)
- Release date: February 14, 1927
- Running time: 70 minutes
- Country: United States
- Languages: Silent; English intertitles

Fighting Love is a 1927 American silent drama film directed by Nils Olaf Chrisander and starring Jetta Goudal, Victor Varconi and Henry B. Walthall. The film survives complete. It is based on the 1925 novel If the Gods Laugh by the British writer and explorer Rosita Forbes. The film's sets were designed by the art director Anton Grot.

== Synopsis ==
After discovering her fiancée kissing another woman, Vittoria marries a family friend in a marriage of convenience and accompanies him to the Italian colony of Libya. While there she encounters a handsome young man and falls in love with him. Wrongly believing her husband to have been killed in a Bedouin attack, the two undergo an Arab wedding ceremony with him. When she discovers the truth she returns to her husband.

== Cast ==
- Jetta Goudal as Donna Vittoria
- Victor Varconi as Gabriel Amari
- Henry B. Walthall as Filipo Navarro
- Louis Natheaux as Dario Niccolini
- Josephine Crowell as Princess Torini
- Eulalie Jensen as Zillah

== Reception ==
The Pittsburgh Press noted that the film was "more interesting than the story... from which it was adapted." The Ottawa Citizen stated that the film "teems with romance, color, action and drama with a climax as startling as it is unexpected."

== Bibliography ==
- Goble, Alan. The Complete Index to Literary Sources in Film. Walter de Gruyter, 1999.
