= The Flight of the Grey Wolf =

1976 television film

- Genre: Adventure; Drama; Family
- Screenplay by: Calvin Clements Jr.; Mel Ellis
- Directed by: Frank Zuniga
- Starring: Jeff East; Bill Williams; Barbara Hale; William Bryant
- Music by: Robert F. Brunner
- Country of origin: United States
- Original language: English

Production
- Producer: Roy E. Disney
- Production locations: Lassen Volcanic National Park, California
- Cinematography: William Cronjager
- Editor: Corky Ehlers
- Running time: 100 minutes
- Production company: Walt Disney Productions

Original release
- Network: NBC
- Release: May 14, 1976

The Flight of the Grey Wolf was a 1976 television film produced by Walt Disney Productions, and broadcast in two parts on The Wonderful World of Disney, the first part airing on May 14, 1976. The film was directed by Frank Zuniga, and stars Jeff East, Bill Williams, Barbara Hale, and William Bryant. It was based on the 1970 book "Flight of the White Wolf" by Mel Ellis.

In July 1975 Disney announced that the film would be part of its 1975-1976 line-up on The Wonderful World of Disney. It was to be one of two longer films which were to be broken down into two parts and be shown on back-to-back Sundays, the other being The Boy Who Talked to Badgers. The first part of the film aired on Sunday, March 14, 1976, opposite The Wizard of Oz, which was airing on CBS. The second part aired the following Sunday, March 21.

== Plot ==
As Russ is attacked by a dog, his pet wolf, Grey comes to his defense and kills the dog. Frightened, Grey runs away, and in the process frightens a rancher's daughter. When the town is roused to take action against Grey, Russ takes the wolf into the forest and realizes that he will never be able to bring Grey back to his former home, but he also understands he cannot simply release the wolf into the wild, so he starts trying to re-establishing the wolf's natural instincts.

== Cast ==
- Jeff East as Russ Hanson
- Bill Williams as The Sheriff
- Barbara Hale as Mrs. Hanson
- William Bryant as Mr. Hanson
- Eric Server as the Deputy
- Judson Pratt as Mr. Pomeroy
- Sam Edwards as Amsel
- Owen Bush as Tom
- Joe Haworth as Josh
- Jesse Martin as Hunter
