= William Cronjager =

American cinematographer

- Born: March 28, 1930; Queens, New York
- Died: May 25, 1995 (aged 65); Lake Havasu City, Arizona, United States
- Occupation: Cinematographer
- Years active: 1957-1988

William Cronjager was an American cinematographer who worked primarily in the television medium. The son, nephew and grandson of famous cinematographers, he began his career as an assistant cameraman, assisting on the 1957 film Oh, Men! Oh, Women!. In the 1960s he moved to the small screen, where he did the bulk of his work over the next two decades, beginning as the director of photography (DP) for the final three seasons (1967-1969) of the television melodrama, Peyton Place. While working as the DP for the first two seasons of the hit television drama Hill Street Blues, he won an Emmy for the premiere episode, "Hill Street Station".

== Early life ==
Cronjager was born on March 28, 1930, in Queens, New York. He came from a long line of famous cinematographers: His father was Henry Cronjager Jr, who like his son worked primarily in the television industry; his uncle was the 7-time Oscar-nominated Edward Cronjager; his great-uncle was Jules Cronjager, who was the cinematographer on over 100 films from the mid-1910s through the early 1930s; and his grandfather was Henry Cronjager, a pioneering cinematographer who was known for his use of shadows, which would become a staple of the later German expressionist film movement.

== Career ==
Cronjager began working in film in the late 1950s. Working as an assistant cameraman or 2nd assistant cameraman, he began on the 1957 comedy, Oh, Men! Oh, Women!. He also worked on the notable films, South Pacific (1958), The Hustler (1961), and Rio Conchos (1964). Beginning with taking over the photography on Peyton Place in 1967, he would work consistently in television through his retirement in 1988. Following Peyton Place, he would move to Bracken's World in 1969, staying with that series until it ended in 1970.

During the 1970s and 1980s, Cronjager was the original director of photography on the television series Columbo and Hart to Hart. He also continued to work on the big screen during this decade. In 1974 he was the cinematographer on the Charles Martin low-budget comedy, How to Seduce a Woman. His only other, and final, work on the big screen was on another low budget picture, 1976's Vigilante Force. During the 1970s, he worked on several notable television series. He took over the camera helm for the second series of the western, Alias Smith and Jones in 1971, and was frequent DP on Columbo.

In 1980, Cronjager was selected as the director of photography for the new police drama, Hill Street Blues. For the initial episode, titled "Hill Street Station", Cronjager chose to shoot approximately 90% of the show utilizing hand-held cameras. His work garnered him a Primetime Emmy, for Outstanding Cinematography in a Series.

Even though Cronjager had no involvement in the original Cannon television series from 1971 to 1976, when the series was resurrected in 1980 as a television film, the film's director, Corey Allen, selected Cronjager to shoot the picture. The TV film was titled The Return of Frank Cannon, and Allen was impressed with Cronjager's work on Hill Street Blues. For one scene in the film, it was necessary to light a six-acre set for a nighttime shoot. It took Cronjager and his crew seven and a half hours setting up the scene's lighting, which took up 6000 feet of cable and used about 3,000 amps. In the final product, the scene took up approximately 5 seconds of air time.

Cronjager's last project was the 1988 television film, Broken Angel (tv film), starring William Shatner and Susan Blakely.

=== Filmography ===
Year	Title	Medium	Position	Notes
1957	Oh, Men! Oh, Women!	Film	Assistant cameraman	
1957	Kiss Them for Me	Film	Assistant cameraman	
1958	South Pacific	Film	2nd Assistant cameraman	
1959	The Remarkable Mr. Pennypacker	Film	Assistant cameraman	
1961	The Hustler	Film	Assistant cameraman	
1964	Rio Conchos	Film	2nd Assistant cameraman	
1967–69	Peyton Place	TV	Director of Photography	3 seasons, 132 episodes
1969–70	Bracken's World	TV	Director of Photography	2 seasons, 27 episodes
1971	The Partners	TV	Director of Photography	1 episodes
1971	Bayou Boy	Film	Director of Photography	
1971–72	Alias Smith and Jones	TV	Director of Photography	17 episodes
1972	Run, Cougar, Run	Film	Director of Photography	
1972–73	McCloud	TV	Director of Photography	5 episodes
1973–76	Columbo	TV	Director of Photography	10 episodes
1974	How to Seduce a Woman	Film	Director of Photography	
1975	Baretta	TV	Director of Photography	2 episodes
1976	Dynasty	TV film	Director of Photography	
1976	The Flight of the Grey Wolf	TV film	Director of Photography	
1976	Vigilante Force	Film	Director of Photography	
1977	Man from Atlantis	TV	Director of Photography	1 episode - pilot
1977	Westside Medical	TV	Director of Photography	1 episode
1977	Delta County, U.S.A.	TV film	Director of Photography	
1977	Killer on Board	TV film	Director of Photography	
1978	Deadman's Curve	TV film	Director of Photography	
1978	Child of Glass	TV film	Director of Photography	
1978	Secrets of Three Hungry Wives	TV film	Director of Photography	
1979	Turnabout	TV	Director of Photography	1 episode - pilot
1979	B. J. and the Bear	TV	Director of Photography	1 episode
1979	The Seeding of Sarah Burns	TV film	Director of Photography	
1979	The Misadventures of Sheriff Lobo	TV	Director of Photography	1 episode
1979–80	The Dukes of Hazzard	TV	Director of Photography	4 episode
1980	The Return of Frank Cannon	TV film	Director of Photography	
1980–82	Hill Street Blues	TV	Director of Photography	27 episodes
1980	The Secret War of Jackie's Girls	TV film	Director of Photography	
1981	Born to Be Sold	TV film	Director of Photography	
1983	Bring 'Em Back Alive	TV	Director of Photography	4 episodes
1983–84	Hart to Hart	TV	Director of Photography	10 episodes
1984	Partners in Crime	TV	Director of Photography	10 episodes
1985	Miami Vice	TV	Director of Photography	1 episode
1985	J.O.E. and the Colonel	TV film	Director of Photography	
1988	Alone in the Neon Jungle	TV film	Director of Photography	
1988	Broken Angel	TV film	Director of Photography	
