= Henry Cronjager =

American cinematographer

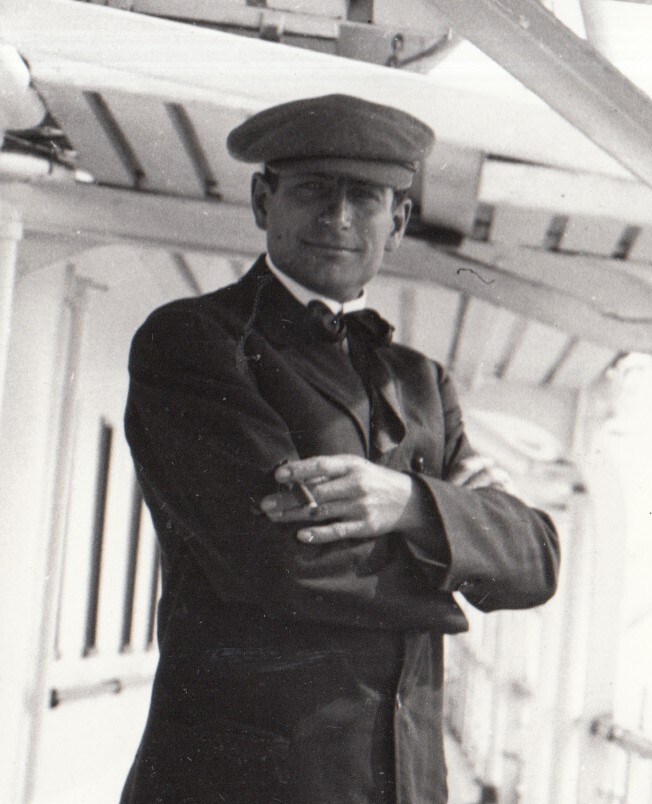
- Cronjager on a boat to Cuba, 1910
- Born: February 15, 1877; Germany
- Died: August 1, 1967 (aged 90); Los Angeles, California, United States
- Occupation: Cinematographer
- Years active: 1909–1934

Henry Cronjager (February 15, 1877 – August 1, 1967) was a cinematographer during the early days of silent film, and was active during the beginning of the sound film era.

== Biography ==
Born in Germany on February 15, 1877, Cronjager and his brother Jules moved to the United States. In 1893 he became a photographer, initially working in portrait studios, before ending up in the art department of the New York Edison Co. Cronjager eventually moved into cinematography, working for companies such as Edison Studios, the Biograph Company, and Fox Film Corporation, being the first cameraman engaged by both of those studios. He was known for his use of shadows, which would become a staple of the later German expressionist film movement.

His two sons, Henry Cronjager Jr. and Edward Cronjager were also cinematographers, with Edward being nominated for seven Oscars. His grandson, William Cronjager (through Henry Jr.), was an Emmy Award-winning cinematographer. His more notable silent films include 1917's Crime and Punishment, the Mary Pickford 1919 picture, Daddy Long Legs, and the 1921 film, Tol'able David. In 1920 he was one of the first cameramen to use the "double exposure" method to film an actor on screen in two different roles at the same time, in the 1920 David O. Selznick film The Wonderful Chance. His career went into decline with the advent of talking pictures, although he was one of several cameraman to film Howard Hughes' 1930 film, Hell's Angels. In an ironic twist, when he was demoted from cinematographer to cameraman on the 1934 film Kentucky Kernels, he would retire. His son Edward had been selected as the director of photography for that film.

== Filmography ==
(Per AFI database)

- Comedy and Tragedy (1909)
- The Fox Hunt (1909)
- A Central American Romance (1910)
- The Heart of a Rose (1910)
- The Judgment of the Mighty Deep (1910)
- More Than His Duty (1910)
- Pardners (1910)
- The Princess and the Peasant (1910)
- A Trip over the Rocky and Selkirk Mountains in Canada (1910)
- An Unselfish Love (1910)
- The Battle of Trafalgar (1911)
- Lord Chumley (1914)
- The Rejuvenation of Aunt Mary (1914)
- The Deemster (1917)
- Crime and Punishment (1917)
- The Warfare of the Flesh (1917)
- The Caillaux Case (1918)
- Moral Suicide (1918)
- Why America Will Win (1918)
- Three Men and a Girl (1919)
- The Unpardonable Sin (1919)
- Daddy-Long-Legs (1919)
- Don't Ever Marry (1920)
- The River's End (1920)
- The Wonderful Chance (1920)
- The Love Light (1921)
- Just Around the Corner (1921)
- Tol'able David (1921)
- Back Home and Broke (1922)
- The Seventh Day (1922)
- Sonny (1922)
- Fog Bound (1923)
- The Purple Highway (1923)
- The Confidence Man (1924)
- The Great White Way (1924)
- Sinners in Heaven (1924)
- Three Miles Out (1924)
- Unguarded Women (1924)
- Clothes Make the Pirate (1925)
- Fifty-Fifty (1925)
- His Buddy's Wife (1925)
- Corporal Kate (1926)
- Old Loves and New (1926)
- Fighting Love (1927)
- The Heart Thief (1927)
- The Road to Ruin (1928)
- Linda (1929)
- Hell's Angels (1930)
- Playthings of Hollywood (1930)
- Party Girl (1930)
- Primrose Path (1931)
- Ace of Aces (1933)
- Myrt and Marge (1933)
- No Marriage Ties (1933)
- Gigolettes of Paris (1933)
