= Rosita Forbes =

English travel writer, novelist and explorer

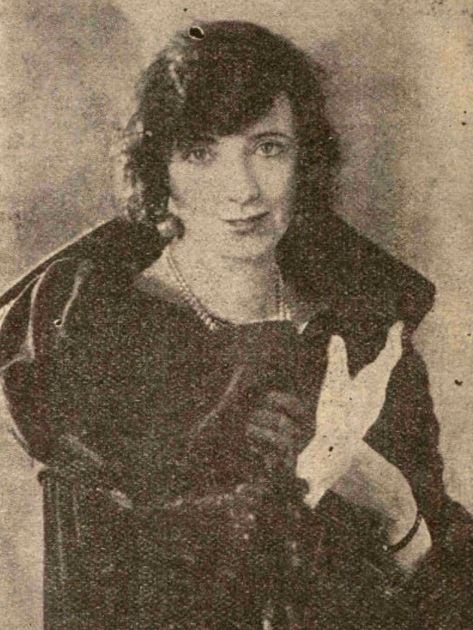
- Born: 16 January 1890
- Died: 30 June 1967 (aged 77)
- Occupations: Travel writer, novelist and explorer

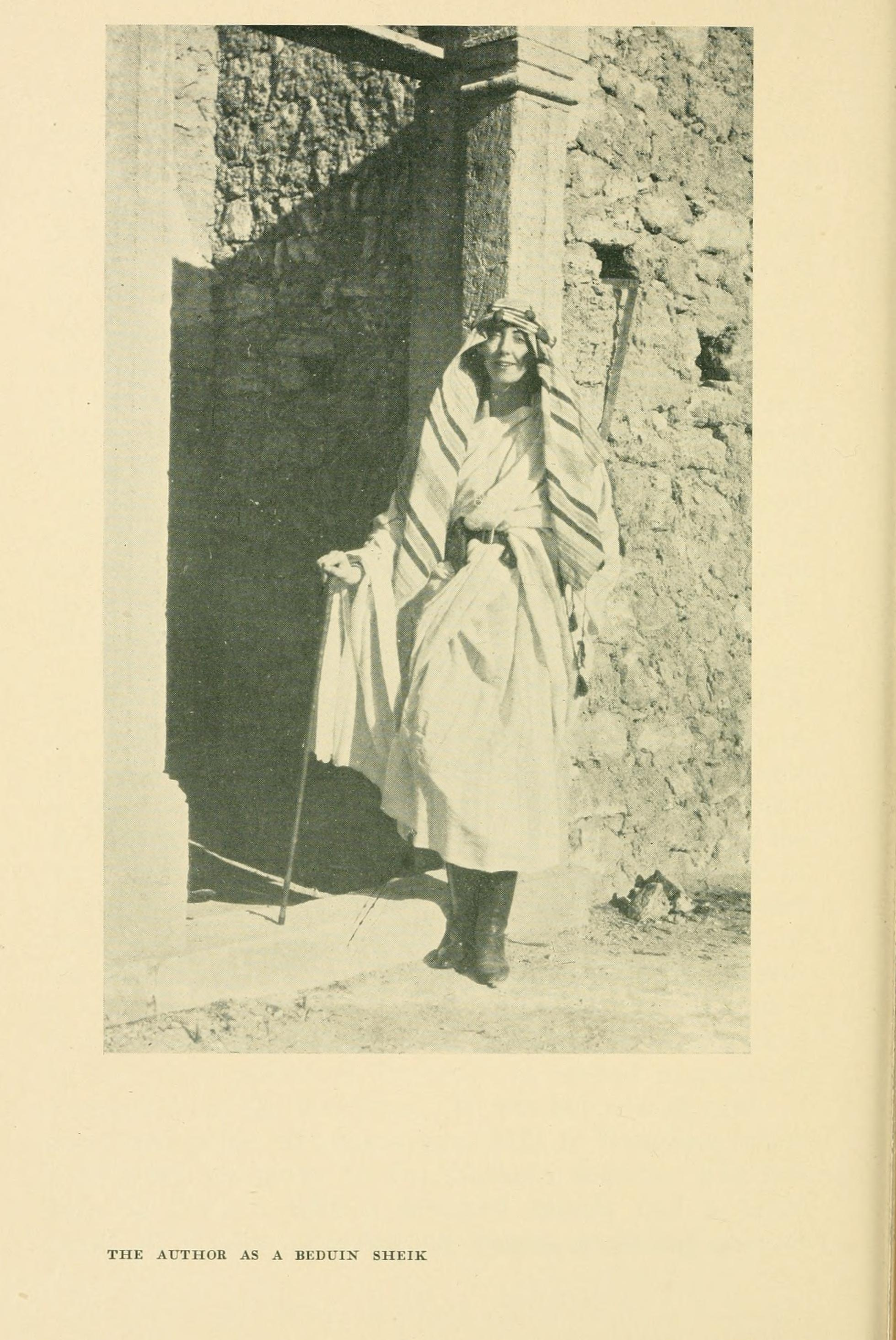
A portrait of Rosita Forbes, published in The Secret of the Sahara: Kufara (1921); BHL25263784

Rosita Forbes, née Joan Rosita Torr, (16 January 1890 – 30 June 1967) was an English travel writer, novelist and explorer. In 1920–1921 she was the first European woman to visit the Kufra Oasis in Libya (together with the Egyptian explorer Ahmed Hassanein), in a period when this was closed to Westerners.

== Early life ==
Joan Rosita Torr was born at Riseholme Hall, near Lincoln, England, the eldest child of Herbert James Torr, a landowner, and Rosita Graham Torr. Her father was a Member of Parliament.

== Career ==
During the First World War she drove an ambulance in France for two years. From 1917 to 1918, she travelled in Asia with another unhappy military wife, Armorel Meinertzhagen, visiting 30 countries. After the war, she and Meinertzhagen travelled in North Africa, "with little money but much ingenuity." The result was her first book, Unconducted Wanderers (1919). The next year, she disguised herself as an Arab woman named "Sitt Khadija" to visit the Kufra Oasis in 1921, the first European woman (and only the second European) known to have seen that location. The way she portrayed the expedition's organiser, Ahmed Hassanein, as a minor part of the journey was criticized by her book's reviewers and his colleagues, who pointed out that he was an Oxford-educated diplomat.

In 1937, Forbes was the second Westerner and first Western woman to visit places from Sahara to Samarkand, which is today are in Libya to Uzbekistan. She had a gift of a genuine traveller; she lived and mixed with the locals, made friends with the Afghans, Indians, Tajiks, Uzbeks, Kazaks and Afghans and bonded well with the natives although she was, most of the time, the only woman during the journey. The journey is described in her travelogue called The Sahara to Samarkand.

Rosita Forbes found an audience as a daring and witty travel writer and lecturer between the wars, and as a novelist; but her reputation was further tarnished in the 1930s by her description of walking through a flower garden with Adolf Hitler, and her meetings with Benito Mussolini. She published a book of interviews in 1940, These Men I Knew, insisting that she was only reporting their politics, not endorsing them; she also lectured in support of the British war effort in Canada and the United States. Soon, the McGraths went to live in the Bahamas to avoid further controversy.

Forbes was made a fellow of the Royal Geographical Society, and received medals from the Royal Antwerp Geographical Society and the French Geographical Society, and an award in 1924 from the Royal Society of Arts. She also made an early travel film, From Red Sea to Blue Nile, and two of her novels became silent films (Fighting Love (1927) and The White Sheik (1928), based on her novels If the Gods Laugh and King's Mate, respectively). Her 1924 biography, The Sultan of the Mountains: The Life Story of Raisuli, was loosely adapted for the screen in 1972 by John Milius as The Wind and the Lion.

== Personal life ==
Joan Rosita Torr married Col. Robert Foster Forbes in 1911. They divorced after she left him in 1917, selling her wedding ring and sailing for South Africa. She was married again in 1921, to Col. Arthur Thomas McGrath. She was widowed in 1962, and she died in 1967, at home in Warwick, Bermuda, aged 77 years.

== Works by Rosita Forbes ==
=== Non-fiction ===
- Unconducted Wanderers, 1919
- The Secret of the Sahara: Kufara, 1921
- The Sultan of the Mountains: The Life Story of Raisuli, 1924
- From Red Sea to Blue Nile: Abyssinian Adventure, 1925 (also published under the title From Red Sea to Blue Nile: A Thousand Miles of Ethiopia?)
- Adventure, 1928
- Conflict: Angora to Afghanistan, 1931
- Eight Republics in Search of a Future: Evolution & Revolution in South America, 1932
- Women called Wild, 1935
- Forbidden Road--Kabul to Samarkand, 1937 (also published under the title Russian Road to India--By Kabul and Samarkand)
- These Are Real People, 1937
- A Unicorn in the Bahamas, 1939
- India of the Princes, 1939
- These Men I Knew, 1940
- Gypsy in the Sun, 1944
- Appointment with Destiny, 1946
- Henry Morgan, Pirate, 1946
- Sir Henry Morgan, Pirate & Pioneer, 1948
- Islands in the Sun, 1949

=== Selected novels ===
- If the Gods Laugh (1925)
- Sirocco (1927)
- King's Mate (1928)
- The Cavaliers of Death (1930)
- The Extraordinary House (1934)
- The Golden Vagabond (1936)
