= Ravensberg =

Ravensburg is a town in Baden-Württemberg, Germany. Ravensberg, Ravensburg, or Ravensburgh may also refer to:

== Places ==
=== Buildings ===
- Burg Ravensburg, a castle in Sulzfeld, Baden-Württemberg
- Ravensburg (Neubrandenburg), ruin of a burgwall or gord in Neubrandenburg, Germany
- Ravensburgh Castle, an iron age camp in Hexron, Hertfordshire, England
- Veitsburg, Ravensburg, historical name of a castle in Baden-Württemberg, Germany

=== Inhabited places ===
- County of Ravensberg, historical county of the Holy Roman Empire
- Ravensburg (district), district in Baden-Württemberg, Germany
- Ravensberg, a city district of Kiel, Schleswig-Holstein, Germany

=== Natural formations ===
- Großer Ravensberg, a hill in Brandenburg, Germany
- Kleiner Ravensberg, an elevation near Potsdam, Germany
- Ravensberg (Harz), a mountain near Bad Sachsa, Germany
- Ravensberg Basin or Ravensberg Hills, a natural region in North Rhine-Westphalia, Germany
- Ravensberg Land, a cultural landscape in North Rhine-Westphalia, Germany

=== Other places ===
- County of Ravensberg, historical territory in Germany
- Minden-Ravensberg, administrative unit of Prussia (1719–1807)
- Ravensburg State Park, Clinton County, Pennsylvania, United States

== People ==
- Margaret of Ravensberg (c. 1320 – 13 February 1389), daughter and heiress of Otto IV, Count of Ravensberg
- House of Calvelage-Ravensberg, rulers of the counties of Calvelage and Ravensberg, 12th–14th centuries

== Other uses ==
- FV Ravensburg, German association football club, Baden-Württemberg, Germany
- Ravensburg University of Cooperative Education, Ravensburg, Stuttgart and Friedrichshafen, Germany
- Ravensburg (album), a 2018 album by Mathias Eick

== See also ==
- Ravensbrück, German concentration camp exclusively for women, 1939–1945
- Ravensburger, German game and toy company
- The White Roses of Ravensberg (disambiguation)
