= Karl Julius Fritzsche =

German film producer

- Born: 30 March 1883; Leipzig, Saxony, German Empire
- Died: 12 October 1954 (aged 71); Munich, Bavaria, West Germany
- Occupation: Producer
- Years active: 1909–1954 (film)

Karl Julius Fritzsche (1883–1954) was a German film producer. He is best known for his role as managing director of the German major studio Tobis Film during the Nazi era.

The son of a baker he originally worked in publishing before entering the film business in 1909. Initially working in distribution he moved into production from 1914. After service in the First World War he founded his own company Transocean-Film which made several films during the silent era. From 1934 he headed a production unit Tobis-Magna, producing several prestige films starring Emil Jannings, and then in 1940 he was promoted to oversee the entire Tobis outfit.

After the Second World War he resumed filmmaking in 1948, establishing a Hamburg-based distribution company Deutsche London Film that handled the release of both foreign and domestic productions.

== Selected filmography ==
- Ikarus, the Flying Man (1918)
- Herzen im Sturm (1921)
- Louise de Lavallière (1922)
- Poor Sinner (1923)
- The Valley of Love (1935)
- A Wedding Dream (1936)
- The Bashful Casanova (1936)
- The Broken Jug (1937)
- The Irresistible Man (1937)
- Truxa (1937)
- The Ruler (1937)
- The Muzzle (1938)
- Robert Koch (1939)
- The Merry Vineyard (1952)
- Pension Schöller (1952)
- Diary of a Married Woman (1953)

== Bibliography ==
- Bock, Hans-Michael . Die Tobis 1928-1945: eine kommentierte Filmografie. Edition Text + Kritik, 2003.
- Moeller, Felix. The Film Minister: Goebbels and the Cinema in the Third Reich. Axel Menges, 2000.
