= Diana Karenne =

Polish actress (1888–1940)

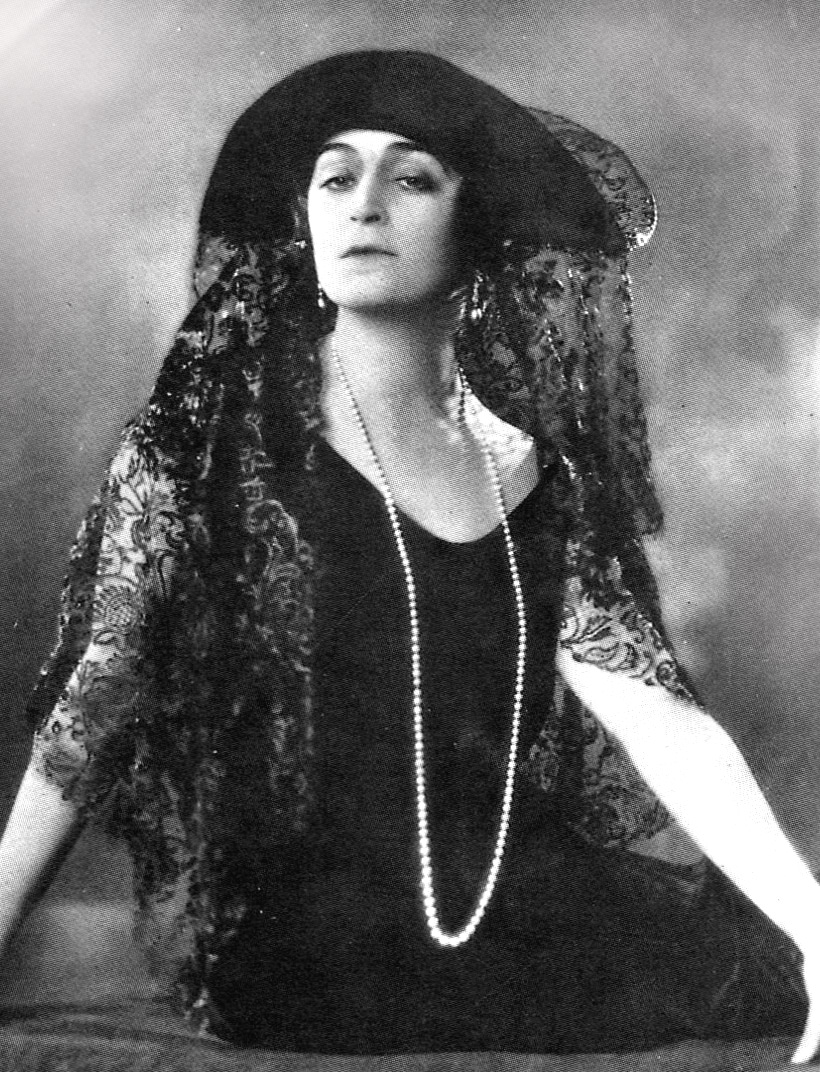
- Born: Dina Rabinovich; 4 July 1889; Kiev, Russian Empire
- Died: 14 October 1940 (aged 51–52); Aachen, Germany
- Occupations: Actress; screenwriter; producer; director
- Years active: 1916-1940

Diana Karenne (born Dina Rabinovich; 4 July 1889 – 14 October 1940) was a Polish film actress and director.

== Career and death ==
She appeared in more than 40 films between 1916 and 1940. In 1917, she opened her film production company in Milan. Injured in a World War II Allied bombing raid on Aachen (Aix-la-Chapelle) in July 1940, after three months in a coma, she died in October of the same year without having regained consciousness.

== Selected filmography ==
- Sofia di Kravonia (1916)
- Redemption (1919)
- Miss Dorothy (1920)
- Sophy of Kravonia; or, The Virgin of Paris (1920)
- Playing with Fire (1921)
- Marie Antoinette, the Love of a King (1922)
- Poor Sinner (1923)
- The Wife of Forty Years (1925)
- The Loves of Casanova (1927)
- The Golden Vein (1928)
- Pawns of Passion (1928)
- A Woman with Style (1928)
- The White Roses of Ravensberg (1929)
- The Queen's Necklace (1929)
