= The White Roses of Ravensberg (1929 film) =

1929 film directed by Rudolf Meinert

- Directed by: Rudolf Meinert
- Written by: Emanuel Alfieri; Johannes Brandt
- Based on: The White Roses of Ravensberg by Eufemia von Adlersfeld-Ballestrem
- Starring: Diana Karenne; Viola Garden; Jack Trevor; Walter Janssen
- Cinematography: Nicolas Farkas
- Music by: Walter Winnig
- Production company: Omnia-Film
- Distributed by: Deutsch-Russische Film-Allianz
- Release date: 26 April 1929
- Running time: 92 minutes
- Country: Germany
- Languages: Silent; German intertitles

The White Roses of Ravensberg (German: Die weißen Rosen von Ravensberg) is a 1929 German silent drama film directed by Rudolf Meinert and starring Diana Karenne, Viola Garden and Jack Trevor. The film was shot at the Staaken Studios in Berlin. It was based on the 1887 novel The White Roses of Ravensberg by Eufemia von Adlersfeld-Ballestrem which had previously been made into a film in 1919.

== Cast ==
- Diana Karenne as Maria von Ravensberg
- Viola Garden as Sigrid von Erlenstein
- Jack Trevor as Dr. Marcel Hochwald
- Walter Janssen as Graf von Erlenstein
- Dolly Davis as Iris von Ravensberg
- Luigi Serventi as von Kurla
- Willi Forst as Boris
- Emil Heyse as Jacob
- John Mylong as Andreas, der Gärtner

== Bibliography ==
- Prawer, S.S. Between Two Worlds: The Jewish Presence in German and Austrian Film, 1910-1933. Berghahn Books, 2007.
