= King's Mate =

1928 novel

- American first edition
- Author: Rosita Forbes
- Language: English
- Genre: Romance
- Publisher: Cassell & Co (UK); MaCauley (US)
- Publication date: 1928
- Publication place: United Kingdom
- Media type: Print

King's Mate (also known as Account Rendered) is a 1928 romantic adventure novel by the British writer and explorer Rosita Forbes. While staying in Morocco a young Englishwoman becomes lost in the desert and is rescued by a mysterious figure known as the White Sheik, who proves to be an Englishman.

== Film adaptation ==
It was made into the 1928 British silent film The White Sheik directed by Harley Knoles and starring Lillian Hall-Davis, Warwick Ward and Jameson Thomas.

== Bibliography ==
- Goble, Alan. The Complete Index to Literary Sources in Film. Walter de Gruyter, 1999.
- Liggins, Emma & Nolan, Elizabeth. Women's Writing of the First World War. Routledge, 2019.
- Watson, George & Willison, Ian R. The New Cambridge Bibliography of English Literature, Volume 4. CUP, 1972.
