= Ballestrem =

German noble family

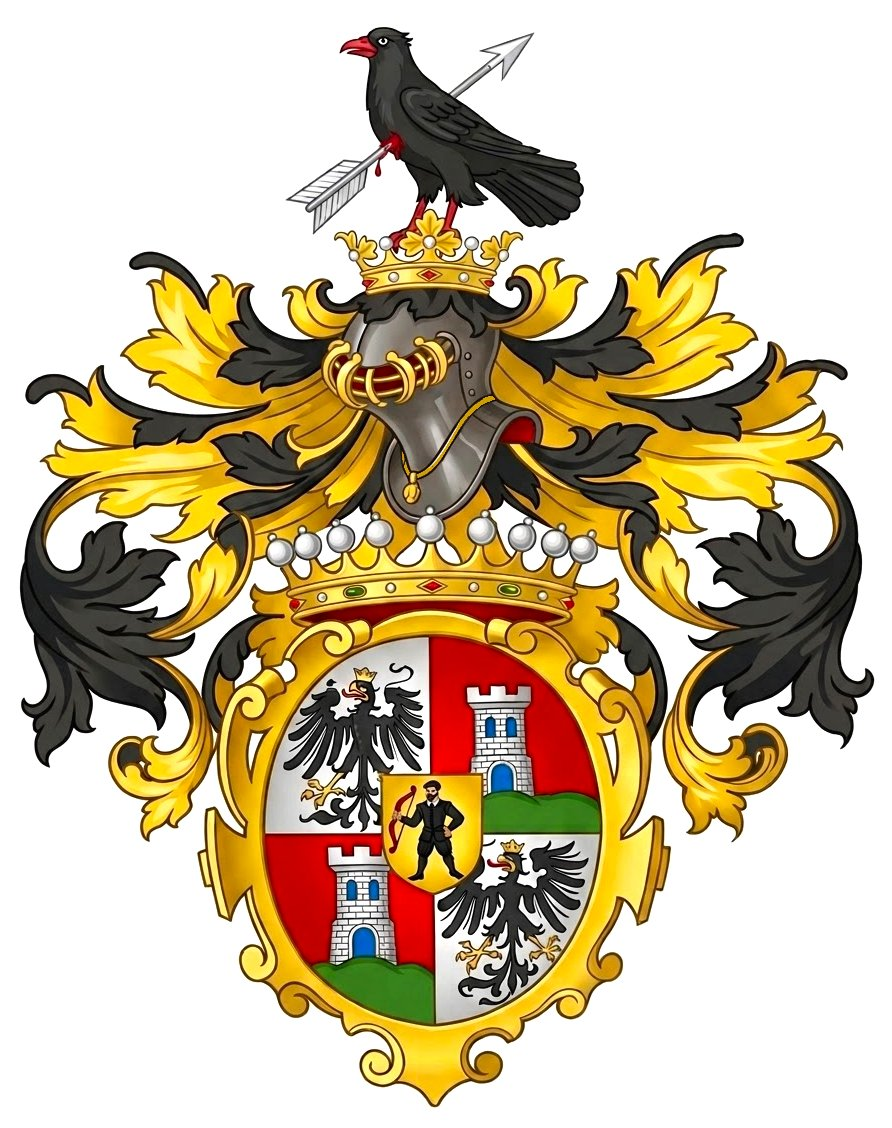
Ballestrem family Coat of Arms

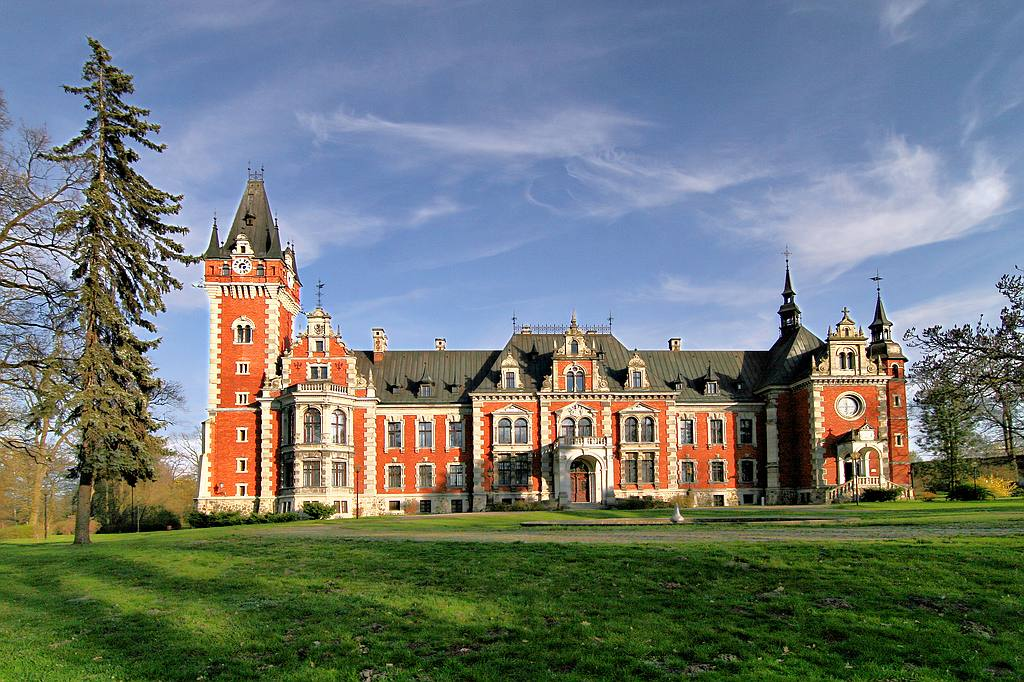
Palace Ballestrem in Pławniowice

The Ballestrem family is a German noble family, originally from Piedmont, Italy. Members of the family held political positions within the German Empire. The family is still extant, despite losing much of their land in 1945.

== History ==
Originally named Ballestrero di Castellengo, they are first attested to as patrician merchants in the sixteenth century. At the end of the seventeenth century, Marco Francesco Antonio Ballestrero was enfeoffed with the County of Montalenghe, near Turin. His son, Count Giovanni Angelo Battista Ballestrero, moved to Germany, taking the name Johann Baptist von Ballestrem and eventually joining the Prussian officer corps. Johann married into the wealthy Stechow family, leading the German Ballestrems to eventually inherit the lucrative Plawniowitz estate in Silesia, then part of Prussia and now part of Poland. In 1742, the family was raised to the title of Count.

== Notable members ==
- Count Franz von Ballestrem (1834-1910), was the tenth President of the Reichstag of the German Empire.
- Countess Eufemia von Ballestrem (1854–1941), was a German aristocratic novelist.
- Countess Lagi von Ballestrem (31 August 1909 – 14 September 1955), was a prominent anti-Nazi who was sent to Ravensbrück concentration camp in 1944.
