= The Hunt for Death =

1920 film

- Directed by: Karl Gerhardt
- Written by: Johannes Brandt; Robert Wiene
- Produced by: Rudolf Meinert; Erich Pommer
- Starring: Lil Dagover
- Cinematography: Paul Holzki
- Production company: Decla-Bioscop
- Distributed by: Decla-Bioscop
- Release date: 22 October 1920
- Country: Germany
- Languages: Silent; German intertitles

The Hunt for Death (German: Die Jagd nach dem Tode) is a 1920 German silent film directed by Karl Gerhardt and starring Lil Dagover. It was followed by three sequels.

The film's art direction was by Hermann Warm.

== Cast ==
In alphabetical order

- Kurt Brenkendorf as Badhama
- Nils Olaf Chrisander as Ingenieur Mc Allen
- Lil Dagover as Tänzerin Malatti
- Ernst Deutsch
- Bernhard Goetzke as Diener Lubzang
- Paul Rehkopf

== Bibliography ==
- Behr, Shulamith; Fanning, David; Jarman, Douglas, eds. (1993). Expressionism Reassessed. Manchester: Manchester University Press. ISBN 978-0-7190-3844-0.
