= Anna Milder-Hauptmann =

German opera singer (1785–1838)

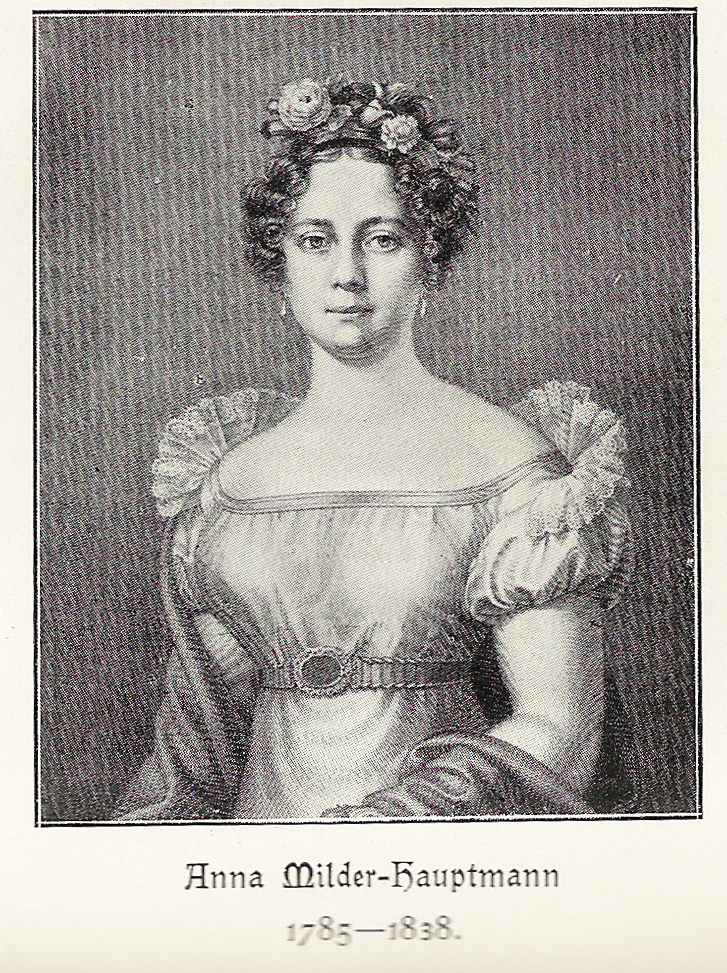
Anna Milder-Hauptmann

Pauline Anna Milder-Hauptmann (Note: She was mostly called Anna Milder. Before her marriage, she was often referred to on playbills, reviews and correspondence as Mlle Milder, sometimes as Nanny Milder. After her marriage, many documents refer to her as Madame Milder.) (13 December 1785 – 29 May 1838) was an operatic soprano. Her career spanned a remarkable period in Western classical music: early on, she sang for Joseph Haydn; she later premiered some songs by Franz Schubert; and toward the end of her career sang in the celebrated revival of J. S. Bach's Saint Matthew Passion under the direction of Felix Mendelssohn. Above all, Milder is remembered for having sung the demanding role of Leonore at the premieres of all three versions (1805, 1806, 1814) of Beethoven's opera Fidelio.

== Biography ==
=== Early life ===
Milder was born in Constantinople where her father, Felix Milder from Salzburg, was employed by the Austrian ambassador Baron Herbert von Rathkeal as "Kabinets-Courier"; her mother was lady-in-waiting to the ambassador's wife. When Anna was five years old, the family left for Bucharest, where Felix worked as translator until they had to leave because of the Austro-Turkish War (1788–1791). After he had briefly worked for the ambassador again, the family returned to Bucharest, only to be forced to flee again when pestilence broke out there. After quarantine in Herrmannstadt, the family settled in Vienna.

Here Anna, now aged 10, received her first formal education which included the German language she had not spoken before (she was already fluent in French, Italian, modern Greek and Romanian). She was exposed to opera and church music, and begged her parents to let her receive a musical education. After some initial, and inadequate, teaching by a local schoolmaster, she was heard (at age 16) by the composer Sigismund von Neukomm, who then taught her for two years. Milder had astonished Neukomm at her audition by effortlessly singing the famous high-tessitura Queen of the Night aria by Mozart; under his instruction she developed fullness and beauty of sound in her mid and lower registers. On the advice of Emanuel Schikaneder, Milder also studied with Antonio Salieri.

=== Early career ===
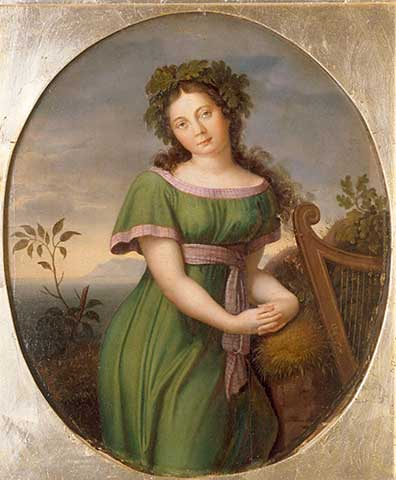
As Malvina in Étienne Méhul's opera Uthal, painting by Friedrich Wilhelm von Schadow

By age 19, Milder was ready for a professional career. Emanuel Schikaneder had opened the Theater an der Wien in 1801. Josepha Weber, Mozart's sister-in-law, was a friend of Neukomm's and negotiated on his behalf for a position for Anna there. Milder was engaged for 500 florins, and made her stage debut there as Juno in Süßmayr's opera Der Spiegel von Arkadien on 9 April 1803. Soon she won major roles and moved to the Theater am Kärntnertor, with a contract worth 2,000 florins. In 1805, she sang the title role in the first performance of Beethoven's Leonore, and again in the second and third versions in 1806 and 1814, when in the final revision its title was changed to Fidelio, as it is known today'. Luigi Cherubini wrote his German opera Faniska for her in 1806. see details below.

=== 1809–1813 ===
In 1809, Milder sang before Napoleon in Schönbrunn Palace outside Vienna (it was his palace at the time, his army having occupied Vienna). He was so impressed by her performance in Martín's opera Una cosa rara and other works that he invited her to Paris, but she refused due to her impending marriage to Viennese jeweler Peter Hauptmann in 1810. Peter Hauptmann (1763–1858) maintained at this time his own house theater in the Trattnerhof. The marriage was not happy, they had a daughter in 1811 and later the couple lived separately. She contributed to the success of Joseph Weigl's Das Waisenhaus (1808) and, as Emmeline, Die Schweizer Familie (1809). Her performance in Gluck's Iphigénie en Tauride in 1812 was largely responsible for the Gluck revival in Vienna and Berlin. She sang in the first Vienna performance of Cherubini's Médée in 1812. In 1812 and 1813, she toured Breslau, Berlin, Karlsruhe, Stuttgart and Frankfurt.

=== 1814–1838 ===
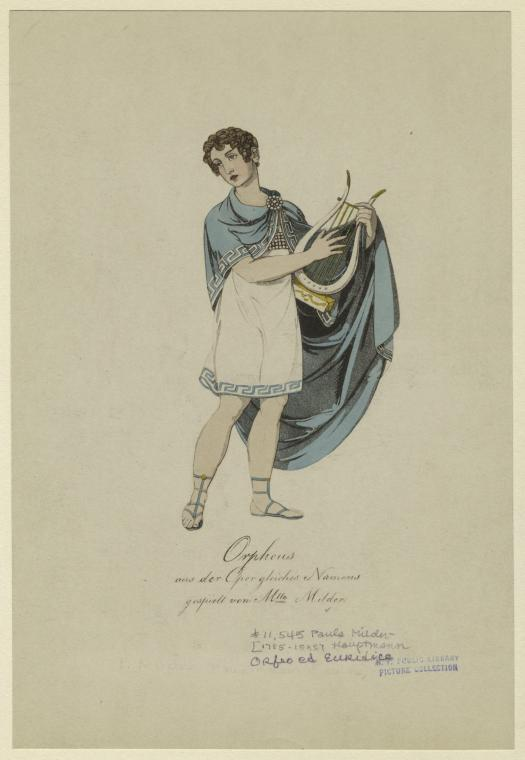
In the title role of the opera Orpheus (1807) by the Viennese composer and journalist Friedrich August Kanne

The Austrian currency fell sharply around 1814, and Milder-Hauptmann received offers for roles at the Berlin Court Opera. Accompanied by her sister Jeanette Antonie Bürde, an accomplished composer and pianist, she travelled to Berlin in May 1815 where she would stay for the next 14 years. Gaspare Spontini was music director at the Berlin Court Opera, and she sang the role of Statira in the first Berlin performance of his opera Olimpie in 1821 as well as in the premieres of his operas Nurmahal (as Namouna) in 1822 and Agnes von Hohenstaufen (as Irmengard) in 1827. She again sang in operas by Gluck and Weigl in Berlin, was appointed prima donna assoluta and became a member of the Sing-Akademie zu Berlin in 1821. On 11 March 1829, she sang in Mendelssohn's momentous revival of Bach's St Matthew Passion. Mendelssohn wrote the concert aria "Tutto è silenzio" in 1829 for her. Following a quarrel with Spontini, she left Berlin in 1829 and visited Russia, Sweden and Denmark. She then returned to Berlin, where she made her last public appearance in 1836.

She died in Berlin in 1838 and is buried on the Alter Domfriedhof St. Hedwig.

=== Her work with Beethoven ===
The central part of Leonore in Fidelio, a demanding role, was written by Beethoven specifically for Anna Milder. Beethoven later twice made major revisions to his opera (1806, 1814) and on both occasions Milder returned to take the title role.

Milder had a substantial influence on the final 1814 form of the opera in demanding modifications to her extended scena in Act 1. Winton Dean writes, "Milder later told Anton Schindler that she had severe struggles with Beethoven over 'the unbeautiful, unsingable passages [the Act 1 scena], unsuited to her voice'." Later sopranos may be grateful to Milder for prevailing in this struggle, since the changes she insisted on made the aria easier to sing. But Dean also opines that Beethoven's changes were a major improvement in the music itself, making it "terser and more concentrated".

Milder was intended to sing Beethoven's concert aria "Ah, perfido!", Op. 65, at his massive Academy Concert on 22 December 1808 (when the Fifth and Sixth Symphonies, Fourth Piano Concerto and Choral Fantasia were heard for the first time under the composer's direction), but following a quarrel between Beethoven and Peter Hauptmann, Milder's soon-to-be husband, she refused and was replaced (disastrously) by a young singer named Josephine Killitschky.

Beethoven admired Milder very much and sought to create a new opera that would again feature her in a prominent role, even after she moved to Berlin in 1816 (where she was again very successful in the local production of Fidelio). This is known through a friendly letter from Beethoven to Milder sent in 1816. However, though many candidate libretti were considered by the composer during his remaining years, he never wrote another opera.

In later life Milder made five visits to Vienna in order to visit her daughter there. On one such visit (4 July 1824), she paid a call on Beethoven, and the friendly business chat they carried out is partially preserved. Milder spoke to the deaf Beethoven's nephew Karl, who wrote down what she said in the composer's conversation book, still preserved today. Beethoven's replies are lost, since he communicated orally.

== Reputation and opinion ==
Milder's voice was repeatedly praised for its strength and beauty. Joseph Haydn once said to the young Milder, after she had sung an aria for him, "My dear child, you have a voice like a house." Haydn's biographer Georg August Griesinger described her voice as being "like pure metal". Johann Friedrich Reichardt said Milder's voice was the most beautiful he had heard since Elisabeth Mara's. Goethe was deeply moved by Milder's performance when he heard her in 1823 in Marienbad; on the occasion of Milder's 25th stage anniversary on 9 April 1828, he sent her a dedicated copy of his play Iphigenia in Tauris. Similarly, after a successful production of Gluck's Alceste, the composer's nephew presented Milder with a miniature painting of Gluck and the score of Alceste.

Milder was however criticised for a lack of vocal agility. Schubert said: "her voice is the best, her trills are the worst." Generally, her performances of works by Rossini were disliked by critics.

== Dedications ==
Many composers dedicated works to Milder-Hauptmann, including Bernhard Klein, Neukomm, Carl Blum, Conradin Kreutzer, Joseph Wolfram, Carl Borromäus von Miltitz. Among the more notable works are:

Kreutzer wrote his monodrama Adele von Budoy (1821, in 1823 revived as Cordelia with Wilhelmine Schröder-Devrient) for Milder. Franz Schubert wrote the lied "Der Hirt auf dem Felsen", D. 965, for Milder-Hauptmann which she premiered in Riga on 10 February 1830 and later that year also sang in Berlin. Milder had previously premiered Schubert's song "Die Forelle" and he had in 1824 dedicated the lied "Suleika II", D. 717, to her; the role of Estrella in his opera Alfonso und Estrella was designed for her, but the opera was never performed during Schubert's lifetime. The Allgemeine musikalische Zeitung (XVI, 1814, col. 315) wrote: "Happy those for whom works are written!" (Wohl denen, für die eigens componiert wird!).
