= The Heart Thief =

1927 film by Nils Olaf Chrisander

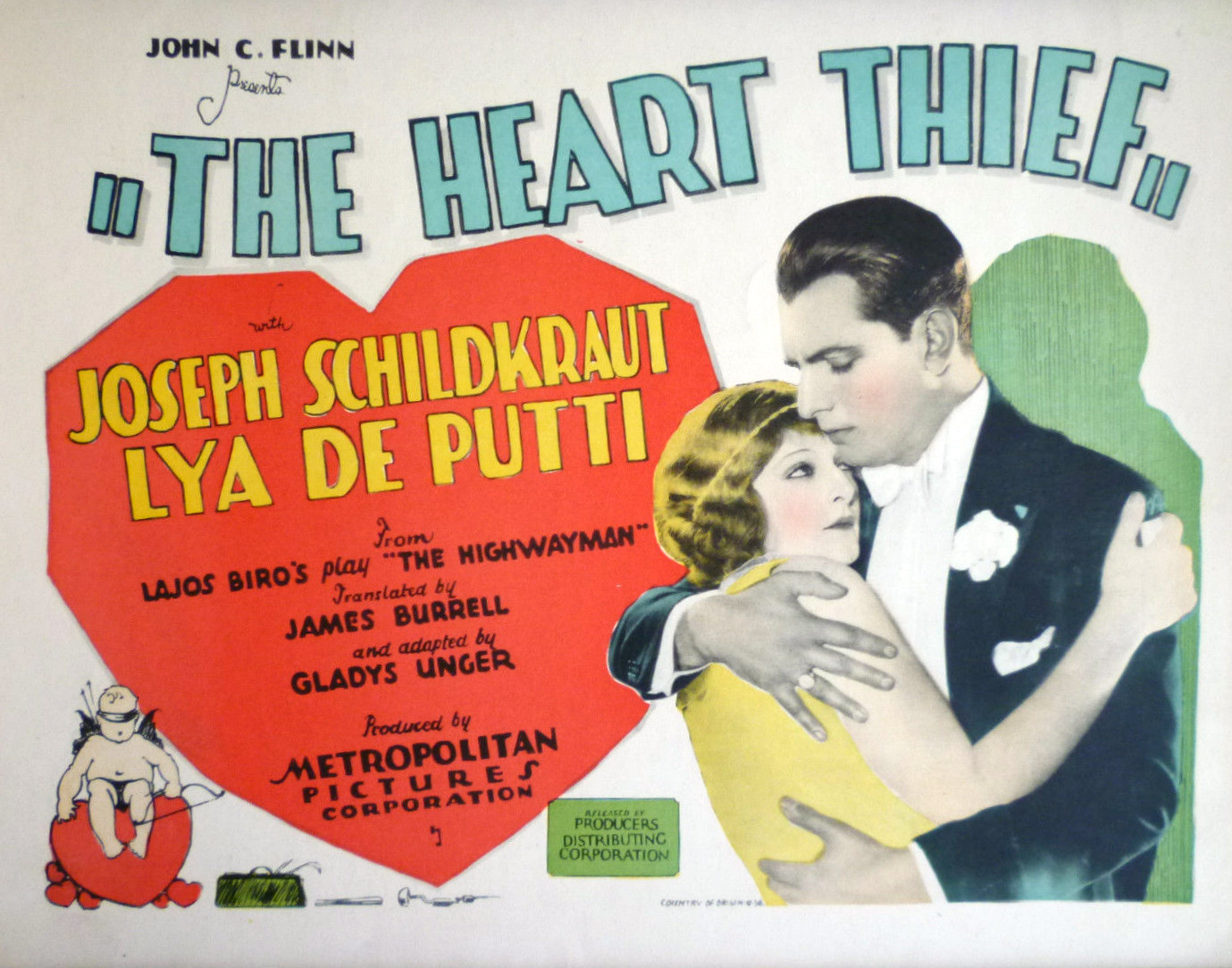
- Lobby card
- Directed by: Nils Olaf Chrisander
- Written by: Sonya Levien; Leslie Mason; Gladys Unger
- Based on: "A Rablólovag" by Lajos Bíró
- Starring: Joseph Schildkraut; Lya De Putti; Robert Edeson
- Cinematography: Henry Cronjager
- Production company: Metropolitan Pictures Corporation of California
- Distributed by: Producers Distributing Corporation
- Release date: May 2, 1927
- Running time: 6 reels
- Country: United States
- Language: Silent (English intertitles)

The Heart Thief is a 1927 American silent romantic drama film directed by Nils Olaf Chrisander and starring Joseph Schildkraut, Lya De Putti, and Robert Edeson.

== Cast ==
- Joseph Schildkraut as Paul Kurt
- Lya De Putti as Anna Gallambos
- Robert Edeson as Count Franz Cserhati
- Charles K. Gerrard as Count Lazlos
- Eulalie Jensen as Countess Lazlos
- George Reehm as Galambos
- William Bakewell as Victor

== Preservation ==
A print of The Heart Thief is located in the collection of the Centre national du cinéma et de l'image animée.

== Bibliography ==
- Bock, Hans-Michael & Bergfelder, Tim. The Concise CineGraph. Encyclopedia of German Cinema. Berghahn Books, 2009. ISBN 978-1-57181-655-9
