= The Rejuvenation of Aunt Mary (1914 film) =

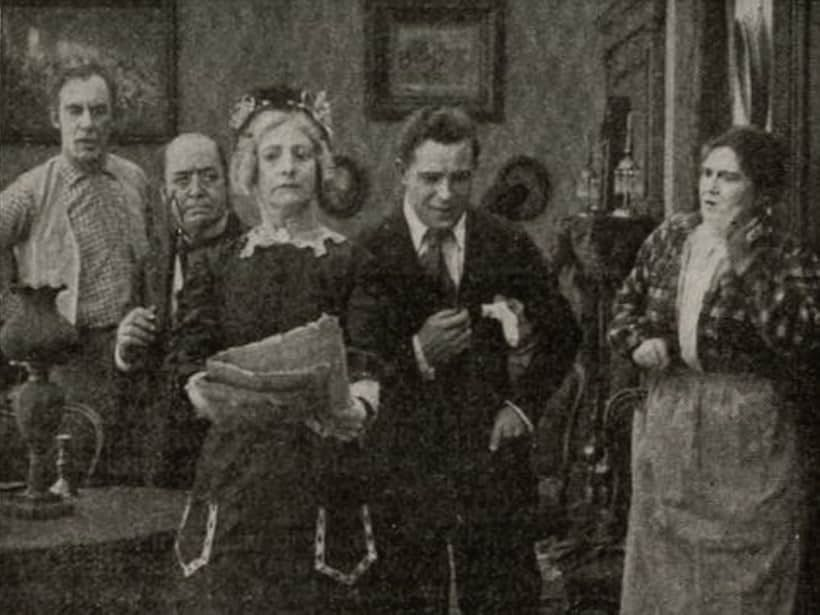
- Film still
- Directed by: Edward Dillon
- Written by: Anne Warner(play)
- Produced by: Klaw & Erlanger
- Cinematography: Henry Cronjager
- Distributed by: General Film Company
- Release date: March 15, 1916
- Running time: 4 reels
- Country: United States
- Language: English

The Rejuvenation of Aunt Mary (1914)

The Rejuvenation of Aunt Mary is a 1914 silent film comedy produced by Klaw and Erlanger in association with the Biograph Company. It is based on a Broadway play, The Rejuvenation of Aunt Mary by Anne Warner which starred May Robson.

A print is preserved at the Library of Congress.

== Cast ==
- Reggie Morris - Jack Denham
- Gertrude Bambrick - Betty Burnett
- Kate Toncray - Aunt Mary
- Dell Henderson - Aunt Mary's Sweetheart

== See also ==
- The Rejuvenation of Aunt Mary (1927)
