= Jeanette Antonie Bürde =

Austrian pianist and singer (1799–1875)

Jeanette Antonie Bürde (11 November 1799 – 29 September 1875) was an Austrian pianist, singer, composer and teacher, who lived most of her career in Berlin.

== Life ==
She was born in 1799 in Hütteldorf, a district of Vienna. Her father Felix Milder, from Salzburg, was pastry-cook to the Austrian ambassador Peter Philipp Herbert Freiherr von Rathkeal. Anna Milder-Hauptmann, the opera singer, was her elder sister.

In Vienna she had piano lessons with Leonhard Mälzel, and singing lessons with Giuseppe Tomaselli and Giovanni Liverati. She went to Berlin in 1816 with her sister, who was engaged at the court opera, and appeared there as a concert pianist; from 1821 she appeared as a singer. She became a member in 1823 of the Berliner Singakademie, which helped her career. She studied composition with Carl Friedrich Rungenhagen, and afterwards published several songs.

She married in 1824 Friedrich Leopold Bürde, a painter and professor at the Prussian Academy of Arts. They had two children, one of whom died aged two. Friedrich Leopold Bürde died in 1849, and she afterwards taught piano and singing. She died in 1875 in Berlin.
