= Jenny Bürde-Ney =

German soprano (1826-1886)

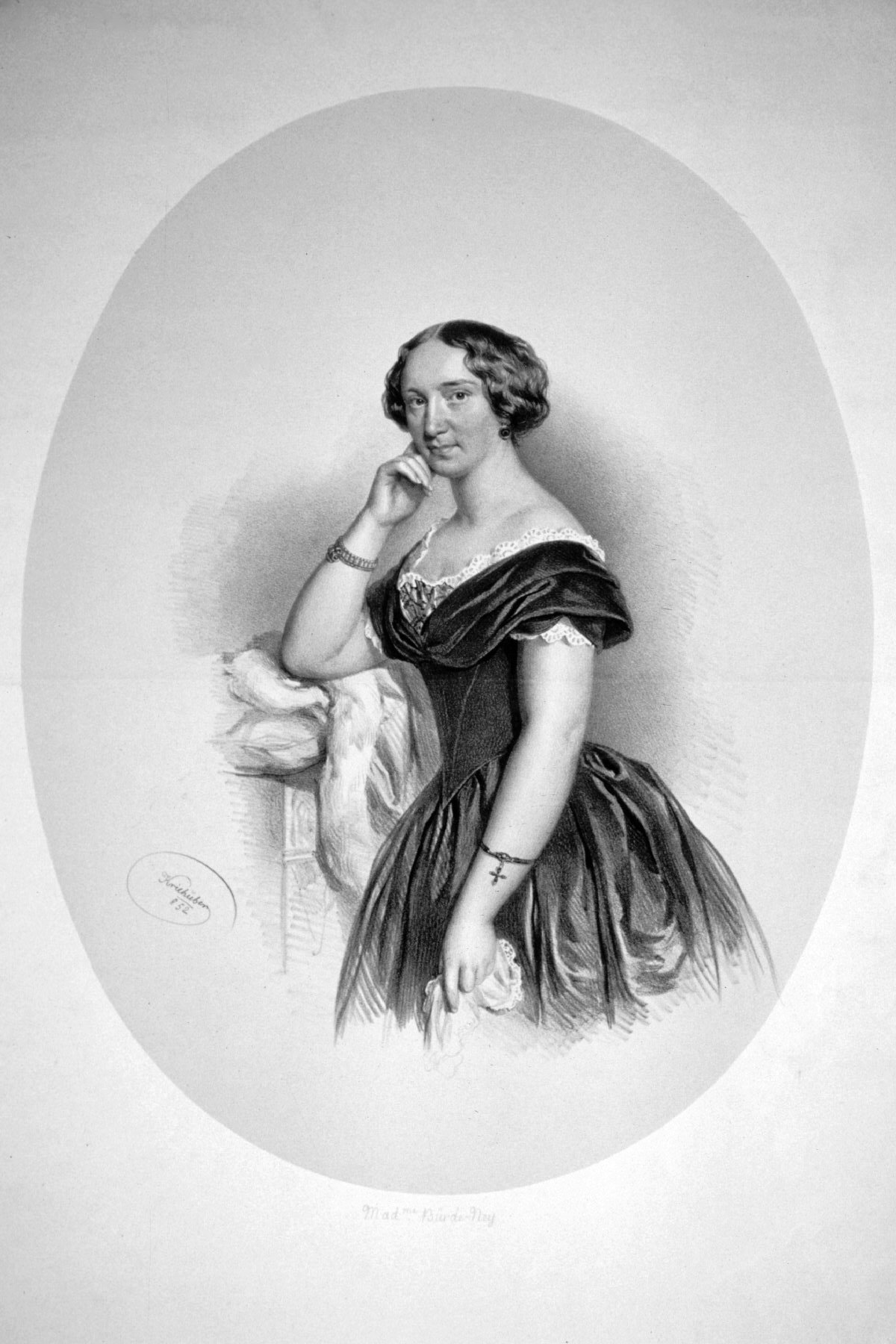
Jenny Bürde-Ney, lithograph by Josef Kriehuber, 1852

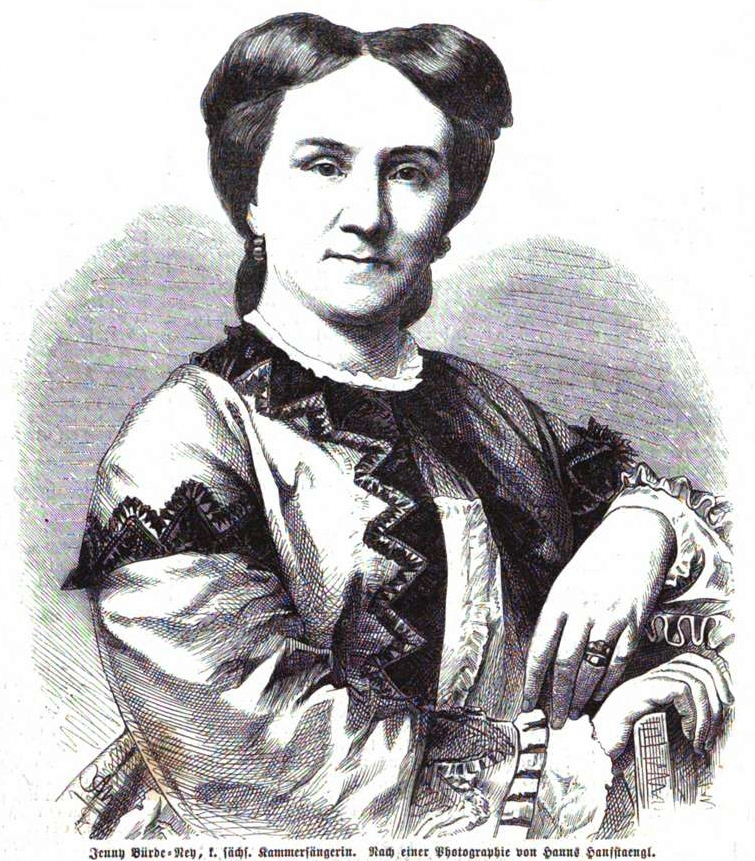
Portrait by Adolf Neumann after a photo by Hanns Hanfstängl (1867)

Jenny Bürde-Ney (December 21, 1824, Graz - May 7, 1886, Dresden) was a German operatic soprano. She performed many leading roles in prestigious opera houses, and later became a singing teacher.

== Early life ==
The daughter of singer Katharina Ney-Segatta, Bürde-Ney was trained from an early age by her mother.

== Career ==
=== Operatic roles ===
In her first recorded major role in 1845 she sang the title role in Bellini's Norma in the city of Olomouc, now in the Czech Republic. Between 1847-1848 she was engaged in Prague, and between 1848-1850 in Lviv. After Lviv, she was invited to Vienna by the Wiener Hofoper, now the Vienna State Opera. During her time in Vienna she also made appearances abroad. She appeared as Leonora in the British premiere of Verdi's Il trovatore at Covent Garden, and also appeared at the same location with Karl Formes in Fidelio in 1852. After working in Vienna until 1853 (when her mother died) she moved to Dresden, where she developed into an artist of European reputation at the Dresden Königliches Opernhaus, which incidentally burned down shortly after her retirement. Her engagement in Dresden followed in the footsteps of the notable soprano Wilhelmine Schröder-Devrient. Among her roles in Dresden were Pamina in Mozart's The Magic Flute.

=== Teacher and church singer ===
Bürde-Ney retired from the opera stage in 1866, and became a singing teacher in Dresden. She also frequently sang at the Catholic Church of the Royal Court of Saxony, now known simply as Dresden Cathedral.

Among her students were Eufemia von Adlersfeld-Ballestrem and Emmy Sonntag-Uhl.

== Personal life ==
Bürde-Ney married the actor Emil Bürde in 1856. She died in 1886.
