= Edward Cronjager =

American cinematographer (1904–1960)

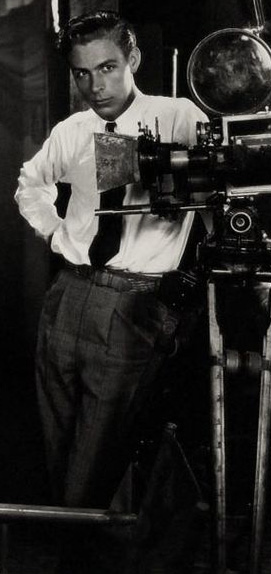
- Cronjager on the set of the 1928 film Moran of the Marines
- Born: March 21, 1904; New York City, New York, U.S.
- Died: June 15, 1960 (aged 56); Hollywood, California, U.S.
- Occupation: Cinematographer
- Years active: 1925–60

Edward Cronjager (21 March 1904 – 15 June 1960) was an American cinematographer whose career spanned from the silent era through the 1950s. He came from a family of cinematographers, with his father, uncle, and brother all working in the film industry behind the camera. His work covered over 100 films and included projects on the small screen towards the end of his career. He filmed in black and white and color mediums, and his work received nominations for seven Academy Awards over three decades, although he never won the statue.

He was the preferred director of photography of early film star Richard Dix and served on several Academy of Motion Picture Arts and Sciences (AMPAS) committees, as well as being selected by the American Society of Cinematographers (ASC) to test new types of film stock. Cronjager pioneered several new techniques and types of cinematography, developing new camera angles in the 1920s, working on one of the earliest film noirs in the 1940s, and using CinemaScope in underwater photography in the 1950s.

== Early life ==
Cronjager was born into a film family in New York City in 1904. His father and uncle, Henry and Jules (respectively), were famous cinematographers during the first two decades of the twentieth century. They worked with companies such as Edison, Biograph and Fox Film Corporation. Edward's brother, Henry Jr., was also a famous cinematographer, although his filmography is sometimes confused with that of his father due to the similarity of names and the fact that the active years of their careers overlapped. Edward's nephew (Henry Jr.'s son) was the Emmy Award-winning, William Cronjager. Before following in his father's footsteps, Cronjager would work as an assistant machinist.

== Career ==
=== The silent film years ===
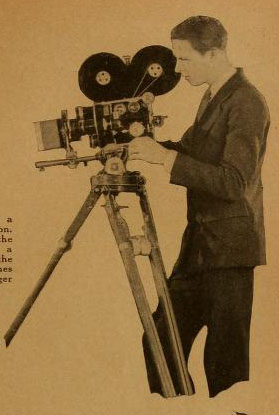
Cronjager operating a hand-grind camera of the 1920s

One of Cronjager's first efforts behind the lens was at the age of 19, filming the heavyweight championship bout between Jack Dempsey and Luis Ángel Firpo in 1923. He began his career in the film industry in 1925 with the Famous Players–Lasky film corporation (later Paramount Pictures), where he remained until 1930. His first project was the silent film, Womanhandled, starring Richard Dix, which would be shot at Lasky's Long Island, New York studio, where Cronjager worked until being transferred to Lasky's west coast operation in 1927. The Film Daily called his work on the picture "very good". During the next four years he photographed fifteen silent films, of which twelve starred Dix, and he shot almost every one of the twenty-nine pictures Dix made between 1927 and 1933. In addition, in 1927 Cronjager joined the American Society of Cinematographers (ASC).

By 1928 he was credited with developing several new camera angles. Cronjager was lauded by industry magazines such as Variety for his inventive camera work in 1928's Warming Up, which added realism to the efforts of Dix as a baseball pitcher. In September 1928 Cronjager became involved in a minor controversy. The film industry was becoming unionized, and Cronjager was resistant to joining. When Dix insisted Cronjager photograph his next film, Moran of the Marines, the union threatened to strike if the cinematographer was hired without becoming a union member. Cronjager joined the union at the studio's request, averting the threatened union action. Throughout his career, Dix attempted to have Cronjager as the cinematographer on his films.

=== The sound era and RKO years ===
His first sound film, 1929's Nothing But the Truth, also starred Dix, and was directed by Victor Schertzinger. His next film in 1929, again directed by Schertzinger and starring Dix, was Redskin. Filmed in two-strip technicolor, the film has been part of modern exhibitions about early color cinematography. At one such exhibition in 2015, at the Museum of Modern Art in New York, it was described as "the film’s true star is the extraordinary location photography in Arizona's Canyon de Chelly and New Mexico's Valley of the Enchanted Mesa." Kevin Brownlow, a British film historian, noted:

The color in the original print is breathtaking; Redskin leaves an impression of a kaleidoscope of awe-inspiring backgrounds, with such much happening in the foreground that one hardly has time to take in the whole frame. The color is used for emotional impact; black and white (toned amber) represents the world of the white man; color is reserved for scenes of Indian life.

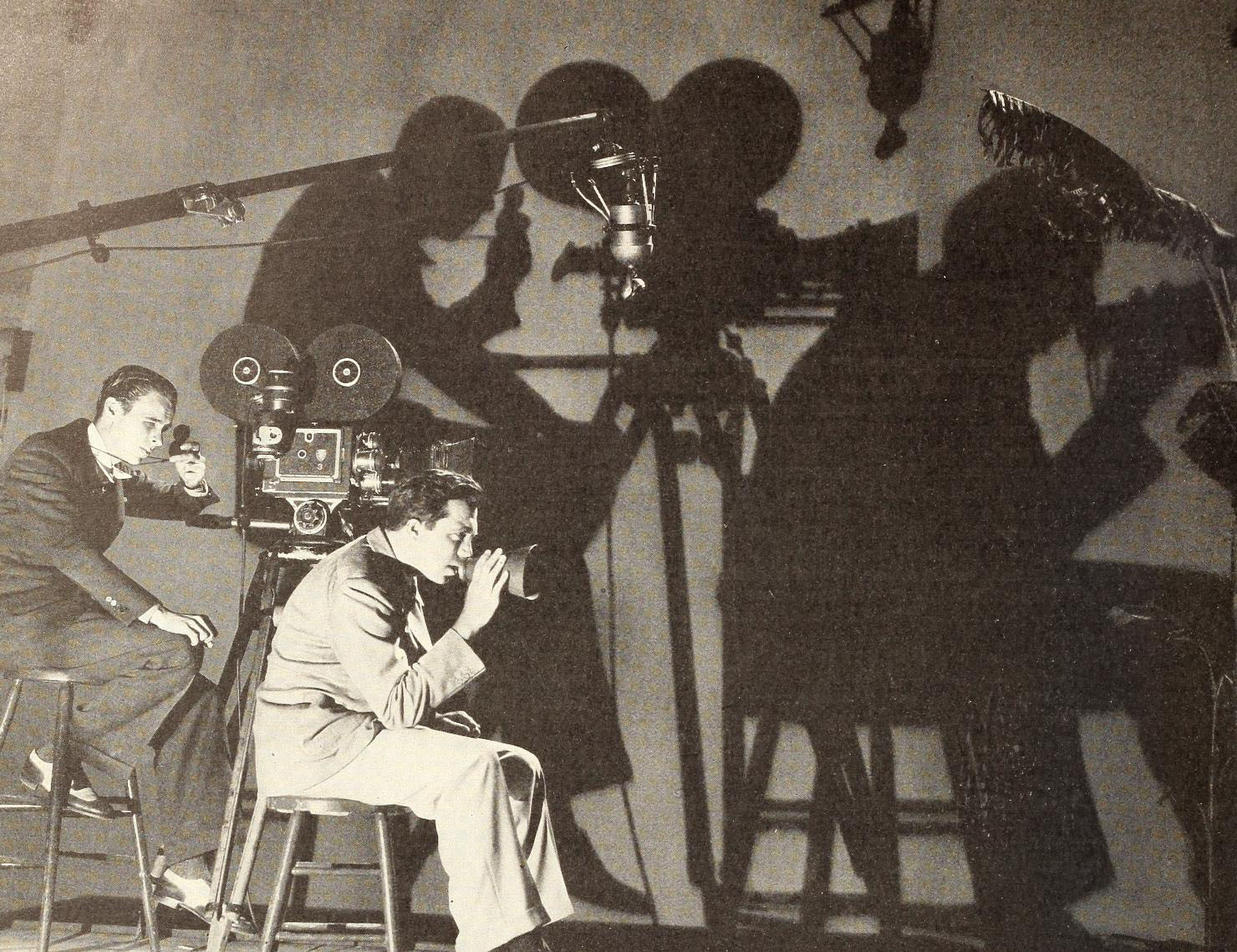
Edward Cronjager working with the director, King Vidor, on the 1932 film Bird of Paradise

In 1930 both Cronjager and Dix moved from Paramount Pictures to RKO Radio Pictures. The following year, 1931, he received his first Academy Award nomination, for Cimarron. During production, Cronjager utilized up to 27 cameras at once, especially during the land rush scenes. In addition, he used over two million feet of film during the production, 250,000 of them during the land rush scenes alone; he communicated with his cameramen through army surplus field telephones. The film was nominated for seven Oscars, winning three (Outstanding Production, Best Screenplay Adaptation, and Best Art Direction). Cronjager lost to Floyd Crosby's work on Tabu.

When a new type of film allowing the photographing of faster-moving action was introduced in 1931, Cronjager was one of the cinematographers who participated in the ASC's field testing of the product. In 1932 Cronjager worked with two other well-known cinematographers, Lucien Andriot and Clyde De Vinna, on King Vidor's film, Bird of Paradise. The individual results of the three photographers were very high quality, but the integration of their work, all with very different styles, proved less than desirable to critics. Cronjager worked with Dix again in 1933, on the film The Lost Squadron, which also starred Mary Astor, and was directed by George Archainbaud.

In 1934 he photographed the film Kentucky Kernels, starring the comedy team of Wheeler & Woolsey. More importantly, Edward got to work with his father, Henry Sr., on the final film of Henry's career. 1936 saw his tenure at RKO come to an end, when he decided to turn down a new contract and enter the freelance arena; he shot films at both RKO and Paramount during the remainder of the year. The year also saw Cronjager's selection to the Academy of Motion Picture Arts and Sciences (AMPAS) nominating rules committee for the cinematography Oscar.

=== Tenure at Fox, and his later years ===
In 1937 Cronjager moved to the studio with which he would be most associated, 20th Century Fox. One of the first films he shot for Fox was Sonja Henie's screen debut, One in a Million, a collaboration that would continue over the next decade. He was selected for the AMPAS cinematography committee once more in 1937, and again for the third year in a row in 1938.

In January 1940, Cronjager was again named to the rules committee of AMPAS, regarding the Oscar for cinematography. The 1940s saw Cronjager receive five Academy Award nominations. The first was for the 1941 film, Sun Valley Serenade, starring Henie. Cronjager's work was called excellent by several publications, including American Cinematographer, with "one or two sequences so exceptional that it is worth seeing the picture for them alone." He lost to Arthur Miller's work on How Green Was My Valley. In 1941 Cronjager shot one of the earliest film noirs, I Wake Up Screaming, starring Betty Grable and Victor Mature, directed by H. Bruce Humberstone. A recent review by Gary Giddins of The New York Sun, called I Wake Up Screaming "one of the most beautiful black-and-white movies ever made."

The following year, Cronjager left Fox and resumed freelance cinematography. Before he went freelance, two of the films he shot at Fox garnered Oscar nominations for him in two different categories: To the Shores of Tripoli for color cinematography, and The Pied Piper for best cinematography in the black and white medium. He won neither, losing to Joseph Ruttenberg in the black and white category for Mrs. Miniver, and to Leon Shamroy for the color cinematography in The Black Swan. Cronjager manned the camera for the classic My Friend Flicka in 1943, starring Roddy McDowall; but it was his work on Heaven Can Wait which earned him his fifth Oscar nomination, this one for color film photography. D. W. Griffith called Cronjager's work in Heaven Can Wait "the best color footage ever made". He would lose to Hal Mohr and W. Howard Greene for Phantom of the Opera. Cronjager received his fifth nomination in four years for his work on 1944's Home in Indiana, directed by Henry Hathaway, and starring Walter Brennan; he lost again, this time to Leon Shamroy for his photography of the film Wilson. His color photography on 1946's Do You Love Me?, starring Maureen O'Hara, Dick Haymes, and Harry James, was called "superbly filmed in Technicolor", contributing to the film's appeal and success.

Cronjager filmed a dozen pictures during the first half of the 1950s, culminating in another Oscar nomination, his seventh and final, for 1954's Beneath the 12-Mile Reef, which featured his underwater photography using the "Aquaflex", a French underwater camera, the first use of CinemaScope underwater. He lost again, this time to Loyal Griggs for his filmwork on Shane. His color work on the location shooting for the 1953 film, Treasure of the Golden Condor, was lauded as stunning. In the remaining six years of his career, he would work on only five films, the fifth of which would be released after his death. In the late 1950s and 1960 he also worked on several television series, including Sea Hunt and Sam Peckinpah's The Westerner.

== Personal life and death ==
In January 1931, Cronjager married Ziegfeld showgirl Muriel Finley. The two divorced at the end of 1932. He was married a second time, in 1935, to actress Kay Sutton; their marriage was announced in September 1935, and their divorce in September 1937. His third marriage took place in August 1942, when he wed Yvette Bentley, a young actress who appeared in a total of three films from 1942 to 1944.

In the early 1950s, Cronjager began to fall ill. While he continued to work for the remainder of the decade, the work became sporadic. The final picture he filmed was The Threat. He died on June 15, 1960, aged 56, three months before the release of his last film, The Devil's Partner, although he had filmed it two years earlier. Cronjager had been injured several weeks prior to his death while on the set of a picture, when he had intervened to stop a fight between two stuntmen, although his death was listed as natural causes.
