= Nils Olaf Chrisander =

Swedish actor and film director

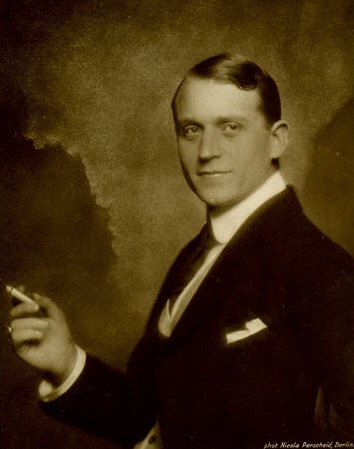
- Chrisander photographed by Nicola Perscheid, c. 1915
- Born: Waldemar Olaf Chrisander; 14 February 1884; Stockholm, Sweden
- Died: 5 June 1947 (aged 63); Skurup, Sweden
- Occupations: Film director, Actor
- Years active: 1914–1927

Nils Olaf Chrisander (born Waldemar Olaf Chrisander; 14 February 1884 – 5 June 1947) was a Swedish actor and film director in the early part of the twentieth century.

== Biography ==
Chrisander's first screen appearances as an actor were in German and Swedish silent films in the mid-1910s. His first motion picture role was in the 1915 Carl Schönfeld-directed German silent film drama Um ein Weib.

As an actor, Chrisander is possibly best recalled for starring as "Erik the Phantom" in the now lost 1916 Ernst Matray-directed German adaptation Das Phantom der Oper, based on Gaston Leroux's novel The Phantom of the Opera opposite Norwegian actress Aud Egede-Nissen. Matray's version is the first film adaptation of Leroux's 1909–1910 serialized novel. In 1917, he appeared opposite the popular Polish film actress Pola Negri in her first role in a German production, Nicht lange täuschte mich das Glück. In 1919, he co-directed the German silent film Alraune und der Golem with actor and director Paul Wegener.

After performing in a film serial for director Karl Gerhardt opposite actress Lil Dagover from 1920 to 1921, Chrisander began his career in Germany as a director. In total, he directed three films in Germany, before relocating to the United States where he directed two dramatic films: 1927's Fighting Love, starring Jetta Goudal, Victor Varconi and Henry B. Walthall for Cecil B. DeMille Pictures, and that same year, The Heart Thief, starring Joseph Schildkraut and Lya De Putti.

By 1930, he was living at S. Gramercy Place in Los Angeles, California. He died in 1947 in Skurup, Sweden.

== Selected filmography ==
=== Actor ===
- Das Phantom der Oper (1916)
- The White Roses of Ravensberg (1919)
- The Hunt for Death (1920)

=== Director ===
- Alraune und der Golem (1919, co-director)
- The White Roses of Ravensberg (1919)
- Death the Victor (1920)
- Fighting Love (1927)
- The Heart Thief (1927)
