= Samuel Gottlieb Bürde =

German poet

Samuel Gottlieb Bürde (7 December 1753 – 28 April 1831) was a German poet.

== Life ==
Born in Breslau, Bürde was born the son of a church servant. In Breslau, he attended the Elisabet-Gymnasium; the headmaster there made Bürde aware of poetry. He studied law in Halle. from 1776 to 1778, he was a teacher at a school in Breslau. Later Bürde travelled through Switzerland and Italy. From 1781, he worked as a chamber secretary in his home town. In 1783, Bürde was appointed secretary of the Polish border commission and in 1795 secretary of the Silesian Ministry of Finance. Eleven years later he became director of the chamber and chancellery. Another nine years later, in 1815, he was a member of the royal court council.

Bürde died in Berlin at the age of 77.

== Work ==
- Translation of Paradise Lost
- Steil und dornig ist der Pfad, der uns zur Vollendung leitet
- Meines Herzens Freude ist nur die, daß ich nie mich von Jesus scheide
- Uns, die Gebundnen, zu befreien, der Unheilbaren Heil zu sein, ist er herabgekommen
- Wann der Herr einst die Gefangnen ihrer Bande ledig macht, o dann schwinden die vergangnen Leiden wie ein Traum der Nacht
- Wenn der Herr einst die Gefangnen (EG 298)
- Erzählung von einer gesellschaftlichen Reise durch einen Theil der Schweiz und des obern Italiens
