= Eufemia von Adlersfeld-Ballestrem =

German novelist (1854–1941)

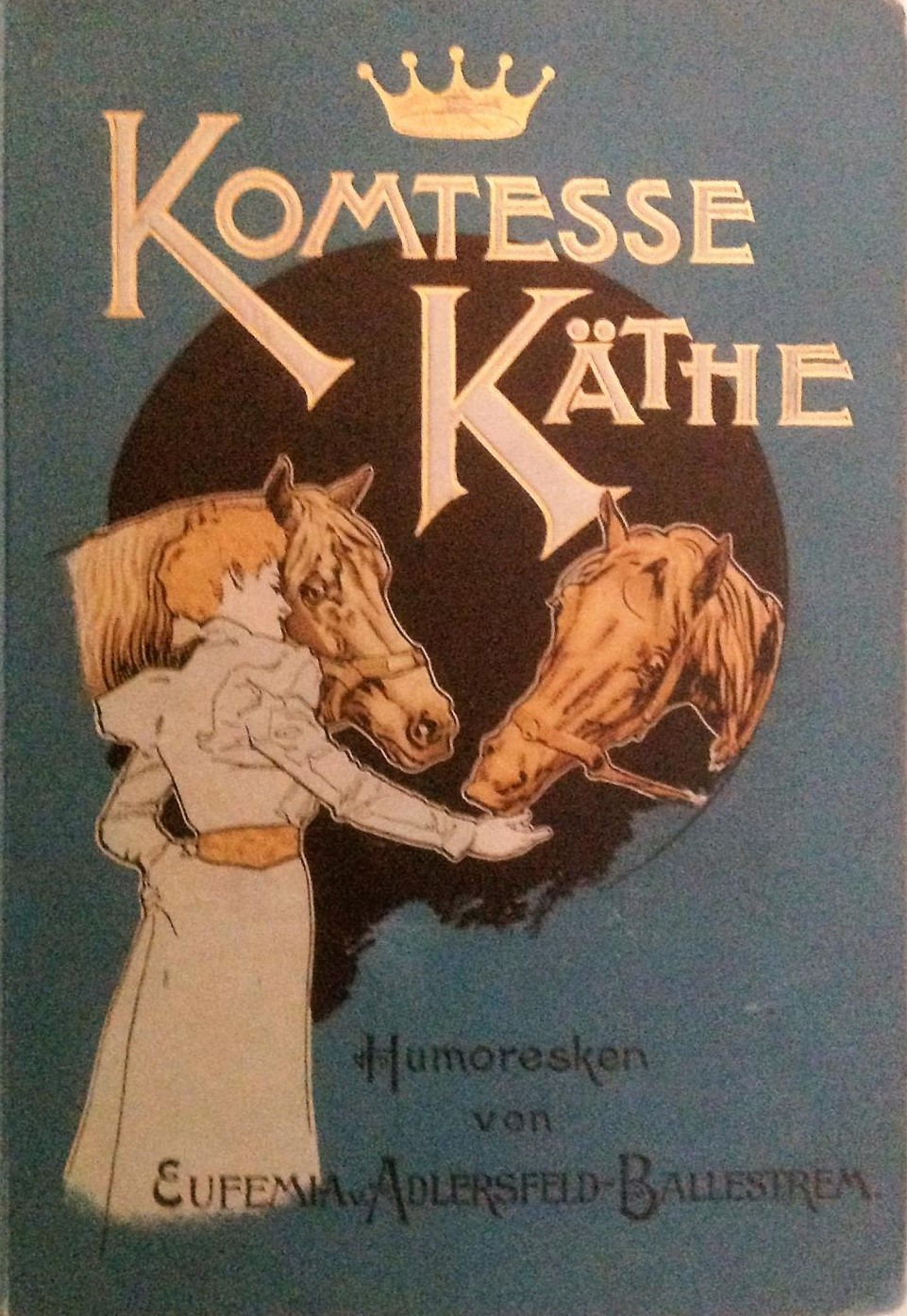
Eufemia von Adlersfeld-Ballestrem - Komtesse Käthe. Humoresken

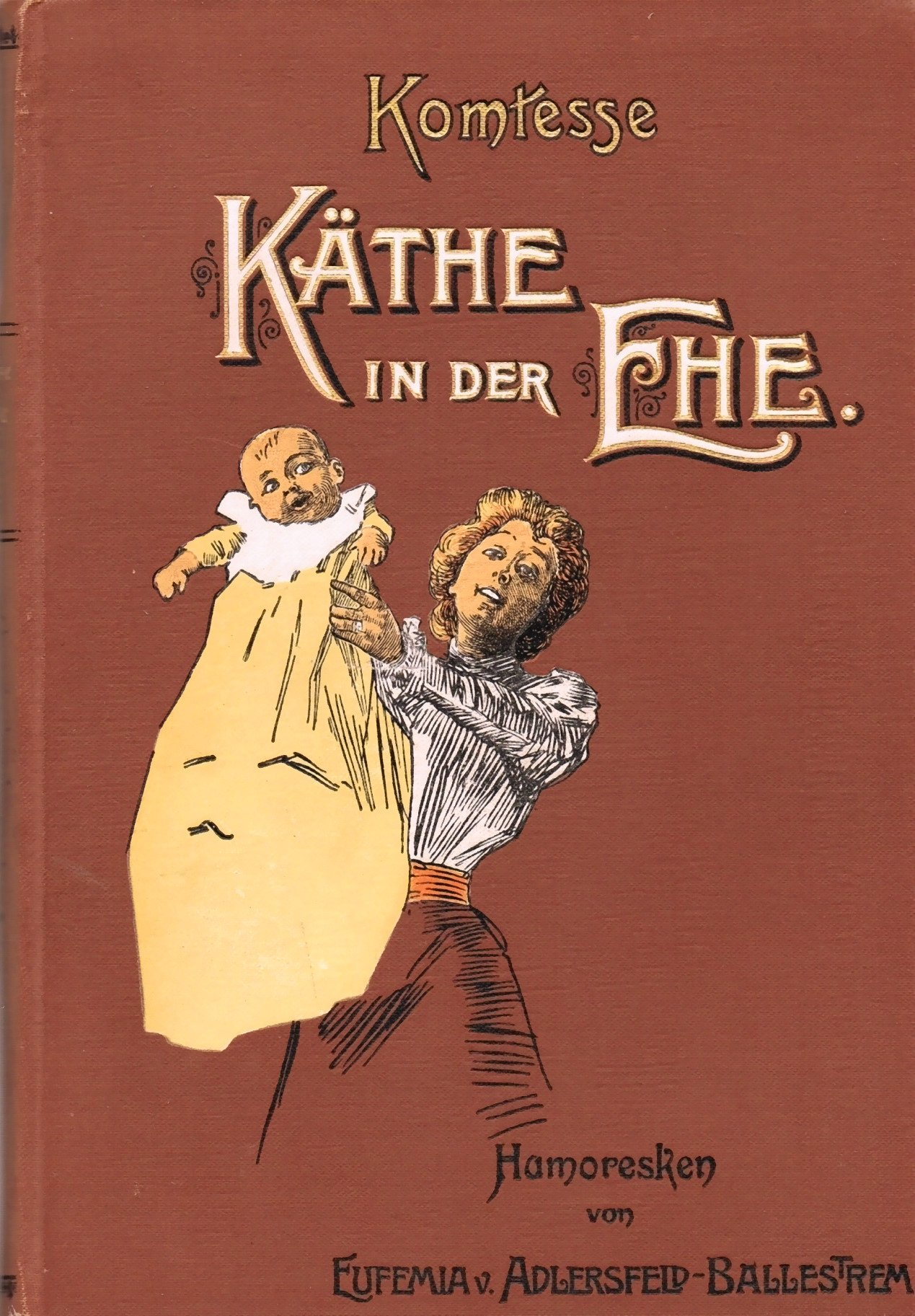
Eufemia von Adlersfeld-Ballestrem - Komtesse Käthe in der Ehe, 12. Auflage, um 1899

Anna Eufemia Carolina Gräfin von Adlersfeld-Ballestrem (18 August 1854 – 26 April 1941) was a German aristocratic novelist.

== Early life ==
She was born in Ratibor, Upper Silesia, as the daughter of Count Alexander von Ballestrem (1806-1881) and his wife, Mathilde von Hertell (1818-1900).

As a child, she had singing lessons from the Dresden soprano Jenny Bürde-Ney, and herself developed 'a beautiful soprano voice of rare proportions'.

She later settled in Munich. She was one of the few German female writers of the 19th century who did not use a pseudonym.

She married Joseph Fritz von Adlersfeld. They had one daughter:

- Dagmar Maria Josepha von Adlersfeld (b. 6 August 1885); married in 1909 to Albert von Bezold (b. 8 January 1869)

== Selected works ==
=== Short story collections ===
- 1876 Blätter im Winde (Leaves in the Wind) - Die Brillanten der Prinzessin (), Eine namenlose Geschichte (), Der Page des Kardinals (), Eine Überraschung, Orchidea ()
- 1876 Verschlungne Pfade (Winding Paths) - Jadviga (), Es fiel ein Reif in der Frühlingsnacht (), Die wilde Margareth (), Ein Opfer (), Sal viola ()
- 1883 Aus tiefem Borne (From Deep Sources) - Zigeunerblut; Sauve qui peut (), Eine gebrochene Rose (), Am Kamin (), Die blasse Lady (), Das sprechende Portrait (), Tannhäuser (), Es war ein Traum (), Der Brautschmuck der Ahnfrau (), Dr. Dorothea Schlözer, Der Schleier der Maria Stuart ()
- 1886 Die Augen der Assunta und andere Novellen (The Eyes of the Assunta and other stories) - Die Augen der Assunta, Titania – eine Künstlergeschichte, Ein verklungenes Lied, Der Schatten des Adlers ()
- 1889 Sol und andere Novellen (Sol and other stories) - Sol, In der Fremde gefunden, Juno Ludovisi, Donna Virginia ()
- 1889 Datura Sanguinea und andere Novellen (Datura Sanguinea and other stories) - Datura sanguinea, Das Geheimnis der Seealm, Der Ring der Maria Stuart ()
- 1890 Um eine Königskrone und andere Novellen (About a Royal Crown and other stories) - Um eine Königskrone, Eine Zaren-Idylle, Dieudonnee, La Traviata, Die weiße Dame, Beate, Feuilletons, Lady Iris ()
- 1890 Komtesse Käthe. Humoresken (Countess Käthe. Humoresques) Quarks Lieblingsname, Der Bärenführer, Syndetikon ()
- 1891 Lanzen gefällt zur Attaque. Heitere Geschichten (Countess Käthe in marriage. Humoresques) - Felddienstübungen, Einquartierung, Porte bonheur, Comtesse Hans, Auf Remontecommando, Das Pedigree der Butterfrau ()
- 1897 Pommery & Greno und andere Kuckucksnester-Geschichten. Militärhumoresken (Lances like to attack. Funny stories) - Pommery & Greno, Murks, Der Hirsepopel, Heureka, Schauzels Rache, Die Häßliche und die Diagonale ()
- 1890 Komtesse Käthe in der Ehe. Humoresken (Pommery & Greno and other cuckoo's nest stories. Military humour) - Tante Kukis Hochzeitsgeschenk, Die Anna, Also spricht Zarathustra ()
- 1899 Windbeutel und andere heitere Geschichten (Cream puffs and other funny stories) - Windbeutel, Wie der Berger-Karle zu seiner Frau kam, August Paddemanns einziger Wunsch, Ein Ritt um Tod und Leben ()
- 1901 Pension Malepartus, eine ganz verrückte Geschichte (Pension Malepartus, a crazy story)
- 1903 Die blonde Ida und andere Humoresken (The blonde Ida and other humoresques) - Die blonde Ida, Eine geniale Idee, Odysseus und Penelope, Pech ()
- 1904 Tiere und Menschen. Heitere Geschichten (Animals and people. Funny stories) - Glänzend gesiegt!, L'Aiglon, Lump und Schuft, Tiddlywinks, Donner und Doria! ()
- 1905 Zigeunerblut und andere Novellen (Gypsy Blood and other stories) - Zigeunerblut (Gypsy Blood), Eine gebrochene Rose, Die blasse Lady, Das sprechende Portrait ()
- 1905 Major Fuchs auf Reisen. Der "Pension Malepartus" anderer Teil. Tragikomische Erlebnisse (Major Fuchs on the road. The "Pension Malepartus" other part. Tragicomic experiences)
- 1905 Tannhäuser und andere Novellen (Tannhäuser and other stories) - Tannhäuser, Es war ein Traum, Der Brautschmuck der Ahnfrau, Dr. Dorothea Schlözer, Der Schleier der Maria Stuart ()
- 1907 Y.Z.100 und andere Humoresken (YZ100 and other humoresques) - Y.Z.100, Der Schimpfzettel, Die verhexte 'Alpenrose', So geht's zu! ()
- 1925 Harzveilchen und andere ulkige Gewächse Sonnemann, Halle (The Guy and the Others. A highly suspicious story) - Harzveilchen, Thilo, Die Hammelsucht, Rote Rosen, Ein Tag bei Geheimrats, Er ist's, Im Nebel ()
- 1925 Der Kerl und die Anderen. Eine höchst verdächtige Geschichte (Resin violets and other strange plants) - Der Kerl und die Anderen, Eine höchst verdächtige Geschichte, Das hysterische Halsband und die Katzenpfote, Boxbart versus Aschau ()

=== Crime and romance novels ===
- 1878 Lady Melusine
- 1878 Das Erbe der zweiten Frau. Eine Familiengeschichte (The legacy of the second wife . A family story)
- 1880 Haideröslein
- 1883 Violet
- 1889 Die blonden Frauen von Ulmenried (The blonde women of Ulmenried)
- 1890 Die Falkner vom Falkenhof (The falconers from Falkenhof)
- 1896 Die weißen Rosen von Ravensberg (The White Roses of Ravensberg)
- 1902 Halali
- 1902 Der Fall Stachelberg (The Stachelberg case)
- 1903 Trix
- 1906 Die Fürstäbtissin (The Princess Abbess)
- 1906 Der Spiegel der Lukrezia Borgia (The Mirror of Lucrezia Borgia)
- 1910 Ihre Majestät (Your Majesty)
- 1911 Schloß Monrepos (Monrepos Castle)
- 1913 Der grüne Pompadour (The green Pompadour)
- 1918 Der Amönenhof (The Amönenhof)
- 1919 Die Rechnung ohne den Wirt (Counting the chickens before they hatch)
- 1922 Die Nichte aus Florida (The niece from Florida)
- 1922 Espe, eines Königtraumes (Espe, a king's dream)
- 1924 Die Herzogin von Santa Rosa (The Duchess of Santa Rosa)
- 1924 Chrysantis Oleander (Chrysanthemum Oleander)
- 1925 Die Gründe des Doktor Pompeo Carcioffi (The reasons of Doctor Pompeo Carcioffi)
- 1926 Der Maskenball in der Ca' Torcelli (The masked ball at Ca' Torcelli)
- 1926 Der Skarabaeus (The Scarab)
- 1928 Der Dritte (The third)
- 1932 Die Spinne, das Netz, und Anneliese Holderbusch (The spider, the web, and Anneliese Holderbusch)
- 1934 Die Siebenbuchener Erbschaft (The Siebenbuchen inheritance)
- 1935 Warum keine Glyzinen? (Why no wisteria?)
- 1938 Schwarze Opale (Black Opals)

==== Detective Windmiller Series ====
1. 1906 Djavahir
2. 1906 Lucifers Träne (Lucifer's Tear)
3. 1907 Diplomaten. Ein Roman in 45 Stunden (Diplomats. A novel in 45 hours)
4. 1912 Weiße Tauben (White Doves)
5. 1914 Das wogende Licht (The surging light)
6. 1916 Wenn der Teufel kutschiert (When the devil drives)
7. 1919 Die Fliege im Bernstein (The fly in amber)
8. 1920 Die Erbin von Lohberg (The heiress of Lohberg)
9. 1921 Die Wahrheit über Donna Centa (The truth about Donna Centa)
10. 1921 Windmüllergeschichten (Windmiller stories):
  1. Der Mann im Spiegel (The Man in the Mirror)
  2. Der große Kurfürst (The Great Elector)
  3. Junges Blut (Young Blood)
  4. Schoschnonüfoffofelnonasose
  5. Der kleine Finger (The Little Finger)
  6. Der Fall der keiner war (The Case That Wasn't One)
  7. Roccadiana
11. 1926 Das Rosazimmer. Venetianischer Roman (The Pink Room. Venetian)
12. 1929 Mit veilchenblauer Seide. Der linken Katzenauges und der Dame im blauen Kleid (With violet-blue silk. The left cat's eye and the lady in the blue dress)
13. 1931 Povera Farfalla (Armer Schmetterling) (Poor Butterfly)
14. 1933 Über Nacht (Overnight)
15. 1936 Das Zünglein an der Waage (The deciding factor)

=== Fantasy ===
==== Short story collections ====
- 1923 Im Zwielicht. Unheimliche Geschichten (In the twilight. Eerie stories) - Die Florentiner Laute (The Florentine Lute), Die Giustina des Dogen Nicolo da Ponte (The Giustina of Doge Nicolo da Ponte), Die Bettelprinzessin (The Beggar Princess), Zwischen Lipp' und Kelchesrand (Between the Lips and the Edge of the Chalice), Paulownia Imperialis, Warum? (Why?), Der arme Peter (The Poor Peter), Der Spiegel im Castell Tarquino (The Mirror in the Tarquino Castle), Das Neujahrsgespenst (The New Year's Ghost)

==== Novels ====
- 1904 Ca' Spada. Eine Tragödie aus dem alten und ein Mysterium aus dem modernen Venedig (Ca' Spada. A tragedy from ancient and a mystery from modern Venice)
- 1907 Maria Schnee
- 1908 Die Dame in Gelb (The Lady in Yellow)
- 1909 Der Jungfernturm (The Maiden's Tower)
- 1909 Palazzo Iràn (Iran Palace)
- 1910 Margarita Margaritarum. Der Roman einer Perle (The novel of a pearl)
- 1917 Ave (Hail)
- 1917 Die Erzählungen der Elf (The Tales of the 11) - Wie die Elf zusammenkamen (How the 11 came together), Der Spiegel des Aah-Hotpe (The mirror of Aah-Hotpe), Der Mann bei den Nothelfern (The man with the emergency helpers), Gebrannte Mandeln (Roasted almonds), Die gestreifte Nelke (The striped carnation), Ein Staatsgeheimnis (A state secret), Der berühmte Tafelaufsatz (The famous centrepiece), Zur Chronik der Burg in der grünen Au (The chronicle of the castle in the green meadow), Die Scheuerfrau von Buchensee (The scrubwoman of Buchensee), Der ruppige Löwe und der süße Bube (The gruff lion and the sweet boy), Der „Babylu“ (The “Babylu”), Der Johanniskäfer (The St. John's beetle), Wie von den Elf neun auseinandergingen und zwei zusammenblieben (How 9 of the 11 went their separate ways and 2 stayed together) - fix-up novel
- 1919 Die Fliege im Bernstein (The fly in amber)
- 1924 Die Herzogin von Santa Rosa (The Duchess of Santa Rosa)
- 1930 Gefüllte Datteln (Stuffed dates) Mit den sechs eingestreuten Spukgeschichten (with 6 interspersed ghost stories) Die Axt an der Wand (The Axe on the Wall), Heliotrop (Heliotrope), Im Scheechhaus (In the Sheek's House), Das offene Tor (The Open Gate), Drei weiße Rosen (3 White Roses), Die Fürstin von Otrobarrio (The Princess of Otrobarrio)

== Bibliography ==
- Prawer, S.S. Between Two Worlds: The Jewish Presence in German and Austrian Film, 1910–1933. Berghahn Books, 2007.
