= List of World War I films =

This is a list of World War I films.

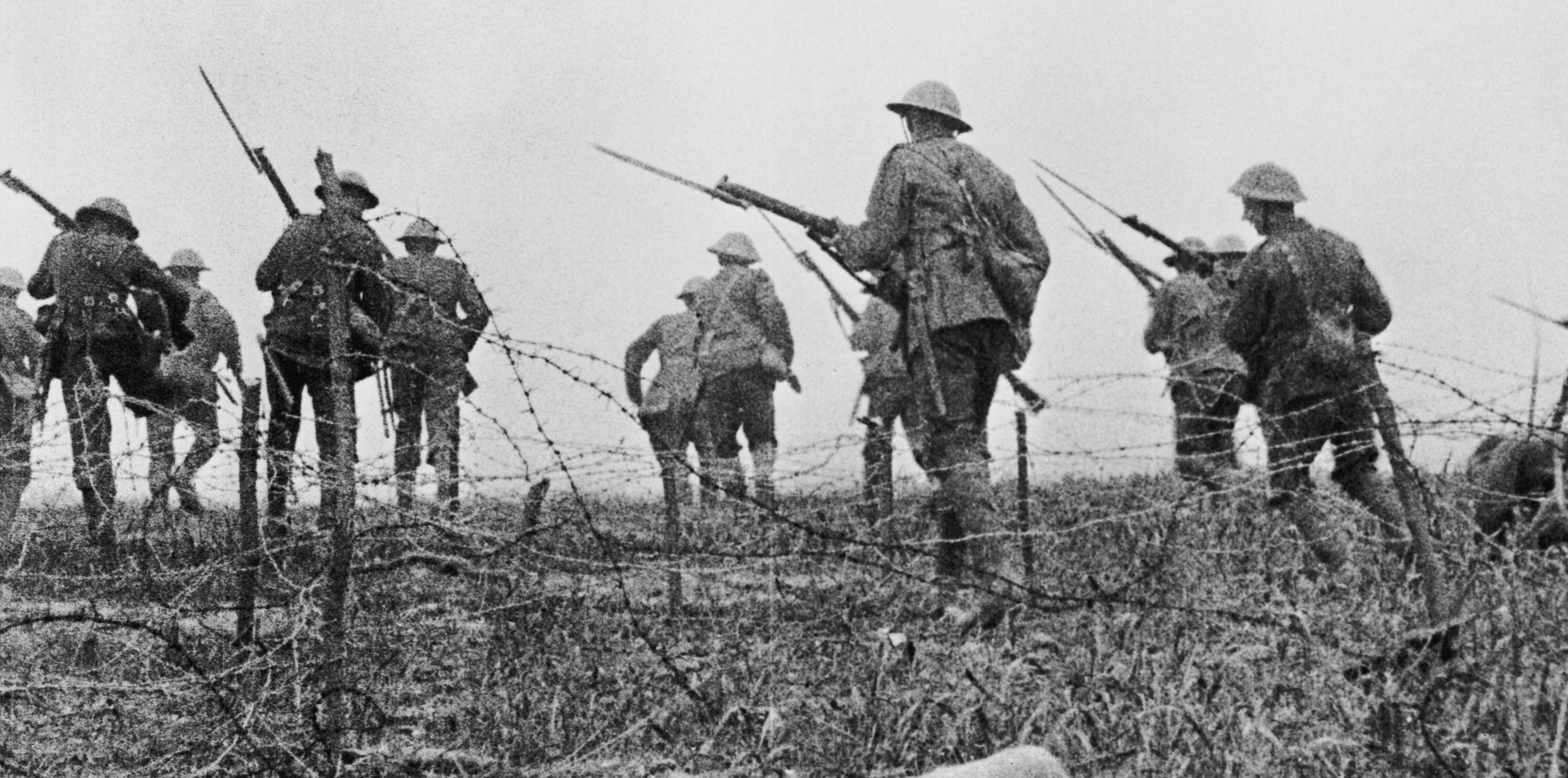
A staged scene from The Battle of the Somme

== Feature films ==
Year	Country	Main title (alternative title)	Original title (original script)	Director	Subject
1916	France	Alsace		Henri Pouctal	Alsatian family divided by Franco-German loyalties at the outbreak of World War I
1917	United States	The Little American		Cecil B. DeMille	An American woman falls in love with both a German and French soldier
1918	United States	Hearts of the World		D. W. Griffith	A young French couple are torn apart during the war
1918	United States	My Four Years in Germany		William Nigh	A biopic of James W. Gerard, the U.S. Ambassador to Germany
1918	United States	Shoulder Arms		Charlie Chaplin	Doughboy on the Western Front
1919	United States	The Lost Battalion		Burton L. King	The film follows the formation of the eponoymous Lost Battalion's formation and battle in October 1918 during the Meuse-Argonne Offensive and features some of the original soldiers as actors.
1919	United States	Yankee Doodle in Berlin		F. Richard Jones	Captain Bob White, an American pilot disguises himself as a woman in order to fool and steal an important map from Kaiser Wilhelm and the German Government
1919	France	J'accuse		Abel Gance	It follows a French soldier named François Laurin who enlisted in 1914 and is eventually consumed by the war.
1921	United States	The Four Horsemen of the Apocalypse		Rex Ingram	Argentinian family of mixed Franco-German heritage divided by the war's outbreak
1922	United States	Smilin' Through		Sidney Franklin	A man haunted by the ghost of his murdered fiancé, raises the fiancé's niece as his own. Once she's an adult, he tries to keep her from marrying the son of the man that killed his fiancé.
1925	United States	The Big Parade		King Vidor	US Army's Rainbow Division
1925	United States	The Dark Angel		George Fitzmaurice	After being blinded in WW1, a man disappears and becomes a famous author. Thinking he's dead, his friend tries to move in on his girl.
1925	United Kingdom	Ypres		Walter Summers	Battle reconstruction film of the several battles at Ypres.
1926	United States	The Better 'Ole		Charles Reisner	
1926	United States	What Price Glory?		Raoul Walsh	Rival United States Marines sergeants in France
1926	United Kingdom	Mons		Walter Summers	Battle reconstruction of the BEF 1914 retreat from Mons
1927	United Kingdom	Roses of Picardy		Maurice Elvey	In France, an ex-lieutenant returns to find his sweetheart is caring for a baron's blinded son.
1927	United States	Hotel Imperial		Mauritz Stiller	An Austrian officer separated from his army hides in the hotel of a frontier town occupied by the Russians with the help of the Hungarian chambermaid
1927	United States	Wings		William A. Wellman	Two American pilots on the Western Front
1927	United States	Barbed Wire		Rowland V. Lee	Anti-war romance. A French farm girl and a German POW fall in love.
1927	United States	Two Arabian Knights		Lewis Milestone	Two American soldiers are captured by the Germans on the Western Front and escape a POW camp only to stumble into further life-threatening adventures when they come across an Arabian king's daughter while on the lam.
1928	Canada	Carry on, Sergeant!		Bruce Bairnsfather	Canadian soldier and French waitress
1928	United Kingdom	Dawn		Herbert Wilcox	Nurse Edith Cavell
1928	United States	Four Sons		John Ford	Four Bavarian brothers, in the German and American armies
1928	United States	Finders Keepers		Wesley Ruggles & Otis B. Thayer	
1928	United States	The Legion of the Condemned		William A. Wellman	Four young men from various walks of life sign up for the Lafayette Escadrille, known as "The Legion of the Condemned"
1929	United Kingdom	Lost Patrol		Walter Summers	A British patrol is cornered at an oasis by enemy Arab tribesmen during the Mesopotamian campaign
1929	United States	She Goes to War		Henry King	A young woman disguises herself as a man and follows her fiancée into the trenches during World War I to find out what war is really like.
1930	United Kingdom	The W Plan		Victor Saville	A British spy helps prisoners of war destroy Germans during WW1
1930	United States	Journey's End		James Whale	British infantry on the Western Front
1930	United States	All Quiet on the Western Front		Lewis Milestone	German infantry on the Western Front
1930	United States	A Man from Wyoming		Rowland V. Lee	
1930	United States	Inside the Lines		Roy Pomeroy	During WW1, the paths of an officer in the English secret service and a German spy converge in Gibraltar.
1930	United States	Anybody's War		Lloyd Corrigan	Two blackfaced men and their dog get talked into joining WW1
1930	United States	The Dawn Patrol		Howard Hawks	RFC pilots on the Western Front
1930	United States	Doughboys		Edward Sedgwick	
1930	United States	Half Shot at Sunrise		Paul Sloane	MPs in Paris chase two AWOL doughboys posing as officers with the colonel's daughter.
1930	United States	Hell's Angels		Howard Hughes; Edmund Goulding (uncredited); James Whale (uncredited)	RFC pilots on the Western Front
1930	United States	War Nurse		Edgar Selwyn	Women from various backgrounds volunteer as nurses in France at the outbreak of World War I
1930	Weimar Republic	Westfront 1918	Vier von der Infanterie	Georg Wilhelm Pabst	German infantry on the Western Front
1931	United States	Seas Beneath		John Ford	USN mystery ship seeks German U-boat
1931	United States	Dishonored		Josef von Sternberg	Espionage
1931	United States	Born to Love		Paul L. Stein	A war officer who is thought dead returns to the woman he loves, only to find she has remarried.
1931	United States	A Woman of Experience	The Registered Woman	Harry Joe Brown	During World War I, a woman is rejected for volunteer work because of her dubious reputation, but that same reputation gets her recruited as a spy for Austria.
1931	United States	Chances		Allan Dwan	Two brothers on leave, fall for the same girl in World War I London.
1931	United States	The Gay Diplomat		Richard Boleslawski	A Russian captain frequents drawing rooms of WW1 Bucharest to find a female spy.
1931	United States	The Last Flight		William Dieterle	After World War I, three pilots suffering from shell shock, band together in Paris. Feeling they have no future, the men are constantly drunk. They meet and invite a wealthy but aimless woman into their group.
1931	United States	Waterloo Bridge		James Whale	Soldier meets chorus girl turned prostitute in London during an air raid.
1931	United States	Mata Hari		George Fitzmaurice	Spy Mata Hari
1931	Weimar Republic	Hell on Earth	Niemandsland	Victor Trivas	Soldiers from opposing sides trapped together.
1931	Weimar Republic	Mountains on Fire	Berge in Flammen	Karl Hartl; Luis Trenker	An Italian and an Austrian climbers find themselves fighting on different sides
1932	France	Wooden Crosses	Les Croix de bois	Raymond Bernard	
1932	United States	Cock of the Air		Tom Buckingham	An opera diva sets her sights on a womanizing Army officer.
1932	United States	Sky Devils	Ground Hogs	Edward Sutherland & Busby Berkeley	Draft dodger blunders into a warzone
1932	United States	Pack Up Your Troubles		George Marshall; Raymond McCarey	
1932	United States	Smilin' Through		Sidney Franklin	A man haunted by the ghost of his murdered fiancé, raises the fiancé's niece as his own. Once she's an adult, he tries to keep her from marrying the son of the man that killed his fiancé.
1932	United States	A Farewell to Arms		Frank Borzage	American soldier and British nurse
1932	United States	Rasputin and the Empress		Richard Boleslawski	Grigori Rasputin
1932	Weimar Republic	Cruiser Emden	Kreuzer Emden	Louis Ralph	SMS Emden
1932	Weimar Republic; Switzerland	Tannenberg	Tannenberg	Heinz Paul	The Battle of Tannenberg
1933	United States	Private Jones		Russell Mack	An unwilling American is drafted to fight Germans after the US enters the war in 1917.
1933	United States	Today We Live		Howard Hawks; Richard Rosson	A naval officer and an aviator compete for the same beautiful young woman.
1933	United States	The Eagle and the Hawk		Stuart Walker	Film follows two rival fighter pilots as one of them starts to crack and pays the price for glory.
1933	United States	Hell Below	Pigboats	Jack Conway	Submarine warfare on the Adriatic Sea.
1933	United States	Storm at Daybreak		Richard Boleslawski	Romance and intrigue in a Hungarian town with a Serbian mayor, from the assassination of the Archduke to the aftermath of the war.
1933	United States	Captured!		Roy Del Ruth	Allied soldiers in a German POW camp
1933	United States	Ace of Aces		J. Walter Ruben	The film explores how war can turn a man's moral compass from pacifism to warmonger.
1933	United States	After Tonight		George Archainbaud	A Russian spy and an Austrian captain fall in love during WW1.
1933	United States	Ever in My Heart		Archie Mayo	Romance and espionage in WW1
1934	United States	The Lost Patrol		John Ford	Remake of Lost Patrol
1934	United States	Keep 'Em Rolling	Rodney	George Archainbaud	WW1 Doughboy disobeys orders to save the condemned cavalry horse that saved his life.
1934	United States	Stamboul Quest		Sam Wood	During the First World War, a woman doctor falls in love with one of her patients who turns out to be a German spy. She herself ends up working for German intelligence.
1934	United States	The World Moves On		John Ford	
1935	United Kingdom	Brown on Resolution		Walter Forde; Anthony Asquith	Story of heroism in the Navy during World War I. A captain's illegitimate son holds a German cruiser at bay with a rifle.
1935	United States	The Dark Angel		Sidney A. Franklin	After being blinded in WW1, a man disappears and becomes a famous author. Thinking he's dead, the girl he loves marries his cousin.
1935	United States	The Last Outpost		Charles Barton; Louis J. Gasnier	
1935	United States	Rendezvous		William K. Howard	Espionage
1936	United Kingdom	Secret Agent		Alfred Hitchcock	Espionage
1936	United States	Sons O' Guns		Lloyd Bacon	Theatre actor with no desire to fight in WW1, fakes enlisting to impress his fiancée. Unbeknownst to him, he actually enlists.
1936	United States	Suzy		George Fitzmaurice	Espionage
1936	United States	The Road to Glory		Howard Hawks	Remake of Les Croix de bois, trench warfare on the Western Front
1937	France	Grand Illusion	La Grande Illusion	Jean Renoir	Two French POWs plot their escape
1937	United Kingdom	A Romance in Flanders	Lost on the Western Front	Maurice Elvey	Set during the First World War with the British Expeditionary Force in Flanders.
1937	United Kingdom	Under Secret Orders	Mademoiselle Docteur	Edmond T. Gréville	During the First World War, a woman doctor falls in love with one of her patients who turns out to be a German spy. She herself ends up working for German intelligence.
1937	United States	Street of Shadows	Mademoiselle Docteur	G. W. Pabst	During the First World War, a woman doctor falls in love with one of her patients who turns out to be a German spy. She herself ends up working for German intelligence.
1937	United States	They Gave Him a Gun		W. S. Van Dyke	Jimmy is drafted in Fred's troop in WW1 and becomes vicious with his gun, wins a medal, then weds Fred's nurse girlfriend, Rose. Years later after the war, Rose discovers Jimmy is a gangster, has him arrested, and finds a job in Fred's circus as Jimmy escapes, determined to kill Fred.
1937	United States	The Road Back		James Whale	How German soldiers struggle with life in post-war Germany.
1938	United States	The Shopworn Angel		H. C. Potter	Shortly after the United States enters World War I in 1917, a Broadway actress agrees to let a naive soldier court her in order to impress his friends, but a real romance soon begins.
1938	United States	Alexander's Ragtime Band		Henry King	
1938	United States	Block-Heads		John G. Blystone	
1938	United States	Men with Wings		William A. Wellman	US pilot on the Western Front
1938	United States	The Dawn Patrol		Edmund Goulding	RFC pilots on the Western Front
1938	France	J'accuse		Abel Gance	A remake of the 1919 original. It follows a French soldier named François Laurin who enlisted in 1914 and is eventually consumed by the war.
1939	United States	Hotel Imperial		Robert Florey	In a frontier town alternatively occupied by the Austrians and the Russians, a Polish woman joins a hotel as a maid to seek revenge on the Austrian officer that caused her sister's suicide.
1939	United States	Nurse Edith Cavell		Herbert Wilcox	True story of an English nurse caught up in the horrors of the First World War. Working in a Brussels hospital, Edith Cavell becomes sympathetic to the plight of the Belgians. So appalled is she by the German conquerors that she becomes involved with a secret underground resistance movement.
1939	United States	The Roaring Twenties		Raoul Walsh	
1939	United Kingdom	The Spy in Black		Michael Powell	Espionage
1940	United States	The Fighting 69th		William Keighley	New York City's 69th Regiment, with Donovan (OSS) and Kilmer (poet)
1940	United States	The Great Dictator		Charlie Chaplin	Jewish barber on the Western Front
1940	United States	Waterloo Bridge		Mervyn LeRoy	Soldier meets chorus girl turned prostitute in London during an air raid.
1941	United States	Sergeant York		Howard Hawks	Sgt. Alvin York
1942	United States	Yankee Doodle Dandy		Michael Curtiz	George M. Cohan
1942	United States	For Me and My Gal		Busby Berkeley	
1943	United Kingdom	The Life and Death of Colonel Blimp		Michael Powell; Emeric Pressburger	
1943	United States	This Is the Army		Michael Curtiz	
1944	United States	Wilson		Henry King	President Woodrow Wilson
1951	United Kingdom; United States	The African Queen		John Huston	War in German East Africa
1951	Italy	The Caiman of the Piave ^{†}	Il caimano del Piave	Giorgio Bianchi	Espionage on the front of the Piave river in 1918
1951	Italy	Without a Flag	Senza bandiera	Lionello De Felice	Italian agents discover an Austrian spy ring in Zürich
1952	Italy	Brothers of Italy	Fratelli d'Italia	Fausto Saraceni	Nazario Sauro, Istrian Italian, fights against Austria
1952	United States	What Price Glory		John Ford	American infantry on the Western Front
1953	United States	The Royal African Rifles		Lesley Selander	British East Africa
1954	Italy	Woe to the Vanquished Ones ^{†}	Guai ai vinti	Raffaello Matarazzo	Austrian occupation troops mistreat Italian women
1955	United States	East of Eden		Elia Kazan	American home front
1955	Czechoslovakia	The Good Soldier Schweik		Jiří Trnka	Animated adaptation of The Good Soldier Švejk
1956	Czechoslovakia	The Good Soldier Schweik		Karel Steklý	Adaptation of The Good Soldier Švejk
1957	United States	A Farewell to Arms		Charles Vidor, John Huston (uncredited)	American soldier and British nurse
1957	United States	Paths of Glory		Stanley Kubrick	French infantry on the Western Front
1958	Czechoslovakia	I Dutifully Report		Karel Steklý	Sequel to The Good Soldier Schweik
1959	Italy	The Great War	La Grande Guerra	Mario Monicelli	The story of an odd couple of army buddies in World War I
1962	United Kingdom; United States	Lawrence of Arabia		David Lean	T. E. Lawrence and the Arab Revolt
1964	United Kingdom	King & Country		Joseph Losey	British soldier tried for desertion
1964	Yugoslavia	March on the Drina	Marš na Drinu (Марш на Дрину)	Žika Mitrović	Battle of Cer
1964	Romania	Forest of the Hanged	Pădurea spânzuraților	Liviu Ciulei	Romanian ethnic officer decorated in the Austro-Hungarian army is torn between remaining loyal to the Habsburgs or deserting to the Romanian Army
1966	United Kingdom	The Blue Max		John Guillermin	German fighter pilot on the Western Front
1966	France	King of Hearts	Le Roi de Coeur	Philippe de Broca	Inmates of an insane asylum take over a village abandoned during the war
1969	Italy; Yugoslavia	Fräulein Doktor	Fräulein Doktor	Alberto Lattuada	Elsbeth Schragmüller
1969	United Kingdom	Oh! What a Lovely War		Richard Attenborough	Satirical chronicle of the war
1970	United States	Darling Lili		Blake Edwards	German female spy in Paris
1970	Italy; Yugoslavia	Many Wars Ago	Uomini Contro	Francesco Rosi	Italian infantry on the Venetian front
1971	United States	Johnny Got His Gun		Dalton Trumbo	Plight of a seriously wounded soldier in a military hospital
1971	United States	Von Richthofen and Brown		Roger Corman	Air war on the Western Front
1971	United Kingdom	Zeppelin		Etienne Périer	British double agent
1976	United Kingdom	Aces High		Jack Gold	RFC on the Western Front
1976	France; Ivory Coast	Black and White in Color	Noirs et Blancs en Couleur	Jean-Jacques Annaud	Impact of the war on the native populations of Africa
1976	Australia	Break of Day		Ken Hannam	A wounded Gallipoli survivor returns to Australia
1976	United Kingdom	Shout at the Devil		Peter R. Hunt	War in East Africa
1981	Australia	Gallipoli		Peter Weir	Australian infantry in the Gallipoli campaign
1981	Romania; East Germany	Mercenaries' Trap	Capcana mercenarilor	Sergiu Nicolaescu	Romanian Army in Romanian Front
1982	Italy	Porca vacca		Pasquale Festa Campanile	Love, Scams and War on the Italian Front
1983	Canada	The Wars		Robin Phillips	Canadian soldier on the Western Front
1985	United States	Mata Hari		Curtis Harrington	Spy Mata Hari
1987	Australia	The Lighthorsemen		Simon Wincer	Australian cavalry in the Battle of Beersheba (1917)
1987	Soviet Union	Moonzund	Moonzund (Моонзунд)	Valentin Pikul	Russian Captain and German female spy during the Battle of Moon Sound
1989	France	Life and Nothing But	La vie et rien d'autre	Bertrand Tavernier	Identification of French soldiers missing in action after the war
1992	New Zealand	Chunuk Bair		Dale G. Bradley	Wellington Regiment at the Battle of Gallipoli
1992	Wales	Hedd Wyn		Paul Turner	Welsh poet Ellis Evans (Hedd Wyn) killed at the Battle of Passchendaele
1994	United States	Legends of the Fall		Edward Zwick	Montana family during the early 20th century
1996	Italy	The Border	La Frontiera	Franco Giraldi	Italian officer from Dalmatia deserts the Austrian Army, but is captured and executed
1996	France	Captain Conan	Capitaine Conan	Bertrand Tavernier	French occupation troops in Southeastern Europe after the surrender of Bulgaria
1996	United States	In Love and War		Richard Attenborough	Ernest Hemingway and Agnes von Kurowsky
1997	United Kingdom	Regeneration		Gillies MacKinnon	Siegfried Sassoon
1999	United Kingdom; France	The Trench		William Boyd	British soldiers at the Battle of the Somme
2000	United States	The Legend of Bagger Vance		Robert Redford	
2004	France	A Very Long Engagement	Un long dimanche de fiançailles	Jean-Pierre Jeunet	Parallel story of a French soldier MIA and his fiancée in rural Brittany
2004	United States	Company K		Robert Clem	American veteran writes about the company in which he served
2005	Belgium; France; Germany; Romania; United Kingdom	Joyeux Noël	Merry Christmas	Christian Carion	Christmas truce of 1914
2006	United States	Flyboys		Tony Bill	The Lafayette Escadrille
2008	Russia	Admiral	Admiral (Адмиралъ)	Andrey Kravchuk	Alexander Kolchak
2008	United Kingdom	Einstein and Eddington		Philip Martin	Development of the theory of relativity
2008	Spain	Flying Heroes / The Aviators	Cher Ami... ¡y yo!	Miquel Pujol	Animated film. Cher Ami is sent to help an American battalion trapped behind enemy lines.
2008	United States	Haber		Daniel Ragussis	Fritz Haber
2008	Turkey	120	120	Özhan Eren	Children supplying munition to the Ottoman troops during the Battle of Sarikamish
2008	Canada	Passchendaele		Paul Gross	Canadian infantry on the Western Front, and the Crucified Soldier
2008	Germany; United Kingdom; United States	The Red Baron		Nikolai Müllerschön	Baron Manfred von Richthofen
2009	Serbia	St. George Shoots the Dragon	Sveti Georgije ubiva aždahu (Свети Георгије убива аждаху)	Srđan Dragojević	Battle of Cer
2009	Germany; Austria; France; Italy	The White Ribbon	Das weisse Band – Eine deutsche Kindergeschichte (in German)	Michael Haneke	Mysterious happenings in a German village in the lead up to the war
2010	Australia	Beneath Hill 60		Jeremy Sims	Oliver Woodward
2010	Turkey	Veda		Zülfü Livaneli	Salih Bozok with the trace of life with Mustafa Kemal
2011	Croatia	Josef	Josef	Stanislav Tomić	Croat soldier in the Austro-Hungarian Army
2011	United States; United Kingdom	War Horse		Steven Spielberg	Devon youth and his horse on the Western Front
2012	Turkey	Canakkale 1915 ^{†}	Çanakkale 1915	Yesim Sezgin	Dardanelles campaign and the ensuing Gallipoli campaign, as seen from the Turkish side.
2012	United Kingdom	Private Peaceful		Pat O'Connor	Devon Set in the fields of Devon and the WW1 battlefields of Flanders, two brothers fall for the same girl while contending with the pressures of their feudal family life, the war, and the price of courage and cowardice.
2013	Turkey	The Long Way Home	Eve Dönüş: Sarıkamış 1915	Alphan Eşeli	Family during the Battle of Sarikamish
2013	Australia	Forbidden Ground		John Earl; Adrian Powers	Three British soldiers stranded in no man's land
2013	Turkey	Gallipoli: End of the Road	Çanakkale: Yolun Sonu	Kemal Uzun	Turkish sniper during the Gallipoli campaign
2014	Italy	Greenery Will Bloom Again	Torneranno i prati	Ermanno Olmi	War on the Asiago plateau at the end of 1917
2014	Jordan; United Kingdom; United Arab Emirates; Qatar	Theeb	Theeb (ذيب)	Naji Abu Nowar	A young Bedouin boy guides a British officer in a dangerous journey across the desert
2014	Austria; Italy; United States	The Silent Mountain	Der stille Berg(in German); La montagna silenziosa (in Italian)	Ernst Gossner	Austrian soldier fights his way through the Alps to rescue his love and escape the impending explosion that will rock the mountain
2014	United Kingdom	Testament of Youth		James Kent	Vera Brittain, an independent young woman who abandoned her Oxford studies to become a war nurse
2015	Russia	Battalion	Batal'on (Батальонъ)	Dmitry Meskhiev	1st Russian Women's Battalion of Death
2017	United Kingdom	Goodbye Christopher Robin		Simon Curtis	A. A. Milne
2017	United Kingdom	Journey's End		Saul Dibb	British infantry on the Western Front
2017	France	See You Up There	Au revoir là-haut	Albert Dupontel	Lieutenant Pradelle, by ordering a senseless assault, just before the end of the war, destroys lives of Edouard Pericourt and Albert Maillard, who mount a monumental scam after war for surviving
2018	India	Sajjan Singh Rangroot		Pankaj Batra	Indian infantry on the Western front
2018	United Kingdom	The Good Soldier Schweik		Christine Edzard	Adaptation of The Good Soldier Švejk
2019	United States; United Kingdom	Tolkien		Dome Karukoski	J. R. R. Tolkien
2019	United Kingdom	1917		Sam Mendes	Two young British soldiers, Schofield and Blake, are given a mission to cross enemy territory and deliver a message that will stop a deadly attack on hundreds of soldiers, including Blake's brother.
2019	Latvia	Blizzard of Souls	Dvēseļu putenis	Dzintars Dreibergs	A sixteen-year-old Latvian boy enlists in the national Latvian Riflemen battalions of the Imperial Russian Army to fight the Germans on the Eastern Front, but eventually becomes disillusioned and defects to take part in the Latvian War of Independence.
2021	United Kingdom	The War Below		J.P. Watts	During World War I, a group of British miners are recruited to tunnel underneath no man's land and set bombs from below the German front, in hopes of breaking the deadly stalemate of the Battle of Messines.
2022	United States; Germany	All Quiet on the Western Front	Im Westen nicht Neues (in German)	Edward Berger	Set in the closing years of World War I, it follows the life of German soldier Paul Bäumer who, after enlisting in the German Army with his friends, finds himself at risk to the realities of war, shattering their earliest hopes of becoming heroes.
2024	Belgium	The Last Front			
2025	United Kingdom	The History of Sound		Oliver Hermanus	

== Television films and series ==
Year	Country	Main title	Original title	Director	Subject
2004	Canada	A Bear Named Winnie		John Kent Harrison	Winnipeg the Bear
1974	United Kingdom	Fall of Eagles (miniseries)		John Elliot (creator)	The Habsburgs, the Hohenzollerns and the Romanovs to 1918
1976	United States	Once an Eagle (miniseries)		Richard Michaels, E. W. Swackhamer	Two US Army officers
1977	United Kingdom	Wings		Jim Goddard; Gareth Davis; Donald McWhinnie; Desmond Davis	Two British fighter pilots on the Western Front
1979	United States; United Kingdom	All Quiet on the Western Front	Im Westen nichts Neues	Delbert Mann	German infantry on the Western Front
1982	Australia	1915 (miniseries)		Di Drew, Chris Thomson	Two rural Australians join the ANZACs
1985	Australia	Anzacs (miniseries)		Pino Amenta, John Dixon, George Miller	Australian infantry in Europe
1986	Italy; West Germany	Mino (miniseries)	Mino - Il piccolo alpino(in Italian); Mino – Ein Junge zwischen den Fronten(in German)	Gianfranco Albano	Italian boy fights with the Alpini
1989	United Kingdom	Blackadder Goes Forth		Richard Boden	British soldiers in Flanders
1991	United States	Tales from the Crypt ""Yellow""		Robert Zemeckis	A US Army general does not wish his son to be seen as a coward
1992	United States	The Young Indiana Jones Chronicles "London, May 1916" (aired March 11)		Carl Schultz	Wartime London
1992	United States	The Young Indiana Jones Chronicles "Verdun, September 1916" (aired March 25)		Rene Manzor	The Battle of Verdun
1992	United States	The Young Indiana Jones Chronicles "German East Africa, December 1916" (aired April 1)		Simon Wincer	Colonial war in the Belgian Congo
1992	United States	The Young Indiana Jones Chronicles "Congo, January 1917" (aired April 8)		Simon Wincer	Albert Schweitzer in wartime Gabon
1992	United States	The Young Indiana Jones Chronicles "Austria, March 1917" (aired September 21)		Vic Armstrong	The Sixtus Affair
1992	United States	The Young Indiana Jones Chronicles "Somme, early August 1916" (aired September 28)		Simon Wincer	The Battle of the Somme
1992	United States	The Young Indiana Jones Chronicles "Germany, Mid-August 1916" (aired October 5)		Simon Wincer	Prison camps in Germany
1992	United States	The Young Indiana Jones Chronicles "Barcelona, May 1917" (aired October 12)		Terry Jones	Espionage in neutral Spain
1992	United States	Tom and Jerry Kids "Mouse with a Message" (aired November 29)		Sandy Fries	Pilot courier in the Western Front
1993	United States	The Young Indiana Jones Chronicles "Princeton, February 1916" (aired March 20)		Joe Johnston	German saboteurs in America
1993	United States	The Young Indiana Jones Chronicles "Petrograd, July 1917" (aired March 27)		Simon Wincer	Petrograd July Days
1993	United States	The Young Indiana Jones Chronicles "Northern Italy, June 1918" (aired April 17)		Bille August	Ernest Hemingway in the Italian front
1993	United States	The Young Indiana Jones Chronicles "Young Indiana Jones and the Phantom Train of Doom" (aired June 5)		Peter MacDonald	War in German East Africa, Paul von Lettow-Vorbeck
1993	United States	The Young Indiana Jones Chronicles "Ireland, April 1916" (aired June 12)		Gillies MacKinnon	The Easter Rising
1993	United States	The Young Indiana Jones Chronicles "Paris, October 1916" (aired July 10)		Nicolas Roeg	Spy Mata Hari
1993	United States	The Young Indiana Jones Chronicles "Istanbul, September 1918" (aired July 17)		Mike Newell	Espionage during the Fall of the Ottoman Empire
1993	United States	The Young Indiana Jones Chronicles "Paris, May 1919" (aired July 24)		David Hare	The Treaty of Versailles
1995	United States	The Young Indiana Jones Chronicles "Young Indiana Jones and the Treasure of the Peacock's Eye" (aired January 15)		Carl Schultz	Armistice with Germany (prologue)
1995	United States	The Young Indiana Jones Chronicles "Young Indiana Jones and the Attack of the Hawkmen" (aired October 8)		Ben Burtt	Air war on the Western Front
1995	United States	Truman		Frank Pierson	Harry S. Truman, US Army
1996	United States	The Young Indiana Jones Chronicles "Prague, August 1917" (unaired)		Robert Young	Espionage, Franz Kafka
1996	United States	The Young Indiana Jones Chronicles "Palestine, October 1917" and "Palestine 1917" (unaired)		Simon Wincer	The Battle of Beersheba
1996	United States	The Young Indiana Jones Chronicles "Morocco 1917" (unaired)		Michael Schultz	The Zaian Revolt
1999	United Kingdom; United States	All the King's Men		Julian Jarrold	The Sandringham Company
2000	Canada	Anne of Green Gables: The Continuing Story (miniseries)		Stefan Scaini	Canadian women during the war
2001	United States	The Lost Battalion		Russell Mulcahy	The Lost Battalion
2002	United States	The Man Who Saved Christmas		Sturla Gunnarsson	Alfred Carlton Gilbert
2003	United Kingdom	The Lost Prince		Stephen Poliakoff	Prince John
2005	Russia	The Fall of the Empire	Гибель Империи (Gibel Imperii)	Vladimir Khotinenko	The Russian Revolution
2007	Italy	Love and War^{†·}	L'amore e la guerra	Giacomo Campiotti	Inspired to Rudyard Kipling's The War in the Mountains and Ernest Hemingway's A Farewell to Arms
2007	United Kingdom	My Boy Jack		Brian Kirk	Rudyard Kipling's son Jack at the Battle of Loos
2007	Canada	The Great War		Brian McKenna	Canadian infantry on the Western Front
2009	Turkey	The Thoroughfare of Çanakkale^{†·}	Çanakkale Geçilmez		Gallipoli campaign: a flashbacks story between two friends (one has died)
2012	United Kingdom	Birdsong		Philip Martin	British officer recounts the days he spent with his lover before the war during the Battle of the Somme
2012	United Kingdom	Parade's End		Susanna White	
2014	United Kingdom	37 Days		Justin Hardy	The diplomatic negotiations leading to the First World War.
2014	New Zealand	Field Punishment No 1		Peter Burger	Four brothers who are conscientious objectors are deported to the front in France and successfully refuse military service and oppose military inhumanity even confronted with cruel field punishment
2014	Australia	ANZAC Girls			Australian women at the Western Front
2014	United Kingdom	The Crimson Field			A team of doctors, nurses and women volunteers work together in a tented field hospital to heal the bodies and souls of men wounded in the Great War.
2014	United Kingdom	Our World War			British forces in WWI
2014	United Kingdom; Poland	The Passing Bells		Brendan Maher	The series operates in parallel as it follows two teenagers in two countries, one German and one British, who sign up as soldiers at the outbreak of the First World War.
2015	Australia	Deadline Gallipoli		Michael Rymer	The Gallipoli campaign from the point of view of war correspondents Charles Bean, Ellis Ashmead-Bartlett, Phillip Schuler and Keith Murdoch.
2015	Australia	Gallipoli		Glendyn Ivin	The series centres on 17-year-old Thomas "Tolly" Johnson, who lies about his age so he may enlist with his brother Bevan and ends up fighting at Gallipoli in the campaign that helped create the ANZAC legend.
2015	France	Deserters	Les fusillés	Philippe Triboit	The adventure of two men as they struggle to prove their innocence in front of the firing line during the Great War

== Science fiction and fantasy ==
Year	Country	Main title (alternative title)	Original title (original script)	Director	Subject
1960	United States	The Twilight Zone "The Last Flight" (1960 episode)		William Claxton	A World War I pilot travels through time to 1959
1964	United States	A Carol for Another Christmas		Joseph L. Mankiewicz	Daniel Grudge fought in World War I
1969	United Kingdom	Doctor Who "The War Games" (1969 episode)		David Maloney	The Doctor and his companions end up in World War I
1986	United Kingdom	Biggles		John Hough	A 20th-century salesman time-travels back to 1917 and meets pilot Biggles
1986	United States	The Twilight Zone "The Convict's Piano" (1986 episode)		Thomas J. Wright	A convict time travels through time by playing music from that era, including a brief stop in World War I
1995	United States	12 Monkeys		Terry Gilliam	Bruce Willis plays time traveler Cole, who is briefly transported into a French military offensive during the war
1995	United States	Demon Knight		Ernest Dickerson	Recurring flashbacks to WWI trench warfare, where a character in the US Army acquired a holy artifact
1996	United States	The Young Indiana Jones Chronicles "Transylvania, January 1918" (unaired episode)		Dick Maas	Indiana Jones runs into a Romanian general who might be a vampire
2002	United Kingdom	Deathwatch		Michael J. Bassett	British soldiers find a demonic being in a captured German trench
2009	Japan	Hetalia: Axis Powers	Hetalia: Axis Powers (ヘタリア Axis Powers)	Bob Shirohata	A comedy/satire in which countries have human forms - the first few episodes denote interactions between Germany and Italy during and after World War I
2017	Japan	The Saga of Tanya the Evil (anime series)	Yōjo Senki (幼女戦記)	Yutaka Uemura	A murdered salaryman is reborn as a young girl who goes on to fight in a magical alternate universe World War I
2017	United States	Wonder Woman		Patty Jenkins	Diana Prince fights in World War I
2017	Canada	Trench 11		Leo Scherman	Allied soldiers investigate a German trench that turns out to contain zombies
2017	United Kingdom	Doctor Who "Twice Upon a Time" (2017 episode)		Rachel Talalay	Partly set just before the Christmas Truce
2019	Japan	Saga of Tanya the Evil: The Movie	Gekijōban Yōjo Senki (劇場版 幼女戦記)	Yutaka Uemura	Sequel to the 2017 television series
2025	United States	V13		Richard Ledes	Inspired by the year Hitler and Freud were in Vienna in 1913

== Documentary ==
Year	Country	Main title	Original title	Director	Subject
1916	United Kingdom	The Battle of the Somme		Geoffrey Malins; John McDowell	British Army at the Battle of the Somme, 1916
1918	United States	The Sinking of the Lusitania		Winsor McCay	Animated. Sinking of the RMS Lusitania
2005	Turkey	Gallipoli	Gelibolu	Tolga Örnek	The Gallipoli campaign, as told by soldiers on both sides
2014	France	Apocalypse: World War I	Apocalypse, la Première Guerre mondiale	Daniel Costelle Isabelle Clarke	
2018	New Zealand; United Kingdom	They Shall Not Grow Old		Peter Jackson	

== Derived conflicts ==
=== Anglo-Irish War and Irish Civil War ===
Year	Country	Main title	Original title	Director	Subject
1941	Nazi Germany	My Life for Ireland	Mein Leben für Irland	Max W. Kimmich	The son of an Irish rebel is sent to an English boarding school for re-education
2006	Ireland; United Kingdom	The Wind That Shakes the Barley		Ken Loach	Two Cork brothers join the IRA

=== Russian Revolution and Russian Civil War ===
Year	Country	Main title (alternative title)	Original title (original script)	Director	Subject
1927	United States	Mockery		Benjamin Christensen	
1928	Soviet Union	October: Ten Days That Shook the World (October)	Oktyabr': Desyat' dney kotorye potryasli mir (Октябрь (Десять дней, которые потрясли мир))	Sergei Eisenstein, Grigori Aleksandrov	October Revolution of 1917
1929	Soviet Union	Arsenal	Arsenal (Арсенал) / Yanvarskoye vosstaniye v Kiyeve v 1918 godu (Январское восстание в Киеве в 1918 году)	Alexander Dovzhenko	Kiev Arsenal January Uprising in 1918
1934	Soviet Union	Chapaev	Chapaev (Чапаев)	Georgi Vasilyev, Sergei Vasilyev	Red Army hero Vasily Chapayev
1934	United States	British Agent		Michael Curtiz	Espionage
1937	United Kingdom	Knight Without Armour (Knight Without Armor)		Jacques Feyder	British agent saves Russian countess from the Bolsheviks
1939	Soviet Union	Shchors	Shchors (Щорс)	Alexander Dovzhenko, Yuliya Solntseva	Partisan leader Nikolay Shchors
1958	Soviet Union	And Quiet Flows the Don	Tikhii Don (Тихий Дон)	Sergei Gerasimov	Don Cossack village between 1912 and 1922
1965	United States; United Kingdom	Doctor Zhivago		David Lean	Romantic epic based on Boris Pasternak's novel
1967	Hungary; Soviet Union	The Red and the White	Csillagosok, katonák	Miklós Jancsó	Hungarian Communist volunteers in the Russian Civil War
1970	Soviet Union	White Sun of the Desert	Beloye solntse pustyni (Белое солнце пустыни)	Vladimir Motyl	The Basmachi revolt
1981	United States	Reds		Warren Beatty	John Reed
1992	Russia; France	The Chekist	Chekist (Чекист)	Aleksandr Rogozhkin	The bloody work and downfall of a Soviet Cheka security official involved in mass executions during the Russian Civil War
2005	Russia	Nine Lives of Nestor Makhno (miniseries)	Devyat zhizney Nestora Makhno (Девять жизней Нестора Махно)	Nikolai Kapta	Ukrainian anarchist Nestor Makhno

==== Grigori Rasputin ====
Year	Country	Main title	Original title (original script)	Director	Subject
1996	United States	Rasputin: Dark Servant of Destiny (TV)		Uli Edel	His last four years (1912–16)

=== Turkish War of Independence ===
Year	Country	Main title	Original title	Director	Subject
1970	United Kingdom	You Can't Win 'Em All		Peter Collinson	Two American veterans join a gang of Turkish mercenaries in an escort mission
2007	Turkey	The Last Ottoman: Knockout Ali	Son Osmanlı Yandım Ali	Mustafa Şevki Doğan	Discharged Ottoman Navy veteran joins Mustafa Kemal's army
2014	Australia; United States	The Water Diviner		Russell Crowe	Australian farmer travels to Turkey to try to locate his three missing sons who went missing in the Battle of Gallipoli.

=== Armenian genocide ===
Year	Country	Main title	Original title	Director	Subject
1919	United States	Ravished Armenia (Auction of Souls)		Oscar Apfel	Based on the book Ravished Armenia.
2014	Germany; France; Italy; Russia; Poland; Canada; Turkey; Jordan	The Cut		Fatih Akin	
2016	Spain; United States	The Promise		Terry George	

== See also ==
- List of World War I video games
- List of World War II films

== Notes ==
- ^† This English language title is a literal translation from its original foreign language title.
  This title should always be replaced by an English language release title when that information becomes available.
