= Bolibar =

1928 British film by Walter Summers

- Directed by: Walter Summers
- Written by: Walter Summers
- Based on: The Marquis of Bolibar by Leo Perutz
- Produced by: H. Bruce Woolfe
- Starring: Elissa Landi; Michael Hogan; Hubert Carter; Carl Harbord
- Cinematography: Jack Parker
- Edited by: Adrian Brunel; Ivor Montagu
- Production company: British Instructional Films
- Distributed by: New Era Films
- Release date: 26 July 1928
- Country: United Kingdom
- Languages: Silent; English intertitles

Bolibar is a 1928 British silent drama film directed by Walter Summers and starring Elissa Landi, Michael Hogan, and Carl Harbord. It was based on the 1920 novel The Marquis of Bolibar by Leo Perutz. It was made by British Instructional Films at Cricklewood Studios. Also outside scenes shot on the island of Malta with hundreds of Maltese extras.

== Cast ==
- Elissa Landi as Françoise-Marie / La Monita
- Michael Hogan as Lt. Donop
- Hubert Carter as Col. Bellay
- Carl Harbord as Lt. Gunther
- Jerrold Robertshaw as The Marquise of Bolibar
- Cecil Barry as Dapt. Egolstein
- Evelyn Roberts as Captain Brockendorf
- Gerald Pring as Captain O'Callaghan
- Charles Emerald as Colonel
- Hector Abbas as Artist

== See also ==
- The Marquis of Bolibar (1922)
