= The Celestial City =

1929 British film by J. O. C. Orton

- Directed by: J. O. C. Orton
- Written by: J. O. C. Orton
- Produced by: Harry Bruce Woolfe
- Starring: Norah Baring; Cecil Fearnley; Lewis Dayton; Malvina Longfellow
- Cinematography: Jack Parker
- Production company: British Instructional Films
- Distributed by: JMG
- Release date: March 1929
- Running time: 8,768 feet
- Country: United Kingdom
- Languages: Silent; English intertitles

The Celestial City is a 1929 British silent crime film directed by J. O. C. Orton and starring Norah Baring, Cecil Fearnley and Lewis Dayton. The film was made at Welwyn Studios by British Instructional Films, and based on the 1926 The Celestial City by Emma Orczy.

== Cast ==
- Norah Baring as Lita
- Cecil Fearnley as Sir Philip Charteris
- Lewis Dayton as Paul Sergine
- Malvina Longfellow as Princess Brokska
- Henri De Vries as Bill
- Frank Perfitt as Sir John Errick
- Albert Rebla as Laddie
- Gordon Begg as Truscott

== Bibliography ==
- Low, Rachael. History of the British Film, 1918-1929. George Allen & Unwin, 1971.
