= Windjammer (1930 film) =

1930 film

- Trade show poster
- Directed by: John Orton
- Written by: A.P. Herbert
- Produced by: H. Bruce Woolfe, Michael Villiers
- Starring: Michael Hogan; Tony Bruce
- Cinematography: R.J. Walker; Alan Villiers
- Edited by: John Orton
- Production companies: British Instructional Films, Welwyn Studios
- Release date: 1930
- Running time: 68 minutes
- Country: United Kingdom
- Language: English

Windjammer (also known as The Windjammer) is a 1930 British adventure film directed by John Orton and starring Michael Hogan and Tony Bruce. Stuart Legg and Arthur B. Woods were assistant directors. It was written by A.P. Herbert based on the 1930 book By Way of Cape Horn by A.J. Villiers, and produced by British Instructional Films.

== Premise ==
A full-rigged windjammer ship (the Grace Hawar) sails from Australia to England via Cape Horn.

== Cast ==
- Michael Hogan as Bert
- Tony Bruce as Jack
- Hal Gordon as Alf
- J. Barber as crew
- C. Levey as crew
- C. Christie as crew
- S. Christie as crew
- Roy Travers as Old Ned
- J. Cunningham as crew
- Hal Booth as crew
- Gordon Craig as youth
- G. Thomas as crew
- Sam Livesey as crew

== Reception ==
Kine Weekly wrote: "A refreshing drama which vividly depicts life on an old 'windjammer' and contains some brilliant nautical shots, but becomes very monotonous towards the finish owing to the slightness of the story, which is almost negligible ... The hazardous voyage from Australia to England, the storms encountered, and the privations endured by the crew result in a certain amount of drama, but the picture is lacking in high spots. ... Still, its intimate glimpses of life on a windjammer, together with the exceedingly fine pictorial work, results in the interest being fairly evenly sustained. The recording is not very clear, nor is the dialogue outstanding. The camera work is very fine, and forms one of the main attractions of the film. "

Film Weekly wrote: "Across the world on a sailing ship. Fine pictures but little story. Unusual film that is worth seeinng."

Picture Show wrote: "The record of the voyage of a sailing ship from Australia to England. Magnificent photography of the sea in calm and storm."

Time Out wrote: "This account of the five month voyage of the Grace Harwar from Wallaroo in Australia to London in 1929 is an extraordinary combination of documentary and low-life drama. Working class hero Bert is as bloody-minded as Arthur Seaton in Saturday Night and Sunday Morning, and leads a chorus of eccentrically seedy sailors in grousing about the patched and battered old sailing ship. AP Herbert's phlegmatically salty dialogue, and the stunning photography of angry seas and men swinging through the rigging like gibbons (which the young cameraman paid for with his life), give the film an almost hallucinatory resonance. An authentic glimpse into a lost world."
