= Chamber of Horrors (1929 film) =

1929 British film by Walter Summers

- Directed by: Walter Summers
- Written by: Walter Summers
- Produced by: H. Bruce Woolfe
- Starring: Frank Stanmore; Elizabeth Hempel
- Production company: British Instructional Films
- Distributed by: Producers Distributing Corporation
- Release date: March 1929
- Running time: 58 minutes
- Country: United Kingdom
- Languages: Silent; English intertitles

Chamber of Horrors is a 1929 British silent horror film directed by Walter Summers and starring Frank Stanmore and Elizabeth Hempel. It was made at Welwyn Studios. Film historians consider this movie the last major silent film made in England.

== Plot ==
James Budgeforth spends the night in the Chamber of Horrors of Madame Tussauds. While there, he has a nightmare in which he murders his mistress Ninette, and believing the dream to be real, he loses his sanity during the night.

== Cast ==
- Frank Stanmore as James Budgeforth
- Elizabeth Hempel as Ninette
- Leslie Holland as deaf mute
- Joan Maude as lady reporter
- Fanny Wright as lecturer

== Bibliography ==
- Wood, Linda. British Films, 1927-1939. British Film Institute, 1986.
