= Strictly Business (1931 film) =

1931 film

- Directed by: Mary Field; Jacqueline Logan
- Written by: Jacqueline Logan
- Starring: Betty Amann; Carl Harbord; Molly Lamont
- Cinematography: Jack Parker
- Production company: British Instructional Films
- Distributed by: Wardour Films
- Release date: 29 December 1931
- Running time: 46 minutes
- Country: United Kingdom
- Language: English

Strictly Business is a 1931 British comedy film directed by Mary Field and Jacqueline Logan and starring Betty Amann, Carl Harbord and Molly Lamont. It was made at Welwyn Studios as a quota quickie.

== Cast ==
- Betty Amann as Theodora Smith
- Carl Harbord as David Plummet
- Molly Lamont as Maureen
- Percy Parsons as Mr. Smith
- Philip Strange as Bartling
- C. M. Hallard as Mr. Plummet
- Gordon Begg as Stormont

== Bibliography ==
- Chibnall, Steve. Quota Quickies: The Birth of the British 'B' Film. British Film Institute, 2007.
- Low, Rachael. Filmmaking in 1930s Britain. George Allen & Unwin, 1985.
- Wood, Linda. British Films, 1927-1939. British Film Institute, 1986.
