= Boadicea (film) =

1927 British film by Sinclair Hill

- Directed by: Sinclair Hill
- Written by: Anthony Asquith; Sinclair Hill
- Produced by: Harry Bruce Woolfe
- Starring: Phyllis Neilson-Terry; Lillian Hall-Davis; Clifford McLaglen
- Cinematography: Jack Parker
- Production company: British Instructional Films
- Distributed by: New Era Films
- Release date: 5 September 1927
- Running time: 96 minutes
- Country: United Kingdom
- Languages: Silent; English intertitles

Boadicea is a 1927 British historical film directed by Sinclair Hill and starring Phyllis Neilson-Terry, Lillian Hall-Davis, and Clifford McLaglen. It depicts the life of the Celtic Queen Boudica (Boadicea) and her rebellion against the Roman Empire.

== Cast ==
- Phyllis Neilson-Terry as Queen Boadicea
- Lillian Hall-Davis as Emmelyn
- Clifford McLaglen as Marcus
- Sybil Rhoda as Blondicca
- Fred Raynham as Badwallon
- Clifford Heatherley as Catus Decianus
- Humberston Wright as Prasutagus
- Edward O'Neill as Caradoc
- Cyril McLaglen as Madoc
- Roy Raymond as Burrus
- Wally Patch as Officer in Roman Army

== Bibliography ==
- Low, Rachael. History of the British Film, 1918-1929. George Allen & Unwin, 1971.
