= Princess Priscilla's Fortnight =

- Author: Elizabeth von Arnim
- Language: English
- Publication date: 1905

Princess Priscilla's Fortnight is a 1905 comedy-drama novel by the British writer Elizabeth von Arnim, known at the time as Elizabeth, Countess Russell. It was turned into a play The Cottage in the Air in 1909.

== Film adaptation ==
In 1929 the novel was turned into a film The Runaway Princess directed by Anthony Asquith and Fritz Wendhausen and starring Mady Christians, Norah Baring and Paul Cavanagh. It was a co-production between the Britain and Germany, and a separate German language version Priscillas Fahrt ins Glück was made.

== Bibliography ==
- Boardman, Gerald Martin. American Theatre: A Chronicle of Comedy and Drama, 1869-1914. Oxford University Press, 1994.
