= The Runaway Princess =

1929 film by Anthony Asquith and Fritz Wendhausen

- Directed by: Anthony Asquith; Fritz Wendhausen
- Written by: Alfred Schirokauer
- Based on: Princess Priscilla's Fortnight by Elizabeth Russell
- Produced by: Harry Bruce Woolfe
- Starring: Mady Christians; Norah Baring; Paul Cavanagh; Anne Grey
- Cinematography: Henry Harris; Fritz Wendhausen; Arpad Viragh
- Production companies: British Instructional Films; Laender Film
- Distributed by: Jury Metro-Goldwyn
- Release dates: March 1929 (UK); 15 April 1929 (Berlin)
- Running time: 7,053 feet
- Countries: United Kingdom; Germany
- Languages: Silent; English intertitles

The Runaway Princess is a 1929 British-German silent drama film directed by Anthony Asquith and Fritz Wendhausen and starring Mady Christians, Fred Rains, Paul Cavanagh, and Anne Grey.

== Cast ==
- Mady Christians as Princess Priscilla
- Paul Cavanagh as Prince of Savonia
- Norah Baring as The Forger
- Fred Rains as The Professor
- Claude Beerbohm as The Detective
- Eveline Chipman
- Lewis Dayton
- Anne Grey

== Production ==
The film was a co-production between British Instructional Films and the German company Laender Film. It was made at Laenderfilm Studios in Berlin and Welwyn Studios in Hertfordshire. It was based on the 1905 novel Princess Priscilla's Fortnight by Lady Elizabeth Russell. An alternative German-language version known as Priscillas Fahrt ins Glück was directed by Fritz Wendhausen.
