= Clifford McLaglen =

British actor (1892–1978)

- Born: 15 June 1892; United Kingdom
- Died: 9 September 1978 (aged 86); United Kingdom
- Occupation: Actor
- Years active: 1926–36

Clifford McLaglen (15 June 1892 – 9 September 1978) was a Stepney, London or Cape Town, Cape Colony - born British film actor. He was one of nine or ten children and brother of several actors including Victor McLaglen, Oscar winner for best actor, The Informer (director John Ford), and nominated for best supporting actor The Quiet Man.

== Career ==
The other brothers were Leopold McLaglen, wrestler and inventor of a form of Jujutsu which he taught to the armed forces and police in the old Empire and America; Lewis McLaglen, actor and soldier; Cyril McLaglen, actor and horseman; Arthur McLaglen, actor, unarmed combat professional and sculptor; Kenneth McLaglen, actor and mineralogist; sister Lily Marian McLaglen (Mrs. Lance Tweedy), actress singer and pianist.

Clifford McLaglen was born Clifford Henrich McLaglen from Scottish, Irish, and Dutch ancestry. He, like all his brothers except the youngest two, Cyril and Kenneth, served in the First World War. He also served in the Second World War going out to Iceland to help guard Winston Churchill, for which he obtained a bulldog and polar bear badge. He also was part of a film unit at that time in the army. His father was born in Cape Town, South Africa where he was a missionary for the Free Protestant Episcopal Church and came to London to study as Clerk in Orders, eventually becoming Titular Bishop of Claremont in Cape Town but forgoing this to help with the work he dedicated to the helping of poverty stricken children in London and beggars. Lily often helped with this. Clifford worked in a tin mine in Cornwall before joining up in 1914. Later he worked for Sangers Circus riding horses and doing rope tricks and worked in vaudeville with his various brothers.

He starred in many silent films in Britain, in Boadicea (where he rode Roman style learnt in the army and circus) in 1927; France and Germany, making in 1929 the reputedly first German Talkie with Conrad Veidt, Bride 68 or Das Land Ohne Frauen, set in Australia with camels and the desert but all filmed in a Berlin studio with a tank of water spilling from overhead and an aeroplane propeller. In 1929 Clifford also filmed in Majorca, in Die Schmugglerbraut von Sorrento (various versions changed Majorca to Sorrento), bringing over horses with him, which he said were seasick. The film was made in Majorca but was meant to be Sorrento. Cavalcanti made two prize winning films in France with Clifford McLaglen: Rien Que Les Heures (1926) and Yvette (1928). He made a few talkies and was on the stage in America, on Broadway with Frederick March's wife Florence Eldridge. He was going to make a film called Ropes of Sand but nothing came of it.

McLaglen died in Huddersfield, Yorkshire in 1978.

== Selected filmography ==
- In the Blood (1923)
- Forbidden Cargoes (1925),
- The Chinese Bungalow (1926)
- The White Sheik (1928)
- Boadicea (1928)
- Yvette (1928)
- Struggle for the Matterhorn (1928)
- Villa Falconieri (1928)
- The Smuggler's Bride of Mallorca (1929)
- The Alley Cat (1929)
- Land Without Women (1929)
- The Three Kings (1929)
- The Lost Patrol (1929)
- Don Manuel, the Bandit (1929)
- Call of the Sea (1930)
- The Bermondsey Kid (1933)
- Late Extra (1935)
- A Little Bit of Bluff (1935)
- The Mystery of the Mary Celeste (1935)
- Off the Dole (1935)
- The Marriage of Corbal (1936)
