= Carl Harbord =

English-American actor (1908–1958)

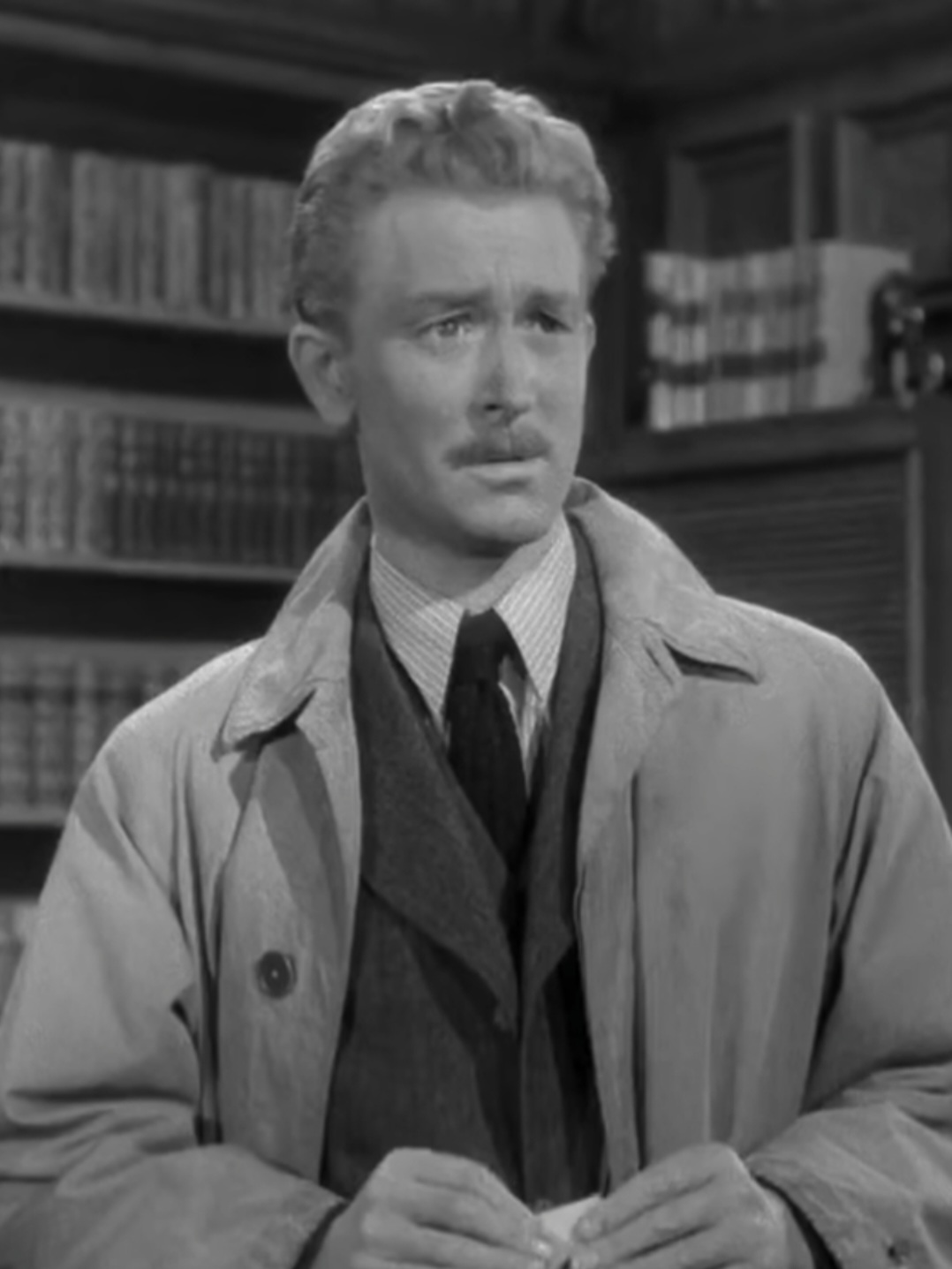
- Harbord as Inspector Stanley Hopkins in Dressed to Kill (1946)
- Born: 26 January 1908; Salcombe, Devon, England
- Died: 18 October 1958 (aged 50); Los Angeles, California, U.S.
- Occupation: Actor
- Years active: 1928–1955
- Spouse: Isobel Elsom (m. 1942)

Carl Harbord (26 January 1908 – 18 October 1958) was an English stage, film and television actor.

== Stage ==
When he was 19, Harbord appeared in the play The Happy Husband, which was presented at the Criterion Theatre in London, England. In 1933, he first appeared in a play in Australia. His first Broadway appearance was in 1934, in a production of Noël Coward's Conversation Piece at the 44th Street Theatre.

== Film ==
Harbord entered the film industry during the final stage of the silent era. He appeared in several early sound films for British International Pictures such as The Informer. One of his most prominent roles was in Anthony Asquith's First World War film Tell England. Harbord later went to Hollywood where he played supporting, but sometimes significant minor roles.

== Partial filmography ==
- Bolibar (1928) - Lt. Gunther
- Young Woodley (1928) - Ainger
- The American Prisoner (1929) - Lt. Burnham
- The Informer (1929) - Francis McPhillip
- The Hate Ship (1929) - Arthur Wardell
- An Obvious Situation (1930) - Michael Turner
- Such Is the Law (1930) - Vivian Fairfax
- Tell England (1931) - Edgar Doe
- Fascination (1931) - Larry Maitland
- Dance Pretty Lady (1931) - Maurice Avery
- Strictly Business (1931) - David Plummett
- She Was Only a Village Maiden (1933) - Peter
- The Mystery of Mr. X (1934) - Constable (uncredited)
- The Scarlet Pimpernel (1934) - Member of the League (uncredited)
- 18 Minutes (1935) - Jacques
- Heart's Desire (1936) - Oliver Desmond
- Love at Sea (1935) - Dick
- The Cavalier of the Streets (1937) - Prince Karanov
- Captains of the Clouds (1942) - Blake
- Eagle Squadron (1942) - Lubbock
- London Blackout Murders (1943) - George Sandleigh
- Background to Danger (1943) - Minor Role (uncredited)
- Sahara (1943) - Marty Williams
- Dressed to Kill (1946) - Inspector Hopkins
- The Macomber Affair (1947) - Coroner
- Bulldog Drummond Strikes Back (1947) - Inspector Sanderson
- Christmas Eve (1947) - Dr. Doremus
- A Woman's Vengeance (1948) - Leslie Blake
- Rope of Sand (1949) - Perseus Club Manager (uncredited)

== Bibliography ==
- Kelly, Andrew. Cinema and the Great War. Routledge, 1997.
