= The Battles of Coronel and Falkland Islands =

1927 British film by Walter Summers

- Directed by: Walter Summers
- Written by: Frank Bowden; John Buchan; Merritt Crawford; Harry Engholm
- Produced by: Harry Bruce Woolfe
- Cinematography: Jack Parker; Stanley Rodwell
- Production company: British Instructional Films
- Distributed by: British Instructional Films
- Release date: 27 October 1927
- Running time: 107 minutes
- Country: United Kingdom
- Language: English
- Budget: £18,000

The Battles of Coronel and Falkland Islands is a 1927 British docudrama film directed by Walter Summers. The film focuses on the naval warfare around the Battle of Coronel and Battle of the Falkland Islands during the First World War. It was the last in a successful series of documentary reconstructions of First World War battles by British Instructional Films made between 1921 and 1927. The film was produced at Cricklewood Studios and on location off Malta and the Isles of Scilly. The film is a fictional recreation with a strong documentary feel.

The film cost an estimated £18,000 to make. It grossed £70,000 in Britain alone. It was restored and re-released by the BFI in 2014.

== Restoration ==
In 2014 the BFI National Archive restored the film for the centenary of the events with a new score composed by Simon Dobson.

== Historical background ==
On 1 November 1914, off the coast of Chile near Coronel, ships of the German and British navies exchanged fire resulting in the sinking of two British ships HMS Monmouth and HMS Good Hope with the loss of nearly 1,600 sailors. To counter the German squadron, the Royal Navy sent two battle-cruisers - Inflexible and Invincible - to the South Atlantic. In December 1914, the British battle-cruisers, accompanied by smaller ships, engaged the German squadron during the Battle of the Falkland Islands and sank the German armoured cruisers SMS Scharnhorst and SMS Gneisenau near the Falkland Islands.

== Bibliography ==
- Dixon, Bryony. "Battles of the Coronel and Falkland Islands, The (1927)". BFI Screenonline. Archived from the original on 4 August 2011.
- Low, Rachael. History of the British Film, 1918-1929. George Allen & Unwin, 1971.
- Wood, Linda. British Films 1927-1939. British Film Institute, 1986.
