= Shooting Stars (1927 film) =

1927 film

- Directed by: Anthony Asquith; A. V. Bramble
- Written by: Anthony Asquith; John Orton
- Produced by: Harry Bruce Woolfe
- Starring: Annette Benson; Brian Aherne; Donald Calthrop; Wally Patch
- Cinematography: Henry Harris; Stanley Rodwell
- Production company: British Instructional Films
- Distributed by: New Era Films; Aywon Pictures (US)
- Release date: 10 June 1928 (US)
- Running time: 80 minutes
- Country: United Kingdom
- Language: English

Shooting Stars (1928) by Anthony Asquith and A. V. Bramble

Shooting Stars is a 1927 British drama film directed by Anthony Asquith and A. V. Bramble and starring Annette Benson, Brian Aherne and Wally Patch. The screenplay concerns a starlet who plots an escape to Hollywood.

== Premise ==
At Zenith Studios, a starlet plots an escape to Hollywood with her lover and the murder of her superfluous husband.

== Cast ==
- Annette Benson as Mae Feather
- Brian Aherne as Julian Gordon
- Donald Calthrop as Andy Wilkes
- Wally Patch as Property Man
- David Brooks as Turner
- Ella Daincourt as Asphodel Smythe, Journalist
- Chili Bouchier as Winnie, Bathing Beauty
- Tubby Phillips as Fatty
- Ian Wilson as Reporter
- Judd Green as Lighting Man
- Jack Rawl as Hero

== Production ==
It was Asquith's first film as a director. It was made at Cricklewood Studios in North London for British Instructional Films. The novelisation of the film was written by the popular novelist E. Charles Vivian.

== Restoration ==
Shooting Stars was restored in 2015 by the British Film Institute with a new score by John Altman. The new print premiered as the Archive Gala of the 2015 London Film Festival.
