= Dance Pretty Lady =

1931 British film by Anthony Asquith

- Opening titles
- Directed by: Anthony Asquith
- Written by: Anthony Asquith
- Based on: Carnival by Compton Mackenzie
- Produced by: Harry Bruce Woolfe
- Starring: Ann Casson; Carl Harbord; Moore Marriott
- Cinematography: Jack Parker
- Music by: John Reynders
- Production company: British Instructional Films
- Distributed by: Wardour Films
- Release date: 10 December 1931
- Running time: 64 minutes
- Country: United Kingdom
- Language: English

Dance Pretty Lady (also known as Carnival) is a 1931 British drama film directed by Anthony Asquith and starring Ann Casson, Carl Harbord, Michael Hogan, Moore Marriott and Flora Robson. It was written by Asquith based on the 1912 novel Carnival by Compton Mackenzie, and was made as a quota quickie by British Instructional Films. It was remade as the 1946 film Carnival.

== Plot ==
During the Edwardian era, a working-class ballet dancer begins a romance with a wealthy artist against a background of sharp disapproval.

== Cast ==
- Ann Casson as Jenny Pearl
- Carl Harbord as Maurice Avery
- Michael Hogan as Castleton
- Moore Marriott as Mr Raeburn
- Flora Robson as Mrs Raeburn
- Leonard Brett as Alf
- Norman Claridge as Jack Danby
- Sunday Wilshin as Irene
- René Ray as Elsie
- Eva Llewellyn as Aunt Mabel
- Marie Rambert Dancers as dancers
- Wendy Toye as dancer

== Reception ==
Film Weekly wrote: "Anthony Asquith, while handling his camera as cleverly as usual, shows by his direction that he lacks the human, sympathetic touch, necessary for an emotional love story. His players seem to be just puppets, in spite of fairly adequate performances by Ann Casson, Carl Harbord and others."

The Daily Film Renter wrote: "Anthony Asquith's direction is delicate and unusually intelligent, and a real feeling for the variances of character and respect for artistic value and true emotion is apparent throughout. If he is to be criticised it is rather because he frequently holds up the development with an overabundance of detail, which may result in popular audiences finding it rather heavy and slow. All the same, it is a pleasure to greet a picture which eschews the usual cheap effects, and the sincerity of the acting is in the same class as the direction."
