= Mons (film) =

1926 film directed by Walter Summers

- Directed by: Walter Summers
- Written by: Walter Summers
- Production company: British Instructional Films
- Distributed by: New Era Films
- Release date: 16 September 1926
- Country: United Kingdom
- Languages: Silent; English intertitles

Mons is a 1926 British silent war film directed by Walter Summers. It reconstructs the 1914 Battle of Mons during the First World War. Such reconstruction films were popular during the decade, and Summers had previously made the similar Ypres the previous year.

== Bibliography ==
- Alan Burton & Steve Chibnall. Historical Dictionary of British Cinema. Scarecrow Press, 2013.
