= Surbiton Studios =

Films studios located in London

Coordinates: 51.394°N 0.307°W

Surbiton Studios was a British film studio located in Surbiton, then on the outskirts of London. The studio was one of several that opened during the boom in British production following the First World War. It was opened in 1918 (107 years ago) and its first film was released in January 1919. Its owners were Stoll Pictures which became one of the largest British film companies of the early 1920s.

Because Surbiton's single-stage studio was considered too small for the company's ambitions, Stoll moved most of its production to the much-larger Cricklewood Studios and rented Surbiton out to independent producers. Stoll films continued to be made there occasionally until 1923 when the studio was sold to British Instructional Films (BIF). The following year Stoll took over BIF, and Surbiton came back under its control. BIF eventually moved its production to the more modern Welwyn Studios, and Surbiton closed.

== See also ==
- List of Stoll Pictures films

== Bibliography ==
- Low, Rachael. History of the British Film, 1918–1929. George Allen & Unwin, 1971.
- Warren, Patricia. British Film Studios: An Illustrated History. Batsford, 2001.
