= Nelson (1926 film) =

1926 film directed by Walter Summers

- Directed by: Walter Summers
- Written by: Robert Southey (book); Walter Summers
- Produced by: H. Bruce Woolfe
- Starring: Cedric Hardwicke; Gertrude McCoy; Frank Perfitt
- Cinematography: Jack Parker
- Production company: British Instructional Films
- Distributed by: New Era Films
- Release date: 14 September 1926
- Running time: 80 minutes
- Country: United Kingdom
- Languages: Silent; English intertitles

Nelson is a silent 1926 British historical film directed by Walter Summers and starring Cedric Hardwicke, Gertrude McCoy and Frank Perfitt. A biopic of Admiral Horatio Nelson, it is based on the biography by Robert Southey. It was made with the approval of the Admiralty.

The film's sets were designed by the art director Walter Murton.

== Cast ==
- Cedric Hardwicke as Horatio Nelson
- Gertrude McCoy as Lady Hamilton
- Frank Perfitt as Captain Hardy
- Frank Arlton as Governor
- Pat Courtney as Nelson as a child
