= Lost Patrol (1929 film) =

1929 film directed by Walter Summers

- Directed by: Walter Summers
- Written by: Philip MacDonald (novel); Walter Summers
- Produced by: Harry Bruce Woolfe
- Starring: Cyril McLaglen; Sam Wilkinson; Terence Collier; Arthur B. Woods
- Production company: British Instructional Films
- Distributed by: Fox Film Corporation
- Release date: February 1929
- Running time: 7,250 feet
- Country: United Kingdom
- Languages: Silent; English intertitles

Lost Patrol is a 1929 British silent war film directed by Walter Summers and starring Cyril McLaglen, Sam Wilkinson and Terence Collier.

The film was made at Welwyn Studios by British Instructional Films. It was based on the 1927 novel Patrol by Philip MacDonald. It was remade in 1934 by John Ford.

== Synopsis ==
During the First World War, a hard-pressed British patrol in the deserts of Mesopotamia come under attack from the enemy. Gradually they are picked off one by one.

== Reception ==
In 1929, a critical statement from Time magazine concluded, "It is too bad that this heat, or something, made director Walter Summers, known for his competent war newsreels, mess up this opportunity."

== Cast ==
- Cyril McLaglen as The Sergeant
- Sam Wilkinson as Sanders
- Terence Collier as Corporal Bell
- Arthur B. Woods as Lieutenant Hawkins
- Hamilton Keene as Morelli
- Fred Dyer as Abelson
- Charles Emerald as Hale
- Andrew McMaster as Brown
- James Watts as Cook
- John Valentine as Mackay

== Bibliography ==
- Low, Rachel. The History of British Film: Volume IV, 1918–1929. Routledge, 1997.
