= Frank Perfitt =

British actor (1880–1958)

Frank James Robert Perfitt (1880 – 1958) was a British film actor, born in Norwich, Norfolk in 1880. He died in Surrey in 1958.

== Selected filmography ==
- The Flying Fifty-Five (1924)
- Love and Hate (1924)
- The Sins Ye Do (1924)
- Nelson (1926)
- Dawn (1928)
- What Next? (1928)
- Maria Marten(1928)
- The Silent House (1929)
- The Celestial City (1929)
- The Woman in White (1929)
- Alf's Carpet (1929)
- Night Birds (1930)
- Red Pearls (1930)
- You'd Be Surprised! (1930)
- Compromising Daphne (1930)
- The Love Race (1931)
- Number, Please (1931)
- The Pride of the Force (1933)
- Tonight's the Night (1932)
- Keep Your Seats, Please (1936)
- Feather Your Nest (1937)
