= Love and Hate (1924 film) =

1924 film

- Directed by: Thomas Bentley
- Written by: W. Pett Ridge; Eliot Stannard
- Produced by: Edward Godal
- Starring: George Foley; Eve Chambers; Frank Perfitt
- Production companies: British & Colonial Kinematograph Company
- Distributed by: Ideal
- Release date: 1924
- Country: United Kingdom
- Language: English

Love and Hate is a 1924 British silent comedy film directed by Thomas Bentley and starring George Foley, Eve Chambers and Frank Perfitt. It was made by British & Colonial Kinematograph Company at the company's Walthamstow Studios.

== Cast ==
- George Foley as Apps
- Eve Chambers as Mrs. Williams
- Frank Perfitt as Tompson
- Sydney Fairbrother

== Bibliography ==
- Low, Rachael. (1971). History of the British Film, 1918-1929. George Allen & Unwin.
