= Tell England (film) =

1931 film

- Directed by: Anthony Asquith; Geoffrey Barkas
- Written by: Ernest Raymond (novel); A. P. Herbert; Anthony Asquith
- Produced by: H. Bruce Woolfe
- Starring: Fay Compton; Tony Bruce; Carl Harbord; Dennis Hoey
- Cinematography: Jack Parker; Stanley Rodwell; James E. Rogers
- Edited by: Mary Field
- Music by: Hubert Bath
- Production company: British Instructional Films
- Distributed by: Wardour Films
- Release date: 2 March 1931
- Running time: 80 minutes
- Country: United Kingdom
- Language: English

Tell England (U.S. title: The Battle of Gallipoli) is a 1931 British drama film directed by Anthony Asquith and Geoffrey Barkas and starring Fay Compton, Tony Bruce and Carl Harbord. It was written by A. P. Herbert and Anthony Asquith based on the 1922 novel Tell England by Ernest Raymond, which featured two young men joining the army, and taking part in the fighting at Gallipoli.

Both directors had close memories of Gallipoli, as did Fay Compton's brother, Compton Mackenzie.Asquith's father H. H. Asquith had been Prime Minister at the time of the Gallipoli Landings, a fact which drew press attention to the film, while Barkas had fought at Suvla Bay in the Gallipoli campaign.

== Plot ==
At the outbreak of the World War I, childhood friends Edgar Doe and Rupert Ray enlist in the army, immediately after leaving school. Both earn officer commissions and are deployed to Gallipoli. The prolonged periods of inaction and relentless casualties take a heavy toll on Doe, fraying his nerves and causing a falling-out between him and Ray, who has been promoted to Captain. However, upon learning of an upcoming raid on the Turkish lines, Doe finds renewed resolve. He goes over the top, braves severe injuries to reach the mortar position, and single-handedly destroys it, before succumbing to his wounds.

== Production ==
The film had originally been intended to be made as a silent film, but was delayed. It was made at Welwyn Studios using the German Klangfilm process. Much of the film was shot on location in Malta, standing in for Gallipoli.

== Cast ==
- Fay Compton as Mrs. Doe
- Tony Bruce as Rupert Ray
- Carl Harbord as Edgar Doe
- Dennis Hoey as the Padre
- C. M. Hallard as the Colonel
- Gerald Rawlinson as Lt. Doon
- Frederick Lloyd as Capt. Hardy
- Sam Wilkinson as Private Booth
- Wally Patch as Sergeant
- Hubert Harben as Mr. Ray
- Ian Hamilton as himself

== Reception ==
Film Weekly wrote: "All the stark ferocity of the Gallipoli campaign, with its amazing mixture of courage and heroism, is depicted in Tell England with the authentic stamp of realism. Powerful alike in their mass effects and striking detail, the battle scenes, the landings of the Anzacs, the charges into a hail of machine-gun fire, and the singlehanded feat of one of the principal characters are all inspiring and thrilling spectacles."

Kine Weekly wrote: "Although rather a late addition to the ranks of war pictures, this film approaches the subject from a fresh angle, and is not without profound interest. It is, too, typically English in its sentiments and grim humour. The picture is not entertaining in the accepted sense, but its inspiring theme, stark realism and human interest provide food for thought and make it an unusual proposition for all who possess a spark of patriotism in their make-up."

Variety wrote: "While there's quite a lot of good stuff in it, it just doesn't make entertainment in the big sense. As a war picture it unreels all the now familiar stuff which took its fashion from films like All Quiet. ... But it never grips, in the sense some of its forerunners did. Now and again there is an odd sequence which does get a slight kick, but only occasionally. Generally, Asquith has been so keen on getting unusual camera angles and nipping up all his quick-cutting stuff that he hasn't time to put any real guts into the mixture."
