= Jack Parker (cinematographer) =

British cinematographer and cameraman

- Born: 1885; United Kingdom
- Occupation: Cinematographer
- Years active: 1921–1953 (film)

Jack Parker (1885–?) was a British cinematographer and cameraman. He worked on a mixture of features and documentary films during his career. In the 1930s he worked on a number of BIP and Butcher's Film Service productions, while in the 1940s he was employed as a cameraman on Ealing Studios films.

== Selected filmography ==
=== Cinematographer ===
- All Roads Lead to Calvary (1921)
- The House of Peril (1922)
- Nelson (1926)
- Boadicea (1927)
- The Battles of Coronel and Falkland Islands (1927)
- The Celestial City (1929)
- Windjammer (1930)
- Dance Pretty Lady (1931)
- Tell England (1931)
- Carnival (1931)
- Strictly Business (1931)
- Men Like These (1932)
- The Bad Companions (1932)
- On Secret Service (1933)
- Meet My Sister (1933)
- The Warren Case (1934)
- Lost in the Legion (1934)
- The Outcast (1934)
- The Return of Bulldog Drummond (1934)
- Dandy Dick (1935)
- Sweeney Todd (1936)
- The End of the Road (1936)
- Hearts of Humanity (1936)
- Men of Yesterday (1936)
- Variety Parade (1936)
- Annie Laurie (1936)
- Well Done, Henry (1936)
- Love Up the Pole (1936)
- Hot News (1936)
- Sunshine Ahead (1936)
- Accused (1936)
- Wanted! (1937)
- Rose of Tralee (1937)
- The Academy Decides (1937)
- The Schooner Gang (1937)
- Talking Feet (1937)
- The Elder Brother (1937)
- Sing as You Swing (1937)
- Stepping Toes (1938)

=== Cameraman ===
- The Missing Million (1942)
- Gert and Daisy Clean Up (1942)
- Dead of Night (1945)

== Bibliography ==
- Anthony Slide. Fifty Classic British Films, 1932–1982: A Pictorial Record. Courier Corporation, 1985.
