= His Buddy's Wife =

1925 film

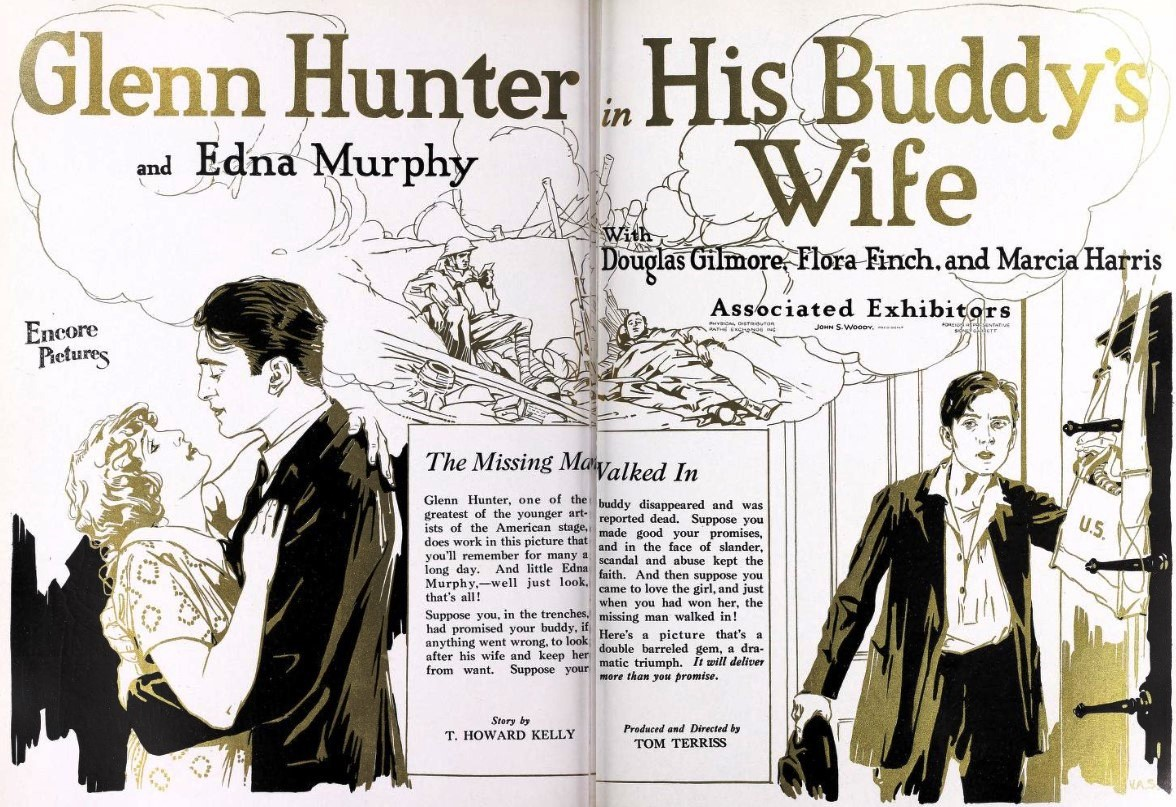
- Advertisement
- Directed by: Tom Terriss
- Written by: T. Howard Kelly
- Produced by: Tom Terriss
- Starring: Glenn Hunter; Edna Murphy; Gordon Begg
- Cinematography: Henry Cronjager
- Production company: Associated Exhibitors
- Distributed by: Associated Exhibitors
- Release date: October 4, 1925
- Running time: 60 minutes
- Country: United States
- Language: Silent (English intertitles)

His Buddy's Wife is a 1925 American silent drama film directed by Tom Terriss and starring Glenn Hunter, Edna Murphy, and Gordon Begg.

== Plot ==
As described in a film magazine reviews, Jim McMorrow and Bill Mullaney, from entirely different walks of life, become buddies during the war. Jim, having no home ties, shares all Bill's thoughts and letters from his mother and wife. Bill is sent on a mission into “no man’s land.” He asks Jim to return to the farm and look after his wife and mother in case anything happens to him. He is reported missing after the armistice. Jim keeps his promise. The aged mother dies shortly after hearing the news of her son's death. Jim is wholly in love with Mary and, after the funeral arrangements, is persuaded to remain by the kindly village doctor to look after Mary and the farm. Village gossip is rife and scandalous happenings are reported at the farm. Jim beats up the village shopkeeper because of insulting remarks and is arrested. At the trial Mary comes to the rescue by announcing that she and Jim are about to be married. On their wedding night, Bill returns to the village, having heard that Mary was married, to take a last look at his wife and horse. Jim discovers him and explains that he and Mary were married in name only. After restoring the couple to each other's arms, Bill walks out of the picture.

== Cast ==
- Glenn Hunter as Jimmy McMorrow
- Edna Murphy as Mary Mullaney
- Gordon Begg as Dr. Summerfield
- Harlan Knight as Mr. Jones
- Cora Williams as Mrs. Jones
- Flora Finch as Mirandy
- Blanche Davenport as Mother Mullaney
- Douglas Gilmore as Bill Mullaney

== Gallery ==
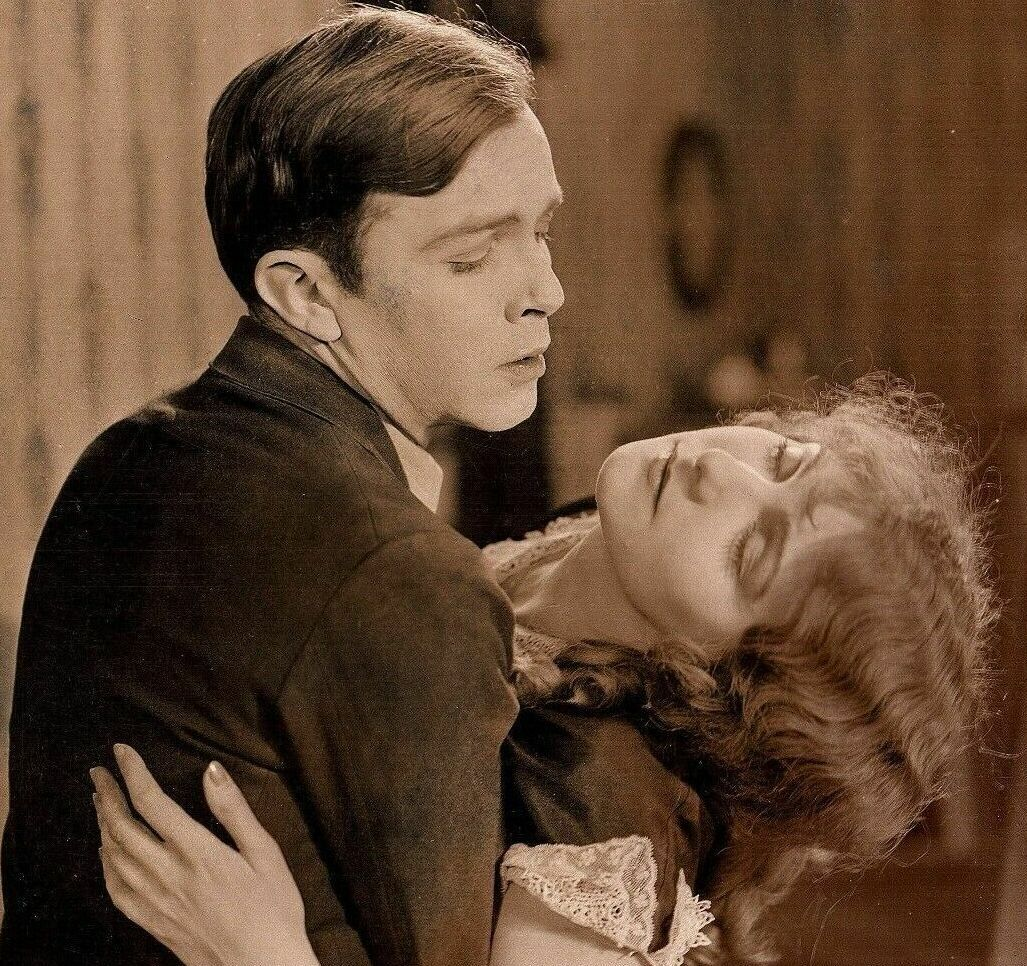

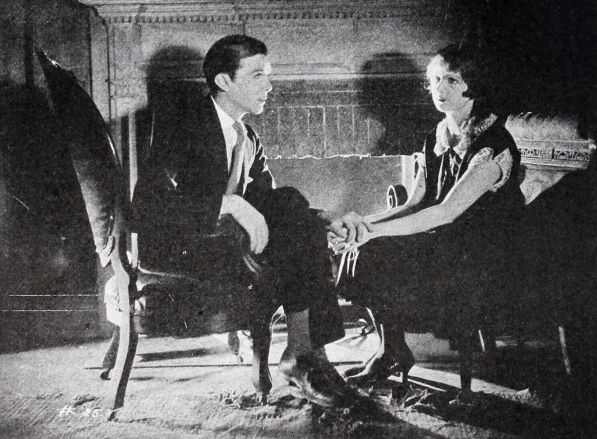

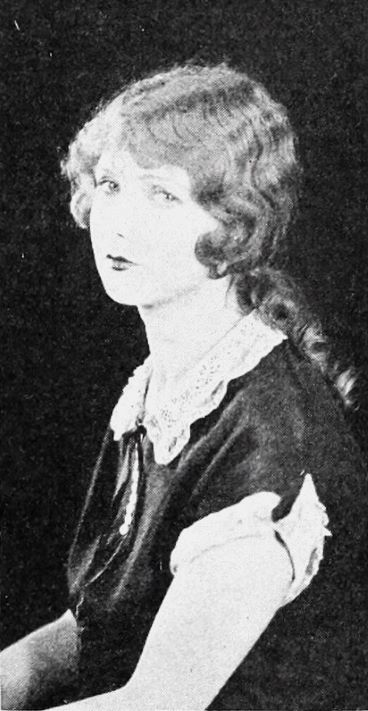

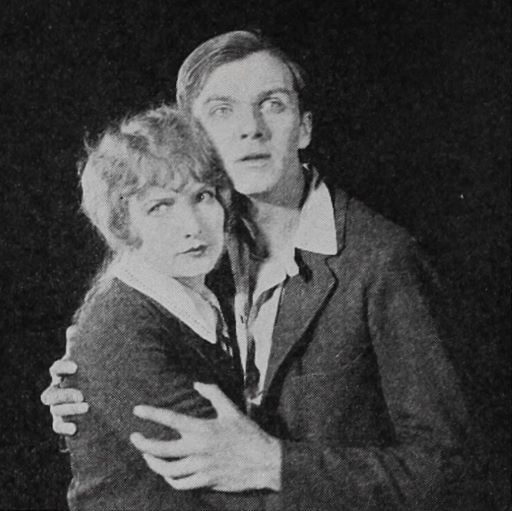

== Bibliography ==
- Munden, Kenneth White. The American Film Institute Catalog of Motion Pictures Produced in the United States, Part 1. University of California Press, 1997.
