= Gordon Begg =

Scottish actor (1868–1954)

- Born: 14 January 1868; Aberdeen, Scotland
- Died: February 1954 (aged 86); London, England
- Other name: Alexander Gordon Begg
- Occupations: Film actor Stage actor
- Years active: 1914–1954 (film)

Gordon Begg (14 January 1868 – February 1954) was a Scottish stage and film actor. During the silent film era he made several films in Hollywood, before returning to Britain. He appeared as William Shakespeare in the 1930 British revue film Elstree Calling.

== Selected filmography ==
- The Cost of a Kiss (1917)
- A Sinless Sinner (1919)
- The Harbour Lights (1923)
- The Bandolero (1924)
- His Buddy's Wife (1925)
- The Celestial City (1929)
- Elstree Calling (1930)
- The Officers' Mess (1931)
- Out of the Blue (1931)
- The Sleeping Cardinal (1931)
- Strictly Business (1931)
- The Shadow (1933)
- Princess Charming (1934)
- Dangerous Ground (1934)
- The Night of the Party (1935)
- The Marriage of Corbal (1936)
- Where There's a Will (1936)
- English Without Tears (1944)
- Welcome, Mr. Washington (1944)
- They Knew Mr. Knight (1946)
- Great Expectations (1946)
- What Do We Do Now? (1946)
