= A Couple of Down and Outs =

1923 British film by Walter Summers

- Directed by: Walter Summers
- Written by: Walter Summers
- Produced by: G.B. Samuelson
- Starring: Edna Best; Rex Davis; George Foley
- Production company: Napoleon Films
- Distributed by: Napoleon Films
- Release date: November 1923
- Country: United Kingdom
- Languages: Silent; English intertitles

A Couple of Down and Outs is a 1923 British silent drama film directed by Walter Summers and starring Edna Best, Rex Davis and George Foley.

== Synopsis ==
Danny Creath, an unemployed war veteran, is passing through the docks when sees his old horse 'Jack' being maltreated before it is shipped to Belgium to be turned into horsemeat. They had previously served together in the Royal Horse Artillery, both being wounded in action, and Creath decides to rescue him with the assistance of crowd of passers-by. Pursued by the police he takes shelter in a house where a young woman, reminded of her own brother who was killed during the war, helps him to escape.

== Cast ==
- Edna Best as Molly Roarke
- Rex Davis as Danny Creath
- George Foley as P.C. Roake
- Philip Hewland

== Production ==
It was made at Isleworth Studios. The film sought to raise public sympathy for veterans of the First World War struggling in the years of peace as well as animals who had undergone war service. Summers, who had himself served during the conflict, made a number of films using the war as backdrop.

== Bibliography ==
- Harris, Ed. Britain's Forgotten Film Factory: The Story of Isleworth Studios. Amberley Publishing, 2013.
