= List of The Young Indiana Jones Chronicles episodes =

This is a list of The Young Indiana Jones Chronicles episodes. It was created by George Lucas. Twenty-eight episodes were produced by Lucasfilm in association with Amblin and Paramount Pictures, though four were unaired during the series' original 1992–93 run on ABC. In 1996, some of the remaining episodes were combined and aired as four two-part TV movies on USA. The entire series was edited into twenty-two feature-length films later that year. Twelve of the films were released on VHS in 1999, while the rest were aired on the Fox Family Channel in 2001. All of the films were released on DVD throughout 2007 and 2008.

== Series overview ==
Season	Episodes	Originally released		
Season	Episodes	First released	Last released	Network
1	6	March 4, 1992	April 8, 1992	ABC
2	22	September 21, 1992	July 24, 1993	ABC
TV films	4	October 15, 1994	June 16, 1996	The Family Channel

== Episodes ==
=== Season 1 (1992) ===
The Young Indiana Jones Chronicles debuted on ABC on March 4, 1992, with the feature-length episode Young Indiana Jones and the Curse of the Jackal, which served to introduce the character at the two ages he would be portrayed as in the show. The five subsequent episodes in season one were hour-long.

No. overall	No. in season	Title	Directed by	Written by	Original release date	U.S. viewers (millions)
1	1	Young Indiana Jones and the Curse of the Jackal (Note: This feature-length episode consisted of "Egypt 1908" and "Mexico, March 1916".)	Jim O'Brien & Carl Schultz	Story by : George Lucas; Teleplay by : Jonathan Hales	March 4, 1992	26.7
Indiana Jones describes to two truant boys his early life with his family and his dog. In Oxford 1908, Indy meets Helen Seymour, whom Henry requests to teach him on their voyage to Egypt. After an expedition to the pyramids, T. E. Lawrence invites Indy to the excavation of Ka's tomb, where he meets his friend Rashid, assistant to archeologist Howard Carter. The next day, Rashid is found murdered and the jackal headpiece stolen. Dimitrius, the chief blaster of the excavation, is revealed to be behind this, but he flees. In Mexico 1916, Indy is captured by Mexican revolutionaries, but is rescued by a Belgian called Remy. As Indy gets involved in the war, he recognises Dimitrius, who is collaborating with the US. After hearing how hypocritically the revolutionaries act, Indy and Remy decide to leave but not before Indy fights and defeats Dimitrius, to recover the jackal.
2	2	"London, May 1916"	Carl Schultz	Story by : George Lucas; Teleplay by : Rosemary Anne Sisson	March 11, 1992	18.9
The 93-year-old Indiana Jones recounts to his colleague his meeting once with a feisty suffragette. In London 1916, the 16-year-old Indy decides to join his friend Remy in the Belgian army under the nom de guerre Henri Defense. That night, while waiting for basic training to begin, Indy meets a bus conductress called Vicky, who invites him to a suffragette meeting on the women's campaign for equal pay. After the meeting Indy goes out for tea with Vicky, where he shows off his knowledge of many languages.. Indy invites Vicky to go with him to Oxford to meet his old tutor Miss Seymour. At a dinner, Winston Churchill and Miss Seymour voice different views about suffragettes that Vicky finds unacceptable. Indy and Vicky spend a romantic time together and visit Vicky's parents, who live near Oxford. Back in London and due to ship off to basic training, Indy is about to propose to Vicky. However, due to complications, Vicky does not wish to marry Indy despite her feelings. Indy says farewell to Miss Seymour and Vicky before boarding the train to France with Remy.
3	3	"British East Africa, September 1909"	Carl Schultz	Story by : George Lucas; Teleplay by : Matthew Jacobs	March 18, 1992	19.0
Indy is at the Metropolitan Foundation for Educational Quality's Annual Celebrity Tennis Shoe Auction & Dinner, at the City Hotel & Conference Center. Two women sit at his table; one is an animal rights activist and vegetarian while the other holds opposing views. The two begin to fight, with Indy in the middle. He tells them that it reminds him of when he and his family were on his father's world lecture tour, and were invited to a coffee plantation in British East Africa that was owned by a friend of his father.
4	4	"Verdun, September 1916"	Rene Manzor	Story by : George Lucas; Teleplay by : Jonathan Hensleigh	March 25, 1992	16.5
Indiana Jones (as Corporal Henri Defense) is working as a motorcycle courier for the French army. He has numerous close calls delivering orders to officers on the front line. When General Joseph Joffre gives Indy orders that will send men to certain death, Indy makes a courageous decision.
5	5	"German East Africa, December 1916"	Simon Wincer	Story by : George Lucas; Teleplay by : Frank Darabont	April 1, 1992	17.9
Indy (as Lieutenant Henri Defense) leads his Askari African soldiers to victory in an attack on an enemy stronghold and is promoted to Captain. His unit is sent across the Belgian Congo on an important mission, but most die of disease and exhaustion.
6	6	"Congo, January 1917"	Simon Wincer	Story by : George Lucas; Teleplay by : Frank Darabont	April 8, 1992	15.2
Indy and Remy meet Albert Schweitzer and his wife. Indy learns valuable lessons on the ethic of Reverence for Life.

=== Season 2 (1992–93) ===
Season Two began on September 21, 1992, with the episode "Austria, March 1917", and the seventeen subsequent episodes consisted of both new episodes and some episodes originally produced for the first season—each an hour long. Harrison Ford made a guest appearance in the feature-length episode Young Indiana Jones and the Mystery of the Blues. When the show was cancelled, four episodes remained unaired: "Florence, May 1908", "Prague, August 1917", "Palestine, October 1917", and "Transylvania, January 1918". In Australia, "Somme, Early August 1916" and "Germany, Mid-August 1916" originally aired as a two-hour television movie entitled Young Indiana Jones and the Great Escape.

No. overall	No. in season	Title	Directed by	Written by	Original release date	U.S. viewers (millions)
7	1	"Austria, March 1917"	Vic Armstrong	Story by : George Lucas; Teleplay by : Frank Darabont	September 21, 1992	11.2
Indy is sent on an espionage mission to try to convince the new Austro-Hungarian Emperor Karl to leave the war in the Sixtus Affair.
8	2	"Somme, Early August 1916"	Simon Wincer	Story by : George Lucas; Teleplay by : Jonathan Hensleigh	September 28, 1992	10.5
Indy (as Corporal Henri Defense) and Remy have enlisted and are attached to a Belgian company fighting in the trenches of World War I. After their unit suffers catastrophic losses, all of the officers are dead and Indy is the highest-ranking soldier left. Their unit is assigned an interim French commander, Captain Moreau, and are ordered to take a hilltop chateau, which they do with only thirteen survivors. The Germans counterattack and the hill is lost, Indy is captured, and Remy's whereabouts are left unknown.
9	3	"Germany, Mid-August 1916"	Simon Wincer	Story by : George Lucas; Teleplay by : Jonathan Hensleigh	October 5, 1992	11.4
Indy is sent to a prison camp after being captured by the German army. That same day, he joins a band of inmates in a prison break. The escape attempt fails and he is recaptured and transferred to a maximum security prison in a German castle. There he meets Charles De Gaulle, who has also been captured several times trying to escape. The two plot another prison break, after which Indy escapes and De Gaulle is recaptured.
10	4	"Barcelona, May 1917"	Terry Jones	Story by : George Lucas; Teleplay by : Gavin Scott	October 12, 1992	8.6
Indy joins up with an international trio of spies plotting against their German counterparts in the neutral city of Barcelona. After his old acquaintance Pablo Picasso helps him get a job at the Ballets Russes, Indy devises a plan to forge a love letter written by the German cultural attaché to make it seem the man was having an affair with the Countess of Toledo.
11	5	Young Indiana Jones and the Mystery of the Blues (Note: This feature-length episode consisted of "Chicago, April 1920" and "Chicago, May 1920.")	Carl Schultz	Jule Selbo	March 13, 1993	18.2
Indy is at the University of Chicago and working as a part-time waiter in the spring of 1920. He is taught the basics of jazz by Sidney Bechet (whose last name is misspelled "Bichet" in the opening credits) and then becomes involved in a murder investigation during Prohibition. Also includes Eliot Ness as Indy's roommate and Ernest Hemingway as a freelance reporter for Chicago Tribune. (At the time the episode was set, Hemingway actually worked for The Toronto Star.) Harrison Ford — not George Hall — is featured somewhat briefly in the episode's framing device, set in approximately 1950.
12	6	"Princeton, February 1916"	Joe Johnston	Matthew Jacobs	March 20, 1993	10.1
Indy is still in high school but manages to become involved with investigating the theft of Thomas Edison's plans for an electric car.
13	7	"Petrograd, July 1917"	Simon Wincer	Story by : George Lucas; Teleplay by : Gavin Scott	March 27, 1993	7.2
Indy is doing intelligence work in Saint Petersburg during the growing political unrest there. He attends a speech by Vladimir Lenin and sees his friends cut down during a protest by government troops.
14	8	Young Indiana Jones and the Scandal of 1920 (Note: This feature-length episode consisted of "New York, June 1920" and "New York, July 1920.")	Syd Macartney	Jonathan Hales	April 3, 1993	9.5
The 20-year-old Indy goes to New York City and works in theatre, meeting George Gershwin and other Tin Pan Alley composers and producers of Broadway shows including George White's Scandals. Meanwhile, he tries to date three women simultaneously.
15	9	"Vienna, November 1908"	Bille August	Story by : George Lucas; Teleplay by : Matthew Jacobs	April 10, 1993	6.9
The 9-year-old Indy meets young Princess Sophie of Austria-Hungary. In love for the first time, he asks the advice of eminent psychology professors Sigmund Freud, Carl Jung, and Alfred Adler, then runs the gauntlet against her disapproving father, Archduke Franz Ferdinand.
16	10	"Northern Italy, June 1918"	Bille August	Jonathan Hales	April 17, 1993	7.0
Working to get Austrian troops to surrender in the Alps bordering Austria and Italy, Indy also courts the love of the beautiful Giulietta and strives to best her other suitor, Ernest Hemingway.
17	11	Young Indiana Jones and the Phantom Train of Doom (Note: This feature-length episode consisted of "German East Africa, November 1916 (1)" and "German East Africa, November 1916 (2).")	Peter MacDonald	Frank Darabont	June 5, 1993	7.3
Indy and Remy leave the war in Europe behind by joining Belgium's African campaign and are automatically promoted to Lieutenants when they disembark in British East Africa. After getting lost, they become involved in a British mission of the Royal Fusiliers to destroy a German rail gun and later help in the (temporary) capture of Paul von Lettow-Vorbeck, commander of German troops in the region.
18	12	"Ireland, April 1916"	Gillies MacKinnon	Jonathan Hales	June 12, 1993	5.3
Indy and Remy work aboard a ship as they sail from Mexico to Ireland on their way to London to join the war. In Dublin, Indy meets a girl called Maggie, her brother Seán Lemass, and her friend Nuala, then learns some things from local playwright Seán O'Casey. Indy and Seán take a disliking to each other even after Maggie dumps him when she finds out Indy isn't an American millionaire after all, and Indy gets into a fight with Seán before they see the pointlessness of fighting and become friends. The Easter Rising breaks out and, though most of the rebels are shot, Seán is imprisoned.
19	13	"Paris, September 1908"	René Manzor	Story by : George Lucas; Teleplay by : Reg Gadney	June 19, 1993	5.7
Indy meets the young Norman Rockwell and Pablo Picasso while exploring the artistic subcultures of Paris.
20	14	"Peking, March 1910"	Gavin Millar	Story by : George Lucas; Teleplay by : Rosemary Anne Sisson	June 26, 1993	5.6
Indy ventures into the Chinese countryside with his mother and tutor Miss Seymour. The young Indy falls dangerously ill, but there is no medical help available other than the traditional Chinese medical practitioners in the area.
21	15	"Benares, January 1910"	Deepa Mehta	Story by : George Lucas; Teleplay by : Jonathan Hensleigh	July 3, 1993	5.4
The Joneses go to India, where Indy meets the young Krishnamurti and Miss Seymour has strong disagreements with the Theosophical Society's Annie Besant.
22	16	"Paris, October 1916"	Nicolas Roeg	Story by : George Lucas; Teleplay by : Carrie Fisher	July 10, 1993	4.0
Indy and Remy are lucky to receive two weeks of leave from the trenches thanks to string-pulling by noteworthy friends of Indy's father. They are both excited to head off to Paris, where Indy meets dancer Mata Hari and has a romance with her. He is arrested and questioned by French police, as Mata Hari is suspected of being a spy.
23	17	"Istanbul, September 1918"	Mike Newell	Rosemary Anne Sisson	July 17, 1993	4.5
Posing as a Swedish journalist, Indy tries to convince Turkish general Mustafa Kemal to form a separate peace with the Allies instead of the Germans. His mission becomes jeopardized when he learns there is a traitor codenamed "The Wolf" in his spy network. To complicate matters, Indy himself has fallen for Molly Walder, a young American working at a Turkish orphanage, despite lying to her about his identity.
24	18	"Paris, May 1919"	David Hare	Jonathan Hales	July 24, 1993	4.6
The war has ended but the Treaty of Versailles is being thrashed out at the Paris Peace Conference, where Indy works as a translator and helps a young waiter gain an audience to advocate for Vietnamese causes.
25	19	"Florence, May 1908"	Mike Newell	Jule Selbo	Unaired	N/A
Italian composer Giacomo Puccini becomes infatuated with Anna, Indy's mother, and pursues her romantically.
26	20	"Prague, August 1917"	Robert Young	Gavin Scott	Unaired	N/A
Indy becomes entangled in a maddening web of bureaucracy and meets Franz Kafka while on assignment in Prague.
27	21	"Palestine, October 1917"	Simon Wincer	Frank Darabont	Unaired	N/A
Indy is reunited with T. E. Lawrence and sent in disguise to infiltrate the ancient city of Beersheba on the eve of a battle to capture it.
28	22	"Transylvania, January 1918"	Dick Maas	Jonathan Hensleigh	Unaired	N/A
Indy is sent from Venice to follow after three agents who disappeared while investigating General Mattias Targo, who may be a reincarnation of Vlad the Impaler.

=== TV films (1994–96) ===
Four television films aired on The Family Channel from 1994 to 1996. No "Old Indy" bookend segments were filmed for the television films, although Sean Patrick Flanery bookended Young Indiana Jones: Travels with Father.

Title	Directed by	Written by	Original release date
Young Indiana Jones and the Hollywood Follies (Note: This television movie consisted of "Hollywood, August 1920 (1)" and "Hollywood, August 1920 (2)".)	Michael Schultz	Jonathan Hales & Matthew Jacobs	October 15, 1994
On his summer break from college Indy ventures to Hollywood where he works in production on an Erich von Stroheim movie and then as a stunt man in an early John Ford western.
Young Indiana Jones and the Treasure of the Peacock's Eye (Note: This television movie consisted of "London/Egypt, November 1919" and "South Pacific, November 1919".)	Carl Schultz	Jule Selbo	January 15, 1995
WWI finally ends and Indy and Remy return to London. They immediately set forth to Egypt to try to find the legendary diamond the Peacock's Eye.
Young Indiana Jones and the Attack of the Hawkmen (Note: This television movie consisted of "Ravenelle, Germany, 1917" and "Ahlgorn, Germany 1917".)	Ben Burtt	Matthew Jacobs, Rosemary Anne Sisson & Ben Burtt	October 8, 1995
Indy becomes an aerial photographer at Lafayette Escadrille but is captured by the Red Baron. He then is sent into Germany on a spy mission to try to convince Anthony Fokker to defect to the French side of the war.
Young Indiana Jones: Travels with Father (Note: This television movie consisted of "Russia 1910" and "Athens 1910".)	Michael Schultz & Deepa Mehta	Frank Darabont, Matthew Jacobs & Jonathan Hales	June 16, 1996
Indy and his father travel through Greece and get into a bind in the monasteries of Meteora, then in Russia, Indy meets Leo Tolstoy.

== International variations ==
In some territories, certain episodes were split or combined under different titles.

Title	Original American variant
Two-hour Young Indiana Jones and the Great Escape (No Bookend)	''Somme, Early August 1916'' (Including Bookend with George Hall)
Two-hour Young Indiana Jones and the Great Escape (No Bookend)	''Germany, Mid-August 1916'' (Including Bookend with George Hall)
"Chicago, April 1920" (Including Bookend with George Hall)	Two-hour Young Indiana Jones and the Mystery of the Blues (Including Bookend with Harrison Ford)
"Chicago, May 1920" (Including Bookend with George Hall)	Two-hour Young Indiana Jones and the Mystery of the Blues (Including Bookend with Harrison Ford)
''New York, June 1920'' (Including Bookend with George Hall)	Two-hour Young Indiana Jones and the Scandal of 1920 (No Bookend)
''New York, July 1920" (Including Bookend with George Hall)	Two-hour Young Indiana Jones and the Scandal of 1920 (No Bookend)

== Film versions ==
In 1996, George Lucas hired T.M. Christopher to aid in re-editing the complete series into twenty-two feature-length episodes. The series was also retitled The Adventures of Young Indiana Jones. Each chapter contains two episodes, with most of the chapters arranged in chronological order. The scenes in which an older Indiana Jones reminisces are not included in these versions, except in "Chapter 20: Mystery of the Blues", which featured Harrison Ford as an older Indiana Jones in 1950.

Chapter	Title	Original episodes	Changes
1	My First Adventure (Note: This feature-length episode was released on VHS in 1999 and DVD in 2007.)	First half of Young Indiana Jones and the Curse of the Jackal (Egypt, May 1908)	Extended flashback in intro; The initial text narrated by Corey Carrier; In 1996, added connection scenes and full new segment, Tangiers, May 1908 (directed by Michael Schultz, written by Jule Selbo); T.E. Lawrence confronting Demetrios was shot in Tunisia in 1997
2	Passion for Life	"British East Africa, September 1909" + "Paris, September 1908"	Added connection and final scenes; Timeline "British East Africa, September 1909" edited to "September, 1908"
3	The Perils of Cupid	"Vienna, November 1908" + "Florence, May 1908"	Рick-up to intro and added connection scenes; Timeline "Florence, May 1908" edited to "November 1908"
4	Travels with Father	Young Indiana Jones: Travels with Father	The original scripts for the two TV episodes: "Russia, March 1909" and "Athens, July 1910"; Timeline edited in "March 1910"; Deleted bookend with Sean Patrick Flanery (expanded and added to Winds of Change); Added intro scenes
5	Journey of Radiance	"Benares, January 1910" + "Peking, March 1910"	Added connection and final scenes; Timeline "Benares, January 1910" edited to "March 1910"
6	Spring Break Adventure (Note: This feature-length episode aired on ABC in 2001, and was released on DVD in 2007.)	"Princeton, February 1916" + second half of Young Indiana Jones and the Curse of the Jackal (Mexico, March 1916)	Рick-up to intro and added connection scenes
7	Love's Sweet Song	"Ireland, April 1916" + "London, May 1916"	Рick-up to intro and added connection scenes
8	Trenches of Hell	"Somme, Early August 1916" + "Germany, Mid-August 1916"	Рick-up to intro
9	Demons of Deception	"Verdun, September 1916" + "Paris, October 1916"	Added intro and connection scenes
10	Phantom Train of Doom	Young Indiana Jones and the Phantom Train of Doom	No change, except deletion of Young Indiana Jones in title
11	Oganga, the Giver and Taker of Life	"German East Africa, December 1916" + "Congo, January 1917"	Extended intro
12	Attack of the Hawkmen	Young Indiana Jones and the Attack of the Hawkmen	No change, except deletion of Young Indiana Jones in title
13	Adventures in the Secret Service	"Austria, March 1917" + "Petrograd, July 1917."	Added intro and connection scenes; Timeline edited 'May / June / July 1917'
14	Espionage Escapades	"Barcelona, May 1917" + "Prague, August 1917".	Added intro and connection scenes; Timeline "Barcelona, May 1917" edited 'July 1917'
15	Daredevils of the Desert	"Palestine, October 1917"	Extended version of the original episode incorporating footage from The Lighthorsemen.
16	Tales of Innocence (Note: This feature-length episode was released on VHS in 1999 and DVD in 2008.)	"Northern Italy, June 1918"	Рick-up to intro; In 1996, added connection scenes and full new segment Morocco, November 1917 (directed by Michael Schultz, written by Jonathan Hales); Timeline "Northern Italy, June 1918" edited to "November 1917"
17	Masks of Evil (Note: This feature-length episode aired on ABC in 2001, and was released on DVD in 2008.)	"Istanbul, September 1918" + "Transylvania, January 1918"	Рick-up to intro and connection scenes; Timeline "Transylvania, January 1918" edited to "September 1918"
18	Treasure of the Peacock's Eye	Young Indiana Jones and the Treasure of the Peacock's Eye	No change except deletion of Young Indiana Jones in title
19	Winds of Change	"Paris, May 1919" + Young Indiana Jones: Travels with Father bookend (Princeton, May 1919)	Extended version of the original bookend entitled Princeton, May 1919; Added intro and connection scenes
20	Mystery of the Blues	Young Indiana Jones and the Mystery of the Blues	No change, except deletion of Young Indiana Jones in title
21	Scandal of 1920	Young Indiana Jones and the Scandal of 1920	No change, except deletion of Young Indiana Jones in title
22	Hollywood Follies	Young Indiana Jones and the Hollywood Follies	No change, except deletion of Young Indiana Jones in title

In 1999, only Chapters 6, 8, 10–13, 15–18, 20, and 22 were released on VHS in the "Complete Adventures of Indiana Jones" along with the re-release of the movie trilogy (credited as Chapters 23: Temple of Doom, 24: Raiders of the Lost Ark, and 25: Last Crusade). The movie trilogy also featured Chapter 18: Treasure of the Peacock's Eye as a bonus tape (Chapter 10: Phantom Train of Doom in the UK). It was promoted with the rest of the episodes set for release later in 2000, but this was canceled.

As of June 2023, all 22 episodes were streaming on Disney+, as a series called The Adventures of Young Indiana Jones. As of March 2025 they were no longer available on Disney+.

== Additional documentaries ==
Additionally ninety-four critically acclaimed documentaries about the real life historical figures, events, and subject matters in the series were made for the included supplements in the DVD releases from 2007 to 2008. They were co-produced by George Lucas and Rick McCallum.

== Unproduced episodes ==
When the series was cancelled in 1993, a number of episodes Lucas had intended to shoot never went into production.

- "Princeton, May 1905" was to involve Indy meeting Paul Robeson for the first time. (Note: Additional stories set in 1905 were planned as well, per Young Indy: Around the World.)
- "Russia, March 1909" was the basis for part of Young Indiana Jones: Travels with Father.
- "Geneva, May 1909"
- "Jerusalem, June 1909" was to involve Indy meeting Abner Ravenwood, who is trying to find a "sacred relic"—the Ark on the temple mount. In "Palestine, October 1917", Indy and his comrades suggest that they will be returning to this location by Christmas of 1917.
- "Stockholm, December 1909" was to be a homage to Swedish children's novel The Wonderful Adventures of Nils. Indiana Jones said Stockholm was his favorite city in Sweden in the "London, May 1916" episode.
- "Melbourne, March 1910" was to involve Indy meeting Harry Houdini and flying in an airplane with him. The events of this episode are mentioned in "Palestine, October 1917".
- "Tokyo, April 1910" was to involve a meeting between the young Indy and Prince Hirohito of Japan, the future Emperor Shōwa.
- "LeHavre, June 1916" was to involve Indy and Remy in basic training. When Remy is accused of murdering their drill sergeant, Indy defends him. The two also meet Jean Renoir, who teaches them how to fight in battles.
- "Flanders, July 1916" was to involve Indy, Remy and Jaques fighting in Flanders. The events of this episode are mentioned in "Trenches of Hell."
- "Berlin, Late August 1916" was to be a second-season episode that involved Indy escaping from prison and fleeing to Berlin, and would have been the third part in the Somme/Germany cycle following Indy's capture in Somme, his escape from prison, his escape from Germany itself. He has to decide between returning to the US (since the US isn't at war with Germany yet) or returning to the Belgian Army. He ultimately decides to return to the Belgian army. Indy would have met Sigrid Schultz.
- "Moscow, March 1918" was meant as a sequel to "Petrograd, July 1917." It would have involved Indy working with counter-revolutionary groups in order to allow the U.S. to take over.
- "Bombay, April 1919" was to involve Indy meeting Gandhi on his way back from his search for the Eye of the Peacock diamond, while Remy is still searching for the diamond. Remy and Indy fight about continuing the treasure search.
- "Buenos Aires, June 1919" was to involve Indy being robbed while trying to return to the U.S. where he works as a tutor. He then ends up in South America as a tutor.
- "Havana, December 1919" was to involve Indy and his father in Cuba. The episode would have revolved around integration issues and Indy and Henry Sr. seeing a black player outplay Babe Ruth.
- "Honduras, December 1920" was to involve Indy meeting Belloq for the first time and the two becoming friends. Belloq steals a crystal skull and sells it.
- "Alaska, June 1921" was to involve Indy studying Eskimos, and rushing to deliver medical supplies by dogsled in order to save a village. The events of this episode are foreshadowed in "Travels with Father".
- "Brazil, December 1921" was to involve Indy and Belloq in a search for a lost city, and meeting Percy Fawcett.
