= Ypres (film) =

1925 film directed by Walter Summers

- Directed by: Walter Summers
- Written by: Walter Summers
- Production company: British Instructional Films
- Distributed by: New Era Films
- Release date: October 1925
- Country: United Kingdom
- Languages: Silent; English intertitles

Ypres is a feature-length documentary produced in 1925 by British Instructional Films and directed by Walter Summers. The film consists entirely of reconstructions of the various Battles of Ypres performed by members of the British Armed Forces.

In 2010, Ypres was remastered with a new soundtrack for its DVD release.
