= Harry Bruce Woolfe =

English film producer and director

Harry Bruce Woolfe CBE (1880 in Marylebone, London – 1965 in Brighton) was an English film producer and occasional director who founded British Instructional Films. The company focused on documentaries, nature films, and works concerning World War I. He was himself a veteran so had an interest in using film to re-enact the war. This links to his being referred to as an "ardent imperialist" who intended to tell heroic stories of said war. In addition to work on war films he initiated the Secrets of Nature series.

== Select filmography ==
=== Director ===
- 1921 : The Battle Of Jutland
- 1923 : Armageddon
- 1924 : Zeebrugge
- 1925 : Sons Of The Sea
- 1932 : England Awake
- 1933 : Electricity: From Grid To Consumer
- 1933 : A Typical Rural Distribution System

=== Producer ===
- Armageddon (1923)
- Boadicea (1927)
- The Battles of Coronel and Falkland Islands (1927)
- Shooting Stars (1927)
- Bolibar (1928)
- Underground (1928)
- Chamber of Horrors (1929)
- The Runaway Princess (1929)
- The Celestial City (1929)
- Tell England (1931)
- Dance Pretty Lady (1931)
