= Cricklewood Studios =

British film studios from 1920 to 1938

- Interactive map of the Cricklewood Studios area
- Alternative names: Stoll Film Studios

General information
- Type: Film studios
- Location: Stoll Close, Cricklewood, London, United Kingdom
- Coordinates: 51.559834°N 0.221812°W
- Inaugurated: 1920
- Demolished: 1938
- Owner: Oswald Stoll (1920-1938)

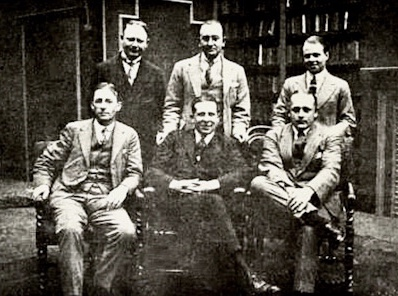
Stoll Pictures film directors, from left to right. Standing: Harold M. Shaw, Maurice Elvey, René Plaissetty. Seated: F. Martin Thornton, Jeffrey Bernerd (managing director), Sinclair Hill.

Cricklewood Studios, also known as the Stoll Film Studios, were British film studios located in Cricklewood, London which operated from 1920 to 1938. Run by Sir Oswald Stoll as the principal base for his newly formed Stoll Pictures, which also operated Surbiton Studios, the studio was the largest in the British Isles at that time. It was later used for the production of "quota quickies" (to meet the requirements of the Cinematograph Films Act 1927). In 1938, the studios were sold off for non-film use.

== Fictional studios ==
Cricklewood Greats was a 2012 spoof documentary created by Peter Capaldi for BBC Four, about a different and entirely fictional film production company, also set in Cricklewood, which he called Cricklewood Film Studios.

== See also ==
- List of Stoll Pictures films

== Bibliography ==
- Warren, Patricia. British Film Studios: An Illustrated History. Batsford, 2001.
