= Anthony Asquith =

English film director (1902–1968)

The Honourable Anthony Asquith
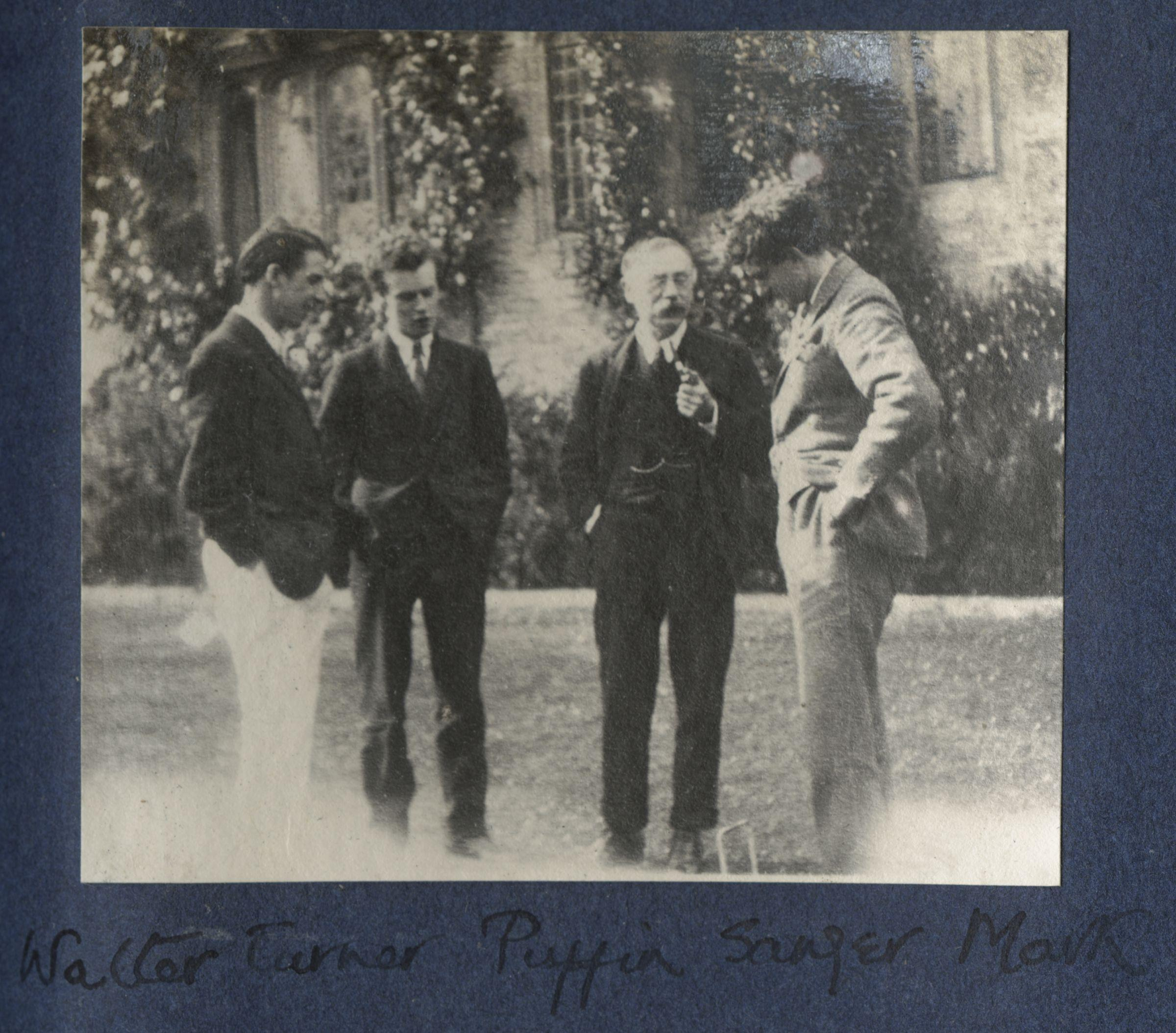
- Walter J. Turner, Asquith, Charles Percy Sanger and Mark Gertler, in a photo taken by Lady Ottoline Morrell
- Born: 9 November 1902; London, England
- Died: 20 February 1968 (aged 65); London, England
- Occupation: Film director
- Years active: 1927–1964
- Parents: H. H. Asquith; Margot Tennant

Anthony Asquith (/ˈæskwɪθ/; 9 November 1902 – 20 February 1968) was an English film director. He collaborated successfully with playwright Terence Rattigan on The Winslow Boy (1948) and The Browning Version (1951), among other adaptations. His other notable films include Pygmalion (1938), French Without Tears (1940), The Way to the Stars (1945) and a 1952 adaptation of Oscar Wilde's The Importance of Being Earnest.

== Life and career ==
Born in London on 9 November 1902, he was the son of H. H. Asquith, the Prime Minister from 1908 to 1916, and Margot Asquith, who was responsible for coming up with his family nickname, Puffin. He had four siblings, one of whom, a sister named Elizabeth, survived to adulthood; as well as five half-siblings from his father's first marriage. He was educated at Eaton House, Winchester College and Balliol College, Oxford.

The film industry was viewed as disreputable when Asquith was young, and according to the actor Jonathan Cecil, a family friend, Asquith entered this profession in order to escape his background. At the end of the 1920s, he began his career with the direction of four silent films, the last of which, A Cottage on Dartmoor, established his reputation with its meticulous and often emotionally moving frame composition. Pygmalion (1938) was based on the George Bernard Shaw play featuring Leslie Howard and Wendy Hiller.

He made several films for Edward Black at Gainsborough.

Asquith was a longtime friend and colleague of Terence Rattigan (they collaborated on ten films) and producer Anatole de Grunwald. His later films included Rattigan's The Winslow Boy (1948) and The Browning Version (1951), and Oscar Wilde's The Importance of Being Earnest (1952).

Asquith served as President of the Association of Cinematograph, Television and Allied Technicians and as a Governor of the British Film Institute.

Asquith was an alcoholic and, according to actor Jonathan Cecil, a repressed homosexual. He was working as director of The Shoes of the Fisherman when he fell ill. He died, months later, of cancer in London on 21 February 1968. He was buried at All Saints Churchyard, Sutton Courtenay, Berkshire, England.

== Filmography ==
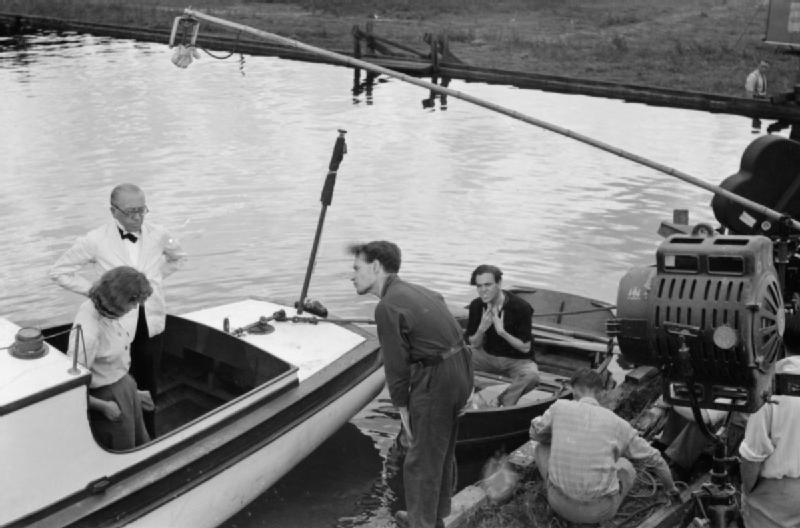
Asquith (centre) directs Peggy Ashcroft and Gordon Harker in Channel Incident, a short film about the evacuation of Dunkirk made for the Ministry of Information in 1940.

=== Feature film ===
- Shooting Stars (1927)
- Underground (1928)
- The Runaway Princess (1929)
- A Cottage on Dartmoor (1929)
- Tell England (1931)
- Dance Pretty Lady (1932)
- The Lucky Number (1933)
- Letting in the Sunshine (1933)
- Unfinished Symphony (1934)
- Moscow Nights (1935)
- Pygmalion (1938)
- French Without Tears (1940)
- Freedom Radio (1941)
- Quiet Wedding (1941)
- Cottage to Let (1941)
- Uncensored (1942)
- We Dive at Dawn (1943)
- The Demi-Paradise (1943)
- Fanny by Gaslight (1944)
- The Way to the Stars (1945)
- While the Sun Shines (1947)
- The Winslow Boy (1948)
- The Woman in Question (1950)
- The Browning Version (1951)
- The Importance of Being Earnest (1952)
- The Final Test (1953)
- The Net (1953)
- The Young Lovers (1954)
- Carrington V.C. (1955)
- On Such a Night (1955)
- Orders to Kill (1958)
- The Doctor's Dilemma (1958)
- Libel (1959)
- The Millionairess (1960)
- Two Living, One Dead (1961)
- Guns of Darkness (1962)
- The V.I.P.s (1963)
- The Yellow Rolls-Royce (1965)

=== Short film ===
- The Story of Papworth (1935)
- Channel Incident (1940)
- Rush Hour (1941)
- Two Fathers (1944)

Trade union offices
Preceded by New position	President of the Association of Cinematograph Technicians; 1937–1968	Succeeded by George Elvin
