= Welwyn Studios =

Film studios located in Welwyn

- Industry: Entertainment
- Founded: 1928; 97 years ago
- Defunct: 1950
- Headquarters: Welwyn Garden City, Hertfordshire, United Kingdom

Welwyn Studios was a British film studio located at Broadwater Road, Welwyn Garden City, in Hertfordshire. The facility operated between 1928 and 1950.

The studios were first constructed by British Instructional Films, and converted to make sound films shortly afterwards. The studios were later taken over by British International Pictures (from 1933, the Associated British Picture Corporation) who used them as the base for production of the company's supporting features as well as an overflow facility for the main complex at Elstree Studios. A number of films were also made there by independent companies.

Welwyn Garden City, anxious to develop the town with home industries, had initially approached A.E Bundy, who had bought British Instructional Films, from Sir Oswald Stoll. Bundy was offered the site on favourable terms and thousands of girders, left over after Stoll had enlarged his Surbiton Studios, further reduced the construction cost. H. Bruce Woolfe, producer of significant First World War documentaries, was the major figure at the studios. Welwyn was one of the pioneer studios in Britain - it produced one of the first British sound films, claimed to use the first back-projection shot - in Battles of the Coronel and Falkland Islands - , and was important in the production of British educational films. Woolfe made the popular Secrets of Nature series and war films, the afore-mentioned Battles of the Coronel and Falkland Islands and Tell England. Tell England, a story concerned with the Gallipoli landings, was directed by Anthony Asquith for British Instructional Films, and he was an artist who had been given his first chance at Welwyn studios.

Later films made at Welwyn included The Night Has Eyes (1942) with James Mason, Night Boat to Dublin (1945), Quiet Weekend (1946), Queen of Spades (1949), Cairo Road (1950), with Eric Portman, No Place For Jennifer (1950) with Leo Genn, and Last Holiday (1950). The studios were apparently not ideal for talkies and noises easily penetrated and made shooting difficult - the 5pm hooter from the nearby Nabisco shredded wheat factory and the adjacent main-line railway were amongst the distractions. Of the 194 employees in 1950, 46 transferred to Associated British Picture Corporation's studios at Elstree. The three-studio complex was sold in 1951 to a tobacco company.
