= British Instructional Films =

Former British film production company

British Instructional Films was a British film production company which operated between 1919 and 1932. The company's name is often abbreviated to BIF.

The company released a number of feature films during the late silent film and early sound eras, developing a reputation for making short documentaries. These included the Secrets of Nature series (1922-1933), consisting of 144 films. Filmmaker, historian and critic Paul Rotha described these in 1930 as "the sheet anchor of the British film industry".

In 1928, the company constructed Welwyn Studios. The company was later merged into the larger British International Pictures, which took over the running of the facility in Welwyn Garden City.

== Selected films ==
- Nelson (1926)
- The Battles of Coronel and Falkland Islands (1927)
- Shooting Stars (1927)
- Widecombe Fair (1928)
- Sin (1928)
- The Runaway Princess (1929)
- Lost Patrol (1929)
- Tell England (1931)

== Bibliography ==
- Low, Rachael, History of the British Film, 1918-1929 (George Allen & Unwin, 1971)
