= 1930 in British music =

This is a summary of 1930 in music in the United Kingdom.

== Events ==
- 8 February – Singer Sam Browne makes his first recording with Bert Ambrose's band on Decca.
- 5 April – 25-year-old Michael Tippett gives a concert at Oxted consisting entirely of his own works—a Concerto in D for flutes, oboe, horns and strings; settings for tenor of poems by Fry; Psalm in C for chorus and orchestra, again with a text by Fry; piano variations on the song "Jockey to the Fair"; and a string quartet.
- 7 June – The Daily Herald reports that Jack Hylton and his band sold nearly four million records in the previous year.
- 29 September – Roy Fox gives his first London performance.
- 22 October – The London-based BBC Symphony Orchestra gives its first concert in Queen's Hall, conducted by Adrian Boult.
- date unknown
  - The Joe Loss Orchestra is established.
  - Gerald Walcan Bright adopts the name "Geraldo" to further his career as a bandleader.
  - Songwriter Fred Godfrey and Irish tenor Tom Finglass form a short-lived variety act.
  - The Dagenham Girl Pipers are established, under the direction of Rev. Joseph Waddington Graves, the minister of Osborne Hall Congregational church.

== Popular music ==
- "By the Sleepy Lagoon", by Eric Coates
- "It isnae me", w. Sally Holmes, m. Edward Elgar
- "Someday I'll Find You", by Noël Coward
- "The White Dove" w. Clifford Grey m. Franz Lehár

== Classical music: new works ==
- Kenneth J. Alford – The Standard of St. George
- William Alwyn – Piano Concerto No. 1
- Arnold Bax – Winter Legends
- Arthur Bliss – Morning Heroes (oratorio)
- Edward Elgar – Pomp and Circumstance March No. 5 in C
- Gustav Holst – A Choral Fantasia
- John Ireland
  - Legend for piano and orchestra
  - Piano Concerto in E flat
- Peter Warlock – Carillon Carilla

== Film and Incidental music ==
- Ernest Irving – Birds of Prey

== Musical theatre ==
- 25 June – The Love Race opens at the Gaiety Theatre where it runs for 237 performances.
- 30 October – Nippy (music by Billy Mayerl; book and lyrics by Arthur Wimperis and Frank Eyton), starring Binnie Hale, opens at the Prince Edward Theatre and runs for 137 performances.

== Musical films ==
- Elstree Calling, starring Teddy Brown
- Harmony Heaven, starring Polly Ward
- Just for a Song, starring Lillian Hall-Davis, Roy Royston and Constance Carpenter.
- The Nipper, starring Betty Balfour

== Births ==
- 5 January – Saxa, Jamaican-born British saxophonist (died 2017)
- 17 February – Frank Wappat, singer and radio host (died 2014)
- 5 March – Isla Cameron, actress and folk singer (died 1980)
- 10 March – Jimmie Macgregor, folk singer
- 28 March – Elizabeth Bainbridge, operatic soprano
- 17 April – Chris Barber, jazz trombonist (died 2021)
- 4 May – Bill Eyden, jazz drummer (died 2004)
- 8 May – Heather Harper, operatic soprano (died 2019)
- 22 May – Kenny Ball, jazz trumpeter and bandleader (died 2013)
- 28 May – Julian Slade, composer (died 2006)
- 30 May – Gordon Langford, composer and arranger (died 2017)
- 1 June – Edward Woodward, actor and singer (died 2009)
- 10 July – Josephine Veasey, mezzo-soprano
- 20 July – Sally Ann Howes, actress and singer
- 27 July – Andy White, Scottish drummer (died 2015)
- 1 August – Lionel Bart, composer and lyricist (died 1999)
- 13 August – Bernard Manning, comedian and singer (died 2007)
- 12 October – Cyril Tawney, singer-songwriter (died 2005)
- 1 November – John Scott, conductor and composer
- 2 November – Peter Hope (also known as William Gardner), composer and arranger
- 1 December – Matt Monro, singer (died 1985)

== Deaths ==
- 17 February – Louise Kirkby Lunn, operatic contralto, 56
- 22 June – Mary Davies, singer, 75
- 13 November – Thomas Bulch, British-born Australian composer, 67
- 17 December – Peter Warlock, composer, 36

== See also ==
- 1930 in British television
- 1930 in the United Kingdom
- List of British films of 1930
