= List of British films of 1930 =

British films of 1930

A list of British films released in 1930.

== 1930 ==
=== A-K ===
Title	Director	Cast	Genre	Notes
After Many Years	Lawrence Huntington	Henry Thompson, Nancy Kenyon	Crime	
Alf's Button	W. P. Kellino	Tubby Edlin, Alf Goddard, Polly Ward	Comedy	
All Riot on the Western Front	Castleton Knight	Donald Calthrop, Gordon Harker, Alexander Field	Comedy short	Also known as The Cockney Spirit in the War No. 1
Almost a Honeymoon	Monty Banks	Clifford Mollison, Dodo Watts, Donald Calthrop	Comedy	
Amateur Night in London	Monty Banks	Billy Caryll, Duncan & Godfrey	Musical comedy short	
The American Prisoner	Thomas Bentley	Carl Brisson, Madeleine Carroll	Romantic drama	
Ashes	Frank Birch	Ernest Thesiger, Elsa Lanchester	Comedy short	
At the Villa Rose	Leslie S. Hiscott	Austin Trevor, Norah Baring	Thriller	
Bed and Breakfast	Walter Forde	Jane Baxter, Richard Cooper, Alf Goddard	Comedy	
Bedrock	Carlyle Blackwell	Carlyle Blackwell, Jane Baxter, Sunday Wilshin	Drama short	
Beyond the Cities	Carlyle Blackwell	Carlyle Blackwell, Edna Best	Drama	
Big Business	Oscar M. Sheridan	Frances Day, Barrie Oliver	Musical	
Birds of Prey	Basil Dean	C. Aubrey Smith, Dorothy Boyd, Frank Lawton	Thriller	
The Black Hand Gang	Monty Banks	Wee Georgie Wood, Violet Young	Comedy	
Borderline	Kenneth MacPherson	Paul Robeson, Eslanda Robeson	Drama	
Call of the Sea	Leslie S. Hiscott	Chrissie White, Henry Edwards, Chili Bouchier	Drama	
Canaries Sometimes Sing	Tom Walls	Tom Walls, Yvonne Arnaud, Cathleen Nesbitt	Comedy	
Caste	Campbell Gullan	Sebastian Shaw, Nora Swinburne, Hermione Baddeley	Comedy	
Children of Chance	Alexander Esway	Elissa Landi, John Stuart	Drama	
The Cockney Spirit in the War No. 2	Castleton Knight	Donald Calthrop, Alf Goddard, Alexander Field	Comedy short	
The Cockney Spirit in the War No. 3	Castleton Knight	Donald Calthrop, Alexander Field	Comedy short	
Comets	Sasha Geneen	Heather Thatcher, Billy Merson, Charles Laughton	Musical	
The Compulsory Husband	Monty Banks	Lillian Manton, Trilby Clark, Michael Powell	Comedy	
Cross Roads	Reginald Fogwell	Anne Grey, Percy Marmont	Drama	
The Dizzy Limit	Edward Dryhurst	Wallace Bosco	Comedy	
Downstream	Giuseppe Guarino	Chili Bouchier, Harold Huth	Drama	
Elstree Calling	Alfred Hitchcock, André Charlot, Jack Hulbert, Paul Murray	Teddy Brown, Helen Burnell, Donald Calthrop	Musical comedy	
Enter the Queen	Arthur Varney-Serrao	Richard Cooper, Doria March, Chili Bouchier	Comedy	
Escape	Basil Dean	Gerald du Maurier, Edna Best, Madeleine Carroll	Drama	
Eve's Fall	Monty Banks	John Stuart, Muriel Angelus, Donald Stuart	Musical short	
The Flame of Love	Richard Eichberg	Anna May Wong, John Longden, George Schnell	Musical melodrama	
Flames of Fear	Charles Barnett	John Argyle, Nancy Stratford	Drama	
French Leave	Jack Raymond	Madeleine Carroll, Sydney Howard, Henry Kendall	Comedy	
The Great Game	Jack Raymond	John Batten, Renee Clama	Sports	
Greek Street	Sinclair Hill	Sari Maritza, William Freshman	Musical	
Harmony Heaven	Thomas Bentley	Polly Ward, Stuart Hall	Musical	
The Hate Ship	Norman Walker	Jameson Thomas, Jean Colin	Crime	
His First Car	Monty Banks	George Clarke, Mamie Watson, Cyril Smith	Comedy short	
The House of the Arrow	Leslie S. Hiscott	Dennis Neilson-Terry, Benita Hume	Drama	
Infatuation	Sasha Geneen	Godfrey Tearle, Jeanne De Casalis	Romantic short	
The Jerry Builders	Monty Banks	George Graves, Barrie Oliver	Comedy short	
Journey's End	James Whale	Colin Clive, Ian Maclaren	World War I	Co-production with the US
Juno and the Paycock	Alfred Hitchcock	Barry Fitzgerald, Maire O'Neill	Drama	
Just for a Song	Gareth Gundrey	Roy Royston, Lillian Hall-Davis, Constance Carpenter	Musical	
Kissing Cup's Race	Castleton Knight	Stewart Rome, Madeleine Carroll	Drama	
Knowing Men	Elinor Glyn	Carl Brisson, Elissa Landi	Comedy	

=== L-Z ===
Title	Director	Cast	Genre	Notes
The Last Hour	Walter Forde	Stewart Rome, Richard Cooper	Comedy	
The Last Post	Dinah Shurey	John Longden, Frank Vosper	Drama	
Leave It to Me	George King	Robin Irvine, Dorothy Seacombe	Comedy short	
Les Deux Mondes	E. A. Dupont	Marie Glory, Max Maxudian	War drama	Co-production with France and Germany
Life's a Stage	Arthur Phillips	Frank Stanmore, Joy Windsor	Crime	
Lily of Killarney	George Ridgwell	Cecil Landau, Barbara Gott, Dennis Wyndham	Drama	
Lord Richard in the Pantry	Walter Forde	Richard Cooper, Marjorie Hume	Comedy	
The Loves of Robert Burns	Herbert Wilcox	Joseph Hislop, Eve Gray	Drama	
The Man from Chicago	Walter Summers	Bernard Nedell, Dodo Watts	Crime	
The Message of the Drum	Walter Creighton			
The Middle Watch	Norman Walker	Owen Nares, Jacqueline Logan	Comedy	
Murder!	Alfred Hitchcock	Herbert Marshall, Norah Baring	Mystery/thriller	
The Musical Beauty Shop	Monty Banks	Leonard Henry, Ethel Baird, Barrie Oliver, Syd Crossley	Musical comedy short	
Naughty Husbands	Geoffrey Benstead	Patrick Ludlow, Nigel Cope	Comedy	
The New Waiter	Monty Banks	Leonard Henry, Albert Rebla, Barrie Oliver	Musical comedy short	
Night Birds	Richard Eichberg	Jack Raine, Muriel Angelus	Crime	
The Night Porter	Sewell Collins	Donald Calthrop, Trilby Clark	Comedy	
The Nipper	Louis Mercanton	Betty Balfour, John Stuart	Musical comedy	
No Exit	Charles Saunders	John Stuart, Muriel Angelus	Comedy	
Not So Quiet on the Western Front	Monty Banks	Leslie Fuller, Mona Goya	Comedy	
O.K. Chief	Bernard Mainwaring	Frances Day, Walter Armitage	Comedy short	
An Obvious Situation	Giuseppe Guarino	Sunday Wilshin, Walter Sondes	Crime	
On Approval	Tom Walls	Tom Walls, Yvonne Arnaud	Comedy	
One Family	Walter Creighton	Douglas Beaumont, Sam Livesey	Adventure	
Painted Pictures	Charles Bennett	Haddon Mason, Winifred Evans	Drama	
The Price of Things	Elinor Glyn	Elissa Landi, Stewart Rome	Drama	
Raise the Roof	Walter Summers	Betty Balfour, Maurice Evans	Musical	
Red Aces	Edgar Wallace	Janice Adair, Muriel Angelus, Nigel Bruce	Crime	
Red Pearls	Walter Forde	Lillian Rich, Frank Perfitt	Crime	
The Road to Fortune	Arthur Varney	Guy Newall, Doria March	Drama	
Rookery Nook	Tom Walls	Tom Walls, Ralph Lynn	Comedy	
The Safe	Dave Aylott	Sam B. Wood, Bill Sawyer, Phyllis Carr	Drama short	
The School for Scandal	Maurice Elvey	Basil Gill, Madeleine Carroll	Comedy	
Should a Doctor Tell?	H. Manning Haynes	Basil Gill, Norah Baring	Drama	
A Sister to Assist 'Er	George Dewhurst	Barbara Gott, Polly Emery	Comedy	
Sleeping Partners	Seymour Hicks	Seymour Hicks, Edna Best	Comedy	
Song of Soho	Harry Lachman	Carl Brisson, Edna Davies	Musical	
Spanish Eyes	G. B. Samuelson	Donald Calthrop, Anthony Ireland	Musical	
Splinters	Jack Raymond	Hal Jones, Reg Stone	Musical comedy	
The Squeaker	Edgar Wallace	Percy Marmont, Anne Grey, Gordon Harker	Crime	
Stranger Than Fiction		George Foley, Nell Emerald	Short	
Suspense	Walter Summers	Mickey Brantford, Cyril McLaglen	War	
Thread O'Scarlet	Peter Godfrey	Ben Field, William Freshman, Wally Patch, Norman Shelley	Crime Short	
Three Men in a Cart	Arthur Phillips	Frank Stanmore, Joan Morgan	Comedy	
Tons of Money	Tom Walls	Ralph Lynn, Yvonne Arnaud	Comedy	
Too Many Crooks	George King	Laurence Olivier, Dorothy Boyd, Ellen Pollock	Comedy short	
Warned Off	Walter West	Tony Wylde, Chili Bouchier	Drama	
Why Sailors Leave Home	Monty Banks	Leslie Fuller, Eve Gray	Comedy	
Windjammer	J. O. C. Orton	Hal Gordon, Roy Travers	Drama	
White Cargo	J. B. Williams	Leslie Faber, Maurice Evans	Drama	
Why Sailors Leave Home	Monty Banks	Leslie Fuller, Eve Gray	Comedy	
Windjammer	J. O. C. Orton	Hal Gordon, Roy Travers	Adventure	
Wolves	Albert de Courville	Charles Laughton, Dorothy Gish	Crime	
You'd Be Surprised!	Walter Forde	Walter Forde, Joy Windsor	Musical comedy	
Young Woodley	Thomas Bentley	Madeleine Carroll, Frank Lawton	Drama	

== See also ==
- 1930 in British music
- 1930 in British television
- 1930 in film
- 1930 in the United Kingdom
