= 1930 in British television =

This is a list of British television related events in 1930.

== Events ==
Month	Day	Event
March	31	John Logie Baird installs a television receiver at the Prime Minister of the United Kingdom's residence in London.
July	14	First television drama broadcast, a production of Luigi Pirandello's The Man With the Flower in His Mouth by the BBC from Baird's studios at 133 Long Acre, London, directed by Val Gielgud.
November	5	Baird television transmissions at the Hairdressing Fair of Fashion include the world's first television commercial, for the Eugène Method of permanent hair waving.

== Births ==
- 28 January – Roy Clarke, comedy writer
- 29 January – John Junkin, comedy actor and screenwriter (died 2006)
- 9 May – Joan Sims, actress (died 2001)
- 1 June – Edward Woodward, actor (died 2009)
- 4 June – Bill Treacher, actor (died 2022)
- 17 July – Ray Galton, comedy writer (died 2018)
- 18 July – Burt Kwouk, actor (died 2016)
- 25 August – Sean Connery, Scottish-born screen actor (died 2020)
- 28 August – Windsor Davies, comedy actor (died 2019)
- 24 September – Angelo Muscat, Maltese-born character actor (died 1977)
- 19 October – Mavis Nicholson, Welsh presenter (died 2022)
- 28 October – Philip Saville, director (died 2016)
- 31 October – Eddie Braben, comedy scriptwriter (died 2013)
- 7 November – Peter Woods, journalist and newsreader (died 1995)
- 4 December – Ronnie Corbett, Scottish-born comedy performer (died 2016)
- 8 December – Stan Richards, actor (Emmerdale) (died 2005)

== See also ==
- 1930 in British music
- 1930 in the United Kingdom
- List of British films of 1930
