= 1930 in film =

The following is an overview of 1930 in film, including significant events, a list of films released and notable births and deaths.

== Events ==
- February 21: Anna Christie, Greta Garbo's first sound film is released, it grosses $1.5 million.
- February 23: Silent screen legend Mabel Normand dies at the age of 37 in Monrovia, California after a lengthy battle with tuberculosis.
- March 10: Release of Goodbye Argentina (Adiós Argentina), the first Argentine film with a (musical) soundtrack. Ada Cornaro has her first starring role and Libertad Lamarque makes her film debut.
- April 6: William Fox sells his interest in Fox Film for $18 million and Harley L. Clarke becomes president.
- May 27: Howard Hughes' epic film Hell's Angels premieres at Grauman's Chinese Theatre in Hollywood and features Jean Harlow in her first major role as well as some impressive aerial sequences. Although not a financial success upon its release due to its bloated budget, the film is acclaimed by critics and launches Harlow as one of the 1930s' biggest stars.
- August 9: Cartoon character Betty Boop appears for the first time on screen, in the animated film Dizzy Dishes.
- September 3: The Hollywood Reporter is first published.
- September 19: The Love Parade receives a record six Academy Award nominations.
- November 1: The Big Trail featuring a young John Wayne in his first starring role is released in both 35mm and a very early form of 70mm film. It is the first large scale big-budget film of the sound era, costing over $2 million. The film is praised for its aesthetic quality and realism that will not become commonplace until many decades later. However, due to the new film format and the film's release during the Great Depression, the film will go on to become a financial failure at the box office.

== Academy Awards ==
- Best Picture: All Quiet on the Western Front – Universal Pictures
- Best Director: Lewis Milestone – All Quiet on the Western Front
- Best Actor: George Arliss – Disraeli
- Best Actress: Norma Shearer – The Divorcee

== Top-grossing films (U.S.) ==
The top ten 1930 released films by box office gross in North America are as follows:

Highest-grossing films of 1930
Rank	Title	Distributor	Domestic rentals
1	Whoopee!	United Artists	$2,655,000
2	Check and Double Check	RKO	$1,751,000
3	All Quiet on the Western Front	Universal	$1,634,000
4	Hell's Angels	United Artists	$1,600,000
5	The Big House	MGM	$1,279,000
6	Common Clay	Fox Film	$1,246,000
7	Min and Bill	MGM	$1,223,000
8	Song o' My Heart	Fox Film	$1,200,000
9	Son of the Gods	First National	$1,069,000
10	The Dawn Patrol	First National	$1,061,000

== Notable films released in 1930 ==
United States unless stated

=== A ===
- Abi and Rabi, starring and directed by Ovanes Ohanian – (Iran)
- Abraham Lincoln, directed by D. W. Griffith, starring Walter Huston and Una Merkel
- L'Âge d'Or (The Golden Age), directed by Luis Buñuel – (France)
- All Quiet on the Western Front, directed by Lewis Milestone, starring Lew Ayres and Louis Wolheim
- Alraune, directed by Richard Oswald – (Germany)
- Animal Crackers, directed by Victor Heerman, starring the Marx Brothers
- Anna Christie, directed by Clarence Brown, starring Greta Garbo
- The Arizona Kid, directed by Alfred Santell, starring Warner Baxter and Carole Lombard

=== B ===
- The Bad Man, directed by Clarence G. Badger, starring Walter Huston
- The Bat Whispers, directed by Roland West, starring Chester Morris and Una Merkel
- The Benson Murder Case, directed by Frank Tuttle, starring William Powell
- Big Boy, directed by Alan Crosland, starring Al Jolson
- The Big House, directed by George Hill, starring Chester Morris, Wallace Beery, Lewis Stone and Robert Montgomery
- The Big Pond, directed by Hobart Henley, starring Maurice Chevalier and Claudette Colbert
- The Big Trail, directed by Raoul Walsh, starring John Wayne
- Billy the Kid, directed by King Vidor, starring Johnny Mack Brown and Wallace Beery
- Der blaue Engel (The Blue Angel), directed by Josef von Sternberg, starring Marlene Dietrich and Emil Jannings – (Germany)
- The Blood of a Poet (Le Sang d'un Poète), directed by Jean Cocteau – (France)
- Borderline, directed by Kenneth Macpherson, starring Paul Robeson – (GB)
- Bride of the Regiment (lost), directed by John Francis Dillon, starring Walter Pidgeon
- Bright Lights, directed by Michael Curtiz

=== C ===
- Call of the Flesh, directed by Charles Brabin, starring Ramón Novarro
- The Cat Creeps (lost), directed by Rupert Julian, starring Helen Twelvetrees
- Chasing Rainbows, directed by Charles Reisner, starring Charles King, Bessie Love, Jack Benny and Marie Dressler
- Check and Double Check, directed by Melville W. Brown, starring Amos 'n' Andy
- Children of Pleasure, directed by Harry Beaumont
- City Girl, directed by F. W. Murnau, starring Mary Duncan and Charles Farrell
- Common Clay (lost), directed by Victor Fleming, starring Constance Bennett and Lew Ayres
- The Cuckoos, directed by Paul Sloane, starring Wheeler & Woolsey

=== D ===
- Danger Lights, directed by George B. Seitz, starring Louis Wolheim, Robert Armstrong and Jean Arthur
- The Dawn Patrol, directed by Howard Hawks, starring Richard Barthelmess, Douglas Fairbanks Jr. and Neil Hamilton
- The Devil to Pay!, directed by George Fitzmaurice, starring Ronald Colman, Loretta Young and Myrna Loy
- The Divorcee, directed by Robert Z. Leonard, starring Norma Shearer, Chester Morris, Conrad Nagel and Robert Montgomery
- Dixiana, directed by Luther Reed, starring Bebe Daniels and Wheeler & Woolsey
- Doughboys, directed by Edward Sedgwick, starring Buster Keaton and Cliff Edwards

=== E ===
- Earth (Zemlya), directed by Alexander Dovzhenko – (U.S.S.R.)
- Elstree Calling, directed by Adrian Brunel and Alfred Hitchcock – (GB)
- Escape!, directed by Basil Dean, starring Gerald du Maurier and Edna Best – (GB)

=== F ===
- Fast and Loose, directed by Fred C. Newmeyer, starring Miriam Hopkins, Carole Lombard and Frank Morgan
- Feet First, directed by Clyde Bruckman, starring Harold Lloyd
- The Florodora Girl, directed by Harry Beaumont, starring Marion Davies
- The Flute Concert of Sanssouci (Das Flötenkonzert von Sans-souci), directed by Gustav Ucicky, starring Otto Gebühr – (Germany)
- Follow Thru, directed by Laurence Schwab and Lloyd Corrigan, starring Charles 'Buddy' Rogers
- Free and Easy, directed by Edward Sedgwick, starring Buster Keaton, Anita Page and Robert Montgomery

=== G ===
- The Girl Said No, directed by Sam Wood, starring William Haines, Leila Hyams and Marie Dressler
- Good News, directed by Nick Grinde, starring Bessie Love and Cliff Edwards

=== H ===
- Hell's Angels, directed by Howard Hughes, starring Jean Harlow and Ben Lyon
- Her Man, directed by Tay Garnett, starring Helen Twelvetrees
- High Society Blues, directed by David Butler, starring Janet Gaynor and Charles Farrell
- Hold Everything (lost), directed by Roy Del Ruth, starring Joe E. Brown
- Holiday, directed by Edward H. Griffith, starring Ann Harding and Mary Astor

=== I ===
- Imperial and Royal Field Marshal (C. a k. polní maršálek), directed by Karel Lamač – (Czechoslovakia)
- Ingagi, directed by William S. Campbell

=== J ===
- Journey's End, directed by James Whale, starring Colin Clive – (GB/US)
- Just Imagine, directed by David Butler

=== K ===
- King of Jazz, directed by John Murray Anderson, starring Paul Whiteman, John Boles and Laura La Plante

=== L ===
- Ladies Love Brutes, directed by Rowland V. Lee, starring George Bancroft, Mary Astor and Fredric March
- Ladies of Leisure, directed by Frank Capra, starring Barbara Stanwyck
- A Lady to Love, directed by Victor Sjöström, starring Vilma Bánky and Edward G. Robinson
- Leathernecking, directed by Edward F. Cline, starring Irene Dunne
- Let's Go Native, directed by Leo McCarey, starring Jack Oakie and Jeanette MacDonald
- Liliom, directed by Frank Borzage, starring Charles Farrell and Rose Hobart
- Lightnin', directed by Henry King, starring Will Rogers, Louise Dresser and Joel McCrea
- Loose Ankles, directed by Ted Wilde, starring Loretta Young and Douglas Fairbanks Jr.
- Lord Byron of Broadway, directed by Harry Beaumont and William Nigh
- The Lottery Bride, directed by Paul L. Stein, starring Jeanette MacDonald, Joe E. Brown and ZaSu Pitts

=== M ===
- Madam Satan, directed by Cecil B. DeMille, starring Kay Johnson
- Mamba, directed by Albert S. Rogell, starring Jean Hersholt and Eleanor Boardman
- Mammy, directed by Michael Curtiz, starring Al Jolson
- The Man from Blankley's (lost), directed by Alfred E. Green, starring John Barrymore and Loretta Young
- A Man from Wyoming, directed by Rowland V. Lee, starring Gary Cooper
- Manslaughter, directed by George Abbott, starring Claudette Colbert and Fredric March
- Min and Bill, directed by George Hill, starring Marie Dressler and Wallace Beery
- Montana Moon, directed by Malcolm St. Clair, starring Joan Crawford and Johnny Mack Brown
- Monte Carlo, directed by Ernst Lubitsch, starring Jack Buchanan and Jeanette MacDonald
- Morocco, directed by Josef von Sternberg, starring Gary Cooper, Marlene Dietrich and Adolphe Menjou
- Murder!, directed by Alfred Hitchcock, starring Herbert Marshall – (GB)
- The Mystery of the Yellow Room (Le Mystère de la chambre jaune), directed by Marcel L'Herbier – (France)

=== N ===
- Nerone (lost), directed by Alessandro Blasetti, starring Ettore Petrolini – (Italy)
- Night Birds, directed by Richard Eichberg – (Germany/GB)
- Not So Dumb, directed by King Vidor, starring Marion Davies

=== O ===
- The Other (Der Andere), directed by Robert Wiene – (Germany)
- Outside the Law, directed by Tod Browning, starring Edward G. Robinson and Mary Nolan

=== P ===
- Paid, directed by Sam Wood, starring Joan Crawford, Robert Armstrong and Marie Prevost
- Paramount on Parade, an all-star revue
- Peacock Alley, directed by Marcel de Sano, starring Mae Murray
- People on Sunday (Menschen am Sonntag), directed by Robert Siodmak and Edgar G. Ulmer – (Germany)
- Prix de Beauté (Beauty Prize), directed by Augusto Genina, starring Louise Brooks – (France)
- Puttin' On the Ritz, directed by Edward Sloman, starring Harry Richman and Joan Bennett

=== Q ===
- Queen High, directed by Fred C. Newmeyer, starring Charles Ruggles, Frank Morgan, and Ginger Rogers

=== R ===
- Raffles, directed by George Fitzmaurice, starring Ronald Colman and Kay Francis
- Reaching for the Moon, directed by Edmund Goulding, starring Douglas Fairbanks and Bebe Daniels
- Renegades, directed by Victor Fleming, starring Warner Baxter, Myrna Loy and Noah Beery Sr.
- The Return of Dr. Fu Manchu, directed by Rowland V. Lee, starring Warner Oland, Jean Arthur and Neil Hamilton
- The Rogue Song (lost), directed by Lionel Barrymore, starring Lawrence Tibbett
- The Royal Family of Broadway, directed by George Cukor and Cyril Gardner, starring Fredric March and Mary Brian

=== S ===
- Show Girl in Hollywood, directed by Mervyn LeRoy, starring Alice White
- Son of the Gods, directed by Frank Lloyd. starring Richard Barthelmess and Constance Bennett
- Song o' My Heart, directed by Frank Borzage, starring John McCormack
- The Song of Love (La canzone dell'amore), directed by Gennaro Righelli – (Italy)
- Soup to Nuts, directed by Benjamin Stoloff, starring Ted Healy and His Stooges
- Spring Is Here, directed by John Francis Dillon
- St. Jorgen's Day (Prazdnik svyatogo Yorgena), directed by Yakov Protazanov – (U.S.S.R.)
- Street of Chance, directed by John Cromwell, starring William Powell, Jean Arthur and Kay Francis
- Sweet Kitty Bellairs, directed by Alfred E. Green, starring Claudia Dell and Walter Pidgeon

=== T ===
- Tarakanova, directed by Raymond Bernard – (France)
- The Temporary Widow, directed by Gustav Ucicky, starring Lilian Harvey and Laurence Olivier – (GB/Germany)
- Three Faces East, directed by Roy Del Ruth, starring Constance Bennett and Erich von Stroheim
- The Three from the Filling Station (Die Drei von der Tankstelle), directed by Wilhelm Thiele, starring Lilian Harvey and Willy Fritsch – (Germany)
- Tom Sawyer, directed by John Cromwell, starring Jackie Coogan
- True to the Navy, directed by Frank Tuttle, starring Clara Bow and Fredric March
- Two Hearts in Waltz Time (Zwei Herzen im ¾ Takt), directed by Géza von Bolváry – (Germany)

=== U ===
- Under a Texas Moon, directed by Michael Curtiz
- Under the Roofs of Paris (Sous les toits de Paris), directed by René Clair – (France)
- The Unholy Three, directed by Jack Conway, starring Lon Chaney and Lila Lee

=== V ===
- The Vagabond King, directed by Ludwig Berger, starring Dennis King and Jeanette MacDonald
- Viejo smoking (Old Smoking Jacket), directed by Eduardo Morera – (Argentina)

=== W ===
- The W Plan, directed by Victor Saville, starring Brian Aherne and Madeleine Carroll – (GB)
- Wara Wara, directed by José Maria Velasco Maidana – (Bolivia)
- Way for a Sailor, directed by Sam Wood, starring John Gilbert, Wallace Beery and Leila Hyams
- Westfront 1918 (Vier von der Infanterie), directed by G. W. Pabst – (Germany)
- Whoopee!, directed by Thornton Freeland, starring Eddie Cantor

=== Y ===
- Young Man of Manhattan, directed by Monta Bell, starring Claudette Colbert, Norman Foster, Charles Ruggles and Ginger Rogers
- Young Woodley, directed by Thomas Bentley, starring Madeleine Carroll – (GB)

=== Z ===
- Zaynab, directed by Mohammed Karim, starring Bahiga Hafez and Zaki Rostom – (Egypt)

== Serials ==
- Across the World with Mr & Mrs Martin Johnson
- Hunting Tigers in India
- The Indians Are Coming
- The Jade Box
- The Lightning Express
- The Lone Defender, starring Rin Tin Tin
- Terry of the Times
- The Voice from the Sky

== Short film series ==
- Our Gang (1922–1944)
- Laurel and Hardy (1921–1943)
- Dogville Comedies (1929-1931)
- Crying for the Carolines (5 min)

== Animated short film series ==
- Felix the Cat (1919-1936)
  - April Maze (7 min)
  - Skulls and Sculls
  - Hootchy Cootchy Parlais Vous
- Aesop's Film Fables (1921–1933)
- Krazy Kat (1925–1940)
- Mickey Mouse (1928–1953)
  - Just Mickey (7 min)
  - The Barnyard Concert (6 min)
  - The Cactus Kid
  - The Fire Fighters
  - The Shindig
  - The Chain Gang
  - The Gorilla Mystery
  - The Picnic
  - Pioneer Days
- Oswald the Lucky Rabbit
- Silly Symphonies
  - Summer
  - Autumn
  - The Cannibal Capers
  - Night
  - Frolicking Fish
  - Arctic Antics
  - Midnight in a Toyshop
  - Monkey Melodies
  - Winter
  - Playful Pan
- Screen Songs (1929–1938)
  - Prisoner's Song (8 min)
- Talkartoons (1929–1932)
  - Dizzy Dishes (first Betty Boop cartoon)
  - Barnacle Bill (second Betty Boop cartoon)
- Looney Tunes (1930–1969)
  - Sinkin' in the Bathtub
  - Congo Jazz
  - Hold Anything
  - The Booze Hangs High
  - Box Car Blues
- Flip the Frog (1930–1933)
  - The Village Barber (7 min)
  - Puddle Pranks (7 min)
  - Cuckoo Murder Case (8 min)
  - Little Orphan Willie
  - Flying Fists (7 min)
- Terrytoons (1930–1964)
- Toby the Pup (1930–1931)
  - The Museum
  - Toby the Miner
  - Toby the Fiddler
  - Toby the Showman
  - The Bug House
- "Beary Bear" (1930–1949)
  - "Experiment Gone Wrong"
  - "Hickory's Hijinks"
  - "Piano Problems"
  - "Oh Deer!"
  - "Bushy the Lion"
  - "Trouble in Paris"

== Births ==
- January 1 – Frederick Wiseman, American documentarian and film editor (died 2026)
- January 3
  - Mara Corday, American showgirl, model and actress (died 2025)
  - Robert Loggia, American actor (died 2015)
  - Barbara Stuart, American actress (died 2011)
- January 6 – Professor Tanaka, American wrestler, boxer, actor and martial artist (died 2000)
- January 10 – Roy E. Disney, American film executive and Walt Disney's nephew (died 2009)
- January 11
  - Angela Paton, American actress (died 2016)
  - Rod Taylor, Australian actor (died 2015)
- January 12 – Edgar Landsbury, British-born Irish-American producer (died 2024)
- January 13 – Frances Sternhagen, American actress (died 2023)
- January 19 – Tippi Hedren, American actress
- January 20 – Henry Woolf, British actor (died 2021)
- January 24 – Terence Bayler, New Zealand actor (died 2016)
- January 29 – Benjamin Tatar, American actor (died 2012)
- January 30 – Gene Hackman, American actor (died 2025)
- February 6 – Allan King, Canadian director (died 2009)
- February 10 – Robert Wagner, American actor
- February 16 – Ricou Browning, American film director, actor, cinematographer and stuntman (died 2023)
- February 20 – Patricia Smith, American actress (died 2011)
- February 22 – Giuliano Montaldo, Italian film director, screenwriter and actor (died 2023)
- February 24 – Barbara Lawrence, American actress, model (died 2013)
- February 27 – Joanne Woodward, American actress
- March 1 - Raymond St. Jacques, American actor, director and producer (died 1990)
- March 3 - Alfredo Alcón, Argentine actor (died 2014)
- March 6 – Allison Hayes, American actress (died 1977)
- March 9 - Taina Elg, Finnish actress and dancer (died 2025)
- March 12 – Scoey Mitchell, American actor, writer and director (died 2022)
- March 13 – Harrison Young, American character actor (died 2005)
- March 16 – Lotte Ledl, Austrian actress (died 2025)
- March 17 - Patrick Hines, American actor (died 1985)
- March 21 – Pauline Stroud, British actress (died 2022)
- March 24 – Steve McQueen, American actor (died 1980)
- March 29 – Naser Malek Motiei, Iranian actor, director (died 2018)
- March 30
  - John Astin, American actor
  - Estella Blain, French actress (died 1982)
- April 1 – Grace Lee Whitney, American actress (died 2015)
- April 5
  - Mary Costa, American singer and actress
  - Marietta Marich, American actress, singer, writer, stage director and television host (died 2017)
- April 7 – Andrew Sachs, German-born British actor and writer (died 2016)
- April 10 - Lee Weaver, American actor (died 2025)
- April 13 – Roger Browne, American actor (died 2024)
- April 14 – Bradford Dillman, American actor (died 2018)
- April 18 – Clive Revill, New Zealand actor (died 2025)
- April 19 – Dick Sargent, American actor (died 1994)
- April 21 – Silvana Mangano, Italian actress (died 1989)
- April 23 – Alan Oppenheimer, American actor
- April 24 – Richard Donner, American director and producer (died 2021)
- April 25 – Paul Mazursky, American director and actor (died 2014)
- April 28 – Carolyn Jones, American actress (died 1983)
- April 29 – Jean Rochefort, French actor (died 2017)
- May 4
  - Lois de Banzie, Scottish-born American actress (died 2021)
  - Doris Leader Charge, American actress (died 2001)
- May 5 – Will Hutchins, American actor (died 2025)
- May 9 – Joan Sims, English actress (died 2001)
- May 11 – Bud Ekins, American actor and stuntman (died 2007)
- May 18 – Tseng Chang, Hong Kong actor and director (died 2021)
- May 20 - James McEachin, American actor (died 2025)
- May 31 – Clint Eastwood, American actor, director and producer
- June 1
  - Pat Corley, American actor (died 2006)
  - Edward Woodward, English actor and singer (died 2009)
- June 4
  - Edward Kelsey, English actor (died 2019)
  - Morgana King, American jazz singer and actress (died 2018)
  - Bill Treacher, English actor (died 2022)
- June 9 – Terry Norris, Australian actor (died 2023)
- June 15 – Odile Versois, French actress (died 1980)
- June 19
  - Gena Rowlands, American actress (died 2024)
  - Diana Sowle, American actress (died 2018)
- June 25 – George Murdock, American character actor (died 2012)
- June 29 – Ariadna Welter, Mexican actress (died 1998)
- July 5 – Tommy Cook, American producer, screenwriter and actor
- July 6 - Phil Roth, American actor (died 2002)
- July 8 – Jerry Vale, American actor and singer (died 2014)
- July 10
  - Bruce Boa, Canadian actor (died 2004)
  - Susan Cummings, German actress (died 2016)
- July 12 – Gordon Pinsent, Canadian actor, writer, director and singer (died 2023)
- July 13 – Darrell Sandeen, American character actor (died 2009)
- July 18 – Burt Kwouk, British-Chinese actor (died 2016)
- July 19 – Rhoda Williams, American actress (died 2006)
- July 20 – Sally Ann Howes, English actress and singer (died 2021)
- July 21 – Lukas Heller, German-born screenwriter (died 1988)
- July 24 – Jacqueline Brookes, American actress (died 2013)
- July 25 – Annie Ross, British-American singer and actress (died 2020)
- July 28 – Alfie Curtis, British actor (died 2017)
- July 30 – Tony Lip, American actor (died 2013)
- August 1
  - Bill Allison, American actor (died 2016)
  - Julie Bovasso, American actress (died 1991)
  - Geoffrey Holder, Trinidadian-American actor and musician (died 2014)
- August 5 – Joan Weldon, American actress, singer (died 2021)
- August 8 - Nita Talbot, American actress
- August 11 – Paul Soles, Canadian actor (died 2021)
- August 12 – Peter Weck, Austrian film director and actor
- August 14 – Liz Fraser, English actress (died 2018)
- August 17 – Harve Bennett, American producer and screenwriter (died 2015)
- August 23 - Vera Miles, retired American actress
- August 25 – Sir Sean Connery, Scottish actor (died 2020)
- August 28 – Ben Gazzara, American and director (died 2012)
- August 31 – Charles Kay, English actor (died 2025)
- September 16 – Anne Francis, American actress (died 2011)
- September 17 – David Huddleston, American actor (died 2016)
- September 21 – Dawn Addams, English actress (died 1985)
- September 24 – Horst Sachtleben, German actor (died 2022)
- September 26 – Philip Bosco, American actor (died 2018)
- October 1 – Richard Harris, Irish actor (died 2002)
- October 5
  - Skip Homeier, American actor (died 2017)
  - Yuriy Yakovlev, Bulgarian actor (died 2002)
- October 6 – Lou Cutell, American actor (died 2021)
- October 8 – James Olson, American actor (died 2022)
- October 10
  - Joan O'Hara, Irish actress (died 2007)
  - Harold Pinter, British screenwriter, director and actor (died 2008)
- October 13 – Paul Kent, American actor (died 2011)
- October 23 – Gérard Blain, French actor and director (died 2000)
- October 24 – Jack Angel, American voice actor and former radio personality (died 2021)
- November 3 – Lois Smith, American character actress
- November 5
  - Richard Davalos, American actor (died 2016)
  - Joaquín Martínez, Mexican-born American actor (died 2012)
- November 15 – Whitman Mayo, American actor (died 2001)
- November 20 – Bernard Horsfall, English actor (died 2013)
- November 23 – Robert Easton, American actor (died 2011)
- November 27 – Reinhard Glemnitz, German actor
- December 3 – Jean-Luc Godard, French director (died 2022)
- December 8 - Maximilian Schell, Swiss actor (died 2014)
- December 9
  - Buck Henry, American actor, screenwriter and director (died 2020)
  - Francesco Maselli, Italian director (died 2023)
- December 11 – Jean-Louis Trintignant, French actor (died 2022)
- December 13 – Robert Prosky, American actor (died 2008)
- December 17 – Armin Mueller-Stahl, German actor
- December 20 – Noel Ferrier, Australian actor, television personality and producer (died 1997)
- December 26 - Donald Moffat, British-American actor (died 2018)

== Deaths ==
- January 31 – Dorothy Seastrom, American actress (born 1903)
- February 23 – Mabel Normand, American actress (born 1893)
- July 7 – Arthur Conan Doyle, British author and creator of Sherlock Holmes (born 1859)
- August 26 – Lon Chaney, American actor (born 1883)
- September 14 – Tommy Mintz, American actor, assistant director (born 1906)
- September 15 – Milton Sills, American actor (born 1882)
- November 8 – Clare Eames, American actress (born 1894)
- December 15 – Diane Ellis, American actress (born 1909)

== Film debuts ==
- Robert Adair – Journey's End
- Rudolph Anders – Ludwig II, King of Bavaria
- Felix Aylmer – Escape!
- George Barbier – The Big Pond
- Vince Barnett – Wide Open
- Willie Best – Ladies of Leisure
- Joan Blondell – The Office Wife
- Humphrey Bogart – Up the River
- Sheila Bromley – Call of the Desert
- Bob Burns – Up the River
- James Cagney – Sinners' Holiday
- John Carradine – Bright Lights
- Edward Chapman – Juno and the Paycock
- Elisha Cook Jr. – Her Unborn Child
- Richard Cooper – The House of the Arrow
- Buster Crabbe – Good News
- Bing Crosby – King of Jazz
- George Curzon – Escape
- Katherine DeMille – Madame Satan
- Jan Duggan – Dixiana
- Irene Dunne – Leathernecking
- Jimmy Durante – Roadhouse Nights
- Annalisa Ericson – Frida's Songs
- Jimmy Godden – Big Business
- Sally Gray – The School for Scandal
- Ruth Hall – Hell Harbor
- John Hamilton – Dangerous Nan McGrew
- Rex Harrison – The Great Game
- Morris Harvey – The Man from Chicago
- Jack Hawkins – Birds of Prey
- Charlotte Henry – Harmony at Home
- Rose Hobart – Liliom
- Miriam Hopkins – Fast and Loose
- Shemp Howard – Soup to Nuts
- Victor Jory – Renegades
- Evalyn Knapp – Sinners' Holiday
- Hedy Lamarr – Money on the Street
- Charles Lane – City Girl
- John Larkin – Man to Man
- Frederick Lloyd – The W Plan
- Celia Lovsky – Twice Married
- Noel Madison – Sinners' Holiday
- Frank McHugh – The Dawn Patrol
- George Merritt – The W Plan
- Alan Napier – Caste
- Jay Novello – The Jade Box
- Laurence Olivier – The Temporary Widow
- Maire O'Neill – Juno and the Paycock
- Maureen O'Sullivan – So This Is London
- Cecilia Parker – King of Jazz
- Esmé Percy – Murder!
- Dorothy Peterson – Mothers Cry
- Irving Pichel – The Right to Love
- Ginger Rogers – Young Man of Manhattan
- Magda Schneider – Boycott
- Harry Shannon – Heads Up
- Sebastian Shaw – Caste
- Penny Singleton – Good News
- Spencer Tracy – Up the River
- Austin Trevor – At the Villa Rose
- Barbara Weeks – Whoopee!
- Ben Welden – The Man from Chicago
- Hugh Williams – Charley's Aunt
