= Neil Brand =

British actor, composer and playwright

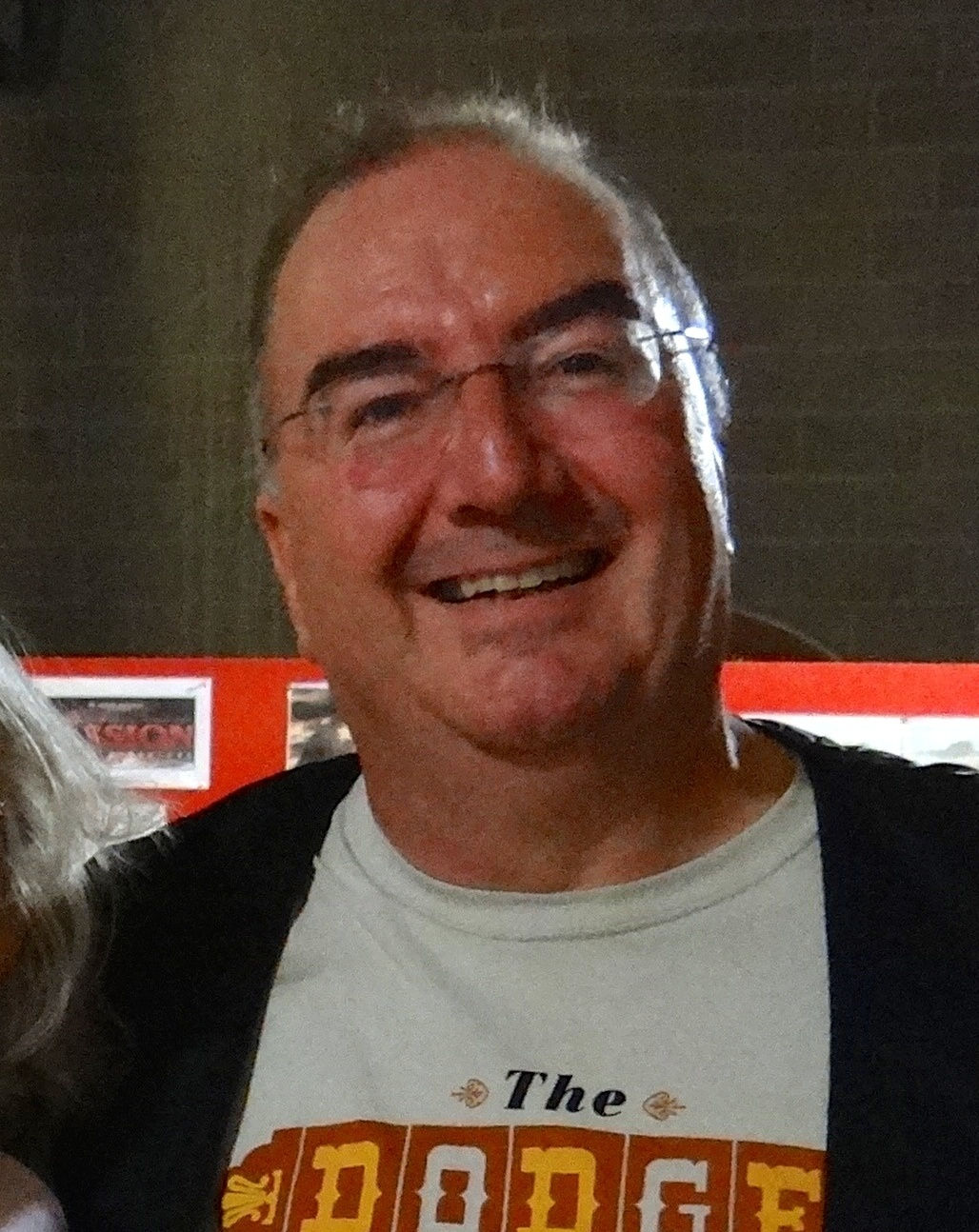
- Neil Brand in 2014
- Born: 18 March 1958 (age 68); Burgess Hill, Sussex, England
- Occupations: Actor, dramatist, composer, author
- Website: https://www.neilbrand.com

Neil Brand (born 18 March 1958) is an English dramatist, composer and author. In addition to being a regular silent film accompanist at London's National Film Theatre, Brand has composed new scores for two restored films from the 1920s, The Wrecker and Anthony Asquith's Underground.

Neil Brand has been a silent film accompanist for nearly 40 years, regularly in London at the Barbican and BFI National Film Theatres, throughout the UK and Ireland and at film festivals around the world, including Australia, New Zealand, America, Canada, Israel, Scandinavia, Georgia, Ukraine, throughout Europe. Brand has also acted and written plays for the BBC. His book, Dramatic Notes, focuses on the art of composing narrative music for the cinema, theatre, radio and television. For his contribution to music, in 2016, Brand was awarded with a BASCA Gold Badge Award.

== Background and education ==
Brand was born in Burgess Hill, Sussex, England, and attended Junction Road Primary School in Burgess Hill, then Brighton, Hove and Sussex Grammar School (now Brighton Hove & Sussex Sixth Form College).

At the age of 18, he went to the University College of Wales, Aberystwyth, to study Drama under John Edmunds. However, he had a talent for music, and it was at Aberystwyth that he began writing and playing music seriously for the first time. In 2013 he was made a Fellow of Aberystwyth University.

== Television and radio ==
On television, Brand has appeared in Switch, a BBC drama for the hearing impaired, as Ted, a bullying businessman. In 2004 he appeared as an expert on cinema accompaniment in Who Do You Think You Are? which investigated the musical background of soprano Lesley Garrett.

Other work for the BBC has included musical compositions and radio plays. He also composed the score for Channel Four's three-part documentary series on the Crimean War in 1997. One of his plays, Stan, was broadcast on radio in 2004 on BBC Radio 4 and then adapted as a television play, first broadcast on BBC Four. It documents Stan Laurel's last moments with best friend and comedy partner Oliver Hardy, who lies bedridden after a stroke. Another play broadcast on Radio 4 in 2007, Seeing It Through, dealt with Charles Masterman and his efforts to coordinate writers and journalists for the British propaganda effort in World War I.

In September 2013, Neil Brand presented the BBC Four programme Sound of Cinema: The Music that Made the Movies. In the first episode in the series, he looked at the impact of classic orchestral film scores via the work of European-born composers (such as Max Steiner and Erich Wolfgang Korngold) and their influence on contemporary film composers such as Bernard Herrmann, Hans Zimmer and John Williams. He was also a guest presenter in the BBC Radio 3 programme Sound of Cinema: Live from the BFI presented by Sean Rafferty where he demonstrated on piano some of the intricate motifs from Franz Waxman as well as some of his own music.

On 20 December 2014, BBC Radio 4 broadcast Brand's new version of A Christmas Carol, adapted by him for actors, the BBC Singers and the BBC Symphony Orchestra, which was recorded before an audience in the BBC Maida Vale Studios. Other Christmas broadcasts included the ghost stories of M.R. James (BBC Woman's Hour Drama, 2018) and an original radio play, The Haunting of M.R. James.

In January and February 2015, Brand presented the BBC Four programme Sound of Song in which he looked at the history of popular song and its relationship to technology in the twentieth century. In January 2017, also on BBC Four, he presented Sound of Musicals, exploring how musical theatre has evolved over 100 years. a further series Sound of Movie Musicals, was broadcast in 2018. One critic said: "Brand was an enthusiastic compère throughout, combining formidable knowledge and terrific piano playing on his Steinway". His 2020 series The Sound of TV was called "refreshing" and "insightful" by the i.

== Music for films ==
Brand wrote a new score for the restored 1929 film The Wrecker, released on DVD in November 2009. He followed this up in 2011 with a score for another recently restored film, Anthony Asquith's 1928 drama Underground: the new composition was premiered by the BBC Symphony Orchestra at the Barbican Centre in London.

Brand regularly accompanies silent films with the skiffle band The Dodge Brothers (which includes Mark Kermode on double bass). They have played to White Oak, Beggars of Life, The Ghost That Never Returns, Hell's Hinges and City Girl.

Brand also composed a score for The Lodger. This is the score that is available on the Criterion Collection's release of the DVD. According to Brand, he looked to film noir motifs from composers such as Miklos Rosza when making this score.

He has also written a book, Dramatic Notes (1998), discussing the art of composing narrative music for the cinema, theatre, radio or television, and including interviews with composers and directors.

He has an occasional slot on BBC Radio 4's The Film Programme, analysing and deconstructing film music of various genres, illustrating his points with excerpts on the piano.
