= Underground (1928 film) =

1928 film

- Directed by: Anthony Asquith
- Written by: Anthony Asquith
- Produced by: Harry Bruce Woolfe
- Starring: Brian Aherne; Elissa Landi; Cyril McLaglen; Norah Baring
- Cinematography: Stanley Rodwell
- Production company: British Instructional Films
- Distributed by: Pro Patria Films
- Release date: 1928
- Running time: 92 minutes
- Country: United Kingdom
- Languages: Sound (Synchronized); English Intertitles

Underground is a 1928 British sound drama film directed by Anthony Asquith and starring Brian Aherne, Elissa Landi, Cyril McLaglen, and Norah Baring. While the film has no audible dialogue, it was released with a synchronized musical score with sound effects, using both the sound-on-disc and sound-on-film process. The film examines the lives of ordinary Londoners and the romance between them, set on and around the London Underground.

The film starts and ends with an Underground train coming into a station. It shows humorous scenes of people coping with the crowds on the underground train. It also has interesting shoots of London, from a bus, of the Thames from the top of a power station which appears to be Lots Road Power Station, a pub, and a shop. The film has strong roles for the two leading women, while the men are more clichéd, one a villain and the other a blue-eyed, blond angel.

== Plot ==
Underground (1928)

An electrician and a porter both fall in love with a shop girl they meet on the London Underground. Their rivalry begins with humour and ends very darkly at the Power Station.

== Cast ==
- Brian Aherne as Bill
- Elissa Landi as Nell
- Cyril McLaglen as Bert, Power station worker
- Norah Baring as Kate, Seamstress

== Music ==
The film featured a theme song entitled "Arms Of Love", composed by Alfred Bryan and Francis Wheeler (words) and Pete Wendling (music).

== Production ==
Underground was made by British Instructional Films at Elstree and Cricklewood Studios and on location in London including scenes shot at Lots Road Power Station in Chelsea. The film was based on an original scenario written by Asquith.

== Restoration ==
The picture portion of Underground was restored in 2009 under the auspices of the British Film Institute (BFI). For unknown reasons, the original synchronized musical score has not been restored to the film. In 2011, composer and well-known silent film accompanist Neil Brand wrote a completely modern score for the film, which was then premiered by the BBC Symphony Orchestra at the Barbican Centre in London.

== Bibliography ==
- Ryall, Tom. Anthony Asquith. Manchester University Press, 2005.
