= List of French films of 1930 =

French films released in 1930

A list of films produced in France in 1930:

== A-L ==
Title	Director	Cast	Genre	Notes
À mi-chemin du ciel	Alberto Cavalcanti	Marguerite Moreno, Jean Mercanton	Drama	
Accused, Stand Up!	Maurice Tourneur	Charles Vanel, Gaby Morlay, André Roanne	Mystery	
Adieu, Les Copains!	Leo Joannon	Joe Hamman, Leo Joannon		
Africa Speaks!	Walter Futter	Paul Hoefler, Lowell Thomas	Adventure documentary	Co-production with US
Amours Viennoises		Lyne Clevers, Maurice de Canonge	Comedy drama	
Atlantis	Jean Kemm	Alice Field, Maxime des Jardins, Constant Rémy	Drama	Filmed in Britain
Barcarolle d'amour	Henry Roussell	Simone Cerdan, Charles Boyer, Jim Gérald	Comedy-drama	
The Blood of a Poet	Jean Cocteau	Lee Miller, Pauline Carton, Féral Benga	Surrealist film	
Cain: Aventures des mers exotiques	Léon Poirier	Thomy Bourdelle	Adventure	
Cendrillon de Paris	Jean Hémard	Colette Darfeuil, Alice Tissot, André Roanne	Comedy	
Chérie	Louis Mercanton	Mona Goya, Saint-Granier, Marguerite Moreno	Musical comedy	Co-production with US
Counter Investigation	Jean Daumery	Suzy Vernon, Jeanne Helbling, Daniel Mendaille	Crime	Filmed in United States
Dans Une Ile Perdue	Alberto Cavalcanti	Danièle Parola, Marguerite Moreno		
Deux Fois Vingt Ans	Charles-Félix Tavano	Paul Ollivier, Annabella	Comedy-drama	
Everybody Wins	Hans Steinhoff	Jean Gabin, Renée Héribel, Gaby Basset	Comedy	
A Hole in the Wall	René Barberis	Marguerite Moreno, Pierre Brasseur	Comedy	
Illusions	Lucien Mayrargue	Pierre Batcheff, Mary Serta	Comedy	
Instinct	André Liabel	Léon Mathot, Madeleine Carroll	Drama	
Jimmy	Jean Benoît-Lévy, Marie Epstein			
Jour de noces	Maurice Gleize			
The King of Paris	Leo Mittler	Iván Petrovich, Marie Glory	Comedy	Co-production with Germany
L'Âge d'Or	Luis Buñuel	Gaston Modot, Lya Lys	Surrealist	
L' anglais tel qu' on le parle		Vera Engels, Félicien Tramel	Comedy	
L'Arlesienne	Jacques de Baroncelli	Blanche Montel, Germaine Dermoz		
L'aviateur	William A. Seiter, Jean Daumery	Jeanne Helbling, Douglas Fairbanks		French/US co-production
L'Enfant de l'amour	Marcel L'Herbier	Jaque Catelain, Michel Simon	Comedy drama	
L’étrange fiancée	Georges Pallu	Lilian Constantini, Henri Baudin		
L’étrangère	Konstantin Eggert		Drama	
L'homme qui assassina	Kurt Bernhardt, Jean Tarride	Jean Angelo, Marie Bell		
L'Opéra de Quat'sous	Georg Wilhelm Pabst	Margo Lion, Albert Préjean	Musical comedy	
La Bodega	Benito Perojo	Conchita Piquer, Gabriel Gabrio		
La chanson des nations	Rudolf Meinert, Maurice Gleize	André Roanne, Dolly Davis	Drama	
La douceur d'aimer	René Hervil	Victor Boucher, Renee Devillers		
La Femme d'une Nuit	Marcel L'Herbier	Francesca Bertini, Marion Gerth		
La Femme et le Rossignol	André Hugon	Jean Marconi, Marcelle Praince		
La folle aventure	Carl Froelich, André-Paul Antoine	Marie Bell, Jean Murat		
La lettre	Louis Mercanton	Marcelle Romee, Huang Thi The		
La Maison de la Fléche	Henri Fescourt	Annabella, Alice Field	Mystery	
La maison jaune de Rio	Karl Grune, Robert Péguy	Renée Héribel, Hélène Robert		
La nuit est a nous	Henry Roussell, Carl Froelich	Vony Myriame, Jean Murat		
La piste des géants	Pierre Couderc			
La Prison en folie	Henry Wulschleger	Helene Hallier, Noël-Noël		
La Reve	Jacques de Baroncelli			
La ronde des heures	Alexandre Ryder	André Baugé, Paule Andral		
La Servante	Jean Choux	Therese Reignier, Robert Hommet		
La Tendresse	André Hugon	Marcelle Chantal, Jean Toulout		
La vie miraculeuse de Thérèse Martin	Julien Duvivier	Simone Bourday, Andre Marnay	Drama	
Le Blanc et le noir	Robert Florey, Marc Allégret	Raimu, Suzanne Dantes	Comedy	
Le chanteur de Séville	Yvan Noé, Ramon Novarro	Ramon Novarro, Suzy Vernon		
Le chemin du paradis	Wilhelm Thiele, Max de Vaucorbeil	Lilian Harvey, Henri Garat	Musical	
Le Défenseur	Alexandre Ryder	Louise Lagrange, Max Maxudian		
Le Poignard Malais	Roger Goupillières	Gaby Basset, Charlotte Barbier-Krauss		
Le procès de Mary Dugan	Marcel De Sano	Huguette Duflos, Charles Boyer	Drama	
Le Refuge	Léon Mathot	Andre Burgere, Alice Field		
Le roi des aulnes	Marie-Louise Iribe	Mary Costes, Rosa Bertens		
Le Spectre vert	Jacques Feyder, Lionel Barrymore	André Luguet, Jetta Goudal	Drama	French/US co-production
Le Tampon du capiston	Joe Francis, Jean Toulout	Helene Hallier, Henry Laverne	Comedy	
Les Deux Mondes	Ewald André Dupont	Marie Glory, Max Maxudian		
Les Vacances du diable	Alberto Cavalcanti	Marcelle Chantal, Jeanne Fusier-Gir		
Levy and Company	André Hugon	Leon Belieres, Marie Glory	Comedy	
Little Lise	Jean Grémillon	Pierre Alcover, Joe Alex	Drama	
Lopez, le bandit	Jean Daumery	Jeanne Helbling, Suzy Vernon		
Love Songs	Robert Florey	Yolande Laffon, Pierre Bertin	Comedy	

== M-Z ==
Title	Director	Cast	Genre	Notes
Maison de Danses	Maurice Tourneur	Gaby Morlay, Charles Vanel		
Méphisto	Henri Debain	Janine Ronceray, Jean Gabin	Drama	
Miss Europe	Augusto Genina	Louise Brooks, Georges Charlia, Gaston Jacquet	Romantic drama	
Mon cœur incognito	Manfred Noa, André-Paul Antoine	Mady Christians, Marthe Sarbel		
Monsieur le Duc	Jean de Limur	Alice Field, Guy Favieres		
Monsieur le Maréchal	Carl Lamac	Hélène Robert, Edith Mera		
My Childish Father	Jean de Limur	Adolphe Menjou, Roger Tréville, Alice Cocéa	Drama	
The Mystery of the Villa Rose	René Hervil, Louis Mercanton	Léon Mathot, Simone Vaudry	Mystery	
The Mystery of the Yellow Room	Marcel L'Herbier	Roland Toutain, Huguette Duflos, Léon Belières	Mystery	
Nights of Princes	Marcel L'Herbier	Gina Manès, Jaque Catelain, Harry Nestor	Drama	
Our Masters, the Servants	Hewitt Grantham-Hayes	Henri Garat, René Ferté	Comedy	
Paramount en parade	Charles de Rochefort			French-language version of Paramount on Parade
Paris by Night	Henri Diamant-Berger	Armand Bernard, Marguerite Moreno, Suzet Maïs	Comedy	
The Prosecutor Hallers	Robert Wiene	Jean-Max, Colette Darfeuil	Drama	French version of the German film The Other
The Road Is Fine	Robert Florey	André Baugé, Léon Bary	Musical	
Le Roi des resquilleurs	Pierre Colombier	Hélène Perdrière, Pierre Nay	Comedy	
Romance À l'Inconnue	René Barberis	Annabella, Charles Lamy		
The Shark	Henri Chomette	Albert Préjean, Gina Manès	Drama	
Sirocco	Jacques Séverac	Leila Atouna, Pierre Geay		
The Sweetness of Loving	René Hervil	Victor Boucher, Renée Devillers, Henri Bosc	Comedy	
Tarakanova	Raymond Bernard	Edith Jehanne, Paule Andral	Historical	
Tenderness	André Hugon	Marcelle Chantal, Jean Toulout, André Dubosc	Drama	
Toute sa Vie	Alberto Cavalcanti	Marcelle Chantal, Elmire Vautier		
Tu m'oublieras	Henri Diamant-Berger	Damia, Jean d'yd	Comedy	
Un caprice de la Pompadour	Willi Wolff, Joe Hamman	Fernand Baer, André Baugé		
Under the Roofs of Paris	René Clair	Albert Préjean, Pola Illéry	Romantic drama	
Une belle garce	Marco de Gastyne	Gina Manès, Simone Genevois		
Une femme a menti	Charles de Rochefort	Louise Lagrange, Jeanne Helbling		

== See also ==
- 1930 in France
