= Mr. Wu (1919 film) =

1919 film by Maurice Elvey

Mr. Wu is a 1919 British drama film directed by Maurice Elvey and starring Matheson Lang, Roy Royston, Lillah McCarthy and Meggie Albanesi. It was based on a 1913 play Mr. Wu by Maurice Vernon and Harold Owen. During the filming Albanesi became infatuated with Lang. The picture was made by Stoll Pictures, and was one of their first major successes. Lon Chaney played the title role in a 1927 remake. The screenplay concerns a Chinese Mandarin who murders his daughter.

== Plot summary ==
A Chinese Mandarin murders his daughter after she falls in love with an Englishman.

== Cast ==
- Matheson Lang - Mr Wu
- Lillah McCarthy - Mrs Gregory
- Meggie Albanesi - Nang Ping
- Roy Royston - Basil Gregory
- Teddy Arundell - Mr Gregory

== Bibliography ==
- Sweet, Matthew. Shepperton Babylon: The Lost Worlds of British Cinema. Faber and Faber, 2005.
