= 7/2 =

7/2 may refer to:

- July 2 (month-day date notation)
- February 7 (day-month date notation)
- A form of septuple meter
- A type of heptagram
