= The Dodge Brothers =

British skiffle band from Southampton

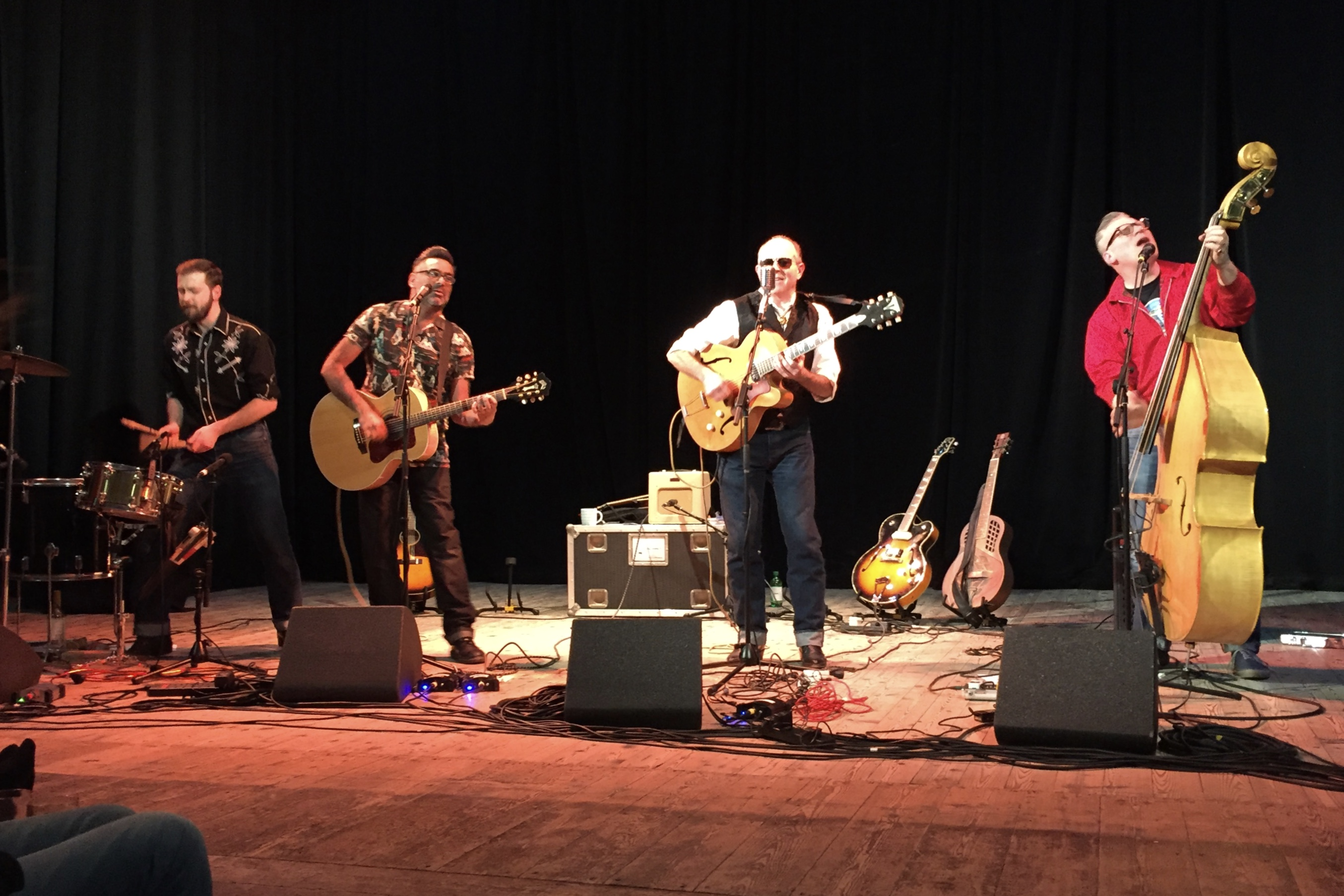
- The Dodge Brothers at the Shelley Theatre, Bournemouth, February 2016

Background information
- Origin: Southampton, England
- Genres: Skiffle, Americana, rockabilly, bluegrass, folk, country, blues
- Years active: 2006-present
- Labels: Weeping Angel Records
- Members: Mark Kermode; Mike Hammond; Aly Hirji; Alex Hammond
- Website: www.dodgebrothers.co.uk

The Dodge Brothers are a British skiffle band from Southampton playing Americana, rockabilly, bluegrass, folk, country and blues music. The band includes film critic and BBC television presenter Mark Kermode, along with Mike and Alex Hammond and Aly Hirji.

== Formation and early releases ==
According to guitarist Mike Hammond, The Dodge Brothers started in 1996 when Hammond and Kermode were introduced by their wives. "By the end of the night, we were drinking whisky and playing piano," Hammond recalls, at which time Kermode suggested they form a band. They then played local gigs with a third member Pete Stanfield on harmonica, and then as a two-piece before soundman Aly Hirji joined on rhythm guitar after meeting Hammond and Kermode at a pub where the duo were playing in 2005. Kermode explains:

Mike and I played as a two-piece for a while with me playing bass and harmonica, and then Aly and I met. I told him to come down to a gig and check it out because he’s a sound engineer; he said 'Fine, but it sounds horrible – can I fiddle with the sound?' So, he fiddled with the sound, and then the PA, and then the guitar...

Kermode has described the band as "guitars, banjo, slap bass, harmonica – and no drums, which is essentially a hillbilly/skiffle set-up. The music we play definitely leans toward rockabilly, but the choice of material is somewhat older, our set includes Washboard Sam's "Who Pumped the Wind in My Doughnut", which remains one of the greatest and rudest songs ever written. I think the best way of describing what we do is to say that we play songs about transport and homicide... with occasional episodes of drunkenness".

On writing 'old' songs Kermode says

We used to say that we write songs about transport and homicide and that was the original joke. When Mike and I started a band we were playing the old American songbook. At some point I thought we should play our own songs, but it didn't fit with the old material. We used to say we wouldn’t play anything recorded after 1956. So I wondered if I could write something that sounds old, so I wrote a song and then next time I saw Mike I sung it to him. Very simple, straightforward twelve bar blues. I told him it was called ‘Church House Blues’ and he went away and looked it up on the internet and he couldn't find it anywhere. He called me up and said “I can’t find this song online, did you write it?” and I said that I'd answer that question if he thought there was a possibility that I didn't. And I was trying to prove that if you think of all the elements you can write new old songs. We started with transport and homicide, alcohol, and heartbreak. We asked, “how would you write a song that starts with ‘I woke up this morning and…’?”.

== Television and radio appearances ==
The band played on the BBC Two programme The Culture Show (which was co-presented by Kermode) in a piece about skiffle with Billy Bragg on 19 May 2007 and took part in the same show's 'Busking Challenge' on 29 March 2008.

The band have appeared on Kermode's video blog 'Kermode Uncut', playing 'skiffle' covers of blockbuster movie soundtracks including Star Wars, Star Trek, The A-Team and Smurfs 3D. The music heard on the 'Kermode Uncut' blog is extracts from The Dodge Brothers' music.

The band provided skiffle movie theme tunes for one round of a quiz show on Simon Mayo and Kermode's BBC Radio 5 Live Christmas show in 2010.

== Silent cinema ==
With silent movie pianist Neil Brand, the Dodge Brothers have played live accompaniments to silent movies at music and film festivals around the globe, including Midnight Sun Film Festival in Lapland, Tromsø International Film Festival in Norway as well as BFI, National Science and Media Museum and many others in UK. These films started with White Oak (1921) at The Barbican Centre, followed by Beggars of Life (1928), The Ghost That Never Returns (1929), Hells Hinges (1916) and City Girl (1930). In 2014, The Dodge Brothers were the first band to play to a silent film at Glastonbury Festival.

== Albums ==
=== The Dodge Brothers ===
In 2006 they recorded their first album, a self-titled record of covers from "the songbook of weird old America". Drummer Alex Hammond appears on two tracks before joining the band just before their first TV appearance in 2007.

=== Louisa & The Devil ===
In 2008 The Dodge Brothers released their second album Louisa and the Devil, the first with the present line-up and featuring mostly original material "written to sound old". The track "Died and Gone to Hell" also features Billy Lunn of The Subways on vocals and guitar.

=== The Sun Set ===
The band's third album, The Sun Set, was recorded at the Sun Studios in Memphis. A BBC Radio 2 hour long documentary was broadcast on 16 August 2012 (the anniversary of Elvis' death) which followed the band on their journey to Memphis.

Kermode also writes about the experience of recording at Sun Studios is his book How Does It Feel: A Life of Musical Misadventure released in 2018.

=== Drive Train ===
Drive Train, the fourth album by The Dodge Brothers was released in 2018. Henry Priestman played organ, accordion, kettledrums, melodica and penny whistle on the last track on the album, "When I'm Gone". Neil Brand played piano on silent film (Hell's Hinges) inspired track "Blaze".

=== Singles ===
In 2023 The Dodge Brothers release four new Christmas singles which include a cover of Jimmy Butler's 1959 song "Trim Your Tree".

In October 2024 the Dodge Brothers released a new single "Rock Island Line" (the version they recorded in 2015 with Steve Levine). This song is featured in the movie Midas Man, a British biographical film about the life of music entrepreneur Brian Epstein. The Dodge Brothers are shown as the band that Epstein first 'saw' in The Cavern in 1961, to illustrate how the early American skiffle sound inspired the young Beatles.

== Liverpool International Music Festival ==
The Dodge Brothers recorded four songs exclusively for Liverpool International Music Festival. This was part of the 'Music Migrations'- themed Commissions show, retracing key influential records coming to Liverpool from the U.S. after World War II, inspiring pioneering movements from Merseybeat to doo wop to rock and roll. Musically directed by Steve Levine and presented by BBC Radio 2’s Janice Long, the event welcomed a plethora of established, as well as emerging artists, who encapsulated these influences and who shared their own sounds. The Dodge Brothers showed the early influences of The Quarrymen, who later became The Beatles, by recording three songs as they would have been recorded in 1953 (live, in one take with no overdubs and no headphones) at Steve Levine's recording studio in Liverpool.

== Discography ==
=== Albums ===
- The Dodge Brothers (2006)
- Louisa & the Devil (2009 Weeping Angel Records)
- The Sun Set: Recorded at Sun Studio, Memphis, Tennessee (2013 Weeping Angel Records)
- Drive Train (2018 Weeping Angel Records)

=== Singles ===
- "I Can't Wait For Christmas" (2023 Weeping Angel Records)
- "Christmas in Heaven" (2023 Weeping Angel Records)
- "It's Christmas! Don't Shoot Santa" (2023 Weeping Angel Records)
- "Trim Your (Christmas) Tree" (2023 Weeping Angel Records)
- "Rock Island Line" (as featured in the film, Midas Man) (2024 Weeping Angel Records)
