= Theo Barker =

British social and economic historian

Theodore Cardwell Barker (19 July 1923 – 22 November 2001), usually known as Theo Barker, was a British social and economic historian.

== Life ==
Barker was born in St Helens, Lancashire, England on 19 July 1923. After schooling in the area, he studied at the University of Oxford, obtaining a first-class degree in Modern History from Jesus College, Oxford in 1948. He obtained a doctorate from the University of Manchester in 1951, on the 19th century history of St Helens. This led to his first book, co-written with a school contemporary, John Harris, who had been researching St Helens in the 18th century. A Merseyside Town in the Industrial Revolution (1954) was influential in the emerging field of urban history. After teaching at the University of Aberdeen for 1 year, Barker taught at the London School of Economics between 1953 and 1964, when he became Professor of Economic and Social History at the newly established University of Kent. In 1976, he returned to the LSE and retired in 1983. He died on 22 November 2001.

== Works ==
His work on the history of St Helens led to his researching the history of Pilkington Glass, which was based in the town. He published Pilkington Brothers And The Glass Industry in 1960. He was also interested in transport history, co-authoring A History Of London Transport: The 19th Century (1963), and contributing extensively to the 1974 volume about the 20th century. This interest led to him becoming chairman of the Transport History Research Trust. Other writings on related topics included The Transport Contractors Of Rye (1982) and The Rise And Rise of Road Transport, 1600–1990 (1993). He wrote histories of the Worshipful Company of Carpenters and Worshipful Company of Pewterers in 1968 and 1974 respectively. He served as president of the Railway and Canal Historical Society, as founding chairman of the Oral History Society and as secretary and then chairman of the British National Committee of Historians. He was not, however (despite his wishes), elected as a Fellow of the British Academy.

== Personal life ==
Barker was married to the operatic singer Judith Pierce.
