= Little Stranger (film) =

- Directed by: George King
- Written by: George King
- Produced by: George King
- Starring: Nigel Playfair; Eva Moore; Norah Baring
- Cinematography: Günther Krampf
- Edited by: Al Barnes
- Production company: George King Productions
- Distributed by: Metro-Goldwyn-Mayer
- Release date: 1934
- Running time: 51 minutes
- Country: United Kingdom
- Language: English

Little Stranger is a 1934 British drama film directed by George King and starring Nigel Playfair, Eva Moore and Norah Baring. It was made as a quota quickie.

== Cast ==
- Nigel Playfair as Sam Collins
- Eva Moore as Jessie Collins
- Norah Baring as Millie Dent
- Hamilton Keene as Tom Hale
- Charles Hawtrey

== Bibliography ==
- Chibnall, Steve. Quota Quickies: The Birth of the British 'B' Film. British Film Institute, 2007.
- Low, Rachael. Filmmaking in 1930s Britain. George Allen & Unwin, 1985.
- Wood, Linda. British Films, 1927-1939. British Film Institute, 1986.
