= Norah Baring =

English actress (1905–1985)

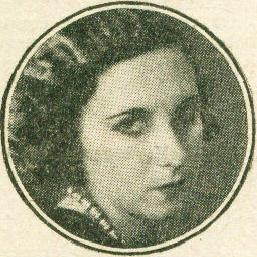
- Norah Baring, 1938
- Born: 26 November 1905; London, England
- Died: 8 February 1985 (aged 79); Surrey, England
- Occupation: Actress
- Years active: 1928–1934

Norah Baring (born Nora Minnie Baker; 26 November 1905 – 8 February 1985), was an English stage and film actress best known on screen for portraying Diana Baring in the Alfred Hitchcock thriller Murder! (1930).

== Early life ==
Norah Minnie Baker was born in Acton, London, on the 26 November 1905, to mother Annie Maud and father Forester Cyril Baker. Her father worked in textiles.

The family lived on Valetta Road, Ealing. She was baptised at Saint Saviour, Shepherd's Bush, on 24 December 1905.

By 1911 the family were living in Mottingham, Kent. They then moved to Devon, and by 1921 had settled in Newton Abbot. She went to school in Plymouth and then studied art at the Newton Abbot Art School prior to becoming an actress.

She told the film magazine Film Weekly: "Having realised early, clearly and painfully, that a childish talent for drawing and painting, though encouraged by kind friends and relations, did not constitute a vocation, I tried the stage."

== Career ==
Professionally, she used the name Norah Baring. She studied under actress Rosina Phillippi and her first significant appearance on stage came in James Barrie's play A Kiss For Cinderella, in a part specially written for her. She was unsuccessful in finding parts in British films and sought a career in Germany. Baring made her debut in the 1928 German-Swedish silent film The Doctors' Women, also known as Parisiskor.

While working in Germany, she was spotted by two Englishmen and was introduced to Anthony Asquith, who directed her in Underground (1928) and as the female lead in silent thriller A Cottage on Dartmoor (1929). In 1930, she portrayed Diana Baring in the Alfred Hitchcock thriller Murder!.

By 1934, her popularity had waned, and she retired from public life.

== Personal life and death ==
Baring married solicitor Ronald Montague Simon on 26 June 1928, in London, having met him near Nice, France, the previous year. They lived together in Kensington. The couple had a daughter, Elisabeth, on 3 January 1932. Baring then married Douglas Forbes in Kensington, in 1934. The couple had a son together. Baring's third marriage was to John Baerselman in 1946.

Baring died from pneumonia at Puttenham Hill House care home in Puttenham, Surrey, on 8 February 1985, aged 79.

== Filmography ==
- Underground (1928)
- Parisiennes (1928)
- The Celestial City (1929)
- The Runaway Princess (1929)
- A Cottage on Dartmoor (1929)
- Murder! (1930)
- Should a Doctor Tell? (1930)
- Two Worlds (1930)
- At the Villa Rose (1930)
- The Lyons Mail (1931)
- Strange Evidence (1933)
- The House of Trent (1933)
- Little Stranger (1934)
