= A Choral Fantasia (Holst) =

Choral composition by Gustav Holst

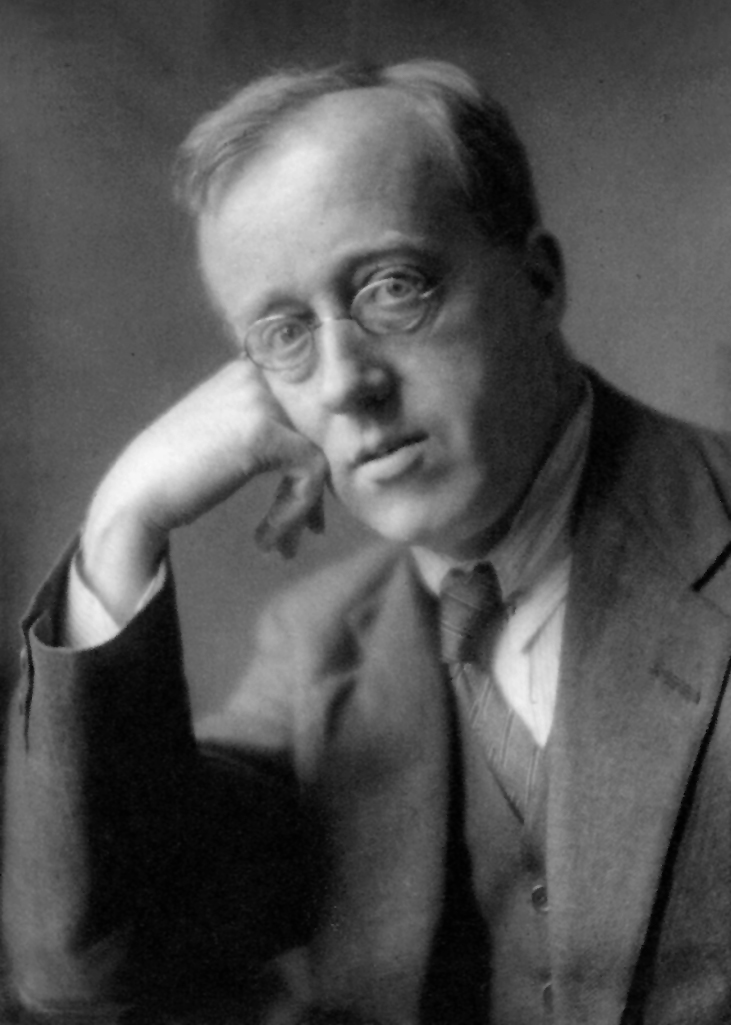
Gustav Holst ca. 1921

A Choral Fantasia, Op. 51, is a work Gustav Holst composed in 1930, setting a selection of verses from Robert Bridges' Ode to Music. Featuring a concertante organ part, A Choral Fantasia also involves a soprano soloist, chorus, string orchestra, brass and percussion.

== Background and composition ==
The work was written in 1930 for the Three Choirs Festival by request of organist Herbert Sumsion, who wanted a work involving a concertante organ part. Holst originally conceived the piece as an Organ Concerto but later changed the concept and incorporated the poem Ode to Music by his friend Robert Bridges, originally written for the Purcell bicentenary celebrations in 1895. Bridges' poem is a requiem of sorts for all past artists. The finished work is scored for the unusual forces of organ, brass, percussion and strings with chorus and solo soprano. The Choral Fantasia was first performed in 1931 at the Three Choirs festival in Gloucester Cathedral with Dorothy Silk (Holst's favorite soprano, who had premiered his Choral Symphony six years earlier) singing the solo part, and Holst conducting. The work was first performed in the United States on May 19, 1932, at Ann Arbor, Michigan's annual May Festival at Hill Auditorium; the composer conducted the Chicago Symphony Orchestra, the University of Michigan's University Choral Union, and soprano Helen Van Loon.

== The work ==
The Fantasia opens with a colossal fortissimo prelude for organ in the phrygian mode leading to a chord – causing one reviewer in The Observer to comment, in a spirit of an all too prevalent parochialism, that "when Holst begins his new Choral Fantasia on a six four of G and a C♯ below that, with an air of take it or leave it, one is inclined to leave it" – which introduces the soprano ("Man born of desire, cometh out of the night") over almost inaudible organ line. A chromatic fugato section bearing the otherworldly bleakness of Egdon Heath and Saturn follows before trumpets, trombones and timpani rise menacingly in 5/4 introducing an important, typically Holstian, ostinato figure. The chorus enters, hymnlike, in 7/4 with the words "Rejoice, ye dead where ere your spirits dwell" to diatonic brass accompaniment. This leads to a climax with a reprise of the opening organ prelude. The ensuing music, really a reprise of the fugato section, travels through some unexpected harmonic procedures and dissonances but a brief poignant section for strings leads to the return of the soprano ("Rejoice, ye dead") over the fading string accompaniment ending the work on a note of resignation.

== Notes and references ==
- Matthews, Colin. "Gustav Holst". The New Grove Encyclopedia of Music and Musicians.
- Holmes, Paul (1997). Holst. Omnibus Press. ISBN 0-7119-6525-0.
- Short, Michael (1990). Gustav Holst: The Man and his Music. Oxford University Press. ISBN 0-19-314154-X.
