= 1930 in the United Kingdom =

Events from the year 1930 in the United Kingdom.

== Incumbents ==
- Monarch – George V
- Prime Minister – Ramsay MacDonald (Labour)

== Events ==
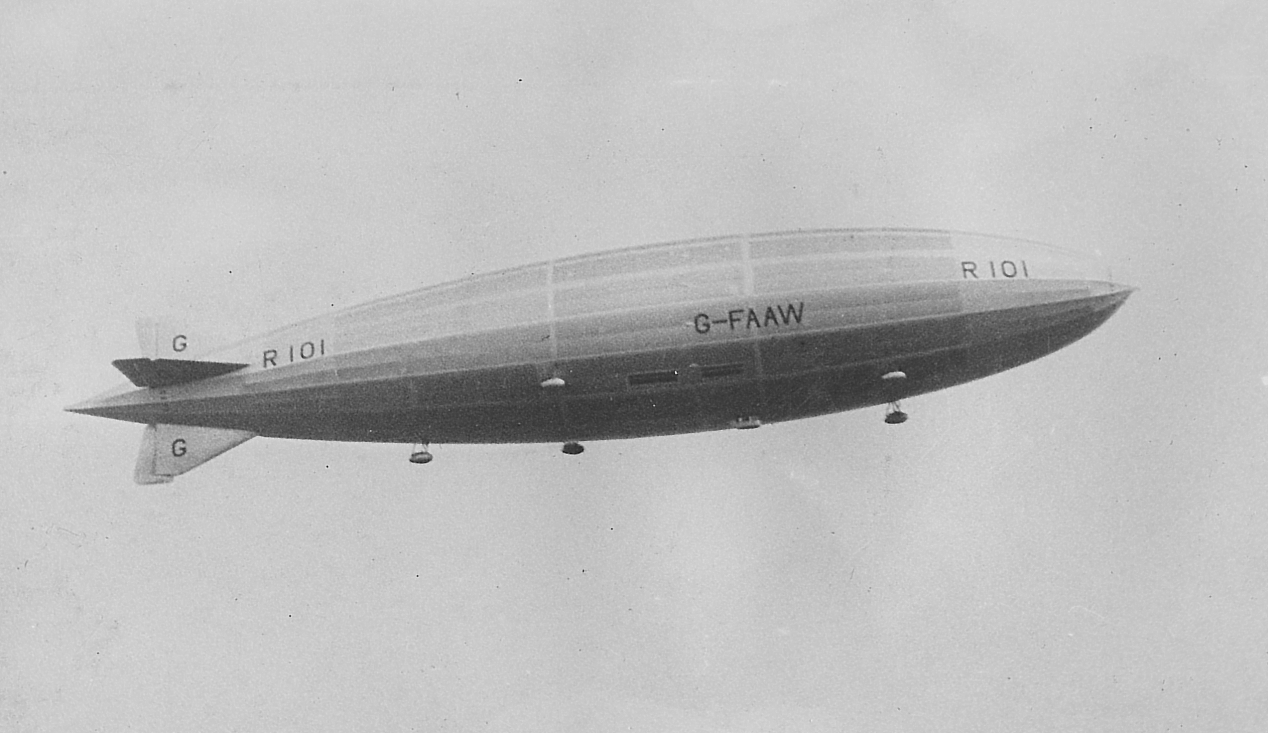
R101 in flight

- 1 January – the Central Committee of the Communist Party of Great Britain begins publishing a newspaper, the Daily Worker.
- 1 February – The Times publishes its first original crossword.
- March – fitness organisation the Women's League of Health and Beauty set up by Mary Bagot Stack; by 1939 it will have over 100,000 members.
- 9 March – the British Broadcasting Corporation opens its second high-power medium-wave transmitter at Brookmans Park, north of London, and with it launches its "Regional Scheme" which sees station 5XX renamed as the National Programme while 2LO becomes the London Regional Programme.
- 29 March – Shaun Goilin wins the Grand National, ridden by Tommy Cullinan.
- April – John Gielgud plays the title role of Hamlet for the first time, at The Old Vic in London.
- 1 April – Poor law unions and workhouses abolished under the Local Government Act 1929, responsibility for public assistance transferring to local authorities and workhouses becoming hospitals or public assistance institutions under their control.
- 18 April – BBC radio listeners uniquely hear the announcement "Good evening. Today is Good Friday. There is no news." Piano music follows.
- 22 April – the United Kingdom, Japan and the United States sign the London Naval Treaty regulating submarine warfare and limiting shipbuilding.
- 30 April – first section of the 132kV AC National Grid, the Central Scotland Electricity Scheme, is switched on in Edinburgh.
- 5 May – an explosion on the eleventh floor of Bibby's oil cake mill in Liverpool leaves five dead and almost one hundred injured.
- 5–24 May – Yorkshire-born Amy Johnson becomes the first woman to fly solo from England to Australia (11,000 miles to landing at Darwin).
- 28 May – the BBC Symphony Orchestra is formed as a permanent full-scale ensemble under the directorship of Adrian Boult. It gives its first concert on 22 October at the Queen's Hall, London.
- 5 July – the Seventh Lambeth Conference of Anglican bishops opens. This conference condones the use of birth control in limited circumstances, a move away from the Christian views on contraception expressed by the Sixth Conference a decade earlier.
- 10 July – Mental Treatment Act 1930 provides for free voluntary treatment for psychiatric conditions and for psychiatric outpatient clinics, replaces the term "asylum" with "mental hospital" and reorganises the Board of Control for Lunacy and Mental Deficiency.
- 14 July – transmission by the BBC of the first experimental television play, The Man With the Flower in His Mouth.
- 25 July – Laurence Olivier marries actress Jill Esmond.
- 29 July – British airship R100 sets out for a successful 78-hour passage to Canada.
- 1 August
  - Housing Act (promoted by Arthur Greenwood, Minister of Health) provides government subsidy for slum clearance, and construction of further new council houses as replacements.
  - Poor Prisoners' Defence Act provides for limited extension of legal aid.
- 7 August – two million people are unemployed.
- 16 August – the first British Empire Games open in Hamilton, Ontario, Canada.
- 29 August – remaining inhabitants of the island of St Kilda, Scotland, are voluntarily evacuated to the mainland.
- 12 September – England cricketer Wilfred Rhodes plays the final match in his international career, by taking 5 for 95 for H. D. G. Leveson Gower's XI, against the Australians. At the age of 52, he also becomes the oldest man to play in a Test match.
- 24 September – first performance of Noël Coward's comedy Private Lives at the Phoenix Theatre (London) featuring Coward, Gertrude Lawrence and Laurence Olivier in the cast.
- 1 October
  - Fourteen miners are killed in an explosion in a coal pit near Cannock, Staffordshire.
  - End of Weihaiwei under British rule as it is returned to China.
- 5 October – British airship R101 crashes in France en route to India on its maiden overseas voyage killing 48 of the 54 on board.
- 6–10 October – annual Labour Party Conference (at Llandudno), the first chaired by a woman, Susan Lawrence, M.P. Oswald Mosley unsuccessfully attempts to persuade it to adopt the 'Mosley Memorandum' on tackling unemployment.
- 20 October – the "Passfield white paper" demands restrictions on Jewish immigration into Mandatory Palestine.
- 12 November – first Round Table Conference on the future status of India opens in London.
- 25 November – Cecil George Paine, a pathologist at the Sheffield Royal Infirmary, achieves the first recorded cure (of an eye infection) using penicillin.
- December – Youth Hostels Association opens its first hostel, at Pennant Hall near Llanrwst in North Wales.
- 20 December – R v Betts and Ridley: a landmark case in English criminal law which establishes that it is not necessary for an accessory actually to be present when an offence is carried out in order to be convicted of a crime.
- 24 December – inventor Harry Grindell Matthews demonstrates his device to project pictures to the clouds in London.

=== Undated ===
- 1930–1935 – unemployment averages more than 18% in Britain.
- Start of local authorities' assisted wiring scheme to encourage people to connect their homes to the public electricity supply.
- Rosemary Bank is discovered approximately 75 miles (121 km) west of Scotland by the survey vessel HMS Rosemary.
- New offices for Crawford's Advertising Agency at 233 High Holborn, London, designed by Frederick Etchells with Herbert A. Welch, are Britain's earliest significant example of the International Style in architecture.
- Philco produces the first of its "Baby grand" designs of radio of which it will sell two million.

== Publications ==
- Agatha Christie's first Miss Marple novel, The Murder at the Vicarage.
- An Anthology of War Poems, compiled by Frederick Brereton.
- T. S. Eliot's poem Ash Wednesday.
- W. Somerset Maugham's novel Cakes and Ale.
- J. B. Priestley's novel Angel Pavement.
- Arthur Ransome's children's novel Swallows and Amazons.
- Dorothy L. Sayers' novels Strong Poison and The Documents in the Case (only the former featuring Lord Peter Wimsey).
- W. C. Sellar and R. J. Yeatman's parodic history book 1066 and All That.
- Evelyn Waugh's novel Vile Bodies.

== Births ==
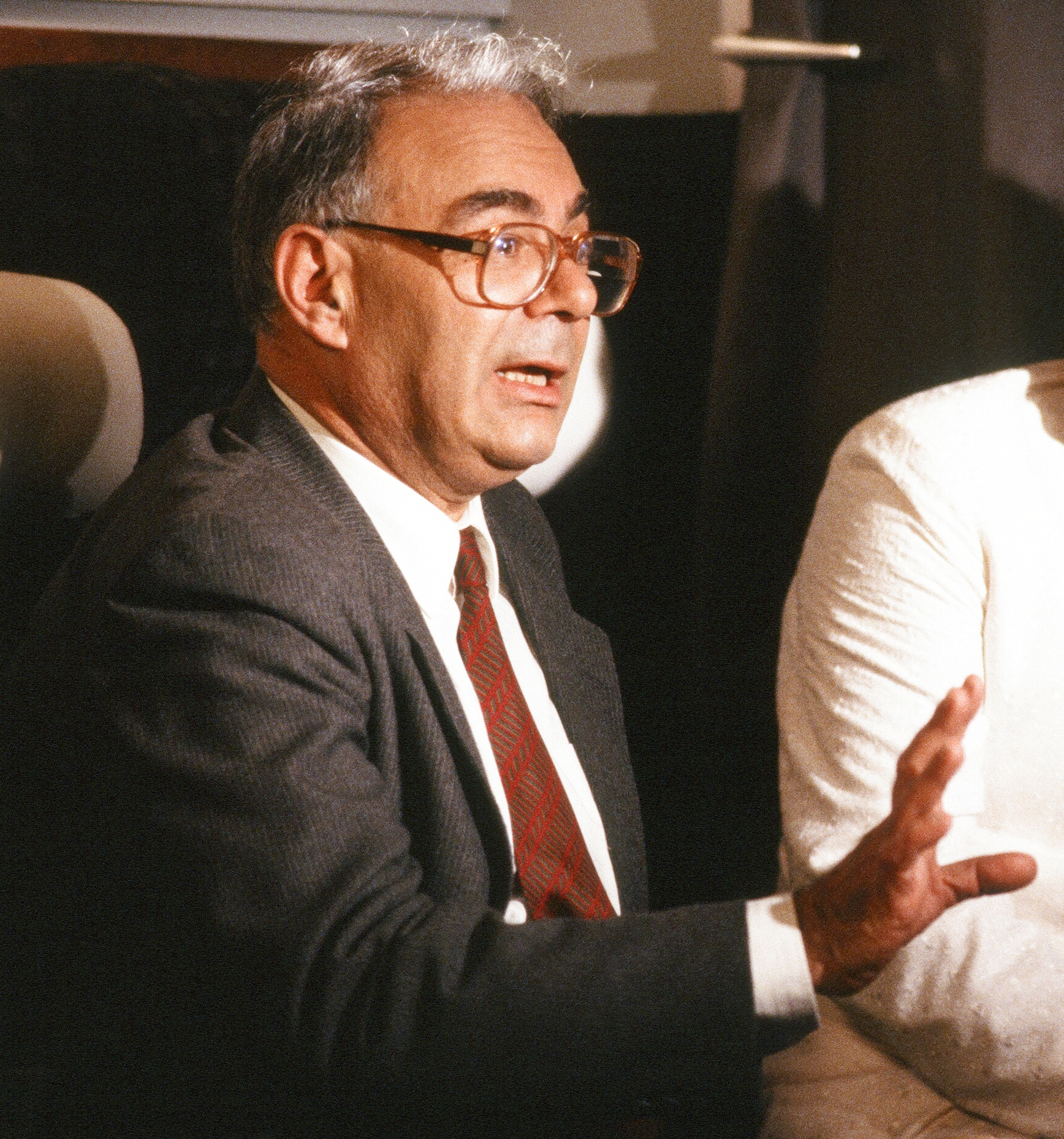
Lionel Blue

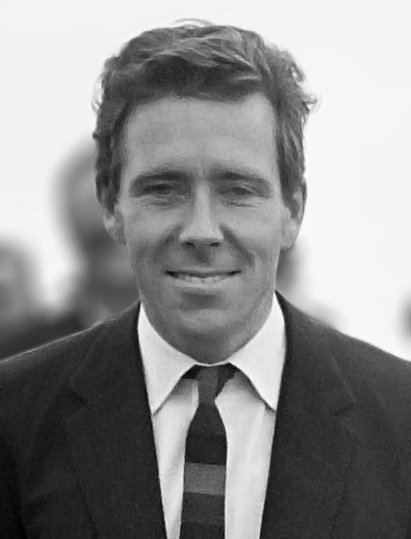
Antony Armstrong-Jones, 1st Earl of Snowdon

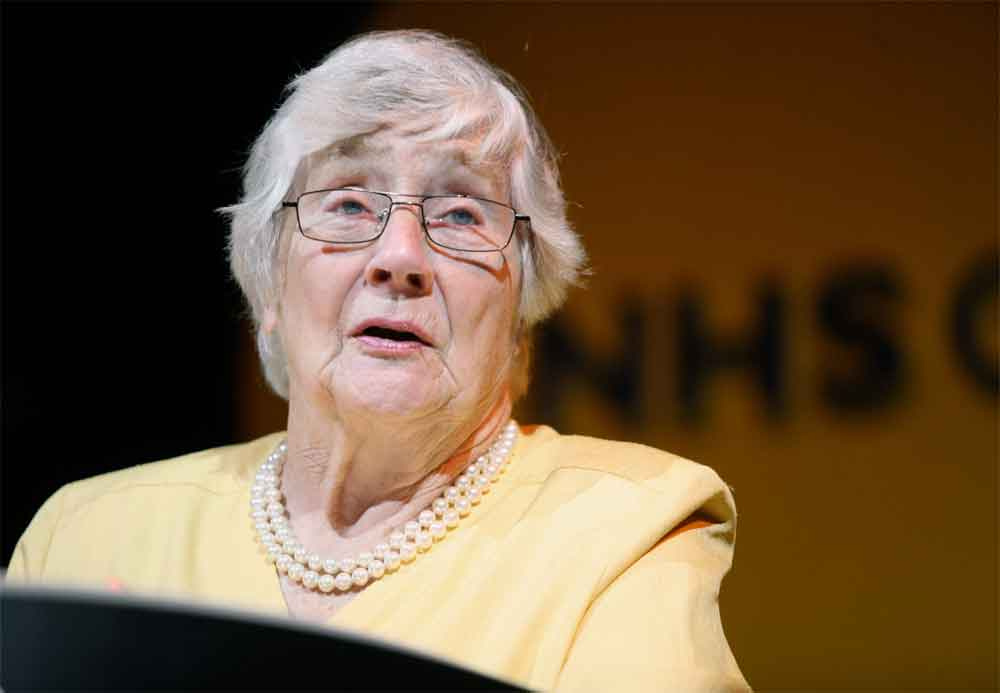
Shirley Williams

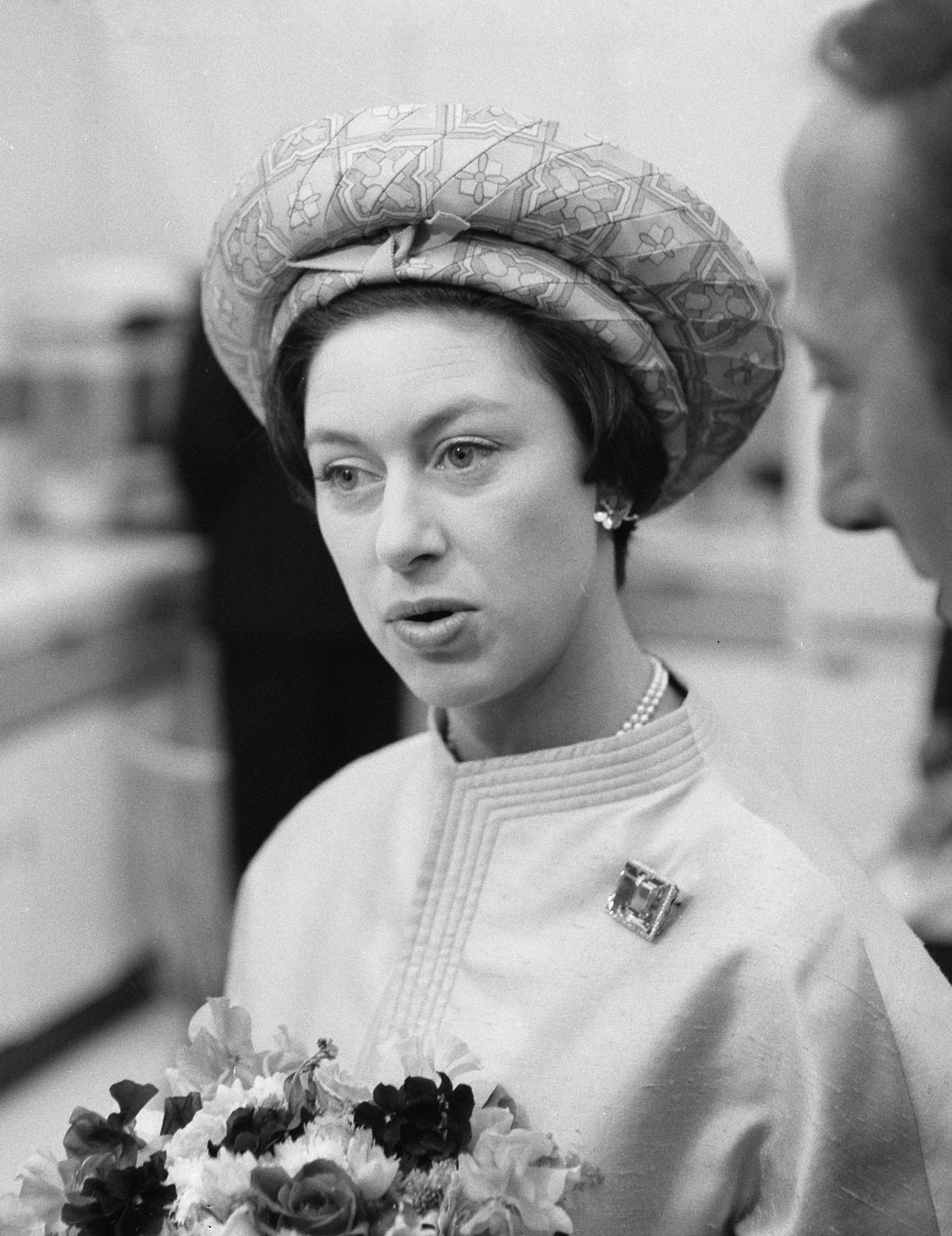
Princess Margaret, Countess of Snowdon

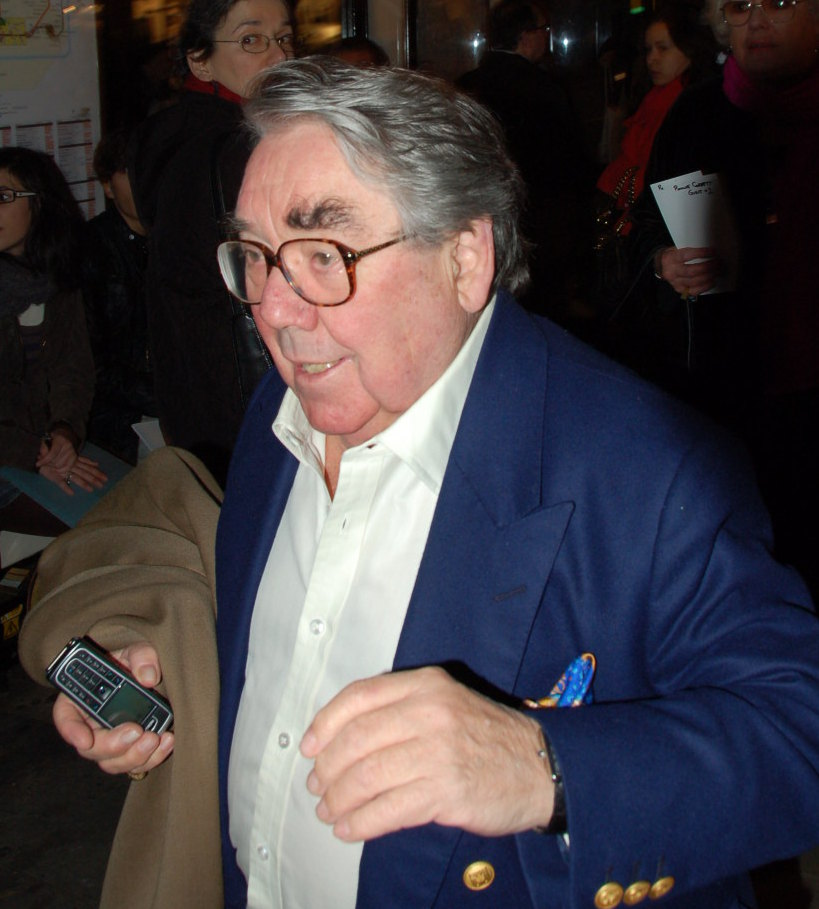
Ronnie Corbett

- 4 January – Iain Cuthbertson, actor (died 2009)
- 9 January – Ray Horrocks, businessman (died 2011)
- 12 January – Bruce Lansbury, British-American television producer and screenwriter (died 2017)
- 17 January – Monica Furlong, author and journalist (died 2003)
- 20 January
  - Richard Coleman, actor (died 2008)
  - Christopher Elrington, historian (died 2009)
- 29 January – John Junkin, actor and screenwriter (died 2006)
- 1 February – Peter Tapsell, politician, Father of the House (died 2018)
- 2 February – Bernard Hunt, golfer (died 2013)
- 3 February – Gillian Ayres, painter and printmaker (died 2018)
- 6 February – Lionel Blue, reform rabbi (died 2016)
- 11 February – Mary Quant, fashion designer (died 2023)
- 13 February – Ronald Stretton, track cyclist (died 2012)
- 16 February
  - Peter Adamson, actor (died 2002)
  - John Cairney, actor (died 2023)
- 17 February – Ruth Rendell, crime fiction writer (died 2015)
- 20 February
  - Ken Jones, actor (died 2014)
  - Richard Lynn, English psychologist and author (died 2023)
- 24 February – Norman Bleehen, British oncologist (died 2008)
- 25 February – Wendy Beckett, contemplative nun and art historian (died 2018)
- 27 February – John Straffen, serial killer (died 2007)
- 28 February – Diane Holland, actress (died 2009)
- 2 March – Pat Arrowsmith, peace campaigner (died 2023)
- 7 March
  - Antony Armstrong-Jones, 1st Earl of Snowdon, photographer and filmmaker (died 2017)
  - Daphne Osborne, botanist (died 2006)
- 8 March – Douglas Hurd, politician
- 11 March – David Gentleman, English artist and illustrator
- 12 March – Antony Acland, diplomat (died 2021)
- 13 March – Vera Selby, snooker and billiards player (died 2023)
- 19 March – Ernest Hall, businessman (died 2024)
- 23 March – Alexander Walker, film critic (died 2003)
- 24 March – Maude Storey, nurse (died 2003)
- 30 March
  - Nick Browne-Wilkinson, judge (died 2018)
  - Rolf Harris, Australian-born British cartoonist, singer, television presenter and sex offender (died 2023)
- 2 April – Roddy Maude-Roxby, actor
- 5 April – John Harris, politician (died 2001)
- 7 April – Jane Priestman, designer (died 2021)
- 8 April – Dorothy Tutin, actress (died 2001)
- 9 April – Ian Walters, sculptor (died 2006)
- 11 April
  - Clive Exton, screenwriter (died 2007)
  - Ronald Fraser, comedy actor (died 1997)
- 12 April – Bryan Magee, philosopher and politician (died 2019)
- 16 April – Alan Truscott, Anglo-American bridge player (died 2005)
- 17 April – Chris Barber, jazz trombonist and bandleader (died 2021)
- 20 April – Antony Jay, writer, television scriptwriter, broadcaster and director (died 2016)
- 21 April – Alec Bregonzi, actor (died 2006)
- 23 April – Michael Bowen, Gibraltarian-English archbishop (died 2019)
- 1 May – Peter Taylor, Baron Taylor of Gosforth, judge (died 1997)
- 3 May – David Harrison, chemist and academic (died 2023)
- 4 May
  - Bill Eyden, jazz drummer (died 2004)
  - Ron Pickering, athletics coach and commentator (died 1991)
- 7 May – John Smith, Baron Kirkhill, politician (died 2023)
- 8 May – Heather Harper, Northern Irish operatic soprano (died 2019)
- 9 May – Joan Sims, actress (died 2001)
- 11 May – Tony Church, actor (died 2008)
- 22 May – Kenny Ball, jazz trumpeter and bandleader (died 2013)
- 28 May – Julian Slade, musical theatre composer (died 2006)
- 1 June
  - John Lemmon, logician and philosopher (died 1966)
  - Edward Woodward, actor and singer (died 2009)
- 4 June
  - Edward Kelsey, actor (died 2019)
  - Bill Treacher, actor (died 2022)
  - John Wall, judge (died 2008)
- 5 June – Peter Landin, computer scientist (died 2009)
- 6 June – Frank Tyson, cricketer (died 2015)
- 7 June – Michael Baughen, bishop and hymn-writer
- 8 June
  - Michael Codron, theatre producer and manager
  - Julian Haviland, journalist (died 2023)
- 11 June
  - Roy Fisher, poet and jazz pianist (died 2017)
  - Duncan Kyle, novelist (died 2000)
- 15 June – John Fretwell, English soldier and diplomat, British Ambassador to France (died 2017)
- 21 June – Gerald Kaufman, politician, Father of the House (died 2017)
- 22 June – Patricia Nielsen, swimmer (died 1985)
- 23 June
  - John Elliot, historian (died 2022)
  - Anthony Thwaite, poet and critic (died 2021)
- 24 June – William Gaskill, theatre director (died 2016)
- 29 June – Frank Johnston, Anglican priest, military chaplain (died 2023)
- 1 July – Ron Hughes, footballer (died 2019)
- 7 July – Hamish MacInnes, Scottish mountaineer, mountain search and rescuer, author and advisor (died 2020)
- 8 July – John Little, Scottish football defender (died 2017)
- 11 July – Julia Trevelyan Oman, stage designer (died 2003)
- 12 July – Paul Briscoe, diarist and schoolteacher (died 2010)
- 13 July – Richard D. Lewis, polyglot cross-cultural communication consultant and author
- 17 July
  - Ray Galton, comedy scriptwriter (died 2018)
  - Brian Statham, cricketer (died 2000)
- 18 July
  - Burt Kwouk, film actor (died 2016)
  - Ted Paige, physicist (died 2004)
- 20 July – Sally Ann Howes, singer and actress (died 2021)
- 22 July
  - Jill Adams, actress and model (died 2008)
  - Jeremy Lloyd, actor and screenwriter (died 2014)
- 24 July – Charles Hambro, Baron Hambro, banker (died 2002)
- 26 July – Barbara Jefford, stage actress (died 2020)
- 27 July
  - Bomber Wells, cricketer (died 2008)
  - Shirley Williams, co-founder of the Social Democratic Party (died 2021)
- 8 August – Barry Unsworth, novelist (died 2012)
- 13 August – Bernard Manning, comedian (died 2007)
- 14 August – Liz Fraser, actress (died 2018)
- 15 August – Stephen Tumim, judge and prison inspector (died 2003)
- 17 August – Ted Hughes, poet laureate (died 1998)
- 20 August – Michael Green, theologian (died 2019)
- 21 August – Princess Margaret Rose, later Princess Margaret, Countess of Snowdon (died 2002)
- 24 August – Ian Nairn, journalist and writer (died 1983)
- 25 August
  - Sean Connery, Scottish actor (died 2020)
  - Crispin Tickell, diplomat, environmentalist and academic (died 2022)
- 28 August – Windsor Davies, actor (died 2019)
- 16 September – John Jympson, film editor (died 2003)
- 20 September – Michael Kidron, cartographer (died 2003)
- 21 September
  - Dawn Addams, actress (died 1985)
  - Bob Stokoe, footballer and football manager (died 2004)
- 24 September – Bernard Nevill, textile designer (died 2019)
- 26 September – Joe Brown, climber (died 2020)
- 29 September – Colin Dexter, detective fiction writer (died 2017)
- 4 October – William Summers, jeweller (died 2002)
- 5 October – David Mellor, designer, manufacturer and retailer (died 2009)
- 10 October – Harold Pinter, playwright, Nobel Prize laureate (died 2008)
- 11 October – Ronnie Simpson, footballer (died 2004)
- 15 October
  - Colin McDonald, footballer (died 2026)
  - Anne Mueller, civil servant (died 2000)
- 18 October
  - Trevor Bell, artist (died 2017)
  - David Tomblin, film director (died 2005)
- 19 October
  - Denys Jones, footballer (died 2003)
  - Mavis Nicholson, writer and broadcaster (died 2022)
- 20 October – R. J. Hollingdale, biographer (died 2001)
- 24 October – Elaine Feinstein, poet, novelist and literary biographer (died 2019)
- 27 October – Leo Baxendale, comic artist (died 2017)
- 28 October – Bernie Ecclestone, auto racing tycoon
- 30 October – Stanley Sadie, musicologist (died 2005)
- 3 November – John Biffen, politician (died 2007)
- 11 November – Vernon Handley, orchestral conductor (died 2008)
- 14 November
  - Shirley Crabtree, "Big Daddy", professional wrestler (died 1997)
  - Elisabeth Frink, sculptor (died 1993)
  - Michael Robbins, actor (died 1992)
- 15 November – J. G. Ballard, China-born fiction writer (died 2009)
- 21 November – Judith Pierce, operatic soprano (died 2003)
- 22 November
  - Peter Hall, theatre director (died 2017)
  - Peter Hurford, organist (died 2019)
- 29 November
  - Shirley Porter, politician (died 2026)
  - Dennis Weatherstone, banker and businessman (died 2008)
- 1 December
  - Ken Box, track and field sprinter (died 2022)
  - Matt Monro, singer (died 1985)
- 4 December – Ronnie Corbett, comic performer (died 2016)
- 5 December – Jeremy Sandford, television screenwriter (died 2003)
- 8 December
  - Julian Critchley, journalist and politician (died 2000)
  - Stan Richards, actor (died 2005)
- 10 December – Michael Jopling, farmer and politician, Minister of Agriculture, Fisheries and Food
- 11 December – David Plowright, television producer (died 2006)
- 12 December – Gwyneth Dunwoody, politician (died 2008)
- 26 December – Donald Moffat, actor (died 2018)
- 27 December – Wilfrid Sheed, English-born American writer (died 2011)
- 28 December – Gladys Ambrose, actress (died 1998)
- 30 December – Roy Calne, surgeon, pioneer of transplantation (died 2024)

== Deaths ==
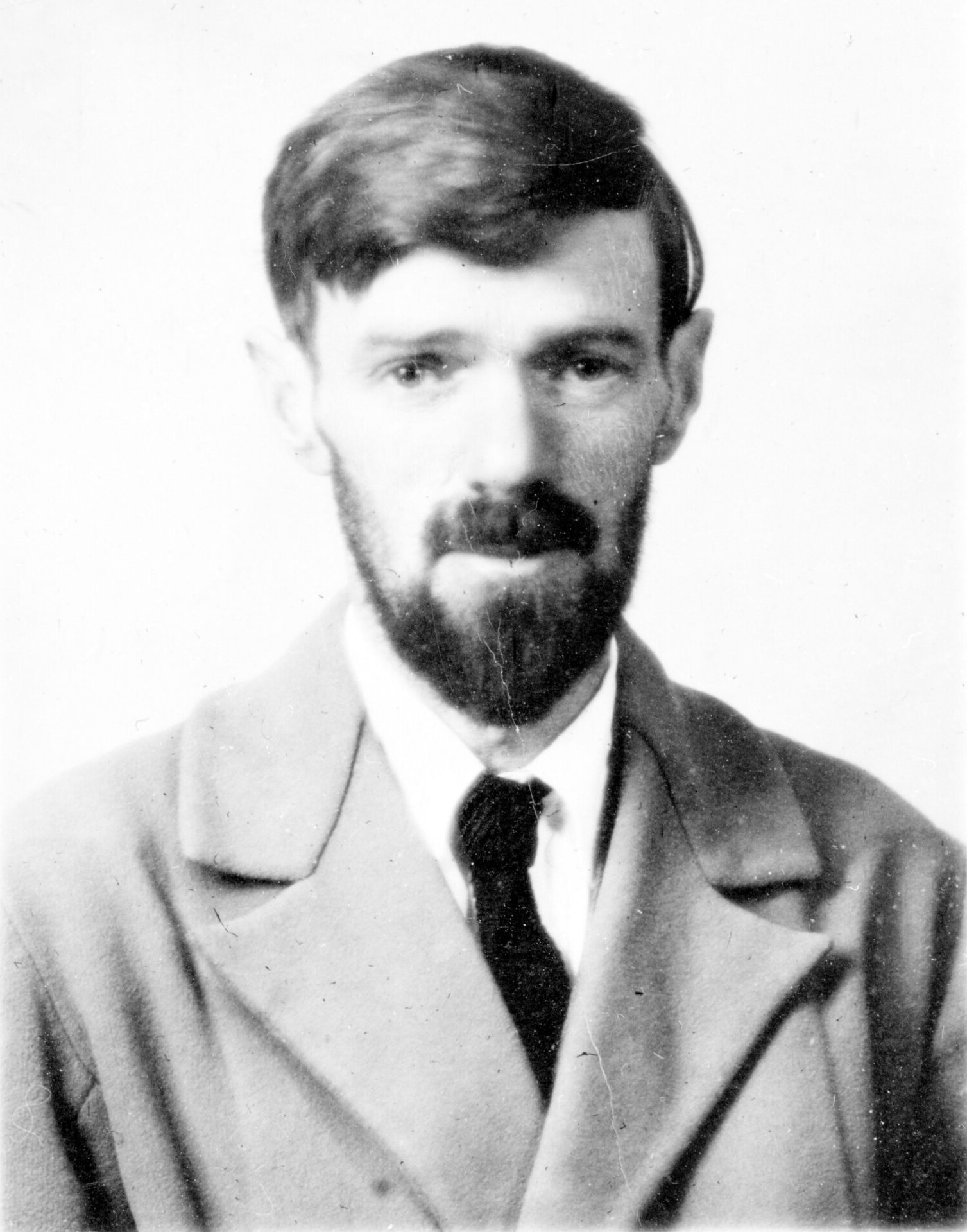
D. H. Lawrence

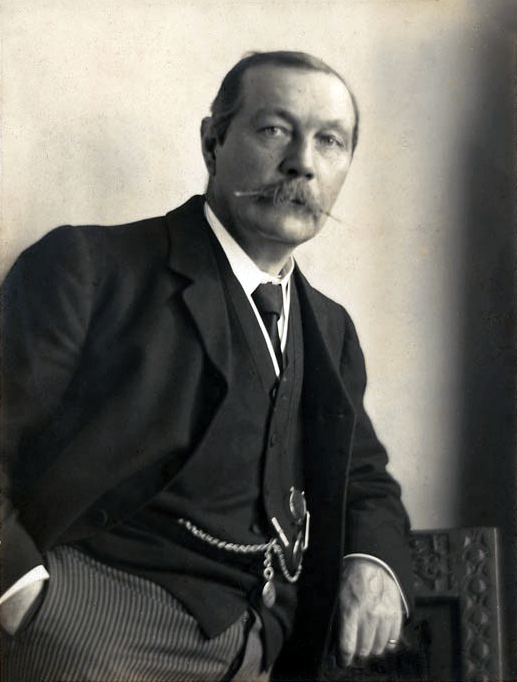
Arthur Conan Doyle

- 19 January – Frank P. Ramsey, mathematician, died of jaundice (born 1903)
- 21 January – Hugh Longbourne Callendar, physicist (born 1863)
- 22 January – Reginald Brett, 2nd Viscount Esher, politician and courtier (born 1852)
- 27 February – Joseph Wright, philologist and lexicographer (born 1855)
- 28 February – Sir Perceval Maitland Laurence, classical scholar, South African judge and a benefactor of the University of Cambridge (b. 1854)
- 2 March – D. H. Lawrence, writer, died of complications from tuberculosis in France (born 1885)
- 19 March – Arthur Balfour, Prime Minister of the United Kingdom (born 1848)
- 24 March – Henry Faulds, Scottish-born medical missionary, pioneer in the forensic study of fingerprints (born 1843)
- 10 April – Alfred Williams, "hammerman poet" (born 1877)
- 21 April – Robert Bridges, poet laureate (born 1844)
- 1 May – Richard Bell, Labour politician (died 1859)
- 25 May – Randall Davidson, Archbishop of Canterbury (born 1848)
- 13 June – Sir Henry Segrave, land and water speed record holder, killed in speedboat accident on Windermere (born 1896)
- 7 July – Sir Arthur Conan Doyle, Scottish-born fiction writer (born 1859)
- 12 August – Sir Horace Smith-Dorrien, general (born 1858)
- 21 August – Sir Aston Webb, architect (born 1849)
- 22 August – Christopher Wood, painter, suicide (born 1901)
- 24 August – Tom Norman, showman (born 1860)
- 28 August – Bobby Walker, Scottish footballer (born 1879)
- 29 August – William Archibald Spooner, scholar, Anglican priest and metathesist (born 1844)
- 6 September – Sir James Guthrie, Scottish painter (born 1859)
- 4 November – Evelyn Colyer, tennis player (born 1902)
- 27 November – Johnny Tyldesley, cricketer (born 1873)
- 17 December – Peter Warlock (Philip Heseltine), composer, probable suicide (born 1894)
- 22 December – Neil Munro, Scottish humorist, fiction writer and critic (born 1863)

== See also ==
- List of British films of 1930
