= Pioneer Days (1930 film) =

1930 film by Burt Gillett

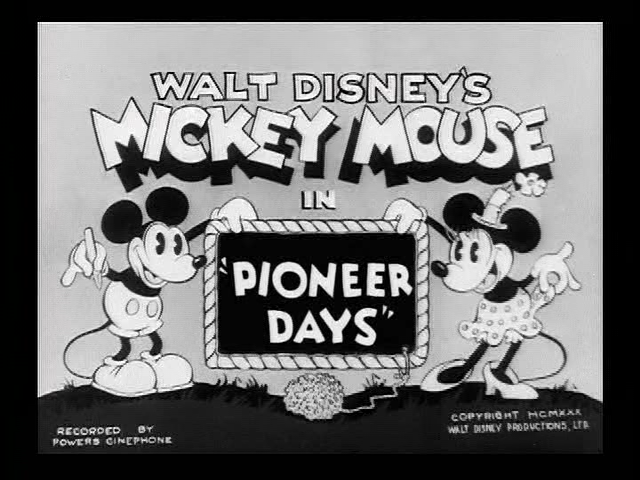
- Title card
- Directed by: Burt Gillett
- Produced by: Walt Disney
- Music by: Bert Lewis
- Color process: Black and white
- Production company: Walt Disney Productions
- Distributed by: Columbia Pictures
- Release date: November 20, 1930
- Running time: 7 min
- Country: United States
- Language: English

Pioneer Days is a 1930 American animated short film directed by Burt Gillett. It was released on November 20, 1930. It is the 24th film of the Mickey Mouse series.

Due to being published in 1930, the cartoon entered the public domain on January 1, 2026.

== Plot ==
The short.

Mickey Mouse and Minnie Mouse lead a caravan of covered wagons heading west through the desert, playing the banjo and singing "Oh! Susanna". Mickey boasts to Minnie that he is not scared of Indians, but his confidence will be tested—a tribe of wolf-like Indians have spotted the settlers, and they plan for war, wearing feathered headdresses and wielding tomahawks as they dance around their campfire. Meanwhile, Mickey and the other settlers have circled their wagons for the evening, where they sing and dance.

The Indian tribe arrives, and Mickey sounds the alarm that the Indians are attacking. The settlers shoot guns at the Indians, and the attackers shoot arrows—hitting Mickey in the rear end at several points, to no lasting harm. Mickey scares away some Indians by shooting them with quills from a porcupine. Minnie is kidnapped and tied up by one Indian, and Mickey runs to her rescue. While Mickey and the Indian are fighting, Minnie settles things by dropping a hot coal down the Indian's pants. The mice return to the wagon train pretending to be a line of reinforcements; the Indians are routed and the settlers celebrate.

== Releases ==
The reissue print released in 1940 cut the last scene from the cartoon, showing Mickey and Minnie scaring the Indians away. The 1940 version irises out on Mickey rescuing Minnie from a single Indian with a hot coal. The 1940 version was subsequently shown on TV and released on laserdisc in the 1990s. The missing scene was restored for the 2002 Walt Disney Treasures DVD set Mickey Mouse in Black and White: The Classic Collection.

On the DVD set, an introduction for this short by Leonard Maltin warns, "It would be foolish to judge [these cartoons] some seventy years later in the context of today's manners and morals", although he doesn't specifically call attention to Pioneer Days' use of common Native American stereotypes.

The short was also seen on The Mickey Mouse Club (season 1, episode 15), and Good Morning, Mickey! episode 20.

== Reception ==
In Mickey's Movies: The Theatrical Films of Mickey Mouse, Gijs Grob writes: "The [cartoon] features spectacular animation, including a dance with long shadows around a bonfire (animated by Norm Ferguson), and two stunning scenes animated by Ben Sharpsteen: a complex attack scene, and an impressive shot taken from one of the horses circling the encampment, showing a moving background of wagons in perfect perspective. Also spectacular is a piece of animation by Wilfred Jackson: the fight between Mickey and a horrible Indian, who has kidnapped Mickey. The fight is shown in close-up, and contains complex movements between the two. It's scenes like these that show Disney maintaining his edge in the animation field."

On the Disney Film Project, Ryan Kilpatrick agrees: "The real action begins... when the Indians invade the wagon camp. From that point forward, it's inspired chaos. The scenes of frantic pioneers scrambling around and trying to evade the arrows are great and add to the sense of motion that moves through the final part of the short."

== Voice actors ==
- Mickey Mouse: Walt Disney
- Minnie Mouse: Marcellite Garner

== Home media ==
The short was released on December 2, 2002, on Walt Disney Treasures: Mickey Mouse in Black and White.

== See also ==
- Mickey Mouse (film series)
