= Judith Pierce =

English operatic soprano (1930–2003)

- Born: 21 November 1930; St Helens, Lancashire, England
- Died: 9 October 2003 (aged 72); Canterbury, Kent, England
- Occupation: Operatic soprano
- Years active: 1954–1976
- Spouse: Theo Barker (m. 1955; died 2001)

Judith Pierce (21 November 1930 – 9 October 2003) was an English operatic soprano. Having studied at the Royal Manchester College of Music and the Royal College of Music's Opera School in London, she performed with the Royal Opera House, Scottish Opera, Opera North, the English National Opera and at the Aldeburgh Festival and appeared on BBC Television, ITV and the Canadian Broadcasting Corporation. Pierce sung in productions of the operas by Benjamin Britten, Richard Wagner and Richard Strauss among others.

== Early life ==
Pierce was born in St Helens, Lancashire, England on 21 November 1930. Her mother was a professional contralto singer. Pierce was brought up in Lancashire. When she was 16, she won a scholarship to study at the Royal Manchester College of Music for four years. Pierce then studied at the Royal College of Music's Opera School in London. She later had private tutoring from Edith Lukaschik in Munich on a Sadler's Wells's scholarship that she obtained and then with Audrey Langford in London.

== Career ==
Pierce performed with the Royal Opera House, Scottish Opera, Opera North, at the Aldeburgh Festival, where she was frequently cast in the operas of Benjamin Britten by the composer himself, and with the English National Opera. Countries she performed in Austria, Canada, Germany, Iceland, Italy, Poland, Portugal, South Africa and Yugoslavia. She appeared on BBC Television, ITV, and the Canadian Broadcasting Corporation. Since 1954, she sung the Countess in The Marriage of Figaro, Santuzza in Cavalleria rusticana, Giorgetta in Il tabarro, the Female Chorus in Britten's The Rape of Lucretia and the housekeeper Mrs. Grose in Britten's The Turn of the Screw. Pierce made her debut at Covent Garden in September 1958 in the minor role of Helmwige in Richard Wagner’s Die Walküre, and recorded the part the same year under Erich Leinsdorf for Decca, with George London, Birgit Nilsson and Jon Vickers.

She was awarded the Queen's Prize from the Royal College of Music in 1959. In October 1959, she sung Donna Anna in Don Giovanni, and again at short notice with the Carl Rosa Opera Company. Pierce she sung Elisabeth in Tannhäuser in February 1960. Pierce sung the titular role in Carl Maria von Weber's opera Euryanthe for Philopera in 1962. She returning to the same venue in 1963 for the title role in Rutland Boughton’s Celtic version of the Tristan and Iseult legend, the Thomas Hardy opera The Famous Tragedy of the Queen of Cornwall. In January 1965, Pierce made a cameo appearance in the first scene of Richard Strauss's Arabella as the Fortune Teller. In 1966, she was asked by the composer Alexander Gibson to join the Scottish Opera to sing the role of Lady Billows in Britten's opera Albert Herring in 1967. Pierce reprised the role for a European tour that took in Iceland, the Maggio Musicale, Florence, and, in a production for Phoenix Opera by the role's original creator, Joan Cross, at the Brighton Festival in 1968.

She was cast by Gibson in the role of Marianne in Strauss's Der Rosenkavalier in Anthony Besch’s 1971 production and also sang the part of Queen Elizabeth in Britten's Gloriana at Haddo House. Pierce returned to Haddo House in 1972 and sung the Female Chorus in Britten's The Rape of Lucretia. She stayed with Scottish Opera and sung with them in 1976, gradually reverting to comprimario status.

== Personal life and death ==
Pierce was married to the economic and social historian Theo Barker from 2 August 1955 to his death in 2001. She died in Canterbury on 9 October 2003.
