= Should a Doctor Tell? (1930 film) =

1930 film

- Trade show advertisement
- Directed by: H. Manning Haynes
- Written by: G.B. Samuelson; Walter Summers; Edgar Wallace
- Produced by: S.W. Smith
- Starring: Basil Gill; Norah Baring; Maurice Evans
- Cinematography: Jack MacKenzie; Robert Martin
- Production company: British Lion Film Corporation
- Distributed by: British Lion Film Corporation
- Release date: 26 September 1930
- Running time: 52 minutes
- Country: United Kingdom
- Language: English

Should a Doctor Tell? is a 1930 British drama film directed by H. Manning Haynes and starring Basil Gill, Norah Baring and Maurice Evans. It was written by G.B. Samuelson, Walter Summers and Edgar Wallace, and was produced as a quota quickie at Beaconsfield Studios by British Lion.

The screenplay concerns a doctor who agonises over breaking the hypocratic oath.

== Preservation status ==
The British Film Institute National Archive holds a collection of ephemera but no film or video materials.

== Plot ==
Doctor Bruce Smith abides by his strict rules about patient confidentiality. He learns that his son Roger is in love with Joan Murray, an unmarried girl who had previously consulted him when pregnant. Joan cannot bring herself tell Roger the truth, and demands of his father that he does not betray her confidence. The doctor is torn between his professional principles and his duty as a father.

== Cast ==
- Basil Gill as Dr. Bruce Smith
- Norah Baring as Joan Murray
- Maurice Evans as Roger Smith
- Gladys Jennings as the wife
- Anna Neagle as Muriel Ashton
- A. G. Poulton as Judge
- Harvey Braban as Prosecution

== Reception ==
Kine Weekly wrote: "Modern emotional problem play, which has an interesting as well as entertaining story, is capably acted, and intelligently directed. The picture is typically English in character, sentiment, an atmosphere, and cleverly steers clear of nauseating sensationalism. The strong feminine appeal, too, makes this picture an attraction."

The Daily Film Renter wrote: "Actual story slight, but good suspense interest and realism obtained by sound acting under decidedly clever direction, keeps the interest throughout. ... Norah Baring strikes one as scarcely equal to the full emotional possibilities of a difficult part; her restraint is a virtue, but it is sometimes overdone. Basil Gill and Maurice Evans, as the doctor and his son, are both excellent."

Variety wrote: "An antique in every department. Add to this poor lighting and photography in spots. Just an inexcusable, poorly cast, directed and written thing that has only a suggestive title which may lure some of the lesser grind house customers in America to part with 15¢ or 25¢ in the expectancy of seeing something. Actionless, the theme depending upon formal court procedure and bromidic speech, without a comely woman and with an elderly doctor, who decides not to tell in the first five minutes. Then he over-acts the rest of the way. The whole is stupidly insipid. Should a Doctor Tell is something that can be compared only to a poor American indie production in the silent day. And it has sound. Even a nightingale whistles during a love scene."
