= Just for a Song =

1930 film

- Frame from the film
- Directed by: Gareth Gundrey
- Written by: Desmond Carter; Gareth Gundrey
- Produced by: Michael Balcon
- Starring: Lillian Hall-Davis; Roy Royston; Constance Carpenter
- Music by: Louis Levy
- Production company: Gainsborough Pictures
- Distributed by: Ideal Films
- Release date: 11 March 1930
- Running time: 94 minutes
- Country: United Kingdom
- Language: English

Just for a Song is a 1930 British musical film directed by Gareth Gundrey and starring Lillian Hall-Davis, Roy Royston and Constance Carpenter. It was made at Islington Studios.

Some singing and dancing sequences were photographed in an early colour process, believed to be Pathécolor.

== Preservation status ==
The British Film Institute National Archive holds no ephemera, stills or film or video materials.

== Plot ==
Jack and ans his girlfriend Jill are two young variety artistes who get a theatre booking via their agent, Moss. Craddock, the booking manager, falls for Jill, and succeeds in splitting her and Jack up by bringing in singer Norma Wentworth. But Moss reunites the couple.

== Cast ==
- Lillian Hall-Davis as Norma Wentworth
- Roy Royston as Jack
- Constance Carpenter as Jill
- Cyril Ritchard as Craddock
- Nick Adams as agent
- Syd Crossley as Stage Manager
- Dick Henderson
- Albert Rebla
- Syd Seymour and His Mad Hatters as themselves

== Reception ==
Film Weekly wrote: "A British backstage film with, a few good moments. Fair."

Kine Weekly wrote: "A British drama of vaudeville life which develops on familiar American lines. The individual characterisation is exceptionally good, and a realistic atmosphere prevails. ... Lillian Davies gives rather a hard portrayal as Norma, but sings with good effect, and Constance Carpenter and Roy Royston make a satisfactory pair of lovers as Jack aud Jill. Cyril Ritchard and Nick Adams, however, easily steal the honours as Craddock and Moss respectively. V. Gareth Gundrey has unfolded the obvious story clearly, and receives considerable help from a cast of versatile and popular English artistes, but has not succeeded in introducing any originality into the proceedings apart from the main plot, there is a pleasing love interest, plenty of humour and a number of tuneful melodies. Technically, the production is unpretentious, and is not helped by the colour sequences, which are crude and obviously hand tinted."

== See also ==
- List of early color feature films
- List of lost films
