= Roy Royston =

English actor (1899–1976)

- Royston with Gina Palerme in Bric-a-Brac, 1915
- Born: Roy Charles Crowden; 5 April 1899; Mill Hill, London, England, U.K.
- Died: 7 October 1976 (aged 77); Kingston upon Thames, Surrey, England, U.K.
- Occupation: Actor
- Years active: 1912–1966

Roy Royston MC (born Roy Charles Crowden, 5 April 1899 – 7 October 1976) was an English actor who appeared in a large number of films between 1912 and 1966, beginning as a child actor. Most of his films were silents made before the First World War, during the last year of which he served as a pilot in the Royal Flying Corps and was awarded the Military Cross.

He later developed a career in musical theatre, and his swan song was an appearance as an elderly clergyman in a Hammer Horror film of 1966.

== Life ==
Born at Mill Hill, North London, Roy Charles Crowden took the stage name of "Roy Royston" while still a boy. He was educated at Lynton College and also privately and first appeared on the stage on 19 December 1910 in a revival of Maurice Maeterlinck's play The Blue Bird at the Haymarket Theatre.

Between 1912 and 1914 Royston was the child star of a large number of silent films, most made by Lewis Fitzhamon. His younger brother also became an actor and took the stage name of Gerald Royston.

Under his real name of Roy Crowden, in the later stages of the First World War he was commissioned into the British Army as a temporary second lieutenant and joined the Royal Flying Corps. In June 1918 he was awarded the Military Cross, the citation reading –

T./2nd Lt. Roy Charles Crowden, Gen. List and R.F.C. For conspicuous gallantry and devotion to duty during operations. Observing a column of enemy troops marching along a road, he descended to a very low altitude, bombed them, and threw the column into complete confusion. Later on the same day, he attacked and caused heavy casualties to enemy infantry who were advancing across country. On another occasion he attacked one of six enemy scouts and destroyed it. He showed great determination and a splendid offensive spirit.

After the war Royston briefly resumed his early career in silent films, playing leading roles in Mr. Wu (1919) and The Magistrate (1921), but he then turned his attention to the possibilities of musical theatre. From February to April 1923 he appeared in The Cousin from Nowhere at the Prince's Theatre, London, in which he did well enough to be cast as one of two leading men in C.B. Cochran's London production of the hit Broadway musical Little Nellie Kelly, which had a long run at the New Oxford Theatre between July 1923 and February 1924. In the show Royston played the part of New York millionaire and man about town Jack Lloyd, who is hot in pursuit of Nellie but is pipped at the post by an Irish-American labourer.

Having played an American in London, Royston moved to Broadway. In May 1924 he opened at the Jolson Theatre, New York, playing Jerry in Peg o' My Dreams, and in August at the Shubert, as Brian Valcourt in Marjorie. From August 1925 he appeared in the romance June Days as Austin Bevans, a young man who inherits a school for girls and experiments with his theory that girls need to learn nothing except charm.

On 8 October 1928 Royston opened in Ups-a-Daisy at the Shubert, playing Roy Lindbrooke, an adventurous young author. Also in the cast was Bob Hope, as a butler. Ups-a-Daisy ran for 64 performances.

In 1930 Royston starred opposite Lillian Hall-Davis in Michael Balcon's British musical film Just for a Song, and in 1935 he appeared on screen again in the comedy The Big Splash. He became part of a regular company with Leslie Henson, Richard Hearne, Louise Brown and Fred Emney. Following a leading part in Going Greek (1937), in 1938 Royston starred in Douglas Furber's Running Riot as a film stunt man in love with an out-of-work actress. The Sketch commented

Our Grecians of last year are "RUNNING RIOT" this year. Whither? Well, to film studios, Chinatown, and so forth ... Mr. Roy Royston is there as usual to put sentiment in the story, which he can do with a nice show of masculine vigour.

During the Second World War Royston again reverted to the name of Crowden and served in the Balloon Branch of the Royal Air Force Volunteer Reserve. On 1 March 1942 he was promoted from Flying Officer to temporary Flight Lieutenant. He returned to the theatre in 1943.

After a break in his film career of some thirty years, Royston played a clergyman in the Hammer Horror film The Plague of the Zombies (1966).

== Private life ==
Royston married firstly Laura Marguerite Gould, but this marriage was dissolved after his wife petitioned for divorce. He married secondly Dorothy Evelyn Taylor.

He died at Kingston upon Thames in Surrey on 7 October 1976.

== Filmography ==
- The Pony Who Paid the Rent (1912) (short) – Boy
- Repaying the Debt (1912) (short) – Boy
- A Day in the Country (1912) (short) – The Boy
- Children of the Forest (1912) (short) – The Boy
- A Double Life (1912) (short) – Gray
- A Bore of a Boy (1913) (short) – Bob
- The Girl Next Door (1913) (short) – Bobby
- A Day on Rollers (1913) (short) – Roy
- Algy's Tormentor (1913) (short) – Bob
- Daddy's Darlings (1913) (short) – Boy
- Little Willie's Apprenticeships (1913) (short) – Willie
- Three Little Vagabonds (1913) (short) – Willie
- Freddy's Dumb Playmates (1913) (short) – Freddy
- When the Hurricanes Visited the Doughnuts (1913) (short) – Buster
- When the Hurricanes Visited the Sawmills (1914) (short) – Buster
- When the Hurricanes Took Up Farming (1914) (short) – Buster
- When the Hurricanes Bought the Lino (1914) (short) – Buster
- The Loosened Plank (1914) (short) – The Boy
- One Summer's Day (1917)
- Mr. Wu (1919) – Basil Gregory
- The Magistrate (1921) – Farringdon
- The Shaming of the True (1930) (short) – Sir Frederick Fincke
- Just for a Song (1930) – Jack
- The Big Splash (1935) – Jack Trent
- The Plague of the Zombies (1966) – Vicar (final film role)

== Bibliography ==
- John Holmstrom, The Moving Picture Boy: An International Encyclopaedia from 1895 to 1995, Norwich, Michael Russell, 1996, p. 13.
