= Ulysses and the Sirens =

Ulysses and the Sirens may refer to:

- Ulysses and the Sirens (Waterhouse), an 1891 painting by John William Waterhouse
- Ulysses and the Sirens (Draper), a 1909 painting by Herbert James Draper
