= Ethel Warwick =

British actress and artist's model (1882–1951)

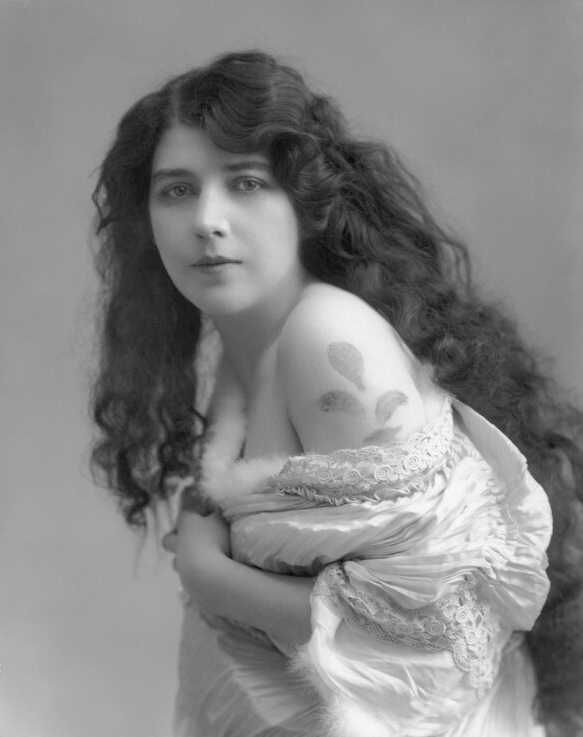
- Photograph from 1924
- Born: 13 October 1882; Hardingstone, Northampton, United Kingdom
- Died: 12 September 1951 (aged 68); Bognor Regis
- Occupations: Artists model; Actress
- Years active: 1900–1936
- Spouse: Edmund Waller (m. 1906; d. 1915)

Ethel Maude Warwick (13 October 1882 – 12 September 1951) was a British stage actress, appearing in both plays and films. Warwick was also a model for several artists, prominently for John William Godward.

== Biography ==
=== Early years ===
Ethel Maude Warwick was a daughter of Frank and Maude Warwick, and was born in Hardingstone, Northampton, on 13 October 1882. Her education began in Margate and Hampstead, but by the early 1890s she was studying to become an artist at the London Polytechnic.

Ethel became an artists model to help pay for her tuition at the London Polytechnic, which led to her meeting Herbert Draper; Draper used her as a model for several of his paintings, including The Lament for Icarus. Through him she became a favoured model for several artists, including John William Godward and Linley Sambourne, for whom she posed nude in a series of photographic studies. She was also sketched by James McNeill Whistler.

=== Acting career ===
Despite training to become an artist, Warwick instead began to take part in acting lessons at Henry Neville’s acting school during the late 1890s, and in July 1900 she made her debut by starring in The Corsican Brothers as Emilie de L'Esparre at the Grande Theatre, in Fulham.

Though still an artists model, Warwick continued to pose for many studies, photographs and portraits. During this time, she was most notably posing for Herbert Draper. However, on 24 March 1906, Warwick married stage actor and theatrical manager Edmund Waller, and therefore discontinued her modelling.

Edmund and Ethel had stage grandeur at the time of their marriage, and embarked on a worldwide tour together—in 1910 did they arrive at London. Whilst living at London they took management over the Queen's Theatre.

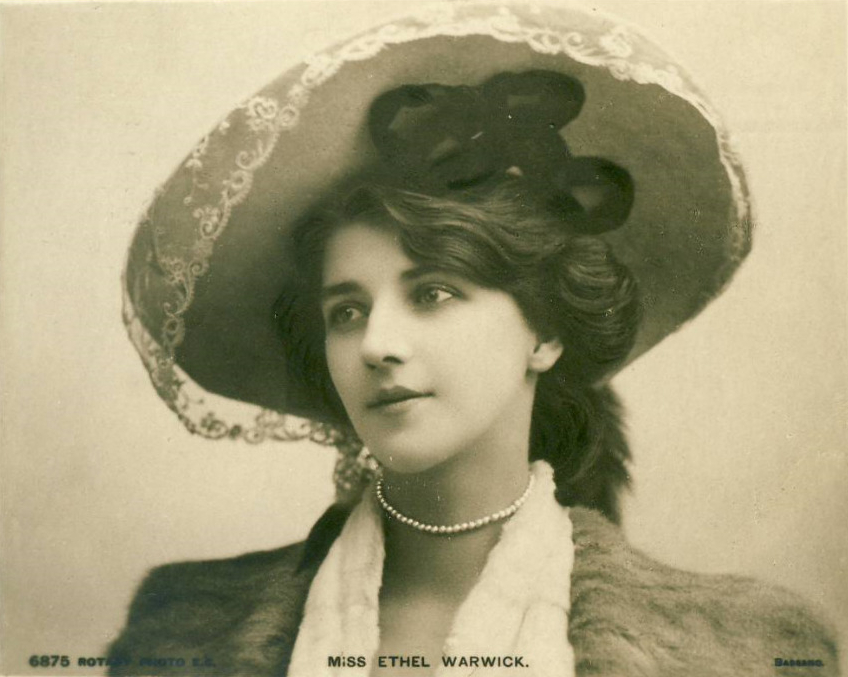
A photograph of Warwick, ca. 1930

In 1915 Warwick and Waller divorced, which, upon Ethel’s extravagant lifestyle, caused her to go bankrupt in 1923. Warwick still acted after this, and was well-known at the New Shakespeare Theatre in Stratford-upon-Avon.

=== Death ===
Ethel died in a Bognor Regis nursing home on 12 September 1951, presumably due to lung cancer.

== Selected filmography ==
- The Magistrate (1921)
- Keepers of Youth (1931)
- Bachelor's Baby (1932)
- Letting in the Sunshine (1933)
- The Man Outside (1933)

== Appearances in art ==
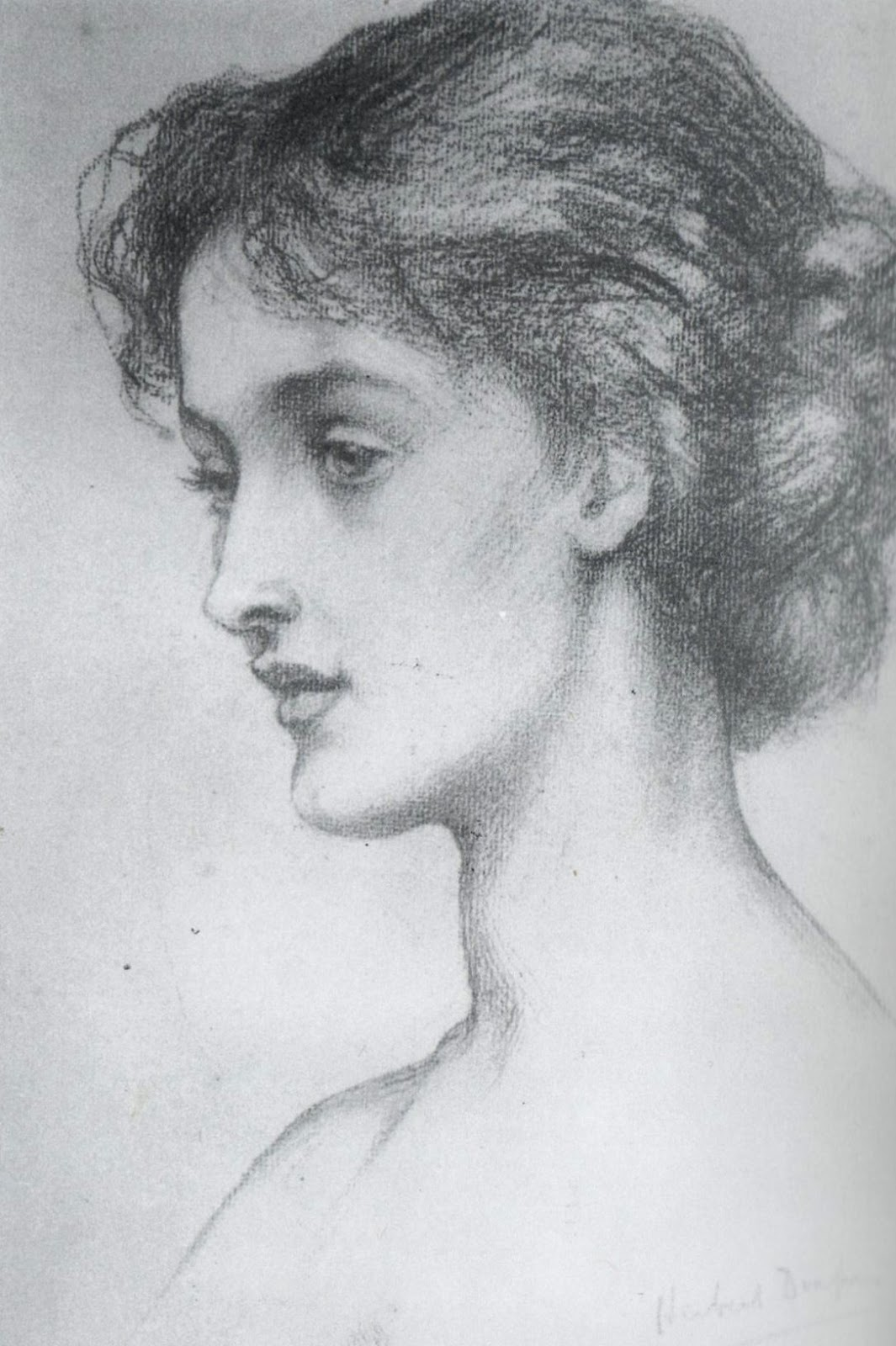
Ethel, a sketch by Herbert James Draper

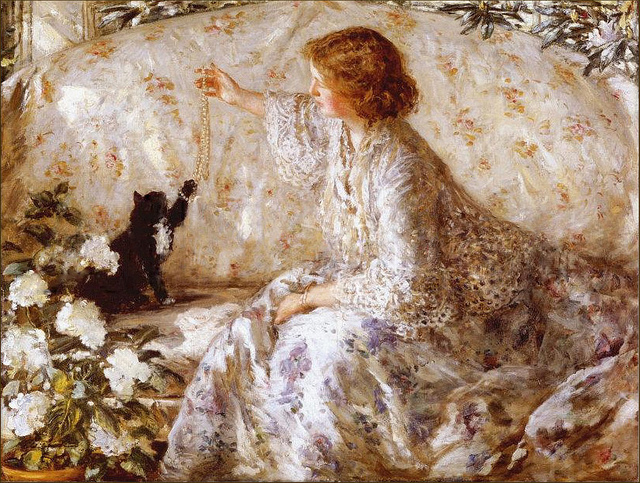
Hydrangeas. Oil on Canvas by Philip Wilson Steer, ca. 1901

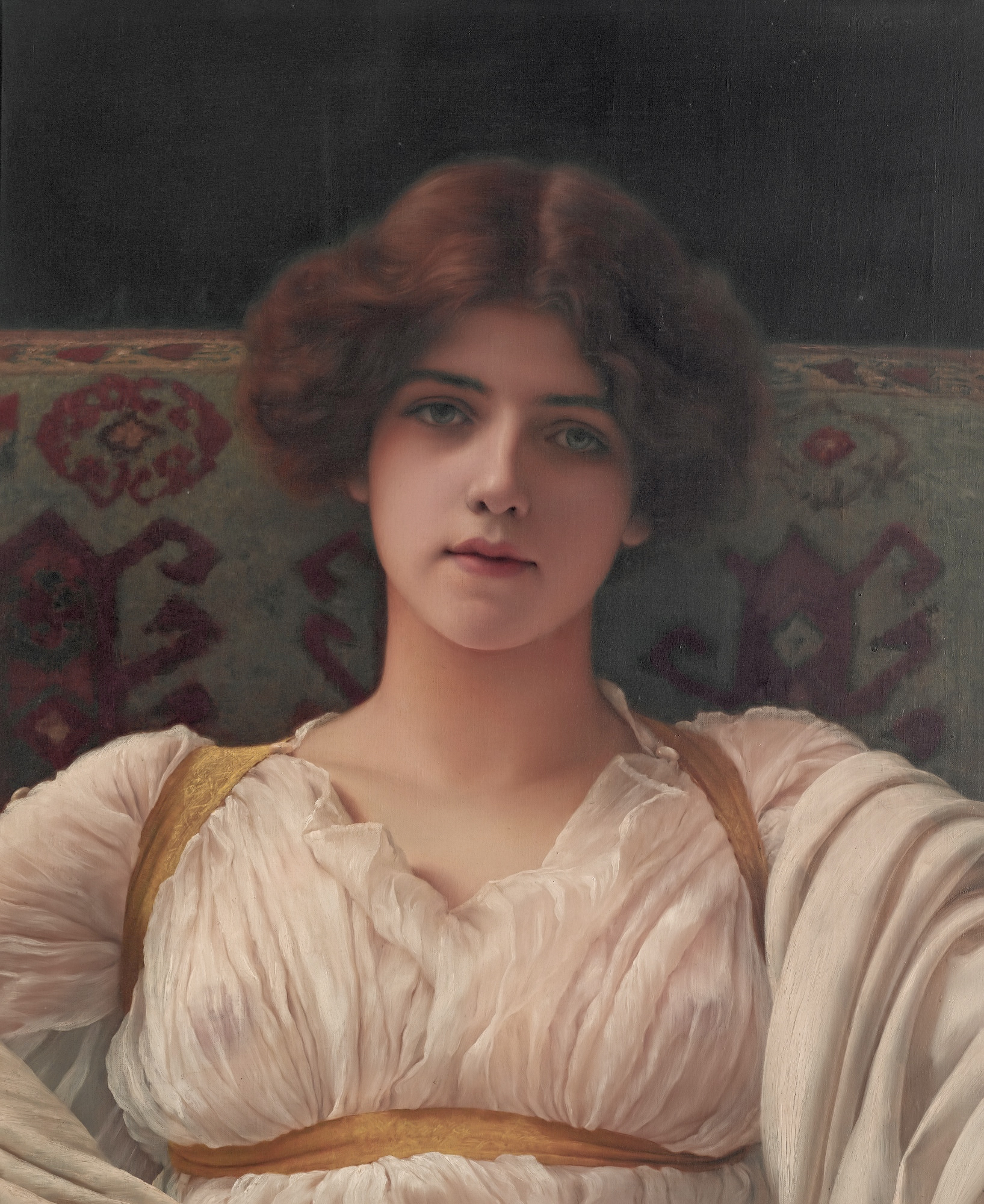
Study of Miss Ethel Warwick. Oil on canvas by John William Godward, ca. 1898

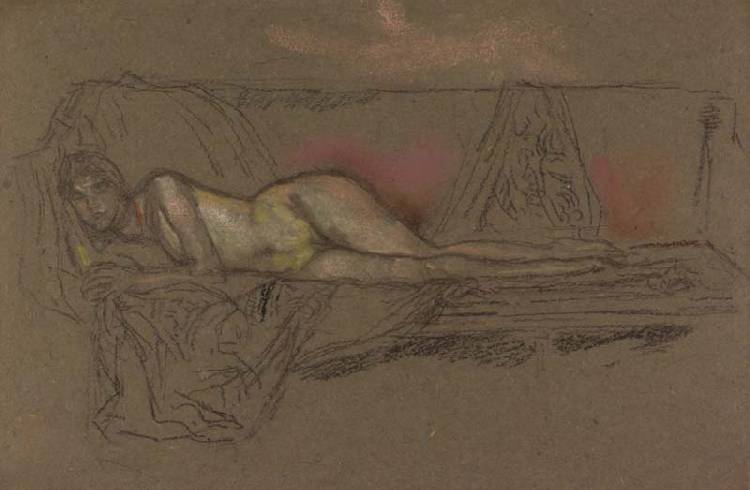
Ethel Warwick asleep on a sofa. Sketch by James Abbott McNeill Whistler, from 1900

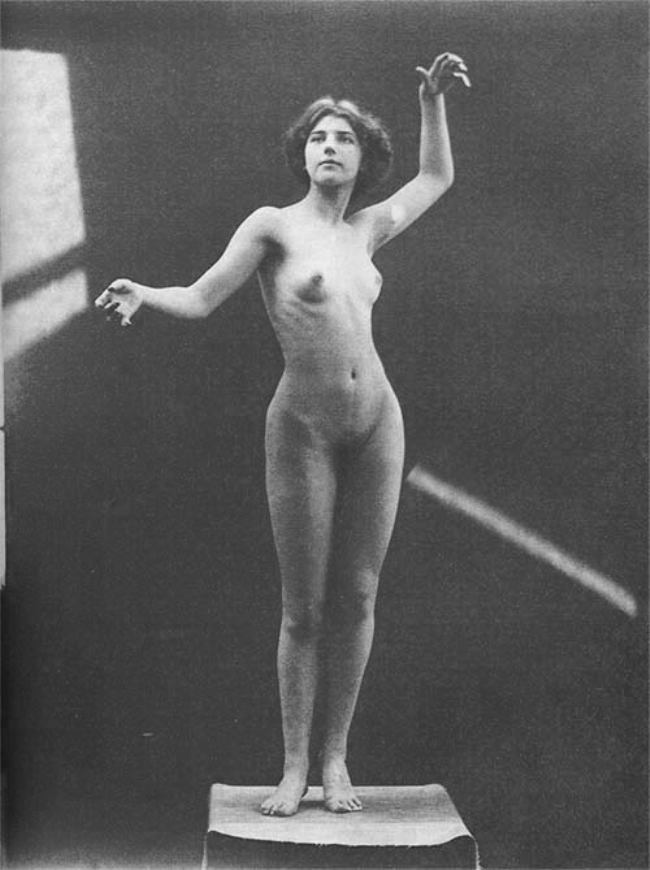
Study of Miss Ethel Warwick. Photograph by Linley Sambourne, ca. 1900

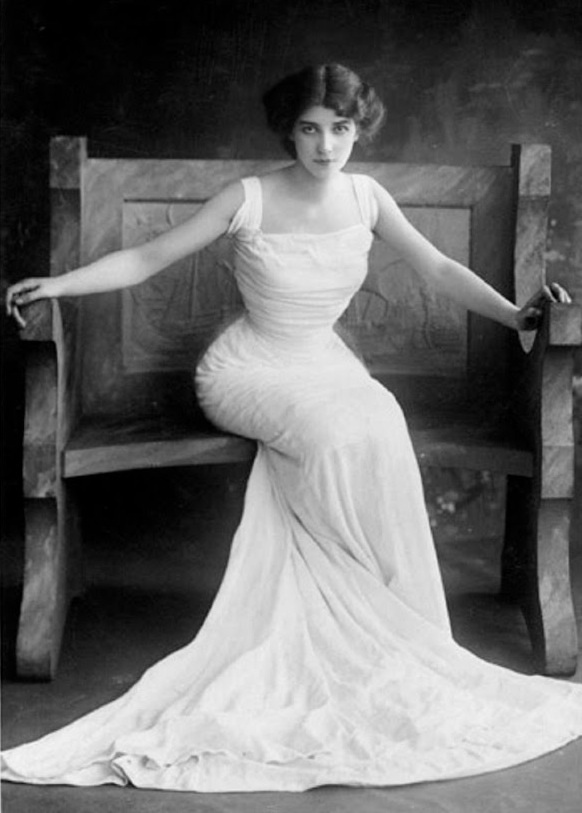
Promotional photograph, ca. 1900

== Bibliography ==
- Low, Rachael. The History of British Film The History of the British Film 1914 - 1918. Routledge, 2013.
