= The Magistrate (1921 film) =

1921 film

- Directed by: Bannister Merwin
- Written by: Arthur Wing Pinero (play); Bannister Merwin
- Produced by: G.B. Samuelson
- Starring: Tom Reynolds; Maudie Dunham; Ethel Warwick; Roy Royston
- Production company: G.B. Samuelson Productions
- Distributed by: General Film Distributors
- Release date: May 1921
- Running time: 5,400 feet
- Country: United Kingdom
- Languages: Silent; English intertitles

The Magistrate is a 1921 British silent comedy film directed by Bannister Merwin and starring Tom Reynolds, Maudie Dunham and Ethel Warwick. It is based on the 1885 play The Magistrate by Arthur Wing Pinero. The film revolves around a widow that marries a magistrate.

== Cast ==
- Tom Reynolds as Poskett
- Maudie Dunham as Beattie Tomlinson
- Ethel Warwick as Agatha Poskett
- Roy Royston as Cis Farringdon
- Cyril Percival as Captain Horace Vail
- Dawson Milward as Colonel Lukyn
- Nell Graham as Charlotte Poskett

== Bibliography ==
- Low, Rachael. History of the British Film, 1918-1929. George Allen & Unwin, 1971.
