= The Lament for Icarus =

Painting by Herbert James Draper

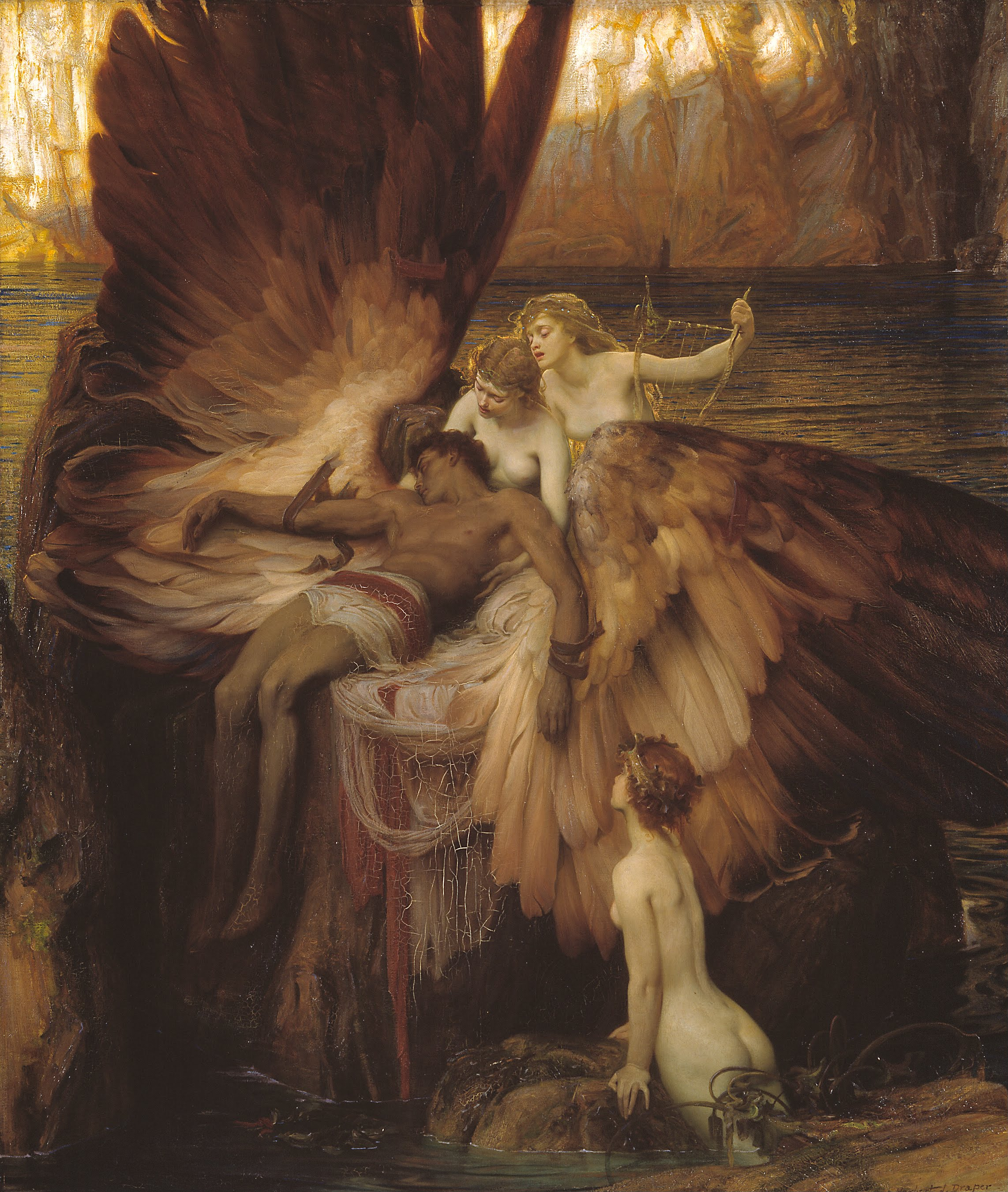
- Artist: Herbert James Draper
- Year: 1898
- Medium: Oil on canvas
- Dimensions: 180 cm × 150 cm (72 in × 61 in)
- Location: Tate Britain, London

The Lament for Icarus is a painting by Herbert James Draper, showing the dead Icarus, surrounded by lamenting nymphs. The wings of Icarus are based on the bird-of-paradise pattern. In 1898, the painting was bought from the Royal Academy exhibition through the Chantrey Bequest, a public fund for purchasing modern art bequeathed by Sir Francis Leggatt Chantrey, R.A. The Lament for Icarus was subsequently awarded the gold medal at the Exposition Universelle of 1900 in Paris.

According to Justine Hopkins, Draper identifies Icarus "with the other heroes of the Pre-Raphaelites and symbolists, who, like James Dean half a century later, manage to live fast, die young and leave a beautiful corpse". (The last half of that comment is based on a line in the 1947 novel Knock on Any Door by Willard Motley and its film adaptation.)

== The composition ==
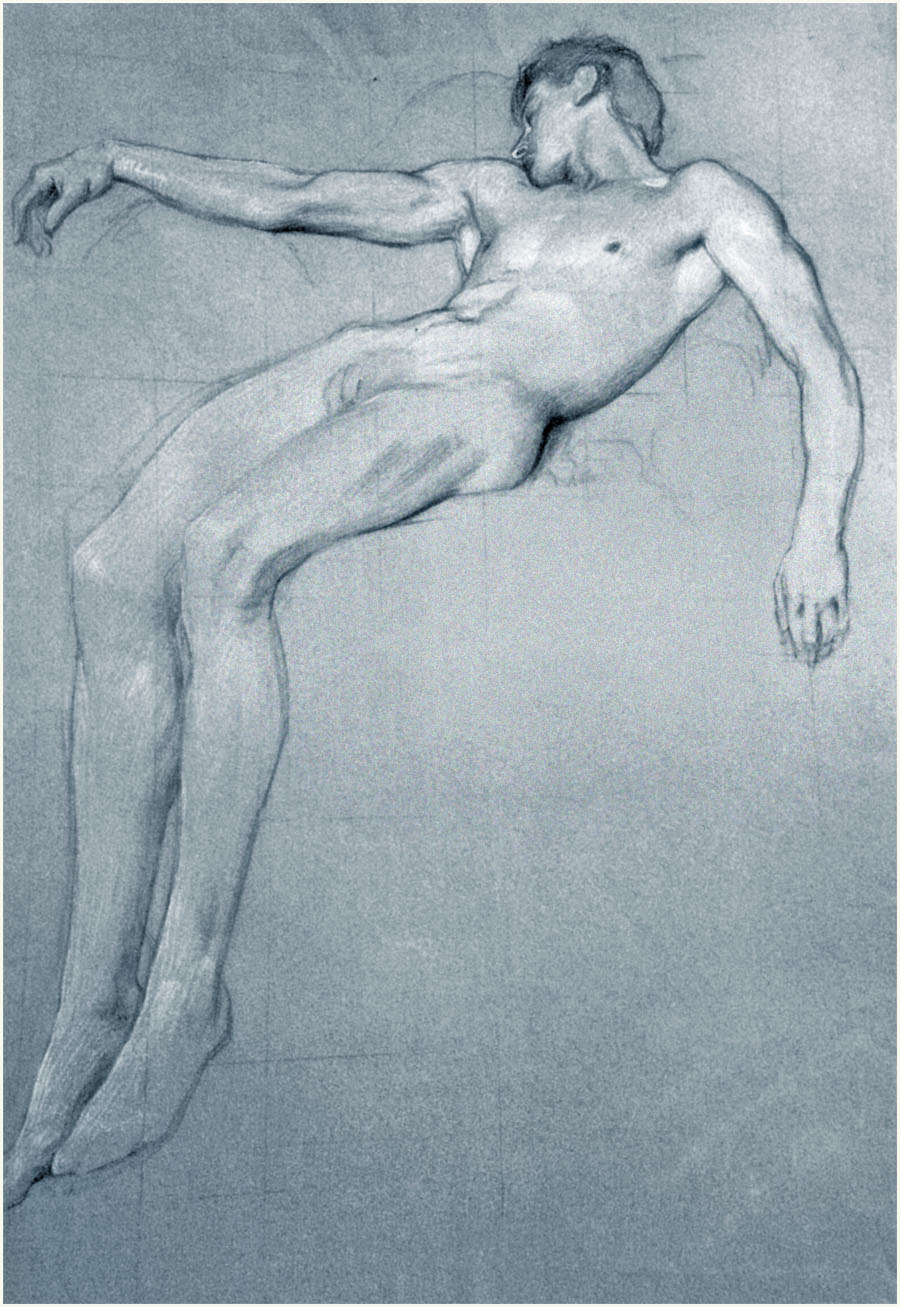
Draper's preparatory sketch for Icarus

In 1890s Draper was focused mainly on ancient Greek mythological subjects. Frederic Leighton had depicted Icarus in 1869, but while Leighton showed the preparations for the flight, Draper depicted the tragic ending of the flight. For the composition Draper adopted Leighton's method of depicting separate figures, for which he employed four young professional models (Ethel Gurden, Ethel Warwick, Florence Bird and Luigi di Luca).

The use of the male body as a vehicle for the projection of subjective emotion, as in The Lament for Icarus, is a feature of late-Victorian painting and sculpture, and in The Lament for Icarus the body appears to melt within the arms of one nymph. Draper applied liquid light effects without abandoning form and used mainly warm colours. The tanned skin of Icarus refers to his close approach to the Sun before falling down. The rays of the setting sun on distant cliffs emphasize the transience of time. Moralizing, sentimental, and sensual, The Lament for Icarus ultimately became a well-composed image of epic failure. However, somewhat surprising, Icarus has his wings fully intact, contrary to the myth where the wax melted and Icarus fell flapping his bare arms. The image of a "winged creature" is likely utilized to create a more symbolic, romantic, and elegant appearance.
