= Ulysses and the Sirens (Draper) =

Painting by Herbert James Draper

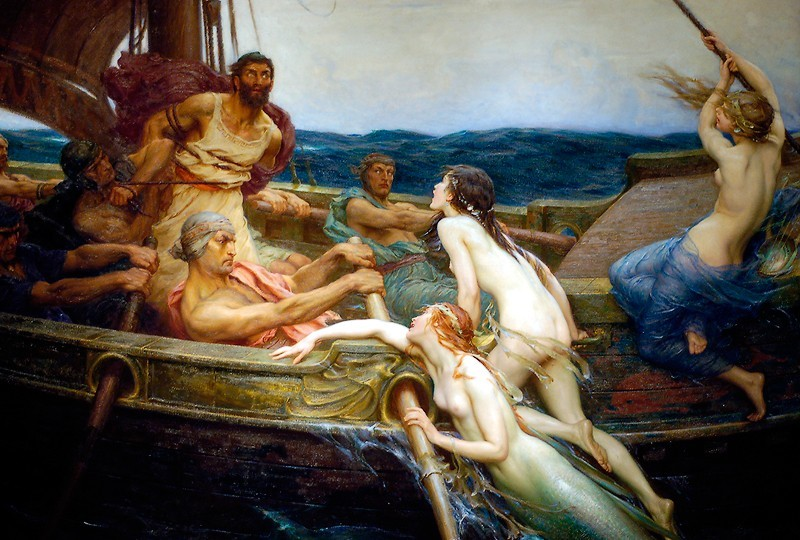
- Artist: Herbert James Draper
- Year: 1909
- Medium: Oil on canvas
- Subject: A scene from Homer's Odyssey in which Ulysses is tormented by Sirens
- Dimensions: 175.9 cm × 210 cm (69.25 in × 84 in)
- Location: Ferens Art Gallery, Kingston upon Hull
- Website: www.hullcc.gov.uk

Ulysses and the Sirens is a 1909 oil painting by Herbert James Draper measuring 69.25 in × 84 in (175.9 cm × 213.4 cm). It is now in the Ferens Art Gallery in Kingston upon Hull, England. The gallery bought the painting from Draper in 1910 for £600. Draper also painted a reduced replica that is now in the Leeds Art Gallery.

The subject of the painting is an episode in the epic poem Odyssey by Homer in which Ulysses is tormented by the voices of Sirens, although there are only two Sirens in Homer's poem and they stay in a meadow. The painting depicts Ulysses tied to the mast and forcibly attendant to the Sirens' seductions.

Although the Sirens were depicted in ancient Greek art as scary, ugly creatures, Draper maintains the spirit but not the content of the story by transferring the Sirens' seductiveness from their song to a visible form, depicting the Sirens as beautiful mermaids who invade Ulysses' ship. The Sirens are nude or nearly so and their tails disappear as they board the ship. Draper's conflation of Sirens with mermaids and his sexualization of these figures are consistent with other artwork of the Victorian and Edwardian eras. Norwegian social theorist Jon Elster used the name of Draper's painting as the title for his 1979 book about rationality and precommitment.

== Bibliography ==
- Baker, Elton T.E.; Christensen, Joel (2013). Homer: A Beginner's Guide. Oneworld Publications. ISBN 9781780742298.
- Halvorsen, Vidar (2014). Scherdin, Lill (ed.). "Criminal Justice, Sustainability and the Death Penalty". Capital Punishment: A Hazard to a Sustainable Criminal Justice System?. Ashgate Publishing: 273–292. ISBN 9781409457190.
- Impelluso, Lucia; Zuffi, Stefano (2003). Gods and Heroes in Art. Getty Publications. ISBN 9780892367023.
- Menges, Jeff A. (2009). 120 Great Victorian Fantasy Paintings. Dover Publications. ISBN 9780486990040.
- Robertson, Alexander; Miller, Connie; Raikes, Sophie (2007). Leeds Art Gallery. Leeds Museums & Galleries. ISBN 9780901981752.
- Robinson, Leonard (2007). William Etty: The Life and Art. McFarland & Company. ISBN 9780786425310.
- Sax, Boria (2013). Imaginary Animals: The Monstrous, the Wondrous and the Human. Reaktion Books. ISBN 9781780232133.
- Scott, Derek B. (2006). Blackwell, Alan; MacKay, David (eds.). "The Power of Music". Power. Cambridge University Press: 94–113. doi:10.1017/CBO9780511541407.007. ISBN 9781139445597.
