= Herbert James Draper =

British painter (1863-1920)

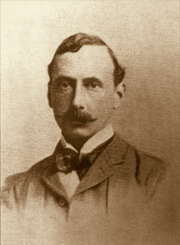
- Born: Herbert James Draper; 26 November 1863; London, England
- Died: 22 September 1920 (aged 56); London, England
- Education: St John's Wood Art School
- Known for: Painting
- Notable work: The Lament for Icarus, 1898; Ulysses and the Sirens, 1909
- Movement: Classicism
- Awards: Gold Medal, 1890; Travelling Scholarship, 1890

Herbert James Draper (26 November 1863 – 22 September 1920) was an English Neoclassicist painter whose career began in the Victorian era and extended through the first two decades of the 20th century.

== Life ==
Born in Covent Garden, London, the seventh child and only son of a fruit merchant named John James Draper and his wife Emma, Draper was educated at Bruce Castle School in Tottenham and then went on to study art at the Royal Academy. He undertook several educational trips to Rome and Paris between 1888 and 1892, having won the Royal Academy Gold Medal and Travelling Studentship in 1889. In the 1890s, he worked as an illustrator, eventually settling in London. In 1891, he married Ida (née Williams), with whom he had a daughter, Yvonne. He died of arteriosclerosis at the age of 56, in his home on Abbey Road.

== Career ==
Draper's most productive period began in 1894. He focused mainly on mythological themes from ancient Greece. His painting The Lament for Icarus (1898) won the gold medal at the Exposition Universelle in Paris in 1900 and was later bought for the Tate Gallery by the Chantrey Trustees. He was also responsible for the decoration of the ceiling of the Drapers' Hall in the City of London. His draftsmanship was excellent in sensuous portrayals of both male and female nudes; several of his paintings portray proud, in some cases predatory female sexuality, for example The Gates of Dawn (1899), The Water Nixie (1908), Ulysses and the Sirens (1909) and The Kelpie (1913).

In later years as the public tastes changed and mythological scenes became less popular, he concentrated more on portraits. Among his portrait subjects are the army officer Sir William Edmund Franklyn, Lucius O'Brien, 15th Baron Inchiquin, his wife and his eldest son Donough as a young boy, the physician Philip Pye-Smith (commissioned by Guy's Hospital), the actress June Tripp (twice), in addition to his wife, who may also have served as the model for his Autumn. Draper was well-known as a portrait painter. At a charity auction for the Red Cross in 1918, his offer to paint a child's portrait brought in a bid of £250, equivalent to £12,282 in 2025.

Draper took part in the annual expositions of the Royal Academy from 1890 on. He was proposed for membership in 1898, 1903, 1905 and 1920, but was passed over for election. In his last years, his popularity faded, though there has recently been a revival of interest in his work on the art market. The Royal Cornwall Museum's 2010 auction of his The Sea Maiden and Ernest Normand's Bondage to help secure its finances generated debate about the policy of disposing of art works for this purpose.

== Gallery ==
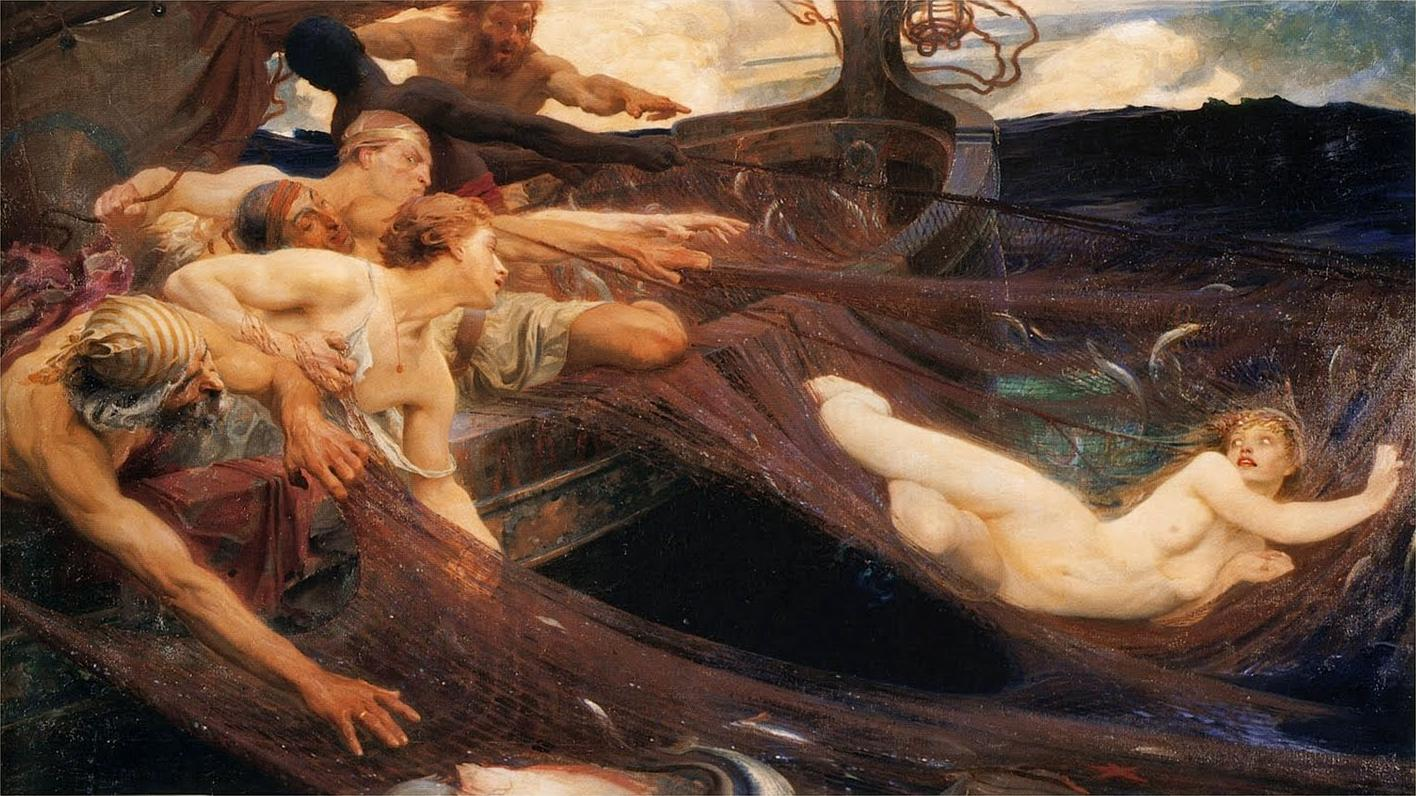
The Sea Maiden, 1894

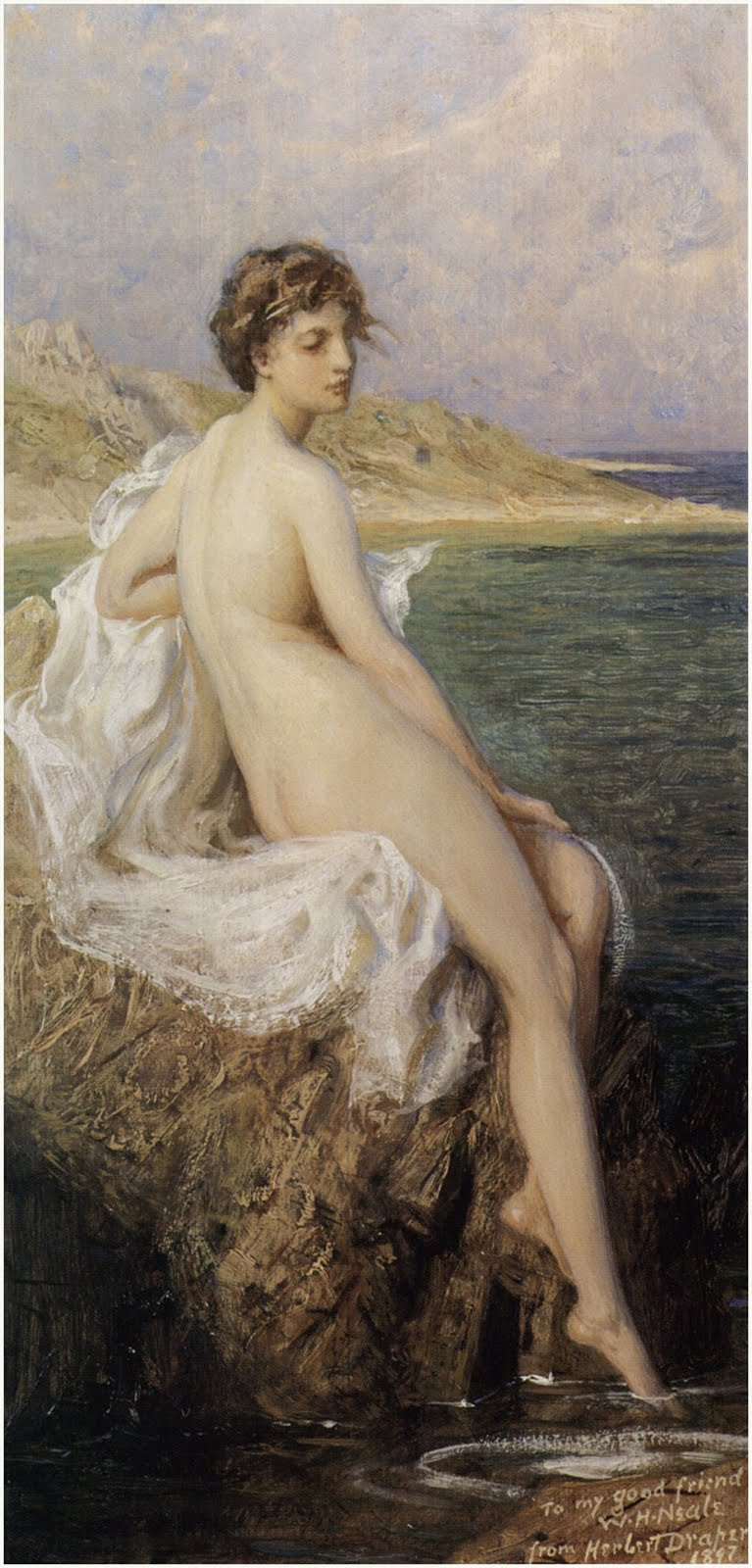
Bather, 1896

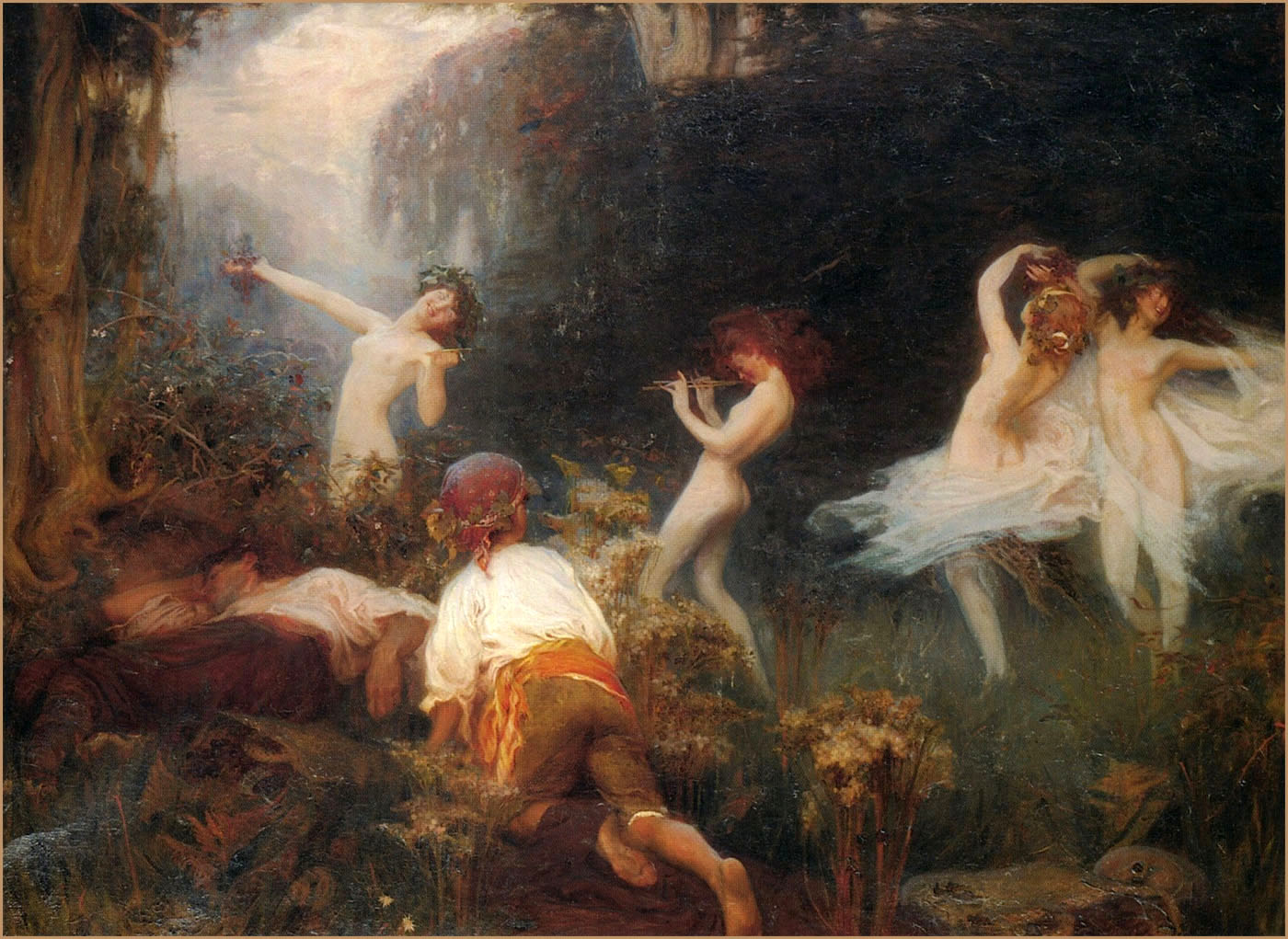
The Vintage Morn, 1896

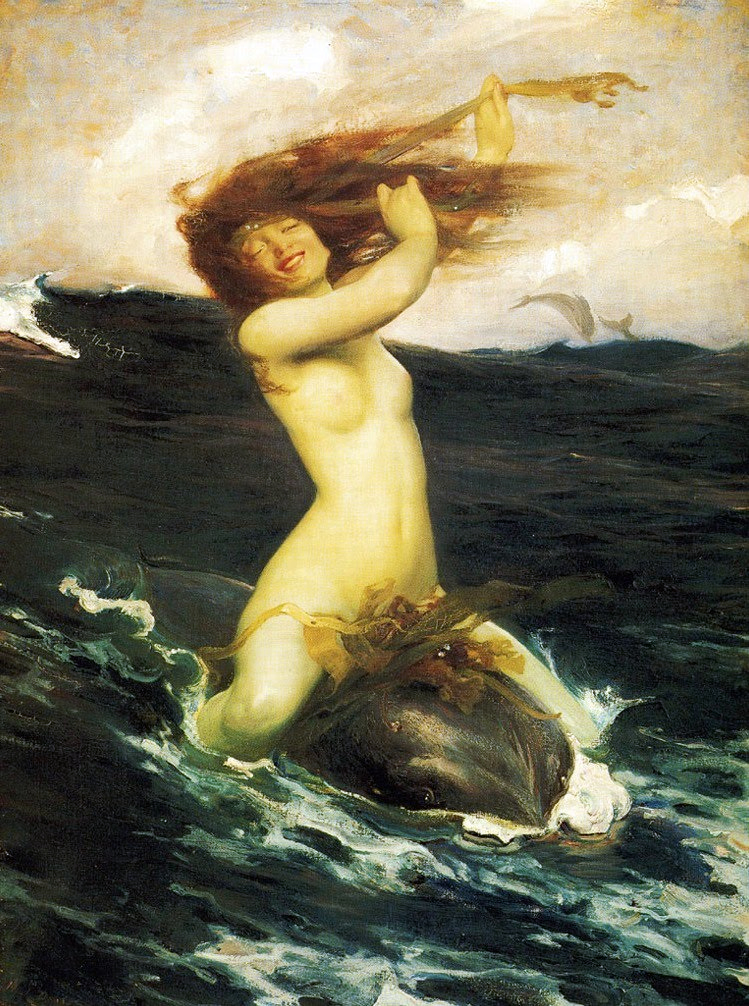
The Foam Sprite, 1896

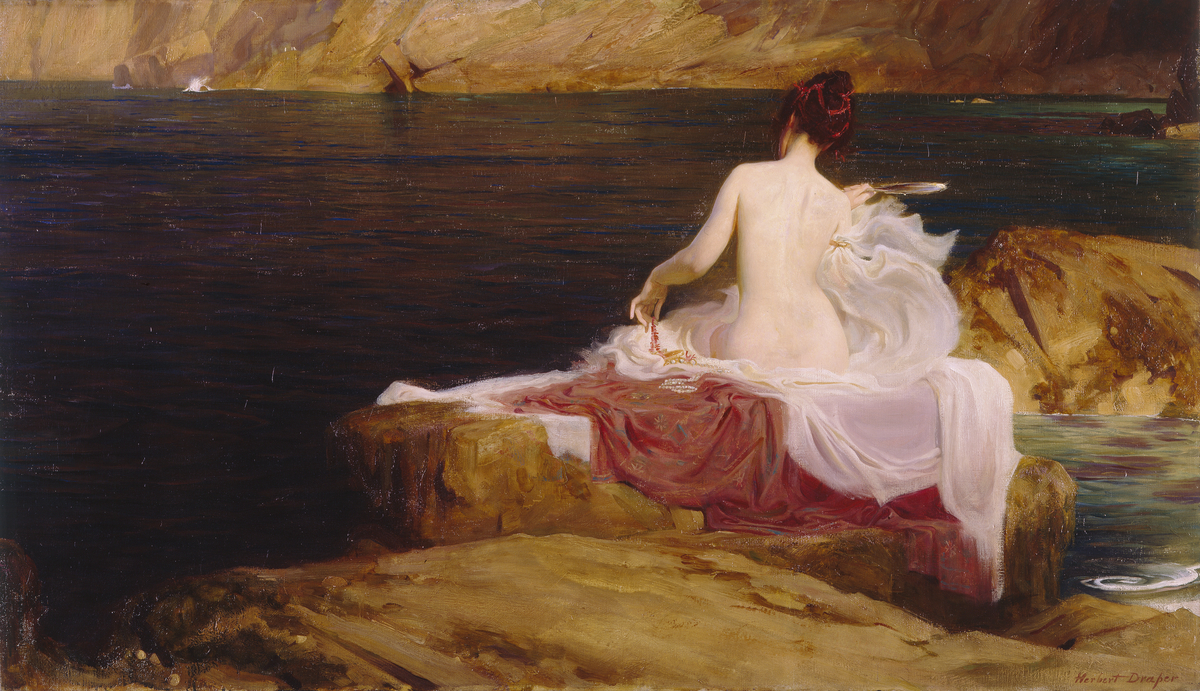
Calypso's Isle, 1897

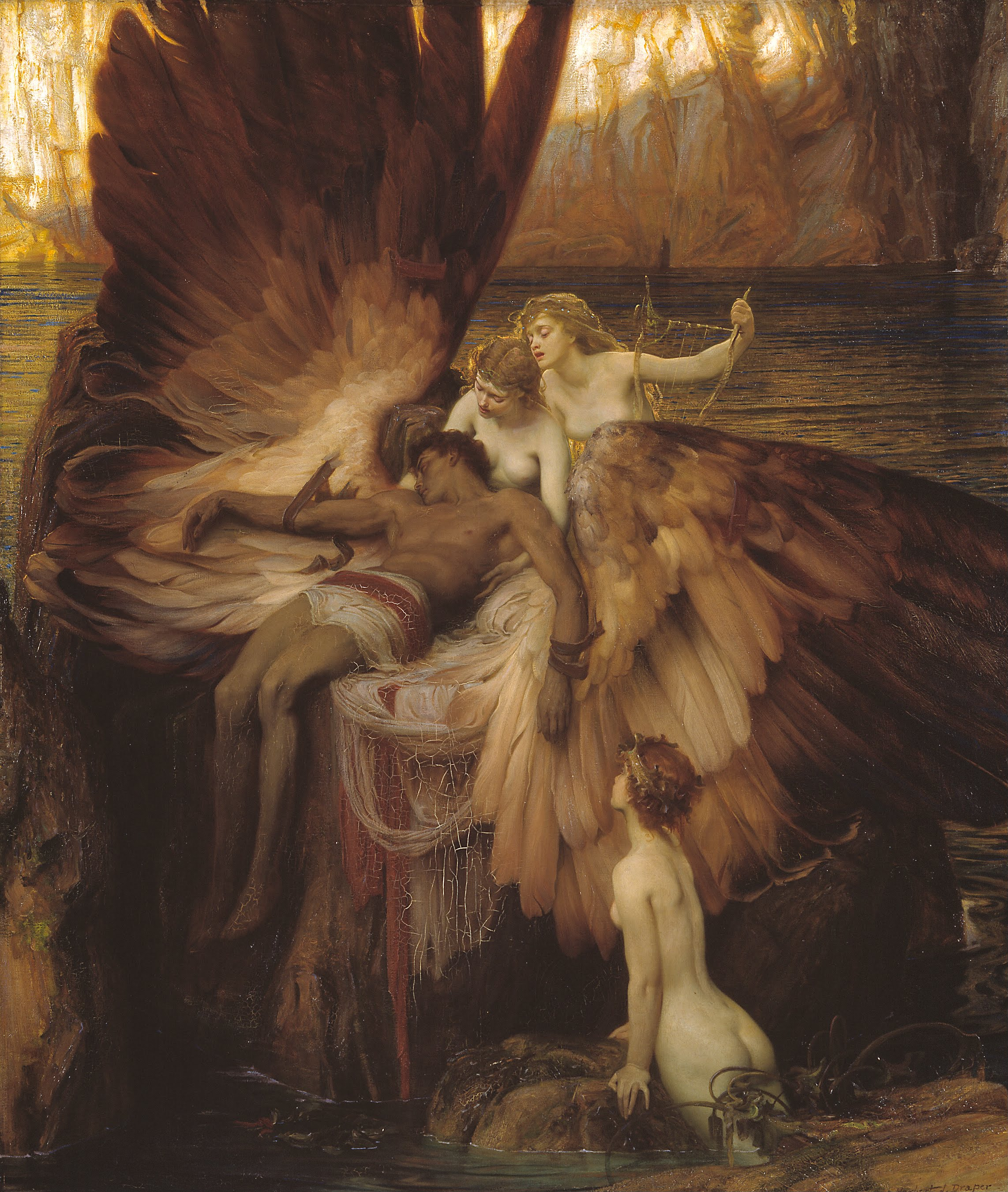
The Lament for Icarus, 1898

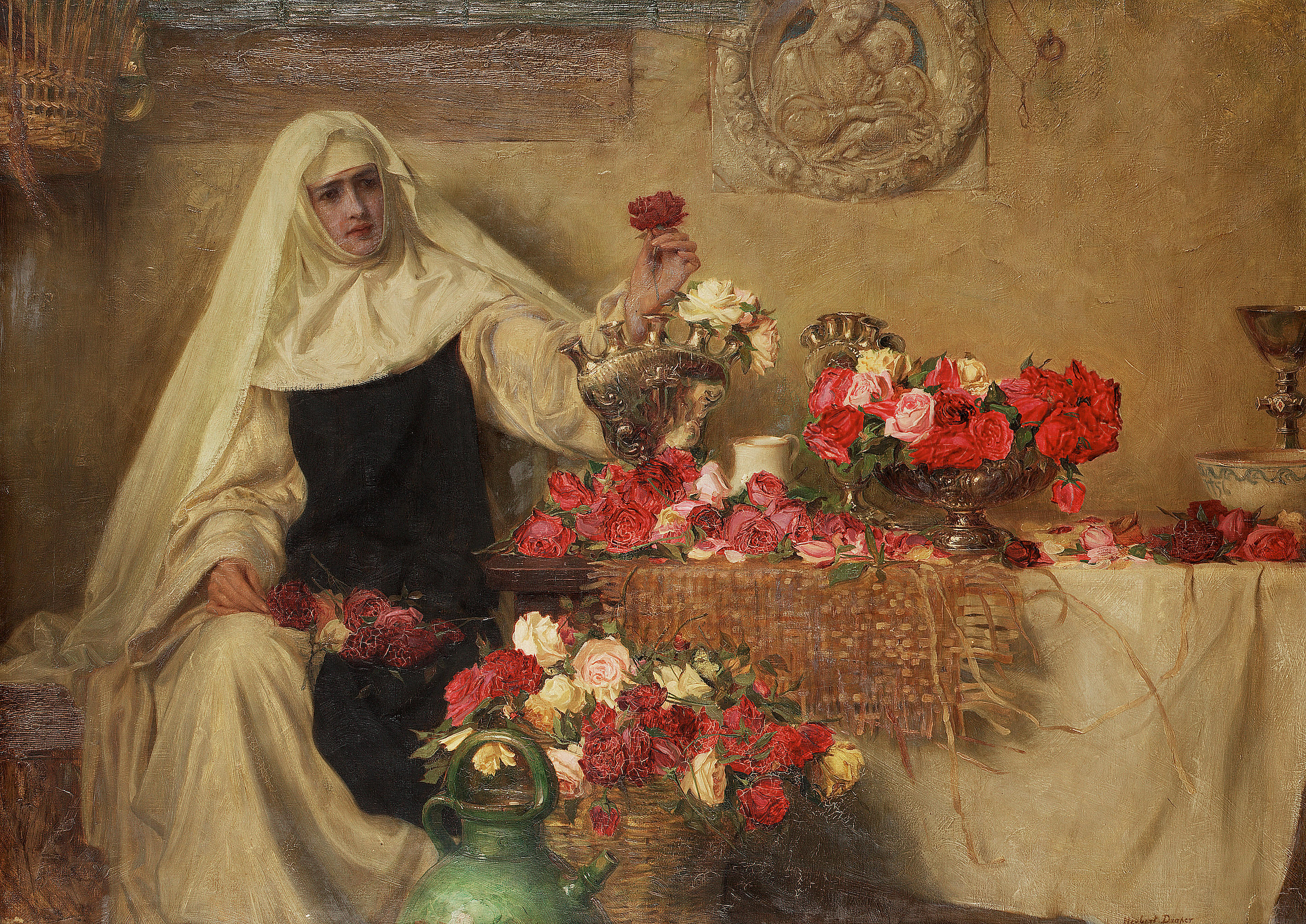
For Saint Dorothea's Day, 1899

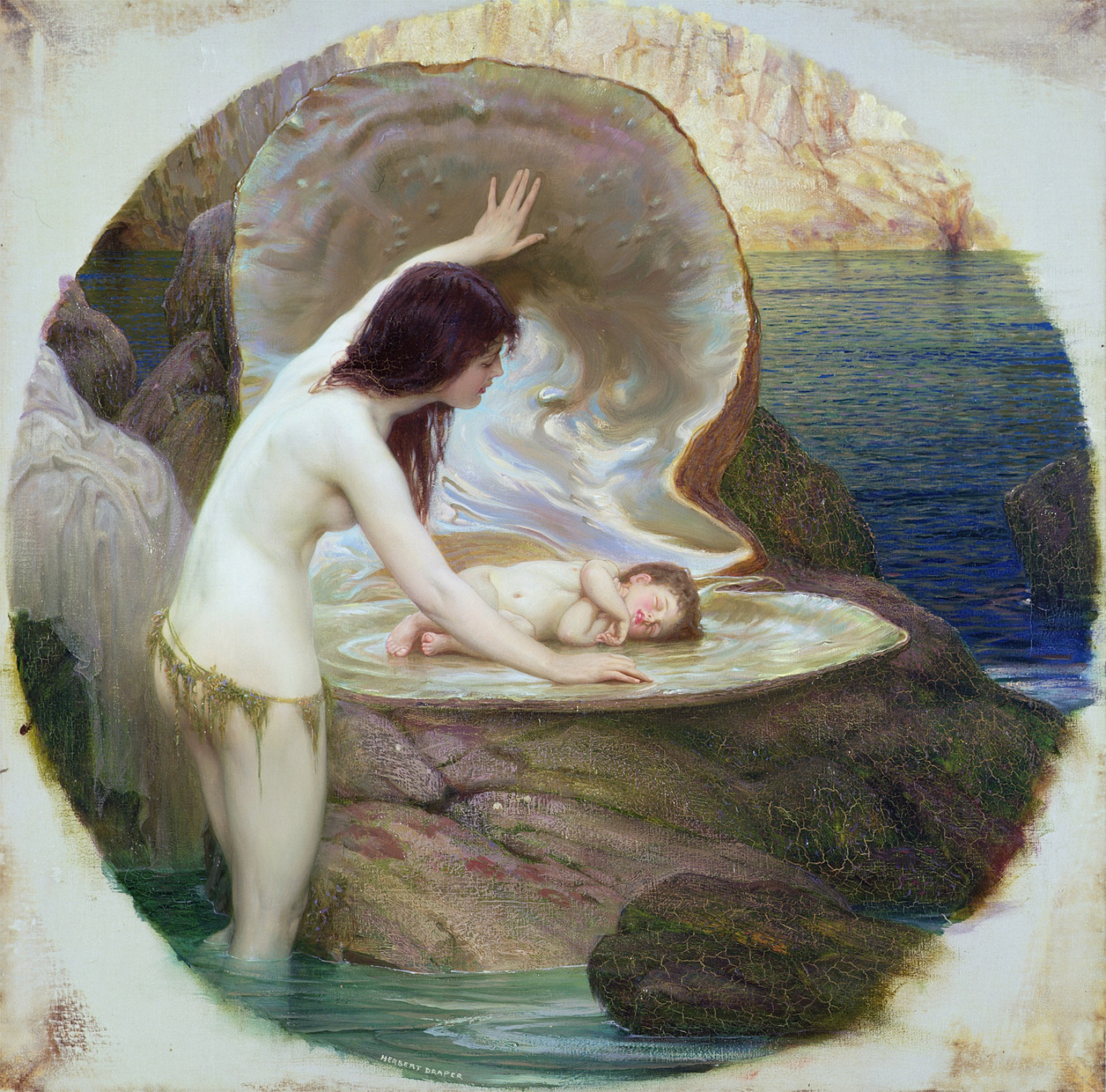
A Water Baby, c. 1900

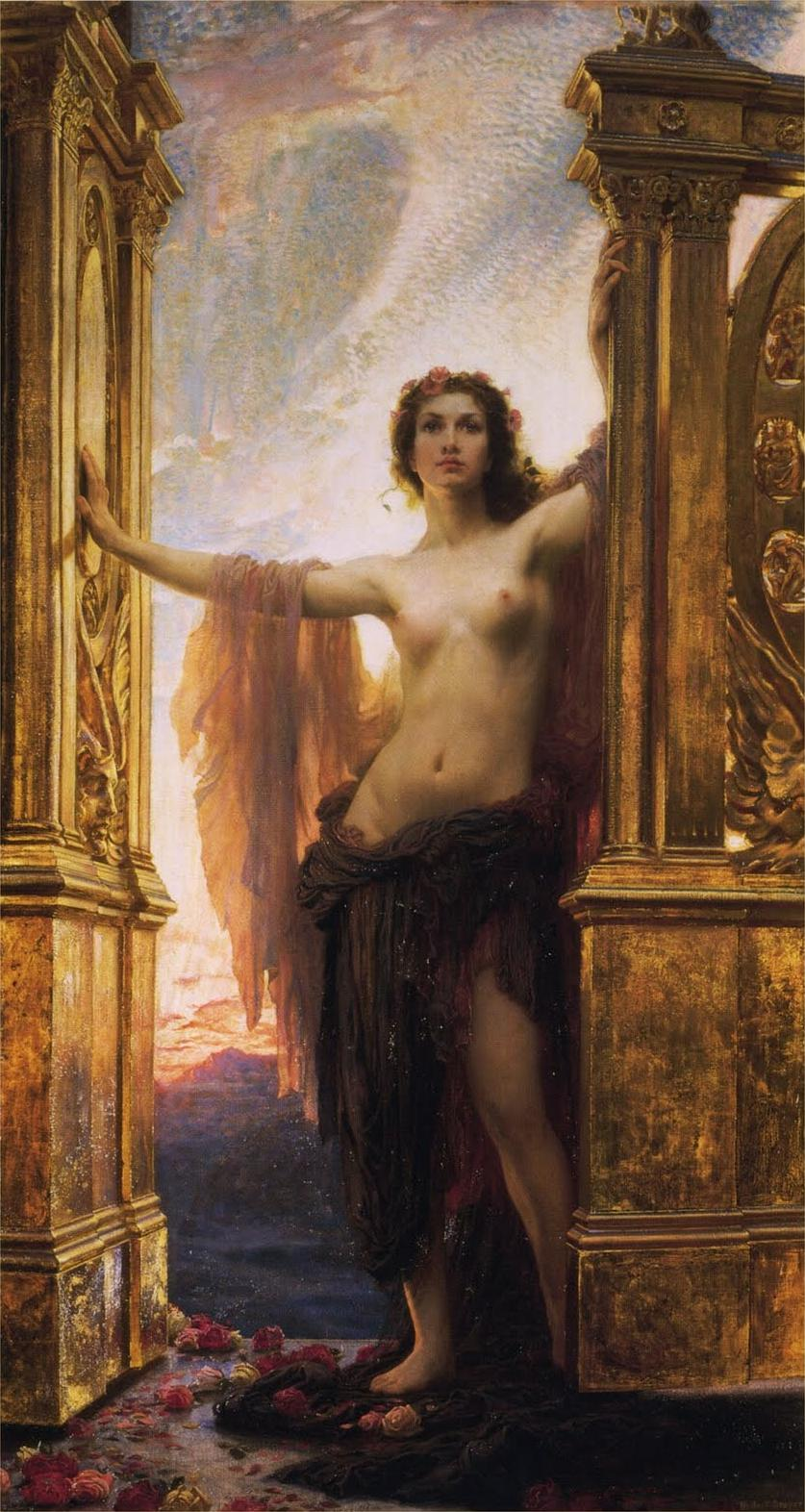
Gates of Dawn, 1900

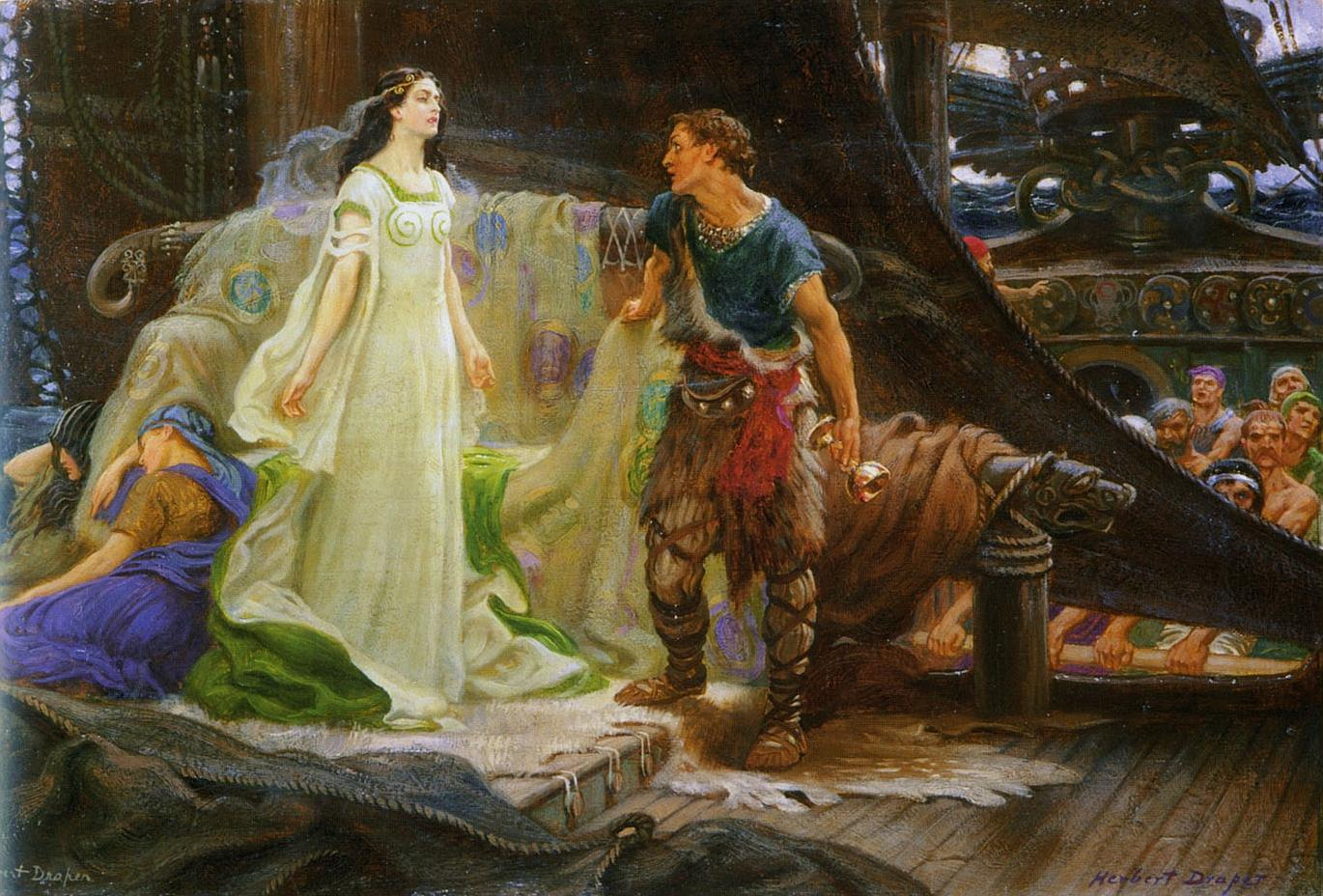
Tristan and Isolde, 1901

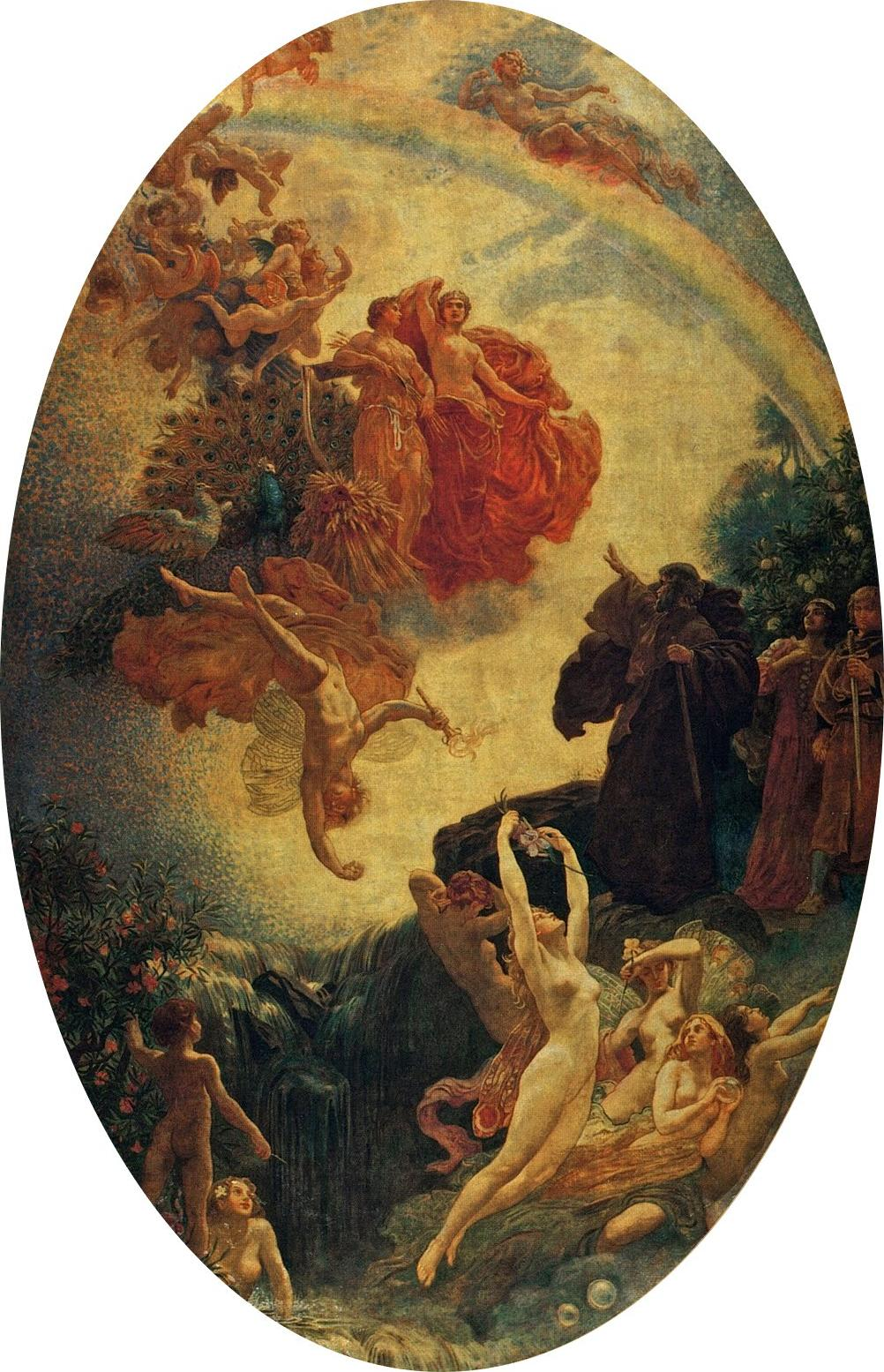
Prospero Summoning Nymphs and Deities, c. 1902

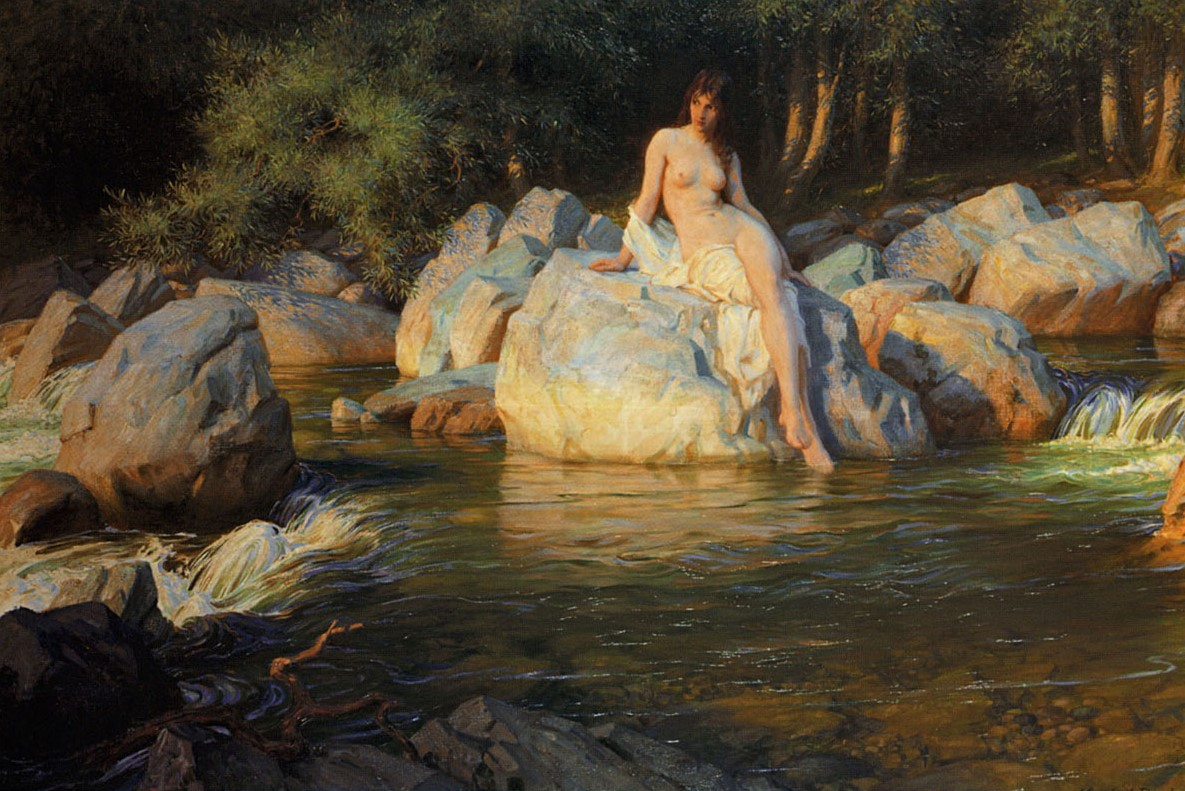
The Kelpie, 1903

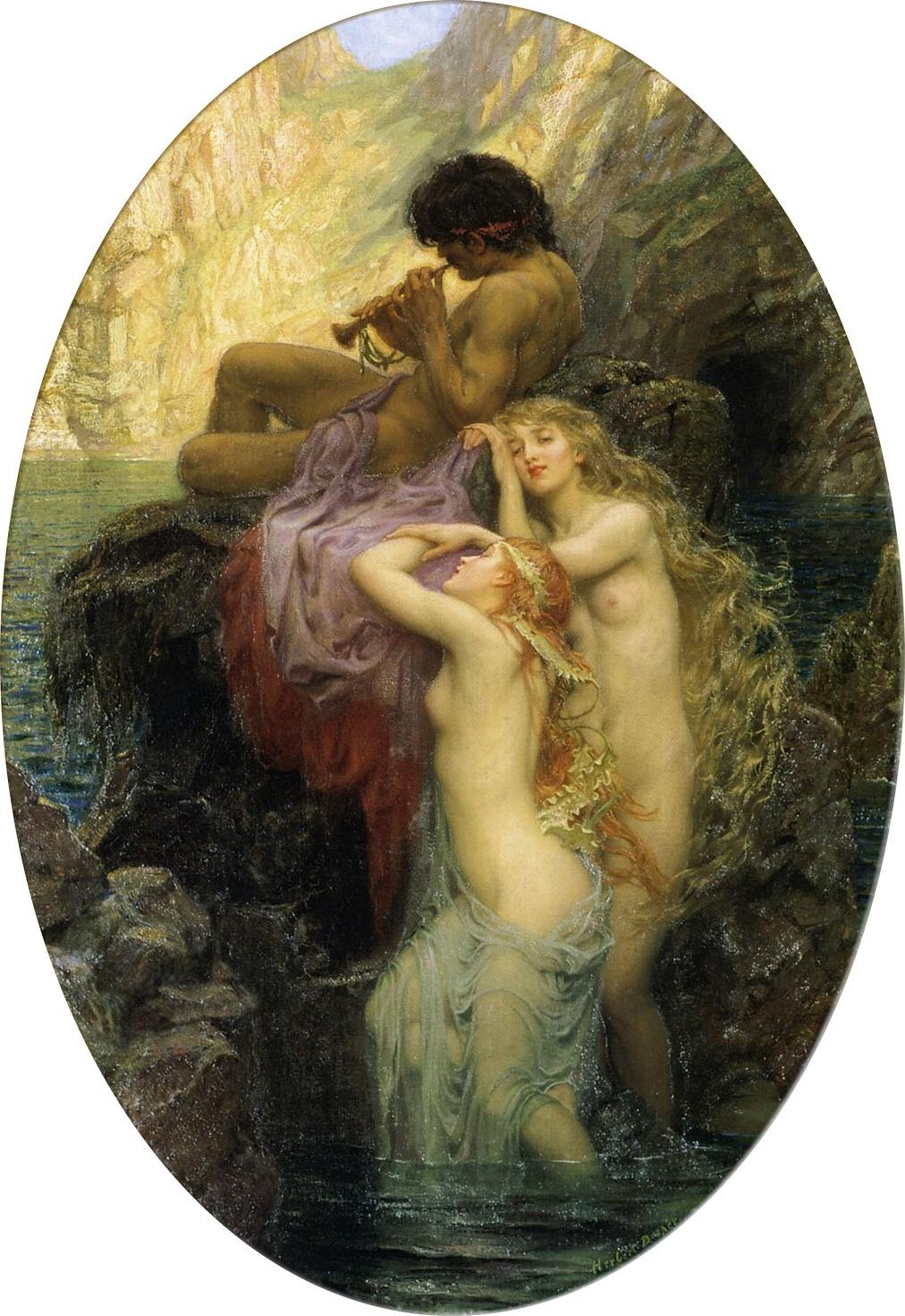
Sea Melodies, 1904

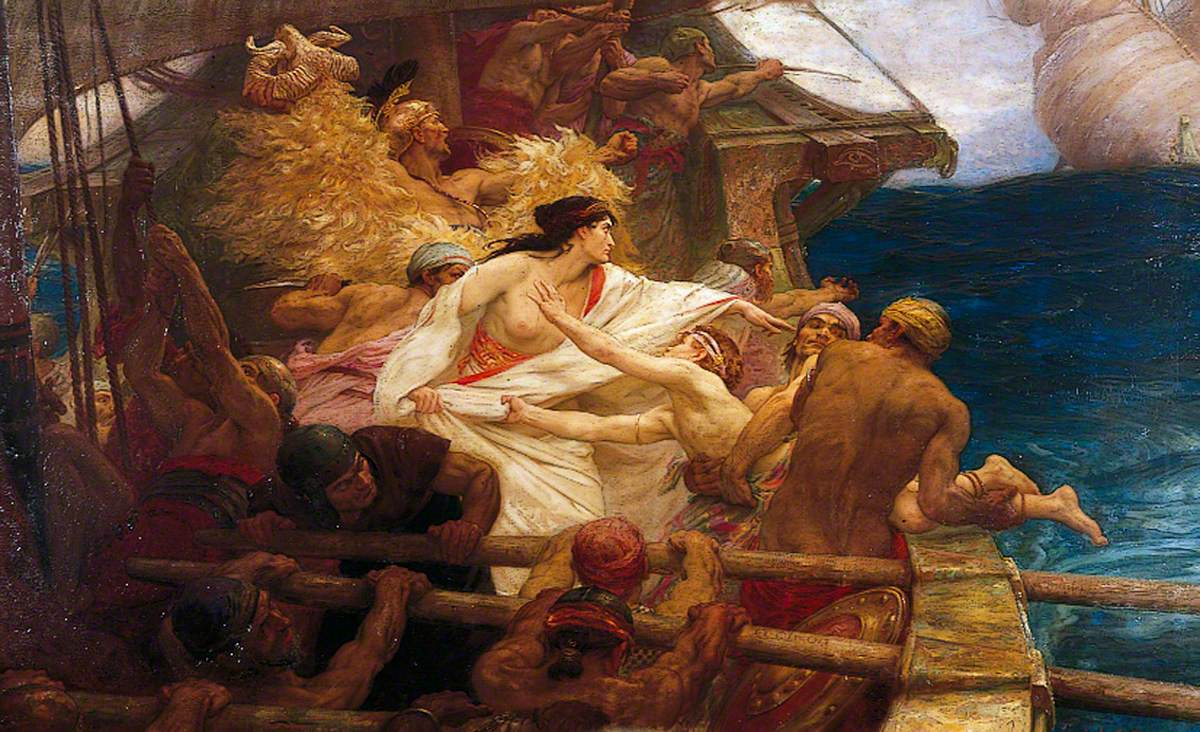
The Golden Fleece, 1904

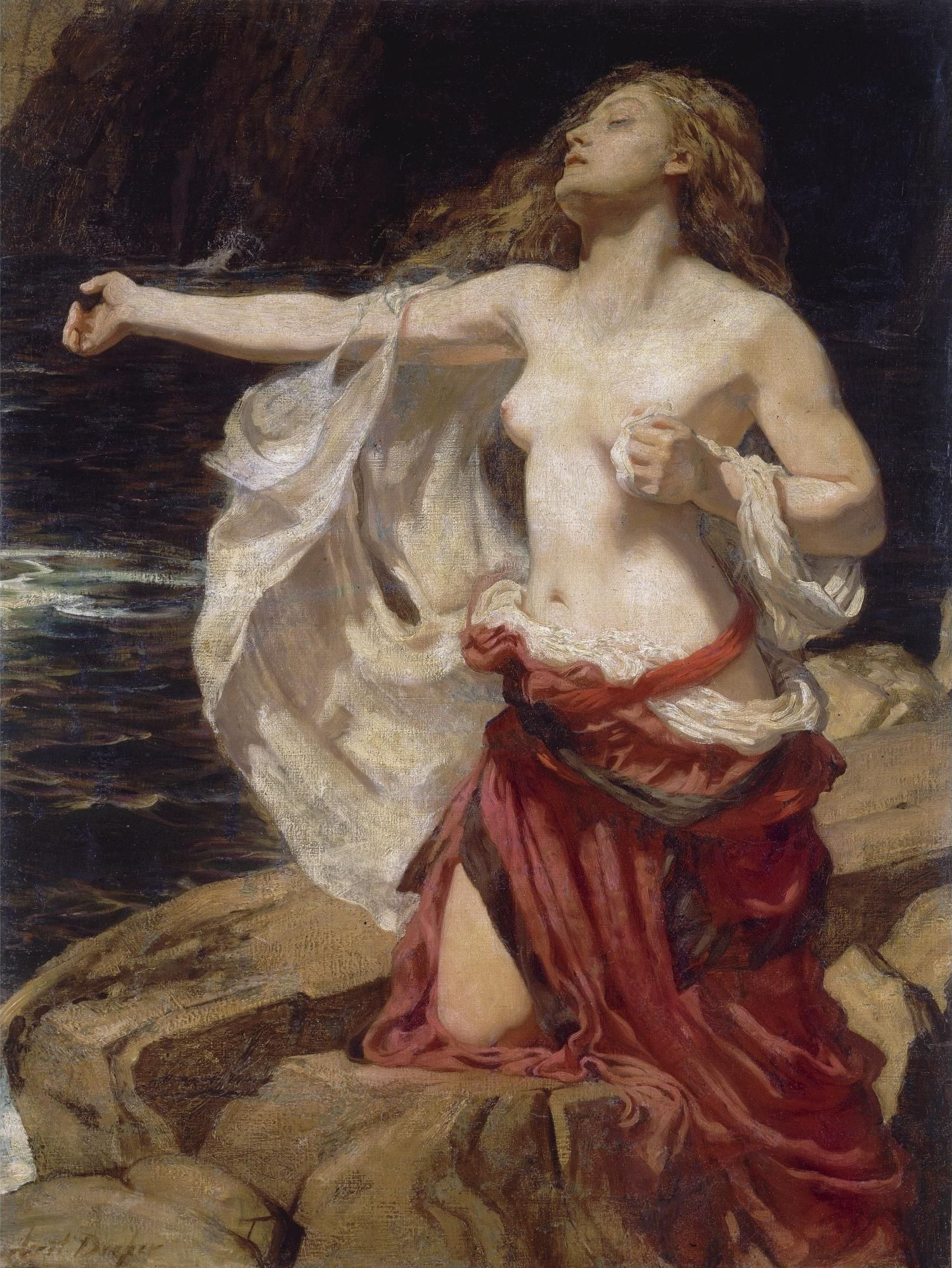
Ariadne, c. 1905

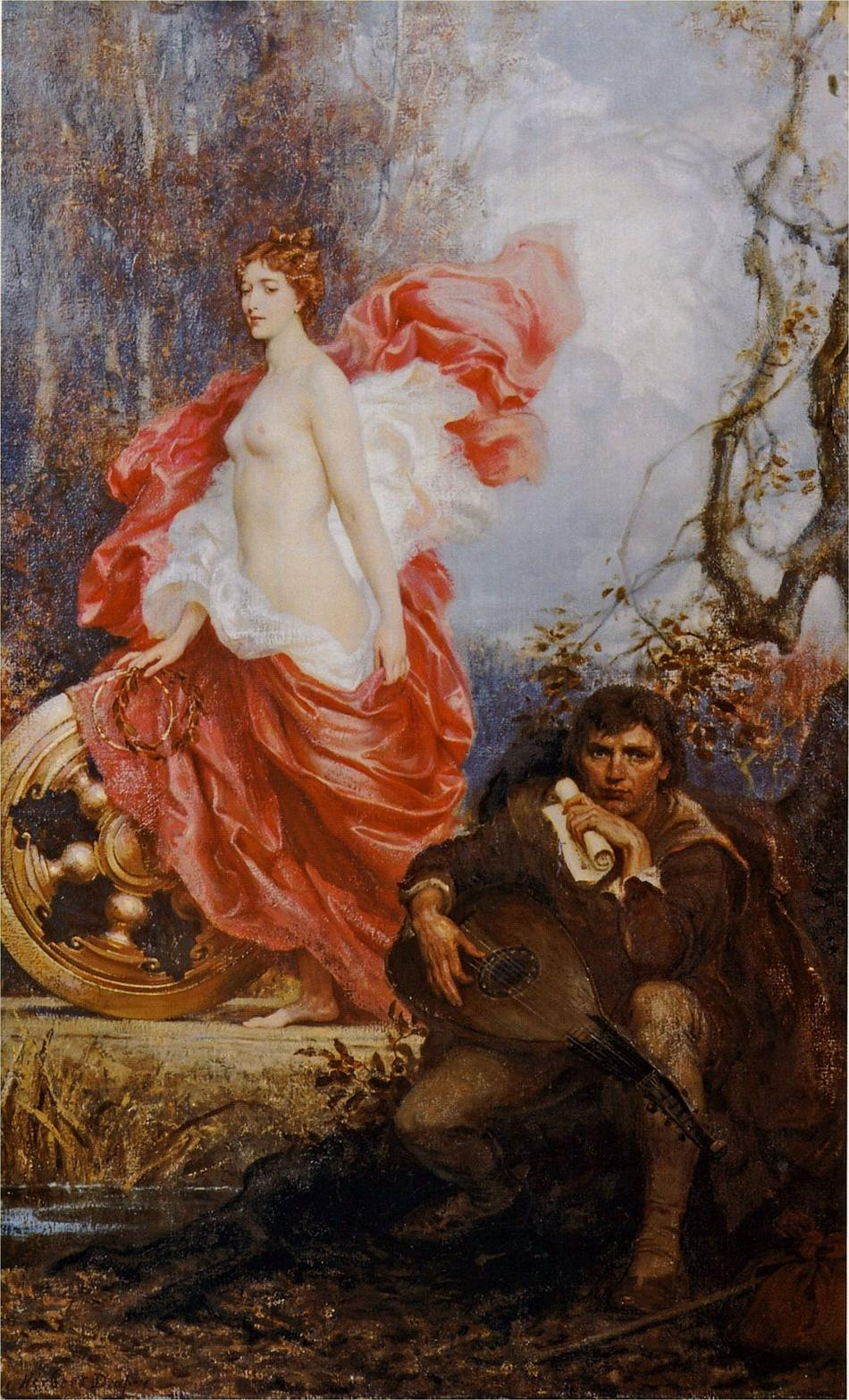
Art and the Jade, 1906

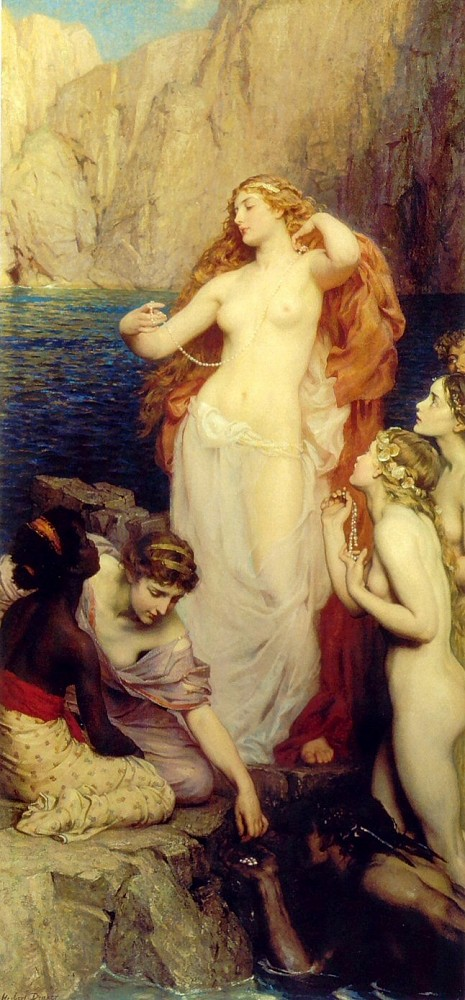
The Pearls of Aphrodite, 1907

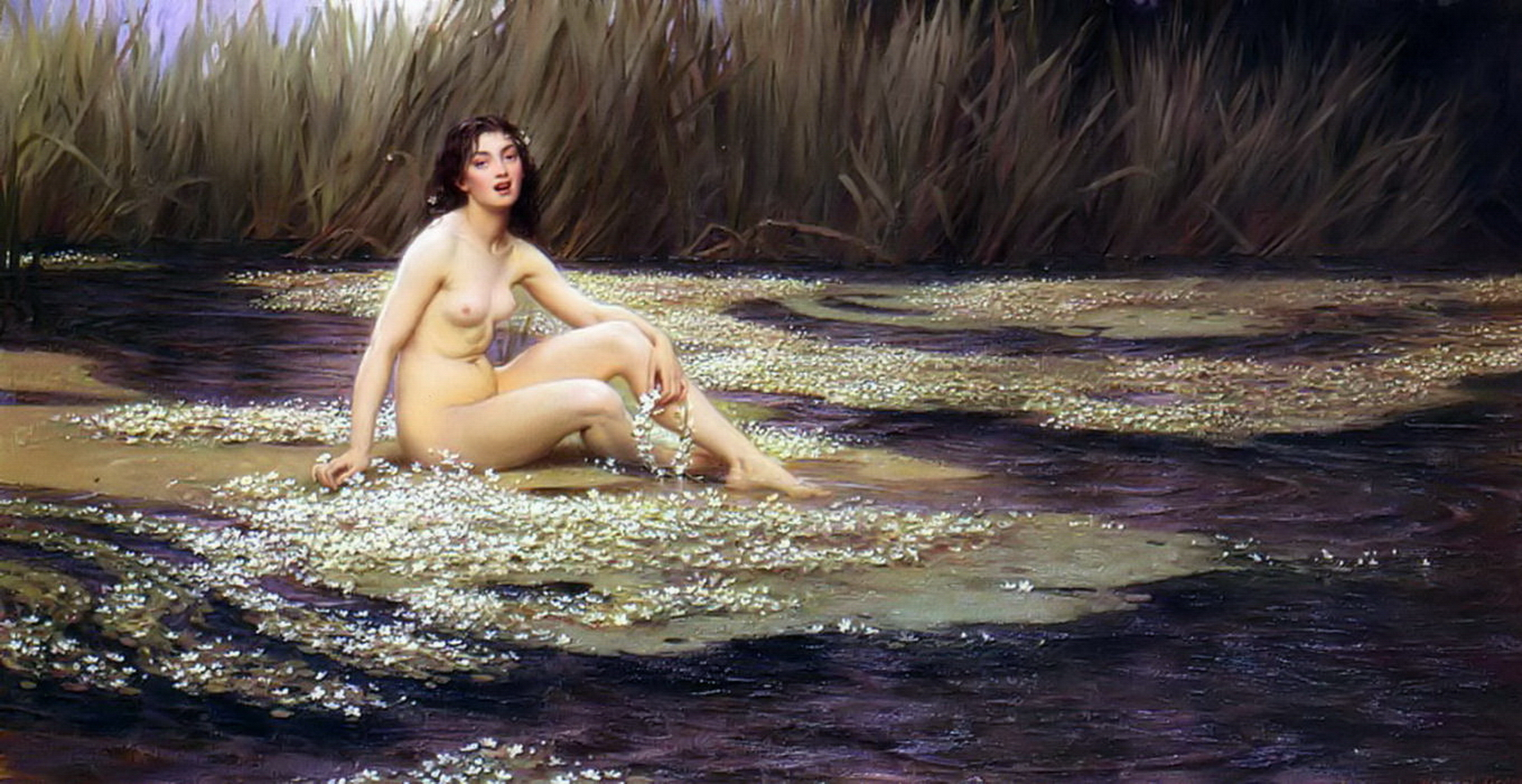
The Water Nymph, 1908

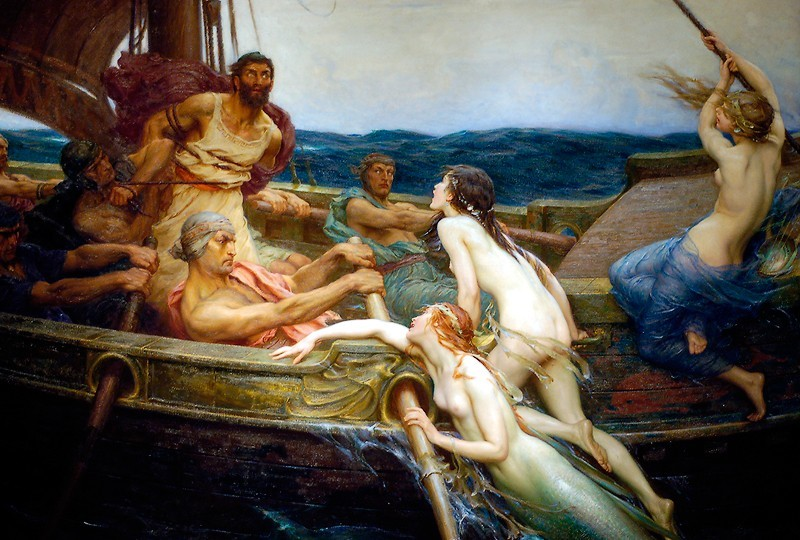
Ulysses and the Sirens, 1909

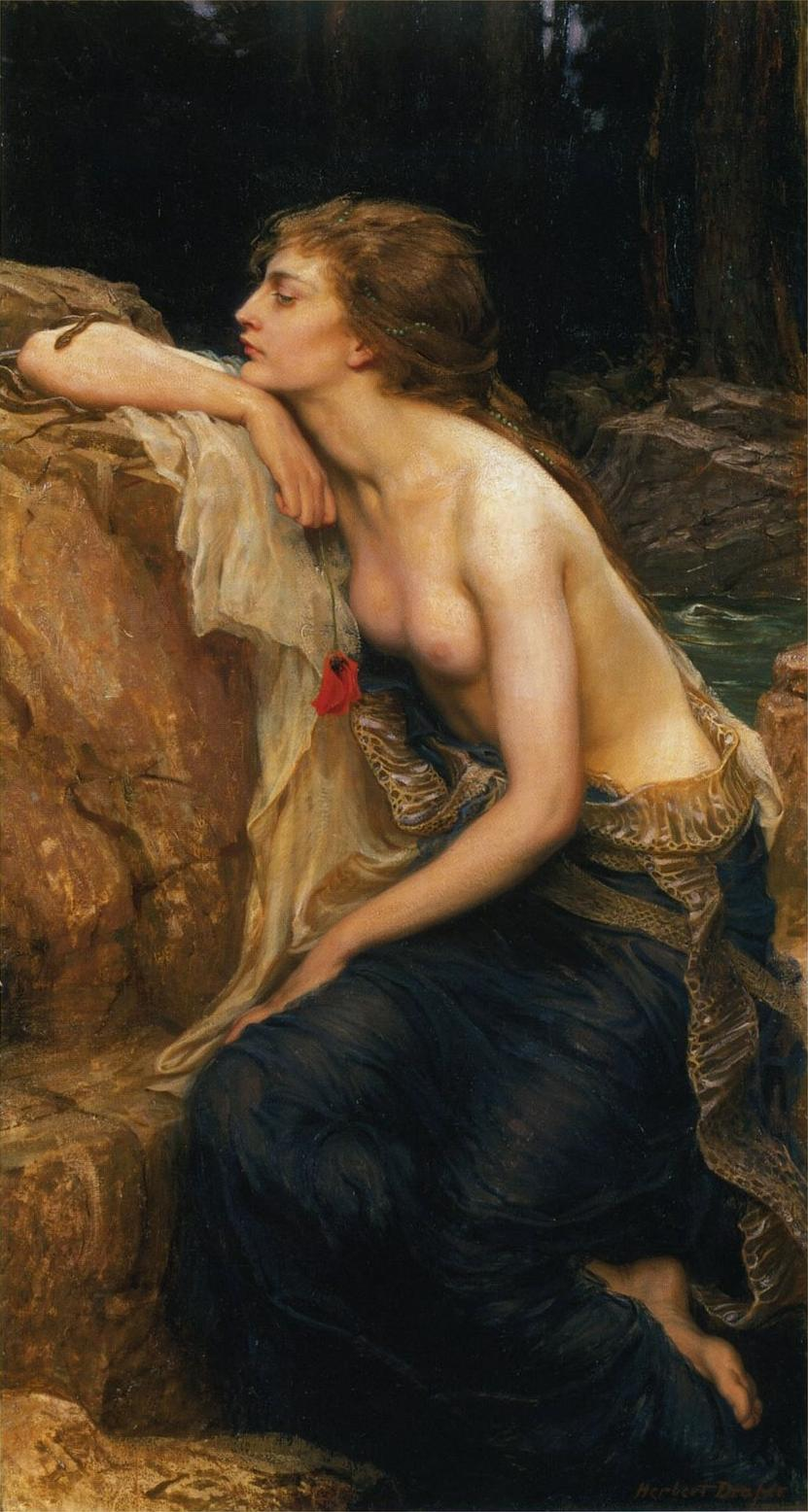
The Lamia, 1909

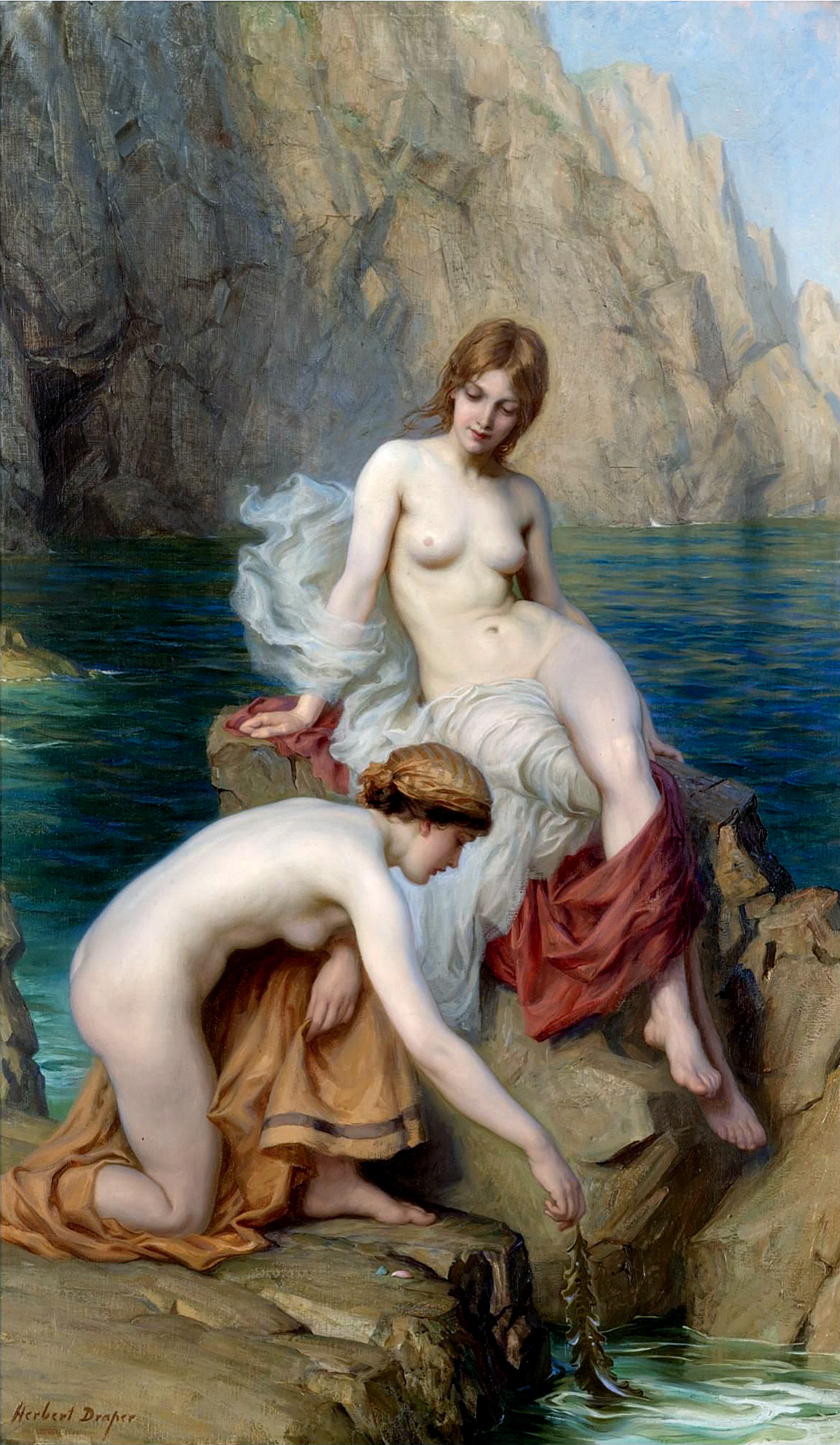
By Summer Seas, 1912

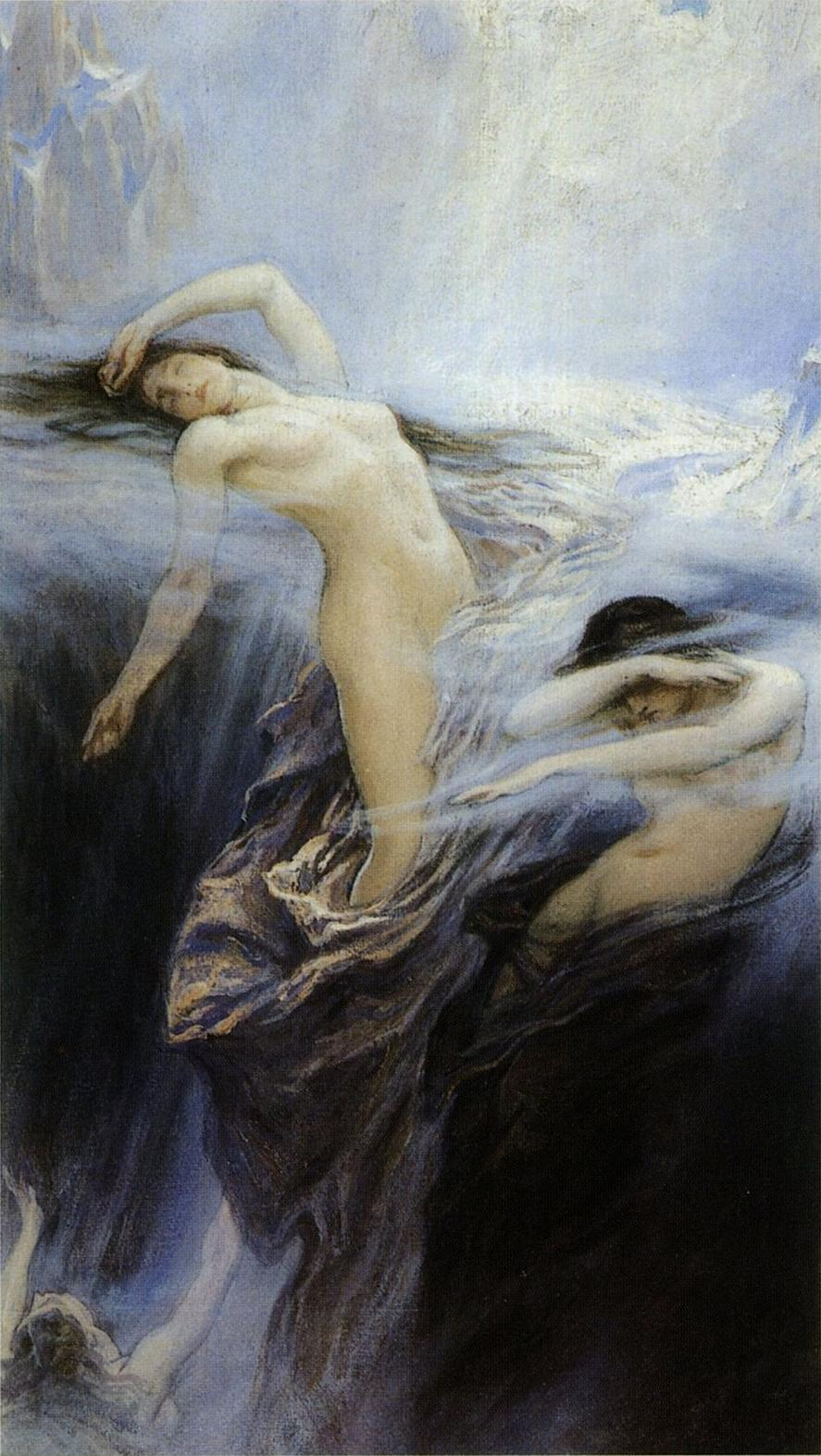
Clyties of the Mist, 1912

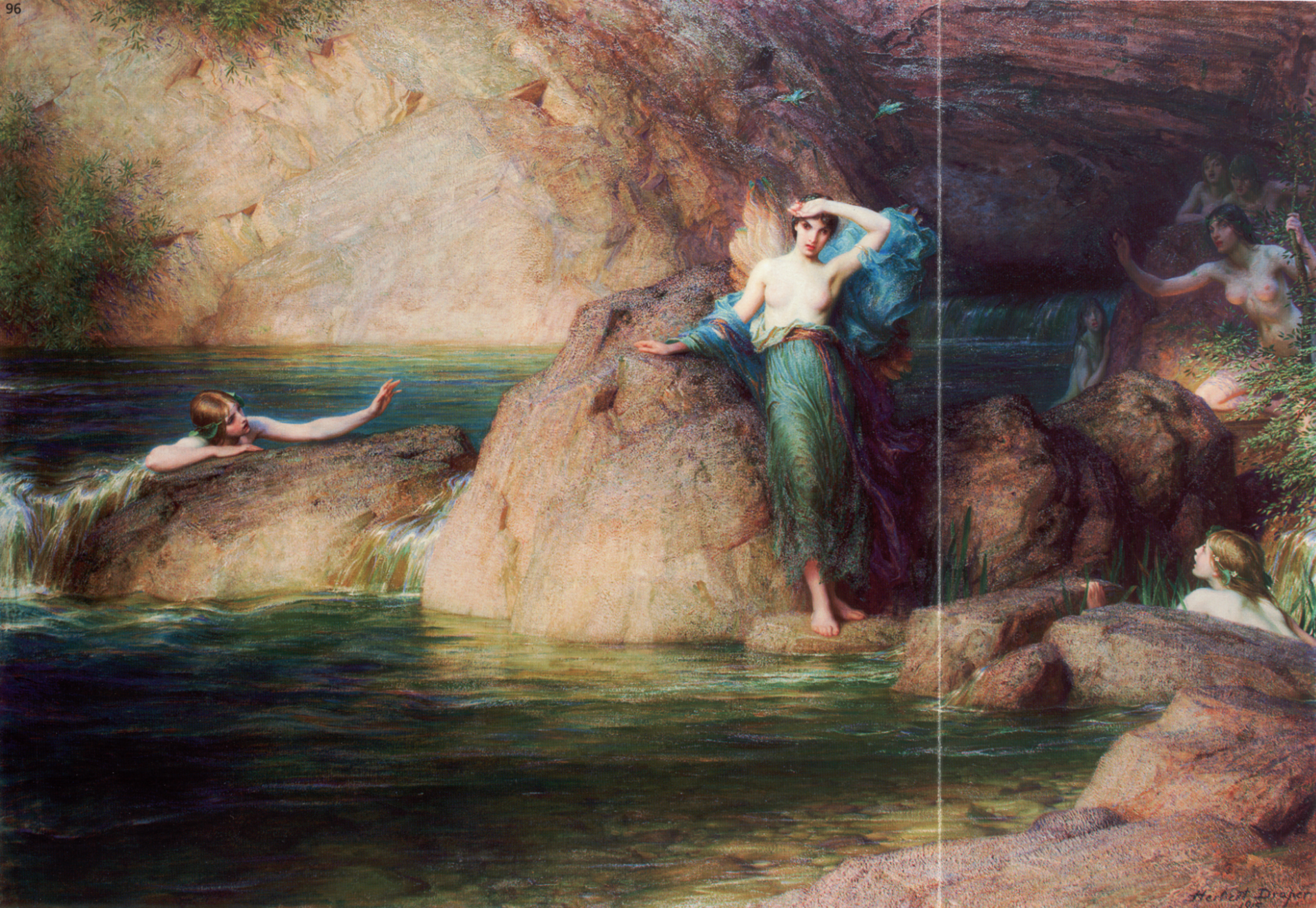
Halcyone, 1915

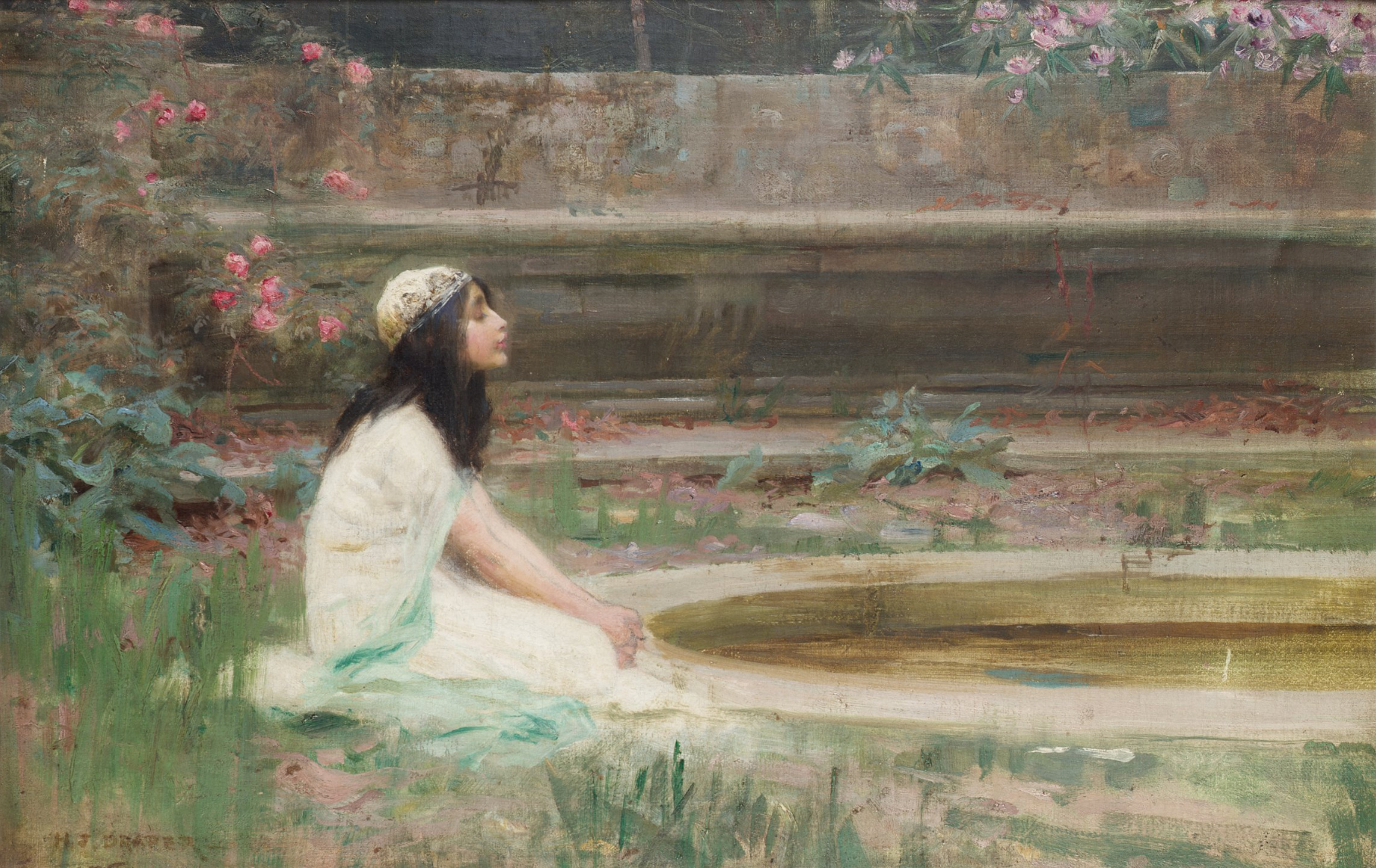
A Young Girl by a Pool

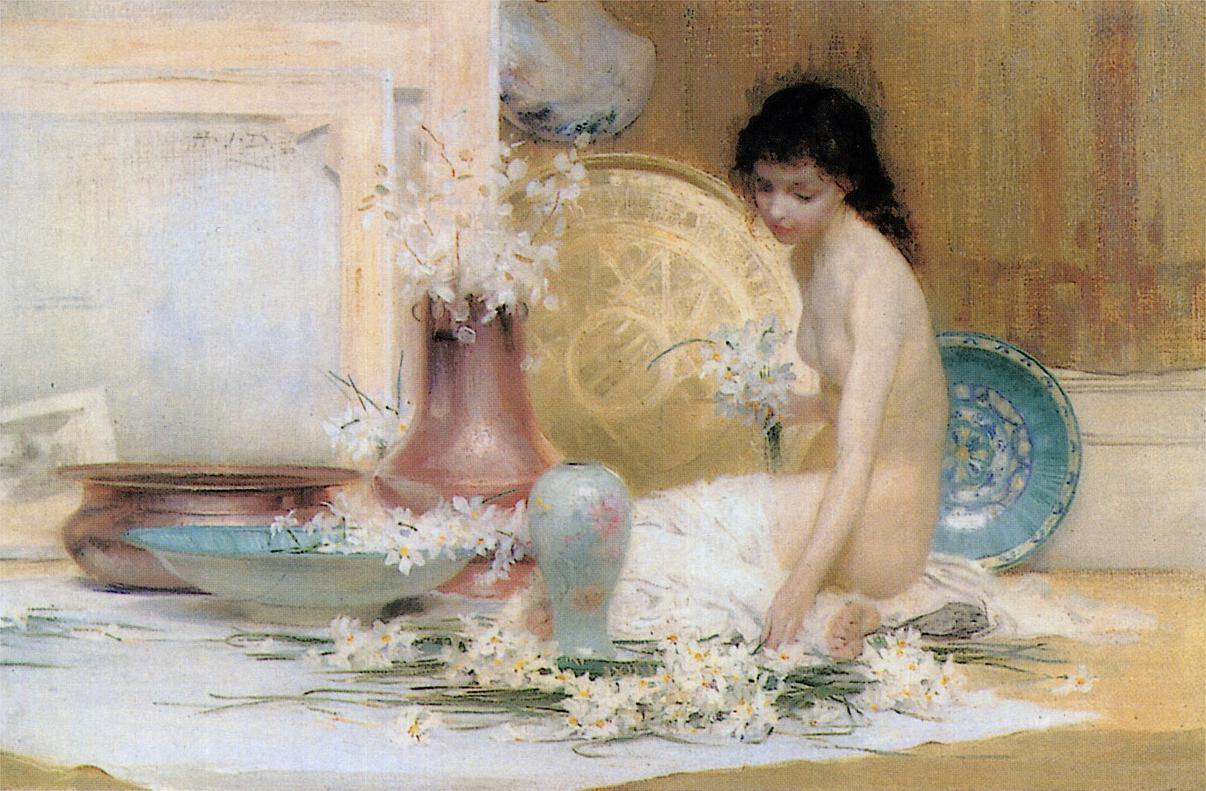
In the Studio

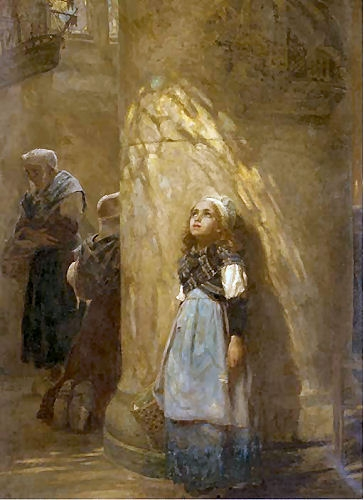
The Golden Rays

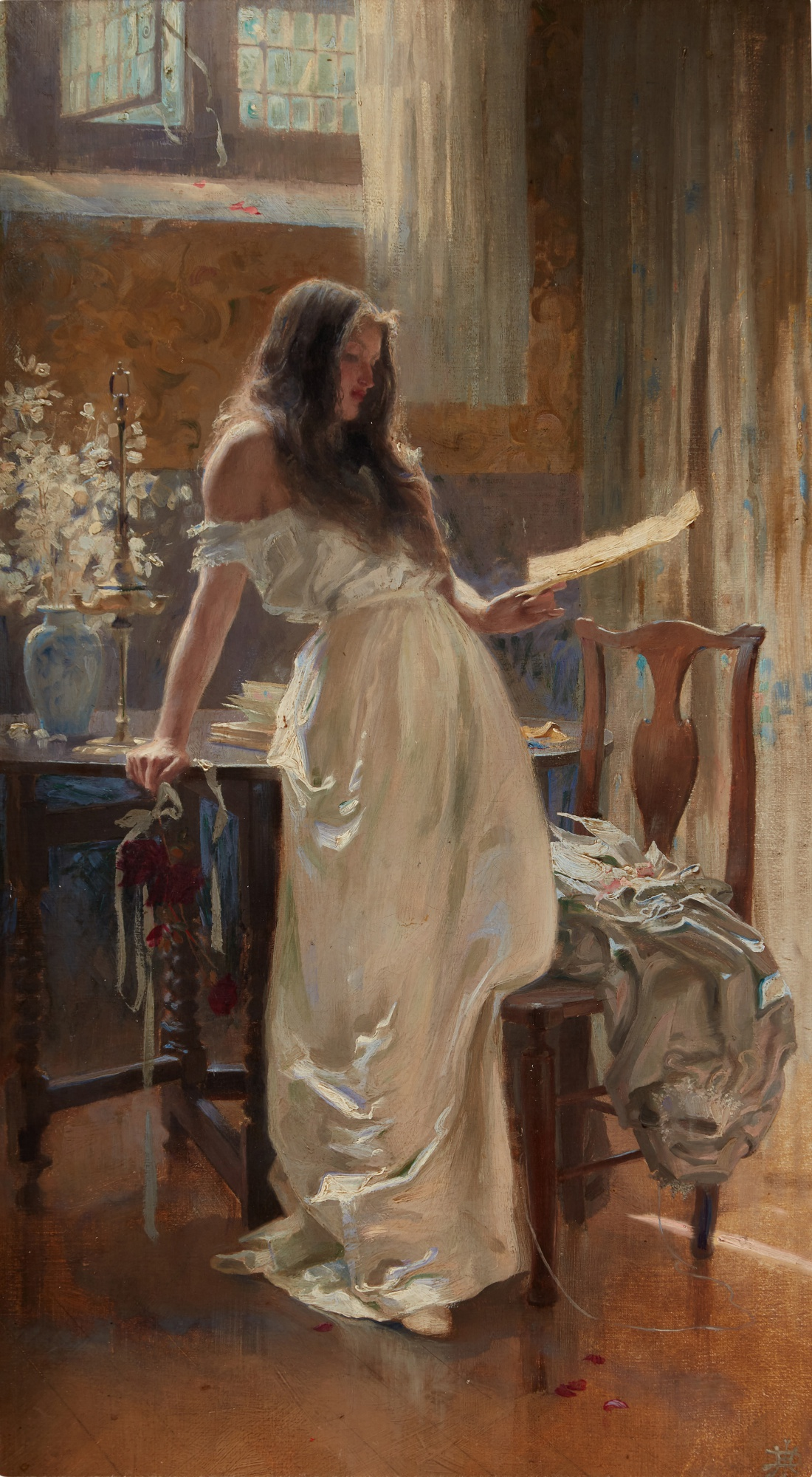
Go Lovely Rose! Tell her that Wastes her Time and Mine

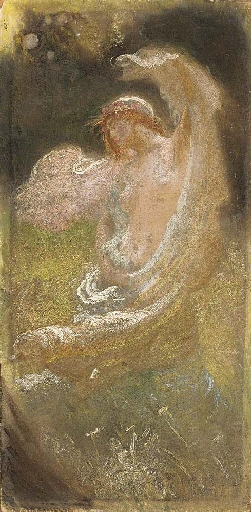
A Nymph in a Sunlit Glade

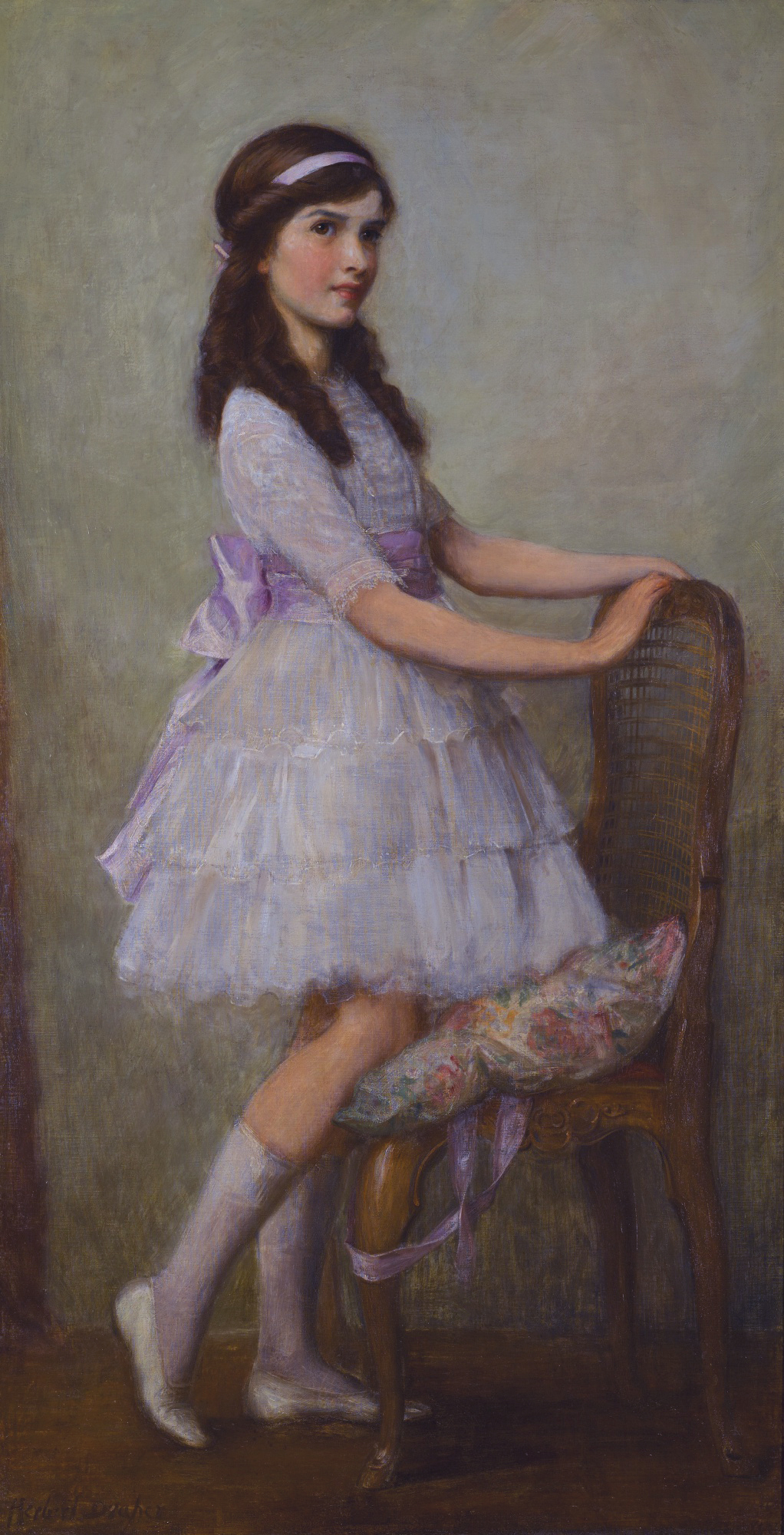
Portrait of Miss Barbara De Selincourt

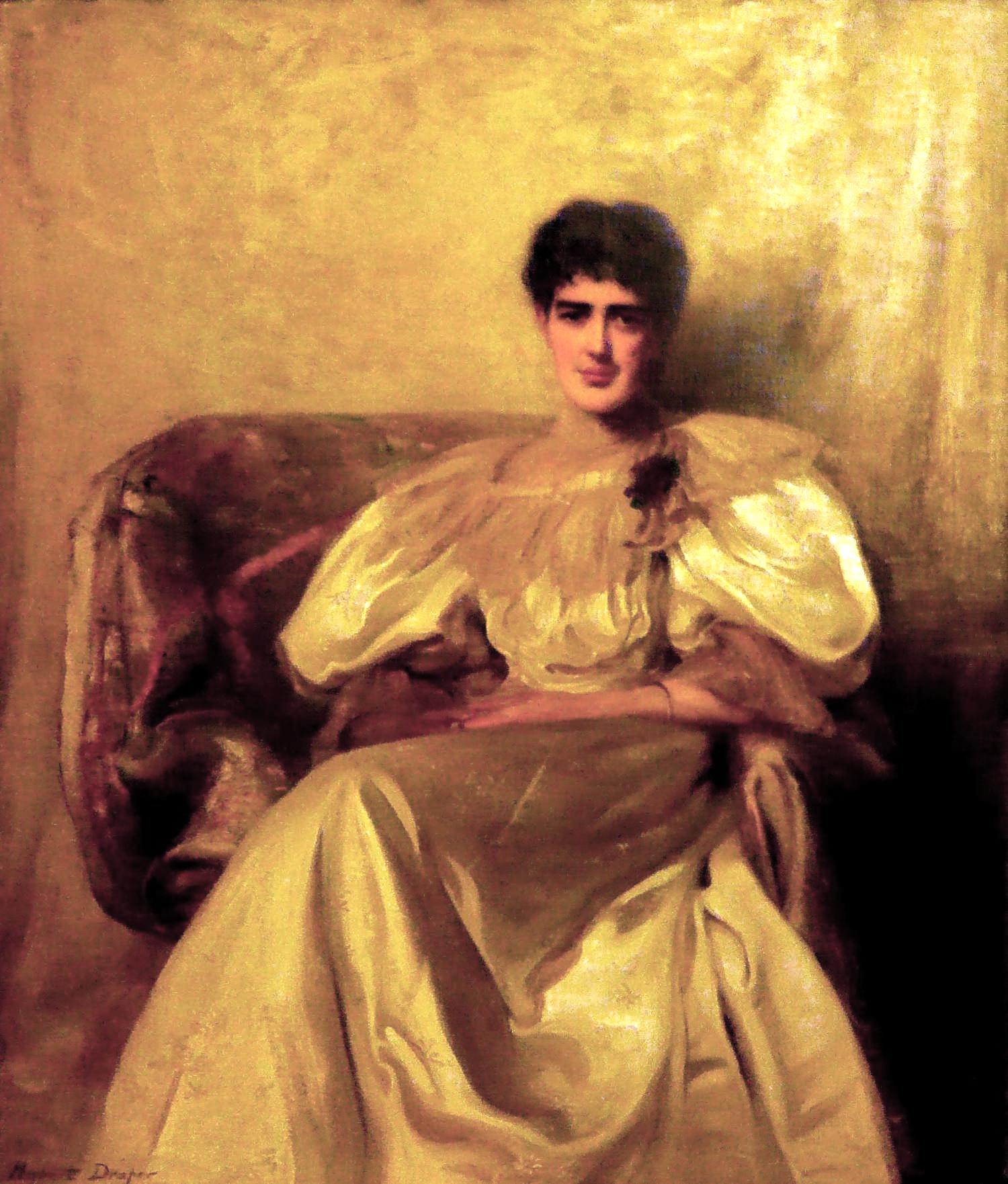
Portrait of Ida Draper

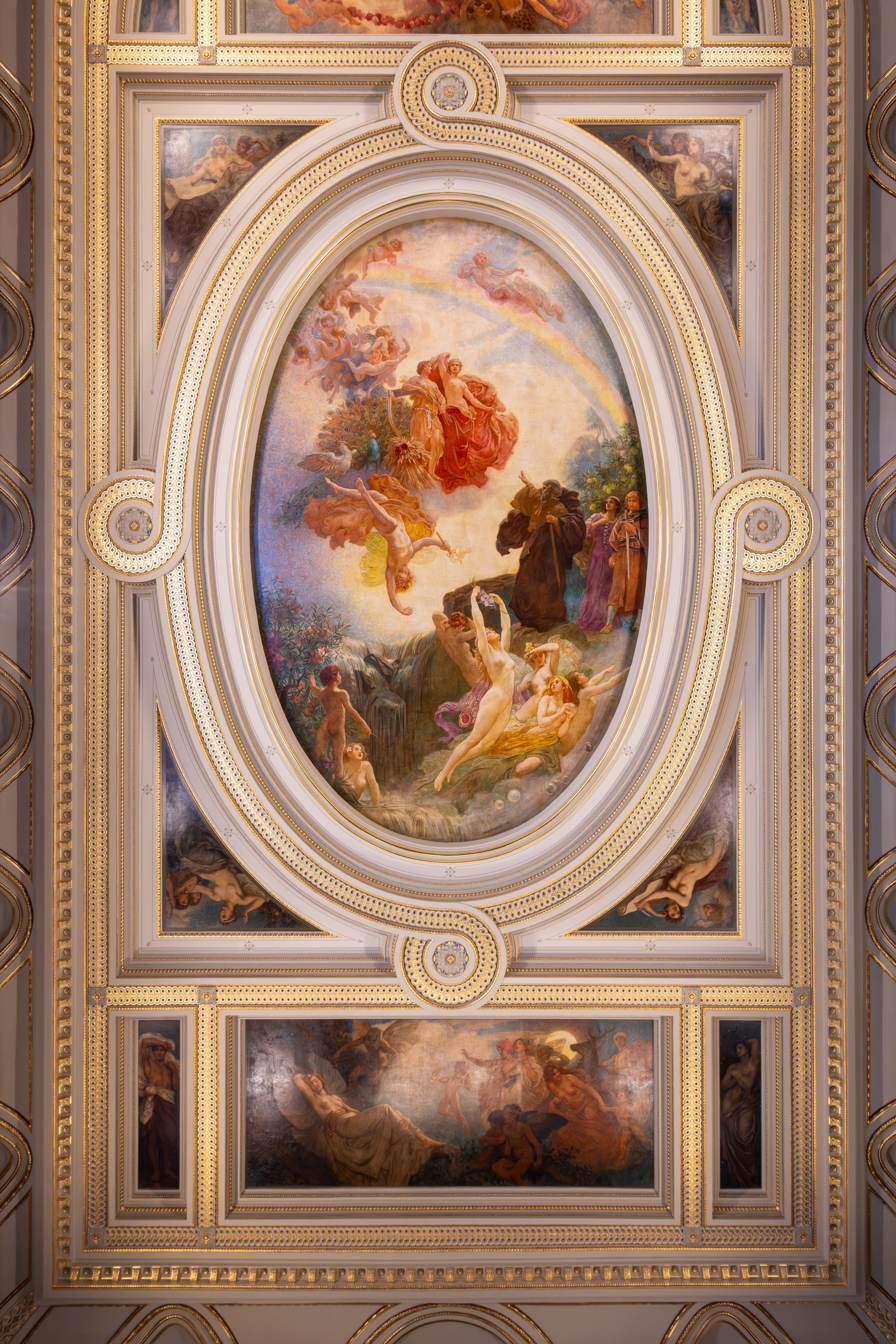
Ceiling of Livery Hall in Drapers' Hall, London
