= Christmas in July (film) =

1940 film by Preston Sturges

- Theatrical poster
- Directed by: Preston Sturges
- Screenplay by: Preston Sturges
- Based on: A Cup of Coffee; 1931 play by Preston Sturges
- Produced by: Paul Jones; Buddy G. DeSylva (Note: Uncredited.)
- Starring: Dick Powell; Ellen Drew; Raymond Walburn; William Demarest
- Cinematography: Victor Milner
- Edited by: Ellsworth Hoagland
- Music by: John Leipold; Leo Shuken
- Distributed by: Paramount Pictures
- Release date: October 18, 1940
- Running time: 67 minutes
- Country: United States
- Language: English

Christmas in July is a 1940 American screwball comedy film written and directed by Preston Sturges, and starring Dick Powell and Ellen Drew.

Based on Sturges' unproduced 1931 play A Cup of Coffee, it follows an ambitious clerk who is tricked into thinking he has won $25,000 in a coffee company slogan contest, and begins using the prize money he is errantly given to fulfill his dreams. It was Sturges' second film as writer-director, after The Great McGinty earlier in 1940.

== Plot ==
Maxford House Coffee company owner Dr. Maxford is thoroughly exasperated; he is supposed to announce on national radio the winners of a $25,000 slogan contest for his flagship brew, but stubborn Mr. Bildocker has the jury deadlocked. Embarrassingly, the program ends without an announcement.

Office worker Jimmy MacDonald has sweated out an entry and has grandiose dreams of winning, hoping to prove himself to the world, provide some luxuries for his mother, and marry his girlfriend, Betty Casey. Betty does not understand his punning slogan: "If you can't sleep at night, it's not the coffee, it's the bunk."

As a joke, three of his co-workers place a fake telegram on Jimmy's desk informing him that he has won. Jimmy's boss, J. B. Baxter, is so impressed that he promotes him on the spot to advertising executive, with his own office, a private secretary, and a raise. Tom Darcy, one of the pranksters, tries to clear things up before they go too far, but loses his nerve.

When Jimmy arrives to collect his prize, Dr. Maxford assumes his committee finally reached a decision without informing him and gives a check to Jimmy. Jimmy and Betty race to Shindel's department store for a shopping spree. After telephoning Maxford House to confirm the check is good, Mr. Shindel gives Jimmy credit to buy an engagement ring, a luxury sofa-bed for his mother, and presents for all of their neighbors.

When the truth comes out, Shindel descends on Jimmy's apartment to try to repossess his merchandise. Maxford also shows up trying to get his money back. In the commotion that erupts outside the building, Shindel learns that Maxford's signature on the check is genuine; instead of reclaiming the merchandise, he tries to force Maxford to pay for it. Tom and the other two pranksters admit they are to blame.

That night, Jimmy and Betty confess the mixup to Baxter, who seeks to dismiss the young fraud. Betty's heartfelt plea persuades Baxter to let Jimmy try to prove himself, put on a short leash without the raise, but keeping the promotion. Baxter agrees.

Back at Maxford House, Bildocker bursts into Dr. Maxford's office to announce that, unawares, the jury has chosen a winner: Jimmy MacDonald.

== Cast ==
- Dick Powell as Jimmy MacDonald
- Ellen Drew as Betty Casey
- Raymond Walburn as Dr. Maxford
- Alexander Carr as Mr. Shindel
- William Demarest as Mr. Bildocker
- Ernest Truex as J. B. Baxter
- Franklin Pangborn as Don Hartman, the radio announcer
- Harry Hayden as E. L. Waterbury, Jimmy's office manager
- Rod Cameron as Dick, a co-worker
- Adrian Morris as Tom Darcy, a co-worker
- Harry Rosenthal as Harry, a co-worker
- Georgia Caine as Mrs. Ellen MacDonald
- Ferike Boros as Mrs. Schwartz
- Torben Meyer as Mr. Schmidt, a Shindel's employee
- Julius Tannen as Mr. Zimmerman
- Al Bridge as Mr. Hillbeiner, a jewelry salesman at Shindel's
- Lucille Ward as Mrs. Casey
- Kay Stewart as Maxford's secretary
- Victor Potel as Davenola salesman
- Fred Toones as Sam the janitor

== Production ==
The working titles for Christmas in July were The New Yorkers, Something to Shout About and A Cup of Coffee, the latter of which was the name of the play Sturges wrote in 1931 on which the film was based.

In 1934, Universal hired Sturges to direct a film based on the play, but that project fell through when the studio found other work to assign him, including doctoring the script of Diamond Jim. Once that task was completed, Sturges' mentor at the studio, producer Henry Henigson, left, leaving nobody at Universal to champion Sturges' project. Sturges moved to Paramount, and made a deal with the studio to buy the script for $6,000.

William Holden and Betty Field were slated to played the leads, with Arthur Hornblow Jr. as producer.

Production on Christmas in July began on June 1, 1940, and continued through June 29. According to author Donald Spoto in his book Madcap: The Life of Preston Sturges, Sturges directed the film wearing a straw boater and carrying a bamboo cane.

Christmas in July was the only time Sturges worked with Dick Powell and Ellen Drew, but many actors from Sturges' "stock company" appeared. Headed by William Demarest, they included George Anderson, Al Bridge, Georgia Caine, Jimmy Conlin, Harry Hayden, Arthur Hoyt, Torben Meyer, Charles R. Moore, Frank Moran, Franklin Pangborn, Victor Potel, Dewey Robinson, Harry Rosenthal, Julius Tannen and Robert Warwick.

This was the fourth of ten films written by Sturges in which Demarest appeared. (Note: Demarest appeared in Diamond Jim (1935), Easy Living (1937), The Great McGinty (1940), Christmas in July (1940), The Lady Eve (1941), Sullivan's Travels (1941), The Palm Beach Story (1942), The Miracle of Morgan's Creek (1944), Hail the Conquering Hero (1944) and The Great Moment (1944).) Sturges makes a cameo appearance as a man at a shoeshine stand.

A Cup of Coffee remained unproduced until 1988, when Soho Rep in New York City mounted a production.

== Release ==
The film had preview screenings in Los Angeles in September 1940 before being released theatrically in the United States on October 18, 1940.

== Critical response ==
Bosley Crowther of The New York Times praised the film, writing that, "As a creator of rich and human comedy Mr. Sturges is closing fast on the heels of Frank Capra. If you wish a really good way to spend some election winnings, we suggest that you take your friends—especially the loser—to see Christmas in July." The Los Angeles Times's Edwin Schallert praised star Ellen Drew's "tour de force" performance, and added that the film "reproves the fact that Preston Sturges has much to offer as the builder and deviser of motion pictures."

Variety gave the film a middling review, noting: "Picture has its moments of comedy and interest, but these are interspersed too frequently by obvious and boresome episodes that swing too much to the talkie side. There are flashes of the by-play and incidental intimate touches displayed by Sturges in his first picture, but not enough to bridge over the tedious episodes."

== Home media ==
The film was released on video in the U.S. on July 12, 1990, and re-released on June 30, 1993. Universal Pictures Home Entertainment released the film on DVD as part of their "Universal Classics" series in 2011. Kino Lorber issued the film on Blu-ray for the first time on November 26, 2019.

== Adaptations ==
Lux Radio Theatre presented a radio adaptation of Christmas in July on June 26, 1944, with Dick Powell and Linda Darnell as leads. On September 9, 1954, NBC presented a television version on Lux Video Theatre with Nancy Gates, Alex Nicol and Raymond Walburn starring; the director was Earl Eby and the adaptation was by S.H. Barnett.

== Legacy ==
When A Cup of Coffee was produced in 1988, New York Times theater critic Mel Gussow called the play superior to the film adaptation, Gussow said that the play had an "embracing innocence" compared to the movie, and said: "By the time the story reached the screen, it was coated with cynicism, as the author added opportunistic characters and tried to turn an office comedy into a broader social commentary."

In 1998, Jonathan Rosenbaum of the Chicago Reader included the film in his unranked list of the best American films not included on the AFI Top 100.

Commenting on the film for Trailers from Hell in 2019, Glenn Erickson observed that the film "turned away from The Great McGinty's cynical hilarity about political corruption, to center on the down-home problems of ordinary people... Christmas in July looks even less expensive than The Great McGinty, perhaps for Sturges to point out to Paramount that the moneymaking value in the show was his talent. The humor is anchored in adversity — it’s the sluggish rear end of The Depression, when an average salary wasn’t enough for most young people to get married on, and opportunities for promotion were rare."

Writing for Film School Rejects in 2020, Emily Kubincanek notes the film as one of Sturges' most underrated films: "There’s a sincerity to Christmas in July that is hard to do with screwball comedy, but Sturges pulls it off beautifully. He has a way of examining the intersection between money and love, but this movie is rarely thought of among his best work. It has everything that audiences love in Sturges’ other films, like The Palm Beach Story and Sullivan’s Travels. It's farcical, witty, down to earth, and full of fast-paced comedy. Christmas in July has also been nominated for lists like the AFI Top 100 Funniest American Movies list (which features four Sturges films), but it never makes the cut."

== Sources ==
- Beach, Christopher (2002). Class, Language, and American Film Comedy. Cambridge, England: Cambridge University Press. ISBN 978-0-521-00209-7.
