= List of actors who frequently worked with Preston Sturges =

Actors who frequently worked with film director Preston Sturges:

Actor	The Great McGinty (1940)	Christmas in July (1940)	The Lady Eve (1941)	Sullivan's Travels (1941)	The Palm Beach Story (1942)	The Miracle of Morgan's Creek (1942)	Hail the Conquering Hero (1944)	The Great Moment (1944)	The Sin of Harold Diddlebock (1947)	Unfaithfully Yours (1948)	The Beautiful Blonde from Bashful Bend (1949)	The French, They Are a Funny Race (1955)	Total
George Anderson	☒	☒		☒	☒		☒	☒					6
Sig Arno					☒			☒					2
Eric Blore			☒	☒									2
Eddie Bracken						☒	☒						2
Al Bridge		☒	☒	☒	☒	☒	☒	☒	☒	☒	☒		10
Georgia Caine		☒				☒	☒	☒	☒	☒	☒		7
Chester Conklin				☒	☒	☒	☒	☒			☒		6
Jimmy Conlin	☒	☒	☒	☒	☒	☒	☒	☒	☒				9
William Demarest	☒	☒	☒	☒	☒	☒	☒	☒					8
Brian Donlevy	☒					☒							2
Robert Dudley			☒	☒	☒	☒		☒	☒				6
Byron Foulger	☒			☒	☒	☒		☒					5
Robert Greig			☒	☒	☒			☒	☒	☒			6
Porter Hall				☒		☒		☒			☒		4
Thurston Hall	☒							☒					2
Margaret Hamilton									☒		☒		2
Harry Hayden			☒	☒	☒	☒	☒	☒			☒		7
Esther Howard	☒			☒	☒	☒	☒	☒			☒		7
Arthur Hoyt	☒	☒	☒	☒	☒	☒	☒	☒	☒				9
J. Farrell MacDonald				☒	☒	☒		☒	☒		☒		6
George Melford	☒		☒				☒	☒		☒	☒		6
Torben Meyer	☒	☒	☒	☒	☒	☒	☒	☒	☒	☒	☒		11
Joel McCrea				☒	☒			☒					3
Charles R. Moore	☒	☒		☒	☒		☒		☒				6
Frank Moran	☒	☒	☒	☒	☒	☒	☒	☒	☒	☒			10
Jack Norton				☒	☒	☒	☒		☒				5
Franklin Pangborn		☒		☒	☒		☒	☒	☒				6
Emory Parnell	☒			☒	☒		☒			☒			5
Snub Pollard							☒				☒		2
Victor Potel	☒	☒	☒	☒	☒	☒	☒	☒	☒				9
Dewey Robinson	☒	☒		☒	☒		☒	☒	☒		☒		8
Harry Rosenthal	☒	☒	☒	☒	☒	☒		☒	☒				8
Lionel Stander									☒	☒			2
Akim Tamiroff	☒					☒							2
Julius Tannen		☒	☒	☒	☒	☒	☒	☒	☒	☒			9
Rudy Vallée					☒				☒	☒	☒		4
Raymond Walburn		☒					☒		☒				3
Max Wagner					☒	☒		☒	☒	☒	☒		6
Robert Warwick	☒	☒	☒	☒	☒		☒						6
