= Robert Dudley (actor) =

American actor (1869–1955)

- As "The Wienie King" in The Palm Beach Story
- Born: Robert Y. Dudley; September 13, 1869; Cincinnati, Ohio, U.S.
- Died: September 15, 1955 (aged 86); San Clemente, California, U.S.
- Occupation: Actor
- Years active: 1917–1951
- Spouse: Elaine Anderson

Robert Dudley (September 13, 1869 – September 15, 1955) was a dentist turned film character actor who, in his 35-year career, appeared in more than 115 films.

== Career ==
Dudley was born in Cincinnati, Ohio and was educated at Lake Forest College in Evanston, Illinois and Chicago, where he majored in oral surgery. In 1917 he appeared in his first film, Seven Keys to Baldpate, and then made three other silent films through 1921. After 1922 he worked consistently, appearing in three or four films a year, and making the transition to sound films in 1929 with The Bellamy Trial. Dudley often played characters with a quick temper, including jurors, shopkeepers, ticket agents, court clerks and justices of the peace, as well as an occasional farmer, hobo, or laborer. His performances in these small parts were frequently uncredited.

In the 1940s, Dudley was part of Preston Sturges' unofficial "stock company" of character actors, appearing in six films written and directed by Sturges. His most distinctive and memorable role for Sturges was the Wienie King in 1942's The Palm Beach Story, the rich man with a big hat who spontaneously bankrolls Claudette Colbert and Joel McCrea on their escapade.

== Personal life and death ==
The 5' 9" Dudley, who was the founder of the Troupers Club of Hollywood, was married to Elaine Anderson, and they had two girls, Jewell and Patricia Lee. He made his final film As Young as You Feel in 1951 and died on September 15, 1955, in San Clemente, California.

== Selected filmography ==
- Seven Keys to Baldpate (1917) - Clerk
- Out of a Clear Sky (1918) - Father
- The Fourteenth Man (1920) - Tidmarsh
- The Traveling Salesman (1921) - Pierce Gill
- One a Minute (1921) - Rogers' Attorney (uncredited)
- The Village Blacksmith (1922) - Townsman (uncredited)
- The Ninety and Nine (1922) - Abner Blake
- Making a Man (1922) - Bailey
- Nobody's Bride (1923) - Uncle Peter Standish
- The Tiger's Claw (1923) - Army Officer
- Sixty Cents an Hour (1923) - Storekeeper
- The Day of Faith (1923) - Morris
- The Extra Girl (1923) - Financier (uncredited)
- Flapper Wives (1924) - Lem
- On the Stroke of Three (1924) - Jasper Saddler
- Kentucky Pride (1925) - Preacher (uncredited)
- The Last Edition (1925) - Yes Man (uncredited)
- A Woman of the World (1925) - French-Speaking Party Guest (uncredited)
- For Heaven's Sake (1926) - Harold's Secretary (uncredited)
- The Marriage Clause (1926) - Secretary
- Casey at the Bat (1927) - Farmer (uncredited)
- Lure of the Night Club (1927) - Hired man
- After Midnight (1927) - Sugar Daddy (uncredited)
- Broadway Madness (1927) - Thomas
- Good Time Charley (1927) - Optometrist (uncredited)
- Chicago (1927) - Insurance Agent (uncredited)
- The Night Flyer (1928) - Freddy
- Skinner's Big Idea (1928) - Gibbs
- Fools for Luck (1928) - Jim Simpson
- The Baby Cyclone (1928) - Minor Role (uncredited)
- The Bellamy Trial (1929) - Coroner
- Fast Freight (1929, Short) - Chief of Police
- Big News (1929) - Telegraph Editor
- The Mysterious Island (1929) - Workman (uncredited)
- Dynamite (1929) - Store Proprietor (uncredited)
- Shanghai Rose (1929) - Reformer
- Burning Up (1930) - Sheriff (uncredited)
- Wide Open (1930) - Office Worker
- Dames Ahoy! (1930) - Parson (uncredited)
- The Sins of the Children (1930) - Harry - Inventory Recorder (uncredited)
- Conspiracy (1930) - Mr. Christopher (uncredited)
- Scandal Sheet (1931) - Flint's Secretary (uncredited)
- Politics (1931) - Husband Getting Haircut (uncredited)
- An American Tragedy (1931) - Juror (uncredited)
- Range Law (1931) - Minister (uncredited)
- Three Wise Girls (1931) - Lem - the Druggist
- Broken Lullaby (1932) - Townsman (uncredited)
- Unashamed (1932) - Hearing-Impaired Juror (uncredited)
- Reunion (1932) - Sgt. Dudley
- Face in the Sky (1933) - Minister (uncredited)
- Midnight Mary (1933) - Mannering's Night Watchman (uncredited)
- Wild Gold (1934) - Hotel Clerk (uncredited)
- The Gilded Lily (1935) - Store Clerk (uncredited)
- Goin' to Town (1935) - Deputy (uncredited)
- Front Page Woman (1935) - Dissenting Juror (uncredited)
- The Case of the Lucky Legs (1935) - Contest Stage Manager (uncredited)
- Three Kids and a Queen (1935) - Shopkeeper (uncredited)
- Frisco Kid (1935) - Vigilante Leader (uncredited)
- Paddy O'Day (1936) - Robert - Chauffeur (uncredited)
- The Prisoner of Shark Island (1936) - Druggist at Trial (uncredited)
- Fury (1936) - Townsman Store Owner (uncredited)
- The Bride Walks Out (1936) - Irate Neighbor (uncredited)
- The Man I Marry (1936) - Villager (uncredited)
- The Mighty Treve (1937) - Rancher at Auction
- Racketeers in Exile (1937) - Purity League Member (uncredited)
- The Toast of New York (1937) - Janitor
- S.O.S. Coast Guard (1937) - Pierport Station Agent (uncredited)
- Springtime in the Rockies (1937) - Barn Dance Emcee (uncredited)
- The Four Feathers (1939) - Farmer (uncredited)
- Zenobia (1939) (UK: Elephants Never Forget) - Court Clerk
- A Woman Is the Judge (1939) - Prosecutor (uncredited)
- Mr. Smith Goes to Washington (1939) - Reporter (uncredited)
- The Amazing Mr. Williams (1939) - Citizens Committee Man (uncredited)
- The House of the Seven Gables (1940) - Jury Foreman (uncredited)
- Haunted House (1940) - Hank Edwards (uncredited)
- When the Daltons Rode (1940) - Pete Norris - Juror (uncredited)
- Lucky Partners (1940) - Bailiff (uncredited)
- Stranger on the Third Floor (1940) - Postman (uncredited)
- The Lady Eve (1941) - Husband on Ship (uncredited)
- Citizen Kane (1941) - Photographer (uncredited)
- The Devil and Daniel Webster (1941) - Lem (uncredited)
- Skylark (1941) - Pedestrian (uncredited)
- Sullivan's Travels (1941) - One-Legged Hobo (uncredited)
- Syncopation (1942) - Bartender (uncredited)
- The Palm Beach Story (1942) - Wienie King
- Campeão da Liberdade (1942) - Man in Shop (uncredited)
- The Ghost and the Guest (1943) - Ben Bowron
- Follow the Band (1943) - Seth Cathcart (uncredited)
- Honeymoon Lodge (1943) - Elderly Man (uncredited)
- Son of Dracula (1943) - Jonathan Kirby, Justice of the Peace (uncredited)
- Happy Land (1943) - Old Man Bowers (uncredited)
- The Miracle of Morgan's Creek (1944) - Man (uncredited)
- It Happened Tomorrow (1944) - A. Seemer (uncredited)
- Sensations of 1945 (1944) - Minor Role (uncredited)
- The Great Moment (1944) - Charles - Morton's Cashier (uncredited)
- Casanova Brown (1944) - Justice of the Peace (uncredited)
- The Doughgirls (1944) - Waiter with Fruit Bowl (uncredited)
- The Big Noise (1944) - Grandpa (uncredited)
- Nothing but Trouble (1944) - Old Man (uncredited)
- Music for Millions (1944) - Rafferty - Postman (uncredited)
- Belle of the Yukon (1944) - Storekeeper (uncredited)
- I'll Be Seeing You (1944) - Pine Hills YMCA Hotel Attendant (uncredited)
- Lady on a Train (1945) - Man in Newsreel Theatre (uncredited)
- The Strange Affair of Uncle Harry (1945) - Stationmaster (uncredited)
- San Antonio (1945) - The Telegrapher (uncredited)
- Colonel Effingham's Raid (1946) - Pete (uncredited)
- Breakfast in Hollywood (1946) - 78-Year-Old Man (uncredited)
- Cinderella Jones (1946) - Secretary (uncredited)
- A Stolen Life (1946) - Old Fisherman (uncredited)
- They Made Me a Killer (1946) - Station Master (uncredited)
- Gallant Journey (1946) - Process Server (uncredited)
- Singin' in the Corn (1946) - Gramp McCoy
- The Sin of Harold Diddlebock (1947) - Robert McDuffy
- Living in a Big Way (1947) - Old Carpenter (uncredited)
- Magic Town (1947) - Dickey
- Christmas Eve (1947) - Robert (uncredited)
- Mourning Becomes Electra (1947) - Chemist (uncredited)
- Sleep, My Love (1948) - Peeping Tom at The Maples (uncredited)
- Race Street (1948) - Pop - Watchman (uncredited)
- Strike It Rich (1948) - Pop - the Postmaster
- Portrait of Jennie (1948) - Another Old Mariner (uncredited)
- Johnny Holiday (1949) - Bill Barnett, Old Shoemaker (uncredited)
- The Jackpot (1950) - Mr. Simpkins (uncredited)
- As Young as You Feel (1951) - Old Man on Park Bench (não creditado) (final film role)
