= Harry Rosenthal =

American actor

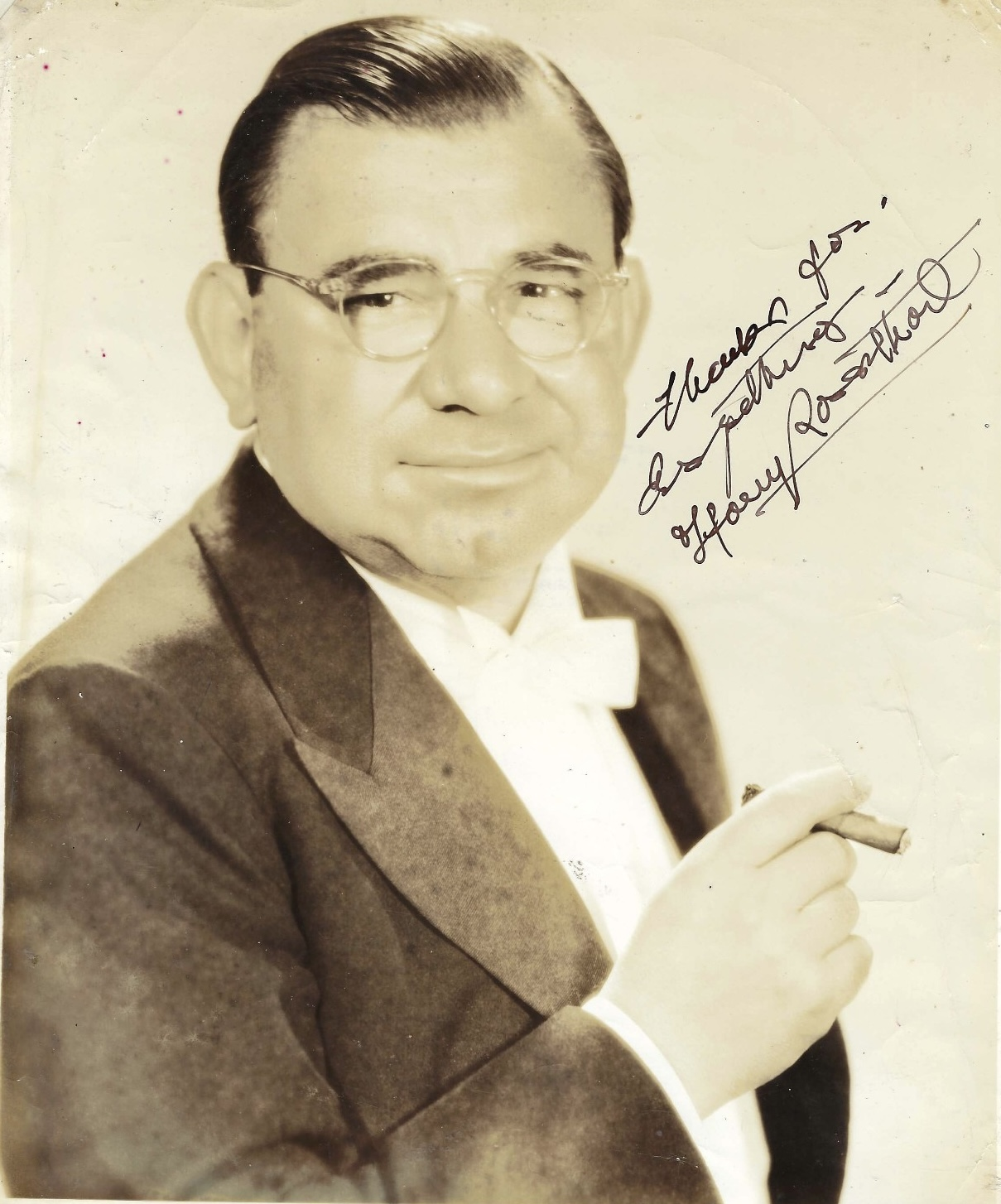
- Born: May 15, 1893; Belfast, Ireland
- Died: May 10, 1953 (aged 59); Beverly Hills, California U.S.
- Occupations: actor, composer, pianist, orchestra leader
- Years active: c.1920–1949

Harry Rosenthal (15 May c. 1893 – 10 May 1953) was an orchestra leader, composer, pianist and actor.

== Biography ==
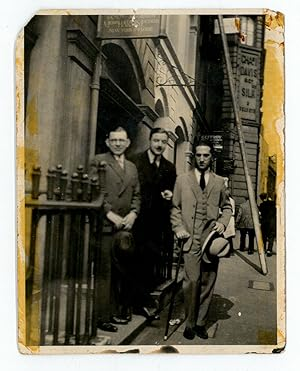
Harry Rosenthal Walter Eastman George Gershwin Chappell & Co., London

Rosenthal was born in Belfast in 1893, and by the 1920s he was in London where he had a thriving musical career as a composer, bandleader and pianist, including composing five operettas which met with great success. He came to the United States by 1929, when he wrote songs for Herbert Stothart's musical Polly on Broadway, and in 1930 acted in Ring Lardner and George S. Kaufman's play June Moon, which was revived in 1933. After he met Edward, the Prince of Wales at a reception, he accompanied the heir to the British throne on a world tour.

Rosenthal's film career began in 1931 and ended in 1948, during which time he worked on 19 films, playing pianists, orchestra leaders and also non-musical roles, as well as composing music (for The Sin of Harold Diddlebock) and conducting (on For Me and My Gal). In the early 1940s, Rosenthal was part of writer-director Preston Sturges' unofficial "stock company" of character actors, appearing in all of Sturges' films from The Great McGinty (1940) through The Sin of Harold Diddlebock (1947) with the exception of Hail the Conquering Hero.

Both in New York and in Hollywood, Rosenthal was often mentioned in gossip columns, surprisingly so, given the small size of the parts he played. His death in 1953, from a heart attack, was similarly noted.

== Filmography ==
Year	Title	Role	Notes
1931	Merely Mary Ann		
1939	Tail Spin	Harrison, Cafe Manager	Uncredited
1939	Wife, Husband and Friend	Bill Wilkins	
1940	Johnny Apollo	Piano Player	performed two songs
1940	The Great McGinty	Louie - The Boss' Bodyguard	
1940	Christmas in July	Harry	
1941	The Lady Eve	Piano Tuner	Uncredited
1941	Unfinished Business	Piano Player	
1941	Birth of the Blues	Piano Player	
1941	Sullivan's Travels	The Trombenick	
1942	The Palm Beach Story	Orchestra Leader	
1942	For Me and My Gal	Orchestra Conductor & Arranger	Uncredited, also music conductor
1943	Presenting Lily Mars	Pianist	Uncredited
1944	The Miracle of Morgan's Creek		
1944	The Great Moment	Mr. Chamberlain	Uncredited
1945	The Horn Blows at Midnight	Sherman Starr	Uncredited
1947	The Sin of Harold Diddlebock	Reveler	Uncredited, also composer
1948	The Big Clock	Charlie	
1949	Red, Hot and Blue	Piano Player	Uncredited, (final film role)
