= Diamond Jim =

1935 film directed by A. Edward Sutherland

- Film poster
- Directed by: A. Edward Sutherland
- Written by: Book: Parker Morrell; Adaptation: Harry Clork; Doris Malloy; Screenplay: Preston Sturges
- Based on: Diamond Jim Brady by Parker Morell
- Produced by: Edmund Grainger
- Starring: Edward Arnold; Jean Arthur; Cesar Romero; Binnie Barnes
- Cinematography: George Robinson
- Edited by: Daniel Mandell
- Music by: Franz Waxman; Ferde Grofé Sr. (uncredited)
- Distributed by: Universal Pictures
- Release date: August 1935
- Running time: 88 minutes
- Country: United States
- Language: English
- Budget: over $750,000

Diamond Jim is a 1935 biographical film based on the published biography Diamond Jim Brady by Parker Morell. It follows the life of legendary entrepreneur James Buchanan Brady, including his romance with entertainer Lillian Russell, and stars Edward Arnold, Jean Arthur, Cesar Romero and Binnie Barnes.

The screenplay by Preston Sturges never lets the lurid facts of Brady's life get in the way of the story. Edward Arnold went on to play Diamond Jim Brady again five years later, opposite Alice Faye in Lillian Russell.

== Plot ==
Diamond Jim Brady is born to an Irish saloonkeeper and his wife in 1856, but is soon orphaned. At the age of thirty, working as baggage master at the Spuyten Duyvil train station, he rents a suit and a diamond from a pawn shop, and gets a job as a salesman; soon, he is the top salesman on the staff.

While on a cross-continental sales trip, Brady rescues Mr. Fox from a crooked salesman, but in the process they are forced to jump from the train. Brady soon discovers that Mr. Fox is trying to sell something called an "undertruck" to be used at railroad stations, so he takes on the product himself. With success, Brady wants to marry his sweetheart, Emma Perry, but finds out that she is engaged. Heartbroken, he devotes all of his energy to the Brady-Fox Company.

A grand success, Brady has ostentatious diamond jewelry designed for him, leading to his nickname, "Diamond Jim Brady". Brady spares no expense to indulge his every whim, lavishing money on wine, women, song and especially food. Brady sees singer Lillian Russell perform, introduces himself, and soon he is promoting her career and flirting with her. Russell, however, is in love with businessman Jerry Richardson. Brady soon meets Jane Matthews, a lookalike for Emma, and is instantly smitten with her. They become engaged, but on the eve of their wedding, Brady gets drunk because of his suspicions about Jane's relationship with a banker named "Briggs" who is supposedly her "uncle", and the wedding is called off. Jane remains his friend, but refuses to give in to his occasional proposals – for one thing, she has fallen in love with Jerry, but neither want to tell Brady for fear of hurting his feelings.

When the stock market crashes, Brady loses his fortune, and starts again from scratch, promoting a steel railroad car for its supposed safety. He is injured during a public demonstration of the car, and spends a year recovering in the hospital, while at the same time rebuilding his fortune. When he gets out, he plans a trip to Europe for himself, Jane, Lillian and Jerry, during which he believes he will finally get Jane to marry him. Instead, Jane and Jerry confess their love, the news of which shatters Jim. On the rebound, he proposes to Lillian, but she rejects him as well. Despondent, he returns home and prepares to eat himself to death, but not before burning up all the I.O.U.'s in his possession.

== Cast ==
- Edward Arnold as Diamond Jim Brady
- Jean Arthur as Jane Matthews / Emma
- Binnie Barnes as Lillian Russell
- Cesar Romero as Jerry Richardson
- Eric Blore as Sampson Fox
- Hugh O'Connell as Charles B. Horsley
- George Sidney as Pawnbroker
- Robert McWade as A.E. Moore
- Charles Sellon as Touchey
- Henry Kolker as Bank President
- William Demarest as Harry Hill
- Albert Conti as Jeweler
- Armand Kaliz as Jewelry Salesman
- Tully Marshall as Minister
- Purnell Pratt as Physician
- Helen Brown as Brady's Mother
- Mabel Colcord as Brady's Aunt
- Jack Mower as Man (uncredited)

Cast notes:

- This was the first film written by Preston Sturges in which William Demarest appeared, but it was not to be the last. Demarest would go on show up in nine other Sturges films: Easy Living (1937), The Great McGinty (1940), Christmas in July (1940), Sullivan's Travels (1941), The Lady Eve (1941), The Palm Beach Story (1942), The Miracle of Morgan's Creek (1944), Hail the Conquering Hero (1944) and The Great Moment (1944).

Symphonic composer Ferde Grofe wrote a large amount of the score, yet remained uncredited on the movie.

== Production ==
Diamond Jim, which had a working title of Diamond Jim Brady, was based on the 1933 biography of Brady by Parker Morrell, to which Universal purchased the rights. However, prior to that, Paramount Pictures had bought the rights to a short story by Mike Simmons based on Brady's life, and had registered the title with the Hays Office. Paramount subsequently protested Universal's production, but how the matter was resolved is not known.

Brady died in 1917, but Edward Arnold had met him twice early in his acting career: once when Brady came to meet an actress who was performing in the show Arnold was in, and once when he came backstage to meet Ethel Barrymore, whose acting company Arnold was a part of.

Joseph Breen, head of the Hays Office, objected to the sexual innuendo in the relationship between "Jane" and "Briggs", who was supposedly her uncle, and wanted it changed as it violated the Code. In addition, Dorothy Russell, the daughter of Lillian Russell, objected that the screenplay misrepresented the relationship between Brady and Russell, which she characterized as not a lifelong friendship, but a short term acquaintanceship that lasted only from 1902 to 1916. She also believed that the film used material from an article about her mother she had written which was published in a magazine. She engaged an attorney to file a lawsuit, but the outcome is unknown.

Diamond Jim was in production from 3 April to 20 May 1935, at a cost of over $750,000. The filming of the train crash took place at a narrow-gauge railway near San Luis Obispo, California with vintage cars donated by the Pacific Coast Railway. Jack Foley, head of Universal's sound effects department, recorded the crash.

== Reception ==
The film opened in the United States in the week of August 25, 1935 including in New York City; Omaha (in a double bill with Paris in Spring); Philadelphia and San Francisco. It set a house record at the Roxy Theatre in New York City with a first week gross of $47,000.

== In popular culture ==
- In Tim and Eric's Billion Dollar Movie, "Diamond Jim" is the name of the movie within the movie, which serves as the opening scene, starring John Depp.
- In the novel Jitterbug Perfume, author Tom Robbins compares one of the principal characters to Diamond Jim: "When Madame Devalier raised her voice, it was like Diamond Jim raising a poker pot. Even the termites in the foundation paid attention."

== See also ==
- Lillian Russell, the 1940 film where Arnold played Brady again
