= Charles R. Moore (actor) =

American actor (1893–1947)

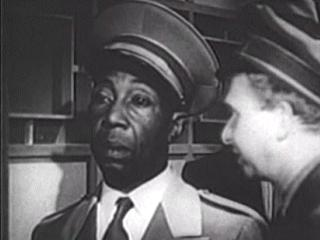
- Moore in Second Chorus (1940)
- Born: Charles Randolph Moore; April 23, 1893; Chicago, Illinois U.S.
- Died: July 20, 1947 (aged 54); Los Angeles, California U.S.
- Occupation: Actor
- Years active: 1917–1947

Charles R. Moore (April 23, 1893 – July 20, 1947) was an American actor who appeared in over 100 films in his acting career, and was sometimes credited as Charles Moore or Charlie Moore.

== Biography ==
Moore was born in Chicago in 1893. Over his career, Moore played small parts such as servants, bootblacks, elevator operators, menial laborers, and, especially, railroad porters and Red Caps. In Meet John Doe, he played a City Hall janitor trying to smoke a cigar while washing the floor on the Christmas Eve that John Doe has threatened to jump off the building. Moore was part of Preston Sturges' unofficial "stock company" of character actors, appearing in six of Sturges' films. In Sullivan's Travels, Moore played a chef who is propelled headfirst through the roof of the land yacht during a chase scene.

Moore was also a dancer, but that skill was not often called for in his film appearances.

Moore died in Los Angeles in 1947.

== Selected filmography ==
- Your Obedient Servant (1917)
- The Homesteader (1919) - Jack Stewart
- The Ninety and Nine (1922) - Sam Grant
- The Trial of Mary Dugan (1929) - James Madison
- His First Command (1929) - Homer
- A Daughter of the Congo (1930) - John Calvert
- The Divorcee (1930) - First Porter Opening Window (uncredited)
- The Prodigal (1931) - Railroad Porter (uncredited)
- The Exile (1931) - Jack Stewart
- New Adventures of Get Rich Quick Wallingford (1931) - Bootblack (uncredited)
- Love Is a Racket (1932) - Sam - Eddie's Elevator Operator (uncredited)
- Million Dollar Legs (1932) - Porter (uncredited)
- Blonde Venus (1932) - Charlie, the Bartender (uncredited)
- Madison Square Garden (1932) - Bootblack (uncredited)
- Girl Missing (1933) - Elevator Operator (uncredited)
- Fast Workers (1933) - Liar Fined in Court (uncredited)
- The Constant Woman (1933) - Speakeasy Piano Player (uncredited)
- Ann Carver's Profession (1933) - Trial Witness (uncredited)
- I Loved You Wednesday (1933) - Elevator Operator / Porter (uncredited)
- I Love That Man (1933) - Oscar- Elevator Operator (uncredited)
- Fugitive Lovers (1934) - Porter (uncredited)
- Manhattan Melodrama (1934) - Black Man in Speakeasy (uncredited)
- He Was Her Man (1934) - Manhattan Turkish Bath Attendant (uncredited)
- Now I'll Tell (1934) - Gambling House Attendant (uncredited)
- Black Moon (1934) - Black House Servant (uncredited)
- Call It Luck (1934) - Stablehand (uncredited)
- Have a Heart (1934) - (scenes deleted)
- The Captain Hates the Sea (1934) - Train Porter (uncredited)
- I'll Fix It (1934) - Nifty
- Transient Lady (1935) - Servant (uncredited)
- It's a Small World (1935) - Doorman (uncredited)
- Reckless (1935) - Train Porter (uncredited)
- The Awakening of Jim Burke (1935) - Porter (uncredited)
- Love Me Forever (1935) - Janitor (scenes deleted)
- Front Page Woman (1935) - Black Man (uncredited)
- Page Miss Glory (1935) - The Porter (uncredited)
- Diamond Jim (1935) - Cook (uncredited)
- King Solomon of Broadway (1935) - Waiter (uncredited)
- Exclusive Story (1936) - Bootblack (uncredited)
- Florida Special (1936) - George the Porter (uncredited)
- F-Man (1936) - Black Attendant (uncredited)
- 36 Hours to Kill (1936) - Red Cap (uncredited)
- Three Married Men (1936) - Porter (uncredited)
- Killer at Large (1936) - Highpockets (uncredited)
- The Accusing Finger (1936) - Black Prisoner (uncredited)
- White Hunter (1936) - Minor Role (uncredited)
- College Holiday (1936) - Red-Cap Porter (uncredited)
- Counterfeit Lady (1936) - The Porter (uncredited)
- Internes Can't Take Money (1937) - Elevator Operator (uncredited)
- Saratoga (1937) - Bartender on Train (uncredited)
- Start Cheering (1938) - Train Porter (uncredited)
- Doctor Rhythm (1938) - Tooter, the Chauffeur
- Professor Beware (1938) - Bootblack (uncredited)
- The Main Event (1938) - Redcap Reporter (uncredited)
- Spring Madness (1938) - Excited Porter in Diner (uncredited)
- Adventure in Sahara (1938) - Gungadin
- Comet Over Broadway (1938) - Sam - Cleaning Man (uncredited)
- Kentucky (1938) - Stable Swipe (uncredited)
- Smashing the Spy Ring (1938) - Man Finding Dollar (uncredited)
- God's Step Children (1938) - School Superintendent
- St. Louis Blues (1939) - Porter (uncredited)
- Southward Ho (1939) - Skeeter
- Big Town Czar (1939) - Ray (uncredited)
- Only Angels Have Wings (1939) - Charlie - Waiter (uncredited)
- A Woman Is the Judge (1939)
- Mr. Smith Goes to Washington (1939) - Porter (uncredited)
- Star Dust (1940) - Train Porter (uncredited)
- Two Girls on Broadway (1940) - Colored Porter at Bus Station (uncredited)
- Queen of the Mob (1940) - Cocktail Party Butler
- Maryland (1940) - (uncredited)
- Carolina Moon (1940) - Servant (uncredited)
- The Great McGinty (1940) - McGinty's Valet (uncredited)
- So You Won't Talk (1940) - Bootblack (uncredited)
- Christmas in July (1940) - Valet in Maxford's Office (uncredited)
- Tin Pan Alley (1940) - Porter at Railroad Station (uncredited)
- The Lone Wolf Keeps a Date (1940) - Sam - Carriage Driver (uncredited)
- Second Chorus (1940) - Sam - Elevator Operator (uncredited)
- Tall, Dark and Handsome (1941) - Train Porter (uncredited)
- Virginia (1941) - Servant (uncredited)
- Petticoat Politics (1941) - Newt
- Blonde Inspiration (1941) - Elevator Operator (uncredited)
- Meet John Doe (1941) - City Hall Janitor (uncredited)
- Sleepers West (1941) - Porter (uncredited)
- Desert Bandit (1941) - T-Bone Jones
- Kansas Cyclone (1941) - T-Bone
- Hit the Road (1941) - Martin
- The Little Foxes (1941) - Simon
- Jesse James at Bay (1941) - Mose (uncredited)
- The Night of January 16th (1941) - Porter (uncredited)
- Sullivan's Travels (1941) - Colored Chef
- Rings on Her Fingers (1942) - Porter (uncredited)
- My Favorite Blonde (1942) - Pullman Porter (uncredited)
- This Gun for Hire (1942) - Pullman Waiter (uncredited)
- Syncopation (1942) - Basin Street Denizen (uncredited)
- Beyond the Blue Horizon (1942) - Gardener (uncredited)
- Calling Dr. Gillespie (1942) - Porter (uncredited)
- The Palm Beach Story (1942) - Colored Porter
- Sunset Serenade (1942) - Sam (uncredited)
- I Married a Witch (1942) - Rufus - Samuel's Servant (uncredited)
- Strictly in the Groove (1942) - Cactus (uncredited)
- Andy Hardy's Double Life (1942) - Train Porter (uncredited)
- Lady Bodyguard (1943) - Train Porter (uncredited)
- Happy Go Lucky (1943) - Pandro - the Bellhop (uncredited)
- Dixie (1943) - News Vendor (uncredited)
- Hers to Hold (1943) - Chauffeur (uncredited)
- Son of Dracula (1943) - Matthew, Plantation Worker (uncredited)
- Riding High (1943) - Porter (uncredited)
- Calling Dr. Death (1943) - Prisoner (scenes deleted)
- True to Life (1943) - Gabe the Butler (uncredited)
- Pin Up Girl (1944) - Red Cap #1 (uncredited)
- Hail the Conquering Hero (1944) - The Porter (uncredited)
- Out of This World (1945) - Train Porter (uncredited)
- Guest Wife (1945) - Train Porter (uncredited)
- Without Reservations (1946) - Redcap (uncredited)
- Our Hearts Were Growing Up (1946) - Porter (uncredited)
- Suddenly, It's Spring (1947) - Charlie - Black Man in Lobby (uncredited)
- The Sin of Harold Diddlebock (1947) - Bootblack (uncredited)
- Welcome Stranger (1947) - Redcap (uncredited) (final film role)
