= Dewey Robinson =

American actor (1898–1950)

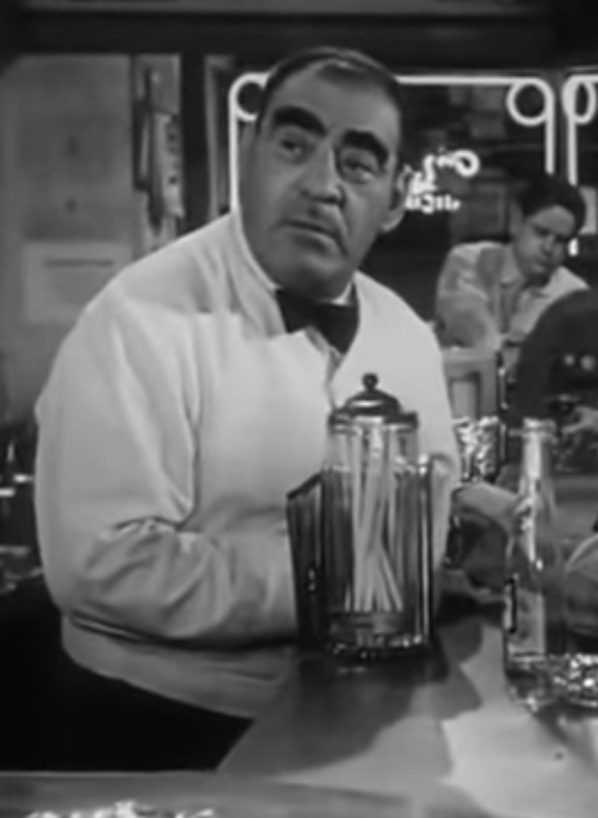
- Robinson in At War with the Army (1950)
- Born: August 17, 1898; New Haven, Connecticut U.S.
- Died: December 11, 1950 (aged 52); Las Vegas, Nevada U.S.
- Occupation: Actor
- Years active: 1931–1950
- Spouse: Lois Wood (m. 1928)

Dewey Robinson (August 17, 1898 – December 11, 1950) was an American film character actor who appeared in more than 250 films made between 1931 and 1952.

== Career ==
Dewey Robinson was born in New Haven, Connecticut, in 1898, and made his Broadway debut in 1922 in the melodrama The Last Warning, which ran for seven months and 238 performances. Several years later, in 1925, he appeared in a comedy, Solid Ivory, his final Broadway production.

In 1931, Robinson, a big, barrel-chested man at 6 ft 1 in (1.85 m) who easily conveyed physical menace, made his first film when he played a waiter in George Cukor's Tarnished Lady, starring Tallulah Bankhead. That performance did not receive screen credit, and this was often the case over Robinson's career, although he was in the billed main cast in Murder on the Campus (1934), Navy Secrets (1939) and There Goes Kelly (1945). Because of his size and physical presence, Robinson worked often during periods when gangster movies were the rage.

Notable early roles for Robinson include a polo-playing hood in Little Giant (1933) starring Edward G. Robinson, a supervisor of slaves in Eddie Cantor's Roman Scandals that same year, and the Ben Turpin short Keystone Hotel in 1935. In the 1940s, Robinson was part of Preston Sturges' unofficial "stock company" of character actors, appearing in eight films written and directed by Sturges. In 1950, near the end of his career, Robinson played a Brooklyn Dodgers fan in The Jackie Robinson Story who progressed from bigotry to exuberant support of Jackie Robinson.

Robinson died in Las Vegas, Nevada, on December 11, 1950, from a heart attack, but because he worked so prolifically, films in which he appeared continued to be seen until 1952, when At Sword's Point, a Musketeer adventure, was released. He was cremated.

== Selected filmography ==
- Tarnished Lady (1931) as Tony the Waiter (uncredited)
- Enemies of the Law (1931) as Tony Catello
- Six Hours to Live (1932)
- The Woman from Monte Carlo (1932)
- Blonde Venus (1932) (uncredited)
- The Big Broadcast (1932)
- The Little Giant (1933)
- She Done Him Wrong (1933)
- Her Forgotten Past (1933)
- A Lady's Profession (1933)
- Soldiers of the Storm (1933)
- Laughing at Life (1933)
- Notorious but Nice (1933)
- Roman Scandals (1933)
- Shadows of Sing Sing (1933)
- Murder on the Campus (1934)
- The Big Shakedown (1934)
- Student Tour (1934) as Huan Lu (uncredited)
- Palooka from Paducah (1935, Short)
- One Run Elmer (1935, Short)
- Pursuit (1935)
- Keystone Hotel (1935, Short)
- A Midsummer Night's Dream (1935)
- Too Tough to Kill (1935)
- Missing Girls (1936)
- All American Chump (1936)
- Slave Ship (1937)
- The 13th Man (1937)
- New Faces of 1937 (1937)
- Marry the Girl (1937)
- The Toast of New York (1937)
- Navy Secrets (1939)
- Sky Bandits (1940)
- The Great McGinty (1940)
- Christmas in July (1940) (uncredited)
- Tin Pan Alley (1940)
- Sullivan's Travels (1941) (uncredited)
- Isle of Missing Men (1942)
- The Palm Beach Story (1942)
- 'Neath Brooklyn Bridge (1942)
- Casablanca (1942) as Bouncer at Rick's (uncredited)
- The Ghost Ship (1943)
- The Woman of the Town (1943)
- Timber Queen (1944)
- Trocadero (1944)
- San Diego, I Love You (1944)
- Hail the Conquering Hero (1944) (uncredited)
- Murder, My Sweet (1944) (uncredited)
- The Great Moment (1944) (uncredited)
- There Goes Kelly (1945)
- Fashion Model (1945)
- The Lady Confesses (1945)
- Stairway to Light (1945 short)
- Black Market Babies (1945)
- Pardon My Past (1945)
- The Bells of St. Mary's (1945) as Pedestrian (uncredited)
- The Michigan Kid (1947)
- Killer Dill (1947)
- The Checkered Coat (1948)
- River Lady (1948)
- The Beautiful Blonde from Bashful Bend (1949) (uncredited)
- Hellfire (1949)
- Buccaneer's Girl (1950)
- The Jackie Robinson Story (1950) (uncredited)
- Father of the Bride (1950) as Moving Man with lamp (uncredited)
- At War with the Army (1950)
- Skipalong Rosenbloom (1951)
- At Sword's Point (1952)
