= Navy Secrets =

1939 film directed by Howard Bretherton

- Directed by: Howard Bretherton
- Written by: Harvey Gates
- Based on: the short story, "Shore Leave" by Steve Fisher
- Produced by: William T. Lackey
- Starring: Fay Wray; Grant Withers; Dewey Robinson
- Cinematography: Harry Neumann
- Edited by: Russell Schoengarth
- Production company: Monogram Pictures
- Release date: February 8, 1939 (US)
- Running time: 60 minutes
- Country: United States
- Language: English

Navy Secrets is a 1939 American espionage film. Directed by Howard Bretherton, the film stars Fay Wray, Grant Withers, and Dewey Robinson. It was released on February 8, 1939. The screenplay by Harvey Gates was based on the short story "Shore Leave" by Steve Fisher, which was originally published in the August 1938 edition of Hearst's International Cosmopolitan.

== Cast list ==
- Fay Wray as Carol Evans, aka Matthews
- Grant Withers as Steve Roberts, aka Fletcher
- Dewey Robinson as Nick Cilatto
- William Von Brincken as Cronjer
- Craig Reynolds as Jimmy
- George Sorel as Slavins
- André Cheron as Joe Benje
- Robert Frazer as Peter
- Joseph Crehan as Daly
- Duke York as Babe
