= A Cup of Coffee =

1931 play by Preston Sturges

A Cup of Coffee is a play written by Preston Sturges in 1931 which Sturges adapted for his 1940 film Christmas in July.

The play was first performed on March 25, 1988, by the Soho Repertory Theatre at the Greenwich House Theatre in New York City, and was produced as part of a retrospective of lost American plays. It was directed by Larry Carpenter and starred Michael Heintzman and Ellen Mareneck.

== Plot ==
=== Act I ===
The story takes place during a warm season in 1931 at the Baxter Coffee Warehouse in New York City. James Ogden MacDonald is a new salesman earning $25 a week. In order to win the $25,000 prize along with a 2-year sales contract to Maxford House Coffee, MacDonald submits a slogan to Maxford House's slogan contest. Just as he is being fired by J. Bloodgood Baxter because he had brought a phonograph to work, a letter arrives informing him that he has won the prize.

=== Act II ===
The Baxters and Whortleberry discuss their plans for rehiring Jimmy while he and Tulip are out to lunch. Jimmy enters with the flash of photographers. J. Bloodgood Baxter convinces Jimmy to drop the 2-year sales contract to Maxford House in exchange for a promotion to sales promotion manager and a raise to $5,000 a year. Jimmy begins sharing some of his ideas with his bosses and they show their approval at his seemingly ridiculous ideas. When they all leave, Tulip stays behind with Jimmy. Jimmy proposes to Tulip and she accepts. Mr. Rasmussen from the Maxford House Company enters and Tulip gets ushered out. He tells Jimmy how, by having so many entrees, it is possible to make a little error, and that it was another by the same name who won.

=== Act III ===
J. Bloodgood Baxter confronts Jimmy about signing the contract for sales promotion manager. Jimmy shows his discomfort, and finally lets it out that he didn't win the contest. The offer is retracted. Jimmy gives each of them a present he had bought when he thought he was rich. Tulip convinces Mr. Ephraim Baxter, the company founder, to exercise his power, and gets Jimmy the contract he was promised. Mr. Rasmussen enters again and declares that it was Jimmy who had won the Maxford House slogan contest.

== Critical response ==
Writing in The New York Times, theater critic Mel Gussow called the play superior to the film adaptation, Gussow said that the play had an "embracing innocence" compared to the movie, and said: "By the time the story reached the screen, it was coated with cynicism, as the author added opportunistic characters and tried to turn an office comedy into a broader social commentary."

== Notes and references ==
- Sturges, Preston. A Cup of Coffee. 1989. Samuel French, Inc.
