= Killer at Large (1936 film) =

1936 film directed by David Selman

- Directed by: David Selman
- Written by: Harold Shumate
- Produced by: Harry Decker
- Starring: Mary Brian; Russell Hardie; George McKay
- Cinematography: Allen G. Siegler
- Edited by: James Sweeney
- Production company: Columbia Pictures
- Distributed by: Columbia Pictures
- Release date: October 1, 1936 (US)
- Running time: 58 minutes
- Country: United States
- Language: English

Killer at Large is a 1936 American mystery film directed by David Selman from a script by Harold Shumate. The film stars Mary Brian, Russell Hardie, Thurston Hall and Henry Brandon as the villain, Mr. Zero. Lon Chaney Jr. appears in a small uncredited role.

== Plot ==
Store detective Linda Allen, who is engaged to marry clerk Tommy Braddock, works in the jewelry department. Mr. Zero (Henry Brandon), a master of disguise is hired to pose as a wax figure in the store's display window, challenging the customers to guess which figure is a real person. The store's safe is robbed of a large cache of jewels and the store manager William Bentley is murdered during the robbery. Linda and Tommy discover the body and are regarded as prime suspects by Police Inspector O'Hara. Linda determines the thief was Mr. Zero and follows him to his waxworks hideout. A young Lon Chaney Jr. appears uncredited in two brief sequences playing one of the two henchmen who guard Mr. Zero's waxworks museum.

== Cast list ==
- Mary Brian as Linda Allen
- Russell Hardie as Tommy Braddock
- George McKay as Sergeant Kelly
- Thurston Hall as Inspector O'Hara
- Henry Brandon as Mr. Zero
- Betty Compson as Kate
- Harry Hayden as William Bentley
- Boyd Irwin as Whitley
- Charles R. Moore as Highpockets
- Harry Bernard as Sexton
- Edward LeSaint as Landlord
- Alma Chester as Old lady
- Rolf Ernest as Messenger
- Lee Shumway as Police captain
- William Arnold as Police operator
- Beatrice Curtis as Shop girl
- Brady Kline as Lieutenant
- James Millican as Hotel clerk
- Charles Dorety as Stunt driver
- Roger Gray as museum guard
- Lon Chaney Jr. as museum guard (uncredited)

(Cast list as per AFI database)
