= Johnny Apollo (film) =

1940 film by Henry Hathaway

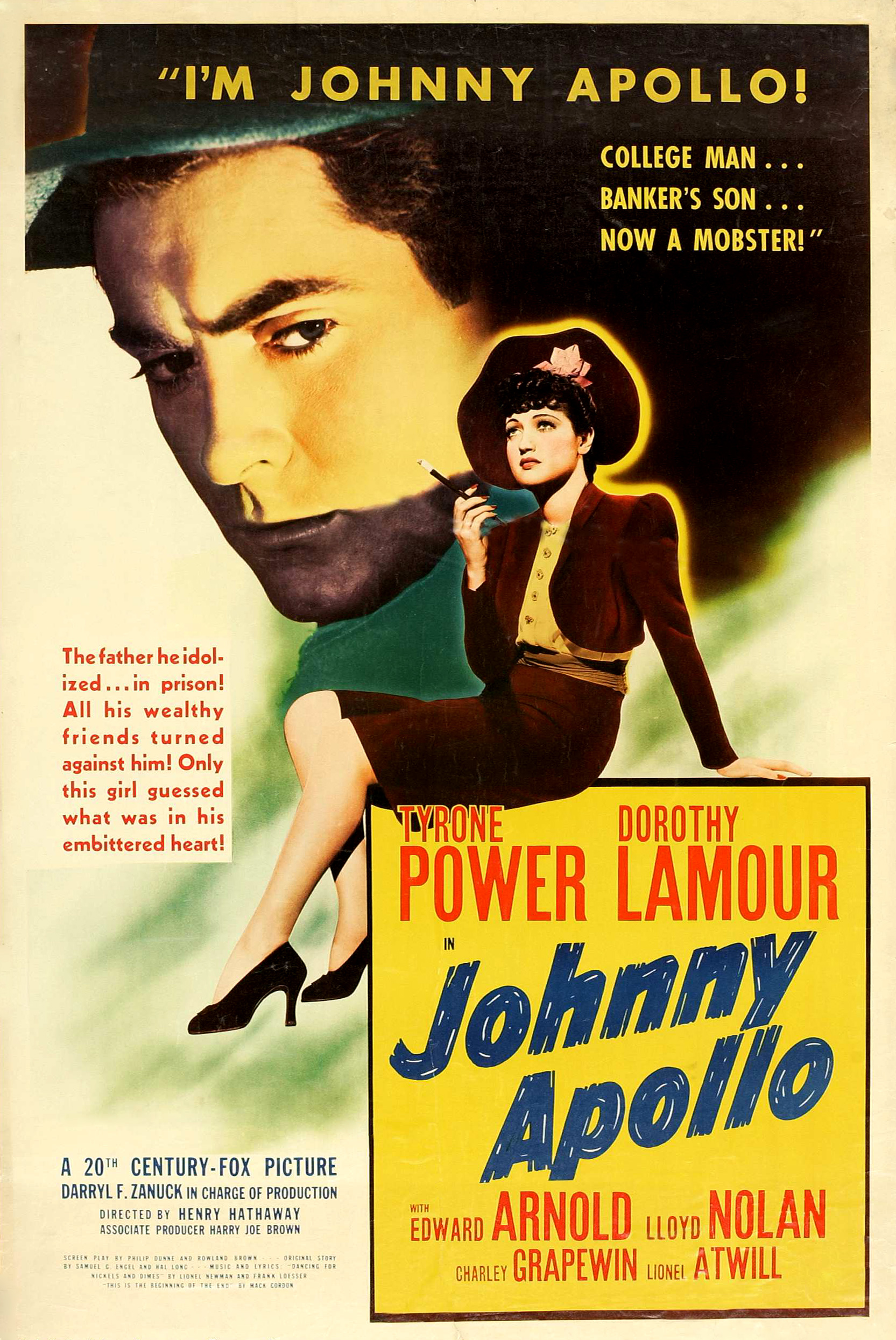
- Movie poster
- Directed by: Henry Hathaway
- Screenplay by: Philip Dunne; Rowland Brown
- Story by: Samuel G. Engel; Hal Long
- Produced by: Harry Joe Brown
- Starring: Tyrone Power; Dorothy Lamour
- Cinematography: Arthur S. Miller (as Arthur Miller)
- Edited by: Robert Bischoff
- Color process: Black and white
- Production company: 20th Century Fox
- Distributed by: 20th Century Fox
- Release date: April 19, 1940
- Running time: 94 minutes
- Country: United States
- Language: English

Johnny Apollo is a 1940 American film noir crime film directed by Henry Hathaway and starring Tyrone Power and Dorothy Lamour.

== Plot ==
Bob Cain, Jr.'s stockbroker father, "Pop" Cain, is sentenced to prison for embezzlement of funds. Up until this time, the two were close, but Bob falls out with Pop over this situation and quits college to look for a job. He is unable to find one due to his father's notoriety. He finds work when he decides to use an alias, but is fired when this is discovered.

Later, gangster Mickey Dwyer, sentenced on the same day as Pop, is granted parole. Bob, disgusted with his father's lawyer, goes to see Dwyer's attorney, an old former judge named Emmett T. Brennan. Waiting outside Brennan's apartment, Bob, calling himself Johnny, meets the gangster's girlfriend, Lucky Dubarry. They chat and she is immediately attracted to him. Brennan arrives. Lucky pretends she knows Bob, and he, not wanting to disclose his identify at all, when asked by Brennan tells them both his full name is Johnny Apollo (taking the surname from the neon sign marquee visible through the window on the dance-club across the street). Lucky leaves, and Bob inquires of Brennan how to get Pop paroled. With money, he is told.

Dwyer arrives and asks about Johnny. Brennan 'vouches' for him. Dwyer, not wanting to be anywhere near police, asks Bob to go bail out one of his crew, offering a hundred dollars to Bob. Bob accepts the task.

Soon, Dwyer offers Apollo employment. Apollo decides to work for the gangster to raise the dough he needs. They commit various criminal acts (not shown). After accumulating much money, Bob visits his father in prison. They reconcile, and Bob talks of a forthcoming parole, so Pop is happy. But after he leaves, his father discovers from a guard that his son, 'Johnny Apollo', is now a criminal, and a disgusted Pop Cain wants nothing to do with him.

Brennan attempts to make a deal for Dwyer, offering the district attorney evidence on all of his crew, if all pending charges against Dwyer are dropped. The D.A. does not accept, but counteroffers: he will drop all pending charges against Apollo, in exchange for evidence on Dwyer. Brennan accepts, knowing Apollo is essentially a good man, and that Lucky is in love with him. He hands over damning evidence on Dwyer.

In retaliation, Dwyer murders Brennan. Bob, unaware and not believing Dwyer could murder the judge, with whom he was good friends, alibis Dwyer. Both he and Dwyer are sent to prison, using Brennan's evidence, the D.A. ignoring the deal he had with Brennan, due to Bob's recalcitrant attitude. A jailbreak is set in motion, but Lucky is able to sneak word of it to Pop, who prevents his son from getting involved. An angry Dwyer shoots Pop and knocks out Bob, but is then killed by guards.

Bob is blamed and faces a longer sentence, perhaps even execution. Pop recovers, however, and alibis his son. Bob serves his term, and on release finds his father waiting for him, along with Lucky.

== Cast ==
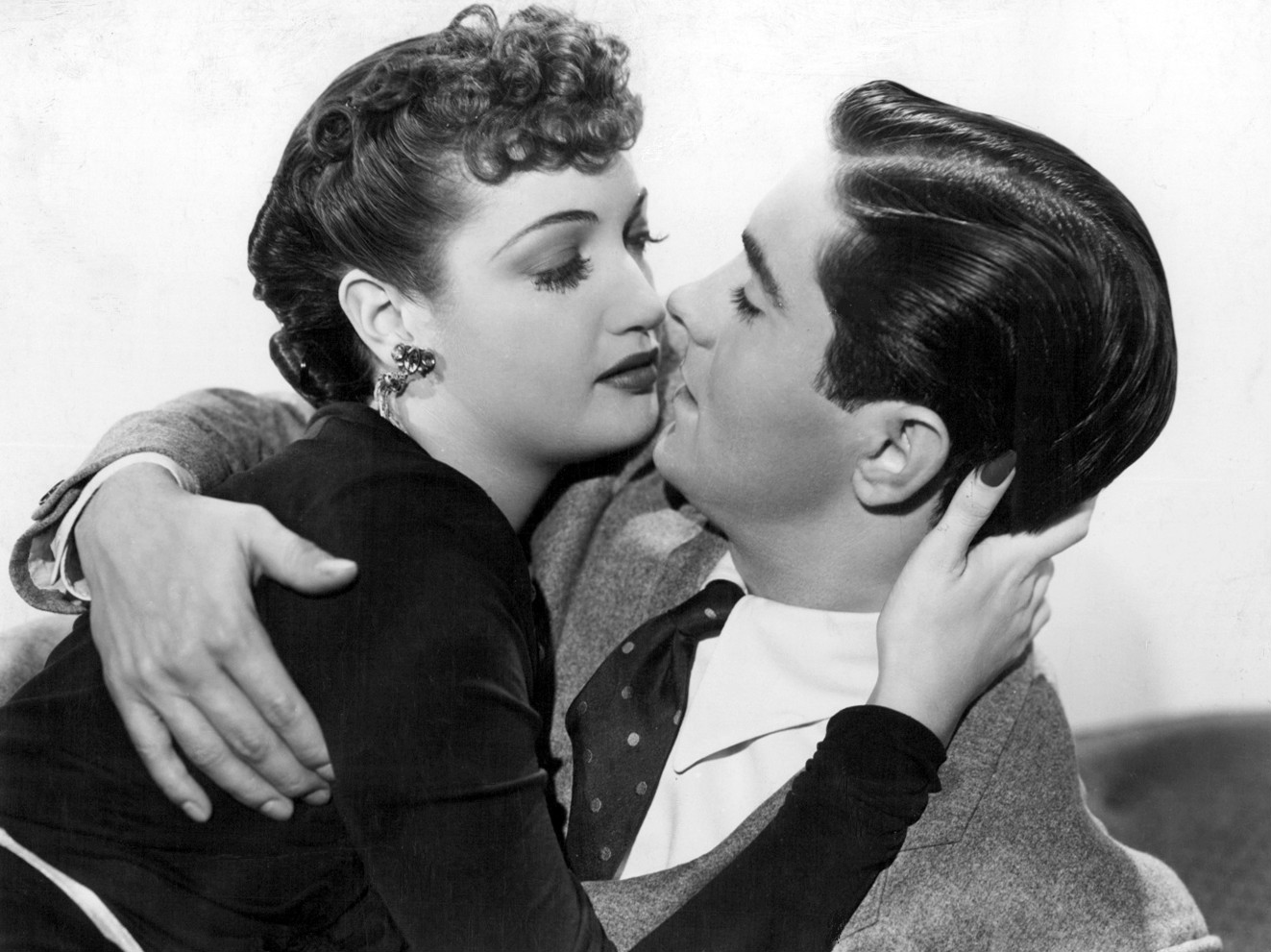
Scene from the film

- Tyrone Power as Bob Cain
- Dorothy Lamour as 'Lucky' Dubarry
- Edward Arnold as Robert Cain Sr.
- Lloyd Nolan as Mickey Dwyer
- Charley Grapewin as Judge Emmett T. Brennan
- Lionel Atwill as Jim McLaughlin
- Marc Lawrence as Bates
- Jonathan Hale as Dr. Brown
- Harry Rosenthal as Piano Player
- Russell Hicks as District Attorney
- Fuzzy Knight as Cellmate
- Charles Lane as Assistant District Attorney
- Selmer Jackson as Warden (as Selmar Jackson)
- Charles Trowbridge as Judge
- John Hamilton as Judge
- William Pawley as Paul
- Eric Wilton as Butler
- Gary Breckner as Announcer
- Harry Tyler as Trusty
- George Irving as Mr. Ives
- Eddie Marr as Harry - Henchman
- Anthony Caruso as Joe - Henchman
- Stanley Andrews as Welfare Secretary
- Wally Albright as Office Boy

== Production ==
Lamour sings several songs in the film, including the 1938 hit song "They Say" by Edward Heyman, Paul Mann and Stephen Weiss. Lamour also dances in nightclub scenes.

== Adaptations ==
The movie was adapted for Australian radio in 1942 with Ron Randell.
