= Birth of the Blues =

1941 film by Victor Schertzinger

- Film poster
- Directed by: Victor Schertzinger
- Written by: Harry Tugend; Walter DeLeon; Erwin S. Gelsey; Wilkie C. Mahoney
- Produced by: Monta Bell
- Starring: Bing Crosby; Mary Martin; Brian Donlevy
- Cinematography: William C. Mellor
- Edited by: Paul Weatherwax
- Music by: Robert Emmett Dolan
- Production company: Paramount Pictures
- Distributed by: Paramount Pictures
- Release date: November 7, 1941
- Running time: 84 minutes
- Country: United States
- Language: English

Birth of the Blues is a 1941 American musical film directed by Victor Schertzinger and starring Bing Crosby, Mary Martin and Brian Donlevy.

The plot loosely follows the origins and breakthrough success of the Original Dixieland Jass Band in New Orleans. It was well-received by critics on its release. It was nominated for an Academy Award for Best Original Score. However, many of the songs, such as "St. Louis Blues" by W. C. Handy and "Tiger Rag" by The Original Dixieland Jazz Band, were not new.

== Plot ==
Although he is only twelve, Jeff Lambert is a very talented clarinetist, and although the boy's father has spent a small fortune to have Jeff taught the fundamentals of classical clarinet, the lad prefers to spend his time in New Orleans with a group of black jazz men who perform in a dive on Bourbon Street. As the boy grows into manhood, his love for jazz intensifies, and he forms his own group, much to the chagrin of his aging father.

Moving ahead, we find Jeff (Crosby) in his late twenties, and he and his boys have been unable to secure a job at any of the classier New Orleans cabarets and have been forced to limit their playing to street corners and to one-night stands in some of the dingier nightclubs. When his lead trombone player asks Jeff why the band can't seem to get anywhere, Jeff replies that he thinks the main problem is that the group lacks a hot trumpet player. He begins to search throughout New Orleans in the hope of finding a trumpet man who can fill the bill. He finds one in a local jail and promises to bail the fellow out as soon as he can raise the money. This he does, and the trumpet player, named Memphis (Brian Donlevy), agrees to become a member of Jeff's band.

At the same time, Jeff notices a young lady called Betty Lou (Mary Martin) being overcharged by a horse-cab driver. He takes pity on her and her Aunt Phoebe (Carolyn Lee) and he invites them to stay with him. Memphis is attracted to Betty Lou and he gets her a job at a club owned by Blackie (J. Carrol Naish) and she agrees to the job if Blackie will take on Jeff's band and he reluctantly agrees to do so.

With a great trumpet player, Jeff's band becomes the most popular jazz band on Bourbon Street. All goes well until they find out that the owner of the club, Blackie is a racketeer who uses his night spot only as a convenient front for his criminal interests. Jeff and the boys decide to leave Blackie's club and go on to other things, but when they tell Blackie of their plans, the gangster threatens to kill them one by one. Jeff takes a swing at Blackie, which causes a violent saloon brawl between Blackie and his gang and Jeff and his boys. During the fight, Jeff's good friend Louey (Eddie "Rochester" Anderson) is injured when he is cracked over the head with a bottle. When the riot is over, Jeff and the boys take the unconscious Louey home to his wife, Ruby (Ruby Elzy). As she tearfully bemoans her husband's injury, Jeff and the band play a moving musical tribute to their fallen comrade. Slowly Louey regains consciousness.

A few weeks later, Jeff and his band have still another unpleasant run-in with Blackie. This time, the gangster is accidentally killed by one of his own henchmen, leaving Jeff, Betty Lou, and the band to move on to better things.

== Cast ==
- Bing Crosby as Jeff Lambert
- Mary Martin as Betty Lou Cobb
- Brian Donlevy as Memphis
- Carolyn Lee as Aunt Phoebe Cobb
- Eddie "Rochester" Anderson as Louey
- J. Carrol Naish as Blackie
- Warren Hymer as Limpy
- Horace McMahon as Wolf
- Ruby Elzy as Ruby
- Jack Teagarden as Pepper
- Danny Beck as Deek
- Harry Barris as Suds
- Perry Botkin Sr. as Leo
- Minor Watson as Henri Lambert
- Harry Rosenthal as Piano Player
- Donald Kerr as Skeeter, Barbershop Musician
- Barbara Pepper as Maizie
- Cecil Kellaway as Granet

== Production credits ==
- Victor Schertzinger - director
- Monta Bell - associate producer
- Harry Tugend - screenplay, story
- Walter DeLeon - screenplay
- Robert Emmett Dolan - musical supervision and direction
- Arthur Franklin - musical adviser
- William C. Mellor - director of photography
- Hans Dreier - art direction
- Ernst Fegté - art direction
- Paul Weatherwax - editor
- Edith Head - costumes
- Earl Hayman - sound recording
- John Cope - sound recording

== Reception ==
The film was placed at No. 13 in the list of top-grossing movies for 1941 in the USA.

The reviews were positive with Bosley Crowther of The New York Times commenting: "The Paramount has got a nice picture to greet the holidays... On the basis of story alone, 'Birth of the Blues' rates a less-than-passing grade. But as a series of illustrated jam sessions and nifty presentations of songs and jokes it is as pleasant an hour-and-a-half killer as the musically inclined could wish. Not only does feckless Bing Crosby play the clarinetist in his best unpremeditated vein, but he also has Mary Martin, Brian Donlevy, Eddie (Rochester) Anderson and Jack Teagarden with his orchestra to abet him. And although they give the impression of improvising, more or less, as they go, Director Victor Schertzinger has given to their sauntering a very smooth, easy-going pace. . . For sweet and fancy singing that makes your muscles twitch, there is Mr. Crosby and Miss Martin doing truly delightful things with 'Wait Till the Sun Shines, Nellie' and a new number, 'The Waiter, the Porter and the Upstairs Maid.' And for dipping deep on the low chords, you can’t ask for anything more than Mr. Crosby’s ‘Melancholy Baby’ and those mournful ‘St. Louis Blues,’ sung by one Ruby Elzy, with the Teagarden band moaning behind. Obviously, this little picture is not the ultimate saga of early jazz. But it begins to perceive the possibilities. As the 'cats' say, it takes more than it leaves."

Variety summed it up saying: "‘Birth of the Blues’ is Bing Crosby’s best filmusical to date. It’ll sing plenty of black ink at the b. o... Crosby bings personally with solo vocals, ensemble clowning and kidding-on-the-square crooning, the most legit being ‘Melancholy Baby’ (with Carolyn Lee): ‘By the Light of the Silvery Moon’ in a tiptop illustrated song slide routine in one of those early picture-houses: and thematically does ‘Birth of the Blues’ as the credits unreel..."

== Soundtrack ==
- "The Birth of the Blues" sung by Bing Crosby
- "At a Georgia Camp Meeting" (Kerry Mills) played by negro band
- "St. James Infirmary" featured by Jack Teagarden Orchestra and a few parody lines by Bing Crosby
- "The Memphis Blues" sung by Bing Crosby with Jack Teagarden Orchestra.
- "By the Light of the Silvery Moon" sung by Bing Crosby
- "Tiger Rag" featured by Jack Teagarden Orchestra
- "Waiting at the Church" sung by Mary Martin
- "Cuddle up a Little Closer" sung by Mary Martin
- "Wait 'Till the Sun Shines, Nellie" sung by Bing Crosby and Mary Martin
- "The Trick to the Blues" sung by Eddie Anderson
- "After the Ball" played by orchestra
- "Shine" featured by Jack Teagarden Orchestra
- "My Melancholy Baby" sung by Bing Crosby
- "The Waiter and the Porter and the Upstairs Maid" (Johnny Mercer) sung by Bing Crosby, Mary Martin and Jack Teagarden
- "St. Louis Blues" sung by Bing Crosby, Ruby Elzy and choir.

Bing Crosby recorded a number of the songs for Decca Records. "The Waiter and the Porter and the Upstairs Maid" charted briefly in the No. 23 position. Crosby's songs were also included in the Bing's Hollywood series.

== Bibliography ==
- Gabbard, Krin. Jammin' at the Margins: Jazz and the American Cinema. University of Chicago Press, 1996.
- Davis, Ronald L. Mary Martin: Broadway Legend. University of Oklahoma Press, 2008.
