= The Great McGinty =

1940 film by Preston Sturges

- UK theatrical poster
- Directed by: Preston Sturges
- Written by: Preston Sturges
- Produced by: Paul Jones; Buddy G. DeSylva (uncredited)
- Starring: Brian Donlevy; Muriel Angelus; Akim Tamiroff
- Cinematography: William C. Mellor
- Edited by: Hugh Bennett
- Music by: Frederick Hollander; John Leipold (uncredited)
- Production company: Paramount Pictures
- Distributed by: Paramount Pictures
- Release dates: August 15, 1940 (New York City); August 23, 1940 (U.S.)
- Running time: 83 minutes
- Country: United States
- Language: English
- Budget: $350,000

The Great McGinty is a 1940 American political satire comedy film written and directed by Preston Sturges, starring Brian Donlevy and Akim Tamiroff and featuring William Demarest and (in her final screen appearance) Muriel Angelus. It was Sturges's first film as a director; he sold the story to Paramount Pictures for just $10 on condition he direct the film. Sturges received an Oscar for Best Original Screenplay.

For the U.K. release, the film was retitled Down Went McGinty, alluding to the 1889 song.

== Plot ==
Dan McGinty, a bartender in a banana republic, recounts his rise and fall to the bar's dancing girl and a suicidal American customer, Tommy. The customer was a trusted bank employee who can no longer return to the United States and his family because he is wanted by the law after falling to temptation and stealing from the bank. McGinty is in a similar situation, but in his case it is due to "one crazy minute" of honesty rather than one of dishonesty. In a long flashback, he explains.

McGinty's career begins when he is a tramp who, offered $2 to vote under a false name in a rigged mayoral election, does it thirty-seven times at different precincts. This impresses a local political boss, and although they sometimes almost come to blows with each other, McGinty becomes first one of the boss's enforcers and then his political protégé. During a public campaign for political reform, the boss, who controls all the political parties in the city, decides to have McGinty elected mayor as a "reform" candidate. He says a credible candidate must be married - but McGinty has no one he wants to marry. His secretary then proposes a marriage of convenience, which he accepts. Elected mayor, he continues the political corruption established by the boss, rationalizing that the public still benefits from public works no matter who bribes their way into profiting from them. But then he and his more idealistic wife actually fall in love. He begins to take her views on public service seriously, but says he is not powerful enough to act against the boss in any case.

Five years later, the boss decides McGinty should be governor of the state, and McGinty is duly elected. Now McGinty feels he is powerful enough and on his inauguration day he tells the boss that they're through with each other. The boss says that if he goes down then he'll take McGinty with him by revealing his part in the corruption. He then becomes angry enough to fire a gun at McGinty inside the governor's mansion, ensuring his prompt arrest.

McGinty and the boss find themselves in adjacent jail cells, from which the boss arranges an escape for them both. The flashback ends with McGinty providing for his wife and her children by telling her by phone about money he has hidden. We finally see that the former political boss is still his boss at the bar, and that they are still given to violent disagreements.

== Cast ==
- Brian Donlevy as Daniel McGinty
- Muriel Angelus as Catherine McGinty
- Akim Tamiroff as The Boss
- Allyn Joslyn as George
- William Demarest as Skeeters, the political "fixer."
- Louis Jean Heydt as Thompson ("Tommy")
- Harry Rosenthal as Louie
- Arthur Hoyt as Mayor Wilfred T. Tillinghast
- Libby Taylor as Bessy
- Thurston Hall as Mr. Maxwell
- Steffi Duna as The Dancing Girl
- Joyce Arleen as Mary, Catherine's girl, age 6

Cast notes:

- Credited as “McGinty and the Boss”, Donlevy and Tamiroff reprised their roles in Sturges's 1944 comedy The Miracle of Morgan's Creek, which takes place during McGinty's term as governor.
- This was the first film directed by Preston Sturges, and in it he used many of the actors who became part of his unofficial "stock company", a troupe of character actors within the studio system. Appearing in McGinty are: George Anderson, Jimmy Conlin, William Demarest, Byron Foulger, Harry Hayden, Esther Howard, Arthur Hoyt, George Melford, Charles R. Moore, Frank Moran, Emory Parnell, Victor Potel, Dewey Robinson, Harry Rosenthal and Robert Warwick.
- This was the third film written by Preston Sturges that William Demarest appeared in, after Diamond Jim (1935) and Easy Living (1937), and he would go on to do seven others (see note).
- Jo Ann Sayers was originally scheduled to play Catherine McGinty, and was borrowed from MGM, but she was not found to be satisfactory and was replaced.
- Tamiroff's malaprop-laced performance inspired the cartoon character Boris Badenov, on The Rocky and Bullwinkle Show. Sturges used Tamiroff's character to skewer one of Hollywood's hoariest practices when he repeatedly pleads, "Don't make me say everything twice, will you?"
- Heydt had starred in the Broadway production of Sturges's first big success, Strictly Dishonorable (1929).

== Production ==
The Great McGinty had numerous working titles: "The Story of a Man", "The Vagrant", "The Mantle of Dignity", "The Biography of a Bum", and "Down Went McGinty", (which was used for the film's release in the U.K). Sturges had written the original story, "The Story of a Man", in 1933 with Spencer Tracy in mind. It has been theorized that Sturges was inspired by the career of William Sulzer, who was impeached and removed from office as governor of New York.

After trying to sell the story to Universal in 1935, and the Saturday Evening Post in 1938 under the title Biography of a Bum, Sturges finally sold it to Paramount on August 19, 1939, for $10 on the condition that he be allowed to direct it. Paramount agreed, and provided Sturges a budget of $350,000, a three-week shooting schedule, and inexpensive stars to work with.

Production on the film was delayed to allow Akim Tamiroff to do The Way of All Flesh, but it began on December 15, 1939. Sturges contracted pneumonia during filming, and required a nurse to attend to him on the set. Production stopped on January 25, 1940, with one day's shooting left to do, which was accomplished on April 15, after the first cut of the film had already been made.

== Release ==
The Great McGinty premiered in New York City on August 15, 1940, and was generally released on August 23. The movie was not a large hit but was profitable.

It was released on video in the U.S. on April 7, 1988, and re-released on June 30, 1993.

On the review aggregator website Rotten Tomatoes, 100% of 27 critics' reviews are positive, with an average rating of 7.8/10.

== Adaptations ==
Brian Donlevy appeared in a Philip Morris Playhouse radio adaptation January 23, 1942, on the CBS radio network, the August 27, 1945 episode of The Screen Guild Theater and in the April 20, 1946 episode of Academy Award Theater. It was also adapted to the October 12, 1947 episode of the Ford Theatre and a May 11, 1952 Screen Guild Theater starring Broderick Crawford. Donlevy also appeared in a television adaptation on Lux Video Theatre, broadcast on 28 April 1955, with Thomas Gomez and Jesse White. The director was Earl Eby and Preston Sturges' screenplay was adapted by S.H. Barnett.

Paramount considered a remake of the film starring Bing Crosby in 1950, and one in 1954 with Bob Hope, but decided against both.

== Awards and honors ==
Preston Sturges won the 1940 Academy Award for "Best Original Screenplay" for The Great McGinty, which was named as one of the ten best films of 1940 by both The New York Times and Film Daily.

The film is recognized by American Film Institute in these lists:

- 2005: AFI's 100 Years...100 Movie Quotes:
  - The Politician: "If it weren't for graft, you'd get a very low type of people in politics." – Nominated
