= I Married a Witch =

1942 film by René Clair

- Theatrical release poster
- Directed by: René Clair
- Screenplay by: Robert Pirosh; Marc Connelly
- Based on: The Passionate Witch; 1941 novel by Thorne Smith and Norman H. Matson
- Produced by: René Clair
- Starring: Fredric March; Veronica Lake; Robert Benchley; Susan Hayward; Cecil Kellaway
- Cinematography: Ted Tetzlaff
- Edited by: Eda Warren
- Music by: Roy Webb
- Production companies: Paramount Pictures; Cinema Guild Productions
- Distributed by: United Artists
- Release date: October 30, 1942
- Running time: 77 minutes
- Country: United States
- Language: English
- Box office: $1.1 million (US rentals)

I Married a Witch is a 1942 American romantic screwball comedy fantasy film produced and directed by René Clair from a screenplay by Robert Pirosh and Marc Connelly. The film stars Veronica Lake as the titular witch whose plan for revenge goes comically awry, with Fredric March as her foil. The film also features Robert Benchley, Susan Hayward, and Cecil Kellaway. The screenplay by Robert Pirosh and Marc Connelly and uncredited other writers, including Dalton Trumbo, is based on the novel The Passionate Witch by Thorne Smith, who died before he could finish it; it was completed by Norman H. Matson and published in 1941.

== Plot ==
Two witches in colonial Salem, Jennifer and her father Daniel, are burned at the stake after being denounced by Puritan Jonathan Wooley. Their ashes are buried beneath a tree to imprison their evil spirits. In revenge, Jennifer curses Wooley and his male descendants, dooming them always to marry the wrong woman.

Centuries pass. Generation after generation, Wooley men marry shrewish women. Finally, in 1942, lightning splits the tree, freeing the spirits of Jennifer and Daniel. They discover Wallace Wooley, living nearby and running for governor, on the eve of marrying the spoiled Estelle Masterson, daughter of newspaper publisher J. B. Masterson, Wooley's chief political backer.

Jennifer persuades Daniel to conjure a human body for her with which to torment Wallace. Daniel needs fire to perform this spell, so he burns down the Pilgrim Hotel. This serves a dual purpose, as Jennifer uses the emergency to trap Wallace into rescuing her from the burning building.

Jennifer tries hard to seduce Wallace without magic. Even though he is attracted to her, he refuses to call off his marriage. Jennifer concocts a love potion, but the scheme goes awry when a painting falls on her, knocking her out. Wallace revives her by giving her the very drink she had intended for him.

Daniel conjures himself a body, then he and Jennifer crash the wedding, though they are at cross purposes. Daniel hates all Wooleys and tries to prevent his daughter from helping one of them. His attempts at interference land him in jail, too drunk to remember the spell to turn Wallace into a frog. Meanwhile, bride-to-be Estelle finds the couple embracing, and the wedding is called off. Outraged, Estelle's father promises to denounce Wallace Wooley in all his newspapers. Wallace finally admits he loves Jennifer, and they elope.

Jennifer then casts a spell on all the voters and ballots using witchcraft to fix the election – even Wallace's opponent ends up voting for Wallace, making the vote unanimous. The election's outcome convinces Wallace his new wife is indeed a witch. Daniel warns his daughter that she must be punished for revealing her true nature to a mortal, and takes away her magical powers.

In a panic, Jennifer interrupts Wallace's victory speech, imploring him to help her escape. Unfortunately, the taxi they get in to get away is driven by Daniel. He takes the taxi airborne only to crash it into the original tree in which he was trapped. At the stroke of midnight, Wallace is left with Jennifer's lifeless body, while two plumes of smoke watch. Before they return to the tree, Jennifer asks to watch Wallace's torment. While Daniel gloats, Jennifer reclaims her body, explaining to Wallace, "Love is stronger than witchcraft." She quickly puts the cork into the bottle of liquor her father is hiding in, keeping him drunk and powerless.

Years later, Wallace and Jennifer have children. Margaret, the housekeeper, enters to complain about their young daughter, who enters pretending to ride a broom. Jennifer tells her husband, "I'm afraid we're going to have trouble with her someday."

== Cast ==
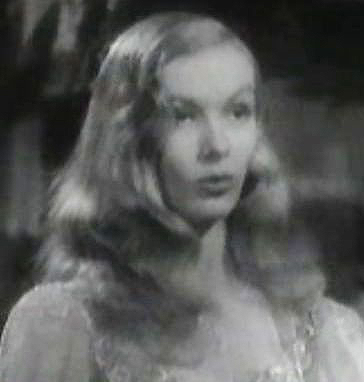
Veronica Lake

- Fredric March as Jonathan Wooley, Nathaniel Wooley, Samuel Wooley, and principally Wallace Wooley
- Veronica Lake as Jennifer Wooley
- Cecil Kellaway as Daniel
- Robert Benchley as Dr. Dudley White
- Susan Hayward as Estelle Masterson
- Elizabeth Patterson as Margaret
- Eily Malyon as Tabitha Wooley
- Robert Warwick as J.B. Masterson
- Robert Greig as town crier
- Mary Field as Nancy Wooley
- Nora Cecil as Harriet Wooley
- Viola Moore as Martha
- Helen St. Rayner as singer at wedding
- Aldrich Bowker as justice of the peace
- Wade Boteler as policeman (uncredited)
- Ann Carter as Jennifer Wooley [daughter] (uncredited)
- Robert Homans as fire chief (uncredited)

Cast notes:

- Preston Sturges served as associate producer on this film, until he left due to artistic differences with the director, and some regular members of his unofficial "stock company" of character actors appear in it, including Al Bridge, Chester Conklin, Florence Gill, Bess Flowers, Robert Greig, Esther Howard, Charles R. Moore, and Emory Parnell.

== Production ==
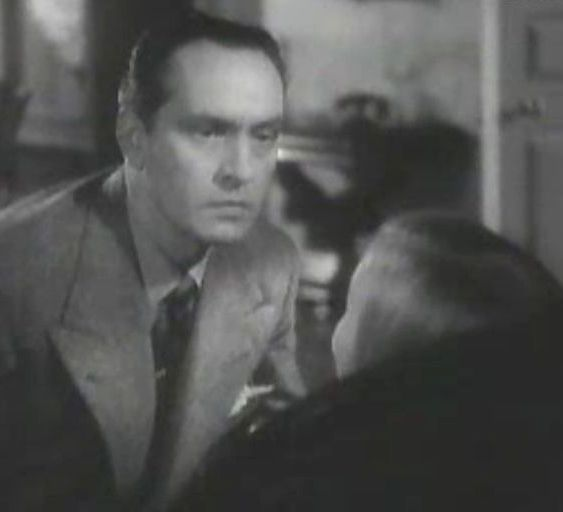
Fredric March

The novel upon which the film is based was mainly written by Thorne Smith, who died in 1934. His papers included an unfinished novel entitled The Passionate Witch. Then three-quarters complete, its resolution was written by his friend Norman Matson and was published in July 1941. The book became a best seller.

I Married a Witch was produced by Paramount Pictures, and had the working title of He Married a Witch. Director René Clair was looking for a new project after his first American film, The Flame of New Orleans (1941). His agent sent him a copy of The Passionate Witch. Clair took it to Preston Sturges, then in favor at Paramount, who convinced Clair and the studio that it would be a good vehicle for Veronica Lake, with Sturges as producer. According to Clair, "Paramount had been trying to find something right for Veronica Lake, who had been receiving lots of publicity partly because of her beautiful hair. They didn't want an ordinary role for her, and Preston convinced them that I Married a Witch was just what they needed. That's what did it: Veronica Lake got me that job; she was a lot more important to Paramount than I was, believe me. Of course when I went to work on the picture, Preston was busy directing something else, so he didn't know exactly what was happening either."

Paramount bought the film rights in October 1941. Dalton Trumbo was signed to write the script.

Robert Pirosh was called in to work on the script with Trumbo. Trumbo left the project after clashing with Sturges. Sturges himself left the film before it was completed due to artistic differences with director René Clair, and did not want to receive a screen credit. Clair, who also contributed to the dialogue, apparently worked closely with writer Robert Pirosh. Clair said Marc Connell "collaborated more as an advisor than as an actual writer." He also said:

Bob Pirosh and I worked very well together. We got out what we considered to be a reasonable script for I Married a Witch. But the front office didn't like everything we'd done, so we changed the script considerably. After a lot of rewriting, we finally got an approval from them and started shooting. Of course, neither of us intended to shoot the approved script exactly as it had been submitted, so we would sometimes sit up late rewriting the script for the next day's shooting.

Joel McCrea was originally announced to play the male lead in December 1941. However, by February in 1942, he withdrew from the project; he later said this was because he did not want to work with Veronica Lake again, after not getting along with her on Sullivan's Travels. McCrea's refusal to make the film caused production to be postponed. This enabled Lake to appear in The Glass Key (1942).

March and Lake also had problems, beginning with March's pre-production comment that Lake was "a brainless little blonde sexpot, void of any acting ability", to which Lake retaliated by calling March a "pompous poseur". Things did not get much better during filming. Lake was prone to playing practical jokes on March, like hiding a 40-pound weight under her dress for a scene in which March had to carry her, or pushing her foot repeatedly into his groin during the filming of a from-the-waist-up shot.

Patricia Morison was considered for the role of Estelle, and Walter Abel for Dudley. Margaret Hayes was considered for the film as well, and was screentested.

The film was shot over five weeks. Clair said, "I simply shot exactly what I knew I would need, whereas some directors at that time were shooting everything they could conceivably turn their lens on. I was told that few of them ever came near a cutting room."

== Release ==
I Married a Witch was one of a number of films sold by Paramount to United Artists (UA) in September 1942, when UA did not have enough films to meet its commitments and Paramount had a surplus. It was released by UA on October 30 that year.

At the time of the film's release, Char, a film critic from Variety wrote, "Neither March nor Miss Lake impresses very importantly, while Robert Benchley has not been well equipped with material designed to afford comic relief" and "rather draggy entertainment".

At the time of the film's release, a film critic from The Chicago Tribune wrote, "I Married a Witch is bizarre but beguiling. Under Rene Clair's delicately preposterous direction it unreels a story of modern witchcraft, the like of which has not been seen on any screen." The reviewer also called Veronica Lake's performance "delightfully outrageous and very funny."

Diabolique Magazine agreed, eight decades later:

This is wickedly funny, an absolute delight – due greatly to Lake who was never more alluring, strutting around in men's pajamas, casting spells, chasing after March and causing devilry. This was her only fantasy movie and it beggars belief that Paramount never tried her again in that genre – she had a vaguely 'otherworld' appearance (that hair, that voice) perfect for it.

The film was released on VHS by Warner Home Video in the United States on July 18, 1990. It was released on DVD and Blu-ray by The Criterion Collection in the U.S. on October 8, 2013.

== Awards and honors ==
The music score for I Married a Witch, composed by Roy Webb, was nominated for Best Original Score at the 15th Academy Awards, but lost out to the score for Now, Voyager.

== See also ==
- List of films about witchcraft
