= Harry Hayden =

Canadian-American actor (1882–1955)

- Born: 8 November 1882; Nova Scotia, Canada
- Died: 24 July 1955 (aged 72); West Los Angeles, California, U.S.
- Occupation: Actor
- Years active: 1936–1955
- Spouse: Lela Bliss (m. 1924; died 1955)
- Children: 2

Harry Hayden (8 November 1882 – 24 July 1955) was a Canadian-American actor. He was a highly prolific actor, with more than 280 screen credits.

== Career ==
Hayden was born in Nova Scotia, Canada, on 8 November 1882. He is best known to modern audiences as middle-aged, greying at the temples, and wearing glasses, assaying small-town store proprietors, hotel managers, city attorneys, bankers and minor bureaucrats, often warm-hearted, but frequently officious or snooping.

In the early 1920s Hayden was recruited from David Belasco's The Boomerang to perform in vaudeville. He and his company headed the bill with The Love Game in 1922.

Hayden worked both onstage and in films, and with his wife, actress Lela Bliss, to whom he was married from 1924 until his death, he ran the Bliss-Hayden miniature theatre in Beverly Hills, whose alumni include Veronica Lake, Doris Day, Debbie Reynolds, and Marilyn Monroe. He staged and produced the Broadway play Thirsty Soil, which ran for 13 performances in February 1937.

Hayden began appearing in films in 1936, when he was seen in Foolproof, a crime drama short, and worked consistently and steadily until 1954. At the peak of his career in the late 1930s and early 1940s, he appeared in a dozen or two films a year. Often his work went uncredited, but he was notable in Laurel and Hardy's Saps at Sea in 1940 as Mr. Sharp, the horn factory owner, and as Farley Granger's boss in 1951's O. Henry's Full House. In the 1940s, Hayden was part of Preston Sturges' unofficial "stock company" of supporting and character actors, appearing in six films written and directed by Sturges.

Hayden did a handful of episodic television shows from 1951 to 1955. In 1952, he played Stephen Wilson, the father of Margie's boyfriend in the episode "Vern's Chums", in "My Little Margie", he also had a recurring role as "Harry Johnson" on The Stu Erwin Show, also known as The Trouble With Father, although he went uncredited when the show went to syndication. In 1954, he appeared in his final film, The Desperado.

== Personal life ==
Hayden was married to actress Lela Bliss, and they had a son, Don Hayden. He died on 24 July 1955 in West Los Angeles, California, at the age of 71.

== Partial filmography ==
- I Married a Doctor (1936)
- Killer at Large (1936)
- Two Against the World (1936) as Dr. Martin Leavenworth
- Artists and Models (1937)
- Black Legion (1937) as Jones
- I'll Give a Million (1938)
- Saleslady (1938)
- Wife, Husband and Friend (1939)
- Rose of Washington Square (1939)
- The Rains Came (1939)
- Should a Girl Marry? (1939)
- Barricade (1939)
- Swanee River (1939)
- He Married His Wife (1940)
- Saps at Sea (1940) (uncredited)
- Lillian Russell (1940)
- Christmas in July (1940) (uncredited)
- A Man Betrayed (1941)
- Remember the Day (1941)
- Rings on Her Fingers (1942)
- The Lone Star Ranger (1942)
- Yankee Doodle Dandy (1942) as Dr. Lewellyn (uncredited)
- The Magnificent Dope (1942)
- Joan of Ozark (1942)
- Tales of Manhattan (1942)
- Hello, Frisco, Hello (1943) as Burkham
- She Has What It Takes (1943) as Mr. Jason
- The Unknown Guest (1943) as George Nadroy
- The Big Noise (1944)
- Hail the Conquering Hero (1944)
- Two Sisters from Boston (1946)
- The Killers (1946) (uncredited)
- Till the Clouds Roll By (1946)
- Millie's Daughter (1947) (uncredited)
- Variety Girl (1947)
- Merton of the Movies (1947)
- The Dude Goes West (1948)
- The Velvet Touch (1948)
- Good Sam (1948)
- Every Girl Should Be Married (1948)
- Abbott and Costello Meet the Killer, Boris Karloff (1949)
- Intruder in the Dust (1949)
- Gun Crazy (1950)
- The Traveling Saleswoman (1950)
- Union Station (1950)
- Double Dynamite (1951)
- Carrie (1952)
- Army Bound (1952)
- O. Henry's Full House (1952)
