= The Palm Beach Story =

1942 film by Preston Sturges

- Theatrical release poster
- Directed by: Preston Sturges
- Written by: Preston Sturges
- Produced by: Buddy G. DeSylva (uncredited)
- Starring: Claudette Colbert; Joel McCrea; Mary Astor; Rudy Vallee
- Cinematography: Victor Milner
- Edited by: Stuart Gilmore
- Music by: Victor Young
- Distributed by: Paramount Pictures
- Release dates: December 10, 1942 (New York City); January 1, 1943 (United States)
- Running time: 88 minutes
- Country: United States
- Language: English
- Budget: $950,000 (approx)
- Box office: $1.7 million (US rentals)

The Palm Beach Story is a 1942 American screwball comedy film written and directed by Preston Sturges, and starring Claudette Colbert, Joel McCrea, Mary Astor and Rudy Vallée. Victor Young contributed the musical score, including a fast-paced variation of the William Tell Overture for the opening scenes. Typical of a Sturges production, the pacing and dialogue of The Palm Beach Story are very fast. The film was distributed by Paramount Pictures.

== Plot summary ==
Inventor Tom Jeffers and his wife Gerry are struggling financially. Married for five years, the couple is still waiting for Tom's success. Eager to experience the finer things in life, Gerry decides that they both would be better off if they split. One day, she meets the "Wienie King", an elderly sausage magnate being shown around her Park Avenue apartment with his wife by a building manager anxious to rent it out from beneath his delinquent tenants. Sympathetic to her plight—and taken by her youth and charm—the man gives her $700, which is enough to pay their rent and their most urgent bills, buy a new dress, take Tom to an expensive dinner, and still leave $14 in change for Tom. She ultimately announces that she is leaving him.

Returning home from their dinner, Gerry gives in to Tom's advances, and they sleep together. The next morning, she awakens early and packs a bag. Tom awakens and chases after her, grabbing her suitcase, which opens and spills everything. She jumps in a taxi and rushes to Pennsylvania Station. Bound for Palm Beach, Florida, her plan is to obtain a divorce, meet and marry a wealthy man who can both give her what she craves and also help Tom.

Penniless and repeatedly escaping from Tom's clutches, she uses her feminine wiles to convince the well-to-do Ale and Quail Club, a men's hunting club, to buy her a ticket on their private car. When the Club members prove too rowdy and repeatedly fire off hunting rifles out the windows, nearly killing their bartender, Gerry flees in men's borrowed pajamas to the upper berth of a Pullman car, and meets the eccentric John D. Hackensacker III, who falls for her.

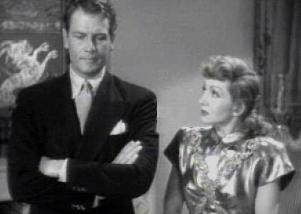
Joel McCrea and Claudette Colbert in the trailer for The Palm Beach Story

In the morning, Gerry learns that the Club's car has been disconnected due to their disorderly behavior, leaving her without her clothes and handbag. As they disembark in Jacksonville, she accepts John's chivalrous offer to buy her an entire new wardrobe of haute couture and expensive jewelry, despite not knowing who he is. When John hands the store manager a card telling him to charge it all to him, Gerry is excited to discover that he is one of the richest men in the world. The pair then board his yacht to Palm Beach.

Meanwhile, in New York City, the now despondent Tom receives the same kind of charity from the Wienie King he had accused Gerry of trading sexual favors with, which helps clear his mind. The King encourages him to rent a plane, fly to Florida, and show up with roses to win back Gerry.

Arriving in Palm Beach, Tom is directed to the dock and John's yacht. There, he sees the new couple aboard. Failing to run him off on shore, a flustered Gerry introduces Tom as her brother, Captain McGlue. John's sister, Princess Maud Centimillia, is smitten with Tom, dismissing her current lover, Toto, by asking him to retrieve a handkerchief.

When Gerry tells John, who is working his way to propose to her, that her "brother" is a partner with her husband in the same investment, John agrees to back their plans for a suspended airport, saying he likes the Captain and it will keep it "all in the family" once they are married.

Invited to stay at the Hackensacker estate, Tom and Gerry maintain their farce—while Tom reluctantly wrangles to win Gerry back, and Gerry seeks to stick to her original plan. One evening, as John serenades Gerry underneath her balcony, she and Tom end up romantically entangled just as they had their last night together.

The next morning, Tom and Gerry confess the ruse to the Hackensackers. After John agrees to finance Tom's invention as a "good investment", sans sentimentality, John and Maud are overjoyed when they discover that Tom and Gerry have twin siblings. A dual wedding takes place, with Tom as best man and Gerry as matron of honor, John hand-in-hand with Gerry's sister and Maud with Tom's brother.

== Cast ==
- Claudette Colbert as Geraldine "Gerry" Jeffers
- Joel McCrea as Tom Jeffers (alias "Captain McGlue")
- Mary Astor as the Princess Centimillia (Maud)
- Rudy Vallée as John D. Hackensacker III
- Sig Arno as Toto
- Robert Dudley as Wienie King
- Franklin Pangborn as apartment manager
- Arthur Hoyt as Pullman conductor
- Alan Bridge as conductor
- Snowflake as George, club car bartender
- Charles R. Moore as train porter
- Frank Moran as brakeman
- Harry Rosenthal as orchestra leader
- Esther Howard as wife of Wienie King
- J. Farrell MacDonald as Officer O'Donnell (uncredited)

The Ale and Quail Club:

- Robert Warwick as Mr. Hinch
- Arthur Stuart Hull as Mr. Osmond
- Torben Meyer as Dr. Kluck
- Jimmy Conlin as Mr. Asweld
- Victor Potel as Mr. McKeewie
- Unnamed members played by:
  - William Demarest
  - Jack Norton
  - Robert Greig
  - Roscoe Ates
  - Dewey Robinson
  - Chester Conklin
  - Sheldon Jett

== Production ==
At least part of the initial inspiration for The Palm Beach Story may have come to Preston Sturges from close to home. Not only had he shuttled back and forth to Europe as a young man, his ex-wife Eleanor Hutton was an heiress who moved among the European aristocracy, and had once been wooed by Prince Jerome Rospigliosi-Gioeni. One scene in the film is based upon an incident that had happened to Sturges and his mother while traveling by train to Paris, where the car with their compartment and baggage was uncoupled while they were in the dining car.

The story Sturges came up with was entitled Is Marriage Necessary?, which, along with an alternative, Is That Bad?, became a working title for the film. The original title was rejected by Hays Office censors, who also rejected the script submitted by Paramount over its "sex suggestive situations...and dialogue." In spite of changes the script was still tabled because of its "light treatment of marriage and divorce" and overt parodying of John D. Rockefeller. More changes were made, including reducing Princess Centimillia's divorces from eight to three (plus two annulments), before the script finally was approved.

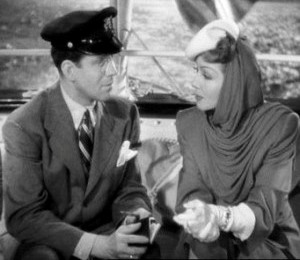
Rudy Vallée and Claudette Colbert

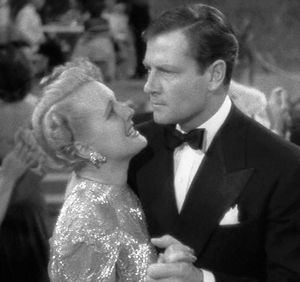
Mary Astor and Joel McCrea

This was Sturges' second collaboration with Joel McCrea, following Sullivan's Travels from the previous year, and they worked again on The Great Moment, filmed in 1942 (but released in 1944). Although Colbert and Sturges worked on The Big Pond (1930) and the first version of Imitation of Life (1934), The Palm Beach Story was the only time they worked on a movie Sturges wrote and directed.

Claudette Colbert received $150,000 for her role, and Joel McCrea was paid $60,000. The movie was Rudy Vallee's first outright comedic role, and he gained a contract with Paramount, as well as an award for Best Actor of 1942 from the National Board of Review. He appeared in Sturges' The Sin of Harold Diddlebock, Unfaithfully Yours and The Beautiful Blonde from Bashful Bend.

Mary Astor was uncomfortable with her character's high-speed, slang-filled chatter and came to resent Sturges' direction.

The second unit did background shooting at Penn Station in Manhattan for the exteriors (interiors were shot at standing set of Penn Station that Paramount owned). The film went into general release on 1 January 1943. It was released on video in the U.S. on 12 July 1990 and re-released on 30 June 1993.

== Reception ==
=== Contemporaneous reviews ===
Upon its release The Palm Beach Story received mixed reviews. Among the positive reviews were The Hollywood Reporter calling it a "sophisticated laugh riot" featuring one of Colbert's "most accomplished light performances." The Daily Film Renter praised the film's "scintillating dialogue and provocative situations." Variety described the film as a "tongue-in-cheek spoofing of the idle rich" and predicted that the escapist nature of the story "will prove a welcome change of pace in theaters that have perhaps been overloaded with strictly war output." "The boys in the camps, and in far-off places...will welcome the film for that very reason...there is no hint of war," wrote G.L. Burnett of The Knoxville Journal.

Other critics were put off by the escapist narrative. Edwin Schallert of the Los Angeles Times said the film “lacked social significance” and contained "next to no drama," concluding that "it's a question of weighing, perhaps, whether this is the least best or the next to least best" of Sturges' five films. He added that The Palm Beach Story suffered from the same fault as Sullivan's Travels: "a tricky and not too convincing ending." Several reviews claimed the reliance on dialogue made the film “slow and garrulous." Bosley Crowther of The New York Times claimed the film “is very short on action and very long on trivial talk…It should have been a breathless comedy. But only the actors are breathless—and that from talking too much.” He added: “Perhaps he was making an experiment in conversational comedy.”

Reporting a few hours after its release in the Rivoli Theatre, Ed Sullivan concluded:

"The cinema reporters did not like The Palm Beach Story...The reason that the critics felt let down by this flicker, obviously, was that they have come to look for something special from Sturges--wit, irony, undertones, the unconventional in a medium that often is conventional to the point of triteness...The Palm Beach Story, they felt, was third-rate Sturges and they announced the verdict, not with malice, but because they were rooting for another home run."

=== Retrospective reviews ===
The Palm Beach Story went on to garner positive reviews from the review aggregation website Rotten Tomatoes with a 97% positive rating based on 30 critic reviews. Retrospectively, the film has received critical acclaim for representing "the culmination of the great screwball comedy tradition of the 1930s."

In 1998, Jonathan Rosenbaum of the Chicago Reader included the film in his unranked list of the best American films not included on the AFI Top 100. In 2000, the American Film Institute included the film in AFI's 100 Years...100 Laughs (No. 77). They Shoot Pictures, Don't They?, a website which aggregates critical ranking lists, ranks Palm Beach Story as the 490th most acclaimed movie of all time.

== Themes and Analysis ==
Critic Stuart Klawans observes that The Palm Beach Story can be seen as an implied sequel to It Happened One Night, which ends with Colbert running at a full speed in wedding gown, just as Palm Beach Story begins. The latter movie thus complicates the former film's seemingly happy ending.
