= Sullivan's Travels =

1941 film by Preston Sturges

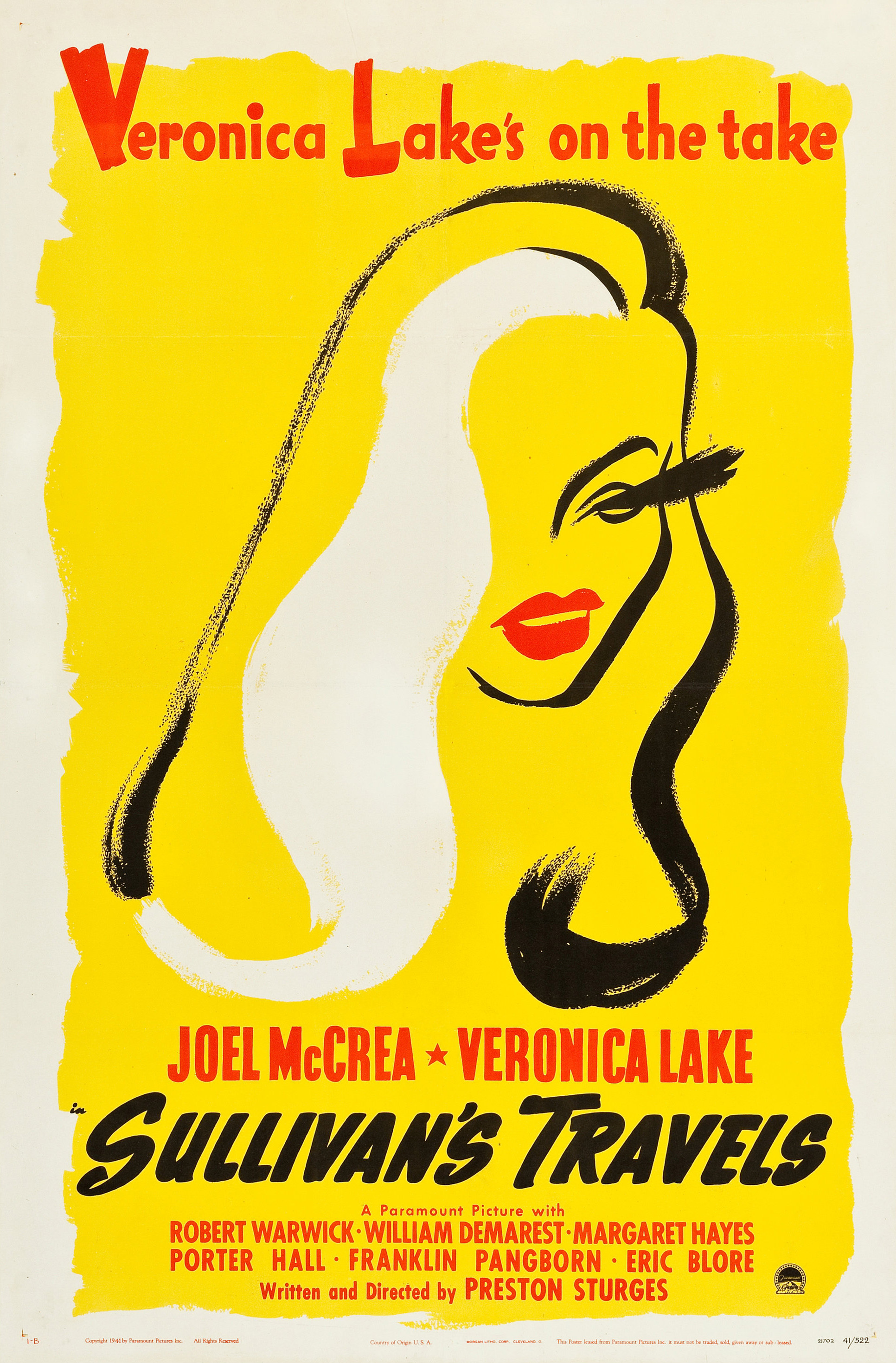
- Theatrical release poster by Maurice Kallis
- Directed by: Preston Sturges
- Written by: Preston Sturges
- Produced by: Paul Jones (Note: Buddy DeSylva and Sturges also acted as uncredited producers on the film.)
- Starring: Joel McCrea; Veronica Lake; Robert Warwick; William Demarest; Margaret Hayes; Porter Hall; Franklin Pangborn; Eric Blore
- Cinematography: John Seitz
- Edited by: Stuart Gilmore
- Music by: Leo Shuken; Charles Bradshaw
- Production company: Paramount Pictures
- Distributed by: Paramount Pictures
- Release date: December 29, 1941 (Jackson, Tennessee)
- Running time: 90 minutes
- Country: United States
- Language: English
- Budget: $678,000
- Box office: $1.2 million (US rentals)

Sullivan's Travels is a 1941 American comedy-drama film written and directed by Preston Sturges. A satire of the film industry, it follows a famous Hollywood comedy director (Joel McCrea) who, longing to make a socially relevant drama, sets out to live as a tramp to gain life experience for his forthcoming film. Along the way he unites with a poor aspiring actress (Veronica Lake) who accompanies him. The title is a reference to Gulliver's Travels, the 1726 novel by satirist Jonathan Swift about another journey of self-discovery.

Sullivan's Travels received a mixed reception from critics upon its release. The New York Times described it as "the most brilliant picture yet this year", praising Sturges's mix of escapist fun with underlying significance, and ranked it as one of the ten best films of 1941. But The Hollywood Reporter said that it lacked the "down to earth quality and sincerity which made [Sturges's] other three pictures of 1941 – The Great McGinty, The Lady Eve, and Christmas in July – "a joy to behold".

Over time, the film's reputation has improved tremendously. Media historian Hal Erickson classified it as a "classic", "one of the finest movies about movies ever made" and a "masterpiece". In 1990, Sullivan's Travels was selected for preservation in the United States National Film Registry by the Library of Congress as being "culturally, historically, or aesthetically significant."

== Plot ==
John L. Sullivan is a popular young Hollywood director of profitable but shallow comedies. Dissatisfied with making such films as Ants in Your Plants of 1939, he tells his studio boss, Mr. LeBrand, that he wants his next project to be a serious exploration of the plight of the downtrodden based on the novel O Brother, Where Art Thou? LeBrand wants him to direct another lucrative comedy instead, but Sullivan refuses. He wants to "know trouble" firsthand, and plans to travel as a tramp so he can make a film that truly depicts the sorrows of humanity. His British butler and valet both openly question the wisdom of his plan.

Sullivan dresses as a hobo and takes to the road, followed by staff in a bus imposed on him for his own safety by the studio. Nobody is happy with the arrangement, and Sullivan, after trying to lose the bus in a fast-paced car chase, eventually persuades his guardians to leave him alone and arranges to rendezvous with them later in Las Vegas. However, he soon returns to Los Angeles. There, in a diner, Sullivan meets a struggling young actress who has failed to make it in Hollywood and is just about to give up and go home. She believes he is a penniless tramp and buys him breakfast.

The film's trailer

In return for her kindness, Sullivan retrieves his car from his estate and gives her a ride. He neglects to tell his servants that he has returned, so they report the car stolen. Sullivan and the girl are briefly apprehended by police, but are released after things are cleared up. He and the girl go to his palatial mansion. After seeing how wealthy he is, she shoves him into his swimming pool for deceiving her. However, when he insists on trying again, she goes with him, over his objections, disguised as a boy.

This time Sullivan succeeds. After riding in a cattle car, eating in soup kitchens and sleeping in homeless shelters with the girl (where someone steals his shoes), Sullivan finally decides he has had enough. His experiment is publicized by the studio as a huge success. The girl wants to stay with him, but Sullivan reveals to her that he is married, lovelessly, to someone else, having been advised to do so solely to reduce his taxes. Worse, the plan backfired, with Sullivan's joint returns higher than when he was single and his wife having an affair with his business manager.

Sullivan decides to thank the homeless for the insights he has gained by handing out $5 bills. At a train yard, a man knocks Sullivan unconscious, steals his money and shoes, and dumps him in a departing boxcar. While escaping with Sullivan's money, the thief gets run over by another train. When the mangled body is found, the ID cards sewn into the stolen shoes identify the deceased as Sullivan.

Sullivan wakes up in another city, with no memory of who he is or how he got there. A yard bull finds him and accosts him for illegally entering the rail yard. In his dazed state, Sullivan hits the man with a rock, earning himself a six-year sentence of hard labor in a work camp. He gradually regains his memory. In the camp, he attends a showing of Walt Disney's 1934 Playful Pluto cartoon, a rare treat for the prisoners, and is surprised to find himself laughing at Pluto's painful misadventures along with the rest of them.

Unable to convince anybody either that he is Sullivan or communicate with the outside world, he comes up with a solution: after learning of his unsolved "killing" on the front page of an old newspaper, he confesses to being the murderer. When his picture makes the front page, he is recognized and released. His "widow" has married his business manager, meaning she will have to grant him a divorce or be charged with bigamy. Sullivan's boss finally tells him he can make O Brother, Where Art Thou? Sullivan confesses he has changed his mind; he now wants to continue making comedies, having seen firsthand the joy they bring to the downtrodden.

== Cast ==
- Joel McCrea as John L. Sullivan
- Veronica Lake as The Girl
- Robert Warwick as Mr. LeBrand
- William Demarest as Mr. Jonas
- Franklin Pangborn as Mr. Casalsis
- Porter Hall as Mr. Hadrian
- Byron Foulger as Mr. Johnny Valdelle
- Margaret Hayes as secretary
- Robert Greig as Burrows, Sullivan's butler
- Eric Blore as Sullivan's valet
- Torben Meyer as the doctor
- Georges Renavent as old tramp
- Jan Buckingham as Mrs. Sullivan
- Emory Parnell as rail yard bull (uncredited)
- Jess Lee Brooks as the preacher (uncredited)
- Charles R. Moore as the chef

== Themes ==
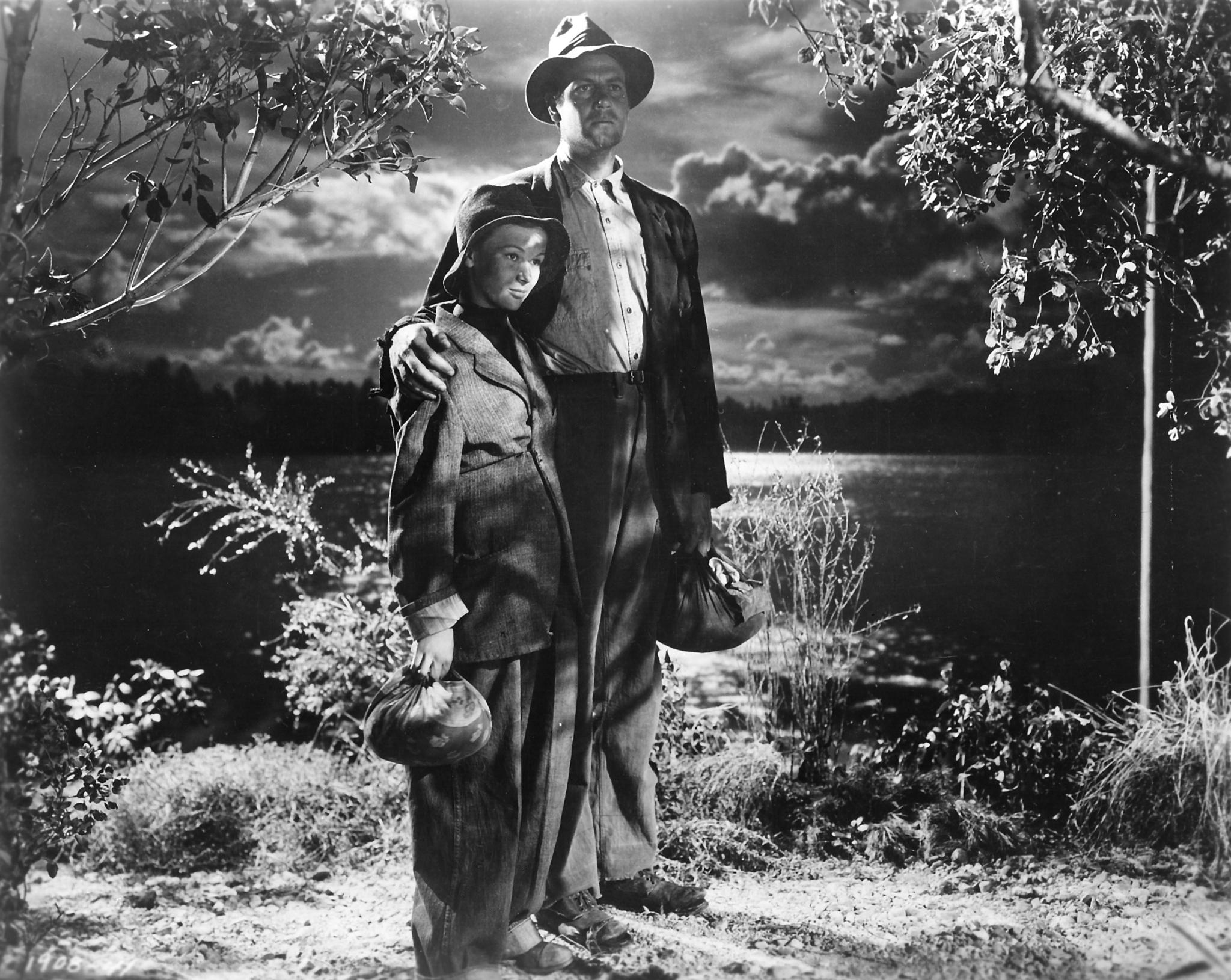
Veronica Lake and Joel McCrea in Sullivan's Travels

The film's primary theme is best summed up in the last line of dialogue as spoken by Sullivan: "There's a lot to be said for making people laugh. Did you know that's all some people have? It isn't much, but it's better than nothing in this cockeyed caravan."

The scene in which the prisoners are taken to watch the 1934 Disney cartoon Playful Pluto takes place in a Southern black church; the film treats the African-American characters there with a level of respect unusual in films of the period. The Secretary of the NAACP, Walter White, wrote to Sturges:

I want to congratulate and thank you for the church sequence in Sullivan's Travels. This is one of the most moving scenes I have seen in a moving picture for a long time. But I am particularly grateful to you, as are a number of my friends, both white and colored, for the dignified and decent treatment of Negroes in this scene. I was in Hollywood recently and am to return there soon for conferences with production heads, writers, directors, and actors and actresses in an effort to induce broader and more decent picturization of the Negro instead of limiting him to menial or comic roles. The sequence in Sullivan's Travels is a step in that direction and I want you to know how grateful we are.

== Production ==
=== Development ===
Paramount purchased Sturges's script for Sullivan's Travels for $6,000. He wrote the film as a response to the "preaching" he found in other comedies "which seemed to have abandoned the fun in favor of the message."

The film as released opens with a dedication:

To the memory of those who made us laugh: the motley mountebanks, the clowns, the buffoons, in all times and in all nations, whose efforts have lightened our burden a little, this picture is affectionately dedicated.

This was originally intended to be spoken by Sullivan. Sturges wanted the film to begin with the prologue: "This is the story of a man who wanted to wash an elephant. The elephant darn near ruined him." Paramount contracted with the Schlesinger Corp., who made the Warner Bros. Looney Tunes and Merrie Melodies cartoons, to make an animated main title sequence, but this was not used in the film, if it was ever actually produced.

The censors at the Hays Office had objections to the script they received. They felt that the word "bum" would be rejected by British censors, and warned that there should be no "suggestion of sexual intimacy" between Sullivan and The Girl in the scenes in which they are sleeping together at the mission.

=== Casting ===
Sturges wrote the film with Joel McCrea in mind, but found the female lead—Veronica Lake—through the casting process. Before Lake was cast, Barbara Stanwyck was considered, as well as Frances Farmer.

=== Filming ===
Sullivan's Travels went into production on May 12, 1941, and wrapped on July 22. Location shooting took place in Canoga Park, San Marino, Castaic and at Lockheed Air Terminal.

Lake was six months pregnant at the beginning of production, a fact she did not disclose to Sturges until filming began. Sturges was so furious that, according to Lake, he had to be physically restrained. Sturges consulted with Lake's doctor to see if she could perform the part, and hired former Tournament of Roses queen Cheryl Walker as Lake's double. Costume designer Edith Head was tasked to find ways of concealing Lake's pregnancy. Reportedly, Lake was disliked by a few of her co-stars. McCrea refused to work with her again, and subsequently turned down a lead role with her in I Married a Witch. Fredric March, who took the latter part, did not much enjoy working with Lake, either. However, McCrea got along famously with Sturges, and afterward presented him with a watch engraved "for the finest direction I've ever had." Sturges' assistant director, Anthony Mann, also was influenced heavily by his experience on the production.

There were some minor problems during filming. Sturges had wanted to use a clip from a Charlie Chaplin film for the church scene, but was turned down by Chaplin and the Disney cartoon substituted instead. Lake does parody Chaplin's "Little Tramp" character earlier in the film. Also, the poverty montage was scheduled to take three hours to film, but took seven hours. The film cost $689,000 to produce, some $86,000 over budget.

== Release and reception ==
The film was given a pre-screening for critics on December 4, 1941, before premiering in Jackson, Tennessee on December 29, 1941. Its Hollywood premiere occurred on February 12, 1942, at the Los Angeles Paramount Theatre.

When the film was released, the U.S. Office of Censorship declined to approve it for export overseas during wartime, because of the "long sequence showing life in a prison chain gang which is most objectionable because of the brutality and inhumanity with which the prisoners are treated." This conformed with the office's standing policy of not exporting films that could be used for propaganda purposes by the enemy. The producers of the film declined to make suggested changes that could have altered the film's status.

=== Critical response ===
Sullivan's Travels was not immediately successful at the box office as were earlier Sturges films such as The Great McGinty and The Lady Eve, and received mixed critical reception. Although the review in The New York Times called the film "the most brilliant picture yet this year" and praised Sturges' mix of escapist fun with underlying significance, The Hollywood Reporter said that it lacked the "down to earth quality and sincerity which made [Sturges's] other three pictures a joy to behold" and that "Sturges...fails to heed the message that writer Sturges proves in his script. Laughter is the thing people want—not social studies." The New Yorker's review said that "anyone can make a mistake, Preston Sturges, even. The mistake in question is a pretentious number called Sullivan's Travels." Nevertheless, the Times named it as one of the ten best films of 1941, and the National Board of Review nominated it as best picture of the year.

Over time, the reputation of the film has improved tremendously, and it is now considered a classic; at least one reviewer called it Sturges's "masterpiece" and "one of the finest movies about movies ever made." On the review aggregator website Rotten Tomatoes, it holds an approval rating of perfect 100% based on 42 reviews, with an average rating of 8.9/10. Its critics' consensus reads, "Blending screwball comedy with a socially conscious message, Sullivan's Travels offers delightful proof of writer-director Preston Sturges' ability to provoke serious thought as well as helpless laughter."

In 2020, Diabolique Magazine described Lake's character as "captivating, magical, and extremely sexy, whether sitting on McCrea's lap in a bathrobe and combing his hair or walking along the road in a hobo overcoat ... She wasn't great with all her dialogue but Sturges made her spit it out at rapid-fire pace and protected her limitations. It's a performance for the ages."

=== Home media ===
Sullivan's Travels was released on video in the United States on March 16, 1989, and re-released on June 30, 1993. The film was re-released in the United Kingdom with a restored print on May 12, 2000.

The Criterion Collection issued a special edition DVD of the film on August 21, 2001, before reissuing a newly restored version of the film both DVD and Blu-ray in 2015. Previously, the film was also released on Blu-ray in the UK by Arrow Video under the Arrow Academy label in 2014.

=== Legacy ===
In 1990, Sullivan's Travels was selected for preservation in the United States National Film Registry by the Library of Congress as being "culturally, historically, or aesthetically significant." In 2000, the American Film Institute listed the film at No. 39 on AFI's 100 Years...100 Laughs. In 2006, it was ranked No. 25 on AFI's 100 Years...100 Cheers. In 2007, it was ranked at No. 61 on the anniversary edition of their 100 Years...100 Movies.

In 2006, the Writers Guilds of America voted the screenplay for Sullivan's Travels as the 29th greatest ever written, as well as the 35th funniest. The film's poster was ranked as No. 19 of "The 25 Best Movie Posters Ever" by Premiere. A 2010 special issue of Trains magazine ranked Sullivan's Travels 25th among the 100 greatest train films.

O Brother, Where Art Thou?, the fictional book that Sullivan wants to adapt for the screen, was used as the title of the 2000 film of the same name under the direction by the Coen brothers.

In 2022, the film was ranked joint 243rd in the Sight & Sound Greatest Films of All Time poll, tied with 21 other films.

==== Adaptations ====
On November 9, 1942, Lux Radio Theatre broadcast a radio adaptation of Sullivan's Travels with Ralph Bellamy in the lead role and Veronica Lake reprising her role.

== See also ==
- List of cult films
- List of films featuring fictional films
