= The Miracle of Morgan's Creek =

1944 film by Preston Sturges

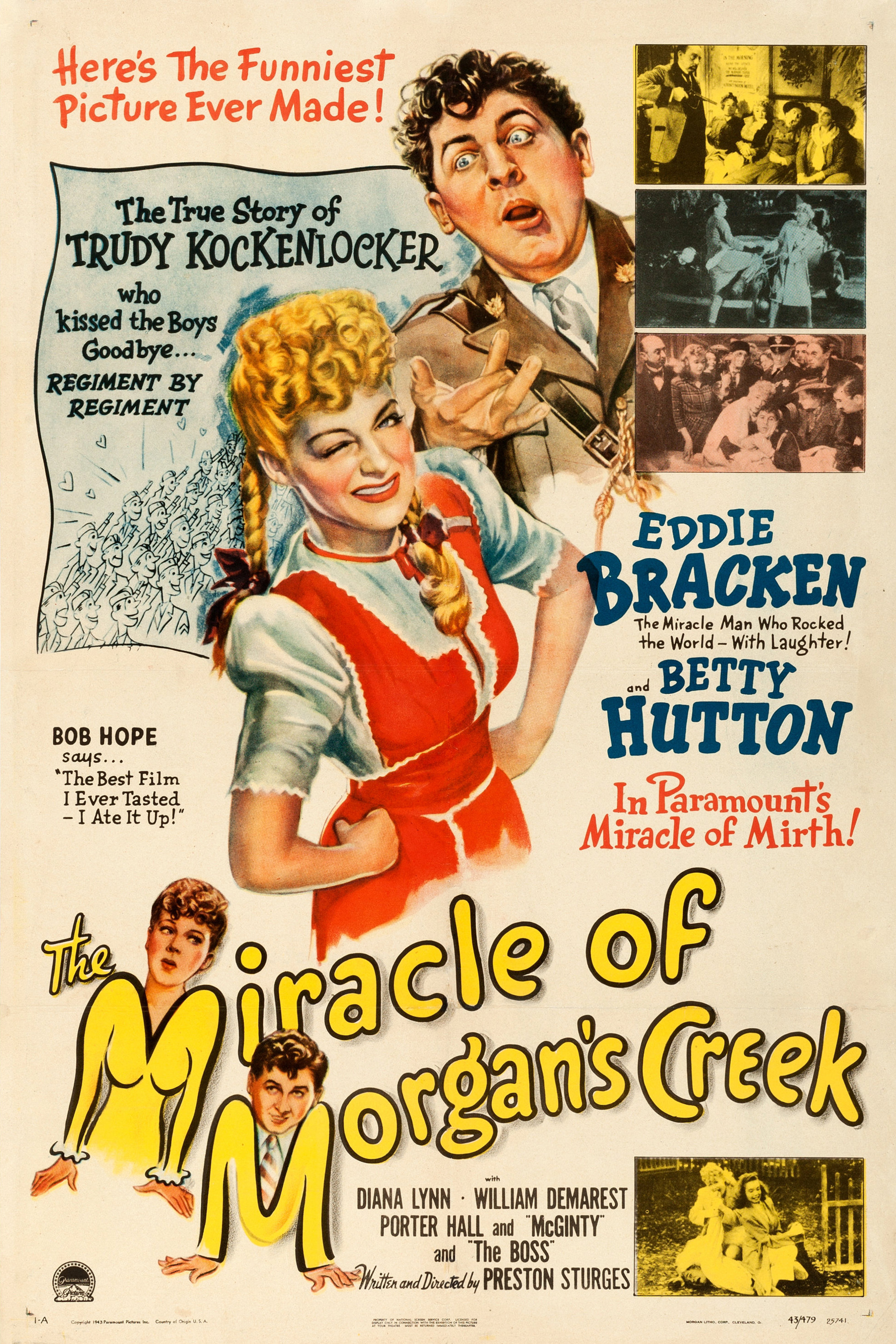
- Theatrical release poster
- Directed by: Preston Sturges
- Written by: Preston Sturges
- Produced by: Preston Sturges
- Starring: Eddie Bracken; Betty Hutton
- Cinematography: John F. Seitz
- Edited by: Stuart Gilmore
- Music by: Charles Bradshaw (Note: Produced musical score); Leo Shuken; Gil Grau (uncredited); Preston Sturges (Note: Wrote songs); Ted Snyder
- Distributed by: Paramount Pictures
- Release dates: December 24, 1943 (United Kingdom); January 19, 1944 (New York City)
- Running time: 99 minutes
- Country: United States
- Language: English
- Budget: $775,000
- Box office: $9 million (U.S.)

The Miracle of Morgan's Creek is a 1943 (Note: The film had its official theatrical release in the United Kingdom in December 1943.) American screwball comedy film written and directed by Preston Sturges, starring Eddie Bracken and Betty Hutton, and featuring Diana Lynn, William Demarest and Porter Hall. Brian Donlevy and Akim Tamiroff reprise their roles from Sturges' 1940 film The Great McGinty. Set against the backdrop of World War II-era America, its plot follows a wayward young woman who, after attending a party with soldiers in her small town, awakens to find herself married and pregnant, with no memory of her new suitor's identity.

Sturges began developing the idea for the film in the late 1930s, and wrote both Hutton's and Demarest's roles with the actors in mind. Principal photography took place between late 1942 and early 1943. Early into production, the film was met by considerable objections from the Hays Office for its candid depiction of an unwed pregnant mother, as well as for its representation of American soldiers, which the United States War Department felt might be potentially unflattering.

The film's narrative structure is shaped around the titular "miracle"—the lead character's birth of sextuplets—being revealed at the end of the film, and Paramount Pictures promoted it with the suggestion that audiences and the press avoid revealing its surprise ending.

Released in the United Kingdom in December 1943 and in the United States in early 1944, The Miracle of Morgan's Creek was met by critical praise at the time of its release, and continues to receive generally positive reception in modern reviews. It was nominated for a 1945 Academy Award for Best Original Screenplay. In 2001, it was selected for preservation in the United States National Film Registry by the Library of Congress as being "culturally, historically, or aesthetically significant." The film ranks #54 on the American Film Institute's 100 Years... 100 Laughs list of the top 100 funniest films in history.

== Plot ==
Trudy Kockenlocker is the daughter of the town constable of Morgan's Creek. Against her father's orders, she attends a wild farewell party for a group of soldiers at which she hits her head on a chandelier while dancing. The next morning, Trudy is in a daze and slowly begins to recall the previous night's events. She had married a soldier but cannot remember his name, except that "it had a z in it. Like Ratzkywatzky...or was it Zitzkywitzky?" She believes that she and the groom had used fake names, so she does not know how to get in touch with him and cannot remember what he looks like. She also does not have the marriage license.

Trudy learns that she became pregnant that night as well. Norval Jones, a local 4-F boy who has been in love with Trudy for years, steps in to help out, but Trudy's overprotective father becomes involved and complicates matters. Norval and Trudy devise a plan: they will get married secretly under false names, which will provide her a marriage certificate with the fake name of Ratzkywatzky and help her avoid a scandal. Later, Trudy will get a divorce, and she and Norval will get married legitimately.

At the rushed wedding ceremony, in which Norval wears an antique WW1 "doughboy" uniform, a frazzled Norval mistakenly signs his real name and the minister calls the police. Norval is brought to the Kockenlocker house where military, state and federal officers fight with Constable Kockenlocker over jurisdiction. Norval is accused of abducting Trudy, impersonating a soldier, impairing the morals of a minor, resisting arrest and perjury. Trudy's father arrests Norval and locks him in the town jail after the justice of the peace rips up the fake marriage certificate. Trudy then tells her father the truth about the marriage, her pregnancy and Norval's attempt to pose as her groom. Her father agrees to let Norval escape so that he can find Trudy's real husband.

Needing money to begin his quest but with the bank where he works closed for the night, Norval sneaks into the bank with the constable's assistance to take $900 while leaving his bonds there that are worth the same amount. Trying to open a safe, Norval trips the burglar alarm, so Trudy and her sister Emmy tie up their father at the police station to make it look as if he had been incapacitated by a burglar. After months in hiding, Norval appears at his attorney's office, where he learns that the constable was fired after his ruse was not believed and that the Kockenlockers have moved out of town. Norval's attorney urges him to disappear, but Norval is determined to find Trudy. However, he is spotted in town by the bank manager, who alerts the police.

Near the end of her pregnancy at Christmastime, the constable approaches the city council to tell them that Trudy wants to tell the real story and exonerate Norval. But before she can do so, Trudy goes into labor and is rushed to the hospital, where she gives birth to sextuplets, all boys. After receiving the news, Governor McGinty and The Boss demand that Norval be set free, with the charges dropped. Trudy's first marriage is annulled and Trudy and Norval are declared to be married after all. The governor even gives Norval a retroactive commission in the state guard, entitling him to legally wear a uniform, and Trudy's father is named police chief.

When Norval discovers that Trudy has given birth to six boys, he is overwhelmed, and the film ends with this epilogue on a title card:

But Norval recovered and
became increasingly happy
for, as Shakespeare said:
"Some are born great, some
achieve greatness, and some
have greatness thrust upon
them." (Note: This quote is spoken by the character Malvolio in Twelfth Night, Act II, Scene IV)
THE END

== Cast ==
- Eddie Bracken as Norval Jones
- Betty Hutton as Trudy Kockenlocker
- Diana Lynn as Emmy Kockenlocker
- William Demarest as Constable Kockenlocker
- Porter Hall as Justice of the Peace
- Emory Parnell as Mr. Tuerck
- Al Bridge as Mr. Johnson
- Julius Tannen as Mr. Rafferty
- Victor Potel as Newspaper editor
- Brian Donlevy as Gov. McGinty
- Akim Tamiroff as The Boss
- Bobby Watson as Adolf Hitler (uncredited)

== Analysis ==
Sturges biographer Diane Jacobs identifies unconventional family life as the core theme of The Miracle at Morgan's Creek, citing that the families portrayed in the film parallel Sturges's own family life with Isadora Duncan and Aleister Crowley.

Andrew Katzenstein in The New York Review of Books writes "a parody of the Virgin Birth with the Holy Ghost taking the form of a GI", "Joseph is her long-suffering admirer, Norval (Eddie Bracken), emasculated by Trudy and by the army, which won’t let him serve because of minor (and likely psychosomatic) vision trouble. The Christ Child multiplies into sextuplets, all male, who soon become a propaganda tool against the Axis."

== Production ==
=== Screenplay ===
Sturges developed the idea for The Miracle of Morgan's Creek by the late-1930s: The original story revolved around his heroine, Trudy Kockenlocker, a woman who becomes pregnant by a wealthy banker's son who refuses to marry her, leading her to being cared for by a hermit before she gives birth to sextuplets. The story eventually was reshaped into something "far less sentimental", featuring the character of Trudy becoming pregnant by a soldier, with the character of Norval, her friend, pursuing her.

Describing the screenplay, Sturges biographer Diane Jacobs notes that the film features small-town characters who "are as diverse and scrappy as city folk. And though perpetually thrown together, they certainly do not blend. Nor do they easily inhabit their landscape." Unlike Sturges's previous screenplays, Easy Living (1937) and The Lady Eve (1941), which blend elements of farce and comedy, Jacobs notes that The Miracle of Morgan's Creek instead combines farce and melodrama, "maximizing the pain and violence inherent in both forms."

=== Casting ===
While Sturges was completing The Great Moment (1944), he pitched the idea for the film intending to cast Betty Hutton and Harry Carey in the lead roles as Trudy and Norval. Hutton was cast in the lead role of Trudy, while Eddie Bracken was cast as Norval. The role of Papa Kockenlocker was written with William Demarest in mind, while Sturges chose to cast pianist Diana Lynn as Trudy's sister.

=== Filming ===
Principal photography took place between October 21 to December 23, 1942, with additional scenes shot on February 25, 1943. Outdoor scenes were shot at the Paramount Ranch in Agoura, California. Sturges was reported to have been "moody" on the set, partly attributed to the pressure he had received from the production code over the film's controversial content. Bracken stated that he and Sturges "never had any real problems" on set, but did note that the director was often harshly critical of the actors, which Bracken felt was a method Sturges employed to help "deepen the performances."

Despite Paramount's wishes to maintain a tight shooting schedule, Sturges was liberal with his use of film stock, sometimes shooting sequences up to fifty times, inflating the production budget against the studio's wishes. Executive Buddy DeSylva expressed anger over Sturges' shooting methods, stating in a letter to Sturges:

I think it is absolutely disgraceful. You, along with every other director, have been warned that the Company must conserve film. [That you could] waste this much film when you had at least two takes that might have been used actually amounts to sabotage... No other director on the lot needs fifty takes to get a scene. Either you do not properly explain to the actors what they are called on to do, or you engage inadequate actors, or perhaps get so upset after take #15 or #20 that they are no longer capable of giving you what you desire.

== Music ==
In addition to the music score by Charles Bradshaw and Leo Shuken, two songs appear in the film:

- "The Bell in the Bay" – music and lyrics by Preston Sturges
- "Sleepy Summer Days" – music by Ted Snyder, lyrics by Sturges

== Release ==
The Miracle of Morgan's Creek was released in the United Kingdom on December 24, 1943.

In the United States, the film was withheld from distribution until early 1944, because Paramount had a backlog of unreleased films, including Sturges' The Great Moment (1944). In September 1942, Paramount sold a number of films, such as I Married a Witch, to United Artists, which needed to keep its distribution pipeline filled, but Paramount held on to The Miracle of Morgan's Creek because it was directed by Sturges, waiting for an opportunity to release it.

=== Censorship ===
Problems arose with Hays Office censors early into the film's production because of its subject matter, particularly its candid representation of an unwed pregnant woman. In October 1942, after a story conference, the office sent Paramount a seven-page letter outlining their concerns, including those about lines spoken by the 14-year-old character Emmy and the Trudy character having been drunk and then pregnant. The office wanted the filmmakers to be "extremely careful in handling a subject of this kind because of the delicate nature of the high point of the story," and to refrain from reiterating the basic facts of the story after they have been presented. In December 1942, they also warned about making any metaphorical comparisons between Trudy's situation and the virgin birth of Jesus.

Additional concerns were raised about the portrayal of American soldiers as rowdy and lacking "proper conduct." In a February 1943 letter by the United States War Department, they urged the filmmakers to ensure that the scene in which the soldiers depart for their deployment "should result in giving the audience the feeling that these boys are normal, thoroughly fit American soldiers who have had an evening of clean fun."

There were so many objections raised from the censors that Sturges began production with only 10 approved script pages.

Sturges' intent was to "show what happens to young girls who disregard their parents' advice and who confuse patriotism with promiscuity," and had included in his script a sermon for the pastor to deliver, expressing Sturges' opinions, but the scene was cut by the studio because the pastor was depicted in too comic a manner.

=== Home media ===
Paramount Home Entertainment released the film on DVD and VHS on September 6, 2005.

== Reception ==
=== Box office ===
The film premiered at New York's Paramount Theatre on January 19, 1944. To promote the film, Paramount aired a 20-minute preview on the some 400 television sets then in use in New York City on March 21, 1944, with stills from the film, narration by Eddie Bracken and an interview with Diana Lynn. Paramount asked reviewers not to reveal the ending to avoid spoiling it for those who had not yet seen the film. It is believed that Sturges also withheld the ending from the Hays Office.

Although the Hays Office received many letters of protest because of its subject matter, the film was Paramount's highest-grossing film of 1944, taking in $9 million in box-office receipts while playing to standing-room-only audiences in some theaters.

The Miracle of Morgan's Creek is one of the few Paramount sound films produced before 1950 that still belong to Paramount Pictures and not EMKA, Ltd./NBCUniversal, along with Bride of Vengeance, My Friend Irma, Rope of Sand, Sorry, Wrong Number, and The Buccaneer, among others.

=== Critical response ===
The Miracle of Morgan's Creek received overwhelmingly favorable reviews from critics upon release. Reg Whitley of the Daily Mirror praised the film as "a hundred minutes of brilliant nonsense."

Bosley Crowther wrote in The New York Times: "a more audacious picture—a more delightfully irreverent one—than this new lot of nonsense at the Paramount has never come slithering madly down the path. Mr. Sturges ... has hauled off this time and tossed a satire which is more cheeky than all the rest...It is hard to imagine how he ever got away with such a thing, how he ever persuaded the Hays boys that he wasn't trying to undermine all morals. Not only does he boldly make mad Christmas over a fact of approaching maternity but he frankly satirizes the sort of marriage that is significantly featured by a shotgun. No coying around with tiny garments in this one, no waiting the event with bated breath...Maybe the humor is forced a little, and it may be slightly difficult at times to understand precisely what in heck is going on. But that doesn't make any difference. At those times, you can catch your breath."

Critic James Agee, writing in The Nation, noted that "the Hays office has either been hypnotized into a liberality for which it should be thanked, or has been raped in its sleep" to allow the film to be released. In a second review, Agee described the film as "a little like taking a nun on a roller coaster ... The overall result is one of the most violently funny comedies, one of the most original, vigorous and cheerfully outrageous moving pictures that ever came out of Hollywood. The picture also has its faults—both as fun and as cinema ... Most of the finest human and comic potentialities of the story are lost because Sturges is so much less interested in his characters than in using them as hobbyhorses for his own wit."

In 1944, National Board of Review critic James Shelly Hamilton was baffled: "He mingles all kinds of hodge-podge things together with a Gothic exuberance and an amorality mixed with disillusionment. He shies away from a deeply emotional scene. He is obviously going somewhere. But where? And when is he going to arrive?".

In 1944, writing in the Los Angeles Times, reviewer Edwin Schallert wrote: "It is a feature that is intensely, even stridently, a departure from the normal Hollywood output...you can have all the fun you wish out of this picture if you won't try to take it too seriously at any time. It belongs essentially to the screwball comedy school, and goes to most outlandish lengths in its climax, which has the misfortune to show up the whole thing."

In 1945, Film Daily's 23rd-Annual poll, asking hundreds of critics to name their top sixty films for 1943–44, The Miracle of Morgan's Creek was the 15th-most named. Also, it was included in 1943-44's top boxoffice attractions by the trade magazines Fame, Showman's Trade Review, and Boxoffice Barometer.

General and later President Dwight D. Eisenhower was an outspoken fan of the film.

==== Modern appraisal ====
In 1991, Pauline Kael wrote, "This is one of Preston Sturges's surreal-slapstick-satire-conniption-fit comedies, and part of our great, crude heritage."

In 1987, British critic Leslie Halliwell gave it three of four stars, stating: "Weird and wonderful one-man assault on the Hays Office and sundry other American institutions such as motherhood and politics: an indescribable, tasteless, roaringly funny mêlée, as unexpected at the time as it was effective, like a kick in the pants to all other film comedies."

In a positive review of nine out of ten stars by Mike Massie, writing for Gone With The Twins, states the film is "handled with a spectacular hilarity and cleverness; when the hole is dug this deep, the only way out is through further outrageousness." Jeffrey M. Anderson of Combustible Celluloid gave a rating of three-and-a-half stars out of four, noting the zany tone of the film, and positively questioning how Sturges got away with such a film, especially during the era of the Hays Code.

On the review aggregator website Rotten Tomatoes, 87% of 30 critics' reviews are positive, with an average rating of 8.2/10. The website's consensus reads: "The Miracle of Morgan's Creek finds director Preston Sturges at his most zanily subversive—not to mention hilarious." Metacritic, which uses a weighted average, assigned the film a score of 86 out of 100, based on 15 critics, indicating "universal acclaim".

=== Accolades ===
Award/association	Year	Category	Recipient(s) and nominee(s)	Result	Ref.
Academy Awards	1945	Best Original Screenplay	Preston Sturges	Nominated	
National Board of Review	1945	Top Ten Films	The Miracle of Morgan's Creek	3rd Place	
National Board of Review	1945	Best Acting	Betty Hutton	Won	
National Film Preservation Board	2001	National Film Registry	The Miracle of Morgan's Creek	Inducted	
New York Film Critics Circle	1945	Best Director	Preston Sturges	Nominated	

== Legacy ==
In 2001, the film was selected for preservation in the United States National Film Registry by the Library of Congress as being "culturally, historically, or aesthetically significant." In 2006, it was voted by Premiere one of "The 50 Greatest Comedies of All Time."

The film is recognized by the American Film Institute in these lists:

- 1998: AFI's 100 Years...100 Movies – Nominated
- 2000: AFI's 100 Years...100 Laughs – #54

The 1958 film Rock-A-Bye Baby, starring Jerry Lewis, was loosely based on The Miracle of Morgan's Creek. Sturges received a credit for that film, but did not actually participate in the project.

== See also ==
- The Dionne quintuplets

== Sources ==
- Agee, James (1944). "The Miracle of Morgan's Creek". The Nation.
- Curtis, James (1984) [1982]. Between Flops: A Biography of Preston Sturges. New York City, New York: Limelight Editions. ISBN 978-0-879-10026-1.
- Gant, Harry Arthur (2009). I Saw Them Ride Away. Johnson County, Wyoming: Castle Knob Publishing. ISBN 978-1-441-40234-9.
- Jacobs, Diane (1992). Christmas in July: The Life and Art of Preston Sturges. Berkeley, California: University of California Press. ISBN 978-0-520-07926-7.
- Metz, Walter (January 1, 2016). "Perambulation, or the Real Miracle of Morgan's Creek". Mise-en-Scene: The Journal of Film and Visual Narration. 1 (1). Southern Illinois University Carbondale. PDF
- Gibbs, John; Glitre, Kathrina; Pye, Douglas (2025). "The Miracle of Morgan's Creek (1944): three perspectives on Preston Sturges and the Production Code". Quarterly Review of Film and Video. 42 (1): 157–184. doi:10.1080/10509208.2024.2410530. ISSN 1543-5326. PDF
