= Leo Shuken =

American composer and film orchestrator

Leo Shuken (born December 8, 1906, Los Angeles, California – d. July 24, 1976, Santa Monica, California) was an American film music composer, arranger, and musical director, who specialized in epic or Western film genres, including "The Magnificent Seven" series.

Shuken composed for the music industry from the end of the 1930s until shortly before his death, contributing music to over 100 films (many of which were uncredited). He was a favored and frequent orchestrator for the scores of Victor Young; among them My Foolish Heart (1949), Scaramouche (1952) and Around the World in 80 Days (1956).

His first, uncredited, score was for Go West, Young Man in 1937. He won an Academy Award for his work on the 1939 film Stagecoach, and was nominated in 1964 for the Academy Award for Best Original Score for The Unsinkable Molly Brown.
