= Paul Jones (film producer) =

American film producer

Paul Jones (1901–1968) was an American film producer. His major work was done for Paramount Pictures.

== Career ==
Jones produced films directed by Preston Sturges and those featuring Bob Hope, Dean Martin and Jerry Lewis. He also produced the Red Skelton comedy A Southern Yankee (1948) for Metro-Goldwyn-Mayer.
