= How Green Was My Valley =

How Green Was My Valley may refer to:

- How Green Was My Valley (novel), a 1939 historical novel by the Welsh-English novelist Richard Llewellyn
- How Green Was My Valley (film), a 1941 film adaptation of the novel
- How Green Was My Valley (1960 TV series), a BBC adaptation of the novel
- How Green Was My Valley (1975 TV series), a BBC adaptation of the novel

== See also ==
- How Green Is the Valley, a 1986 studio album by British folk punk group The Men They Couldn't Hang
