= None but the Lonely Heart =

None but the Lonely Heart may refer to:

- "None but the Lonely Heart" (Tchaikovsky), a musical setting by Pyotr Ilyich Tchaikovsky of a Russian translation of Johann Wolfgang von Goethe's poem "Nur wer die Sehnsucht kennt", published in 1869
- None but the Lonely Heart (novel), by Richard Llewellyn (1943)
- None but the Lonely Heart (film), a 1944 movie based on the novel starring Cary Grant, Ethel Barrymore and Barry Fitzgerald
- None but the Lonely Heart (album), a 1997 album by pianist Chris Anderson and bassist Charlie Haden
