= Poison Pen =

A poison pen letter is malicious correspondence.

Poison Pen may also refer to:

- Poison Pen (album), a 2006 album by Chino XL
- "Poison Pen" (song), a 1986 song by Hoodoo Gurus
- Poison Pen (play), a 1937 play by Richard Llewellyn
- Poison Pen, a 1993 English play by Ronald Harwood
- Poison Pen (1939 film), a British film based on the 1937 play
- Poison Pen, a biography of American author and journalist Kitty Kelley by George Carpozi Jr.
- Poison Pen (2014 film), an Irish film with screenplay by Eoin Colfer
- Poison pen (weapon), an improvised North Korean weapon
- Poison Pen Films, a UK film company

== See also ==
- Poisoned Pen Press, American publisher of mysteries
