= Poison Pen (1939 film) =

- Reginald Tate, Flora Robson and Ann Todd in Poison Pen
- Directed by: Paul L. Stein
- Written by: Esther McCracken; N. C. Hunter; Doreen Montgomery; William Freshman
- Based on: Poison Pen by Richard Llewellyn
- Produced by: Walter C. Mycroft
- Starring: Flora Robson; Reginald Tate; Ann Todd; Robert Newton
- Cinematography: Philip Tannura
- Edited by: Flora Newton
- Music by: Harry Acres
- Production company: Associated British Picture Corporation
- Distributed by: Associated British-Pathé
- Release date: 4 July 1939
- Running time: 79 minutes
- Country: United Kingdom
- Language: English
- Budget: £29,177

Poison Pen is a 1939 British drama film directed by Paul L. Stein and starring Flora Robson, Reginald Tate and Ann Todd. It was written by Esther McCracken, N. C. Hunter, Doreen Montgomery and William Freshman based on the 1937 play of the same title by Richard Llewellyn. The film version was made by the Associated British Picture Corporation at their Elstree Studios and opened in London on 4 July 1939.

Kenneth Connor, later to become a regular in Britain's Carry On films of the 1960s and 1970s, made his film debut as a post office boy.

== Original play ==
Written shortly before his novels How Green Was My Valley and None But the Lonely Heart, Llewellyn's play – concerning an outbreak of anonymous poison-pen letters that destabilise a small rural community – was first presented at Richmond, near London, on 9 August 1937. A West End production, using a revised text, opened at the Shaftesbury Theatre on 9 April 1938, moving to the Playhouse in July and the Garrick in August, achieving in all 176 performances and closing on 10 September. Theatre historian J. C. Trewin described the play, under the heading 'How Grim Was My Village', as "a showy bit of theatre."

== Plot ==
The calm of a peaceful English village is shattered when a series of anonymous letters starts being delivered to village homes, containing scurrilous allegations about the recipients and their families. Upstanding and respectable inhabitants find themselves and their loved ones accused in lascivious detail of all manner of moral, sexual and criminal misdeeds. The Reverend Rider and his sister Mary attempt to defuse the increasing consternation of the villagers by pointing out that the letters should be ignored as the malicious nonsense they are. Their efforts meet with little success, and Rider's daughter Ann also becomes a target with lewd accusations being made about her fiancé David.

As the letters continue to arrive with ever more outlandish content, the social fabric of the village starts to fall apart. The letters all bear the local postmark, and people start to look suspiciously at their friends and neighbours, wondering who could be behind the campaign. Despite Rider's insistence that the contents of the letters should be disregarded, some notice that the letter-writer seems to have a very detailed knowledge of their personal circumstances, and start to question whether there may be a grain of truth in what is being written. Personal relationships too come under strain.

Soon the entire village is overtaken by suspicion and paranoia, and fingers start to point at Connie Fateley, a shy young seamstress who lives alone and does not tend to socialise. Convinced that hers is exactly the kind of personality that would find vent in a malicious poison-pen campaign, the villagers turn against Connie, openly accusing her of being the guilty party and ostracising her from village life. Tragedy follows when the despairing Connie hangs herself from the bellrope in the village church.

Rider preaches a sermon in which he expresses his disgust with his congregation for having driven Connie to suicide without a shred of evidence against her. Most, however, believe privately that Connie's death was an admission of guilt and feel relief that the ordeal is over. But letters are soon arriving again and the police become involved, keeping watch on local letterboxes in an attempt to catch the culprit. David now starts to receive letters detailing Ann's alleged infidelity, and unstable villager Sam Hurrin is targeted with information that his wife Sucal is dallying behind his back with local shopkeeper Len Griffin. After drinking himself into a rage, Hurrin goes out to confront Griffin and shoots him fatally.

The police now begin a round-the-clock surveillance of all letterboxes in the village, the collected letters are analysed and everyone who has been recorded as posting a letter is required to provide the address on the envelope. A handwriting expert is also brought in. The investigations lead in a surprising direction, towards Mary, the vicar's sister and a respected community member who has managed to hide a severely disturbed mind behind a mask of caring efficiency. Realising that the net is finally closing in, the perpetrator descends into a destructive mental frenzy before fatally jumping from a cliff above a local quarry.

== Cast ==
- Flora Robson as Mary Rider
- Reginald Tate as Reverend Rider
- Ann Todd as Ann Rider
- Robert Newton as Sam Hurrin
- Belle Chrystall as Sucal Hurrin
- Geoffrey Toone as David
- Catherine Lacey as Connie Fateley
- Edward Chapman as Len Griffin
- Edward Rigby as Badham
- Cyril Chamberlain as Peter Cashelton
- Athole Stewart as Colonel Cashelton
- Mary Hinton as Mrs Cashelton
- Wally Patch as Mr Suggs
- Ella Retford as Mrs Suggs
- Wilfrid Hyde-White as postman
- Esma Cannon as Mrs Warren
- Marjorie Rhodes as Mrs Scaife
- Beatrice Varley as Mrs Jenkins
- Roddy Hughes as graphologist
- Kenneth Connor as post office boy
- Megs Jenkins as barmaid
- Roddy McDowall as choirboy (uncredited)

== Reception ==
The Monthly Film Bulletin wrote: "This dramatic and unusual story is put over forcefully. The pathological aspect of the subject is balanced by the interest of the problem as to the identity of the letter-writer. A realistic atmosphere is skilfully created by a wealth of detail showing village life. The opening is quiet. Suspense is well maintained, and the climax is gripping and tragic. Flora Robson gives a restrained and artistic performance as the unhappy woman, and makes her intelligible if not easily forgiven. The remaining characters are types rather than individuals, and are cleverly etched in by a thoroughly competent supporting cast."

Graham Greene, writing inThe Spectator, called the film "a deplorable example of an English film which tries to create an English atmosphere."

Variety wrote: "An almost photographic replica of the stage play which enjoyed a modest London success last year. Not a savory subject, with no happy ending to give it uplift, and most likely to appeal to local audiences with a taste for unrelieved misery."

Flm historian David Quinlan called the film a "slow, sordid but striking dark drama."

Critic Raymond Durgnat called it "a bleak story prefiguring Clouzot's Le Corbeau."
