= How Green Was My Valley (1975 TV series) =

- Genre: Drama adaptation
- Based on: How Green Was My Valley by Richard Llewellyn
- Written by: Elaine Morgan
- Directed by: Ronald Wilson
- Starring: Stanley Baker; Siân Phillips; Nerys Hughes
- Country of origin: United Kingdom
- Original language: English
- No. of series: 1
- No. of episodes: 6

Production
- Producer: Martin Lisemore
- Camera setup: multi-camera video/location film
- Running time: 50 mins. (approx.)
- Production company: BBC/20th Century Fox Television

Original release
- Network: BBC 2
- Release: 29 December 1975 – 2 February 1976

How Green Was My Valley is a six-part BBC Television serial based on the novel by Richard Llewellyn, and features one of the last performances by Stanley Baker. It was first shown in the UK from 29 December 1975 in six weekly parts. Producer Martin Lisemore also cast Siân Phillips in his next production, I Claudius (1976). Phillips won a BAFTA award for best actress in 1976 for her portrayal of Beth Morgan. The series was co-produced by 20th Century Fox as they owned the rights to the novel and had produced the 1941 film.

== Plot synopsis ==
Set in South Wales during the reign of Queen Victoria, the story of the Morgans, a coal-mining family, is told. The story centres around Huw, the youngest boy, whose academic ability enables him to consider a future away from the mines in which his father and five brothers toil. Huw has a life-changing experience after his father is trapped in a mine cave-in.

== Cast ==
- Stanley Baker as Gwilym Morgan
- Siân Phillips as Beth Morgan
- Dominic Guard as Huw Morgan
- Rhys Powys as Young Huw Morgan
- Nerys Hughes as Bronwen Morgan
- Norman Comer as Ifor Morgan
- Keith Drinkel as Ianto Morgan
- Mike Gwilym as Owen Morgan
- Sue Jones-Davies as Angharad Morgan
- Gareth Thomas as Rev. Gruffydd
- Sheila Ruskin as Blodwen Evans
- Clifford Rose as Mr Jonas
- Aubrey Richards as Elias
- John Clive as Cyfartha
- Ray Smith as Dai Bando

== Production ==
It was one of the last appearances by Stanley Baker.
