= Up, into the Singing Mountain =

1960 novel by Richard Llewellyn

Up, Into The Singing Mountain
- First edition
- Author: Richard Llewellyn
- Cover artist: 'Harvey'
- Language: English
- Genre: Historical fiction
- Publisher: Michael Joseph
- Publication date: 1960
- Publication place: United Kingdom
- Media type: Print (hardcover)
- OCLC: 12520637
- Preceded by: How Green Was My Valley
- Followed by: Down Where the Moon is Small (1966)

Up, Into The Singing Mountain is a 1960 novel by Richard Llewellyn, and a sequel to his 1939 novel, How Green Was My Valley.

The novel tells the story of Huw Morgan's emigration to Patagonia.

== Plot summary ==
Leaving South Wales, Huw travels to Liverpool where he boards the ship Geraint and travels to the Welsh-speaking colony of Patagonia, Argentina.

Settling in the City of Lewis, Huw sets up a workshop, funded by his landlady, Widow Morwen Gwyn, and has success making furniture and fittings for houses. Huw meets the Corwen family, consisting of a widowed man with three daughters, the eldest of whom, Lal, Huw falls in love with. She is hesitant to marry him and her violent father, Vrann, has plans to marry her off to other farmers to get their land. As time passes, Huw encounters similar prejudices as those found at home in Wales from the religious elders of the city, known as 'The Twelve'.

Despite being in love with Lal, he begins a sexual relationship with Morwen. Lal becomes distant with him and Morwen expects marriage. When Huw refuses to marry her, Morwen throws him out of her house.

Setting up a workshop elsewhere, Huw is reconciled with Lal and they talk of marriage, though Lal wants her share of the family farm agreeing first. Huw finds himself clashing with The Twelve and his progress in buying land for a farm impeded. After threatening a farmer who Huw thought was trying to cheat him over the sale of his farm, Huw is summoned to appear before The Twelve. They find Huw innocent of the charges put against him, but the votes were not unanimous.

The town is ravaged by a storm and flooding. Nelya Penninah tries to entice Huw by coming to his house needing help, but it turns out to be a trap and Matti Mumpo (her father, and one of the Twelve) bursts into the house. Mumpo wants to have Huw thrown out of the valley.

Later, Huw's horse has its tongue cut out, and a witness claims it was Nelya Penninah accompanied by a mysterious figure. That same night Huw meets up with Merddyn Gruffydd, who tells him that not only is Huw's sister Angharad Morgan Evans coming to Patagonia, but she is bringing Huw's sister-in-law Bronwyn Morgan, too.

Huw spends several days up at the Corwen farm, trying to reinforce the dam with scores of other locals to stop it from flooding the town. During this time, Morwen's sister arrives to say that Morwen thinks she is pregnant with his child. Huw meets with Morwen but refuses to marry her.

On his way back, Huw meets with a stranger who offers him money to marry Doli Corwen. Seeking out Lal's father, Huw's request to marry Lal is rejected. The next day, Huw is summoned to the Corwen farm but is attacked and knocked unconscious on his arrival. He wakes to find himself, tied up and a prisoner of Vrann Corwen, along with his three daughters who have been whipped by Vrann.

Vrann tries to kill Huw, but is stopped by Ithel and Michaye. The girls are released and tell their father they want nothing to do with him. The dam bursts shortly afterwards, flooding parts of the valley and city below.

Lal's sister, Doli, and her friend Kankel are arrested for cutting the tongue of the horse belonging to Mari Ann Gwythir and are imprisoned, despite protesting their innocence. Huw, along with Lal and some others, go to the prison to break out Doli and Kankel, but when they get there they interrupt a meeting of The Twelve. Huw, Lal and the others are remanded to stay in prison until the following day whilst investigations take place, but afterwards, are allowed to sneak out on the condition they are back for the morning.

Huw meets with Matti Mumpo, who tells Huw he wants to marry Lal. When Huw catches up with Lal she says she will marry Matti in the morning and then move to Buenos Aires as her father has gambled away the farm and Lal wants them to have something to own. Later, Huw hears a commotion and sees Nelya Peninnah being brought in, restrained and on the back of a horse. Matti Mumpo rushes out to meet her but is killed by the crowd.

Huw announces he will move to the Andes. He sets off the next day with Lal and some other families for the City of Mill.

== Characters ==
- Huw Morgan, the narrator
- Merddyn Gruffydd, a former preacher who Huw knew from his childhood in Wales. Gruffydd left for Patagonia when rumours about him and Huw's sister, Angharad Morgan Evans, spread around their village in Wales.
- Morwen Glyn, a widow who Huw lodges with in the City of Lewis and whose land Huw builds his workshop upon.
- Mari Ann Gwythir, sister to Morwen Glyn, a woman from Wales who has lived in Patagonia for 35 years. Huw meets her when he first arrives.
- Vrann Corwen, a wealthy farmer and landowner.
- Lal Corwen, daughter of Vrann.
- Doli Corwen, sister of Lal.
- Solva Corwen, youngest sister of Lal.
- Matithiah Morse, one of The Twelve, nicknamed Matti Mumpo.
- Nelya Penninah, daughter of Matti Mumpo.

== Sequels ==
The author continued the story of Huw Morgan's life in two further sequels:

- Down Where the Moon is Small (1966) – Huw's life in Argentina
- Green, Green My Valley Now (1975) – Huw returns to Wales
