= A Time for Singing =

- Original Cast Album
- Music: John Morris
- Lyrics: Gerald Freedman and John Morris
- Book: Gerald Freedman and John Morris
- Basis: Richard Llewellyn's novel How Green Was My Valley
- Productions: 1966 Broadway

A Time for Singing is a musical with music by John Morris, lyrics by Gerald Freedman and John Morris, and a book by Freedman and Morris. The work was based on Richard Llewellyn's novel of a Welsh mining village, How Green Was My Valley. The show takes place in the memory of Protestant minister David Griffith, recalling conflict within the Morgan family over the possible formation of a miners' union within the village, and the romance between Griffith himself and Angharad of the Morgans, who ultimately marries the mine owner instead. The show starred Ivor Emmanuel (as David Griffith), Tessie O'Shea, Shani Wallis and Laurence Naismith.

The original Broadway production began a series of ten previews at The Broadway Theatre on May 12, 1966, and opened officially on May 21, 1966, running for a total of only 41 performances. It closed on June 25, 1966.

An Alexander H. Cohen production, it has been called "probably the best musical he ever produced." Cohen used an "extravagant publicity machine" to bring attention to the show, with the first 100 ticket buyers receiving "folding chairs and a picnic lunch catered by the Brasserie restaurant." Ken Mandelbaum argued that A Time for Singing pointed the way to later grand musicals like Les Misérables and Grand Hotel in both its staging and its music, which was "richer and more serious" than other shows of the period, with a "cinematic fluidity and continuous movement" that later became common in 1980s musicals.

Theatre Historian Gerald Bordman, however, acknowledged the musical's "fine choral singing" but stated that the music the singers were given was drab and did little to enhance the grim story of the Morgan family's tribulations".

Bing Crosby recorded two songs from A Time for Singing for Reprise Records on May 9, 1966, with the Johnny Keating Orchestra and Chorus: "Far From Home" and "How Green Was My Valley." They were released as a single. Stereo versions of the songs were released in 2010. A remastered CD of the original Broadway cast recording was issued in a limited edition by producer Bruce Kimmel on his Kritzerland label on April 3, 2013.

== Song list ==
Act I

- Come You Men – Male Singing Chorus
- How Green Was My Valley – David Griffith and Chorus
- Old Long John – Male Singing Chorus
- Here Come Your Men – Male Singing Chorus
- What a Good Day Is Saturday – Beth Morgan, Gwillym Morgan, Angharad Morgan, Brothers and Company
- Peace Come to Every Heart – Company
- Someone Must Try – David Griffith
- Oh, How I Adore Your Name – Angharad Morgan
- That's What Young Ladies Do – David Griffith
- When He Looks At Me – Angharad Morgan
- Far From Home – Beth Morgan, Angharad Morgan, Gwillym Morgan and Brothers
- I Wonder If – Brothers
- What A Party – Gwillym Morgan, David Griffith, Cyfartha Lewis, Dai Bando and Brothers
- Let Me Love You – Angharad Morgan
- Why Would Anyone Want to Get Married? – Huw Morgan, Brothers, Beth Morgan and Gwillym Morgan
- A Time For Singing – Beth Morgan and Company

Act II

- When the Baby Comes – Company
- I'm Always Wrong – Angharad Morgan
- There is Beautiful You Are – David Griffith
- Three Ships – Beth Morgan, Bronwen Jenkins, Ivor Morgan and Company
- Tell Her – Huw Morgan and Gwillym Morgan
- There Is Beautiful You Are (Reprise) – David Griffith
- Let Me Love You (Reprise) – Angharad Morgan and David Griffith
- And The Mountains Sing Back – David Griffith
- Gone in Sorrow – Company
- How Green Was My Valley (Reprise) – Company
