= Ivor Emmanuel =

Welsh singer (1927–2007)

Background information
- Born: Ivor Lewis Emmanuel; 7 November 1927; Margam, Port Talbot, Wales
- Died: 20 July 2007 (aged 79) Málaga, Spain
- Occupations: Singer, actor
- Instrument: Vocals
- Years active: 1948–2006
- Spouses: Jane Beazleigh (m. 1951, divorced) Patricia Bredin (m. 1964, divorced) Malinee Oppenborn (m. 1967)

Ivor Lewis Emmanuel (7 November 1927 – 20 July 2007) was a Welsh musical theatre and television singer and actor. He is probably best remembered, however, for his appearance as Private Owen in the 1964 film Zulu, in which his character rallies outnumbered British soldiers by leading them in the stirring Welsh battle hymn "Men of Harlech" to counter the Zulu war chants.

After losing his parents at an early age, Emmanuel began working as a coal miner. He developed a keen interest in music and singing, however, and was drawn to the stage. At the age of 20, he had his first professional theatre job in the musical Oklahoma!. He served as a chorister for the D'Oyly Carte Opera Company in 1950–1951 but soon went on to play small roles in the West End productions of South Pacific, The King and I and Plain and Fancy. His first leading role was Joe Hardy in Damn Yankees (1957), followed by a tour as Woody Mahoney in Finian's Rainbow. In 1966, he appeared on Broadway in A Time for Singing and then in the West End in 110 in the Shade. He continued to play in summer seasons of theatre and in cabaret and variety into the 1980s.

During the late 1950s, he participated in the Welsh language singing television programme Dewch i Mewn, and from 1958 to 1964 was lead singer on the TWW show, Gwlad y Gan (Land of Song), among other TV shows. In 1960, he performed in the first televised edition of the Royal Variety Performance. He continued to perform on TV through the 1970s. He also performed in concerts and is heard on cast recordings of Show Boat, Kiss Me, Kate, The King and I and A Time for Singing. He is also featured on the box set The Greatest Musicals of the 20th Century, on the 1966 RCA Victrola recording of The Pirates of Penzance, and in a solo album, The Best of Ivor Emmanuel.

== Life and career ==
Emmanuel was born in Margam, near Port Talbot, Wales, and moved to the nearby village of Pontrhydyfen as a young child. He was 14 years old when his father, mother, sister and grandfather were killed by a stray bomb that hit their village during World War II. A 2001 documentary programme about the incident was made by S4C (Sianel Pedwar Cymru). His aunt Flossie took him in (his younger brother John lived with an uncle), and he began working in the coal mine like his father and grandfather before him.

Emmanuel developed a keen interest in music and singing and was a member of Pontrhydyfen Operatic Society. He used to carry a wind-up gramophone up nearby mountains to listen to recordings of Enrico Caruso.

=== Stage career ===
At the age of 20, Emmanuel unsuccessfully auditioned for The D'Oyly Carte Opera Company. He took solace by drinking with an old friend, Richard Burton, who was performing in The Lady's Not for Burning at the time in London, and telling him how desperate he was to break into show business. Two weeks later, a telegram arrived from Burton telling him to be at the Theatre Royal, Drury Lane the following day for an audition. He was cast in the musical Oklahoma!.

Emmanuel was eventually hired by the D'Oyly Carte Opera Company as a chorister in March 1950, staying until August 1951 when he married fellow D'Oyly Carte chorister Jane Beazleigh. He was assigned the small role of Associate in Trial by Jury and shared the larger one of Luiz in The Gondoliers. He and Beazleigh had two children, a girl and a boy.

Emmanuel's masculine looks and ringing baritone voice suited him for musicals, and he soon took principal roles in the West End. At the Drury Lane, he played Sgt. Kenneth Johnson in the hit production of South Pacific (1951–53), then played small roles in two more long-running shows, The King and I and Plain and Fancy. At the London Coliseum, he finally got a leading role, playing Joe Hardy in Damn Yankees (1957) and then played Woody Mahoney in Finian's Rainbow in Liverpool and on a short tour. In the early 1960s, Emmanuel continued to perform in pantomime and cabaret. In 1966, he appeared on Broadway as Mr. Gruffydd, the minister, in A Time for Singing, a musical version of Richard Llewellyn's novel How Green Was My Valley, but the show ran for only 41 performances. The following year he played his last West End role in 110 in the Shade, at the Palace Theatre. He continued to play in summer seasons of theatre and in cabaret and variety, particularly at holiday resorts, into the 1980s.

=== Concerts, recordings, broadcast and film ===
Emmanuel also had a successful career as a popular concert and recording artist and television personality. During the late 1950s, he made his breakthrough into television. He took part in a Welsh language singing programme called Dewch i Mewn and from 1958 to 1964 was lead singer on the TWW show, Gwlad y Gan (Land of Song), acting as an older brother figure for the Pontcanna Children's Choir. The show was broadcast across the UK once a month and regularly attracted an audience of some ten million people, helping to popularize the Welsh language. Emmanuel later performed on, and was an interviewer for, other TWW shows.

In May 1960, Emmanuel performed in the first televised edition of the Royal Variety Performance. Other performers at that performance included The Crazy Gang, Benny Hill, Frankie Howerd, Vera Lynn, Sammy Davis Jr., Nat King Cole and Liberace. He continued, through the 1970s, to make numerous television appearances.

Emmanuel's record output included the 1959 studio cast recordings of Show Boat, Kiss Me, Kate and The King and I, and the 1966 Broadway original cast recording of A Time for Singing as David Griffith (Gruffydd). He is also featured on the five-disc box set, The Greatest Musicals of the 20th Century, where it says of him, "one singer who really stands out on this volume is the Welsh baritone Ivor Emmanuel .... [h]e was of the same era and very much in the fine tradition of the great American musical theatre baritones: Howard Keel, John Raitt and Gordon Macrae." He was featured as Frederic on the 1966 RCA Victrola recording of The Pirates of Penzance, which starred Martyn Green. He also made his own album of 24 songs, The Best of Ivor Emmanuel.

In 1964, Emmanuel appeared as "Private Owen" in the epic film Zulu, which launched the career of Michael Caine. Emmanuel's character rallies the outnumbered British soldiers on the barricade at Rorke's Drift in 1879 by leading the men in the stirring Welsh battle hymn Men of Harlech to counter the Zulu war chants. The same year, he married actress Patricia Bredin, but they had no children, and the marriage ended in divorce less than two years later. He later married Malinee Oppenborn, and the couple had a daughter in 1978.

=== Retirement and death ===
Emmanuel retired to a quiet life in Benalmadena, a village near Málaga on Spain's Costa del Sol, in 1984 with his wife. There he was filmed for an HTV television profile, It's My Life: Man of Song (broadcast on 14 July 1997). In 1991, Emmanuel lost his life's savings of £220,000 in the collapse of the Bank of Credit and Commerce International. In 2006, he appeared in a BBC TV documentary with fellow Welsh singer Bryn Terfel. Emmanuel died of a stroke in Málaga, aged 79. He was survived by his wife, Malinee, and his three children.

== Filmography ==
Year	Title	Role	Notes
1964	Zulu	Private Owen	
