= None but the Lonely Heart (novel) =

1943 novel

- First edition
- Author: Richard Llewellyn
- Language: English
- Genre: Drama
- Publisher: Michael Joseph
- Publication date: 1943
- Publication place: United Kingdom
- Media type: Print

None but the Lonely Heart is a 1943 novel by the British writer Richard Llewellyn. It focuses on the life of Ernie Motts, who narrates the story from his own perspective, a wide boy from London. It was published four years after Llewellyn's best-known work, the Wales-set How Green Was My Valley.

== Film adaptation ==
In 1944 it was made into a film of the same title by the Hollywood studio RKO Pictures. Directed by Clifford Odets it starred Cary Grant as Ernie Mott along with Ethel Barrymore, Barry Fitzgerald and June Duprez. It was noted for its unusual subject matter, as most Hollywood films of the period portrayed Britain in a much more positive light.

== Bibliography ==
- Glancy, Mark. When Hollywood Loved Britain: The Hollywood 'British' Film 1939-1945. Manchester University Press, 1999.
- Goble, Alan. The Complete Index to Literary Sources in Film. Walter de Gruyter, 1999.
