= Denis Griffiths =

Welsh operatic singer

Denis Griffiths, tenor, publicity shot taken for use in BBC Radio Times, c.1950

Denis Griffiths (1922–2001) was a Welsh operatic tenor who regularly performed on BBC radio from the late 1940s onwards and who later featured among the soloists in the Independent Television series Gwlad y Gan which - as Land of Song - was networked to a wide audience throughout the country between 1958 and 1964. The musical show was made by TWW (Television Wales and the West) in Cardiff’s Pontcanna studios, and was designed to celebrate Wales within Wales and beyond.

== Land of Song ==
During its six-year run, Gwlad y Gan, or 'Land of Song', offered a Sunday evening entertainment based on Welsh music and song led by the baritone Ivor Emmanuel, who was already well known from his success in West End musicals on the London stage. Around Emmanuel were gathered a children’s chorus, an adult chorus and, from its ranks, a select group of male singers – Denis Griffiths, Bryn Williams, John Willams and Harry Price – who accompanied Emmanuel in a variety of set-pieces. Griffiths also sang regular solos, and was often paired in duet with the young soprano Sian Hopkins. The popularity of the show - regularly playing to ten million viewers at its peak - led to the release of two Land of Song records (Delysé EDPs 209 and 210), made in London in 1960 by the record producer Isabella Wallich. They sold very well and proved the first "big hit" for Wallich's fledgling Delysé label, reaching number 13 in the popular music charts of 1961.

== Life and career ==
Born and educated in Aberystwyth in Ceredigion, where he trained as an engineer, Denis Griffiths spent the war years in London, working for the General Electric Company in Wembley making precision parts for armaments as part of the war effort. While there he began his public singing career, performing in oratorios and other concerts. Moving back to Wales at the end of the war, he continued to pursue singing opportunities. Having taken singing lessons while in London, he now enrolled at the Cardiff College of Music (now the Royal Welsh College of Music & Drama) and, towards the end of 1947, successfully auditioned for the original BBC Welsh Chorus, founded by the BBC's Director of Music in Wales, Idris Lewis. The new Chorus, conducted by Arwel Hughes, was established to complement the BBC Welsh Orchestra which was reformed after the war, in 1946, at the instigation of Sir Adrian Boult. Both were cornerstones of the BBC's renewed commitment in the post-war years to the encouragement and promotion of sung excellence through its broadcasts to Wales and the UK.

== Singing on the radio ==
Griffiths's membership of the new BBC Welsh Chorus led rapidly to other broadcast work which included solo appearances in programmes for the BBC Light Programme such as Footlight Favourites and Memories Live Longer than Dreams, and for the BBC Welsh Home Service in musical and cultural anthologies such as Welsh Magazine, Their Songs and Ours, Welsh Song Recital, Country Magazine, Rhythm Rendezvous, and Sing Lads Sing. As a native Welsh speaker he was also in demand at the BBC as a singer in a variety of Welsh language musical broadcasts such as Hob Y Deri Dando, Dechrau’r Dydd and Bore Da.

His radio work during the 1950s included appearances as a soloist with popular singing groups of the time such as the Garth Players and he was, for a time, a member of the Lyrian Singers. He performed live broadcast recitals of light songs and favourite numbers from the shows, together with work by contemporary Welsh composers such as Mansel Thomas and Idris Lewis himself. His lyric style singled him out as a favoured soloist for specialised music programmes. In July 1953, for example, he sang in a tribute to a well-loved songwriter: Edward German – A Man and his Music was broadcast both on the BBC Welsh Home Service and on the General Overseas Service of the BBC. He also sang for the BBC Light Programme's Woman's Hour.

From 1951 onwards, he appeared in a variety of Welsh language educational broadcasts, including First Stages in Welsh and Second Stages in Welsh, and from 1957 became the resident tenor in the long-running educational radio series Sain Cerdd a Chan (‘Sound Story and Song’). Typically this programme brought together an intimate group of musicians (a singer, a pianist and, for example, a percussionist and glockenspiel player) to demonstrate songs in Welsh as an aid for school children to learn the language and to learn something about tonic sol fa and music-making in general.

By the mid-1950s, he was also appearing as a member of the BBC Welsh Singers (also known as the BBC Octet), a singing group retained by the BBC specifically to perform the music in its weekly religious broadcasts which included services and other meditative programmes such as Lighten Our Darkness. Consisting of two sopranos, two altos, two tenors and two basses, the typical character of the octet's work is reflected in an early notice seen in the BBC Annual Report: "The BBC Welsh Singers gave notable performances of a number of Bach cantatas sung in Welsh. Their quiet, nostalgic programmes of Welsh part-songs of the nineteenth century were especially popular." From 1964 Griffiths was the official secretary of the octet, but in 1957 it was his membership of that group that led directly to his involvement in TV's Land of Song. Through founder octet member and Cardiff music teacher Clifford Bunford, the BBC singers provided the core of the adult chorus recruited by ITV's music director Norman Whitehead for TWW's new Welsh musical show.

== After Land of Song ==
When Land of Song ended in 1964, Griffiths continued to sing for TWW. He was a regular tenor soloist on TV shows such as Y Caban Pren (‘The Wood Cabin’ or 'Log Cabin'), which was designed to continue the popular formula of well-loved musical numbers performed in a rustic setting. But by the late 1960s he had committed himself fully to his BBC radio singing work.

Outside of the BBC, Denis Griffiths was a long-standing member of the Cardiff Bach Choir (founded in 1962 by Clifford Bunford) and over many years sang tenor solos in the choir's presentations of the great oratorio works by Bach, Handel, Haydn, Mendelssohn, Stainer, Fauré and others in halls and churches throughout South Wales and in concerts given at Llandaff Cathedral in Cardiff.

Aside from his singing, he remained a skilled professional engineer, a maker of precision instruments, and throughout his musical career worked full-time for the NHS, becoming Chief Medical Physics Technician at Velindre Hospital in Whitchurch, Cardiff, where he fashioned a number of ground-breaking technical solutions to aid hospital and medical procedures. He continued singing for Sain Cerdd a Chan on BBC Radio right up until his retirement in 1984. At his death, in February 2001, he was survived by his wife of more than fifty years, Joyce, and their two sons, Huw and Peter.
