= How Green Was My Valley (film) =

1941 film by John Ford

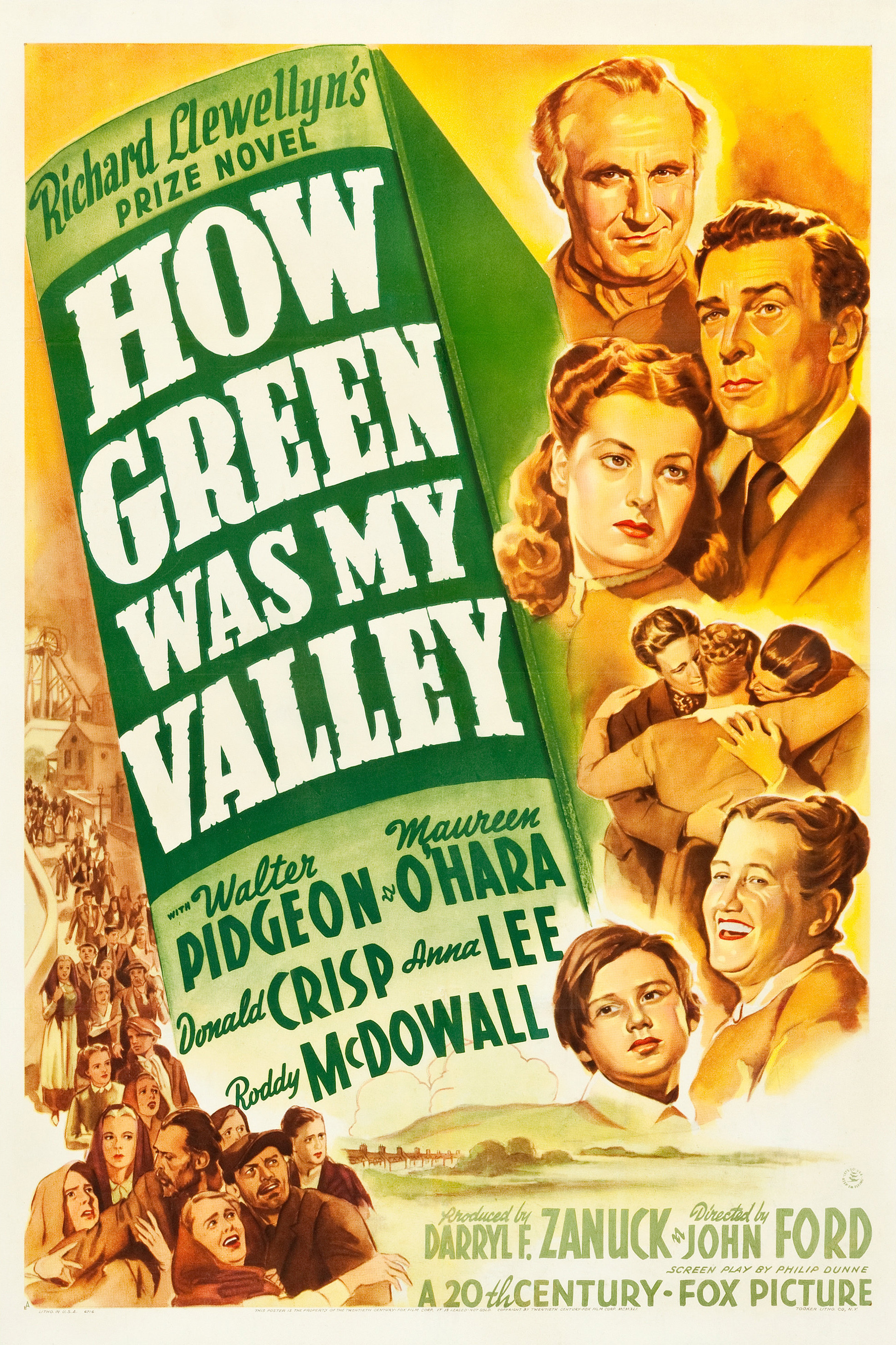
- Theatrical release poster
- Directed by: John Ford
- Screenplay by: Philip Dunne
- Based on: the novel by Richard Llewellyn
- Produced by: Darryl F. Zanuck
- Starring: Walter Pidgeon; Maureen O'Hara; Donald Crisp; Anna Lee; Roddy McDowall
- Cinematography: Arthur Miller, A.S.C.
- Edited by: James B. Clark
- Music by: Alfred Newman
- Production company: 20th Century-Fox
- Distributed by: 20th Century-Fox
- Release date: October 28, 1941
- Running time: 118 minutes
- Country: United States
- Languages: English; Welsh
- Budget: $800,000
- Box office: $2.4 million

How Green Was My Valley is a 1941 American drama film directed by John Ford, adapted by Philip Dunne from the 1939 novel of the same title by Richard Llewellyn. It stars Walter Pidgeon, Maureen O'Hara, Anna Lee, Donald Crisp, and a young Roddy McDowall.

It tells the story of the Morgans, a hard-working Welsh mining family, from the point of view of the youngest child, Huw, who lives with his affectionate and kind parents as well as his sister and five brothers, in the South Wales Valleys during the late Victorian era. The story chronicles life in the South Wales coalfields, the loss of that way of life and its effects on the family.

The fictional village in the film is based on Gilfach Goch, where Llewellyn spent many summers visiting his grandfather, and it served as the inspiration for the novel. The author had claimed that he based the book on his own personal experiences but this was found to be untrue after his death; Llewellyn was English-born and spent little time in Wales, though he was of Welsh descent. Llewellyn gathered material for the novel from conversations with local mining families in Gilfach Goch.

It was nominated for ten Academy Awards, winning five, famously beating Citizen Kane, Sergeant York and The Maltese Falcon for Best Picture, while Ford won for Best Director, Donald Crisp for Best Supporting Actor, Arthur Miller for Best Cinematography, and Richard Day, Nathan H. Juran and Thomas Little for Best Black-and-White Art Direction-Interior Decoration. In 1990, the film was selected for preservation in the United States National Film Registry of the Library of Congress as being "culturally, historically, or aesthetically significant". The Academy Film Archive preserved How Green Was My Valley in 1998.

== Plot ==
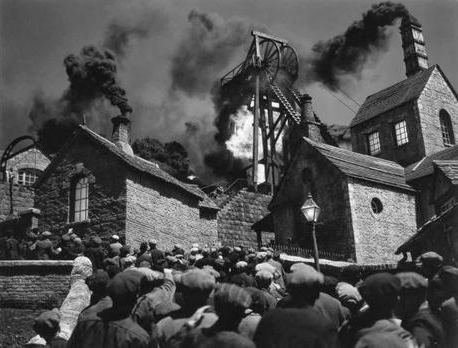
The Welsh mining village of How Green Was My Valley

The Morgans are a mining family in the South Wales Valleys during the late Victorian era. Huw is the youngest son of Gwilym and Beth Morgan. His older brothers, Ianto, Ivor, Davy, Gwilym Jr., and Owen, all work in the coal mines with their father, while sister Angharad keeps house with their mother. Huw's childhood is idyllic; the town, not yet overrun with mining spoil, is beautiful, the household is warm and loving, and the miners happily sing "Cwm Rhondda" as they return from work. Huw is smitten with Bronwyn, a girl engaged to be married to his eldest brother, Ivor. At the boisterous wedding party, Angharad meets the new preacher, Mr. Gruffydd, and there is an obvious mutual attraction.

Trouble begins when the miners strike in protest of lowered wages. Gwilym is estranged from the other miners when he refused to endorse the strike, and his older sons leave home. Beth interrupts a late night meeting of the strikers to threaten death on anyone who harms her husband. She and Huw get lost in a snowstorm returning home, and fall into the river. They are rescued by miners. Beth and Huw lose the use of their legs, and the doctor fears Huw will never walk again. He recovers with the help of Mr. Gruffydd, further endearing him to Angharad.

Gwilym and his sons reconcile when the strike is settled, but many miners have lost their jobs. Angharad is courted by the mine owner's son, Iestyn Evans (Marten Lamont), but loves Mr. Gruffydd. Though he shares her feelings, Gruffydd can't bear to subject her to the spartan life of an impoverished minister of religion and Angharad leaves the country in a loveless marriage to Evans. When Huw begins school he's abused by other boys, and taught to fight by boxer Dai Bando and his crony, Cyfartha. After Huw is beaten by a cruel teacher, Dai Bando avenges him in front of his class by demonstrating his boxing skills on the teacher.

Learning that Ivor has been killed in a mine accident forces Bronwyn into premature labour. Two of Morgan's sons are dismissed in favour of less experienced, lower paid miners and leave the country to find other work. Huw is awarded a scholarship to university, but, disappoints his father by refusing it to work in the mines. He relocates with Bronwyn, to help provide for her and her newborn son.

Angharad's return from Cape Town, without her husband, sends gossip of an impending divorce through the town and the Deacons – the governing council of the local Calvinistic Methodist chapel – meet to discuss her denunciation and excommunication. Mr. Gruffydd is enraged by the Deacons' small-mindedness and storms out before the meeting, intent on leaving town. That evening another mine accident injures several men and traps Gwilym and others under a cave-in. Young Huw, Mr. Gruffydd, Dai Bando and other volunteers rescue the survivors. Gwilym and his son are briefly re-united before he succumbs to his injuries.

The cold light of dawn reveals the Morgan women, Angharad, Bronwyn and Beth, have stood vigil all night. The sound of the pulley announces the lift is returning from the mine's depths. Huw, with his coal-blackened face, is cradling his father's body.

== Cast ==
- Walter Pidgeon as Mr. Gruffydd
- Maureen O'Hara as Angharad
- Anna Lee as Bronwyn
- Donald Crisp as Mr. Morgan
- Roddy McDowall as Huw
- John Loder as Ianto
- Sara Allgood as Mrs. Morgan
- Barry Fitzgerald as Cyfartha
- Patric Knowles as Ivor
- Welsh Singers as Themselves
- Morton Lowry as Mr. Jonas
- Arthur Shields as Mr. Parry
- Ann Todd as Ceinwen
- Frederick Worlock as Dr. Richards
- Richard Fraser as Davy Morgan
- Evan S. Evans as Gwilym
- James Monks as Owen
- Rhys Williams as Dai Bando
- Lionel Pape as Evans
- Ethel Griffies as Mrs. Nicholas
- Marten Lamont as Iestyn Evans

== Production ==
The script was written by Philip Dunne. He later recalled reading the original novel "in horror, turgid stuff, long speeches about Welsh coal miners on strike."

William Wyler, the original director, saw the screen test of McDowall and chose him for the part. Wyler was replaced by John Ford. Fox wanted to shoot the movie in Wales in Technicolor, but it was impossible to do so during World War II. Instead, Ford had the studio build an 80-acre representation of a typical Welsh mining town at Brent's Crags (subsequently Crags Country Club) in the Santa Monica Mountains near Malibu, California.

John Ford originally hired Rhys Williams, the film's Welsh dialect coach, to record the film's narration as Older Huw. Shortly before release, he had the narration re-dubbed by Irving Pichel, afraid that audiences might recognize Williams' voice from his onscreen role as Dai Bando and be confused. Williams' narration was still used in some prints of the film, including the original British release, and he's credited as such on some secondary sources.

== Reception ==
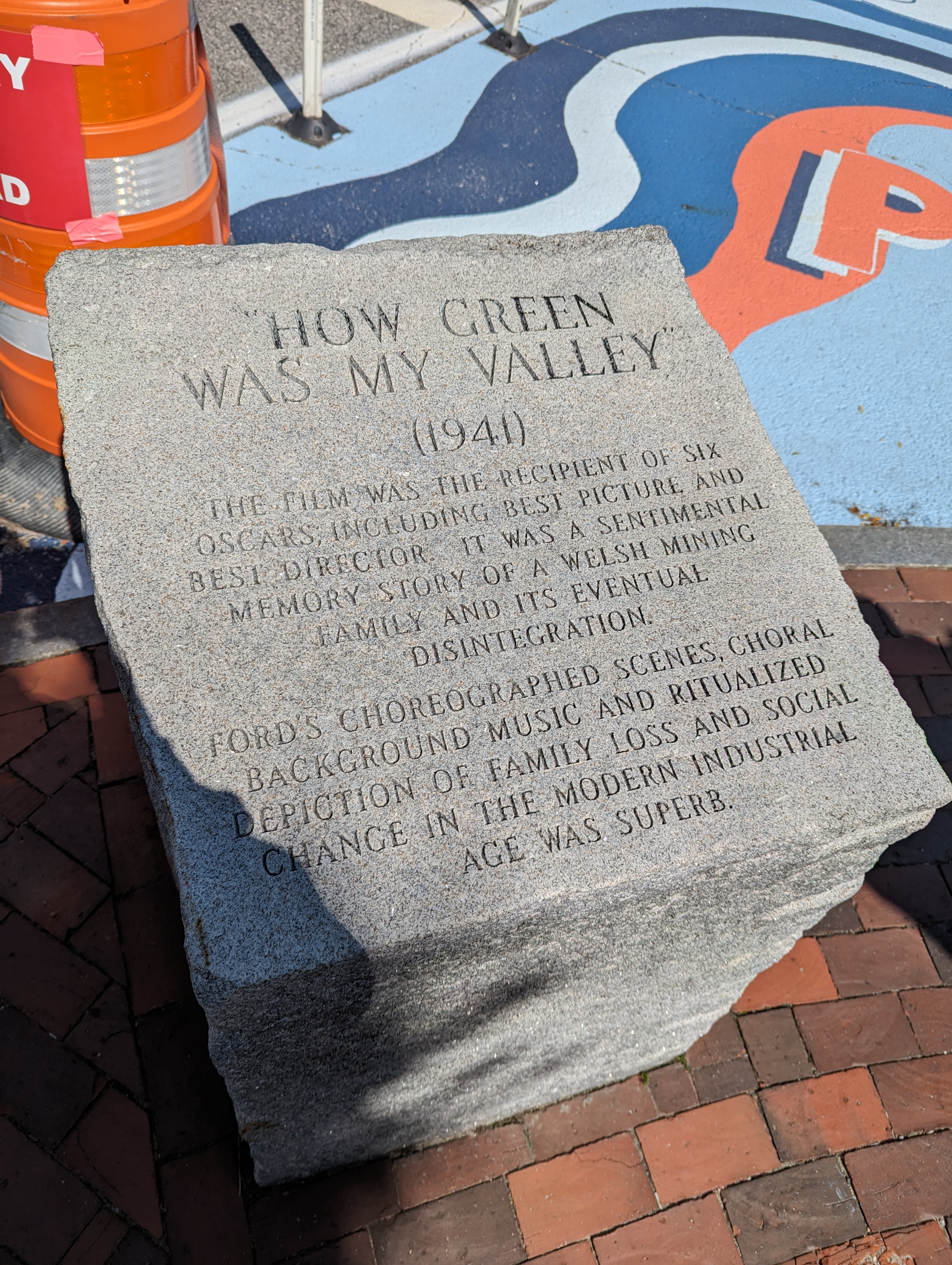
Stone inscription for How Green Was My Valley at Ford's statue in Portland, Maine.

In his October 29, 1941 review in The New York Times, Bosley Crowther praised the production as "a motion picture of great poetic charm and dignity, a picture rich in visual fabrication and in the vigor of its imagery, and one which may truly be regarded as an outstanding film of the year." On review aggregator Rotten Tomatoes, How Green Was My Valley held, as of August 2026, an approval rating of 93% based on 89 reviews, with an average rating of 8.0/10. The site's critics consensus reads: "Nostalgic without becoming maudlin, this working-class drama is enlivened by a terrific cast and John Ford's ineffable directorial eye." On Metacritic, the film holds a weighted average score of 88 out of 100 based on 17 critics, indicating "universal acclaim". Tim Dirks of Filmsite lauded the film as "one of John Ford's masterpieces of sentimental human drama."

While the opinion among the Academy Awards committee that it was 1941's Best Picture has been disputed by some later critics, How Green Was My Valley continues to be well received in its own right and, in 1990, was added to the American National Film Registry. Academy Award-winning actor and director Clint Eastwood named it as one of his favorite movies. The film has been criticized in the UK for the actors' poor accents.

== Accolades ==
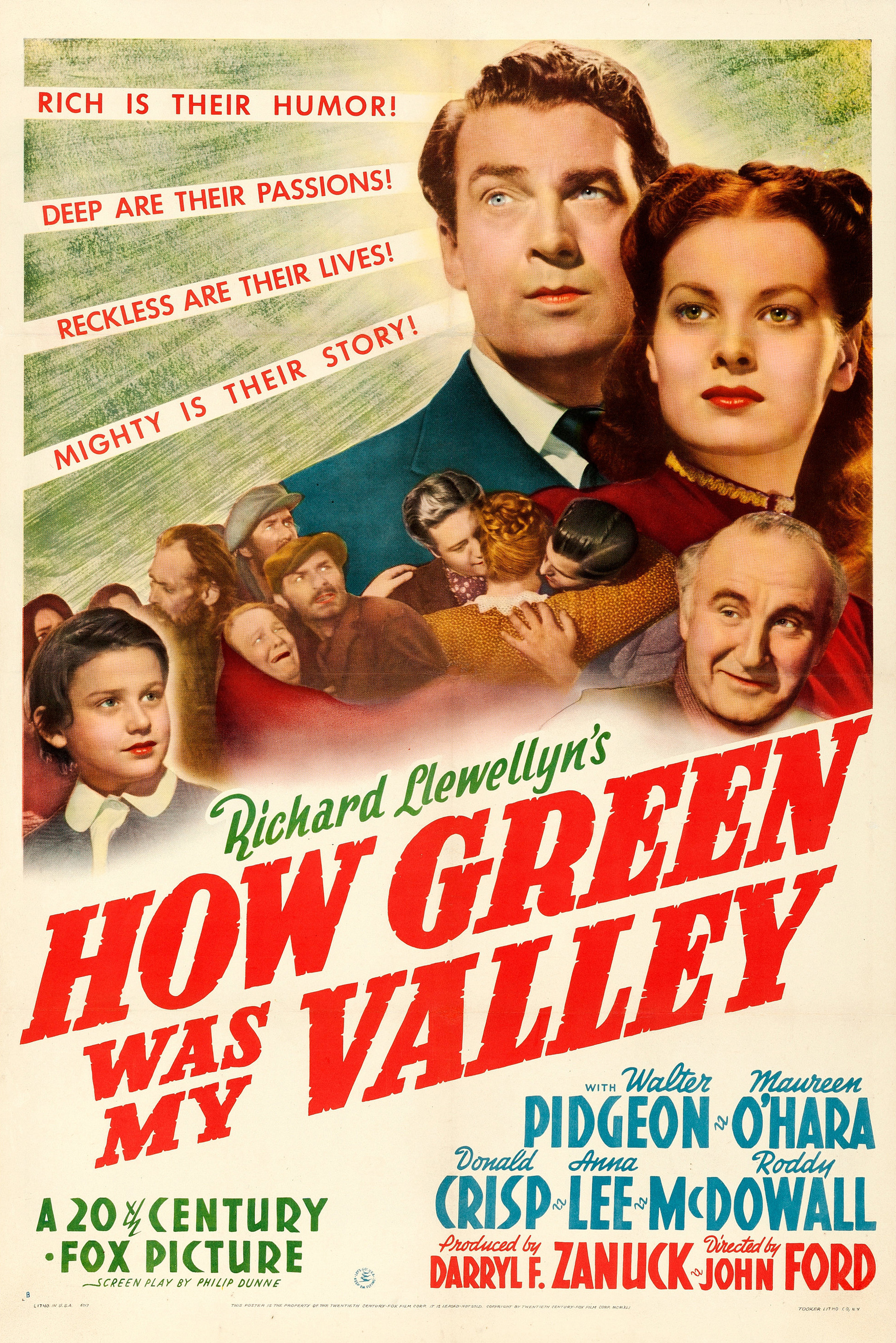
Alternate "Style B" theatrical poster

Award	Category	Nominee	Result
Academy Awards	Outstanding Motion Picture	Darryl F. Zanuck	Won
Academy Awards	Best Director	John Ford	Won
Academy Awards	Best Supporting Actor	Donald Crisp	Won
Academy Awards	Best Supporting Actress	Sara Allgood	Nominated
Academy Awards	Best Screenplay	Philip Dunne	Nominated
Academy Awards	Best Art Direction-Interior Decoration – Black-and-White	Richard Day, Nathan Juran and Thomas Little	Won
Academy Awards	Best Cinematography – Black-and-White	Arthur Miller	Won
Academy Awards	Best Film Editing	James B. Clark	Nominated
Academy Awards	Best Scoring of a Dramatic Picture	Alfred Newman	Nominated
Academy Awards	Best Sound Recording	Edmund H. Hansen	Nominated
Argentine Film Critics Association Awards	Best Foreign Film	John Ford	Won
National Film Preservation Board	National Film Registry		Inducted
New York Film Critics Circle Awards	Best Director	John Ford	Won

=== American Film Institute lists ===
- AFI's 100 Years...100 Movies – Nominated
- AFI's 100 Years...100 Movie Quotes:
  - "Men like my father cannot die. They are with me still -- real in memory as they were in flesh, loving and beloved forever. How green was my valley then." – Nominated
- AFI's 100 Years of Film Scores – Nominated
- AFI's 100 Years...100 Movies (10th Anniversary Edition) – Nominated

== Adaptations ==
How Green Was My Valley was adapted as a half-hour radio play on the March 22, 1942, broadcast of The Screen Guild Theater, with Sara Allgood, Donald Crisp, Roddy McDowall, Maureen O'Hara and Walter Pidgeon.

It was also adapted for three one-hour broadcasts of the Lux Radio Theatre: on September 21, 1942, with Allgood, Crisp, O'Hara, McDowall and Pidgeon; on March 31, 1947, with Crisp and David Niven; and on September 28, 1954, with Crisp and Donna Reed.

== See also ==
- How Green Was My Valley (novel)
- The Proud Valley
- The Stars Look Down
- 1926 United Kingdom general strike
- English-language accents in film – Welsh
- Aberfan disaster
