= Gwlad y Gân =

Welsh language ITV television series

Gwlad y Gân (English: Land of Song) is a monthly television series that was broadcast on the United Kingdom television network ITV from 1958 to 1964. Featuring traditional Welsh music and song, with costumed performers and choreography, the programme went out on early Sunday evenings.

The series, starring Welsh baritone Ivor Emmanuel and supporting cast, expressed a set of ‘feel-good’ values that were wholesome, folksy, rustic, fun-loving and family-oriented. With a solid foundation of musical excellence and a respect for a Welsh musical tradition that held significance for an entire generation, the show caught a mood and struck a chord as it aimed to celebrate Wales within Wales and beyond. Broadcast in Welsh (but with bilingual captions on screen and bilingual voiced-over links), Land of Song was made in Cardiff by Television Wales and the West (TWW) and then distributed or ‘networked’ to ITV stations serving many parts of the country, thus reaching a nationwide audience which, in the early 1960s, peaked at around ten million viewers. The Television Act 1954, which created the UK's second television channel, Independent Television (ITV), prohibited broadcasting on Sundays between 18:15 and 19:15 - unless the programmes were religious or in the Welsh language. The BBC carried religious programmes at this time, so the choice for viewers was dire. The ITV used the Television Act's loophole to transmit throughout the UK a programme in Welsh. Since it was mostly singing, it did not matter that most viewers (including in Wales) did not understand it. Having no competition, it drew very large audiences. The downside was that advertising was not permitted: so the various companies of the ITV network were paying TWW in Cardiff for a programme which generated no income. The upside was that it pulled viewers away from the BBC and, in an era before TV-remote-controls, delivered a large audience to the first entertainment programme, with commercials, at 19:15.

== ITV’s answer to the Mitchell Minstrels ==
Independent television had been on air in the UK for less than three years when the new TWW company won the franchise to broadcast to Wales and the West of England, beginning its transmissions on 14 January 1958. TWW formed a commitment to broadcasting some programmes in Welsh, and another of its main aims was to provide popular entertainment that could compete with anything produced by the BBC. Gwlad y Gan / Land of Song was conceived to meet both objectives.

When Land of Song began in 1958, its only direct rival in providing musical variety on TV was the BBC's The Black and White Minstrel Show. The Mitchell Minstrels had gained instant popularity from their first appearance in a one-off special in 1957, going on to become perennial favourites well into the 1970s. But unlike the BBC programme, TWW's Land of Song ignored the Broadway–West End canon of ‘songs from the shows’ and sought instead to specifically showcase the traditional music of its region of origin. It drew on folk tunes, traditional songs, ballads, and Welsh hymns, performed by a children's choir and an adult chorus, together with a select group of soloists. So well did this formula work that, by the early 1960s, many of them had become household names and faces.

== The star ==
Welsh baritone Ivor Emmanuel (1927–2007) was "one of Britain's most popular singing stars of the 1950s and 1960s" and is widely remembered for his role leading the ‘Men of Harlech’ battle hymn on the barricades in the 1964 film Zulu. Born in Margam but raised in Pontrhydyfen near Port Talbot, he began his singing career in the theatres of South Wales in the late 40s. In 1950 he won a part in the musical Oklahoma! in London's West End, and also joined the D’Oyly Carte Opera Company chorus, appearing in a number of Savoy productions. Through the 1950s he added to his success on the West End stage with appearances in South Pacific (1951–53) at the Theatre Royal, Drury Lane, The King and I and Plain and Fancy (1956), also at Drury Lane, and Damn Yankees (1957) at the Coliseum. He came to the attention of ITV producer Chris Mercer and musical director Norman Whitehead and, after a successful appearance in the Welsh language musical TV programme Dewch i Mewn, he was cast as the singing lead of Gwlad Y Gan / Land of Song.

== The chorus ==
Producer Chris Mercer and Music Director Norman Whitehead (who had worked in London with bandleader Jack Hylton and was known as an excellent arranger of music) settled on the idea of using a local children's choir to accompany Ivor Emmanuel in a variety of musical settings. They turned for help to Clifford Bunford, a talented tenor in his own right and a founder member of the BBC Octet (also known as the BBC Welsh Singers). Then Music Master at Cathays High School in Cardiff, Bunford was well known for his energetic work with youth and adult choirs. Through him, a dozen boys were selected from the Cathays school choir and the group was supplemented by schoolgirls chosen from elsewhere in Cardiff, including a handful of the best from the choir at Canton High School and a few from the Llandaff Cathedral Parish Choir. The young chorus became known as the ‘Pontcanna Children’s Choir’, named after the TWW studios at Pontcanna in Cardiff where Land of Song was staged for broadcast.

In addition, around five members of the BBC Octet ("BBC Welsh Singers") were drafted in to provide a disciplined musical core. Cliff Bunford, himself a talented tenor, was one of them, as was his fellow octet tenor Denis Griffiths. Along with them came baritone Bryn Williams and sopranos Esme Lewis and Ann Davies. This group was supplemented by additional altos, one of whom was Madelaine Rees, and some extra tenors, including Maldwyn Phillips. Whitehead added basses John Williams and a ‘rough-looking’ singer from the Rhondda called Harry Price whose big bass voice and ‘working class’ looks made him ideal for drinking and tavern scenes and other light-hearted scenarios. Altogether, the adult chorus was sixteen strong, consisting of eight male and eight female voices.

Bunford had the additional role of training the children's chorus and helping Norman Whitehead choose and arrange music from the range of Welsh songs, hymns and traditional tunes that were to provide the show's main content.

== Supporting cast ==
For many of the set-piece scenes, Ivor Emmanuel was accompanied by a quartet of male singers drawn from the adult chorus. Most often these were tenor Denis Griffiths, baritone Bryn Williams, and basses John Williams and Harry Price. This line-up grew into a favourite grouping that producer Chris Mercer was happy to repeat over and over again.

Regular solo spots were also given to Sian Hopkins, a member of the Canton contingent in the Children's Chorus. Aged about 13 or 14 in 1958, and with a clear sweet soprano voice, Hopkins quickly became a favourite young soloist on Land of Song. She was also paired in duets with Denis Griffiths, who was himself an occasional soloist. Other featured Welsh singers included the soprano Marion Davies.

Although the orchestral musicians, dancers and choreographers who worked on the show, were full-time professionals brought in from London, the singers were all local, Welsh, semi-professional performers, most having other regular jobs. The show was, therefore, a big commitment for them. There were weekly rehearsals in the weeks when there was no broadcast and then, in the week leading up to the monthly broadcast, rehearsals were held on several weekday evenings, again all day on the Saturday for the dress rehearsal, and then again all day on the Sunday, culminating in the live broadcast that same evening.

== On air ==
Land of Song was broadcast monthly, initially for forty minutes, at 6.15pm on a Sunday evenings. Later it was extended to an hour. It opened with its signature tune, the traditional Welsh folk-melody Llwyn Onn (‘The Ash Grove’). Each show had a loose theme: for example, the countryside or the seaside. A sequence of musical scenes then unfolded, requiring a whole range of costume changes. There were farmyard scenes, hunting scenes, seaside scenes, barber shop scenes, tavern scenes, scenes on board a ship and so on. The singers dressed up as fishermen, clowns, sailors, farm labourers or whatever was required. Many of the farming scenes featured live animals – horses, sheep, cows, ducks, chickens, etc. Ivor Emmanuel led the big set-pieces, and in between were scenes for other soloists, duets or quintets. The music performed encompassed the full range of the rich musical tradition of Wales, from roistering choral numbers to gentle folk ballads, from humorous songs to stirring anthems. Each programme normally ended with a Welsh hymn tune.

== Popularity ==
Viewers’ reaction to Land of Song was enthusiastic from the very beginning. Its screening nationally, on every fourth Sunday throughout the year without a break, gave it a wide currency, and helped to build those audiences approaching ten million in its heyday.

The measure of the popularity of Land of Song and that of its lead singer, was underlined in 1960 by Ivor Emmanuel's appearance, along with members of the children's chorus, on the 31st Royal Variety Performance at London's Victoria Palace Theatre, the first to be televised (by ATV), being broadcast live, nationally, at 8pm on Sunday 22 May 1960. The star-studded cast which entertained HM Queen Elizabeth II and HRH Prince Philip and television viewers around the UK and abroad included Max Bygraves, Alma Cogan, Nat King Cole, Russ Conway, Billy Cotton and his Band, Sammy Davis Jr., Lonnie Donegan, Diana Dors, Charlie Drake, Jimmy Edwards, Adam Faith, Bruce Forsyth, Benny Hill, Frankie Howerd, Hattie Jacques, Teddy Johnson & Pearl Carr, Liberace, Vera Lynn, Millicent Martin, Bob Monkhouse, Cliff Richard, Anne Shelton, the Tiller Girls, Norman Wisdom, Harry Worth, and band-leader Jack Hylton. In the midst of that galaxy – something of a Who's Who of TV entertainment at the time – Ivor Emmanuel sang with a "Welsh Children’s Choir".

Also in 1960 the Land of Song cast was invited to make a record by pianist and record producer Isabella Wallich (1916–2001) who was then fast making a reputation for herself as an enthusiastic sponsor of Welsh music. The niece of recording pioneer Fred Gaisberg, then the force behind EMI and the Abbey Road studios, Wallich was Britain's first woman record producer, having launched her own independent record label, Delysé, in July 1954.

In her memoir, Recording My Life (2001), she writes of having become aware of the success of Land of Song and the show's star Ivor Emmanuel whom she recalls as "one of the most popular singers of the day". Wallich was particularly keen on the dimension provided by the children's choir, and she duly brought the Land of Song cast to London where recording sessions took place at the Conway Hall in Red Lion Square in Bloomsbury, a venue that Wallich and her recording engineer Allen Stagg had favoured for several earlier recordings.

Spurred by the popularity of the TV show, the Land of Song EP (Delysé EDP 209) sold well immediately on release. From the same recording session a second EP, also called Land of Song (Delysé EDP 210 – "volume two"), was issued in July 1960.

The original sleeve note of EDP 209 read: "Each month, early on a Sunday evening, millions of independent television viewers switch on to enjoy ‘LAND OF SONG’, a Welsh programme of music and song. On this record are some of the most popular numbers specially selected and arranged from the many shows presented." The numbers featured on the two EPs are as follows:-

EDP.209: Yr Hogen Goch Trad – Ivor & chorus; Clychau Aberdyfi (‘Bells of Aberdovey’) Trad – BBC Octet; Dafydd y Garreg Wen (‘David of the White Rock’) Trad. – Ivor solo; Codiad yr Hedydd (‘The Rising of the Lark’) Trad. – Chorus; Three Welsh Nursery Rhymes (Dacw Mam Yn Dwad – children's choir; Deryn y Bwn o’r Banna – children's choir; and Ble’r ei Di? – Sian Hopkins solo); Y Broga Bach (‘The Little Frog’) Trad. – Ivor & children's choir; Bws Bach i’r Dre (‘The Song of the Bus’) Gerallt Richards – Ivor & children's choir.

EDP.210: Can y Melinydd (‘The Miller’s Song’) Trad. – Ivor & chorus; Dodd y Law (‘Give me your Hand’) Trad. – Ivor solo; Hyfrydol Welsh hymn – Children's choir; Aberystwyth Welsh Hymn – Ivor & chorus; Dan yr Ymbarel (‘Under the Umbrella’) Gerallt Richards – Ivor & children's choir; Yr Ehedydd (‘The Skylark’) W. S. Gwynn Williams – Sian Hopkins; Pwsi Meri Mew (‘The Pussy Cat’) Trad. – Ivor & children's choir; Y Mae Afon (‘There is a River’) Daniel Protheroe – Children's choir.

One of the Land of Song EPs entered the popular music charts – then called the ‘Hit Parade’ – reaching a high-water mark in 1961 at number thirteen in the EP chart.

Aside from a single ten-minute sample opening sequence of VT footage that survives in the TWW archive, the Delysé recordings represent the most significant remnant of Land of Song.

== The end of Land of Song ==
And then, in 1960-1, Land of Song was beset by a row over pay. The local Welsh singers came to realize that their fees were very small compared to the fees being paid to the orchestral musicians and dancers brought in from London. TWW had not regarded the Welsh singers as full-time professional musicians and their rates were therefore much lower, despite the main burden of work falling so heavily upon them. The Musician's Union (MU) stepped in and, after negotiation, TWW agreed to offer the local singers professional rates. But this in turn put a heavier burden on the show's budget, and the producers seized the crisis as an opportunity to review and ‘refresh’ the show.

All the local Welsh singers were required to re-audition for their places in the show. Some were successful, others were not. The show's original star, Ivor Emmanuel, who had initially walked out in sympathy with his fellow Welsh singers, returned once the MU settlement had been reached. Emmanuel was no longer featured in every subsequent edition, however. He led the Welsh language editions, as before, but in between, for shows where there was now to be less emphasis on traditional Welsh material, other entertainers (e.g. Johnny Stewart, Johnny Tudor) were brought in to lead in his place.

So the show continued, but something fundamental had changed. More ‘songs from the shows’ were now introduced into the musical mix and more singers were brought in from the London stage to sing them. The essentially Welsh character became diluted as attempts were made to appeal more directly to the wider UK audience.

Other alterations were also made. Between 1958-62 the show was performed wholly live from the Pontcanna studios, but during the 1962-4 period some pre-recorded sequences began to be included. Sequences, for example, were recorded outdoors at a beach or at "Ivor’s farm", or at other rural and seaside locations near Cardiff. Perhaps in this way something of the spontaneity of the original was dissipated.

After the "bust up" of 1962, Land of Song continued for another year or eighteen months and finally came to an end in 1964.

Its impact was not forgotten however. On 3 March 1968, as the Wales and the West of England independent television franchise was about to pass, controversially, to Harlech Television (HTV), the final show broadcast by the outgoing TWW (All Good Things… i.e. come to an end) featured Bernard Braden, Morecambe and Wise, Clifford Evans, Anita Harris, Manfred Mann, Gwyn Thomas, Stan Stennett, Wyn Calvin, Stanley Unwin, the Pendyrus Male Voice Choir and – in homage to the nationwide success that Land of Song had brought to the company between 1958 and 1964 – Ivor Emmanuel.
