= David Thomas Jones (administrator) =

David Thomas Jones FRSE FRSS CBE (1866–1931) was a British administrator and author associated with the Scottish fishing industry.

== Life ==
He was born in Gilfach Goch in south Wales on 10 June 1866 the son of David Thomas Jones. He was educated at Long Ashton School. For most of his life he worked for the Fishery Board for Scotland, and wrote extensively on the fishing industry. He served as Secretary 1909 to 1920 and Chairman 1920 until his death in 1931.

In 1903 he married Alison Macmillan Beattie (d.1925). They lived at 12 Polwarth Grove in the west of Edinburgh.

In the First World War he acted as Paymaster to the Royal Navy Reserve. He was created a Commander of the Order of the British Empire (CBE) for his services in 1919. In 1924 he was elected a Fellow of the Royal Society of Edinburgh. His proposers were Sir D'Arcy Wentworth Thompson, James Hartley Ashworth, James Ritchie, and William Leadbetter Calderwood.

He died on 4 February 1931.

== Publications ==
- Whaling in the Shetlands
- Development in the Scottish Mackerel Fishing
- Development of Lobster Fishing in Scotland (1920)
- Rural Scotland during the War (1926)
- Scottish Fisheries during the War
