= California (1947 film) =

1947 film by John Farrow

- Theatrical release poster
- Directed by: John Farrow
- Screenplay by: Frank Butler; Theodore Strauss; Seton I. Miller (uncredited)
- Story by: Boris Ingster
- Produced by: Seton I. Miller; John Farrow
- Starring: Ray Milland; Barbara Stanwyck; Barry Fitzgerald
- Cinematography: Ray Rennahan
- Edited by: Eda Warren
- Music by: Score: Victor Young; Songs: Earl Robinson (music); Yip Harburg (lyrics)
- Production company: Paramount Pictures
- Distributed by: Paramount Pictures
- Release date: January 14, 1947
- Running time: 97 minutes
- Country: United States
- Language: English
- Box office: $3.9 million (US rentals)

California is a 1947 American Western film directed by John Farrow and featuring Ray Milland, Barbara Stanwyck (in her Technicolor debut), and Barry Fitzgerald. Stanwyck's singing voice was dubbed by Kay St. Germaine.

== Plot ==
Jonathan Trumbo, a deserter who had been an army lieutenant, is hired to guide a wagon train bound for California during the California Gold Rush. When a woman named Lily Bishop is accused of cheating at poker in a saloon, farmer Michael Fabian invites her to join the wagon train over Trumbo's strenuous objections. Trumbo also accuses her of cheating at cards after losing to Lily, an insult that she promises not to forget.

Lily leaves with Booth Pennock, a ruffian who injures Trumbo with a whip before departing. Lily ends up in Pharaoh City running a saloon. The town is controlled by Pharaoh Coffin, a former slave trader who opposes law and order and California statehood. After Trumbo becomes involved in a saloon brawl, Lily orders him to never return to the saloon, but Trumbo wins the place in a poker game.

Lily mistakenly takes Pharaoh to be an honest man and moves into his hacienda. Coffin's men assault Trumbo, who is rescued on the trail by Mexicans and vows revenge. When his wounds heal, Trumbo returns and becomes a spokesman for statehood advocacy. Coffin's hired men kill Fabian for similar beliefs, causing Lily to finally see Coffin for the crazed villain he is. Trumbo forms a posse and corners Coffin, who is descending into madness, and Lily shoots him. Trumbo, in love with Lily, promises to return to the army to atone for his desertion, hoping to someday return to her.

== Cast ==
- Barbara Stanwyck as Lily Bishop
- Ray Milland as Jonathan Trumbo
- Barry Fitzgerald as Michael Fabian
- George Coulouris as Pharaoh Coffin
- Albert Dekker as Pike
- Anthony Quinn as Hernandez
- Frank Faylen as Whitey
- Gavin Muir as Booth Pennock
- James Burke as Pokey
- Eduardo Ciannelli as Padre
- Roman Bohnen as Col. Stuart
- Argentina Brunetti as Elvira
- Howard Freeman as Senator Creel
- Julia Faye as Wagon Woman
- Ethan Laidlaw as Reb (uncredited)
- Ian Wolfe as James K. Polk (uncredited)
- Lester Dorr as Mike, the Dealer (uncredited)
