= Fishery Board for Scotland =

The Fishery Board for Scotland was a Scottish public body which existed between 1882 and 1939.

== Establishment ==
The Board was established by the Fishery Board (Scotland) Act 1882 (45 & 46 Vict. c.78). It replaced the Board of British White Herring Fishery from 16 October 1882. It was based in Edinburgh.

The 1882 Act provided for the Board to consist of the sheriffs of three sheriffdoms, who were appointed by Her Majesty and held office during their tenure of the office of sheriff, and six other members appointed by Her Majesty for a five year term with the possibility of reappointment. Her Majesty was empowered to appoint one member as Chairman and another as Deputy Chairman. The limitation on the term of office was removed by the Reorganisation of Offices (Scotland) Act 1928, which provided that His Majesty might appoint a person to hold office during pleasure. This provision was used to extend the chairmanship of DT Jones later that year.

The Board was reconstituted from 1 January 1896 by the Sea Fisheries Regulation (Scotland) Act 1895 (58 & 59 Vict. c.42) to consist of seven members, those being the Chairman, a sheriff of a county in Scotland, a person of skill in the branches of science concerned with the habits and food of fishes, and four others representative of the various sea fishing interests of Scotland.

The functions of the Board were transferred to the Secretary of State for Scotland by the Reorganisation of Offices (Scotland) Act 1939, and the Board ceased to exist.

== Functions ==
The Fishery Board took on all the functions of the Board of British White Herring Fishery under the Herring Fishery Acts and the Sea Fishery Acts 1868 and 1875. It "took cognizance" of "everything relating to the coast and deep sea fisheries of Scotland" and was to take such measures for their improvements as funds allowed. It also had general superintendence of the salmon fisheries of Scotland and had the powers and duties of Commissioners under the Salmon Fishery Acts, but without prejudice to the district salmon fishery boards. It was to comply with instructions from the Home Secretary, and make an annual report.

The Home Secretary was also empowered to appoint an inspector of salmon fisheries of Scotland, who (under direction of the Fishery Board) was to inspect all the salmon fisheries of Scotland and inquire into the operation of the Salmon Fishery Acts.

The 1882 Act and the remit of the Board and inspector of salmon fisheries did not extend to the River Tweed.

The Board's functions were extended by the Fishery Board (Scotland) Extension Act 1894 (57 & 58 Vict. c.14) to provide for the construction or improvement of harbours in Scotland.

The Sea Fisheries Regulation (Scotland) Act 1895 conferred additional functions on the Board in relation to prohibition of seine trawling, regulation of beam trawling and otter trawling, regulation of mussel and clam fisheries.

== Membership ==
Members included-

- 1887 Sir Thomas Jamieson Boyd, Kt. - Chairman
- 1887 James Cossar Ewart - member
- 1887 Sir James Ramsay-Gibson-Maitland, Bart. -member reappointment
- 1887-88, 1896-97 Robert William Cochran-Patrick, Esq., Deputy Chairman from 1896
- 1887 James Johnston, Esq.,
- 1887 William Boyd, Esq.
- 1888 William Anderson Smith in place of Cochran-Patrick, resigned
- 1892 Dugald McKechnie, Sheriff of Argyllshire in place of Alexander Forbes Irvine
- 1892 Peter Esslemont - member and Chairman
- 1892 James Ritchie Welch
- 1893 William Anderson Smith
- 1894 Angus Sutherland - member and Chairman
- 1896 Donald Crawford, sheriff of Aberdeen, Kincardine and Banff deputy Chairman from 1897
- 1896 John Murray
- 1896 William Robert Duguid, lately Provost of Buckie
- 1896 Archibald Jameson, fishmerchant, Edinburgh
- 1897 Lachlan Milloy
- 1898 D'Arcy Wentworth Thompson
- 1899 Daniel Mearns, ex-Lord Provost of Aberdeen
- 1903 Henry Watson
- 1911 Thomas Brash Morison Sheriff of Fife and Kinross
- 1911 Marquess of Breadalbane
- 1911 James Archibald
- 1911 John Hannel Irvin
- 1911 Malcolm Smith
- 1913 William Lyon Mackenzie, Sheriff of Ayrshire - member and Deputy Chairman
- 1920 David Thomas Jones - member and Chairman
- 1921 Duncan Maciver
- 1921 William Miller
- 1922 George Hall
- 1931 George Hogarth- member and Chairman
- 1931 William Watson Carstairs, Provost of Kilrenny, Anstruther Easter and Anstruther Wester
- 1931 William James Merson, Provost of Buckie
- 1931 George Slater
- 1936 John Robert Dickson, Sheriff of Argyll - Deputy Chairman
- 1936 George Campbell
- 1936 James Hay
- 1936 George Slater
- 1938 Daniel Patterson Blades - Deputy Chairman
