= Esme Lewis =

Welsh singer

- Born: Caerau, Maesteg, U.K.
- Other names: Esmé Lewis Morgan
- Occupation(s): Singer, composer, record producer, educator

Esme Lewis, sometimes written as Esmé Lewis, was a Welsh singer. She was a member of the BBC Welsh Singers, and was regularly seen on the television program Gwlad y Gân from 1958 to 1964.

== Early life and education ==
Lewis was born in Caerau, Maesteg. She was performing music from early childhood. She won a Glamorgan Vocal Scholarship to further her musical studies, and graduated from University College, Cardiff, with honours.

== Career ==
Lewis won her first prize for singing as a three-year-old, and was first heard on BBC at the age of 8. She won a gold medal at the National Eisteddfod, for a duet with Aldwyn Humphreys. She was a soprano singer, and played guitar, harp and lute, while performing traditional and popular songs in both Welsh and English. She performed at the Royal Albert Hall and the Royal Festival Hall. She was a frequent singer on the ITV program Gwlad y Gân from 1958 to 1964. In 1961, she presented an episode of Sprigyn o Rosmari, a BBC television series about Welsh folk music. In 1976, she appeared on The Folk Club, on BBC Wales. "I spend so much time entertaining other people that I hardly ever have time to get entertained myself," she told an interviewer in 1959.

Lewis toured with other British and Irish folk musicians in Australia and New Zealand in 1966. In the 1970s she was a senior lecturer at Cardiff College of Education, and toured in the United States as a soloist with a Welsh men's choir. She also composed songs and produced records.

== Recordings ==
- Welsh Folk Songs with Guitar (1952, with Grace G. Davies)
- Folk Songs in Welsh (1965)
- Twelve Days of Christmas (1965, with Patrick Shuldham-Shaw)
- Oats And Beans And Barley (1966, with Patrick Shuldham-Shaw and a children's choir)
- Alawon Gwerin Cymru (1966)
- Songs of Wales (1969, with the Band of the Welsh Guards)

== Personal life ==
Lewis married scholar Iwan James Morgan, who died in 1966. Her second husband was Dr. John Bradley Jones.
