= The San Francisco Docks =

1940 film

- Directed by: Arthur Lubin
- Written by: Stanley Rubin; Edmund Hartmann
- Produced by: Marshall Grant
- Starring: Burgess Meredith; Barry Fitzgerald; Irene Hervey
- Cinematography: Charles Van Enger
- Music by: Charles Previn
- Distributed by: Universal Pictures
- Release date: December 1940
- Running time: 60 minutes
- Country: United States
- Language: English

The San Francisco Docks is a 1940 American crime drama film directed by Arthur Lubin and starring Burgess Meredith, Barry Fitzgerald, and Irene Hervey.

== Plot ==
When his sweetheart, barmaid Kitty Tracy, is annoyed by a customer, longshoreman Johnny Barnes slugs the guy. The man is later found dead. Johnny is tried for murder and convicted.

Kitty and a priest, Father Cameron, believe in Johnny's innocence and search for a way to exonerate him. They discover that Monte March, a prisoner who has escaped Alcatraz prison, is the real killer, being helped by wife Frances in fleeing from the law. March is apprehended and Johnny's set free.

The movie is noteworthy in that featured a fight scene between two of the actresses, Esther Ralston and Irene Hervey. Both women told director Arthur Lubin that they did not want to have stunt doubles perform the fight scene, described by press accounts as a "... whirlwind fistfight... said to overshadow the most hectic feminine movie battles seen in recent motion pictures." Hervey later described the fight as a "...terrific battle between me and Esther Ralston—with hair-pulling, kicking, the works."

== Cast ==
- Burgess Meredith as Johnny Barnes
- Irene Hervey as Kitty Tracy
- Barry Fitzgerald as Icky
- Robert Armstrong as Father Cameron
- Raymond Walburn as Admiral Andy
- Esther Ralston as Frances
- Edward Pawley as Monte March

== Production ==
In May 1940 Universal announced the film as part of its schedule for the following year. On September 20 the studio said Meredith would star alongside Irene Harvey and Barry Fitzgerald, with Arthur Lubin to direct. The film was shot in eleven days.

== Reception ==
The New York Times called it "routine... a lot of melodramatic foolishness."
