= The Flame of Hercules =

1955 novel by Richard Llewellyn

The Flame of Hercules: The Story of a Fugitive Galley Slave
- First edition (US)
- Author: Richard Llewellyn
- Language: English
- Genre: Historical fiction
- Published: 1955
- Publisher: Michael Joseph (UK); Doubleday (US)
- Publication place: United Kingdom
- Pages: 255

The Flame of Hercules: The Story of a Fugitive Galley Slave is a 1955 novel by Richard Llewellyn. It tells the story of a young captive prince from Gaul, Garvan, and how his travails augur that of young Christianity. He falls in love with the daughter of a prominent citizen of Herculaneum, a Vestal. They become a part of a conflict between the devotees of Christ and of Diana.
