= Gary M Dobbs =

British writer and actor (born 1965)

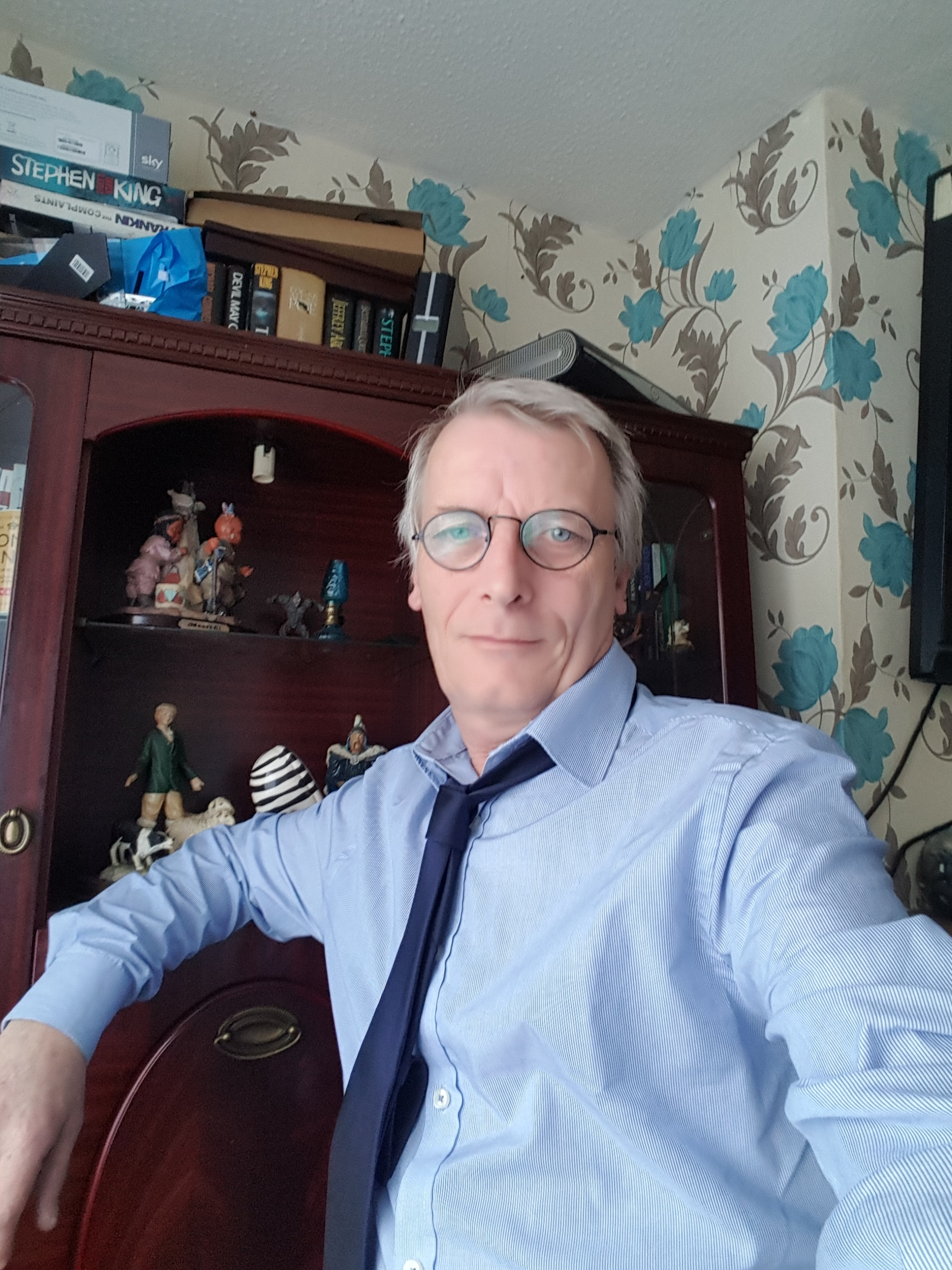
- Born: Gary Martin Dobbs; 1965 (age 60–61); Rhondda Cynon Taff, Wales, United Kingdom
- Occupations: Novelist, short story writer, Actor
- Writing career
- Pen name: Jack Martin
- Period: 2009–present
- Genres: Western, Crime fiction, Mystery
- Notable works: Granny Smith and the Deadly Frogs

Gary Martin Dobbs (born 1965, known by the pen name Jack Martin) is a British writer and actor. He is known for a string of Western novels for Robert Hale's Black Horse Western imprint, including Arkansas Smith, The Ballad of Delta Rose, and The Afterlife of Slim McCord. In 2016 a digital edition of Tarnished Star was issued by Piccadilly Publishing under the alternative title of LawMaster. The title change refers to the title used for the script by Neil Jones and Gary Dobbs which is optioned for a feature film.

Dobbs is the writer of the series of mysteries featuring the character of Granny Smith. As an actor Dobbs has appeared (often uncredited) in many British TV shows, as well as in the films The Reverend and Risen. In 2014 Dobbs wrote the 2013 non-fiction historical book, Cardiff and the Valleys in the Great War, published by Pen and Sword Books. Other non-fiction works include Dark Valleys (2016), Cardiff at War 1939–1945 (2018) and A Date with the Hangman: A history of capital punishment.

== Early life ==
Gary Martin Dobbs was born in 1965 in South Wales to Horace Dobbs and Violet (Martin) Dobbs. His early life was spent in the one-time coal-mining village of Gilfach Goch. His adolescence was, in his own words, idyllic with his love of reading and eventually writing instilled in him by his mother who, after discovering he was a poor reader, sat him down and taught him to read. In an interview with BBC Radio Wales, Dobbs stated, "I was eleven years old at the time. And it was the best thing anyone ever did for me. As soon as I conquered the act of reading the written word a whole new world opened for me."

== Career ==
Dobbs wrote his first novel at fifteen years of age, which went unpublished, but it was an experience he never forgot and has been writing ever since. Dobbs has claimed that being born into a working class area, and educated at the local comprehensive school, he was denied encouragement by the education system and owes his love of literature to his mother and grandfather, Jack Martin. It was his grandfather's name that Dobbs used as a pen-name for his string of best-selling western novels published first by Robert Hale Ltd and then by Crowood Press.

== Bibliography ==
=== Fiction ===
- A Policeman's Lot
- Granny Smith and the Deadly Frogs
- Granny Smith Investigates
- Granny Smith: The Welsh Connection (short story)
- A Man called Masters (Novella) (as Jack Martin)
- Arkansas Smith (as Jack Martin)
- The Ballad of Delta Rose (as Jack Martin)
- The Afterlife of Slim McCord (as Jack Martin)
- The Tarnished Star (as Jack Martin)
- Wild Bill Williams (as Jack Martin)
- Granny Smith: The Welsh Connection (2013)
- Riding the vengeance Trail (as Jack Martin) (2015)
- Massacre at Red Rock (as Jack Martin) 2016
- Red Sky at Night (Commando Comics) 2020
- The Red Beret (Commando Comics) 2021

=== Non fiction ===
- Dark Valleys ( Pen and Sword Books) 2016 Non Fiction
- Cardiff and the Valleys in The Great War (Pen and Sword Books) 2014 Non Fiction
- Cardiff and the Valleys at War 1939 - 1945 (Pen and Sword Books) 2018 Non Fiction
- A Date with the Hangman (Pen and Sword Books) 2019 Non Fiction
- A Dark History of whisky (Pen and Sword Books) 2025 Non Fiction
- The Myth and Magic of Elvis Presley: How the King Became Immortal (FORTHCOMING) (White Owl Books) 2027 non fiction

== Filmography ==
Year	Title	Role	Director	Notes	
	Doctor Who	Prisoner		TV series	
2010	Risen	Pub Cleaner	Neil Jones		
2011	The Reverend	Gimp	Neil Jones		
2014	Taxi Tales	Talkative Cabbie	Craig Tantrwm		Interactive AP
