= George Prowse =

Recipient of the Victoria Cross

George Henry Prowse
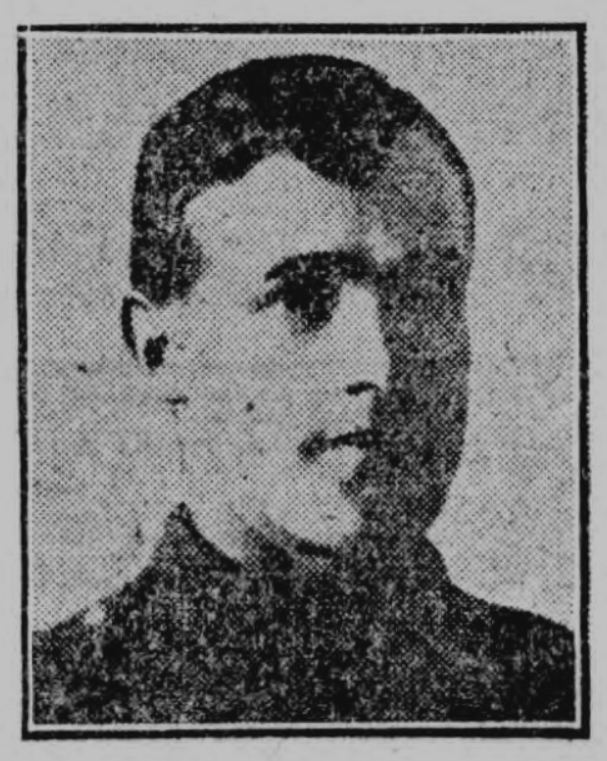
- Born: 29 August 1886; Brynsion Terrace, Gilfach Goch
- Died: 27 September 1918 (aged 32); Anneux, France
- Military career
- Allegiance: United Kingdom
- Branch: Royal Navy
- Service years: 1915–1918
- Rank: Chief Petty Officer
- Units: Drake Battalion
- Conflicts: World War I
- Awards: Victoria Cross; Distinguished Conduct Medal

Chief Petty Officer George Henry Prowse VC, DCM (29 August 1886 – 27 September 1918) was a British recipient of the Victoria Cross, the highest and most prestigious award for gallantry in the face of the enemy that can be awarded to British and Commonwealth forces. He served with the Royal Naval Division during the Gallipoli Campaign and in France on the Western Front where he was killed in action before the award of either of his decorations was announced.

== Naval service ==
According to his service record, which has been placed online by The National Archives, Prowse was born on 28 August 1896, however the Commonwealth War Graves Commission gives his age at death as 32, which would place his birth in 1886. Recent research in South Wales has unearthed a birth certificate that shows he was actually born on 29 August 1886 in Brynsion Terrace, Gilfach Goch, Llantrisant and a Blue plaque was placed on the house (Brynsion Terrace has since been renamed to be part of High Street) by the local council, Rhondda Cynon Taff on 21 October 2006. He enlisted in the Royal Navy Volunteer Reserve for the Royal Naval Division, on 26 February 1915. The details recorded in his service record show he was living in the Landore area of Swansea, Wales with his wife Sarah; he had been working as a collier, was 6 feet (1.8 m) tall, had grey eyes, brown hair and a "fair" complexion. At some time he relocated to Camerton, Somerset, probably to work in the coal mines there. In the churchyard at Camerton there is a war memorial with his name shown.

Prowse was initially rated Ordinary Seaman, on 5 May 1915 he was promoted to Able Seaman (rank). After completing training at Blandford, in September 1915 he was posted to the Drake Battalion, which was then engaged in the Gallipoli campaign. It is not clear how much active service Prowse saw at this time as he spent significant periods hospitalised with first jaundice and then gastroenteritis, finally rejoining his battalion in Egypt on 9 January 1916. The division remained engaged in the Gallipoli campaign until May 1916 when it was transferred to France. Prowse arrived at Marseille on 7 June 1916, on 20 June he was promoted Petty Officer.

In November 1916 the Division was employed in the Battle of the Ancre, the final attempt to resolve the Battle of the Somme. Prowse received a gunshot wound in his left thigh on 13 November (the opening day of the battle) and after initial treatment in France was admitted to a hospital in Epsom on 17 November. Having been discharged from hospital, he went back to the base at Blandford on 9 January 1917, and eventually returned to his battalion in France on 28 March 1917.

In August 1918 Prowse was recommended for the award of the DCM. The citation, published posthumously in 1919 stated

On 21st August, 1918, at Logeast Wood, he led his men with great gallantry against a machine gun that was holding up the advance of the flank of his company, and in spite of difficulties of heavy mist he captured it, disposing of the crew. On a subsequent occasion he held a position against repeated counter at tacks which were supported by an intense bombardment for twenty-four hours. His courage, leadership, and cheerful disposition had an invaluable effect on his men.

Prowse was about 32 years old, and a Chief Petty Officer in the Royal Naval Volunteer Reserve, (Drake Battalion, Royal Naval Division) during the First World War when the following deed took place for which he was awarded the VC.

On 2 September 1918 at Pronville, France, Chief Petty Officer Prowse led a small party of men against an enemy strong-point, capturing it, together with 23 prisoners and 5 machine-guns. On three other occasions he displayed great heroism in dealing with difficult and dangerous situations, and at one time he dashed forward and attacked and captured two machine-gun posts, killing six of the enemy and taking 13 prisoners and two machine-guns. He was the only survivor of this gallant party, but his action enabled the battalion to push forward in comparative safety.

=== Citation ===
For most conspicuous bravery and devotion to duty when, during an advance, a portion of his company became disorganised by heavy machine gun fire from an enemy strong point. Collecting what men were available he led them with great coolness and bravery against this strong point, capturing it together with twenty-three prisoners and five machine guns. Later, he took a patrol forward in face of much enemy opposition, and established it on important high ground. On another occasion he displayed great heroism by attacking single-handed an ammunition limber which was trying to recover ammunition, killing three men who accompanied it and capturing the limber. Two days later he rendered valuable services when covering the advance of his company with a Lewis gun section, and located later on two machine gun positions in a concrete emplacement, which were holding up the advance of the battalion on the right. With complete disregard of personal danger he rushed forward with a small party and attacked and captured these posts, killing six enemy and taking thirteen prisoners and two machine guns. He was the only survivor of the gallant party, but by this daring and heroic action he enabled the battalion on the right to push forward without further machine gun fire from the village. Throughout the whole operations his magnificent example and leadership were an inspiration to all, and his courage was superb.

He was killed in action, Anneux, France, on 27 September 1918.

== Medal award ==
Sarah Prowse was presented with her husband's Victoria Cross by H.M. King George V at Buckingham Palace on 17 July 1919, after all the live recipients. She led the list of posthumous awards and was presented with the last VC with the blue naval ribbon.

Prowse's Victoria Cross is in the Lord Ashcroft VC Collection at the Imperial War Museum.
