= The Sainted Sisters =

1948 film by William D. Russell

- 1948 Theatrical Poster
- Directed by: William D. Russell
- Written by: Harry Clork; N. Richard Nash
- Based on: Adaptation by Mindred Lord, story The Sainted Sisters of Sandy Creek by Elisa Bialk, and play adaptation by Bialk and Alden Nash
- Produced by: Richard Maibaum
- Starring: Veronica Lake; Joan Caulfield; Barry Fitzgerald; George Reeves
- Cinematography: Lionel Lindon
- Edited by: Everett Douglas
- Music by: Van Cleave
- Distributed by: Paramount Pictures
- Release date: April 30, 1948 (U.S.)
- Running time: 89 minutes
- Country: United States
- Language: English

The Sainted Sisters is a 1948 American comedy film starring Veronica Lake and co-starring Joan Caulfield, Barry Fitzgerald, George Reeves, William Demarest and Beulah Bondi. The film was distributed by Paramount Pictures and is notable for being the last film Veronica Lake made under her contract with the studio.

== Plot ==
After escaping New York City with the loot from a successful scam they pulled, sisters Letty and Jane Stanton decide to hide out in a small town in Maine close to the Canada–US border. Robbie McCleary takes them in, only to discover the large surplus of money mysteriously appearing.

The girls reluctantly get involved in a charity program and unwittingly become the local celebrities of the town, something that causes a problem when their fame attracts attention outside the small town and the people affected by their previous scams begin to catch up with them.

== Cast ==
- Veronica Lake as Letty Stanton
- Joan Caulfield as Jane Stanton
- Barry Fitzgerald as Robbie McCleary
- George Reeves as Sam Stoaks
- William Demarest as Vern Tewilliger
- Beulah Bondi as Hester Rivercomb
- Chill Wills as Will Twitchll
- Kathryn Card as Martha Tewilliger
- Darryl Hickman as Jud Tewilliger
- Jimmy Hunt as David Frisbee
- Clancy Cooper as Cal Frisbee
- Dorothy Adams as Widow Davitt
- Hank Worden as Taub Beasley
- Ray Walker as Abel Rivercomb

== Production ==
Elisa Bialk wrote a short story, The Sainted Sisters of Sandy Creek. It was adapted into a play by Bialk and Alden Nash, which was to be produced by the Theatre Guild in 1944 as a possible vehicle for Tallulah Bankhead. However the play was never produced.

Film rights were bought by Paramount in July 1946. They originally announced Betty Hutton would star from a Mindred Lord script, co-starring Diana Lynn (sister), John Lund (minister) and Sterling Hayden (cop), with Val Lewton to produce and Mitchell Leisen to direct in early 1947.

However Hutton and Leisen wound up instead working on Dream Girl and the project was postponed. It was re-activated later in 1947 with Hutton still down as star; George Marshall was to direct and Richard Maibaum was to produce from an N. Richard Nash and Mary McCall script. William Demarest, Sterling Hayden, Barry Fitzgerald and Joan Caulfield were to support Hutton.

Hutton dropped out to go on maternity leave and was replaced by Veronica Lake; George Marshall was replaced as director by William Russell. Sterling Hayden refused to play his role and was put on suspension. His role was taken by George Reeves. Filming started in October 1947.

This was the last film Veronica Lake made under her contract with Paramount. She had previously been one of their top stars throughout the early 1940s.

== Reception ==
Diabolique said "maybe this would’ve worked if Betty Hutton had been able to play the lead, as originally intended. Instead Paramount went with Lake who is disastrously miscast, lacking sparkle and verve in a part that needs, well, Hutton – or even Diana Lynn. Joan Caulfield has some game as her sister but is mostly just pretty. Mind you, neither have much of a character to play."
