= Gilfach Goch =

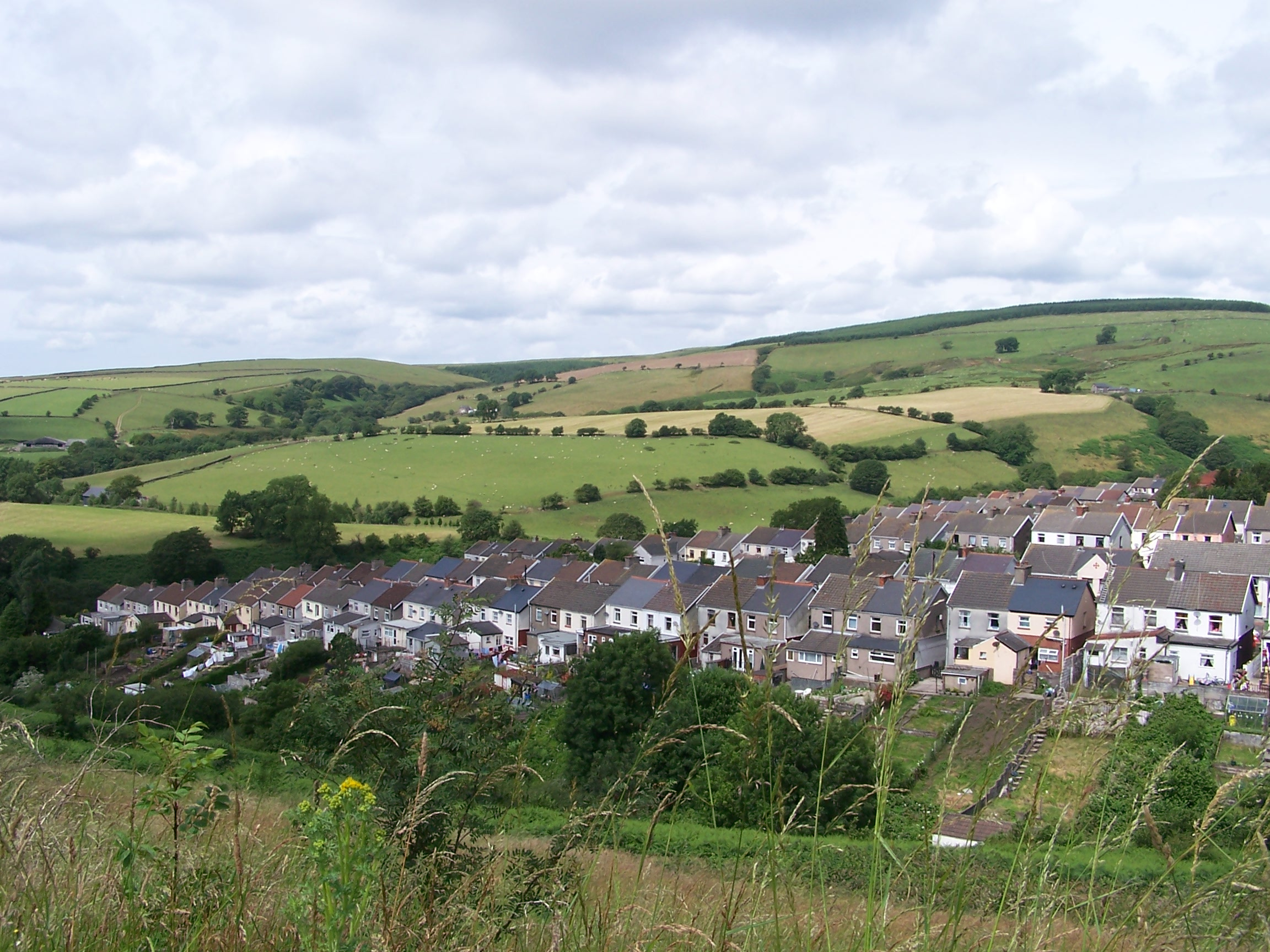
- Population: 3,337 (2021)
- Principal area: Rhondda Cynon Taf
- Preserved county: Mid Glamorgan
- Country: Wales
- Sovereign state: United Kingdom
- Post town: Porth
- Postcode district: CF39
- Police: South Wales
- Fire: South Wales
- Ambulance: Welsh
- UK Parliament: Rhondda and Ogmore
- List of places UK Wales Rhondda Cynon Taf 51.592°N 3.473°W Map of the community

Gilfach Goch is a community, electoral ward and small former coal mining village mostly in Rhondda Cynon Taf, south Wales, near the larger community of Tonyrefail. Some areas in the North Western part of the village lie within Bridgend County Borough. It is situated in the Cwm Ogwr Fach (Small Ogmore Valley) between the Cwm Ogwr Fawr (Large Ogmore Valley) to the west and the Cwm Rhondda (Rhondda Valley) to the east.

== Etymology ==
The translation of Gilfach Goch into English is easily understood (cil = nook or secluded area, bach = small) but several theories have been put forward as to where the name came from, especially the term coch = red. Writing in 1887, Thomas Morgan, put forward the idea that the name was derived from "...a heap of red cinders, which still remains as a memento of the ironworks that stood there in times of yore".

In 1903 local historian Owen Morgan theorised that the area was the location of an ancient site of importance to the local druids. During the Roman Conquest of Britain, Roman cavalry attacked the 'defenceless of Dinas', but were routed when thousands heeded the call of the Druids. Morgan concludes that coch refers to the blood shed by the defeated Roman soldiers.

These theories have been queried more recently, as it has been shown that the area known as Gilfach Goch and, in particular, the site where the red cinders of the ironworks are found, was not originally named as such. Prior to 1860, Gilfach Goch was an area of mountain land situated in the Ogwr Fach valley in the parish of Ystradyfodwg far north of present-day Gilfach. Ordnance survey maps have shown that the name Gilfach Goch is not only the name of the community that sprang up with the coming of coal, but the hill and a strip of land on the east bank of the Ogwr Fach. This section of the Ogwr Fach valley is very narrow and lends itself to the description cil-fach, but is also home to a tributary of the River Ogwr whose bed contains iron ore. The ore reddens the appearance of the stream, which could be the origin of the name.

== History ==
Gilfach Goch developed as a coal mining village during the industrialisation of the south Wales valleys in the 19th century. Three pits were sunk in the area, the Britannic, the Dinas Main and the Trane and Llewellyn. Evan Evans, a self-made businessman, acquired the mineral rights to large parts of land of Gilfach Goch in the early 1860s. His first mine, the first in Gilfach Goch, was the Dinas Main Colliery. It reached the Rhondda No.3 seam in 1868 and was known for its high quality coal and coke. The Dinas Main Colliery Company sank two shafts into the steam coal measure between 1894 and 1896, and this pit became known as the Britannic Merthyr Colliery. In 1907 an explosion occurred at the Dinas Main Colliery. Seven men were killed, while others escaped through an old horse-way tunnel. The Dinas Main was closed after the accident, the Trane pit closed in 1953 and the Britannic closed in 1960.

The scattered development of the village's collieries caused a similar scattered approach to the housing; the logic of their placement is now lost, since the mines have all closed. At the south end of the village there are a series of parallel cul-de-sac properties lined with cottage pairs, instead of the terraces synonymous to the region. This unusual layout was promoted by the Cardiff-based Welsh Garden Cities Ltd as their first Garden Village and was built between 1910 and 1914.

In the 2001 census, of all rural areas with a population over 1,500, Gilfach Goch had the largest percentage of people in the whole of England and Wales who stated that they had no religion.

== Buildings ==
The oldest building in the village is the Griffin Inn, a public house which is situated in low marshy ground at the end of a country lane.

The most notable religious building is the church of St Barnabas which began construction in 1896 and was completed in 1899. A nave with a lower chancel was added in 1933. During the Second World War the church was hit by a Luftwaffe bomb; it was reconstructed in the 1950s.

== Governance ==
The Gilfach Goch electoral ward is coterminous with the borders of the Gilfach Goch community and elects a county councillor to Rhondda Cynon Taf County Borough Council.

Gilfach Goch Community Council represents the community at the local level, with seven community councillors.

== Residents of note ==
- Bryn Allen (1921—2005) — Wales international footballer, born in Gilfach Goch
- Gary Dobbs (born 1965) — British writer and actor
- William Griffiths (1898—1962) — violinist and founder of Griffs Bookshop in Cecil Court, London, blue plaque at the Griffiths family home
- David Thomas Jones CBE, FRSE (1866—1931) — administrator and author on the fishing industry
- Richard Llewellyn (1906—1983) — British novelist, resided while writing How Green Was My Valley set in a fictional village based on Gilfach Goch
- George Henry Prowse VC, DCM (29 August 1896—27 September 1918) — Recipient of the Victoria Cross

== Bibliography ==
- Davies, Meirion (1981). Glynogwr and Gilfach Goch: A History. Mid Glamorgan: D. Brown & Sons Ltd. ISBN 0905928148.
