= Poison Pen (play) =

1937 play

- Original language: English
- Written by: Richard Llewellyn
- Genre: Mystery

Premiere
- Date: 9 August 1937
- Place: Richmond Theatre, London

Poison Pen is a mystery play by the British writer Richard Llewellyn. In a small English village, a series of poison pen letters cause chaos and suspicion.

It premiered at Richmond Theatre before transferring to the West End where it ran for 176 performances between 9 April and 19 September 1938, initially at the Shaftesbury Theatre before moving to the Playhouse Theatre and then the Garrick Theatre. The original West End cast included Roddy Hughes, Walter Fitzgerald, Neville Brook, Jack Allen, Ethel Warwick, Dorothy Black and Margaret Yarde.

== Film adaptation ==
In 1939 it was made into a film of the same title directed by Paul L. Stein and starring Flora Robson, Ann Todd and Robert Newton.

== Bibliography ==
- Goble, Alan. The Complete Index to Literary Sources in Film. Walter de Gruyter, 1999.
- Wearing, J.P. The London Stage 1930-1939: A Calendar of Productions, Performers, and Personnel. Rowman & Littlefield, 2014.
