= None but the Lonely Heart (film) =

1944 film by Clifford Odets

None But the Lonely Heart
- Theatrical release poster
- Directed by: Clifford Odets
- Written by: Clifford Odets
- Based on: None but the Lonely Heart; 1943 novel by Richard Llewellyn
- Produced by: David Hempstead
- Starring: Cary Grant; Ethel Barrymore; Barry Fitzgerald; June Duprez; Jane Wyatt; George Coulouris; Dan Duryea
- Cinematography: George Barnes
- Edited by: Roland Gross
- Music by: Hanns Eisler
- Distributed by: RKO Radio Pictures
- Release date: October 17, 1944
- Running time: 113 minutes
- Country: United States
- Language: English
- Budget: $1.3 million

None but the Lonely Heart is a 1944 American drama romance film which tells the story of a young Cockney drifter who returns home with no ambitions but finds that his family needs him. Adapted by Clifford Odets from the 1943 novel of the same title by Richard Llewellyn and directed by Odets, the film stars Cary Grant, Ethel Barrymore, and Barry Fitzgerald.

The title of the film is taken from Tchaikovsky's song "None but the Lonely Heart", which is featured in the background music.

== Plot ==
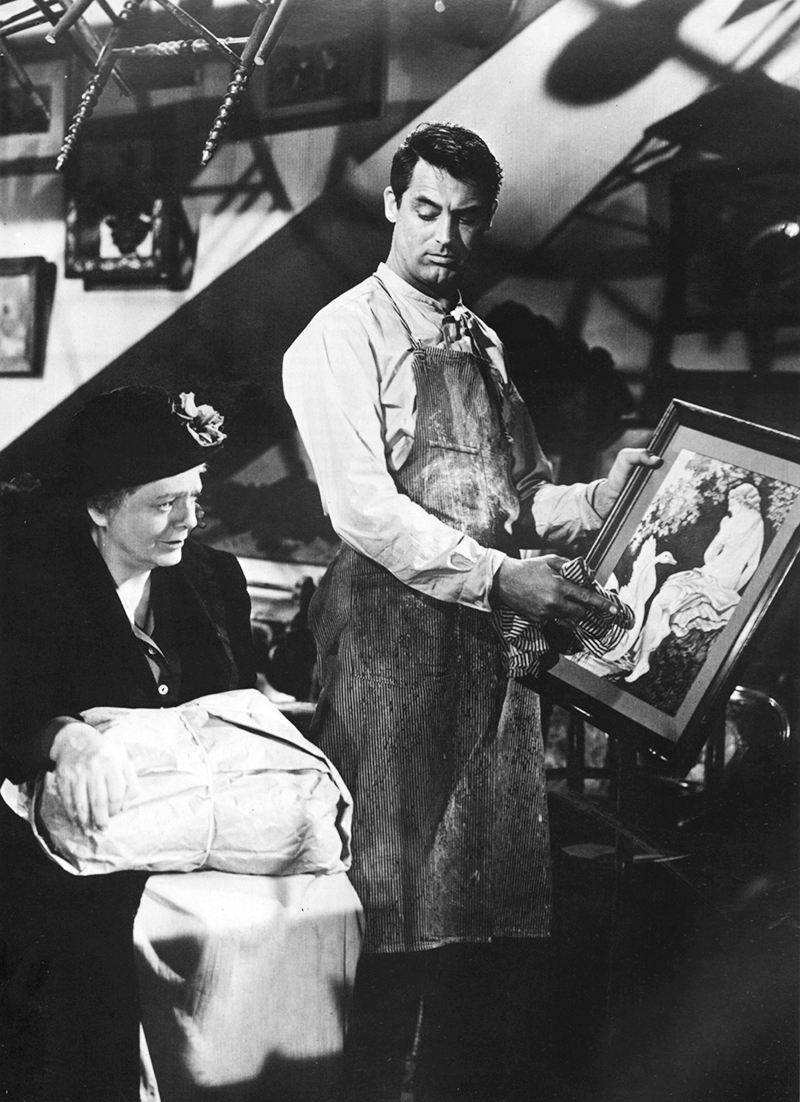
Ethel Barrymore and Cary Grant in the film

Ernie Mott is a restless, independent, wandering Cockney with perfect pitch. On Armistice Day, Ernie visits the tomb of the Unknown Warrior in Westminster Abbey, which memorializes those who died in World War I, including his father. Ernie seeks a life where he is neither 'the hound nor the hare,' neither a victim or a thug. When he returns home, his mother Ma asks why he has returned after so long and gives him an ultimatum that he must stay home now or leave forever. He informs her that he will then be leaving next morning and goes out to get a drink. He meets fellow musician Aggie Hunter outside the bar, but instead prefers the company of a gangster's fickle former wife, Ada Brantline. However, when Ernie becomes smitten with Ada, she rejects his offer of a date when he tells her he will be leaving town the next day.

The next morning, Ma tells her pawnbroker friend, Ike Weber, that she has cancer. Ma and Ernie get into another fight, but after he storms out, Ike shares with him that his mother needs him in her battle with cancer. Ernie returns and says that he will stay with her at home and help her run her shop.

A month passes, and Ernie continues to pursue Ada. However, when gangster Jim Mordinoy informs him that she is still his wife, Ernie does not believe Ada when she says that is a lie and he cuts her off socially. Ernie begins to notice the poverty surrounding him in London and chooses to accept Mordinoy's offer to join his activities, even against Ada's pleas. Ernie begins to steal cars, and he is involved in a police chase until his car collides with a truck and explodes into flames. Ada implores him to run away with her, but he does not want to leave his dying mother.

When Ernie is eventually bailed out of jail by Ike, he finds out that after the police discovered Ernie's platinum cigarette case — his birthday gift from Ma — was stolen, the police arrested Ma and put her in prison. She begs for forgiveness for shaming the family and dies in prison hospital. When he returns home, he learns via a letter from Ada that she decided to stay with Mordinoy because that would make her life easier. Ernie is crushed and walks along the street until he gets to Aggie's door and walks in.

== Cast ==
- Cary Grant as Ernie Mott
- Ethel Barrymore as Ma Mott
- Barry Fitzgerald as Henry Twite
- June Duprez as Ada Brantline
- Jane Wyatt as Aggie Hunter
- George Coulouris as Jim Mordinoy
- Dan Duryea as Lew Tate
- Roman Bohnen as Dad Pettyjohn
- Konstantin Shayne as Ike Weber
- Marie De Becker as Madame La Vaka (uncredited)

== Production ==
None but the Lonely Heart, Gunga Din (1939) and Sylvia Scarlett (1935) were the only films in which Cary Grant used a Cockney accent, though that was not his original accent. He was originally from Bristol.

RKO Pictures head Charles Koerner bought Richard Llewellyn's book as a starring vehicle for Cary Grant. Koerner also suggested that playwright Clifford Odets direct the picture. This was the first feature film Odets directed, and he would direct only one other picture during his career, The Story on Page One (1959). To secure Ethel Barrymore's availability to complete her scenes, RKO had to pay all the expenses incurred by temporarily closing the play The Corn Is Green, in which she was starring on Broadway.

According to The Hollywood Reporter, the East End London road set in this film was the largest and most complete external set constructed inside a sound stage at that time. The set measured 800 feet long and extended the length of two sound stages.

== Reception ==
Lela Rogers, the mother of Ginger Rogers, denounced the script of None but the Lonely Heart at a House Committee on Un-American Activities hearing as a "perfect example of the propaganda that Communists like to inject" and accused Odets of being a Communist. Rogers cited the line spoken by Ernie to his mother, "you're not going to get me to work here and squeeze pennies out of little people who are poorer than I am," as an example of Communist propaganda. Hanns Eisler, who was nominated for an Academy Award for composing the film's score, was also interrogated by the House Committee on Un-American Activities and was designated as an unfriendly witness for his refusal to cooperate.

In The Nation in 1944, critic James Agee wrote, "None But the Lonely Heart ... is an unusually sincere, almost-good film ... I suppose I should be equally impressed by the fact that the picture all but comes right out and says that it is a bad world which can permit poor people to be poor; but I was impressed rather because Odets was more interested in filling his people with life and grace than in explaining them, arguing over them, or using them as boxing-gloves." British critic Leslie Halliwell was surprised, "Wildly astonishing moodpiece to come from Hollywood during World War II; its picture of East End low life is as rocky as its star performance ... " Pauline Kael reported, "It was an extraordinary début film: Odets brought off some hard-earned effects with an élan that recalled Orson Welles' first movies. He also gave the material the rich melancholy of his best plays. Too much of it, however: the dirge-like, mournful fogged up atmosphere seemed fake and stagey, and the film failed at box offices. It made a pervasive, long-lasting impression, though. And as Ernie's mother ... Ethel Barrymore had perhaps her greatest screen role. In a few scenes, she and Grant touched off emotions in each other which neither of them ever showed on screen again. But he's not as vivid in the memory as she is."

=== Box office ===
The film recorded a loss of $72,000.

=== Accolades ===
Award	Category	Nominee(s)	Result	Ref.
Academy Awards	Best Actor	Cary Grant	Nominated	
Academy Awards	Best Supporting Actress	Ethel Barrymore	Won	
Academy Awards	Best Film Editing	Roland Gross	Nominated	
Academy Awards	Best Scoring of a Dramatic or Comedy Picture	Hanns Eisler and Constantin Bakaleinikoff	Nominated	
National Board of Review Awards	Best Film		Won	
National Board of Review Awards	Top Ten Films		Won	
National Board of Review Awards	Best Acting	Ethel Barrymore	Won	
National Board of Review Awards	Best Acting	June Duprez	Won	
