= Green, Green My Valley Now =

1975 novel by Richard Llewellyn

- First edition (publ. Michael Joseph)
- Author: Richard Llewellyn
- Publication date: 1975
- Pages: 236
- ISBN: 978-0-385-03374-9
- OCLC: 1217415

Green, Green My Valley Now is a 1975 novel by Richard Llewellyn. It was first published by Michael Joseph in the United Kingdom and Doubleday in the United States. It is the final of three sequels to the better known How Green Was My Valley.

== Plot summary ==
Huw Morgan has become a successful businessman in Patagonia, establishing farming and civil contracting enterprises. But with political currents shifting in military-governed Argentina, he and his second wife Sûs decide to return to Wales.

Now a rich man, Huw spares no expense to buy, restore and refurbish his wife's ancestral farmhouse in Mid-Wales and make it into a fine manor house. His apparently limitless wealth also allows him to buy property and land to try to restore the fortunes of the small local town. He becomes aware of nationalist feelings amongst the people, but makes no real attempt to understand them.

As news of his arrival spreads, he meets his niece Blodwen, his sister Olwen's daughter, a piano student; he sponsors her to study in Germany. He learns that the descendants of his other siblings live in Australia, United States, South Africa and New Zealand.

Huw is visited by a woman claiming to be the granddaughter of his brother Davy from Melbourne; she brings Kiri, a French girl, with her. She is later revealed to be a fraud, and an IRA terrorist, seeking an isolated country hideout for bomb-making. Kiri is a Breton nationalist and also a bomb-maker.

After his wife dies, Huw marries Teleri, also a descendant of the Patagonian Welsh. The ceremony at the farm is disrupted by a would-be assassin, seeking revenge for Kiri's imprisonment, but the attack is foiled by his many friends.

After the marriage, Huw and Teleri slip quietly away on honeymoon, planning to visit Patagonia. Before doing so, Huw finally visits his native valley, which he previously avoided, and is astonished to discover the coal tips gone and the area landscaped. Even fish have returned to the once-polluted river.
