= Barry Fitzgerald =

Irish actor (1888–1961)

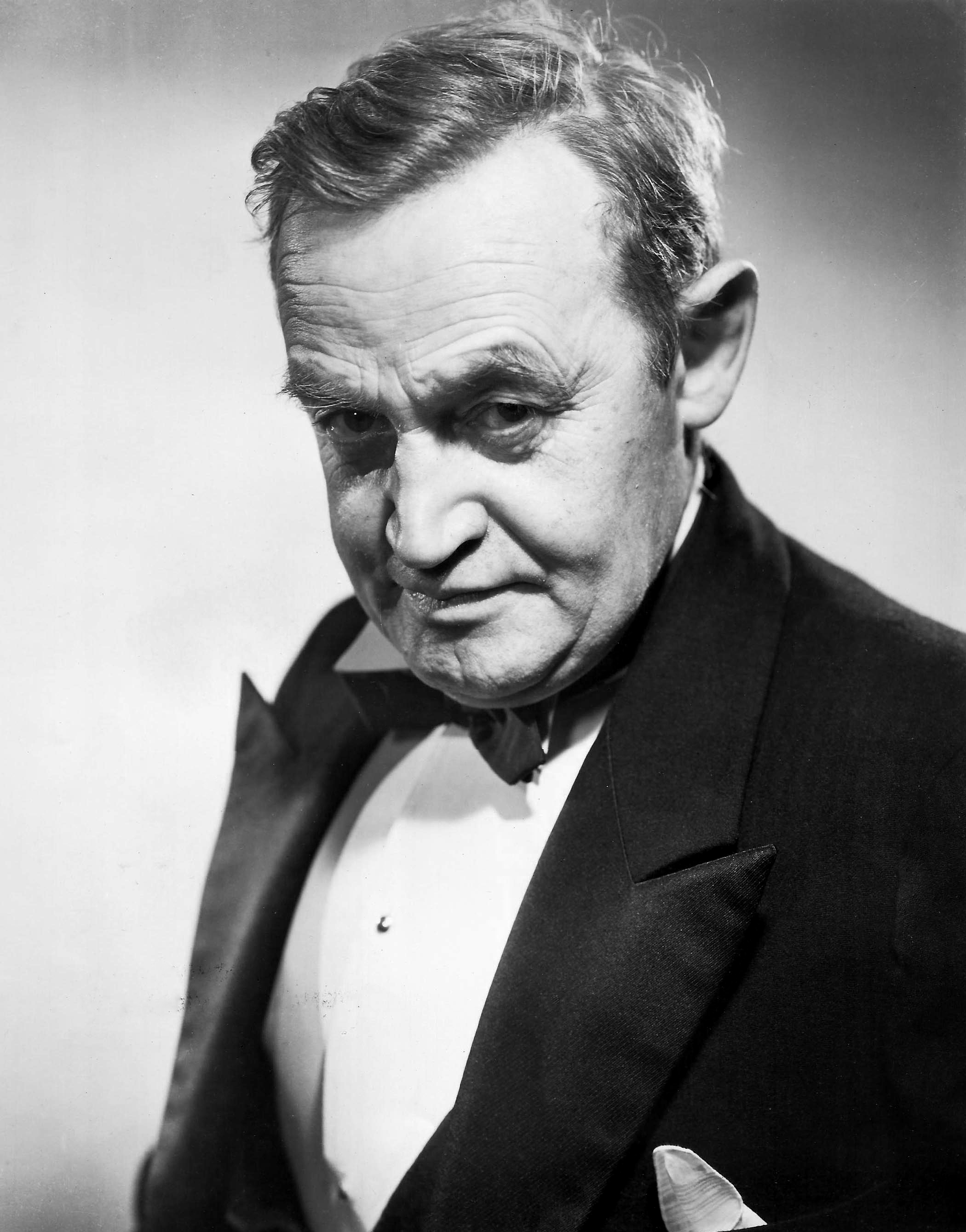
- Fitzgerald in 1945
- Born: William Joseph Shields; 10 March 1888; Portobello, Dublin, Ireland
- Died: 4 January 1961 (aged 72); Dublin, Ireland
- Occupation: Actor
- Years active: 1924–1961
- Relatives: Arthur Shields (brother)

William Joseph Shields (10 March 1888 – 4 January 1961), known professionally as Barry Fitzgerald, was an Irish stage, film, and television actor. In a career spanning almost forty years, he appeared in such notable films as Bringing Up Baby (1938), The Long Voyage Home (1940), How Green Was My Valley (1941), The Sea Wolf (1941), Going My Way (1944), None but the Lonely Heart (1944), and The Quiet Man (1952). For Going My Way, he won the Academy Award for Best Supporting Actor and was simultaneously nominated for the Academy Award for Best Actor for the same performance. In 2020, he was listed at number 11 on The Irish Times list of Ireland's greatest film actors.

== Early life ==
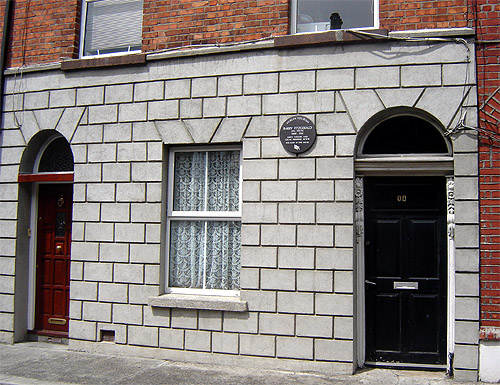
Fitzgerald's birthplace on Walworth Road, Portobello, Dublin

Fitzgerald was born William Joseph Shields on 10 March 1888 at Walworth Road, Portobello, Dublin, Ireland, to Fanny Sophia (née Ungerland) and Adolphus Shields. His father was Irish and his mother was German. He was the elder brother of the Irish actor Arthur Shields. Although he was often cast in roles associated with stereotypical Irish Catholic characters, Fitzgerald himself was raised in the Church of Ireland.

He attended Skerry's College in Dublin before joining the civil service, beginning as a junior clerk at the Dublin Board of Trade in 1911. He later worked in the unemployment office, which he described as "an easy job, full of leisure".

== Career ==
=== Abbey Theatre ===
Interested in acting, he began appearing in amateur dramatic societies such as the Kincora Players. He joined his brother Arthur Shields in the Abbey in 1915. He chose the stage name Barry Fitzgerald so as not to get in trouble with his superiors in the civil service.

Fitzgerald's early appearances at the Abbey included bit parts in plays such as The Casting Out of Martin Whelan and a four-word part in The Critic.

His breakthrough performance at the Abbey came in 1919, when he was in The Dragon by Lady Gregory. However, he continued to act part-time until 1929, keeping his job in the civil service during the day. He was in The Bribe, An Imaginary Conversation, John Bull's Other Island and others.

In 1924, Fitzgerald's salary at the Abbey was £2/10 a week. That year he appeared in the world premiere of Juno and the Paycock by famed playwright Seán O'Casey. Fitzgerald played Captain Jack Boyle.

He received much acclaim for his performance in Paul Twyning during 1925. The following year he was in the premiere of O'Casey's The Plough and the Stars, playing Fluther Good. The play was controversial, causing riots and protests. One night in February 1926, three gunmen turned up to Fitzgerald's mother's house intending to kidnap him and prevent the play from being performed, but they were unable to find him.

In 1926, Fitzgerald was in The Would-Be Gentleman. Other appearances at the Abbey included The Far Off Hills, Shadow of a Gunman, and The Playboy.

O'Casey wrote a part especially for Fitzgerald in the play The Silver Tassie, but it was rejected by the Abbey. The play was picked up for production in London in 1929. Fitzgerald decided to leave his civil service job to join the production and at age 41, he became a full-time actor.

=== Professional actor ===
Fitzgerald made his film debut in Alfred Hitchcock's version of Juno and the Paycock (1930), shot in London.

In early 1931, Fitzgerald toured England in a production of Paul Twyning. He returned to Ireland in June of that year to perform the play at the Abbey. Between 1931 and 1936, he appeared in three plays by Irish playwright Teresa Deevy—A Disciple, In Search of Valour, and Katie Roche—which were also Abbey Theatre productions.

In 1932, Fitzgerald travelled to the United States with the Abbey Players to appear in Things That Are Caesar's and The Far-off Hills.

Fitzgerald and the Players returned to the US in 1934 to tour a series of plays in repertory around the country. These included The Plough and the Stars, Drama at Inish, The Far-off Hills, Look at the Heffernans, The Playboy of the Western World, The Shadow of the Glen, Church Street, The Well of the Saints, and Juno and the Paycock.

Fitzgerald appeared in a short Irish silent film, Guests of the Nation, released only in Ireland in 1935. The film was not seen or distributed outside of Ireland until 2011.

=== Hollywood ===
In March 1936, Fitzgerald and three other members of the Abbey arrived in Hollywood to star in the film version of The Plough and the Stars (1936), directed by John Ford. Fitzgerald decided to remain in Hollywood where he soon found constant employment as a character actor. He had support roles in Ebb Tide (1937) at Paramount, Bringing Up Baby (1938) at RKO, Four Men and a Prayer (1938) directed by John Ford for 20th Century-Fox, and The Dawn Patrol (1938) at Warner Bros.

Fitzgerald made a series of films at RKO: Pacific Liner (1939) with Victor McLaglen, and two directed by John Farrow: The Saint Strikes Back (1939) and Full Confession (1939). In between the two Farrow films, Fitzgerald returned to Broadway in 1939 in The White Steed.

After Full Confession Fitzgerald went back to Broadway with Kindred (1939–40) and a revival of Juno and the Paycock (1940) which went for 105 performances.

Back in Hollywood, Fitzgerald was reunited with John Ford in The Long Voyage Home (1940). He appeared in San Francisco Docks (1940) at Universal and The Sea Wolf (1941) at Warner Bros., before making another film with Ford, How Green Was My Valley (1941), for Fox. He went to Metro-Goldwyn-Mayer for Tarzan's Secret Treasure (1941).

Fitzgerald and Shields starred in Tanyard Street (1941) on Broadway, directed by Shields, which had only a short run. However, Fitzgerald's personal notices were excellent, The New York Times calling him "the incarnation of the comic spirit. People start laughing the moment he pokes his squint face on set."

Back in Hollywood, Fitzgerald appeared in a series of films for Universal: The Amazing Mrs. Holliday (1943), Two Tickets to London (1943), and Corvette K-225 (1943).

=== Going My Way and stardom ===
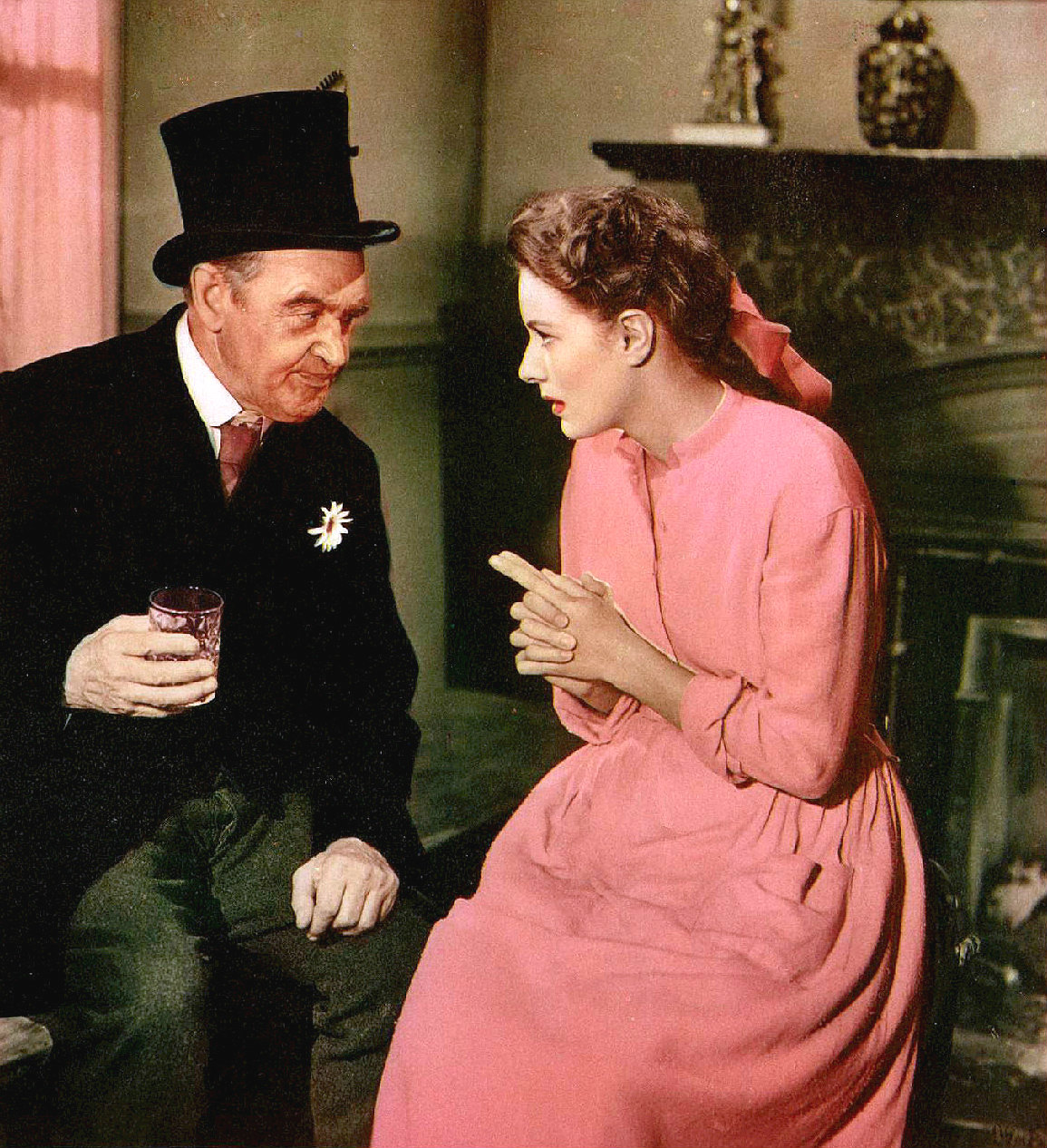
Fitzgerald and Maureen O'Hara in The Quiet Man (1952)

Fitzgerald unexpectedly became a leading man when Leo McCarey cast him opposite Bing Crosby in Going My Way, released by Paramount in 1944. The film was a huge success and Fitzgerald's performance as Father Fitzgibbon was nominated for both the Academy Award for Best Supporting Actor (which he ultimately won) and the Academy Award for Best Actor; voting rules were changed shortly after this occurrence to prevent dual nominations for the same role. During World War II, Oscar statuettes were made of plaster instead of gold-plated bronze to accommodate wartime metal shortages; an avid golfer, Fitzgerald later accidentally decapitated his Oscar while practicing his golf swing. The Academy provided Fitzgerald with a replacement statuette.

After Going My Way, Paramount signed Fitzgerald to a long-term contract. The studio cast him in a supporting role in I Love a Soldier (1944) and he was borrowed by RKO for None But the Lonely Heart (1944).

In March 1944, Fitzgerald was involved in a car accident which resulted in the death of a woman and the injury of her daughter. He was charged with manslaughter but was acquitted in January 1945 due to lack of evidence.

Back at Paramount, Fitzgerald supported Alan Ladd in Two Years Before the Mast, made in 1944 by John Farrow, but not released until 1946. He supported Betty Hutton in Incendiary Blonde (1945) and The Stork Club (1945). In between he had a cameo as himself in Duffy's Tavern (1945) and was borrowed by United Artists to play the lead in And Then There Were None (1945), based on the novel and play by Agatha Christie. In January 1945 his fee was reported to be $75,000 a film.

Fitzgerald made two more films with John Farrow: California (1947) with Ray Milland and Easy Come, Easy Go (1947), where he was top billed.

Paramount reunited Fitzgerald with Bing Crosby in Welcome Stranger (1947) and appeared in another cameo as himself in Variety Girl (1947).

Mark Hellinger borrowed Fitzgerald to play the lead in a cop film at Universal, The Naked City (1948), which was a solid success. Back at Paramount, he was in The Sainted Sisters (1948) and Miss Tatlock's Millions (1948), then appeared in a third film with Crosby, Top o' the Morning (1949).

Fitzgerald went to Warner Bros. for The Story of Seabiscuit (1949) with Shirley Temple, then to Paramount for Union Station (1950) with William Holden and Silver City (1951) with Yvonne de Carlo. He made his television debut with an episode of The Ford Theatre Hour, "The White-Headed Boy" in 1950.

=== Later career ===
Fitzgerald went to Italy to star in the comedy Ha da venì... don Calogero (1952). John Ford gave him third billing in the classic The Quiet Man (1952) which was shot in Ireland. He then appeared in Happy Ever After (1954) with De Carlo and David Niven.

Fitzgerald appeared in TV on episodes of Lux Video Theatre, General Electric Theater, and Alfred Hitchcock Presents.

He had a supporting role in MGM's The Catered Affair (1956) and was top billed in the British comedy Rooney (1958).

Fitzgerald was top billed in the Irish film Broth of a Boy (1959).

=== Later years and death ===
Fitzgerald never married. In Hollywood, he shared an apartment with his stand-in, Angus Duncan "Gus" Taillon, an Iroquois man who died in 1953. Fitzgerald returned to Dublin in 1959, where he lived at 2 Seafield Ave, Monkstown. In October that year, he underwent brain surgery. He appeared to recover, but in late 1960 he was re-admitted to hospital. He died of a heart attack at St Patrick's Hospital, James Street, on 4 January 1961, aged 72.

Fitzgerald has two stars on the Hollywood Walk of Fame: one for motion pictures at 6252 Hollywood Boulevard, and one for television at 7001 Hollywood Boulevard.

== Filmography ==
| Year | Title | Role | Notes |
|---|---|---|---|
| 1924 | Land of Her Fathers | | |
| 1930 | Juno and the Paycock | The Orator | |
| 1935 | Guests of the Nation | Captured British soldier | |
| 1936 | The Plough and the Stars | Fluther Good | |
| 1937 | Ebb Tide | Huish | |
| 1938 | Bringing Up Baby | Mr. Gogarty | |
| 1938 | Four Men and a Prayer | Trooper Mulcahay | |
| 1938 | Marie Antoinette | Peddler | Uncredited |
| 1938 | The Dawn Patrol | Bott | |
| 1939 | Pacific Liner | Britches | |
| 1939 | The Saint Strikes Back | Zipper Dyson | |
| 1939 | Full Confession | Michael O'Keefe | |
| 1940 | The Long Voyage Home | Cocky | With John Wayne. |
| 1940 | The San Francisco Docks | The Icky | |
| 1941 | The Sea Wolf | Cooky | With Edward G. Robinson, John Garfield, and Ida Lupino |
| 1941 | How Green Was My Valley | Cyfartha | |
| 1941 | Tarzan's Secret Treasure | O'Doul | With Johnny Weissmuller. |
| 1943 | The Amazing Mrs. Holliday | Timothy Blake | |
| 1943 | Two Tickets to London | Captain McCardle | |
| 1943 | Corvette K-225 | Stooky O'Meara | |
| 1944 | Going My Way | Father Fitzgibbon | Academy Award for Best Supporting Actor; Golden Globe Award for Best Supporting Actor – Motion Picture; New York Film Critics Circle Award for Best Actor; Nominated–Academy Award for Best Actor |
| 1944 | I Love a Soldier | Murphy | |
| 1944 | None but the Lonely Heart | Henry Twite | |
| 1945 | Incendiary Blonde | Michael 'Mike' Guinan | |
| 1945 | Duffy's Tavern | Bing Crosby's Father | |
| 1945 | And Then There Were None | Judge Francis J. Quinncannon | |
| 1945 | The Stork Club | Jerry B. 'J.B.'/'Pop' Bates | |
| 1946 | Two Years Before the Mast | Terrence O'Feenaghty | |
| 1947 | California | Michael Fabian | |
| 1947 | Easy Come, Easy Go | Martin L. Donovan | |
| 1947 | Welcome Stranger | Dr. Joseph McRory | |
| 1947 | Variety Girl | Himself | |
| 1948 | The Naked City | Detective Lt. Dan Muldoon | |
| 1948 | The Sainted Sisters | Robbie McCleary | |
| 1948 | Miss Tatlock's Millions | Denno Noonan | |
| 1949 | Top o' the Morning | Sergeant Briany McNaughton | |
| 1949 | The Story of Seabiscuit | Shawn O'Hara | |
| 1950 | Union Station | Inspector Donnelly | |
| 1951 | Silver City | R.R. Jarboe | |
| 1952 | Ha da venì... don Calogero! | Don Calogero | |
| 1952 | The Quiet Man | Michaleen Oge Flynn | With John Wayne. |
| 1952 | Lux Video Theatre | Barry Flynn | episode: "The Man Who Struck It Rich" |
| 1954 | Tonight's the Night | Thady O'Heggarty | |
| 1955 | Alfred Hitchcock Presents | Harold 'Stretch' Sears | Season 1 Episode 12: "Santa Claus and the Tenth Avenue Kid" |
| 1956 | The Catered Affair | Uncle Jack Conlon | |
| 1958 | Rooney | Grandfather | |
| 1959 | Broth of a Boy | Patrick Farrell | |

Source: "Barry Fitzgerald". IMDb.

== Radio appearances ==
| Year | Program | Episode/source |
|---|---|---|
| 1952 | Lux Radio Theatre | Top o' the Morning |

== See also ==
- List of Academy Award winners and nominees from Ireland
- List of actors with Academy Award nominations
- List of people on the postage stamps of Ireland

== References and sources ==
- Boylan, Henry (1999). A Dictionary of Irish Biography (Third ed.). Dublin: Gill and Macmillan. p. 130. ISBN 978-0-7171-2945-4.
