= How Green Was My Valley (novel) =

1939 novel by Richard Llewellyn

- First edition cover
- Author: Richard Llewellyn
- Language: English
- Genre: Historical fiction
- Publisher: Michael Joseph
- Publication date: 1939
- Publication place: United Kingdom
- Media type: Print (hardcover)
- Pages: 651
- OCLC: 299207
- Followed by: Up, into the Singing Mountain (1960)

How Green Was My Valley is a 1939 novel by Richard Llewellyn, narrated by Huw Morgan, the main character, about his Welsh family and the mining community in which they live. The author had claimed that he based the book on his own experiences, but this was found after his death to be doubtful; Llewellyn was English-born and spent little time in Wales, though he was of Welsh descent. Llewellyn gathered material for the novel from conversations with local mining families in the village of Gilfach Goch, in southeast Wales.

In the United States, Llewellyn won the National Book Award for favourite novel of 1940, voted by members of the American Booksellers Association.

== Plot summary ==
The novel is set in South Wales during the reigns of Queen Victoria and King Edward VII. It tells the story of the Morgans, a respectable mining family of the South Wales Valleys, through the eyes of the youngest son, Huw Morgan.

Huw's academic ability sets him apart from his elder brothers and enables him to consider a future away from the dangerous coal mines. He loses his opportunity because of fighting with a schoolmaster who punishes children for speaking Welsh. His five brothers and his father are miners. After his eldest brother, Ivor, is killed in a mining accident, Huw moves in with Ivor's young widow, Bronwen, with whom he has always secretly been in love.

One of Huw's three sisters, Angharad, marries Iestyn Evans, the wealthy mine owner's son – whom she does not love – and the marriage is an unhappy one. She never overcomes her romantic relationship with Merddyn Gruffydd, a local minister, who had declined to marry her because of his poverty.

Huw's father is later killed in a mine disaster. After everyone Huw has known either dies or moves away, and the village is reduced to a contaminated shell while the house is being destroyed by a slag heap, he too decides to leave, and tells the story of his life just before going away.

== Characters ==
The Older Morgans:

- Gwilym Morgan, Huw's father: wants things done properly, with attention to manners, and a minding of one's own business
- Beth Morgan, Huw's mother: devoted to her children and husband, uneducated, struggles with her temper
- Ivor Morgan, Huw's eldest brother, marries Bronwen, sides with the father against the strike, defends sister Angharad against Iestyn Evans' initial familiarity
- Bronwen Morgan, Huw's sister-in-law: a gentle, insightful woman to whom Huw goes when he is troubled or wants to learn information that the adults hold from him. She is the mother of young boys, Gareth and Taliesin

The Middle Brothers: These are Huw's young adult brothers. Ianto goes to London to find work early in the book, but returns unhappily; Owen and Gwilym do the same later.

- Ianto Morgan, Huw's second-oldest brother
- Davy Morgan, a leader in the miners' union, marries Ethelwyn Rowlands
- Owen Morgan, an inventor, often found in the shed behind the house working on an engine
- Gwilym Morgan (junior), married to Marged Evans after Owen breaks off with her

The Younger Morgans:

- Angharad Morgan, Huw's sister, marries Iestyn Evans
- Ceridwen Morgan, Huw's sister, marries Blethyn Llywarch
- Huw Morgan, the Narrator
- Olwen Morgan, Huw's youngest sister

Other characters:

- Merddyn Gruffydd, the preacher who is loved by Angharad, helps Huw recover from his illness, and is supportive of the Morgans
- Iestyn Evans, an arrogant dandy, son of the mine owner, who courts Angharad. According to Young Gwilym, "a purse-proud ninny"
- Master Elijah Jonas-Sessions, a harsh teacher who makes Huw's life miserable. He is pro-English, and ashamed of his Welsh heritage
- Ceinwen Phillips, a manipulative young girl in love with Huw
- Abishai Elias the Shop, enemy of the Morgan family
- Dai Bando, Huw's boxing teacher
- Cyfartha Lewis, Dai's close friend

== First printing ==
The first edition was published in 1939 by Michael Joseph Ltd, London. The first printing included a limited edition run of 200, numbered and signed by Richard Llewellyn. The original print run also included a glossary covering Welsh words and terms at the end of the book.

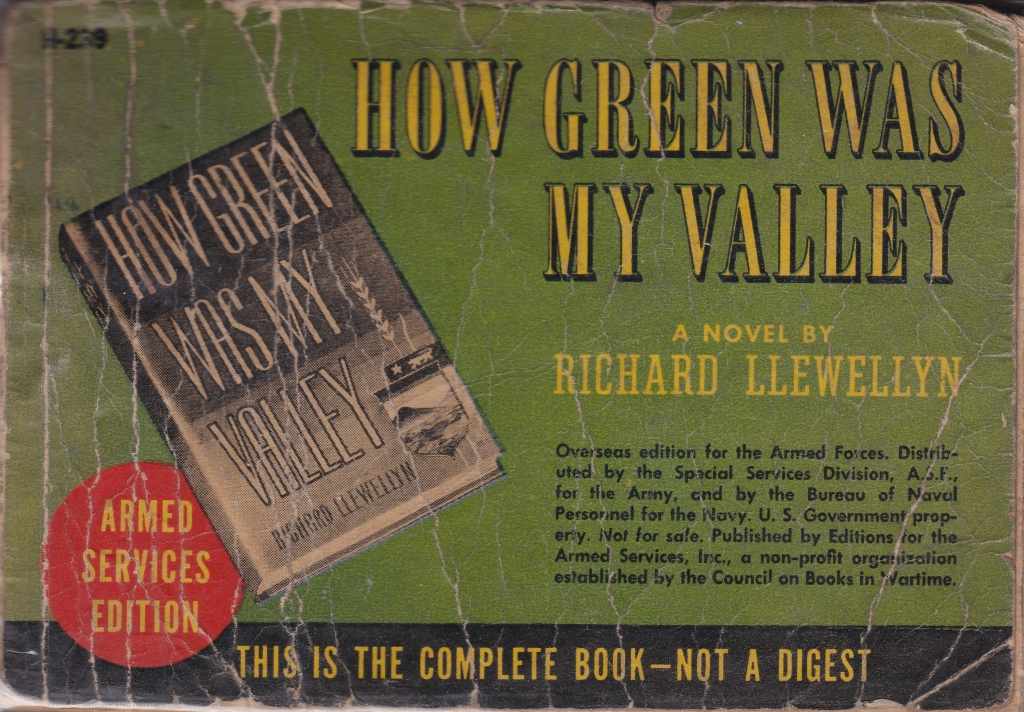
The armed services edition of How Green Was My Valley

== Sequels ==
The author continued the story of Huw Morgan's life in three sequels:

- Up, into the Singing Mountain (1960) – Huw emigrates to the Welsh colony in Patagonia, Argentina
- Down Where the Moon is Small (1966) – Huw's life in Argentina
- Green, Green My Valley Now (1975) – Huw returns to Wales

== Adaptations ==
The 1941 Hollywood film adaptation, which was highly successful, had a cast that included Walter Pidgeon, Maureen O'Hara, Anna Lee, Roddy McDowall (as Huw), Donald Crisp, and Barry Fitzgerald. None of the leading players were Welsh (though Welsh actor Rhys Williams made his screen debut in the film in a minor role). Directed by John Ford, How Green Was My Valley was selected for preservation in the United States National Film Registry. How Green Was My Valley is available on DVD from 20th Century Fox as part of their 20th Century Fox Studio Classics collection.

The book has twice been adapted by the BBC for television, in 1960 and 1975. The 1960 adaptation featured Eynon Evans, Rachel Thomas and Glyn Houston. The 1975 production, scripted by Elaine Morgan, starred Stanley Baker, (Dame) Siân Phillips, and Nerys Hughes.

The novel was adapted as a Broadway musical, called A Time for Singing, which opened at the Broadway Theatre, New York, on 21 May 1966. The music was by John Morris; book and lyrics were by Gerald Freedman and John Morris. The production was directed by Mr. Freedman, and it starred Ivor Emmanuel, Tessie O'Shea, Shani Wallis, and Laurence Naismith.

A stage version, adapted by Shaun McKenna was performed at the Theatre Royal in Northampton in 1990. It marked the stage debut of Aled Jones as the teenage Huw. It was directed by Michael Napier Brown and designed by Ray Lett.

In 2017, the book was also adapted as a short film, parts of which are shown in the music video for the song Pleader by the band alt-J.
