= Richard Llewellyn =

British novelist (1906–1983)

Richard Llewellyn

Richard Dafydd Vivian Llewellyn Lloyd (né Richard Herbert Vivian Lloyd; 8 December 1906, London – 30 November 1983, Dublin), known by his pen name Richard Llewellyn (/luˈɛlɪn/ loo-EL-in, Welsh: [ɬəˈwɛlɪn]), was an English novelist of Welsh descent, who is best remembered for his 1939 novel How Green Was My Valley, which chronicles life in a coal mining village in the South Wales Valleys.

== Biography ==
Richard Herbert Vivian Lloyd (he later used the name "Richard Dafydd Vivian Llewellyn Lloyd") was born in Hendon, Middlesex in 1906, the second child and only son of William Llewellyn Lloyd, a hotel clerk and later the assistant secretary to a club, and Sarah Anne, née Thomas. Only after his death was it discovered that Llewellyn's claim that he was born in St Davids, West Wales, was false.

In the U.S., Llewellyn won the National Book Award for favourite novel of 1940, voted by members of the American Booksellers Association.

He lived a peripatetic existence, travelling widely throughout his life. Before World War II, he spent periods working in hotels, wrote a play, worked as a coal miner and produced his best-known novel. During World War II, he rose to the rank of Captain in the Welsh Guards. His sister Gwladys (a Royal Red Cross commandant) and her two daughters were killed during the bombing of London, in June 1944. Following the war, he worked as a journalist, covering the Nuremberg Trials, and then as a screenwriter for MGM. During his lifetime, he lived in a variety of countries, including Italy, China, Brazil, Argentina, Kenya and Israel, in addition to Britain and Ireland.

Llewellyn married twice: his first wife was Nona Theresa Catherine Sonsteby, whom he married in 1952 and divorced in 1968; his second wife was editor Susan Frances Heimann (1940-2021), whom he married in 1974.

Richard Llewellyn died of a heart attack in The Meath Hospital, Dublin on 30 November 1983.

== Themes ==
Several of his novels dealt with a Welsh theme, the best-known being How Green Was My Valley (1939), which won international acclaim and was made into a classic Hollywood film. It immortalised the way of life of the South Wales Valleys coal mining communities, where Llewellyn spent a small amount of time with his grandfather. Three sequels followed.

== Bibliography ==
- Poison Pen: A Play in Three Acts (1938)
- How Green Was My Valley (1939)
- None but the Lonely Heart (1943)
- A Few Flowers for Shiner (1950)
- A Flame for Doubting Thomas (1954)
- Sweet Witch (1955)
- Mr. Hamish Gleave (1956)
- The Flame of Hercules (1957)
- Warden of the Smoke and Bells (1958)
- Chez Pavan (1959)
- Up, into the Singing Mountain (1960)
- A Man in a Mirror (1964)
- Sweet Morn of Judas' Day (1965)
- Down Where the Moon is Small (1966)
- Bride of Israel My Love (1973)
- Hill of Many Dreams (1974)
- Green, Green My Valley Now (1975)
- At Sunrise, the Rough Music (1976)
- Tell Me Now and Again (1977)
- A Night of Bright Stars (1979)
- I Stand on a Quiet Shore (1982)

Edmund Trothe series

- End of the Rug (1969)
- But We Didn't Get the Fox (1970)
- White Horse to Banbury Cross (1972)
- The Night is a Child (1974)
