= Julius Tannen =

American actor

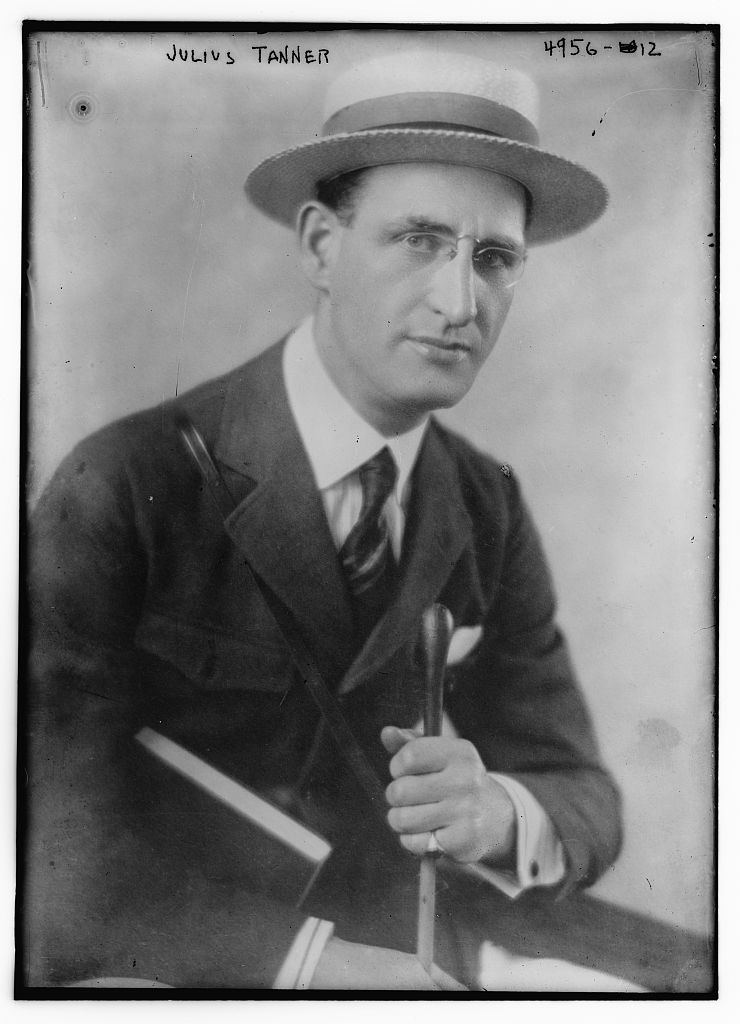
- Tannen in 1919
- Born: May 16, 1880; Manhattan, New York City, U.S.
- Died: January 3, 1965 (aged 84); Woodland Hills, California, U.S.
- Occupations: vaudevillian, comedian, actor
- Years active: 1901–1959
- Spouse: Beatrice Muhleman (m. 1899; died 1960)
- Children: 2

Julius Tannen (May 16, 1880 – January 3, 1965) was an American monologist in vaudeville. He was known to stage audiences for his witty improvisations and creative word games. He had a successful career as a character actor in films, appearing in over 50 films in his 25-year film career. He is probably best known to film audiences from the musical Singin' in the Rain, in which he appears as the man demonstrating a talking picture early in the film.

== Early years ==
After the deaths of his parents, Tannen was placed in an orphanage in Indianapolis, Indiana, when he was seven years old, and he lived there until he was 13. He worked as a private secretary until he was 21.

== Career ==
Tannen never intended to become a performer. As a young man, he was a salesman whose pitch was so good that he began to get offers to entertain at parties. He made his professional vaudeville debut at the age of 21, and soon developed into a monologist, the predecessor to today's stand up comic. He would frequently end his routines before the payoff of the story, allowing the audience to complete it for themselves, and exited with the phrase "My father thanks you, my mother thanks you, my sister thanks you, and I thank you," which was co-opted by the young George M. Cohan.

Tannen made his Broadway debut at the Aerial Gardens in 1905 in Jean Schwartz, William Jerome, and John J. McNally's musical Lifting the Lid. A spoof of early 20th century politics in New York City, Tannen portrayed the main character of district attorney William T. G. Rome which was a send up of Manhattan district attorney William Travers Jerome. He went on to appear in three other productions in the next year. As a vaudevillian, he played the Palace Theatre in New York City – the apex of vaudeville performing – more often than almost any one else, indicating that he was at the peak of his profession. He appeared again on Broadway in 1916, and returned again in 1920, in a comic play with music, Her Family Tree, for which he received credit for writing his own scenes. Tannen was also seen in two editions of Earl Carroll's Vanities, in 1925 and 1926, and in George White's Scandals. In 1926, he became manager of Vanities in addition to his comedic performances.

The advent of talking pictures created a need in Hollywood for performers with stage experience, and Tannen appeared in his first film in 1935, when he did an uncredited bit in Stranded. He signed a contract with 20th Century-Fox in 1935, working there for two years before becoming a freelance character actor. His screen career lasted through 1959, although he was frequently uncredited.

In 1938 Julius Tannen appeared in the Paramount feature Remember the Night, which was written by Preston Sturges. Sturges remembered him, and Tannen became part of the unofficial "stock company" of character actors, appearing in eight films written and directed by Sturges, with the size of his roles increasing over time. Tannen appeared in Christmas in July, The Lady Eve, Sullivan's Travels, The Palm Beach Story, The Miracle of Morgan's Creek, Hail the Conquering Hero, The Great Moment, The Sin of Harold Diddlebock, and Unfaithfully Yours.

Tannen's most memorable and prominent performance came at the age of 72, when he portrayed a man demonstrating the technology of talking pictures in Singin' in the Rain in 1952.

Tannen continued to appear in films until 1959, when he was seen in an uncredited role in director John Sturges' Last Train from Gun Hill.

== Personal life and death ==
When Tannen was 19 years old, he married Beatrice Muhleman. The couple, who had two sons, Charles and William, were married for 60 years, until her death in 1960. Tannen suffered a stroke in 1964 and died on January 3, 1965, at the Motion Picture Country Home in Woodland Hills, California, at the age of 84.

== Legacy ==
Lucille Ball said that seeing Tannen perform in her hometown of Jamestown, New York, when she was a child inspired her to go into show business.

His sons were both successful film and television actors; William Tannen was in the Metro-Goldwyn-Mayer stock company for more than a decade, appearing in dozens of films, and had a recurring role on The Life and Legend of Wyatt Earp; Charles Tannen later became a television executive.

== Partial filmography ==
- Stranded (1935) – Man at Train Terminal (uncredited)
- King of Burlesque (1936) – Auctioneer (uncredited)
- Collegiate (1936) – Detective Browning
- Half Angel (1936) – City Editor
- The Road to Glory (1936) – Lt. Tannen
- Sins of Man (1936) – Advertising Man (uncredited)
- 36 Hours to Kill (1936) – Dr. Borden
- Sing, Baby, Sing (1936) – Kansas City Radio Station Manager (uncredited)
- Dimples (1936) – Hawkins
- Pigskin Parade (1936) – Dr. Burke
- Reunion (1936) – Sam Fisher
- Stowaway (1936) – First Mate Jenkins
- One in a Million (1936) – Chapelle
- Love Is News (1937) – Logan
- Fair Warning (1937) – Mr. Taylor
- Mama Runs Wild (1937) – C. Preston Simms
- Love Is a Headache (1938) – Mr. Hillier
- Goodbye Broadway (1938) – Caldeway (uncredited)
- A Man to Remember (1938) – Hospital Administrator (uncredited)
- The Lady and the Mob (1939) -Train Conductor (uncredited)
- The Magnificent Fraud (1939) – American Businessman (uncredited)
- Danger Flight (1939) – Dawson
- Remember the Night (1940) – Jury Member (uncredited)
- The Lone Wolf Strikes (1940) – Hotel Manager (uncredited)
- The Mortal Storm (1940) – 3rd Colleague
- The Lady in Question (1940) – Judge of the Court (uncredited)
- Christmas in July (1940) – Mr. Zimmerman
- Bitter Sweet (1940) – Schlick's Companion (uncredited)
- No, No, Nanette (1940) – Disturbed Airline Passenger (uncredited)
- The Lady Eve (1941) – Lawyer (uncredited)
- Sullivan's Travels (1941) – Public Defender (uncredited)
- Confessions of Boston Blackie (1941) – Dr. Crane (uncredited)
- Harvard, Here I Come! (1941) – Prof. Anthony
- The Ghost of Frankenstein (1942) – Sektal (uncredited)
- Two Yanks in Trinidad (1942) – Doctor (uncredited)
- The Big Street (1942) – Judge Bamberger (uncredited)
- The Palm Beach Story (1942) – Proprietor of Store (uncredited)
- The Miracle of Morgan's Creek (1943) – Mr. Rafferty
- The Great Moment (1944) – Professor Charles T. Jackson
- The House of Frankenstein (1944) – Hertz
- Nob Hill (1945) – Minor Role (uncredited)
- The Dolly Sisters (1945) – Man (uncredited)
- A Scandal in Paris (1946) – Bank of Paris Manager (uncredited)
- The Sin of Harold Diddlebock (1947) – Nearsighted Banker
- Unfaithfully Yours (1948) – O'Brien
- Always Leave Them Laughing (1949) – Mr. H. Clurman (uncredited)
- Grounds for Marriage (1951) – Music Editor (uncredited)
- The People Against O'Hara (1951) – Toby Baum (uncredited)
- Singin' in the Rain (1952) – Man in Talking Pictures Demonstration (uncredited)
- Clash by Night (1952) – Waiter (uncredited)
- Carrie (1952) – John (uncredited)
- Loving You (1957) – Frank – Manager of Buckhorn Tavern (uncredited)
- I Married a Woman (1958) – Tim Smith – Sutton Advertising (uncredited)
- Once Upon a Horse... (1958) – Train Conductor (uncredited)
- The Last Hurrah (1958) – Mr. Kowalsky (uncredited)
- Last Train from Gun Hill (1959) – Horseshoe Cleaning Man (uncredited) (final film role)
