= Artef Theatre =

Artef Theatre may refer to:

- Artef Theatre, a name for theater company of the Arbeter Teater Farband (ATF) active from 1925 to 1940
- Artef Theatre, a name for the Broadway playhouse Edyth Totten Theatre used when it was the home of the ATF from 1934 to 1937
