= Georgia Caine =

American actress (1876–1964)

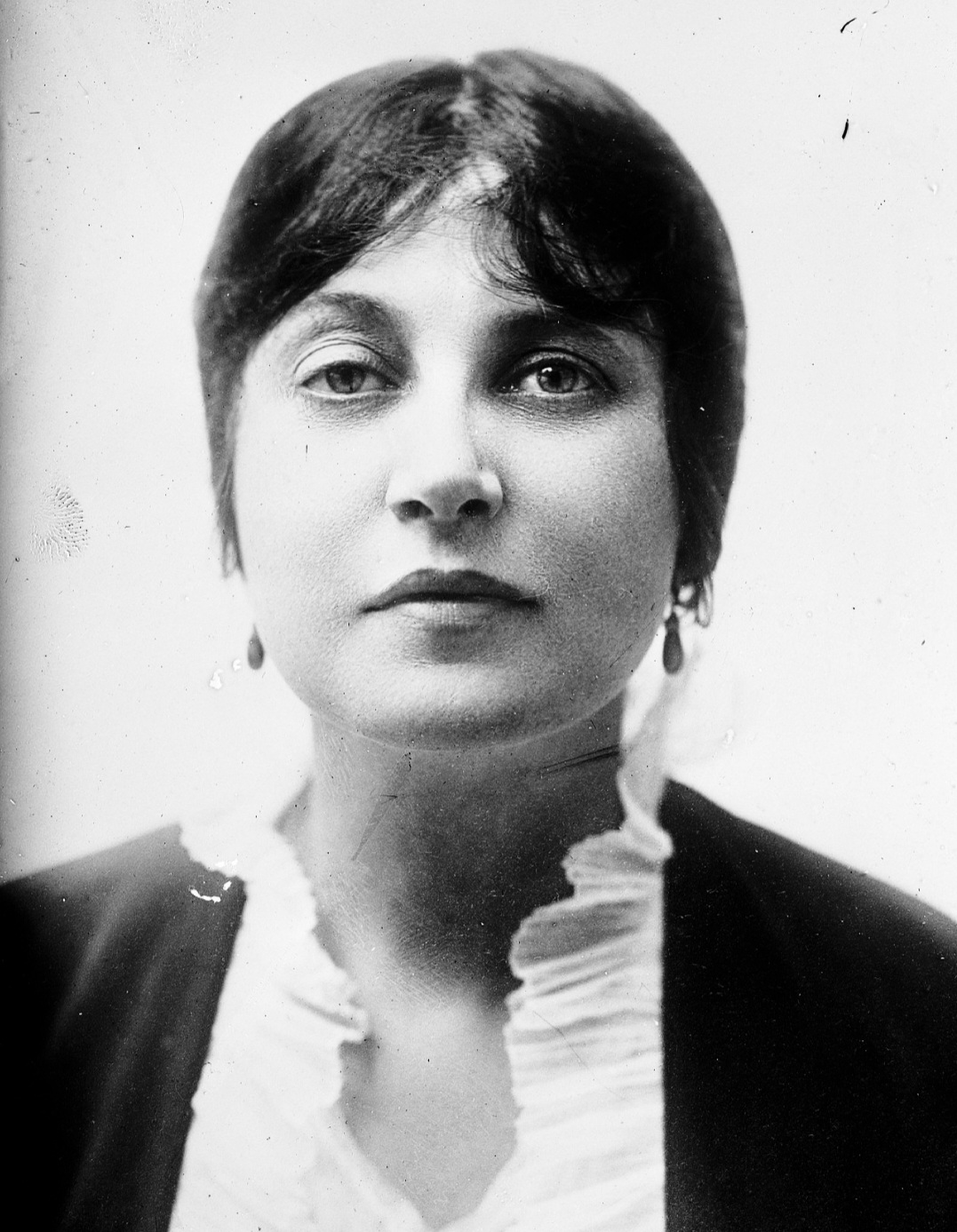
- Caine in the musical Adele (1913)
- Born: Georgiana Caine; October 30, 1876; San Francisco, California U.S.
- Died: April 4, 1964 (aged 87); Hollywood, California U.S.
- Resting place: Valhalla Memorial Park Cemetery
- Occupation: Actress
- Years active: 1899–1950
- Spouse: A. B. Hudson (divorced)

Georgiana Caine (October 30, 1876 – April 4, 1964) was an American actress who performed both on Broadway and in more than 80 films in her 51-year career.

== Early career ==
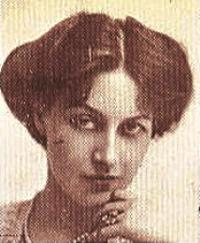
Caine c.1903

Caine was born in San Francisco, California, in 1876, the daughter of two Shakespearean actors, George Caine and the former Jennie Darragh. As a child, she travelled with them when they toured the country. Caine left school at the age of 17 to join a Shakespearean repertory company. She made her Broadway debut in 1899 as the star of the musical A Reign of Error. Caine continued to perform continuously on Broadway as a star or featured performer, primarily in musicals, until the mid-1930s, including in George M. Cohan's Little Nellie Kelly, as well as his Mary, and The O'Brien Girls. She appeared in Franz Lehár's The Merry Widow both on Broadway and in London.

Caine was often written about by theater columnists until the 1930s, when her star had started to fade. She made her last Broadway appearance in 1935, in Damon Runyon and Howard Lindsay's A Slight Case of Murder.

== Film career ==
With her stage career fading, Caine took advantage of the advent of talking pictures to change her focus and moved to California to work in Hollywood. In 1930, Caine made her first film, Good Intentions, and in the next twenty years appeared in 83 films, mostly playing character roles – mothers, aunts, and older neighbors – although she occasionally played against type, such as when she was a streetwalker in Camille (1936). Many of her parts were small and she did not receive screen credit for them. Appearing as Barbara Stanwyck's evil mother in Remember the Night (1940), she became part of Sturges' unofficial "stock company" of character actresses, appearing in seven other films written by Sturges: Christmas in July, The Miracle of Morgan's Creek, Hail the Conquering Hero, The Great Moment, Unfaithfully Yours, The Beautiful Blonde from Bashful Bend and The Sin of Harold Diddlebock.

Caine made her final film appearance in 1950, at the age of 73, in Kiss Tomorrow Goodbye.

== Personal life ==
In the early 1910s, Caine was married to broker A. B. Hudson.

According to Marie Dressler The Unlikeliest Star by Betty Lee, about Caine's friend Marie Dressler, Caine was married to a prominent man from San Francisco by the 1920s, but the book gives no information on what his name was or when or for how long they were married.

Georgia Caine died in Hollywood, California on April 4, 1964, at the age of 87, and is buried in Valhalla Memorial Park Cemetery in North Hollywood, California.

== Partial filmography ==
- Good Intentions (1930) - Miss Huntington
- Night Work (1930) - Mrs. Ten Eyck
- Night Life in Reno (1931) - Catty Bridge Player (uncredited)
- Ambassador Bill (1931) - Monte's Wife (uncredited)
- A Fool's Advice (1932) - Dinner Guest (uncredited)
- High Gear (1933) - Taxicab Customer (uncredited)
- Cradle Song (1933) - Vicaress
- I Am Suzanne (1933) - Mama
- Once to Every Woman (1934)
- Call It Luck (1934) - Amy Lark
- The Count of Monte Cristo (1934) - Mme. De Rosas
- Romance in the Rain (1934) - Mrs. Brown
- Love Time (1934) - Countess Bertaud
- Evelyn Prentice (1934) - Mrs. Newton - Party Guest (uncredited)
- Mutiny Ahead (1935) - Pirate Party Guest (uncredited)
- Naughty Marietta (1935) - Minor Role (uncredited)
- Hooray for Love (1935) - Magenta P. 'The Countess' Schultz
- Dante's Inferno (1935) - Fortune Teller (uncredited)
- The Crusades (1935) - Nun (uncredited)
- She Married Her Boss (1935) - Fitzpatrick (uncredited)
- The Big Broadcast of 1936 (1935) - Matron (uncredited)
- Valley of Wanted Men (1935) - Mrs. Sanderson (uncredited)
- One Rainy Afternoon (1936) - Cecile
- Mariners of the Sky (1936) - Aunt Minnie
- The White Angel (1936) - Mrs. Nightingale
- Camille (1936) - Streetwalker (uncredited)
- Career Woman (1936) - Bridge Player (uncredited)
- Time Out for Romance (1937) - Vera Blanchard
- Bill Cracks Down (1937) - Mrs. Witworth
- The Outcasts of Poker Flat (1937) - Irate Townswoman (uncredited)
- Affairs of Cappy Ricks (1937) - Mrs. Amanda Peasely
- It's Love I'm After (1937) - Mrs. Kane
- 45 Fathers (1937) - Mrs. Bigelow (uncredited)
- Jezebel (1938) - Mrs. Petion (uncredited)
- Women Are Like That (1938) - Mrs. Amelia Brush
- The Amazing Dr. Clitterhouse (1938) - Mrs. Frederick R. Updyke (uncredited)
- His Exciting Night (1938) - Aunt Elizabeth Baker
- Boy Trouble (1939) - Mrs. Ungerlelder
- Dodge City (1939) - Mrs. Irving
- Juarez (1939) - Lady in Waiting
- Honeymoon in Bali (1939) - Miss Stone, Gail's Secretary
- No Place to Go (1939) - Mrs. Bradford
- Hollywood Cavalcade (1939) - Reporter (uncredited)
- Mr. Smith Goes to Washington (1939) - Third Radio Speaker (uncredited)
- Tower of London (1939) - Dowager (uncredited)
- A Child Is Born (1939) - Mrs. Norton's Mother (uncredited)
- Swanee River (1939) - Ann Rowan (uncredited)
- Remember the Night (1940) - Lee's Mother
- The Lone Wolf Meets a Lady (1940) - Mrs. Penyon
- Babies for Sale (1940) - Iris Talbot
- All This, and Heaven Too (1940) - Lady at the Theatre (uncredited)
- Nobody's Children (1940) - Mrs. Marshall
- A Dispatch from Reuters (1940) - Mother in 'Our American Cousin' (uncredited)
- Christmas in July (1940) - Mrs. MacDonald
- Santa Fe Trail (1940) - Officer's Wife at Party (uncredited)
- Ridin' on a Rainbow (1941) - Mariah Bartlett
- The Great Lie (1941) - Mrs. Pine (uncredited)
- The Nurse's Secret (1941) - Miss Griffin
- Hurry, Charlie, Hurry (1941) - Mrs. Georgia Whitley
- Blossoms in the Dust (1941) - Sam's Secretary (uncredited)
- Manpower (1941) - Head Nurse (uncredited)
- You Belong to Me (1941) - Necktie Customer (uncredited)
- Wild Bill Hickok Rides (1942) - Mrs. Oakey (uncredited)
- Hello, Annapolis (1942) - Aunt Arabella
- The Wife Takes a Flyer (1942) - Mrs. Woverman
- Yankee Doodle Dandy (1942) - Boarder (uncredited)
- Gentleman Jim (1942) - Mrs. Geary (uncredited)
- Dr. Gillespie's New Assistant (1942) - Mrs. Kipp (uncredited)
- The Sky's the Limit (1943) - Charwoman (uncredited)
- The Miracle of Morgan's Creek (1943) - Mrs. Johnson (uncredited)
- Mr. Skeffington (1944) - Mrs. Newton (uncredited)
- The Great Moment (1944) - Mrs. Whitman (uncredited)
- Hail the Conquering Hero (1944) - Mrs. Truesmith
- Nora Prentiss (1947) - Birthday Party Guest (uncredited)
- The Sin of Harold Diddlebock (1947) - Bearded Lady
- Living in a Big Way (1947) - Committee Woman (uncredited)
- High Wall (1947) - Miss Twitchell (uncredited)
- A Double Life (1947) - Actress in 'A Gentleman's Gentleman'
- Give My Regards to Broadway (1948) - Mrs. Waldron
- Unfaithfully Yours (1948) - Dowager in Concert Box (uncredited)
- The Beautiful Blonde from Bashful Bend (1949) - Mrs. Hingleman (uncredited)
- Bride for Sale (1949) - Mrs. Willis (uncredited)
- Kiss Tomorrow Goodbye (1950) - Julia (uncredited) (final film role)
