= Robert Greig =

Australian-American actor (1879–1958)

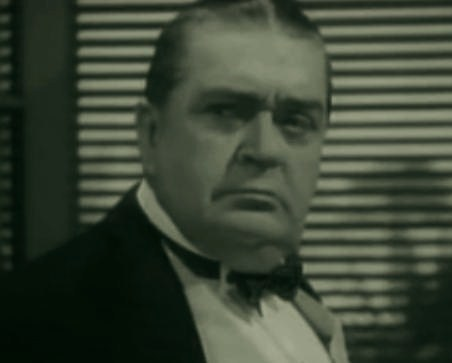
- Greig in Algiers (1938)
- Born: 27 December 1879; Melbourne, Victoria, Australia
- Died: 27 June 1958 (aged 78); Los Angeles, California, U.S.
- Occupation: Actor
- Years active: 1928–1949

Robert Greig (27 December 1879 – 27 June 1958) was an Australian-American actor who appeared in more than 100 films between 1930 and 1949, usually as the dutiful butler. Born Arthur Alfred Bede Greig, he was the nephew of Australian politician and solicitor William Bede Dalley. He was commonly known as "Bob".

== Career ==
Greig was born near Melbourne, in 1878. He married fellow actor Beatrice Denver Holloway in 1912. After a successful career in Melbourne, he and his wife sailed for the United States, and he made his Broadway debut in 1928 in an operetta, Countess Maritza. His next production was the Marx Brothers' comedy Animal Crackers, in which he portrayed "Hives" the butler. He reprised the role in the 1930 film version, which was his movie debut and set the pattern for much of his career, as he was often cast as a butler or other servant.

He performed in several other productions on Broadway, the last in 1938. Greig worked steadily in films, again appearing with the Marx Brothers in Horse Feathers (1932), in which he played a biology professor, and was featured in the 1932 short Jitters the Butler. Notable films in which he broke out of butler-mode were Cockeyed Cavaliers (1934), starring Bert Wheeler and Robert Woolsey, in which Greig played the "Duke of Weskit", Uncle John to Irene Dunne's Theodora in Theodora Goes Wild (1936), and Algiers (1938), in which he was "Giraux", the wealthy and gross protector of Hedy Lamarr's character.

Publicity photo from Sullivan's Travels (1941)

In the 1940s, Greig was part of Preston Sturges's unofficial "stock company" of character actors, appearing in six films written and directed by Sturges. His performances in Sullivan's Travels, The Lady Eve and The Palm Beach Story, in which he played a member of the "Ale & Quail Club", were among his best.

Greig's last film was Bride of Vengeance, a 1949 Paulette Goddard vehicle, in which he played the uncredited part of a "Councillor".

== Death ==
Greig died in Los Angeles on 27 June 1958, at the age of 78: he is buried in Holy Cross Cemetery in Culver City, California.

== Filmography ==
Chico Marx, Greig, and Harpo Marx in his film debut, Animal Crackers (1930)

- Paramount on Parade (1930) - Minor Role (film debut) (uncredited)
- Animal Crackers (1930) - Hives, the butler
- No Limit (1931) - Doorman (uncredited)
- Born to Love (1931) - Hansom Cabby (uncredited)
- Tonight or Never (1931) - Conrad
- Stepping Sisters (1932) - Jepson
- Lovers Courageous (1932) - Doorman (uncredited)
- The Cohens and Kellys in Hollywood (1932) - Chesterfield
- Beauty and the Boss (1932) - Chappel
- Man Wanted (1932) - Harper (scenes cut)
- The Tenderfoot (1932) - Mack
- Merrily We Go to Hell (1932) - Baritone Bartender (uncredited)
- Jewel Robbery (1932) - Man Reading 'Wiener Journal' (uncredited)
- Horse Feathers (1932) - Biology Professor Giving Lecture (uncredited)
- Love Me Tonight (1932) - Major Domo Flammand
- Trouble in Paradise (1932) - Jacques, Mariette's butler
- The Conquerors (1932) - Mr. Downey (uncredited)
- They Just Had to Get Married (1932) - Radcliff
- Robbers' Roost (1932) - Tulliver the Butler
- Jitters the Butler (1932 short) - Jitters
- Men Must Fight (1933) - Albert
- Dangerously Yours (1933) - White
- The Mind Reader (1933) - Swami (uncredited)
- Pleasure Cruise (1933) - Crum
- Peg o' My Heart (1933) - Jarvis, butler
- Horse Play (1933) - Hotel Doorman (uncredited)
- Midnight Mary (1933) - Potter - Tom's Butler (uncredited)
- It's Great to Be Alive (1933) - Perkins
- Broadway to Hollywood (1933) - "Diamond Jim" Brady (uncredited)
- Meet the Baron (1933) - Explorer (uncredited)
- Female (1933) - James, Alison's butler (uncredited)
- Easy to Love (1934) - Andrews
- Upper World (1934) - Marc Caldwell, butler
- Stingaree (1934) - The Innkeeper
- The Love Captive (1934) - First Butler
- Madame Du Barry (1934) - The King's Chef (uncredited)
- Cockeyed Cavaliers (1934) - The Duke of Weskit
- One More River (1934) - Blore
- Clive of India (1935) - Mr. Pemberton
- Folies Bergère de Paris (1935) - Henri
- Les Misérables (1935) - Prison Governor at Jean's Release (uncredited)
- Mark of the Vampire (1935) - Fat Man (uncredited)
- Woman Wanted (1935) - Peedles
- The Gay Deception (1935) - Adolph
- The Bishop Misbehaves (1935) - Rosalind
- I Live for Love (1935) - Fat Man Dancing at Nightclub
- Three Live Ghosts (1936) - John Ferguson, Brockton's butler
- Rose Marie (1936) - Hotel Manager
- The Great Ziegfeld (1936) - Ziegfeld's Butler (uncredited)
- The Unguarded Hour (1936) - Henderson
- Small Town Girl (1936) - Childers, Dakin's butler
- Trouble for Two (1936) - Fat Man
- The Devil-Doll (1936) - Emil Coulvet
- Easy to Take (1936) - Judd - Butler
- Theodora Goes Wild (1936) - Uncle John
- Lloyd's of London (1936) - Lord Drayton
- Stowaway (1936) - Captain
- Michael O'Halloran (1937) - Craig, the butler
- The Road Back (1937) - Member of Dinner Party (uncredited)
- Easy Living (1937) - Butler
- My Dear Miss Aldrich (1937) - The Major Domo
- Lady Behave! (1937) - Alfred
- Algiers (1938) - Andre Giraux
- Midnight Intruder (1938) - Willetts, the Reitter Butler
- The Adventures of Marco Polo (1938) - Chamberlain
- You Can't Take It with You (1938) - Lord Melville (uncredited)
- The Law West of Tombstone (1938) - Townsman at Table (uncredited)
- It Could Happen to You (1939) - Pedley
- Way Down South (1939) - Judge Ravenal
- Little Accident (1939) - Butler (uncredited)
- Drums Along the Mohawk (1939) - Mr. Borst
- Tower of London (1939) - Friar Cautioning John Wyatt (uncredited)
- The Honeymoon's Over (1939) - Horace Kellogg
- Charlie McCarthy, Detective (1939) (uncredited)
- No Time for Comedy (1940) - Robert
- The Thief of Bagdad (1940) - Man of Basra (uncredited)
- Hudson's Bay (1941) - Sir Robert
- The Lady Eve (1941) - Burrows
- Moon Over Miami (1941) - Brearley
- Hello, Sucker (1941) - Mr. Watson (uncredited)
- My Life with Caroline (1941) - Albert (uncredited)
- Sullivan's Travels (1941) - Sullivan's Butler
- Son of Fury: The Story of Benjamin Blake (1942) - Judge
- The Mad Martindales (1942) - Wallace Butler
- I Married an Angel (1942) - Oscar (uncredited)
- Tales of Manhattan (1942) - Lazar the Tailor (Boyer sequence) (uncredited)
- The Palm Beach Story (1942) - Third Member Ale and Quail Club
- Girl Trouble (1942) - Fields
- The Moon and Sixpence (1942) - Maitland, Wolfe's valet (uncredited)
- I Married a Witch (1942) - Town Crier
- Laugh Your Blues Away (1942) - Wilfred
- Arabian Nights (1942) - Eunuch
- Three Hearts for Julia (1943) - Cairns, Anton's Butler (uncredited)
- Million Dollar Kid (1944) - Spevin, Cortlands' butler
- Summer Storm (1944) - Gregory, Volsky's butler
- The Great Moment (1944) - Roberts, Morton's butler (uncredited)
- Mrs. Parkington (1944) - Mr. Orlando (uncredited)
- The Picture of Dorian Gray (1945) - Sir Thomas
- Earl Carroll Vanities (1945) - Vonce, the butler
- Hollywood and Vine (1945) - Jenkins
- Nob Hill (1945) - Patton, Curruthers' butler (uncredited)
- The Cheaters (1945) - MacFarland
- Love, Honor and Goodbye (1945) - Charles, the butler
- The Sin of Harold Diddlebock (1947) - Algernon McNiff
- Forever Amber (1947) - Magistrate (uncredited)
- Unfaithfully Yours (1948) - Jules, the valet (uncredited)
- Bride of Vengeance (1949) - Councillor
