= The Guinea Pig =

The Guinea Pig may refer to:

- The Guinea Pig (play), of 1929 by Preston Sturges
- The Guinea Pig (Chetham-Strode), a 1946 play by Warren Chetham-Strode
- The Guinea Pig (film), a 1948 British film starring Richard Attenborough
- The Guinea Pig (comic strip), within the Eagle comic, from 1965 to 1969
- The Guinea Pigs, a novel by Ludvik Vaculik
- Guinea Pig (film series), a series of seven controversial 1980s Japanese exploitation gore-horror films
