= Edyth Totten Theatre =

Former movie theater in Midtown Manhattan, New York City, United States

Coordinates: 40.7609°N 73.9863°W

The Edyth Totten Theatre was a Broadway theatre located at 247 West 48th St in Manhattan. It was situated on 48th St in-between Broadway and Eighth Avenue. It was designed by architect Paul C. Hunter. A smaller venue, it sat just 299 people. It was opened by actress Edyth Totten in 1926 with the drama Secret Sands. This show began seating audiences for preview performances on October 6, 1926. The theatre was re-named the President Theatre beginning with a production of Preston Sturges's The Guinea Pig which opened on January 7, 1929.

It was transformed into a movie theatre called the Hindenburg Theatre featuring German-language language cinema coupled with vaudeville acts by German performers; opening under that name on March 31, 1932. In 1933 it was re-named the Caruso Theatre when it became a venue for Italian cinema; including a screening of La donna di una notte in March 1933. When live theatre returned to the venue in December 1933 with the play No Mother to Guide Her it was briefly re-named the Midget Theatre, but by January 1934 was once again the President Theatre while this same play was still running at the venue.

By November 1934 the theatre was re-named the Artef Theatre; taking on that name when it became the resident venue of the leftist Yiddish theatre group Arbeter Teater Farband. When this group left the venue in 1937, the theatre was breifly retitled the Acme Theatre when it once again became a cinema. It was rebranded American Show Shop when live theatre returned in December 1937 with the play Murder Sails at Midnight. In 1938 it was called Show Shop when it showed films, and was rebranded the 48th Street Theatre after a close-by theatre of the same name was rebranded the Windsor Theatre. It became the President Theatre once again 1943.

The final name of the venue was Erwin Piscator's Dramatic Workshop. It was active as a theatre until 1956 when it was purchased by the restaurant Mamma Leone's and converted into a market. The building was demolished in 1988.
