= The Beautiful Blonde from Bashful Bend =

1949 film by Preston Sturges

- theatrical poster
- Directed by: Preston Sturges
- Written by: Earl Felton (story); Preston Sturges
- Produced by: Preston Sturges
- Starring: Betty Grable
- Cinematography: Harry Jackson
- Edited by: Robert Fritch
- Music by: Cyril J. Mockridge
- Distributed by: Twentieth-Century Fox
- Release dates: May 27, 1949 (New York City/Los Angeles); June 1949 (U.S.)
- Running time: 77 minutes
- Country: United States
- Language: English
- Budget: $2,192,000
- Box office: $2,889,000 (US)

The Beautiful Blonde from Bashful Bend is a 1949 romantic comedy Western film starring Betty Grable and featuring Cesar Romero and Rudy Vallee. It was directed by Preston Sturges and written by him based on a story by Earl Felton.

The film, Sturges' first Technicolor production, was not well received at the time it was released, and was generally conceded to be a disaster – even Betty Grable bad-mouthed it – but its reputation has improved somewhat over time, though it is not considered to be in the same league as the intelligent comedies Sturges made at Paramount Pictures for which he is known.

The Beautiful Blonde from Bashful Bend would turn out to be the last American film on which Sturges would work – although he would receive credit for films that were remakes or adaptations of his earlier films. Sturges directed only one more film in his life, the 1955 French comedy Les carnets du Major Thompson (released in the U.S. as The French, They Are a Funny Race).

== Plot ==
Hot-headed Winifred "Freddie" Jones is a saloon singer in the Old West who catches her boyfriend, gambler Blackie Jobero, flirting with another woman and takes a shot at him with the six-shooter she always carries. Unfortunately, she hits a judge in the rear end instead, so her friend Conchita and she take it on the lam. When they get to a tiny hole-in-the-wall town, Freddie and Conchita are mistaken for the new schoolmarm and her Indian maid. They meet the local muckety-mucks, including wealthy Charles Hingelman, owner of a valuable gold mine, who starts to romance Freddie. When Blackie shows up while tracking Freddie down, complications and hilarious chaos ensue.

== Cast ==
- Betty Grable as Winifred "Freddie" Jones
- Cesar Romero as Blackie Jobero
- Rudy Vallee as Charles Hingleman
- Olga San Juan as Conchita
- Porter Hall as Judge Alfalfa J. O'Toole
- Margaret Hamilton as Mrs. O'Toole
- Hugh Herbert as Doctor
- Al Bridge as Sheriff Ambrose
- El Brendel as Mr. Jorgensen
- Sterling Holloway as Basserman Boy
- Dan Jackson as Basserman Boy
- Emory Parnell as Mr. Julius Hingleman
- Pati Behrs as Roulette
- Richard Hale as Gus Basserman
- Chris-Pin Martin as Joe the Bartender

== Songs ==
- "The Beautiful Blonde from Bashful Bend" - by Lionel Newman and Don George
- "Clementine Capers" - by Cyril Mockridge
- "Every Time I Meet You" - by Josef Myrow (music) and Mack Gordon (words)
- "In the Gloaming" - by Annie Fortesque Harrison and Meta Orred

== Production ==
Earl Felton's original screen story was titled "The Lady from Laredo", and the film had the working titles of "Teacher's Pet" and "The Blonde from Bashful Bend". The film had been scheduled to go into production in September 1947, but was "temporarily shelved" in October because Fox production head Darryl F. Zanuck was concerned about the high cost of doing a film in Technicolor. While the production was delayed, Sturges made Unfaithfully Yours (1948) as his first film for Fox.

An early draft of the screen play, dated 29 December 1947 indicates that Sturges was considering June Haver in the role of Freddie, though Betty Grable had already been announced as starring. In the script, Sturges wrote:

It is my habit, when writing a play, to cast the parts as, in my mind, each character makes his first appearance. Occasionally, a stranger walks in and I am uneasy about his looks and the sound of his voice, but usually as he pauses in the doorway I recognize an old friend whose talents I admire and about whose fitness for the part I have no doubts.

As was usually the case on Sturges' films, the censors at the Hays Office had concerns about the script for The Beautiful Blonde... which had been submitted to them. Joseph Breen, head of the Production Code, warned Fox that it "contains entirely too much dialogue and action which concerns itself – in a quite blunt and pointed way – with sex." The office approved a draft script submitted on 23 September 1948.

The Beautiful Blonde... was in production from late September to late November 1948, with an additional sequence shot in early January 1949. Whether Sturges or another director worked on the January shoot, which was to change the ending of the film at the insistence of Zanuck, is unclear.

== Release ==
The film premiered in Hollywood and New York City on 27 May 1949 and went into general American release in June. It was marketed with the tagline: "She had the biggest Six-Shooters in the West!"

The film was budgeted at an estimated $2,260,000 and brought in during its initial American release only about $1,489,000. The Beautiful Blonde from Bashful Bend was released on video in the U.S. on 25 May 1989.

Variety listed the film as a box office disappointment.
