= Unfaithfully Yours (1984 film) =

1984 film by Howard Zieff

- Theatrical release poster by Drew Struzan
- Directed by: Howard Zieff
- Written by: Valerie Curtin; Barry Levinson; Robert Klane
- Based on: Unfaithfully Yours; 1948 film by Preston Sturges
- Produced by: Joe Wizan; Marvin Worth
- Starring: Dudley Moore; Nastassja Kinski; Armand Assante; Cassie Yates; Richard Libertini; Albert Brooks
- Cinematography: David M. Walsh
- Edited by: Sheldon Kahn
- Music by: Bill Conti (score); Stephen Bishop (song)
- Production company: 20th Century Fox
- Distributed by: 20th Century Fox
- Release date: February 10, 1984
- Running time: 96 minutes
- Country: United States
- Language: English
- Budget: $12 million
- Box office: $19,928,200

Unfaithfully Yours is a 1984 American romantic comedy film directed by Howard Zieff, starring Dudley Moore and Nastassja Kinski and featuring Armand Assante and Albert Brooks. The screenplay was written by Valerie Curtin, Barry Levinson, and Robert Klane based on Preston Sturges' screenplay for his 1948 film of the same name. The original music score is by Bill Conti and the song "Unfaithfully Yours (One Love)" was written for the film and performed by Stephen Bishop.

== Plot ==
Claude Eastman is a composer and the conductor of a prestigious symphony who has recently married beautiful Daniella, a much younger woman. While traveling, he sends a message to his friend Norman Robbins to keep an eye on Daniella but the message is garbled by Claude's Italian valet Giuseppe and Norman hires private detective Jess Keller to investigate Daniella.

Keller's report, which comes with a fuzzy video, is that Daniella had an assignation with a man who, by wearing Argyle socks, appears to be Maxmillian Stein, a handsome violinist with the orchestra – and Claude's protégé – who is well known as a ladies man. In fact, Max merely used Claude's flat for an assignation with Norman's wife Carla.

Claude attempts to surprise Max and Daniella together, leading Max and Carla to believe that he knows about their affair. When Max eventually meets Daniella, it is at a restaurant where Claude, overwhelmed with jealousy, duels Max with violins by playing a Csárdás, the famous composition of Vittorio Monti.

Claude separately confronts both Daniella and Max. Daniella feels guilty because she is keeping Max and Carla's affair a secret from Claude, while Max apologizes only for using Claude's flat for the affair. Not realizing that Claude believes Max was meeting Daniella, neither of them clarifies that Max was meeting Carla and Claude takes this as confirmation of his suspicions, while he is enraged by their apparent lack of contrition. He plots to kill both of them.

As Claude conducts Pyotr Ilyich Tchaikovsky's "Violin Concerto", a plan to kill Daniella and frame Max for the murder runs through his mind, leaving him laughing hysterically but afterwards, when he tries to carry out his plan, unforeseen circumstances intervene.

Keller realizes his mistake after seeing Carla leave Claude's apartment on the tape. After failing to catch Claude at the concert to explain, he goes to Claude's flat and interrupts him while he is struggling to carry out his murder plan. Daniella is initially furious when she learns the truth - seemingly more because Claude believed she was unfaithful than because he planned to kill her - and leaves. Claude rushes after her and explains that he loves her but does not think he can stop being jealous and the two reconcile.

== Cast ==
- Dudley Moore as Claude Eastman
- Nastassja Kinski as Daniella Eastman
- Armand Assante as Maxmillian Stein
- Albert Brooks as Norman Robbins
- Cassie Yates as Carla Robbins
- Richard Libertini as Giuseppe
- Richard B. Shull as Jess Keller
- Jan Triska as Jerzy Czyrek
- Jane Hallaren as Janet
- Bernard Behrens as Bill Lawrence
- Leonard Mann as Screen Lover
- Betty Shabazz ad Woman in Plaza

== Production ==
The remake of Preston Sturges' 1948 film, which was an artistic success but not a financial one, was originally intended for Peter Sellers before his death in 1980.

== Reception ==
Unfaithfully Yours received generally mixed to negative reviews from critics, and currently holds a 33% "Rotten" approval rating at review aggregator Rotten Tomatoes. In spite of the lukewarm critical reception, the film was a minor commercial success.
