= Remember the Night =

1940 film by Mitchell Leisen

- Theatrical release poster
- Directed by: Mitchell Leisen
- Written by: Preston Sturges
- Produced by: Mitchell Leisen; Albert Lewis (uncredited)
- Starring: Barbara Stanwyck; Fred MacMurray; Beulah Bondi; Elizabeth Patterson; Sterling Holloway
- Cinematography: Ted Tetzlaff
- Edited by: Doane Harrison
- Music by: Frederick Hollander
- Production company: Paramount Pictures
- Distributed by: Paramount Pictures
- Release date: January 19, 1940
- Running time: 94 minutes
- Country: United States
- Language: English

Remember the Night is a 1940 American Christmas romantic comedy trial film directed by Mitchell Leisen and starring Barbara Stanwyck and Fred MacMurray. The film was written by Preston Sturges and was the last of his scripts shot by another director, as Sturges began his own directorial career the same year with The Great McGinty.

== Plot ==
Lee Leander is arrested for stealing a bracelet from a New York City jewelry store. The assistant district attorney, John "Jack" Sargent, is assigned to prosecute her. The trial begins just before Christmas, but to avoid facing a jury filled with the holiday spirit, Jack has the trial postponed on a technicality.

When he hears Lee complaining to her lawyer about spending Christmas in jail, Jack feels guilty and asks bondsman Fat Mike to post bail. Fat Mike assumes that Jack intends to seduce Lee, and after he posts bail for her, he delivers her to Jack's apartment. Discovering that Lee is a fellow Hoosier (native of Indiana), and that she has nowhere to spend Christmas, Jack offers to drop her off at her mother's house on his way to visit his own family.

On the drive, Jack gets lost in Pennsylvania and the pair spends the night parked in a field. The next morning, they are arrested by the landowner for trespassing and destruction of property, and taken to an unfriendly justice of the peace. Lee starts a fire in his wastebasket as a distraction, and the pair flees. Lee's mother, a malevolent, embittered woman, has remarried, and does not want a relationship with her daughter, whom she considers a lost cause.

Jack takes Lee home to spend Christmas with his family. She is warmly received by Jack's cousin Willie, aunt Emma, and his mother, even after Jack reveals Lee's past. On New Year's Eve, Jack kisses Lee at a barn dance, and later that night, his mother visits Lee's bedroom for a talk. She reveals that the family was poor during Jack's childhood, and that he worked hard to put himself through college and law school. She asks Lee to give Jack up, rather than jeopardize his career, and Lee agrees.

On the way back to New York via Canada and Niagara Falls (to bypass Pennsylvania), Jack tells Lee that he loves her, and tries to persuade her to jump bail, but she refuses. Back in New York, Jack tries to lose Lee's case by using harsh and aggressive questioning to force the jury to sympathize with her. Jack's boss has been alerted about the affair, and secretly listens outside the courtroom. Realizing that Jack may damage his career, Lee changes her plea to guilty. As she is led away, Jack wants to marry Lee on the spot. She refuses, saying that if he still feels the same way after she has completed her prison term and he has had time to consider his decision, they can marry. She asks that he only stand beside her and hold her hand during her sentencing, and he promises to do so.

== Cast ==
- Barbara Stanwyck as Lee Leander
- Fred MacMurray as John Sargent
- Beulah Bondi as Mrs. Sargent
- Elizabeth Patterson as Aunt Emma
- Willard Robertson as Francis X. O'Leary
- Sterling Holloway as "Chilly" Willie Simms
- Charles Waldron as judge (New York)
- Paul Guilfoyle as district attorney, John's boss
- Charlie Arnt as Tom
- John Wray as Hank
- Thomas W. Ross as Mr. Emory, Pennsylvania judge
- Snowflake as Rufus, John's servant
- Tom Kennedy as "Fat" Mike, the bail bondsman
- Georgia Caine as Lee's mother
- Virginia Brissac as Mrs. Emory
- Spencer Charters as judge at rummage sale
- Martha Mears as nightclub singer (uncredited)

== Development and production ==
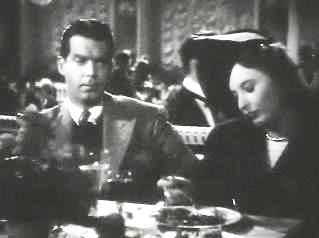
Fred MacMurray and Barbara Stanwyck in a trailer for Remember the Night

Preston Sturges suggested Great Love as a title for the film. The script, which blends a number of genres, proved difficult to write, and Sturges joked that it caused him "... to commit hara-kiri several times." As with all of Sturges' scripts, Remember the Night included a number of elements from his own life, including the falling-in-love-on-a-journey motif, inspired by his experience with Eleanor Post Hutton on the road to Palm Beach many years before, and the character of Jack's tough but loving Midwestern mother, based on the mother of his third wife Louise Sargent, from whom the lead character's name derived.

Director Mitchell Leisen shortened Sturges' script considerably, both before and during shooting. This annoyed Sturges, and was one of the main reasons fueling his determination to direct his own scripts thereafter, which he did beginning with his next project, The Great McGinty. However, of all the films that Sturges wrote before he began directing, Leisen directed the only two films (Remember the Night and Easy Living) that Sturges bought for his personal film library. This film also contains a number of references to Easy Living; for instance, in the supper club where MacMurray takes Stanwyck for dinner, the song "Easy Living" plays, and when Stanwyck gives a false name to a justice of the peace, she uses "Mary Smith", the name of Jean Arthur's character in Easy Living.

Leisen's script alterations shifted the film's focus from MacMurray's character to that of Stanwyck. They also changed the character of Jack in line with MacMurray's strengths; in Sturges' original screenplay, the lawyer was a dashing, articulate and slightly theatrical character, but Leisen felt that MacMurray did not possess the verbal abilities needed for the heroic speeches assigned to his character. Instead, Leisen cut much of the dialogue and focused on MacMurray's quiet strength.

Sturges summarized the film by saying, "Love reformed her and corrupted him." The film, he said, "... had quite a lot of schmaltz [sentiment], a good dose of schmerz [pain, grief] and just enough schmutz [dirt] to make it box office."

During shooting, Sturges was present on set and came to know Barbara Stanwyck. One day, he told her that he was going to write a screwball comedy for her, which came just a year later, The Lady Eve. Stanwyck later recalled that she did not initially believe Sturges' promise, as she was primarily a dramatic actress known for playing fallen women and femme fatales.

Remember the Night was in production from July 27 to September 8, 1939. It was completed eight days ahead of schedule and $50,000 under budget, which Leisen attributed to Stanwyck's professionalism, saying "She never blew one line through the whole picture. She set that kind of pace and everybody worked harder, trying to outdo her."

Remember the Night was the first film pairing of MacMurray and Stanwyck; they later co-starred in Double Indemnity (1944), The Moonlighter (1953) and There's Always Tomorrow (1956). Stanwyck was to make a romantic film with Joel McCrea following the completion of Remember the Night, but she came down with a serious eye infection and had to withdraw from the project.

Willard Robertson plays Francis X. O'Leary, Lee's flamboyant lawyer who is said to be a former actor. Robertson was actually a former lawyer in Texas who had turned to acting.

== Reception ==
The theatrical release was well received. The New York Times reviewer Frank S. Nugent wrote:

It is a memorable film, in title and in quality, blessed with an honest script, good direction and sound performances ... a drama stated in the simplest human terms of comedy and sentiment, tenderness and generosity ... warm, pleasant and unusually entertaining.

Remember the Night currently holds a 100% rating on the review-aggregator website Rotten Tomatoes, based on 12 reviews.

== Home media ==
Universal Studios released NTSC editions of the film on VHS on September 12, 1995, and on DVD on October 18, 2010. A Region A Blu-ray edition was made available on November 13, 2018. Odeon Entertainment released a Region 2 DVD on November 3, 2014.

== Adaptations ==
The film was twice adapted as a one-hour radio play on Lux Radio Theatre; on March 25, 1940, with McMurray and Stanwyck reprising their roles, and on December 22, 1941, with McMurray now paired with Jean Arthur.

Lux Video Theatre presented a television adaptation of the film on May 5, 1955, starring Dennis O'Keefe and Jan Sterling. It was directed by Richard Goode and Buzz Kulik from an adaptation by S.H. Barnett.

The story outline was used unofficially in an episode of Stanwyck's television series The Big Valley ("Judgement [sic] in Heaven", season 1, episode 15).

Lifetime aired a television film in 1997 titled On the 2nd Day of Christmas, starring Mary Stuart Masterson and Mark Ruffalo, directed by James Frawley. The plot is similar to that of Remember the Night.

== See also ==
- List of Christmas films
