= 36 Hours to Kill =

1936 film by Eugene Forde

- Theatrical release poster
- Directed by: Eugene Forde
- Screenplay by: Lou Breslow; John Patrick
- Story by: W. R. Burnett
- Produced by: Sol M. Wurtzel
- Starring: Brian Donlevy; Gloria Stuart; Douglas Fowley; Isabel Jewell; Stepin Fetchit; Julius Tannen
- Cinematography: Arthur C. Miller
- Edited by: Louis R. Loeffler
- Production company: 20th Century Fox
- Distributed by: 20th Century Fox
- Release date: July 24, 1936
- Running time: 66 minutes
- Country: United States
- Language: English

36 Hours to Kill is a 1936 American drama film directed by Eugene Forde, written by Lou Breslow and John Patrick and starring Brian Donlevy, Gloria Stuart, Douglas Fowley, Isabel Jewell, Stepin Fetchit and Julius Tannen. It is based on the short story "Across the Aisle" by W. R. Burnett. The film was released on July 24, 1936, by 20th Century-Fox.

== Plot ==
Duke and Jeanie Benson, an outlaw couple hiding under assumed names in a calm, suburban community, read a newspaper article about a sweepstakes winner who has not yet claimed his prize. Duke realizes that he has the winning ticket and will win $150,000 if he can claim the jackpot while avoiding apprehension. Tired of suburban life, Duke decides to board a train to Kansas City, where he bought the ticket, while Jeanie plans to fly there and have a third person claim the winnings. At the train station, reporter Frank Evers boards the train and meets Duke. At San Bernardino, Anne Marvis boards the train. Finding the door to Duke's room open, Anne hides in his bed.

Duke is attracted to Anne, as is Frank. When Jeanie boards the train because her plane was grounded, she suspects that Duke and Anne are having an affair and draws a gun. However, Duke calms her fears by introducing Frank as Anne's husband, and Anne and Frank participate in the ruse. Sometime later, Frank accompanies the train conductor to a room next to Duke's, where they listen through a surveillance device to Duke and Jeanie bicker about their plans to have their gang meet them in Kansas City. Frank, a G-man, hopes to nab the whole gang and forestalls arresting Duke. After Jeanie leaves the train at Albuquerque to board a plane to Kansas City, Duke tries to flirt with Anne, but she rejects his advances. That night, Anne reveals that she is a Los Angeles reporter who has been subpoenaed to testify before a grand jury concerning a political scandal that she had unearthed.

When Frank continues to claim that he is a reporter, Anne indignantly reveals that she works for the newspaper and knows that he does not. In Topeka, after a porter inadvertently finds the listening device in Duke's room, Duke slugs the conductor. Anne receives a wire telling her that it is clear for her to return to Los Angeles, she disembarks. When Duke sees Frank pursuing him, he enters Anne's taxi. They go to a sanitarium, where Duke meets Jeanie, who is unhappy to see him with Anne. When Duke learns that another man has claimed the lottery prize, he sends his shyster lawyer Rickert to dispute the claim to the insurance company that handles the contest. While Rickert is away, Duke kisses Anne and asks her to leave with him after he collects the money. Anne agrees, but he locks her in her room anyway. Jeanie then unbolts the shutters of Anne's room to help her escape, and Anne hitches a ride on a truck, but the driver works for Duke's gang and returns her to the sanitarium. Upon deducing that Jeanie allowed Anne to escape, Duke slugs Jeanie. Frank, impersonating an insurance agent, accompanies Rickert to the sanitarium. Duke shoots Frank as a carload of agents arrive and then unlocks Anne's door to take her with him, but Jeanie shoots him and then cries over his body. The gang is captured, and Anne is pleased to see that Frank is only wounded. Frank and Anne again ride the train as a married couple.

== Cast ==
- Brian Donlevy as Frank Evers
- Gloria Stuart as Anne Marvis
- Douglas Fowley as Duke Benson
- Isabel Jewell as Jeanie Benson
- Stepin Fetchit as Flash
- Julius Tannen as Dr. Borden
- Warren Hymer as Hazy
- Romaine Callender as Simpkins
- James Burke as Doyle
- Jonathan Hale as Conductor
- Gloria Mitzi Carpenter as Gertrude
- Charles Lane as Rickert

== Reception ==
Clarke Wales of the Detroit Free Press wrote: "This picture is no different from and no better or worse than the general run of films made for double bills."

Edward E. Gloss of the Akron Beacon Journal wrote: "Excitement is reasonably well sustained and the picture throughout avoids trying to maintain the heavy menace which marked the earlier entries in G-man celluloid."

Lionel Collier, for the British magazine, Picturegoer, described the film as a "conventional G-man melodrama which lacks pace, but has good romantic interest and quite an exciting gun-play climax." He regarded the performances positively and wrote, "Brian Donlevy gives a sound enough performance … Douglas Fowley is very good as the elusive crook and Gloria Stuart manages to make Ann a sympathetic character."
