= Preston Sturges =

American film director and screenwriter

- Born: Edmund Preston Biden; August 29, 1898; Chicago, Illinois, U.S.
- Died: August 6, 1959 (aged 60); New York City, New York, U.S.
- Resting place: Ferncliff Cemetery
- Occupations: Playwright; screenwriter; film director; inventor
- Years active: 1928–1956
- Spouses: Estelle de Wolf Mudge (m. 1923; div. 1928) Eleanor Close Hutton (m. 1930; ann. 1932) Louise Sargent Tevis (m. 1938; div. 1947) Anne Margaret "Sandy" Nagle (m. 1951)
- Children: 3, including Tom Sturges
- Relatives: Shannon Sturges (granddaughter)

Preston Sturges (/ˈstɜːrdʒɪs/; born Edmund Preston Biden; August 29, 1898 – August 6, 1959) was an American playwright, inventor, screenwriter, and film director.

He is credited as the first screenwriter to find success as a director. Prior to Sturges, other Hollywood directors (such as Charlie Chaplin and Frank Capra) had directed films from their own scripts; however, Sturges is often regarded as the first Hollywood figure to establish success as a screenwriter and then move into directing his own scripts. He sold the story for The Great McGinty to Paramount Pictures for $10 in exchange for directing it. Anthony Lane writes that "To us, that seems old hat, one of the paths by which the ambitious get to run their own show, but back in 1940, when The Great McGinty came out, it was very new hat indeed; the opening credits proclaimed 'Written and directed by Preston Sturges,' and it was the first time in the history of talkies that the two passive verbs had appeared together onscreen. From that conjunction sprang a whole tradition of filmmaking: literate, spiky, defensive, markedly personal, and almost always funny." For that film, Sturges won the first Academy Award for Best Original Screenplay.

Sturges received Oscar nominations for The Miracle of Morgan's Creek and Hail the Conquering Hero (both 1944). He also wrote and directed The Lady Eve, Sullivan's Travels (both 1941) and The Palm Beach Story (1942), all appearing on the American Film Institute's 100 Years...100 Laughs list.

His career is chronicled in Preston Sturges: The Rise and Fall of an American Dreamer.

== Early life ==
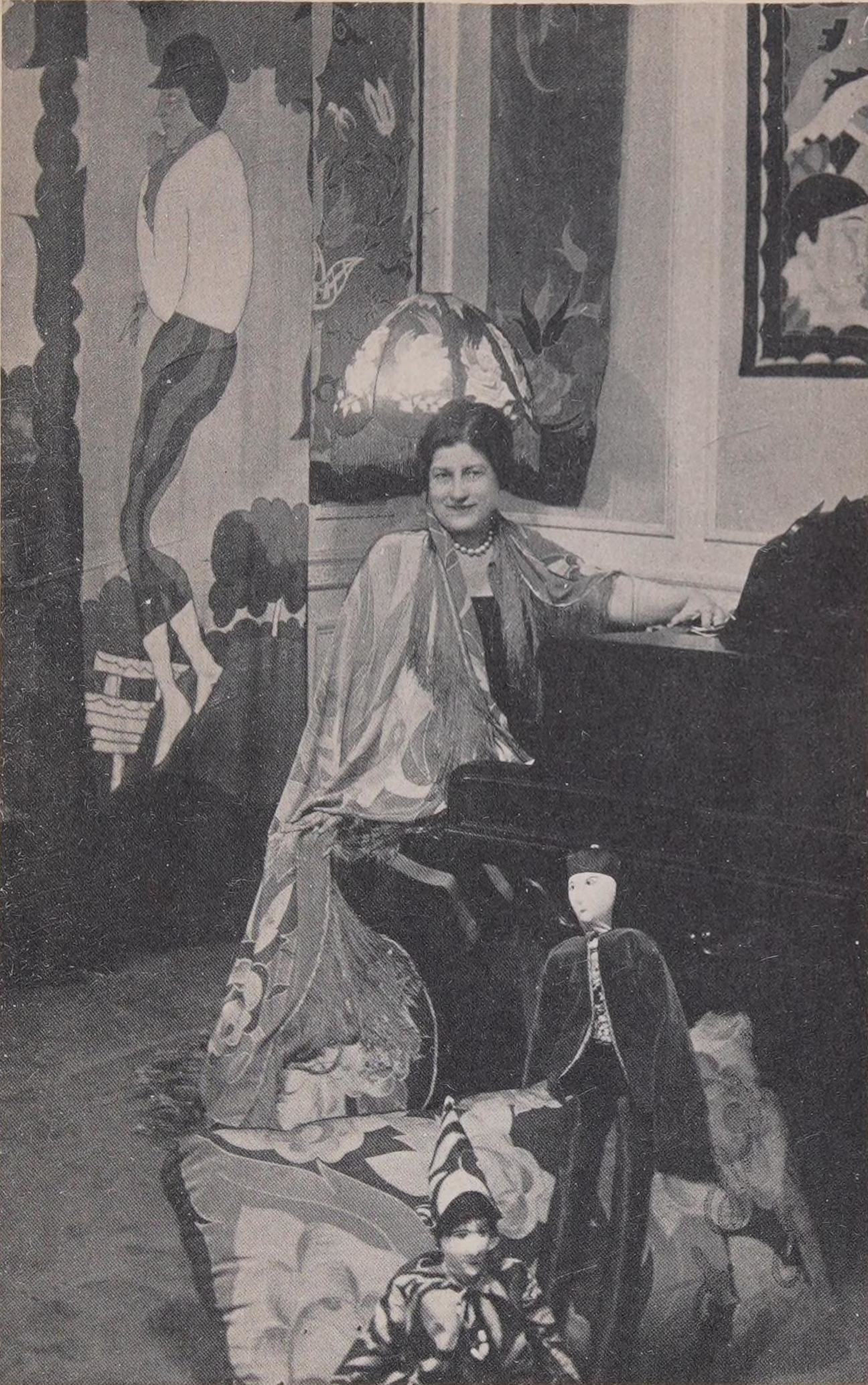
Mary Desti in her studio, New York

Sturges was born in Chicago to Mary Estelle Dempsey (later known as Mary Desti and Mary D'Esti), who was born in Quebec in 1871 and died in New York City in 1931, and the traveling salesman Edmund C. Biden (1871–1935). His father died of a heart attack after being arrested for issuing a bad check. His maternal grandparents, Catherine Campbell Smyth and Dominick d'Este Dempsey, were immigrants from Ireland and his father was of English descent.

When Sturges was two years old, his mother left America to pursue a singing career in Paris, where she annulled her marriage with Preston's father. Returning to America, Dempsey met her third husband, the wealthy stockbroker Solomon Sturges (1865–1940), who married her in 1901, and adopted Preston in 1902. According to biographers, Solomon Sturges was "diametrically opposite to Mary and her bohemianism". This included her close friendship with Isadora Duncan. Mary also carried on a romantic affair with Aleister Crowley who wrote about her in his novel Moonchild, and she collaborated with him on his magnum opus Magick. As Mary Desti, she was the owner of Desti Beauty Products, a cosmetics firm and New York City studio which sold art objects, perfumes, and clothing. She wrote as Mary Desti (1929) The untold story: the life of Isadora Duncan, 1921-1927.

As a young man, Sturges bounced back and forth between the United States and Europe, where he would sometimes travel from country to country with Duncan's dance company. As Sturges spent much of his youth in France, he became fluent in French and a Francophile who always considered France his "second home".

In 1916, he worked as a runner for New York stock brokers, a position he obtained through Solomon Sturges. The next year, he enlisted in the United States Army Air Service, and graduated as a lieutenant from Camp Dick in Texas without seeing action. While at camp, Sturges wrote an essay, "Three Hundred Words of Humor", which was printed in the camp newspaper, becoming his first published work. Returning from camp, in 1919 Sturges picked up a managing position at the Desti Emporium in New York, a store owned by his mother's fourth husband. He spent eight years there, until he married Estelle De Wolfe.

Sturges's 1928 turn to playwriting was accidental. While on a date with a young actress of certain renown, she informed Sturges that while she had pretended to find him witty and charming, she actually considered him a bore. "The only reason I'm going out with you, sir, is for the same reason that a scientist embraces a guinea pig; I just like to try my situations out on you to see how they turn out." She claimed that the dramatic research was for a play she was writing. Outraged, Sturges told her that if she could write a play, he could write a play, but that his would be better and run longer. Within two months, he had written his first play, The Guinea Pig, only to find out that she wasn't writing a play at all, and that she was surprised and flattered that he had taken her ravings so seriously.

== Career ==
=== From Broadway to Hollywood ===
In 1928, Sturges performed on Broadway in Hotbed, a short-lived play by Paul Osborn. Sturges' The Guinea Pig opened at the President Theatre on January 7, 1929, after first opening locally at The Wharf Theater in Provincetown, Massachusetts; it was a turning point in his career. Also in 1928 Sturges's second play, the hit Strictly Dishonorable opened. Written in just six days, the play ran for sixteen months and earned Sturges over $300,000. It attracted interest from Hollywood, and Sturges was writing for Paramount by the end of the year.

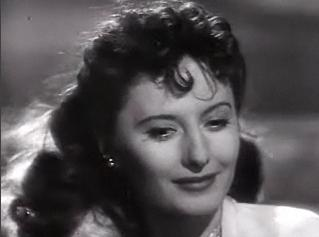
Barbara Stanwyck in The Lady Eve (1941)

Three other Sturges stage plays were produced from 1930 to 1932, one of them a musical, but none were hits. By the end of the year, he was working more in Hollywood as a writer-for-hire, operating on short contracts, for Universal, MGM, and Columbia studios. He also sold his original screenplay for The Power and the Glory (1933) to Fox, where it was filmed as a vehicle for Spencer Tracy. The film is about a self-involved financier and uses a series of flashbacks and flash-forwards. It is sometimes seen as being a precursor to Citizen Kane (1941). Fox producer Jesse Lasky had been prepared to customarily pass Sturges's screenplay along to other writers for rewriting, but said, "It was the most perfect script I'd ever seen... Imagine a producer accepting a script from an author and not being able to make one change." Lasky paid Sturges $17,500 plus 7% of the profits above $1 million. It was a then-unprecedented deal for a screenwriter, which instantly elevated Sturges's reputation in Hollywood—although the lucrative deal irritated as many as it impressed. Sturges recalled, "The film made a lot of enemies. Writers at that time worked in teams, like piano movers. And my first solo script was considered a distinct menace to the profession."

For the remainder of the 1930s, Sturges operated under the strict auspices of the studio system, working on a string of scripts, some of which were shelved, sometimes with screen credit and sometimes not. While he was highly paid, earning $2,500 a week, he was unhappy with the way directors were handling his dialogue, and he resolved to take creative control of his own projects. He accomplished this goal in 1939 by trading his screenplay for The Great McGinty (written six years earlier) to Paramount in exchange for the chance to direct it. Paramount promoted the unusual deal as part of the film's publicity, saying that Sturges had received just ten dollars. Sturges's success quickly paved the way for similar deals for such writer–directors as Billy Wilder and John Huston. Sturges said, "It's taken me eight years to reach what I wanted. But now, if I don't run out of ideas—and I won't—we'll have some fun. There are some wonderful pictures to be made, and God willing, I will make some of them."

In 1941, Sturges opened the Players, a three-story restaurant and nightclub, at 8225 Sunset Boulevard, across from the Chateau Marmont. with a drive-in on the ground floor and a French restaurant on the top floor with a revolving bandstand. Sturges worked on movies all day and then hung out all evening at the Players. His investments in entrepreneurial projects, such as Sturges engineering company, and the Players restaurant, were ongoing net losses. Despite being at one point, the third highest paid man in America, for writing, directing, producing, and numerous other Hollywood projects, he was often known to borrow money (from his stepfather, his studio, and others).

=== Screenwriting heights ===
Sturges won the first-ever Academy Award for Writing Original Screenplay for The Great McGinty, at which time he was one of the highest paid men in Hollywood. He also received two screenwriting Academy Award nominations in the same year, for 1944's Hail the Conquering Hero and The Miracle of Morgan's Creek, a feat since matched by Frank Butler, Francis Ford Coppola, and Oliver Stone. (In the second Academy Awards, under a different nomination process, eleven screenplays were considered, including two by Bess Meredyth, two by Tom Barry, two by Hanns Kräly and four by Elliott J. Clawson.) F. Scott Fitzgerald, then in Hollywood, wrote "They let a certain writer here direct his own picture here, and he's made such a go of it that there may be a different feeling about that soon."

Although he had a thirty-year Hollywood career, Sturges's greatest comedies were filmed in a furious five-year burst of activity from 1939 to 1944, during which he turned out McGinty, Christmas in July, The Lady Eve, Sullivan's Travels, The Palm Beach Story, The Miracle of Morgan's Creek and Hail the Conquering Hero, for each of which he served as both writer and director.

=== Studio battles ===
Production on these films did not always go smoothly. The Miracle of Morgan's Creek was being written by Sturges at night even as the production was being filmed in the daytime, and Sturges the screenwriter was rarely more than 10 pages ahead of the cast and crew.

Despite the box office success of The Lady Eve and The Miracle of Morgan's Creek, conflict with Paramount's studio bosses increased. In particular, executive producer Buddy DeSylva never really trusted his star writer-director and was wary (and arguably jealous) of the independence Sturges enjoyed on his projects. One of the sources of conflict was that Sturges liked to reuse many of the same character actors in his films, thus creating what amounted to a regular troupe he could call upon within the studio system. Paramount feared that the audience would tire of repeatedly seeing the same faces in Sturges productions. But the director was adamant, saying, "[T]hese little players who had contributed so much to my first hits had a moral right to work in my subsequent pictures." The way Sturges wrote and directed these actors created a succession of what Andrew Sarris later called "self-expressive cameos of aggressive individualism."

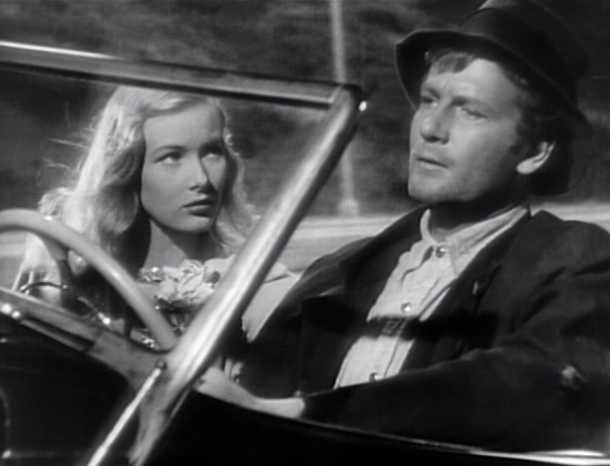
Veronica Lake and Joel McCrea in Sullivan's Travels (1941)

Members of the Preston Sturges Unofficial Stock Company Actors included George Anderson, Al Bridge, Georgia Caine, Chester Conklin, Jimmy Conlin, William Demarest, (Note: Demarest appeared in ten films written by Sturges, eight of which he also directed: Diamond Jim (1935), Easy Living (1937), The Great McGinty (1940), Christmas in July (1940), The Lady Eve (1941), Sullivan's Travels (1941), The Palm Beach Story (1942), The Miracle of Morgan's Creek (1944), Hail the Conquering Hero (1944) and The Great Moment (1944)) Robert Dudley, Byron Foulger, Robert Greig, Harry Hayden, Esther Howard, Arthur Hoyt, J. Farrell MacDonald, George Melford, Torben Meyer, Charles R. Moore, Frank Moran, Jack Norton, Jane Buckingham, Franklin Pangborn, Emory Parnell, Victor Potel, Dewey Robinson, Harry Rosenthal, Julius Tannen, Max Wagner and Robert Warwick. Sturges re-used Sig Arno, Luis Alberni, Eric Blore, Porter Hall and Raymond Walburn and even stars including Joel McCrea and Rudy Vallee, who both made three films with Sturges in addition to Eddie Bracken, who did two.

The prolonged clashes between Sturges and Paramount came to a head as the end of his contract approached. He had filmed The Great Moment and The Miracle of Morgan's Creek in 1942 and Hail the Conquering Hero in 1943, but Paramount was suffering from a surfeit of films. Indeed, some of the studio's finished movies were sold off to United Artists, which needed films to distribute. (Note: This included a film Sturges was involved with as producer, I Married A Witch.) The studio held onto Sturges's three films, since he was their star filmmaker at the time, but did not immediately release them.

Internally, studio heads expressed serious reservations about them, as did the censors at the Breen Office. Sturges managed to get The Miracle of Morgan's Creek released with only minor changes, but The Great Moment and Hail the Conquering Hero were taken out of his control and tinkered with by DeSylva. When the revamped Hail the Conquering Hero had a disastrous preview, Paramount allowed Sturges–who by that time had left the studio–to come back and fix the film. Sturges did some rewriting, shot some new scenes, and re-edited the film back to his original vision, all without pay. He was unable to similarly rescue The Great Moment, however. The historical biography about the dentist who discovered the use of ether for anesthesia ended up being Sturges's only flop during this period. More significantly, it marked the onset of a downturn from which Sturges did not fully recover.

=== Independence and decline ===
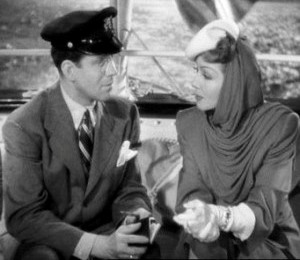
Rudy Vallée and Claudette Colbert in The Palm Beach Story (1942)

The millionaire Howard Hughes, who had formed a friendship with Sturges, offered to bankroll him as an independent filmmaker. In early 1944, Sturges and Hughes formed a partnership called California Pictures. The deal represented a major pay cut for Sturges, but it established him as a writer-producer-director, the only one in Hollywood besides Charles Chaplin and one of only four in the world, along with England's Noël Coward and France's René Clair. The status led, again, to widespread admiration and envy among his Hollywood peers.

However, this career peak also marked the beginning of Sturges's professional decline as Hughes proved an unstable and mercurial partner. While the startup California Pictures was being created and structured, it was three years until Sturges's next release. That film, the Harold Lloyd vehicle The Sin of Harold Diddlebock (1947), for which Sturges had coaxed the silent film star out of retirement, went over budget and far behind schedule, and was poorly received when released. Hughes, who had promised not to interfere in the film's production, stepped in and pulled the movie from distribution in order to re-edit it, taking almost four years to do so. Released in 1950 by RKO, which was by that time owned by Hughes, the retitled Mad Wednesday was no more successful than Sturges's original version.

In the meantime, California Pictures had put another film into production, Vendetta. At Hughes's behest, Sturges had written the script as a vehicle for Hughes' protégé, Faith Domergue. Max Ophüls was hired to direct, but after only a few days of filming, Hughes demanded that Sturges fire Ophüls and take over the direction himself. Seven weeks later, Sturges himself was fired or quit (accounts differ). The promising partnership between the two iconoclasts was dissolved after just one completed picture. As Sturges later recalled, "When Mr. Hughes made suggestions with which I disagreed, as he had a perfect right to do, I rejected them. When I rejected the last one, he remembered he had an option to take control of the company and he took over. So I left."

Coming on the heels of the failure of The Great Moment, these further flops, disappointments and setbacks served to tarnish the once stellar reputation of the golden boy of Hollywood. Sturges was left professionally adrift. Accepting an offer from Darryl Zanuck, he landed at Fox where he wrote, directed, and produced two films. The first, Unfaithfully Yours (1948), was not initially well received by either reviewers or the public, though its critical reputation has since improved. However, his second Fox film, The Beautiful Blonde from Bashful Bend (1949), was the first serious flop in star Betty Grable's career, and Sturges was again on his own. He built a theater at his Players restaurant, but the project did not pan out.

Over the next several years, Sturges continued to write, but many of the projects were underfunded or stillborn, and those that emerged did not approach the same success as his earlier triumphs. His 1951 Broadway musical, Make a Wish, underwent extensive rewriting by Abe Burrows and ran for only a few months. His next Broadway project, Carnival in Flanders, a musical which Sturges wrote and directed in 1953, closed after six performances.

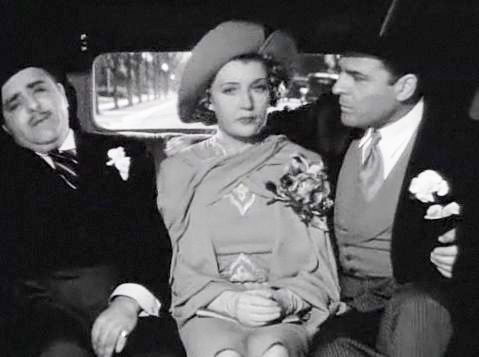
Akim Tamiroff, Muriel Angelus and Brian Donlevy in The Great McGinty (1940)

Sturges was having no better luck in Hollywood, where his clout was gone. Katharine Hepburn, who had starred in the 1952 Broadway production of the George Bernard Shaw's The Millionairess got Sturges to agree to adapt the script and direct. But she could not get a single Hollywood studio to back the project.

A 1953 lien by the Internal Revenue Service, with whom he had been having tax problems, cost Sturges the Players nightclub and other assets. Sturges put a brave public face on the situation, writing, "I had so very much for so very long, it is quite natural for the pendulum to swing the other way for a while, and I really cannot and will not complain." However, his drinking became heavy, and his marriage and many of his relationships continued to deteriorate.

Sturges began spending more time in Europe, as he had as a young man. His last directorial effort took place there when he wrote and directed Les Carnets du Major Thompson, an adaptation of a popular French novel. The film was released in France in 1955 and two years later in the U.S., under the title The French, They Are a Funny Race. It failed to register with critics or audiences.

Sturges made four brief cameo appearances during his career: in his own Christmas in July and Sullivan's Travels; in the Paramount all-star extravaganza Star Spangled Rhythm and, in the years of his decline, in the Bob Hope comedy Paris Holiday, filmed in France and the last film he worked on. Two decades earlier, Sturges had been a writer on one of Hope's earliest film successes, Never Say Die.

In 1959, Sturges summed up his career:

Between flops, it is true, I have come up with an occasional hit, but compared to a good boxer's record, for instance, my percentage has been lamentable. I fought a draw in my first fight, stupified everyone by winning the championship in my second, got a couple of wins with picture rights, then was knocked out three times in a row. Dragging my weary carcass to Hollywood, I was immediately knocked out again, won a big fight some six months later, then marked time for six years as an ordinary ham-and-beaner, picking up what I could. Suddenly I saw a chance and offered to fight for the world championship for a dollar. To everyone's astonishment, I won that championship and defended it successfully for a number of years, winning nine times by knockout, fighting three draws, losing twice and getting one no-decision in Europe. I have just come over to America for a fight, but it was called off at the last moment, one of the promoters having gone nuts and having to have been locked up. Why I'm not walking on my heels after all this, I don't know. Maybe I am walking on my heels. It would be surprising if I weren't.

== Themes ==
According to Todd McCarthy, "A continuing theme of Preston Sturges is that a good front or guise can easily bamboozle the public." McCarthy cites Sturges's screenplay for Diamond Jim (1935). The critic Ephraim Katz wrote that Sturges's films "... parodied with pungent wit various aspects of American life from politics and advertising to sex and hero worship. They were marked by their verbal wit, opportune comic timing, and eccentric, outrageously funny cameo characterizations." Andrew Sarris wrote, "Sturges repeatedly suggested that the lowliest boob could rise to the top with the right degree of luck, bluff, and fraud."

In 1942, in his review of The Palm Beach Story, critic Manny Farber wrote:

He is essentially a satirist without any stable point of view from which to aim his satire. He is apt to turn his back on what he has been sniping at to demolish what he has just been defending. He is contemptuous of everybody except the opportunist and the unscrupulous little woman who, at some point in every picture, labels the hero a poor sap. That the invariable fairy godfather of each picture is not only expressive of his own cold-blooded cynicism but of typical Hollywood fantasy is an example of how this works. Another phase of his attack is shrouding in slapstick the fact that the godfather pays off not for perseverance or honesty or ability but merely from capriciousness.

Anthony Lane writes that

his films are peopled, to an alarming degree, by families that don't add up, and by couples who click together and them come apart like toys. The hero of The Great McGinty marries his secretary (who already has children of her own) purely because, as an aspirant political thug, he needs a mate. Most startling is The Palm Beach Story, in which Claudette Colbert runs out on her husband (Joel McCrea) even though her toes go all funny whenever he kisses her; she simply needs more money in her life, and that means somebody else. The movie starts and ends with the curlicued words "And they all lived happily ever" after filling the screen, followed at once by the jaunty rider "Or did they?" At no point in a Sturges comedy does a happy family sit around being a happy family; you could read that as a psychotic reaction to his own precarious parentage, but I prefer to think that Sturges was so taken by the drama of his origins that he chose to milk it dry.

James Agee called Sturges's films "uncontrollably, almost proudly corrupt, vengeful, fearful of intactness and self-commitment ... their mastering object, aside from success, seems to be to sail as deep into the wind as possible without for an instant incurring the disaster of becoming seriously wholly acceptable as art. They seem to be, indeed, in much of their twisting, the elaborately counterpointed image of a neurosis.

== Style and influence ==
Sturges spoke his scripts aloud, playing all the parts, which were transcribed, rather than he, himself, writing them out.

Sturges took the screwball comedy format of the 1930s to another level, writing dialogue that, heard today, is often surprisingly naturalistic, mature, and ahead of its time, despite the farcical situations. It is not uncommon for a Sturges character to deliver an exquisitely turned phrase and take an elaborate pratfall within the same scene. Such versatility and dexterity can be seen in The Lady Eve, where a tender love scene takes place between Henry Fonda and Barbara Stanwyck, which is enlivened by a horse as it repeatedly pokes its nose into Fonda's head. Critic Andrew Dickos wrote that "the touchstone of Preston Sturges' screenwriting lies in the respect paid to the play and density of verbal language" and "establishes the standard of eloquence as one of poetry, of a cacophony of Euro-American vernacularisms and utterances, peculiarly—and appropriately—spoken with scandalous indifference."

His scripts were almost congenitally unable to deliver a single mood. In Hail the Conquering Hero, the series of lies, crimes, and embarrassments all somehow bolster the film's theme of patriotism and duty. Sometimes this attitude could be conveyed in a single line of dialogue, such as in The Lady Eve when Jean Harrington (Stanwyck) vows revenge on Charles Pike (Fonda), declaring, "I need him like the axe needs the turkey."

In recent years, film scholars such as Alessandro Pirolini have argued that Sturges's cinema anticipated more experimental narratives by contemporary directors such as Joel and Ethan Coen, Robert Zemeckis and Woody Allen, along with prolific The Simpsons writer John Swartzwelder: "Many of [Sturges's] movies and screenplays reveal a restless and impatient attempt to escape codified rules and narrative schemata, and to push the mechanisms and conventions of their genre to the extent of unveiling them to the spectator. See for example the disruption of standardized timelines in films such as The Power and the Glory and The Great McGinty or the way an apparently classical comedy like Unfaithfully Yours (1948) shifts into the realm of multiple and hypothetical narratives."

Filmmakers who have acknowledged Sturges as an influence include the Coen brothers, Wes Anderson, James Mangold, John Hughes, Peter Bogdanovich, Robert Downey Sr. and John Lasseter.

The Lady Eve, Sullivan's Travels, The Palm Beach Story and The Miracle of Morgan's Creek—were included on AFI's 100 Years ... 100 Laughs list.

Per Preston Sturges: The Rise and Fall of an American Dreamer:

he opened the gates for generations of future filmmakers by becoming the first screenwriter to establish himself as a film director. In the process, he made himself one of the most celebrated figures of the 1940s. But his star, which had burned so brightly, fell almost as quickly as it had risen. To this day, this man who introduced irony to American screen comedy remains an enigmatic and contradictory personality: a lowbrow aristocrat and a melancholy wiseguy, he reaped the rewards and paid the price for being a brilliant American dreamer.

== Personal life ==
Sturges married four times and had three sons:

- Estelle deWolfe Mudge – married in December 1923, separated in 1927, divorced in 1928
- Eleanor Close Hutton (a daughter of Marjorie Merriweather Post) – eloped on April 12, 1930, marriage annulled on April 12, 1932
- Louise Sargent Tevis – married on November 7, 1938, in Reno, Nevada, separated in April 1946, divorced in November 1947
  - son Solomon Sturges IV (b. June 25, 1941) – actor
- Anne Margaret "Sandy" Nagle (a lawyer and former actress) – married on April 15, 1951, marriage ended in 1959 with Sturges's death, mother of his two younger sons
  - Preston Sturges Jr. (b. February 22, 1953) – screenwriter
  - Thomas Preston Sturges (b. June 22, 1956) – music executive

== Death ==
Sturges died of a heart attack at the Algonquin Hotel in Manhattan, New York, while writing his autobiography (which, aptly, he had intended to title The Events Leading Up to My Death), and was interred in the Ferncliff Cemetery in Hartsdale, New York. His book remained unpublished till 1990, when it was issued under the title Preston Sturges by Preston Sturges: His Life in His Words. In 1975, he became the first writer to be given the Screen Writers Guild's Laurel Award posthumously. He has a star dedicated to him on the Hollywood Walk of Fame, at 1601 Vine Street.

== Filmography ==
=== Films, as writer-director ===
| Year | Title |
|---|---|
| 1940 | The Great McGinty |
| 1940 | Christmas in July |
| 1941 | The Lady Eve |
| 1941 | Sullivan's Travels |
| 1942 | The Palm Beach Story |
| 1944 | The Miracle of Morgan's Creek |
| 1944 | Hail the Conquering Hero |
| 1944 | The Great Moment |
| 1947 | The Sin of Harold Diddlebock |
| 1948 | Unfaithfully Yours |
| 1949 | The Beautiful Blonde from Bashful Bend |
| 1955 | The French, They Are a Funny Race |

=== Other film work ===
- The Big Pond (1930; dialogue)
- Fast and Loose (1930; additional dialogue)
- The Invisible Man (1933; contributing writer)
- The Power and the Glory (1933; screenplay, dialogue director)
- Imitation of Life (1934; contributing writer)
- We Live Again (1934; co-screen adaptation)
- Thirty Day Princess (1934; co-screenplay)
- The Good Fairy (1935; screenplay)
- Diamond Jim (1935; screenplay)
- Love Before Breakfast (1936; contributor to treatment)
- Next Time We Love (1936; contributor to screenplay construction)
- Easy Living (1937; screenplay)
- Hotel Haywire (1937; original story, screenplay)
- If I Were King (1938; screenplay)
- Port of Seven Seas (1938; screenplay)
- College Swing (1938; contributing writer)
- Never Say Die (1939; co-screenplay)
- Remember the Night (1940; screenplay)
- I Married a Witch (1942; producer)
- Vendetta (1950; uncredited director)
- The Birds and the Bees (1956, co-screenplay)

=== Actor ===
- Christmas in July (1940) - Man at Shoeshine Stand (uncredited)
- Sullivan's Travels (1941) - Studio Director (uncredited)
- Star Spangled Rhythm (1942) - Himself
- Paris Holiday (1958) - Serge Vitry (final film role)

== Adaptations ==
- Three of Sturges's films, Christmas in July, The Great McGinty and Remember the Night, were restaged for NBC's Lux Video Theater.
- The 1956 George Gobel movie The Birds and the Bees was a remake of The Lady Eve. Paul Jones produced both movies.
- The 1958 Jerry Lewis vehicle Rock-A-Bye Baby was loosely based on Sturges's The Miracle of Morgan's Creek.
- The 1984 Dudley Moore feature Unfaithfully Yours was a remake of Sturges's 1948 original.

== Published screenplays ==
- Five Screenplays (ISBN 0-520-05564-0) collects The Great McGinty, Christmas in July, The Lady Eve, Sullivan's Travels, and Hail the Conquering Hero
- Four More Screenplays (ISBN 0-520-20365-8) collects The Miracle of Morgan's Creek, The Palm Beach Story, Unfaithfully Yours, and The Great Moment
- Three More Screenplays (ISBN 0-520-21004-2) collects The Power and the Glory, Remember the Night, and Easy Living
- O Brother, What Might Have Been – Three Lost Screenplays (ISBN 979-8-89976-017-4) collects Song of Joy, Nothing Doing, and The Millionairess

== See also ==
- List of actors who frequently worked with Preston Sturges
