= Unfaithfully Yours (1948 film) =

1948 film by Preston Sturges

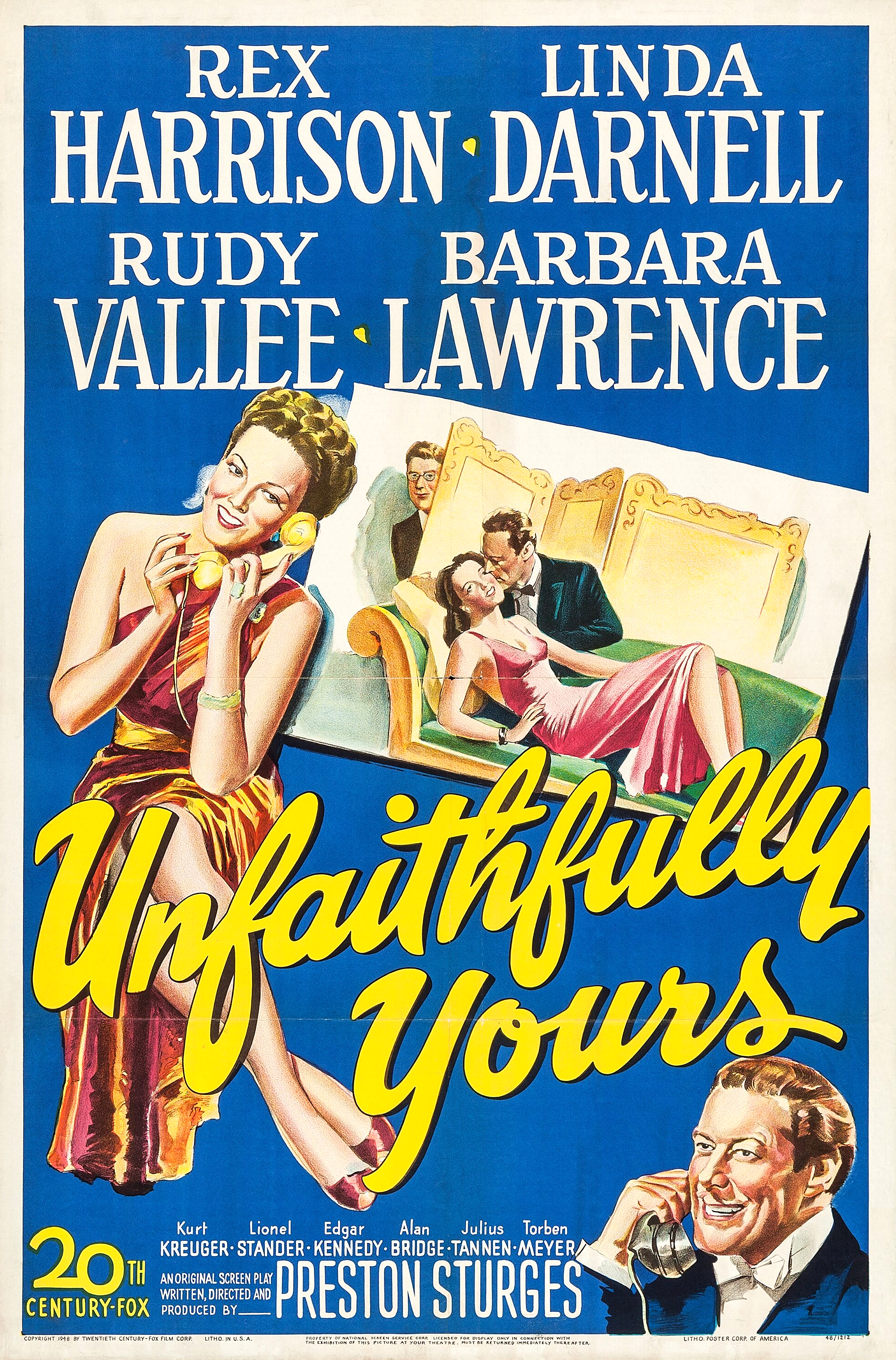
- Theatrical release poster
- Directed by: Preston Sturges
- Written by: Preston Sturges
- Produced by: Preston Sturges
- Starring: Rex Harrison; Linda Darnell; Rudy Vallée; Barbara Lawrence; Kurt Kreuger; Lionel Stander; Edgar Kennedy; Alan Bridge; Julius Tannen; Torben Meyer
- Cinematography: Victor Milner
- Edited by: Robert Fritch
- Music by: Alfred Newman (musical director)
- Production company: Twentieth Century-Fox
- Distributed by: Twentieth Century-Fox
- Release dates: November 5, 1948 (New York City); December 12, 1948 (United States)
- Running time: 105 minutes
- Country: United States
- Language: English
- Budget: $2 million

Unfaithfully Yours is a 1948 American screwball black comedy film produced, written, and directed by Preston Sturges, and starring Rex Harrison, Linda Darnell, Rudy Vallée, and Barbara Lawrence. The film is about a jealous symphony conductor who imagines three different ways to deal with the supposed infidelity of his beautiful wife—murder, forbearance, and a suicidal game of Russian roulette—during a concert of three inspiring pieces of classical music. At home, his attempts to bring any of his fantasies to life swiftly devolve into farce, underscored with humorous adaptations of the relevant music.

Although the film, which was the first of two Sturges made for Twentieth Century-Fox, received mostly positive reviews, it was not successful at the box office.

== Plot ==
World-famous symphony conductor Sir Alfred de Carter returns from a visit to his native England and discovers that his rich brother-in-law, August Henshler, having misunderstood Alfred's casual instruction to watch over his much younger wife Daphne while he was away, hired a private detective named Sweeney to follow her. Alfred is livid, and when August hands him the detective's report, he tears it to pieces without reading it and throws August out of his hotel room. Later, when the hotel's house detective returns the torn-up report to Alfred, he burns it and accidentally sets his dressing room on fire, causing him to be late for lunch with Daphne.

At the restaurant, Alfred encounters August and his wife, Daphne's sister Barbara, and is unnerved when they remark that Daphne and Anthony "Tony" Windborn, Alfred's secretary who is closer to her own age, looked too "cute" sitting together to be disturbed. Alfred briefly joins Daphne and Tony before he obtains Sweeney's address from August and leaves for the detective's office, ostensibly so he can destroy any copies of the report. Sweeney, a fan of Arthur's music, summarizes the report for him: late one night, Daphne went to another room in the hotel in her negligee and stayed there for 38 minutes. Alfred goes to the hotel room listed in the report and is stunned to find Tony there.

Distressed, Alfred quarrels with Daphne before proceeding to his concert, where he conducts three pieces of classical music, envisioning scenarios appropriate to each one: a "perfect crime" scenario in which he murders his wife with a straight razor and frames Tony (to the overture to Rossini's Semiramide), accepting the situation and giving Daphne a generous check and his blessing (to the prelude to Wagner's Tannhäuser), and a game of Russian roulette with a blubbering Daphne and Tony, that ends in Alfred's death with the first trigger pull (to Tchaikovsky's Francesca da Rimini).

After the concert, Alfred tries to stage his murder fantasy, but makes a mess of their apartment while looking for the recording device which he fantasized using to lure Tony to the crime scene, then accidentally records at the wrong speed. Daphne returns home and questions her husband about his ill temperament, but devotedly bandages his thumb when he cuts it testing the sharpness of his razor. He then tries the forgiveness fantasy, but spills ink all over his checkbook. Russian roulette also fizzles out when he cannot remember where he left the bullets.

Without revealing his suspicions, Alfred asks if Daphne has ever been to Tony's room. She admits it, saying she was searching for Barbara, suspecting she was having an affair with Tony; she became trapped there when she saw Sweeney spying on the room, fearful that if he saw her walk out she would be suspected of having an affair. Alfred begs Daphne's forgiveness for his irrational behavior, which she gladly gives, ascribing it to the creative temperament of a great artist.

== Cast ==
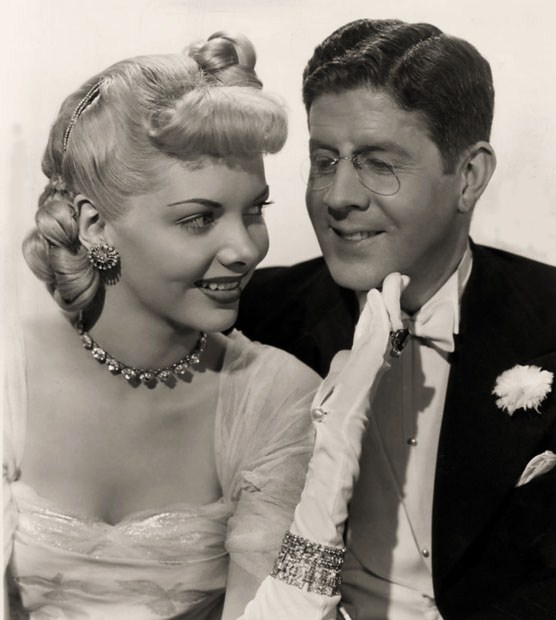
Publicity still with Barbara Lawrence and Rudy Vallée

- Rex Harrison as Sir Alfred de Carter
- Linda Darnell as Daphne de Carter
- Rudy Vallée as August Henshler
- Barbara Lawrence as Barbara Henshler
- Kurt Kreuger as Anthony Windborn
- Lionel Stander as Hugo Standoff
- Edgar Kennedy as Detective Sweeney
- Alan Bridge as house detective
- Julius Tannen as O'Brien
- Torben Meyer as Dr. Schultz
- Georgia Caine as Dowager (uncredited)
- Robert Greig as Jules, the valet (uncredited)
- Max Wagner as stage manager (uncredited)

== Music ==
Each of Alfred's three fantasy revenge scenarios is accompanied by music appropriate for the mood of the particular scene, which is underscored throughout. Rex Harrison is shown rehearsing and directing real musicians from known orchestras.

- Overture to the opera Semiramide by Gioacchino Rossini, about a femme fatale as Alfred envisages his wife to be.
- Overture to the opera Tannhäuser und der Sängerkrieg auf Wartburg by Richard Wagner, about renunciation of carnal love for a higher and more spiritual goal, as Alfred sees himself in that situation.
- The tone poem Francesca da Rimini by Peter Ilyich Tchaikovsky, referring to the infernal destiny awaiting an adulterous wife, such as Dante's character.

== Production ==
Preston Sturges wrote the original screen story for Unfaithfully Yours in 1932—the idea came to him when a melancholy song on the radio influenced him while working on writing a comic scene. Sturges shopped the script to Fox, Universal and Paramount who all rejected it during the 1930s.

In 1938, Sturges envisioned Ronald Colman playing de Carter, and later initially wanted Frances Ramsden—who was introduced in Sturges' 1947 film The Sin of Harold Diddlebock—to play Daphne; but by the time casting for the film began, he wanted James Mason for the conductor and Gene Tierney for his wife. Jimmy Conlin, one of Sturges' regular actors, played the role of Daphne's father, but the character was cut before the film was released.

Studio attorneys were worried about the similarity between Sturges' character Sir Alfred de Carter, a famous English conductor, and the real-life famous English conductor Sir Thomas Beecham; they warned Sturges to tone down the parallels, but the similarity was noted in some reviews anyway. (Beecham's grandfather was Thomas Beecham, a chemist who invented Beecham's Pills, a laxative. It is speculated that Sturges named his character de Carter after Carter's Little Liver Pills.)

Unfaithfully Yours, which had the working titles of Unfinished Symphony and The Symphony Story, went into production on February 18, 1948, and wrapped in mid-April of that year. By June 28, the film had already been sneak-previewed, with a runtime of 127 minutes, but the film's release was delayed to avoid any backlash from the suicide of actress Carole Landis in July. It was rumored that Landis and Rex Harrison had been having an affair, and that she committed suicide when Harrison refused to get a divorce and marry her. Harrison discovered Landis' body in her home.

The film premiered in New York City on November 5, 1948, and went into general release on December 10. The Los Angeles premiere was on December 14.

In February 1949, after the film was released, William D. Shapiro, who claimed to be an independent film producer, sued Fox and Sturges with a claim that the story of the film was plagiarized from an unproduced screen story by Arthur Hoerl, which Shapiro had been intending to produce. The connection was supposedly composer Werner Heymann, who frequently worked with Sturges and whom Shapiro had interviewed to be the music director on his film.

== Reception ==
Reviewing the film for The New York Times, Bosley Crowther remarked that "for all its occasional slow stretches and its fleeting delays on the punch, Unfaithfully Yours is a dilly of a sardonic slapstick comedy." He lauded the film for having great wit, a satirical moral, strong performances by Rex Harrison and Linda Darnell, and the unique authorial touch of Preston Sturges.

Variety listed the film as a box office disappointment. Some film historians have suggested that the scandal surrounding the suicide of Harrison's lover Carole Landis may have been a factor in the disappointing ticket sales.

The film remains well-regarded by critics. On the review aggregator website Rotten Tomatoes, the film holds an approval rating of 100% based on 17 reviews, with an average rating of 8.5/10. In a retrospective review for The New Yorker, Pauline Kael called it "One of the most sophisticated slapstick comedies ever made", noting its outstanding and influential comic lines and scenarios.

In 2022, director Quentin Tarantino placed Unfaithfully Yours at number 9 on his list of favorite 11 films of all time.

== Home media ==
The Criterion Company released a DVD of the film, featuring additional audio commentary by Sturges scholars James Harvey, Diane Jacobs, and Brian Henderson. Sturges's fourth (and last) wife "Sandy" also provides commentary about Sturges and the film.

== Remake ==
20th Century Fox remade the film in 1984 under the same title, directed by Howard Zieff and starring Dudley Moore, Nastassja Kinski, Armand Assante, and Albert Brooks. The remake, however, eliminated the theme of three different pieces of music inspiring three different response or revenge scenarios.
