= The Sin of Harold Diddlebock =

1947 film by Preston Sturges

- Original theatrical poster
- Directed by: Preston Sturges
- Written by: Preston Sturges
- Produced by: Preston Sturges; Howard Hughes (both uncredited)
- Starring: Harold Lloyd
- Cinematography: Robert Pittack; Curt Courant (uncredited)
- Edited by: Thomas Neff
- Music by: Werner R. Heymann; Harry Rosenthal (uncredited)
- Distributed by: United Artists
- Release dates: February 18, 1947 (Miami); April 4, 1947 (U.S.); October 28, 1950 (re-release)
- Running time: 89 minutes 76 minutes (Note: Mad Wednesday version) (1950)
- Country: United States
- Language: English
- Budget: $1,712,959 (est.) or $2.4 million

The Sin of Harold Diddlebock is a 1947 American comedy film written and directed by Preston Sturges, starring the silent film comic icon Harold Lloyd (in his final film appearance), and featuring a supporting cast including female protagonist Frances Ramsden, Jimmy Conlin, Raymond Walburn, Rudy Vallee, Arline Judge, Edgar Kennedy, Franklin Pangborn, J. Farrell MacDonald, Robert Dudley, Robert Greig, Lionel Stander and Jackie the Lion. The film's story is a continuation of The Freshman (1925), one of Lloyd's most successful movies.

The Sin of Harold Diddlebock was Sturges' first project after leaving Paramount Pictures, where he had made his most popular films, but the film was not successful in its initial release. It was quickly pulled from distribution by producer Howard Hughes who took almost four years to re-shoot some scenes and re-edit the film, finally re-releasing it in 1950 as Mad Wednesday – but the reception by the general public was no better the second time around. Lloyd was never to star in another film, turning instead to production, and releasing compilation films featuring his earlier silent film work, making this his last film.

== Plot ==
In 1923, Tate College freshman Harold Diddlebock is brought into his college's football team where he scores the winning touchdown. The mild-mannered Harold is quickly offered a job by the pompous advertising tycoon J.E. Waggleberry. Although Harold dreams of becoming an "ideas man", Waggleberry assigns him to a lowly position in the bookkeeping department.

In 1945, the now middle-aged Harold is let go by Waggleberry for old age and not being an ideas-man. He is given an 18 karat Swiss watch and a severance check for $2,946.12, the remains of his company investment plan. He bids farewell to Miss Otis, a young woman who works at an artist's desk down the aisle, giving her the paid-for engagement ring that he had, having planned to marry each of her six older sisters (Hortense, Irma, Harriet, Margie, Claire, and Rosemary) when they had worked there before her. He wanders out, aimlessly through the streets, his life's savings in his trouser pocket.

Harold is approached by Wormy, a local con artist, petty gambler, and racetrack tout, who asks Harold for some money so he can place a bet. Seeing the large amount of cash that Harold has, and hoping to get him drunk enough to acquire some of the cash, Wormy takes Harold to a local bar for a drink. When Harold tells the bartender, Jake, that he has never had a drink in his life, the barkeep creates a potent cocktail he calls "The Diddlebock". The effects of the alcohol causes Harold to yowl uncontrollably. Gazing at himself in the bar mirror, Harold suddenly declares himself a loser and races out to remake himself. Soon Harold is getting his hair cut and his nails manicured at a local tailor shop and salon, and is trying on a gaudy plaid suit supplied by tailor Formfit Franklin. In the midst of his transformation, Harold overhears Wormy talking with his bookie Max, and impulsively bets $1,000 of his money on a 15-to-one long shot horse named Emmaline. To everyone's surprise, Emmaline wins, and the now-rich Harold celebrates all around town on a day-and-a-half binge of spending, gambling, and carousing.

Days later, Harold wakes up on the sofa inside the house of his widowed sister Flora. She chastises him for his behavior. He is hungover, and finds he has a garish new wardrobe and a ten-gallon cowboy hat. Unable to remember much about his drunken binge, Harold goes to return the plaid suit and is surprised to learn that he now owns a horse-drawn cab, complete with an English driver named Thomas. A worried Wormy then rushes up and informs Harold that, with winnings from a second bet, Harold also bought a bankrupt circus. Seeing no future with the ownership of the circus, Harold gets the idea to sell the circus to a Wall Street banker.

Harold and Wormy visit the circus-loving Wall Street banker Lynn Sargent, but he turns them down because he is trying to unload his own bankrupt circus. When the rest of the town's bankers follow suit, Harold comes up with an idea. To get past the bank guards, Harold dresses up in his plaid suit and brings along Jackie, a tame circus lion, who incites panic. Carrying a filled Thermos, Wormy gives shot drinks of the potent "Diddlebock" cocktail to each of the bankers they visit so their inhibitions will fade and convince them to put in bids for ownership of the circus.

Harold, Wormy, and Jackie the Lion are arrested and thrown in jail. Miss Otis bails them out the following day. They find that the publicity has attracted a mob of bankers at the jail who want to buy the circus – but Ringling Brothers outbids them. Harold celebrates with another "Diddlebock", and again has another relapse. Harold wakes up days later in the horse-drawn cab with Miss Otis, where he learns that he received $175,000 for the sale of the circus, he is now an executive at Waggleberry's advertising agency, and that he and Miss Otis are married. Reassuring Harold that she truly loves him, Miss Otis gives him a big kiss.

== Cast ==
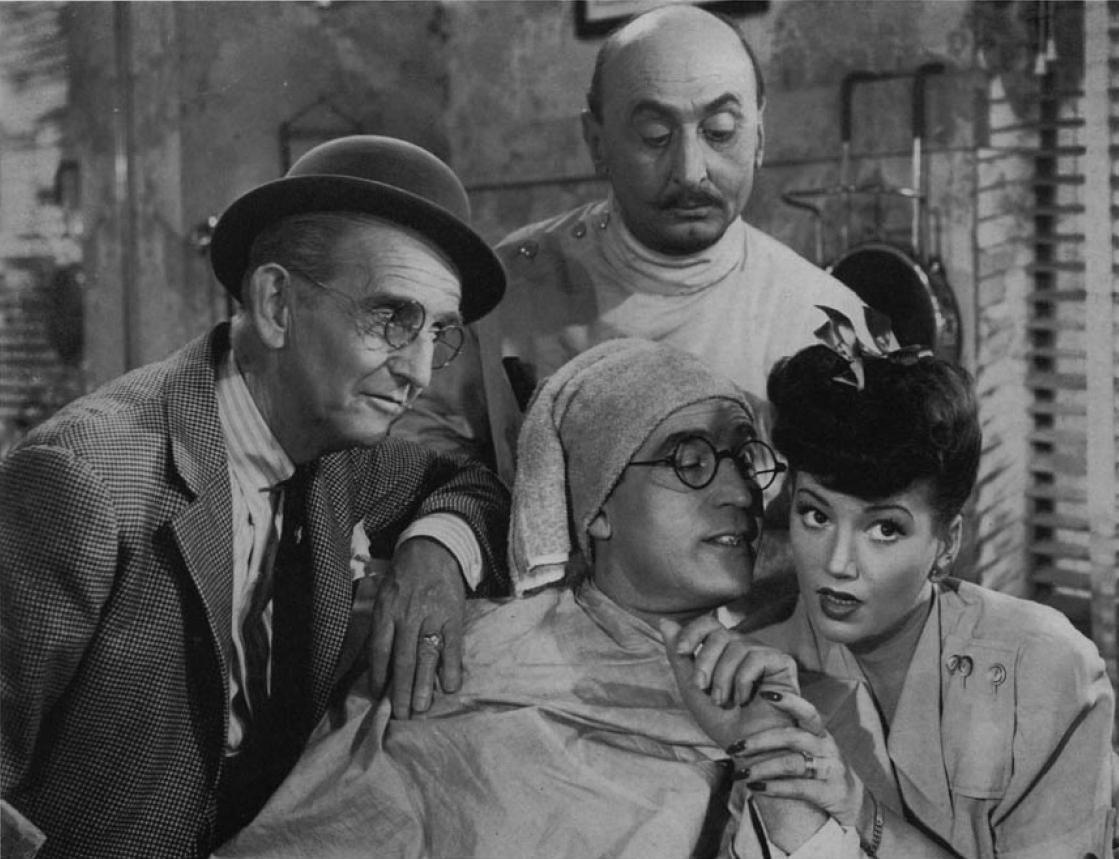
Jimmy Conlin, Harold Lloyd, Torben Meyer, and Arline Judge in the film

- Harold Lloyd as Harold Diddlebock
- Jimmy Conlin as Wormy
- Raymond Walburn as E. J. Waggleberry
- Frances Ramsden as Miss Otis
- Rudy Vallee as Lynn Sargent
- Edgar Kennedy as Jake, the bartender
- Arline Judge as Manicurist
- Franklin Pangborn as Formfit Franklin
- Lionel Stander as Max
- Margaret Hamilton as Flora
- Jack Norton as James R. Smoke
- Robert Dudley as Robert McDuffy'
- Arthur Hoyt as J. P. Blackstone
- Julius Tannen as Nearsighted Banker
- Al Bridge as Wild Bill Hickok
- Robert Greig as Algernon McNiff
- Georgia Caine as Bearded lady
- Victor Potel as Professor Potelle
- Torben Meyer as Barber with Mustache
- Pinto Colvig as the voice of the talking horse (uncredited, Mad Wednesday only)

== Production ==
After writer-director Preston Sturges left Paramount Pictures in 1944, he and Howard Hughes formed California Pictures. In July of that year it was reported that Sturges had tempted one of his idols, Harold Lloyd, out of retirement to become a producer-director at the new studio. His first project was to be "The Sin of Hilda Diddlebock", a story written by Sturges about a girl's adventures in Hollywood. Their second project was to be a film called "The Wizard of Whispering Falls" (Lloyd had not appeared on film since 1938's Professor Beware). Even after Lloyd became the lead character, he was promised by Sturges that he could direct part of the film, but this never happened. Although the project began as a labor of love between Sturges and Lloyd, the two had a disagreement over creative differences, which affected the quality of the finished film.

Re-release theatrical poster

The Sin of Harold Diddlebock went into production on 12 September 1945. California Pictures was a new company and lacked adequate facilities to make the film, so Sturges attempted to buy Sherman Studios. When he failed, production of The Sin of Harold Diddlebock took place at Goldwyn Studios, with additional shooting – including the window ledge scene which recalled a well-known similar scene from Lloyd's Safety Last (1923) – at Paramount. Some location shooting (for the hansom cab scenes) took place on Riverside Drive in Los Angeles. When the film wrapped on 29 January 1946, the production ran $600,000 over budget.

The film premiered in Miami, Florida on 8 February 1947, and went into general release on 4 April. Despite Sturges' later claim that the film "got the best reviews I ever received," the notices were mixed and commented on the unevenness of the comedy, perhaps the result of the dispute between Sturges and Lloyd. Sturges claimed that producer Howard Hughes used the reviews as an excuse to re-make the film.

In May, it was reported that Hughes was running a contest for his employees to find a shorter name for the film, with the winner to get $250. The next month, after it had only played in three cities, the film was pulled from circulation and its name changed to Mad Wednesday, because of concerns that the word "sin" in the title would hold back the film's box office from the "family trade". It was intended to resume film distribution as soon as October, and a special effects crew was sent to San Francisco to film process shots to be used in the film's re-editing.

Because of Hughes' re-editing of the film and re-shooting of some scenes – Sturges said that Hughes "[left] out all the parts I considered the best in the picture, and adding to its end a talking horse" – the film was not ready for re-release until 1950. United Artists backed out of their distribution deal with Hughes, so after Hughes bought RKO, he used his new studio to release the film, now cut from 89 to 76 minutes on 28 October 1950. The total cost of the film was estimated to be $1,712,959.

After Howard Hughes re-edited the film, Rudy Vallee's part was almost entirely cut out. He did not receive screen credit on the re-released film, Mad Wednesday, nor did Georgia Caine. Lloyd's billing was moved from above the title to below, provoking Lloyd to file a $750,000 lawsuit in 1953 against RKO and California Pictures, claiming breach of contract.

Both versions of the film, as originally released and as altered by Hughes, still exist. The original 1947 release of The Sin of Harold Diddlebock is in the public domain in the United States, due to the lapse of the original copyright; however the re-edited 1950 version, Mad Wednesday is still under copyright. According to All Movie Guide's Hal Erikson, the shorter version plays better for audiences, while the original is richer in its comic invention and characterizations.

== Awards and honors ==
In 1951, Harold Lloyd received a Golden Globe nomination as "Best Motion Picture Actor - Musical/Comedy", and the film was nominated for Grand Prize at the 1951 Cannes Film Festival.

== Preservation ==
The Sin of Harold Diddlebock was preserved and restored by the UCLA Film & Television Archive from a 35mm acetate composite fine grain and 16mm composite print. Restoration funding provided by the Century Arts Foundation and The Packard Humanities Institute. The restoration premiered at the UCLA Festival of Preservation in 2022.

== See also ==
- Harold Lloyd filmography
