= Easy Living (1937 film) =

1937 film by Mitchell Leisen

- Film poster
- Directed by: Mitchell Leisen
- Screenplay by: Preston Sturges
- Story by: Vera Caspary
- Produced by: Arthur Hornblow Jr.
- Starring: Jean Arthur; Edward Arnold; Ray Milland
- Cinematography: Ted Tetzlaff
- Edited by: Doane Harrison
- Music by: Boris Morros
- Color process: Black and white
- Production company: Paramount Pictures
- Distributed by: Paramount Pictures
- Release dates: July 7, 1937 (New York City); July 16, 1937 (USA)
- Running time: 88 minutes
- Country: United States
- Language: English

Easy Living is a 1937 American screwball comedy film, directed by Mitchell Leisen, written by Preston Sturges from a story by Vera Caspary, and starring Jean Arthur, Edward Arnold, and Ray Milland. Many of the supporting players (William Demarest, Franklin Pangborn, Luis Alberni, Robert Greig, Olaf Hytten, and Arthur Hoyt) became part of Sturges's regular stock company of character actors in his subsequent films.

Ralph Rainger and Leo Robin composed the song "Easy Living" for the film, and it has since become a jazz standard, made famous by Billie Holiday, Ella Fitzgerald, and many other jazz singers.

The film bears no relation to the 1949 RKO drama by the same name.

== Plot ==
J.B. Ball, the third richest banker in America, has a fight with his son John Jr. over breakfast. It ends with the son leaving, determined to prove that he can make his own way. Ball becomes infuriated after learning that his wife Jenny bought a $58,000 sable fur coat ($1.3M in 2025) and he decides it has to be returned. After finding many fur coats in her closet, Ball grabs the sable coat. Jenny takes it from him, and a chase takes them to the roof of their New York City penthouse. He throws it over the edge.

It lands on Mary Smith while she is riding to work on a double-decker bus. When she tries to return it, he tells her to keep it, without telling her how costly it is. He also buys her an expensive new hat to replace the one damaged in the incident, causing Van Buren, the owner of the shop, to mistake her for Ball's mistress. Van Buren loses no time in spreading the word. When Mary shows up for work, her straitlaced boss suspects her of behaving improperly to get a coat she obviously cannot afford and fires her to protect the reputation of the Boy's Constant Companion, the magazine he publishes.

Mary is nearly penniless, but she begins receiving offers from people eager to cash in on her notoriety. Hotel owner Mr. Louis Louis installs her in a luxury suite, hoping that this will deter Ball from foreclosing on his failing establishment. When Mary goes to an automat for a meal, she meets John Jr., who is working there anonymously. However, he is fired for giving Mary free food and starting a food fight. When Mary finds out he has no place to stay, she invites him to share her enormous suite while he looks for a new job. They quickly fall in love. Meanwhile, J.B.'s wife goes to Florida, he moves into the Hotel Louis, and reports of a nonexistent affair make their way into gossip columns. The hotel instantly becomes popular with the elite, and various luxury firms begin giving Mary jewelry, clothes, and a sixteen-cylinder car.

Mary's supposed connection to J.B. has disastrous consequences for the stock market. Stockbroker E.F. Hulgar asks her for inside information about steel from Mr. Ball. The only Ball the confused Mary knows is John Jr., so she consults him. He jokingly tells her it is going down, and she passes this along to Hulgar. As a result, everybody begins selling just as J.B. starts buying, causing his firm to teeter on the brink of bankruptcy. Jenny returns from Florida. When Mary, John, and J.B. finally get together and figure out what is going on, John comes up with a bright solution: Mary tells Hulgar that J.B. has cornered the market on steel. Prices shoot up, rescuing the beleaguered financier. The delighted J.B. gives his son a job, and John Jr. asks Mary to be his wife.

== Cast ==
- Jean Arthur as Mary Smith
- Edward Arnold as J.B. Ball
- Ray Milland as John Ball Jr.
- Luis Alberni as Mr. Louis Louis
- Mary Nash as Mrs. (Jenny) Ball
- Franklin Pangborn as Van Buren (the hat shop proprietor who starts the misunderstanding)
- Barlowe Borland as Mr. Gurney
- William Demarest as Wallace Whistling (the gossip columnist who makes Mary famous)
- Andrew Tombes as E.F. Hulgar
- Esther Dale as Lillian (J.B.'s secretary)
- Harlan Briggs as Office Manager
- William B. Davidson as Mr. Hyde
- Nora Cecil as Miss Swerf
- George Cowl as Bank President
- Robert Greig as Butler (Graves, J.B. Ball's butler)
- Robert Homans as Private Guard (uncredited)
- Olaf Hytten as Houseman (uncredited)

Cast notes:

- Jean Arthur and Edward Arnold starred together in 1935's Diamond Jim, also written by Sturges.
- This was the second film written by Preston Sturges that William Demarest appeared in, after Diamond Jim, and he would go on to do eight others.
- Franklin Pangborn, another member of Sturges' de facto stock company, first worked with the writer on Imitation of Life (1934). In 1937, before working on Easy Living, he appeared in Hotel Haywire, and subsequently in seven other of Sturges' productions.

== Production ==
Preston Sturges had signed a deal with Paramount in 1936, and Easy Living was his first script writing assignment for them.

"the original story, by the Hollywood leftist Vera Caspary, had Mary steal the coat" - J. Hoberman, The New York Times

Although putatively based on a story by Vera Caspary, Sturges in fact supposedly kept almost nothing of it except the fur coat. When a studio executive rejected the script because "1936 was not the time for comedies", Sturges took the script directly to Mitchell Leisen, of which Sturges said "going to a director over the head of my producer was not a sagacious move".

Preston based the Hotel Louis on the Waldorf Towers, which was a financial flop when it first opened.

Adolphe Menjou was to have been in the cast of Easy Living, but was forced to withdraw due to illness. The minor surgery of director Leisen caused production to be postponed a week to April 5, 1937.

Leisen said that Ray Milland got stuck in the tub while shooting the bathtub scene, and although the incident wasn't in the script, Leisen kept the camera rolling and inserted the bit into the film. The phone gag with Esther Dale as the secretary was based on the behavior of Leisen's secretary, who got the phones on her desk mixed up.

Under the belief that an actress needs to be satisfied with the way she will look in order to devote all her attention to her acting, Leisen personally directed all of Arthur's wardrobe and hair tests, and went so far as to style her hair himself. (Leisen had come to directing from the world of costume design and art direction).

Leisen's pains paid off – the shy and nervous Jean Arthur had a reputation for being difficult, but the director had no trouble with her on Easy Living, which was all the more surprising since Arthur was in the middle of a bitter dispute with Columbia Pictures' Harry Cohn. Dissatisfied with the films Columbia was putting her in, she wanted out of her contract. (Arthur was contractually able to do two outside pictures a year, which is why she could do Easy Living for Paramount).

It has been reported in Jean Arthur's biography and elsewhere (iMdb, and Bob Dorian on American Movie Classics a few years ago) that the jewels and furs Arthur wore in the film were genuine, and that guards were posted during the filming.

A legal dispute between Twentieth-Century Fox and Paramount over the source for the film threatened to hold up its release. Fox asserted that the film was based on a Hungarian play called Der Komet by Attila Orbok, which they owned and had used as the basis for My Lips Betray (1933) and were planning to use as the basis for an upcoming Sonja Henie film, Thin Ice. Fox eventually backed off their claim of infringement, and Easy Living was released as scheduled on July 7, 1937.

== Reception ==
Variety called Easy Living a "poor imitation [of My Man Godfrey]", adding that "[unlike the latter, this one lacks] spontaneity and cleverness", and that the fault lay in the screenplay, which was described as "a trivia of nonsense." The reviewer predicted that the film would initially attract an audience based on the popularity of Jean Arthur, and that it would "open big and then fall off when the customers were asked about it."

Modern Screen’s Leo Townsend wrote that "its main assets are Jean Arthur and a sparkling script. This is probably Miss Arthur's finest performance, and she's given ample opportunity to demonstrate her delightful flair for light comedy." He criticised Director Mitchell Leisen, "who allows a number of the scenes to go slapstick", and appraised the cast with "Edward Arnold is satisfactory, but not outstanding … and Ray Milland is effective as his son. Luis Alberni is guilty of too much overacting. The picture, of course, belongs entirely to Jean Arthur, with credit for able assistance to Preston Sturges for his well-written script."

Other contemporary reviews were more positive. Motion Picture Daily regarded the slapstick elements as one of the film’s strong points and wrote that it was "destined for popularity with all audiences with resultant healthy box-office returns." It concluded with the comment, "Preston Sturges' screenplay bubbles with lively humor. Mitchell Leisen's direction drains every situation of its humorous content."

The Film Daily described it as "a wild riot of fun" and "a rough-tumble-Cinderella story [that] should click merrily at the box-office. It commented, "Director Mitchell Leisen has set a fast pace for the farce and gets a full measure of laughs from every sequence. Preston Sturges' screenplay, based on Vera Caspary's story, sets a high standard for comedy situations and dialogue."

Motion Picture Herald commented that the film was “a farce comedy dramatic treatment of the Cinderella premise” and noted that Jean Arthur who was previously best known for dramatic performances, provided a “surprise” in her comedic abilities.

On review aggregator website Rotten Tomatoes, the film has an approval rating of 100 percent based on 10 critics, with an average rating of 7.9/10, earning it a Fresh score.

== Home media ==
- Easy Living (VHS). Universal Studios. August 4, 1998.
- Easy Living (DVD (region 1)). Universal Studios. April 22, 2008.
- Easy Living (Blu-ray (region 1)). Kino Lorber. July 23, 2019.
