= The Guinea Pig (play) =

Play written by Preston Sturges

- Original language: English
- Written by: Preston Sturges
- Genre: comedy
- Setting: Office of Sam Small; Mrs. Howard's Living room

Premiere
- Date: January 7, 1929
- Place: President Theatre (Broadway); Manhattan, New York City

The Guinea Pig is a 1929 comedy in three acts by Preston Sturges, his first play to appear on Broadway.

== Broadway production ==
The Broadway production was directed by Walter Greenough and produced by Sturges. It opened on January 7, 1929 at the President Theatre in Manhattan, New York and ran for 67 performances, closing in March of the same year.

Sturges conceived of the idea for the play from personal experience, after an actress he was dating explained her erratic behavior as the result of her trying out scenarios for the play she was writing. He decided that if she could write a play, so could he, and he began writing The Guinea Pig, completing the third act that night, although the rest took somewhat longer. When he showed the result to the actress, she let on that she had never been writing a play at all, but when Sturges insisted she read some of his writing, she complimented the dialogue, saying that it was "like champagne."

Sturges was unable to find a producer who wanted to mount the play, even though a production at the Wharf Theater in Provincetown, Massachusetts was a local hit, so he and his friends decided to produce it themselves on a budget of $2,500, which was provided by a rich acquaintance. Sturges later wrote that The Guinea Pig contained the biggest laugh he ever received in the theater, when the ingenue asks the young leading man what a man would say to a woman so that she would instantly give herself to him, and the young man replies, "I wish I knew."

An original copy of the 1929 script with a cast photo sold at auction for $2,000 on July 30, 2012, at the Profiles in History auction house. Variety said the play was adaptable for film in January 1929.
