= Hail the Conquering Hero =

1944 film by Preston Sturges

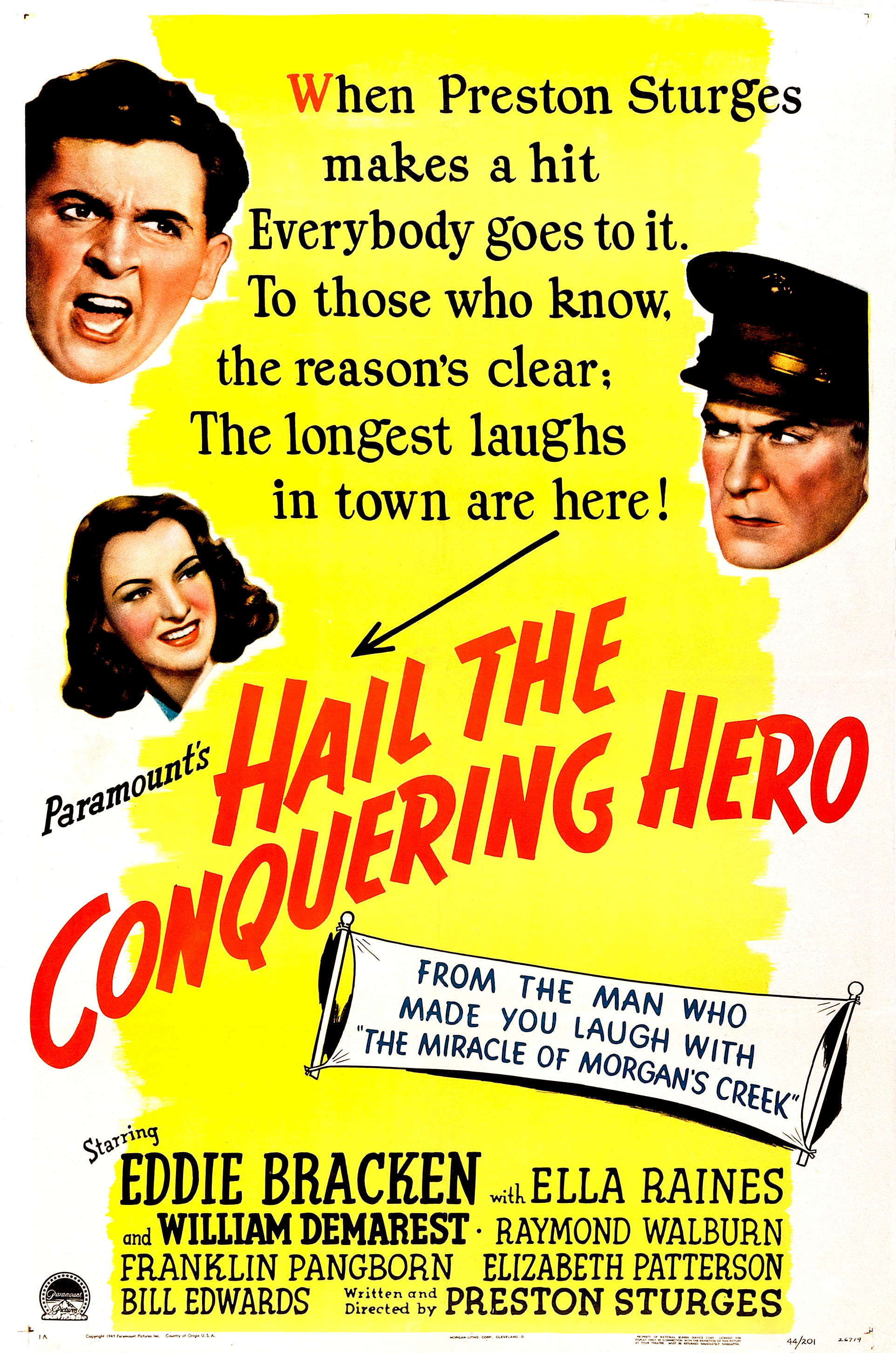
- Theatrical release poster
- Directed by: Preston Sturges
- Written by: Preston Sturges
- Produced by: Preston Sturges; Buddy G. DeSylva (uncredited)
- Starring: Eddie Bracken; Ella Raines; William Demarest
- Cinematography: John F. Seitz
- Edited by: Stuart Gilmore
- Music by: Werner R. Heymann; Victor Young; Preston Sturges; Frank Loesser; Robert Emmett Dolan
- Distributed by: Paramount Pictures
- Release date: August 9, 1944
- Running time: 101 minutes
- Country: United States
- Language: English

Hail the Conquering Hero is a 1944 American satirical comedy-drama film written and directed by Preston Sturges that stars Eddie Bracken, Ella Raines and William Demarest, supported by Raymond Walburn, Franklin Pangborn, Elizabeth Patterson, Bill Edwards and Freddie Steele. In 2015, the United States Library of Congress selected the film for preservation in the National Film Registry, finding it "culturally, historically, or aesthetically significant".

Sturges was nominated for a 1945 Academy Award for his screenplay. Many critics consider the film to be one of Sturges's best. It was the eighth film he made for Paramount Pictures, and also his last, although The Great Moment was released after it. Sturges later wrote about his departure, "I guess Paramount was glad to be rid of me eventually, as no one there ever understood a word I said."

== Plot ==
Woodrow Lafayette Pershing Truesmith is a small town boy whose father, "Hinky Dinky" Truesmith, was a Marine who died a hero in World War I. Woodrow has been discharged from the Marine Corps after only a month owing to his chronic hay fever. Rather than disappoint his mother, he pretends to be fighting overseas in World War II while secretly working in a San Diego shipyard.

In a chance encounter in a bar, he buys a round of drinks for six Marines, recently returned from the Battle of Guadalcanal and headed by Master Gunnery Sergeant Heffelfinger. It transpires that Heffelfinger served with Woodrow's father in the 6th Marines in World War I. One of the Marines decides to telephone Woodrow's mother, telling her that he has received a medical discharge, so she will not have to worry about him. Woodrow is vehemently opposed to the fraud, but the Marines are all for it. Heffelfinger embellishes the charade by having Woodrow swap coats with one of the Marines that have the 1st Marine Division Battle Blaze and Pacific Theatre of Operations medals on it.

When they step off the train, the seemingly harmless deception has escalated beyond control; the entire town turns out to greet its homegrown hero. With an election coming up, the citizens decide to make an unwilling Woodrow their candidate against the pompous current mayor, Mr. Noble. Complicating matters even further, Woodrow had written his girlfriend Libby, telling her not to wait for him. She has since gotten engaged to Forrest Noble, the mayor's son.

Finally, Woodrow can stand it no longer. He confesses everything at a campaign rally and goes home to pack. Libby breaks her engagement and tells Woodrow she is going with him. Meanwhile, Heffelfinger praises Woodrow's courage in telling the truth to the stunned townsfolk, and after considering the matter, they decide that Woodrow has just the qualities they need in a mayor.

== Cast ==
- Eddie Bracken as Woodrow Lafayette Pershing Truesmith
- Ella Raines as Libby
- Raymond Walburn as Mayor Everett D. Noble
- William Demarest as Sgt. Heffelfinger
- Franklin Pangborn as Committee Chairman
- Elizabeth Patterson as Libby's Aunt
- Georgia Caine as Mrs. Truesmith
- Al Bridge as Political Boss
- Freddie Steele as Bugsy
- Bill Edwards as Forrest Noble
- Harry Hayden as Doc Bissell
- Jimmy Conlin as Judge Dennis
- Jimmie Dundee as Cpl. Candida
- Chester Conklin as Western Union Man
- Esther Howard as Mrs. Noble
- Arthur Hoyt as Rev. Upperman
- Robert Warwick as Marine Colonel
- Torben Meyer as Mr. Schultz
- Jack Norton as Second Bandleader
- Paul Porcasi as Cafe Owner

== Songs ==
Aside from songs associated with the military, such as "Mademoiselle from Armentieres" by Harry Carlton and Joe Tunbridge and "Halls of Montezuma", music by Jacques Offenbach, Hail the Conquering Hero contains two original songs by Preston Sturges:

- "Home to the Arms of Mother" - music and lyrics by Preston Sturges, orchestral arrangement by Charles W. Bradshaw, vocal arrangements by Joseph J. Lilley
- "We Want Woodrow" - music and lyrics by Preston Sturges, arranged by Charles W. Bradshaw

Other songs in the film include two written by Frank Loesser and Robert Emmett Dolan: "Have I Stayed Away Too Long" and "Gotta Go to Jailhouse".

The score also contains excerpts from "Hail the Conquering Hero" from Judas Maccabeus by George Frideric Handel.

== Production ==
Hail the Conquering Hero had a number of working titles on its way to the screen. An early title was "Praise the Lord and Pass the Ammunition", and "Once Upon a Hero" and "The Little Marine" were also used.

Although The Great Moment, which had been filmed before Hail the Conquering Hero, was released after it, this film was the last that Sturges made for Paramount Pictures, as his contract ran out and he left the studio even before the film was completely edited. He and the studio had numerous conflicts over editorial control, censorship problems and other issues on The Great Moment and The Miracle of Morgan's Creek. The studio also balked at Sturges' repeated use of the same bit actors again and again in most of his Paramount films, what has been called his "stock company" or "repertory troupe." The studio was concerned that people would get tired of seeing the same faces, and wanted Sturges to use different actors, which he refused to do: "I always replied that these little players who had contributed so much to my first hits had a moral right to work in my subsequent pictures."

There were also conflicts with the studio about this film: Paramount wanted actress Ella Raines, who was playing "Libby", to be replaced: not only did they feel she did not look like a small-town girl, but she did not have enough box-office draw, and with the other lead roles being taken by Bracken and Demarest, the studio was concerned that the film would not have enough star power to be effectively sold. But filming had already started, and Sturges refused to replace her.

I said that had [producer] Buddy [DeSylva] been there and objected to her casting at its inception, I would of course have agreed. But to have her thrown off the picture after she had been announced for the part and had started shooting, with all the publicity that engendered, would ruin her career. It seems very unimportant now whether she was kept in or thrown out. It seemed very important then. I had read Cervantes. I should have known about tilting at windmills.

(Raines' career did not last long in any event: she retired in 1957.)

It was customary at the time for the War Department to review scripts which dealt with military matters, but the revisions they requested were minor. Filming began on Hail the Conquering Hero on July 14, 1943, and continued through September 11 of that year. Sturges had designed the film to be relatively small scale, and he re-used sets left over from The Miracle of Morgan's Creek.

After an unsuccessful preview in New York City, the film was recut by producer Buddy G. DeSylva, as Sturges had already left Paramount. After another unsuccessful preview – and, not coincidentally, after The Miracle of Morgan's Creek had been released and become a smash hit – DeSylva accepted Sturges' offer to return, unpaid, and rewrite the script. Retakes, directed by Sturges, were done from April 7 to April 11, 1944. Sturges restored his overall conception of the film.

The film was released on August 9, 1944. Sharp-eyed viewers may have noted that in the scene where the Marines leave the Oakdale station, a billboard behind them advertises The Miracle of Morgan's Creek, the film that Sturges made, also starring Eddie Bracken, immediately before this one.

Reviews were uniformly excellent, with Bosley Crowther writing in the New York Times that it was "one of the wisest [movies] ever to burst from a big-time studio." Sturges exulted that, "It proves that a good story can lick its weight in stars and pomposity any day."

Hail the Conquering Hero was released on video on November 15, 1990, on laserdisc on October 26, 1994, and was re-released on video on June 30, 1993. It was released on DVD (as part of a seven disc set entitled Preston Sturges - The Filmmaker Collection) on November 21, 2006.

== Accolades ==
Award	Category	Nominee(s)	Result
Academy Awards	Best Original Screenplay	Preston Sturges	Nominated
National Board of Review Awards	Top Ten Films		4th Place
National Board of Review Awards	Best Acting	Eddie Bracken	Won
National Board of Review Awards	Best Acting	Franklin Pangborn	Won
National Film Preservation Board	National Film Registry		Inducted
New York Film Critics Circle Awards	Best Film		Nominated
New York Film Critics Circle Awards	Best Director	Preston Sturges	Nominated

- The New York Times selected the film as one of the "Ten Best Films of 1944".

== Analysis ==
One writer described Hail the Conquering Hero as "a satire on mindless hero-worship, small-town politicians, and something we might call "Mom-ism," the almost idolatrous reverence that Americans have for the institution of Motherhood," and Sturges himself said that of all his films, it was "the one with the least wrong with it." The film has the normal hallmarks of Sturges' best work: an extremely fast pace, overlapping dialogue, and rapid-fire punch lines. Monty Python's Terry Jones called it "like a wonderful piece of clockwork." In The Nation in 1944, James Agee, critic, wrote, "The film has enough themes for half a dozen first-rate American satires—the crippling myth of the dead heroic father, the gentle tyranny of the widowed mother, the predicament of the only child, the questionable nature of most heroism, the political function of returning soldiers, these are just a few; I suppose in a sense the whole story is a sort of Coriolanus on all fours. But not one of these themes is honored by more attention than you get from an incontinent barber in a railway terminal, and the main theme, which I take to be a study of honor, is dishonored by every nightingale in Sturges's belfry ... Any adequate review of this remarkable movie would devote at least as much space to its unqualified praise as I have to qualifying the praise ... it tells a story so touching, so chock-full of human frailties and so rich in homely detail that it achieves a reality transcending the limitations of its familiar slapstick." Critic Pauline Kael states that Sturges: " ... uses verbal slapstick as well as visual slapstick, and his timing is so quirkily effective that the dialogue keeps popping off, like a string of firecrackers." Leslie Halliwell gave it three of four stars, stating: "Skillfully orchestrated Preston Sturges romp, slightly marred by an overdose of sentiment but featuring his repertory of comic actors at full pitch."

The film can be seen as a look at patriotism and hero worship in the United States during World War II, and while adhering to the Hollywood Production Code – even more restrictive in wartime – it can be seen as somewhat critical of people's willingness to uncritically embrace heroes. In this regard it is a companion piece to The Miracle of Morgan's Creek, the previous Sturges satirical venture.
