= The Great Moment (1944 film) =

1944 film by Preston Sturges

- theatrical poster
- Directed by: Preston Sturges
- Written by: René Fülöp-Miller (book); Preston Sturges; Ernst Laemmle (uncredited)
- Produced by: Buddy G. DeSylva; Preston Sturges (uncredited)
- Starring: Joel McCrea; Betty Field
- Cinematography: Victor Milner
- Edited by: Stuart Gilmore
- Music by: Victor Young
- Distributed by: Paramount Pictures
- Release dates: August 24, 1944 (Los Angeles); September 6, 1944 (U.S.)
- Running time: 80, 83, 87 or 90 min. (see #Production)
- Country: United States
- Language: English

The Great Moment is a 1944 biographical film written and directed by Preston Sturges. Based on the book Triumph Over Pain (1940) by René Fülöp-Miller, it tells the story of Dr. William Thomas Green Morton, a 19th-century Boston dentist who discovered the use of ether for general anesthesia. The film stars Joel McCrea and Betty Field, and features Harry Carey, William Demarest, Franklin Pangborn and Porter Hall.

The movie was filmed in 1942 but not released for over two years. Paramount Pictures disliked the film Sturges had made, and pulled it from his control, re-titled and re-edited it. The studio's released version was marketed in a way that made it appear to be one of Sturges' comedies. The film was not well received by the critics or the public, and marked the end of a sustained run of success for Sturges, who had already left Paramount by the time the film was released.

== Plot ==
Eben Frost is seen heading through the snow to the farmhouse of William Morton's aging widow Lizzie. On the way he stops at a pawn shop and redeems a medal once awarded to Morton inscribed: "To the benefactor of mankind. With the gratitude of humanity." At the Morton home, Lizzie reminisces to Frost about her late husband and their life together.

In the brief first flashback to several years after his discovery, Morton mortgages his farm to pay for a trip to Washington, D.C. to meet President Franklin Pierce. The president declares his intention to ratify a large monetary sum awarded to Morton by a grateful Congress, but says Morton should first legitimize his claim in court by filing a patent infringement suit against some army or navy doctor. The newspapers loudly denounce Morton's greed, the court declares his discovery unpatentable, and Morton runs amok in a shop which is capitalizing on his discovery with no credit or royalties to him.

Back in the present, Lizzie relates the details of Morton's recent death and their life together before, during, and immediately after Morton's discovery.

The second flashback, follows Morton and Lizzie's courtship, early married years, and his tribulations as a dentist with patients who fear the pain of dental operations. Morton consults his former professor Charles T. Jackson, who cantankerously suggests cooling the gums and roots with topical application of chloric ether. Morton purchases a bottle of sulphuric ether and passes out when it evaporates in the living room of his home.

Morton's former partner Horace Wells later comes by, telling of his discovery that nitrous oxide could serve as an inhalable general anesthetic. He asks Morton's assistance at a planned tooth extraction at Harvard Medical School before the class of prominent surgeon John Collins Warren. The demonstration fails when the patient cries out. Wells remains convinced of nitrous oxide's efficacy, but soon swears it off when his next patient almost fails to revive from an overdose.

Morton wonders whether sulphuric ether vapor could serve as an inhalable general anesthetic instead. He tries the gas on patient Frost, who goes berserk. Morton consults Jackson, who explains that the ether must be of the highly rectified type. The next trial with Frost succeeds. Morton, who is camouflaging the smell of the sulphuric ether and calling it "Letheon," is soon raking in a fortune with his painless dentistry. However, Jackson and Wells now accuse Morton of having stolen their respective ideas.

Morton begins thinking about the possible use of his "Letheon" in general surgery. He approaches surgeon Warren, who is highly skeptical but agrees to a demonstration at Massachusetts General Hospital. The operation (on October 16, 1846), the excising of a neck tumor before doctors and students in the operating theater, proceeds painlessly. Warren now schedules a public demonstration for a more serious operation—a leg amputation.

On the scheduled day, representatives of the state Medical Society, jealous of the success of this upstart dentist, demand that, in accordance with established medical ethics, Morton first reveal the chemical composition of his "Letheon." Morton refuses to do so until his pending patent is granted, but says that in the meantime he will let all hospitals and charitable institutions (though not his rival dentists) use his compound free of charge. The Medical Society's men declare this unacceptable, so surgeon Warren says he has no alternative but to perform the scheduled amputation without anesthesia.

As the bewildered Morton wanders through the hospital corridors, he comes across the girl whose leg is to amputated, being prayed over by a priest. Taking pity on her, he marches into the operating theater to reveal his secret to surgeon Warren—and to the world.

== Cast ==
- Joel McCrea as William Thomas Green Morton
- Betty Field as Elizabeth Morton
- Harry Carey as Prof. Warren
- William Demarest as Eben Frost
- Louis Jean Heydt as Dr. Horace Wells
- Julius Tannen as Dr. Charles Jackson
- Edwin Maxwell as Vice-President of Medical Society
- Porter Hall as President Franklin Pierce
- Franklin Pangborn as Dr. Heywood
- Grady Sutton as Homer Quimby
- Donivee Lee as Betty Morton
- Harry Hayden as Judge Shipman
- Torben Meyer as Dr. Dahlmeyer
- Victor Potel as First Dental Patient
- Thurston Hall as Senator Borland
- J. Farrell MacDonald as The Priest
- Heinie Conklin as Janitor (uncredited)
- Harry Tenbrook as Man at Bar (uncredited)

== Production ==
The saga of The Great Moment – which during various stages of its development was called "Immortal Secret," "Great Without Glory," "Morton the Magnificent" and "Triumph Over Pain" – begins in 1939, with a screenplay for Paramount Pictures about the life of W.T.G. Morton, written by Preston Sturges, Irwin Shaw, Les River, Charles Brackett and Waldo Twitchell. The film was to be directed by Henry Hathaway, produced by Arthur Hornblow Jr. and William LeBaron, with Gary Cooper and Walter Brennan to star as Morton and Eben Frost.

When Cooper left Paramount, production was delayed, although there may have been other reasons as well. It's unlikely that any footage was actually shot at that time, but Paramount did go so far as to check with historians and dental organizations to confirm the screenplay's depiction of Morton, finding that opinion was divided on his character and on his claim to have discovered the first practical anesthesia. In fact, when Rene Fulop-Miller's book Triumph over Pain was published in 1940, it caused a storm of controversy, as many disputed its claims regarding Morton. It is now recognized that Dr. Crawford Long's use of ether predated Dr. Morton's use, although Morton is credited for widely publicizing the technique.

Paramount executives were losing interest in the project, but Sturges had become enthralled by it, seeing an opportunity to combine the themes of sacrifice, triumph and tragedy with elements of madcap, satire and the fickleness of fate and luck. Sturges' commercial and critical success was such that the studio executives, though sceptical of the Morton movie, were willing to indulge him and let him direct it if at the same time he would keep turning out the kind of films which were proven hits.

Paramount bought the rights to an MGM short film Life of William Morton, Discoverer of Anesthesia, which is not credited in the released film as a source. Sturges then revised the 1939 screenplay with Ernst Laemmle, whose work was uncredited. At that time, Walter Huston was being considered to play the lead.

The film went into production on 8 April 1942 and wrapped on 5 June, on budget and a day under schedule. (In the sequence of Sturges' films, that's after the filming of The Palm Beach Story but before its release, and before both The Miracle of Morgan's Creek and Hail the Conquering Hero began shooting.) Joel McCrea, who had just starred in The Palm Beach Story played Morton – McCrea told Sturges that he only gained good roles when Gary Cooper was unavailable – and William Demarest played Eben Frost, giving a "gem of a performance" in one of his "strongest and most important roles".

Sturges explained his unusual choice of having his two flashbacks in reverse chronological order (the first flashback telling, however briefly, of episodes in Morton's life post-discovery and post-sacrifice, then the second, much longer flashback telling of his life up to and including his discovery and sacrifice) as follows: "Unfortunately, I was not around in 1846 to direct Dr. Morton's life. [...] Since [a director-biographer with integrity] cannot change the chronology of events, he can only change the order of their presentation. Dr. Morton's life, as lived, was a very bad piece of dramatic construction. He had a few months of excitement ending in triumph and twenty years of disillusionment, boredom, and increasing bitterness."

== Sturges' edits ==
In the process of adapting and shooting the script, Sturges made a few changes. An earlier version had young student Morton and his fiancée Lizzie engaging in ether frolics at a party. Sturges decided it would be more appropriate to have Morton introduced cold to ether as a dentist.

In a previous script, as Morton enters the operating theater to reveal the secret of his anesthetic to Dr. Warren and the world, there was to be dialogue between them (hesitation ellipses in original):

Morton: "Professor Warren, it's called ... sulphuric ether ... highly rectified."

Prof. Warren: (stupefied) "You mean plain C_{2}H_{5}OC_{2}H_{5}?"

Morton: (lifts his arms helplessly) "I don't know ... I guess so."

Warren: (seizing his hands) "Oh, my boy ... my boy."

Sturges decided to eliminate this dialogue.

The Morton story particularly intrigued Sturges because it contrasted with recent highly successful medical biopics by Warner Bros.: The Story of Louis Pasteur (1936) and Dr. Ehrlich's Magic Bullet (1940). Sturges wished to eschew the "traditional smugness" of the "hand-in-the-bosom-prematurely-turned-to-marble form of biography," the "Pasteur manner, where every character knows his place in History."

== Studio edits ==
Paramount did not immediately release the film, because they disliked the non-sequential arrangement of the scenes, the tone of some of the acting, and the prologue.

The film was taken away from Sturges by executive producer Buddy G. DeSylva, who never quite trusted him and resented the control Sturges had over his projects, and found the Morton story unsuitable for mainstream audiences.

Sturges had shot the prologue as a voice-over to open the film:

One of the most charming characteristics of Homo sapiens, the wise guy on your right, is the consistency with which he has stoned, crucified, hanged, flayed, boiled in oil and otherwise rid himself of those who consecrated their lives to further his comfort and well-being, so that all his strength and cunning might be preserved for the erection of ever larger monuments, memorial shafts, triumphal arches, pyramids and obelisks to the eternal glory of generals on horseback, tyrants, usurpers, dictators, politicians, and other heroes who led him, from the rear, to dismemberment and death. This is the story of the Boston dentist who gave you ether-before whom in all time surgery was agony, since whom science has control of pain. It should be almost unnecessary then to tell you that this man, whose contribution to human mercy is unparalleled in the history of the world, was ridiculed, reviled, burned in effigy and eventually driven to despair and death by the beneficiaries of his revelation. Paramount Pictures, Incorporated, has the honor of bringing you, at long last, the true story of an American of supreme achievement – W.T.G. Morton of Boston, Massachusetts, in a motion picture called Triumph Over Pain.

This prologue was deemed by the studio to be inopportune during World War Two. The film as released now opens with this prologue, in titles rather than voice-over, written by Sturges when it was clear that no satisfactory revision to the original prologue was feasible:

It does not seem to be generally understood that before ether there was nothing. The patient was strapped down...that is all. This is the story of W. T. G. Morton of Boston, Mass., before whom in all time surgery was agony, since whom science has control of pain. Of all things in nature great men alone reverse the laws of perspective and grow smaller as one approaches them. Dwarfed by the magnitude of his revelation, reviled, hated by his fellow men, forgotten before he was remembered, Morton seems very small indeed until the incandescent moment he ruined himself for a servant girl and gained immortality.

The film was heavily re-cut, to the point that some of the narrative became almost incomprehensible.

Eliminated from the re-cut version was a brief sequence which preceded even the framing story with Frost and widow Lizzie. This initial sequence shifted back and forth between a scene of child in a contemporary hospital (early 1940s) being wheeled into the operating room and being assured by his parents that the operation will not hurt and a scene of a broken and impoverished Morton in the previous century pawning his medals.

The first flashback sequence was cut particularly heavily by the studio, since it was not only chronologically subsequent to the second flashback, but also was almost totally devoid of humor. The most significant segment eliminated from the first flashback was Morton's confession to Lizzie on the evening after his sacrifice, which would have appeared very early in the sequence. It reads in part (hesitation ellipses in original):

Morton: "[T]oday at the hospital ... the Medical Society wouldn't let them use the Letheon ... unless they knew what it was so ... they asked me what it was."

Mrs Morton: (Staccato and smiling, on the verge of hysteria) "But you didn't just tell them ..." (She twists her hands) "... I mean you weren't such a fool as to tell them the most valuable secret in the world, JUST FOR THE ASKING?"

Morton: (Miserably) "But Lizzie they were going to take her leg off without it ... without anything!" (He seems on the verge of hysteria himself) "They were just going to strap her down and hack it off!"

Mrs. Morton: (Vehemently) "Whose leg?"

Morton: (With a trace of exasperation) "I don't know ... some servant girl!"

The studio was concerned that revealing the nature of Morton's sacrifice so early in the movie would lessen the dramatic impact of that sacrifice at the climax. The downside of the elimination of this scene was, however, that the audience was all the less aware of how the remaining events in the first flashback sequence, especially as further whittled down by the studio, related to the story. (The reference in the prologue to Morton's having "ruined himself for a servant girl" is left hanging and would seem to point to, if anything, some illicit affair.)

The second flashback (which forms the great majority of the film) was left comparably intact, for it was the traditional linear narrative with which the Hollywood film industry was most comfortable. Particularly, the humorous and slapstick episodes, which Paramount felt that audiences expected from a Sturges film, were preserved—so much so that Sturges suspected the film was being "cut for comedy." The title was changed over Sturges' strong objections—unclear is whether the "great moment" refers to the first ether operation or Morton's sacrifice at the climax. (Because of the re-editing, the film is listed with various runtimes of 80, 83, 87, and 90 minutes, and some of the actors listed in official cast lists may not actually appear in the film.) At some point in this process, Sturges' contract with Paramount ran out, and he left the studio (although he came back to do some unpaid re-shooting and re-editing of Hail the Conquering Hero) Sturges later wrote about his departure "I guess Paramount was glad to be rid of me eventually, as no one there ever understood a word I said."

The Great Moment premiered in Los Angeles on August 24, 1944, more than two years after filming had wrapped, and went into general release on September 6 of that year. The film was not well-received, either by the critics or at the box-office, becoming the only film directed by Sturges for Paramount not to turn a profit. Sturges' reputation never quite recovered from its failure, and his post-Paramount career is the record of a sad decline.

The Great Moment was released on video in the U.S. on November 11, 1990, and re-released on June 30, 1993. It was released on Laserdisc on October 26, 1994. It was released on DVD (as part of a seven-disc set entitled Preston Sturges - The Filmmaker Collection) on November 21, 2006.
