= 17th Academy Awards =

- Date: March 15, 1945
- Site: Grauman's Chinese Theatre, Hollywood, California
- Hosted by: John Cromwell; Bob Hope

Highlights
- Best Picture: Going My Way
- Most awards: Going My Way (7)
- Most nominations: Going My Way and Wilson (10)

The 17th Academy Awards were held on March 15, 1945, at Grauman's Chinese Theatre, honoring the films of 1944. This was the first time the complete awards ceremony was broadcast nationally, on the Blue Network (later ABC Radio). Bob Hope hosted the 70-minute broadcast, which included film clips that required explanation for the radio audience.

Darryl F. Zanuck and 20th Century-Fox spent a fortune promoting Wilson out of determination to have it win the Best Picture Oscar, but it lost to Going My Way, which made Zanuck bitter.

This year was notable for being the only time an individual was nominated for two acting awards for the same role in the same film: Barry Fitzgerald received nominations for both Best Actor and Best Supporting Actor for his performance as Father Fitzgibbon in the Best Picture winner Going My Way. Fitzgerald won for Best Supporting Actor, while his co-star Bing Crosby won Best Actor.

== Winners and nominees ==
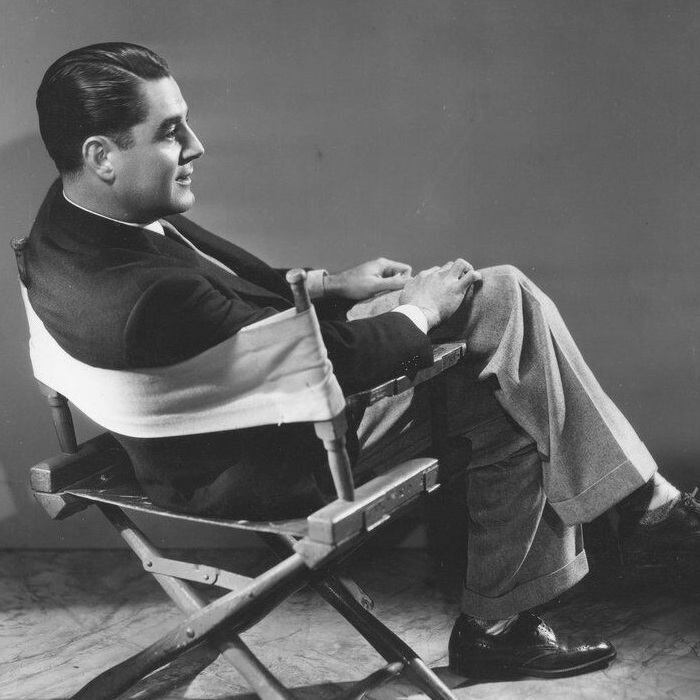
Leo McCarey, Best Picture, Best Director and Best Writing (Original Motion Picture Story) winner

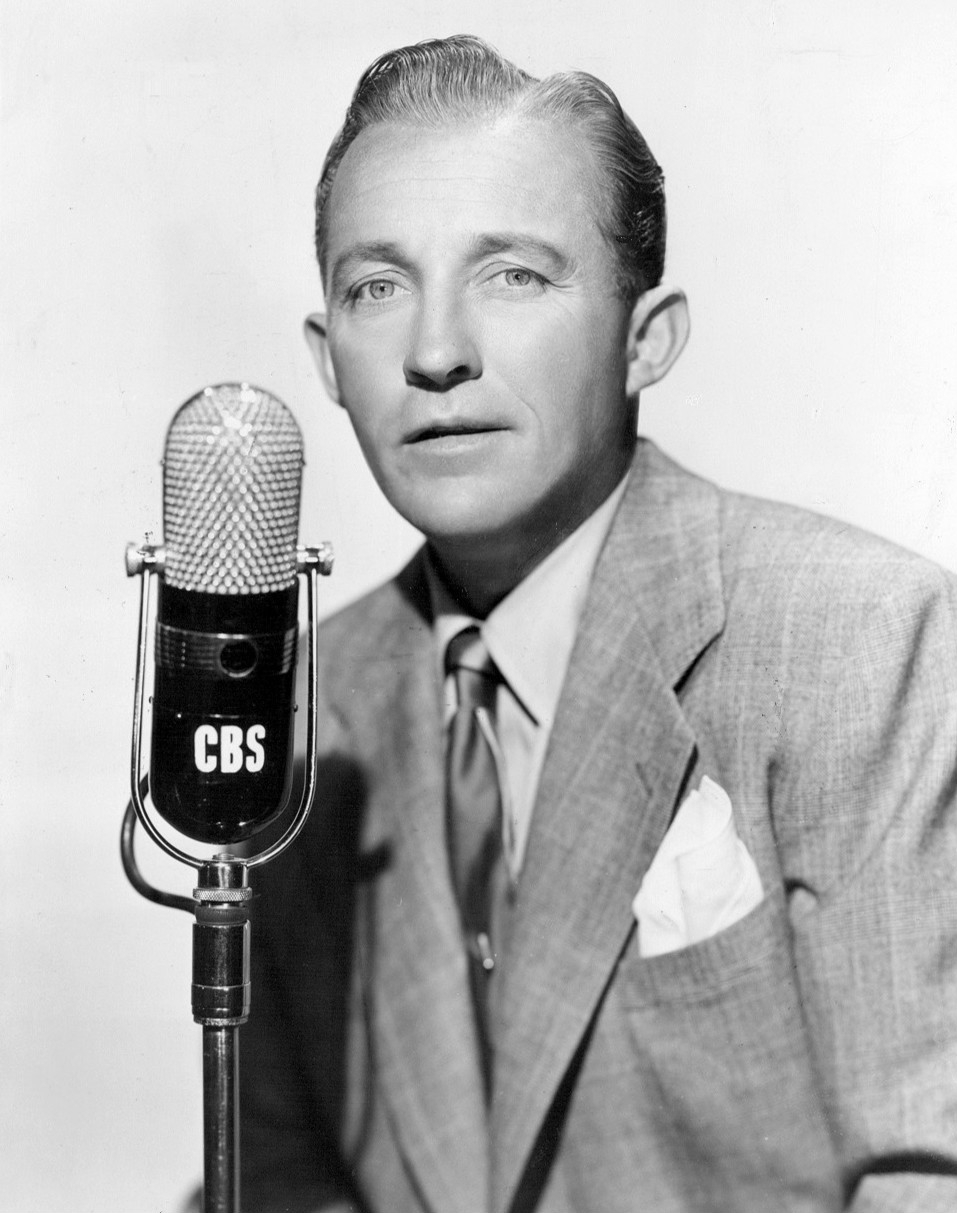
Bing Crosby; Best Actor winner

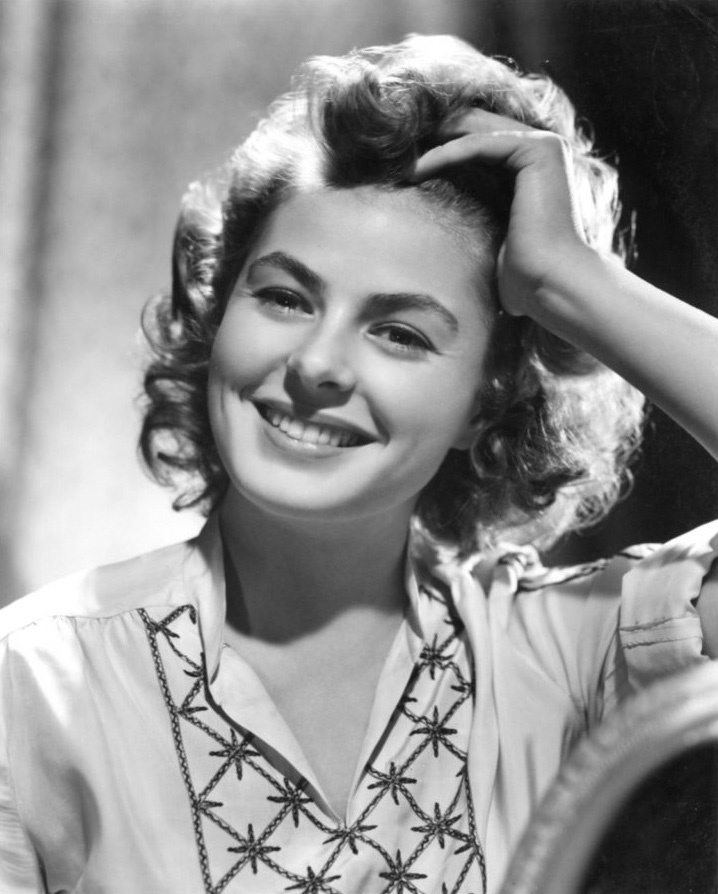
Ingrid Bergman; Best Actress winner

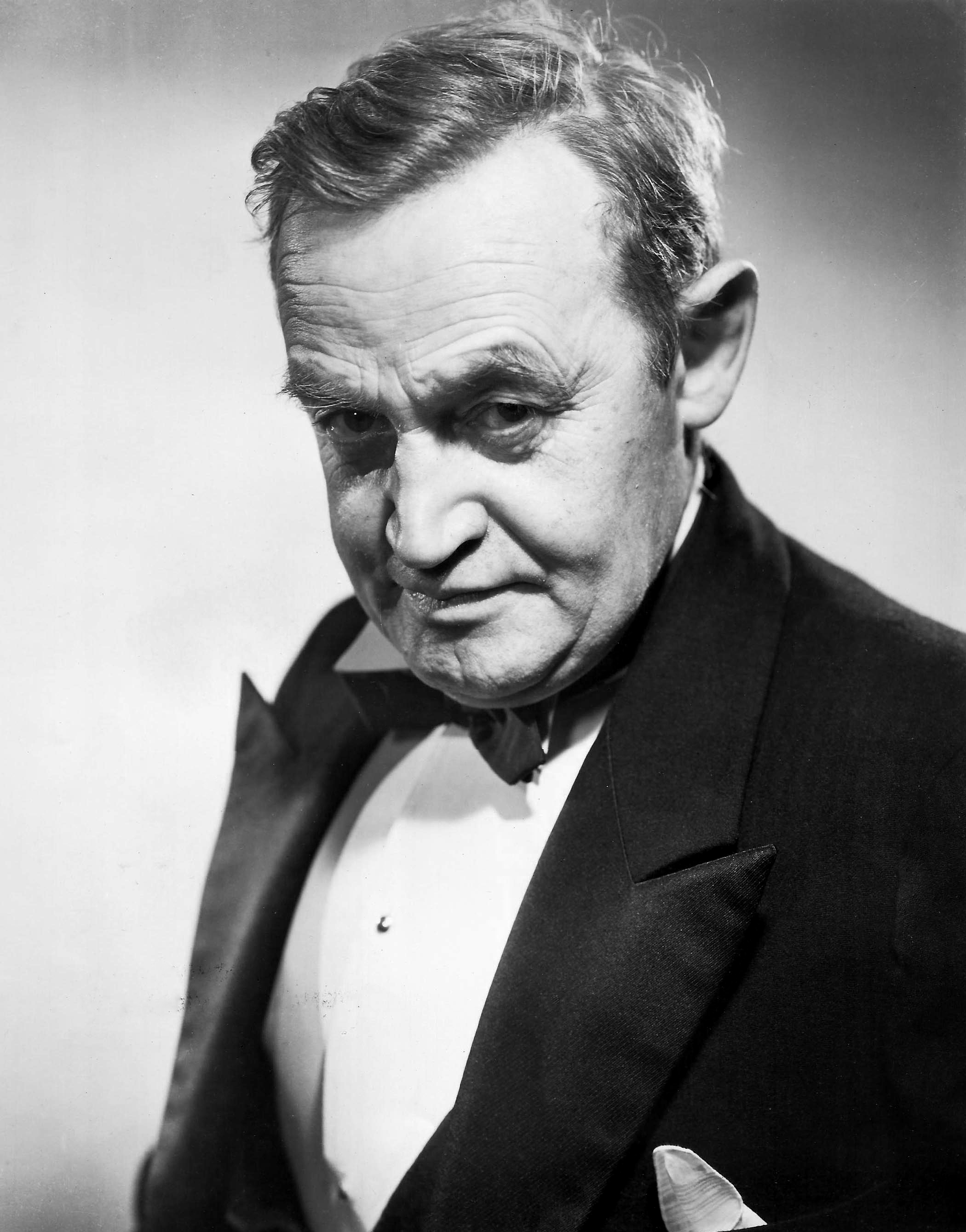
Barry Fitzgerald; Best Supporting Actor winner

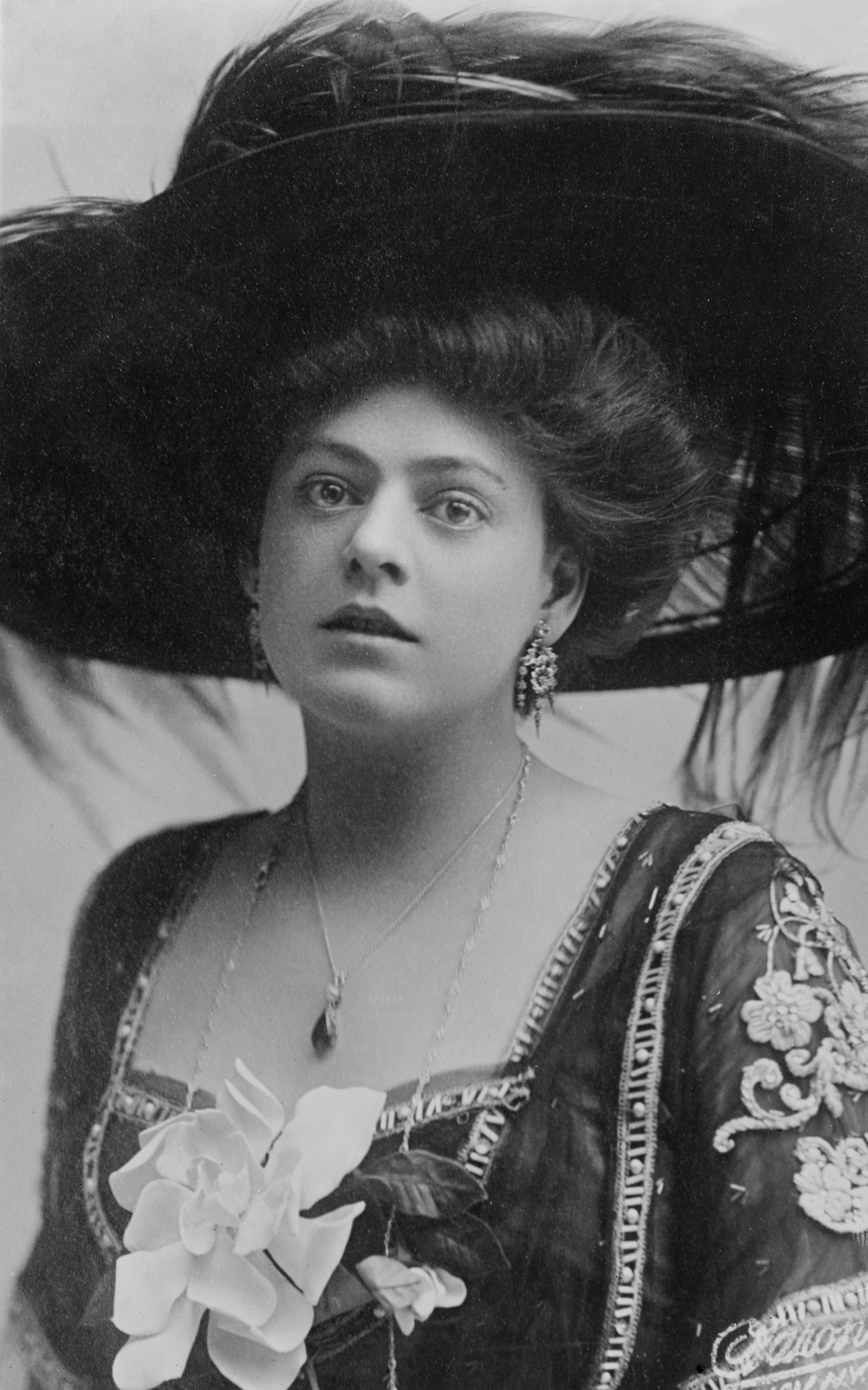
Ethel Barrymore; Best Supporting Actress winner

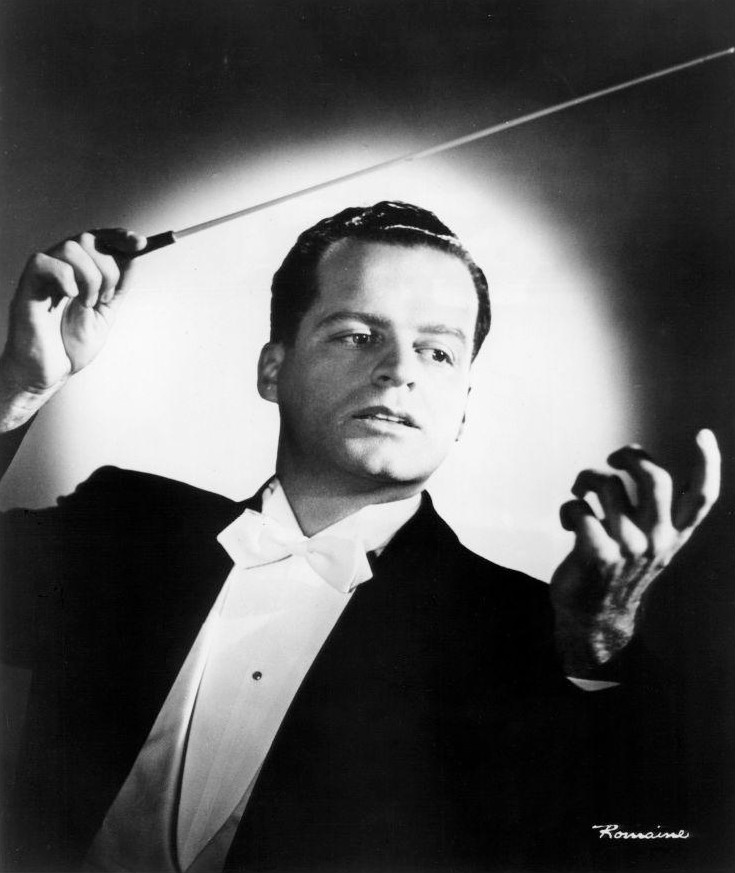
Carmen Dragon; Best Scoring of a Musical Picture co-winner

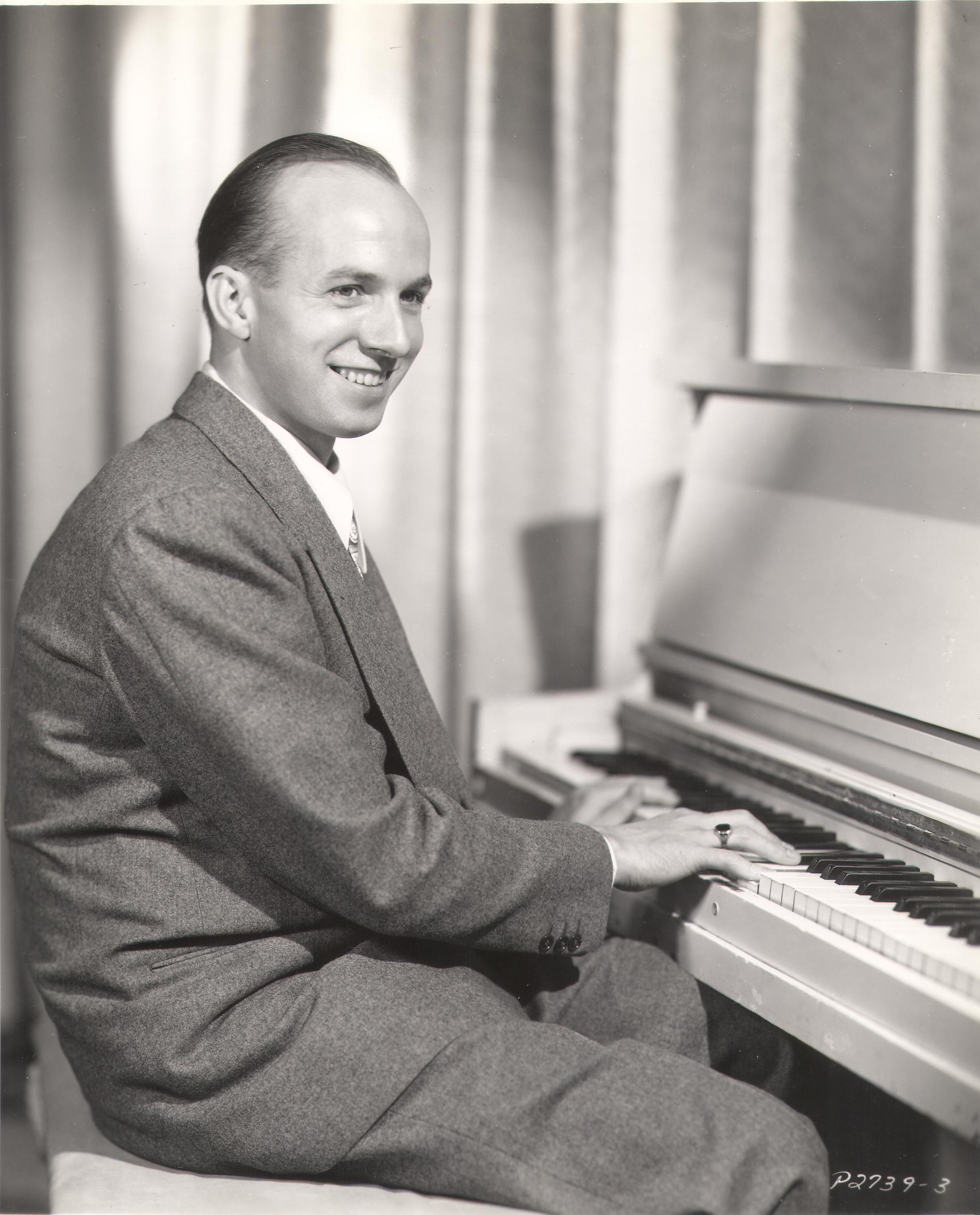
Jimmy Van Heusen; Best Song co-winner

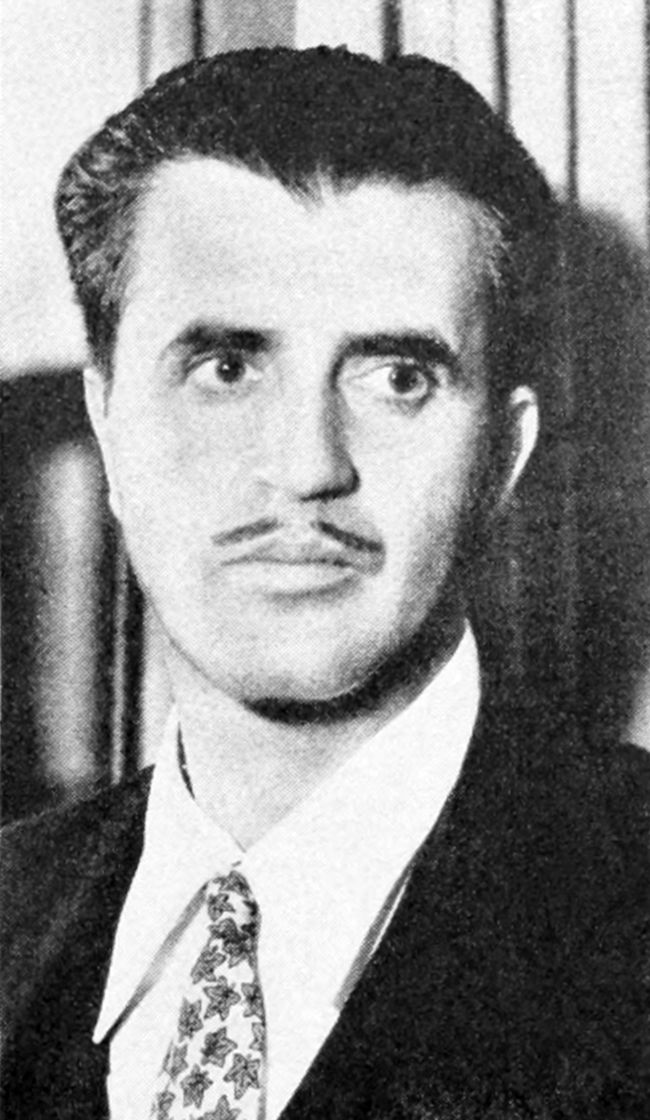
Cedric Gibbons; Best Art Direction, Black-and-White co-winner

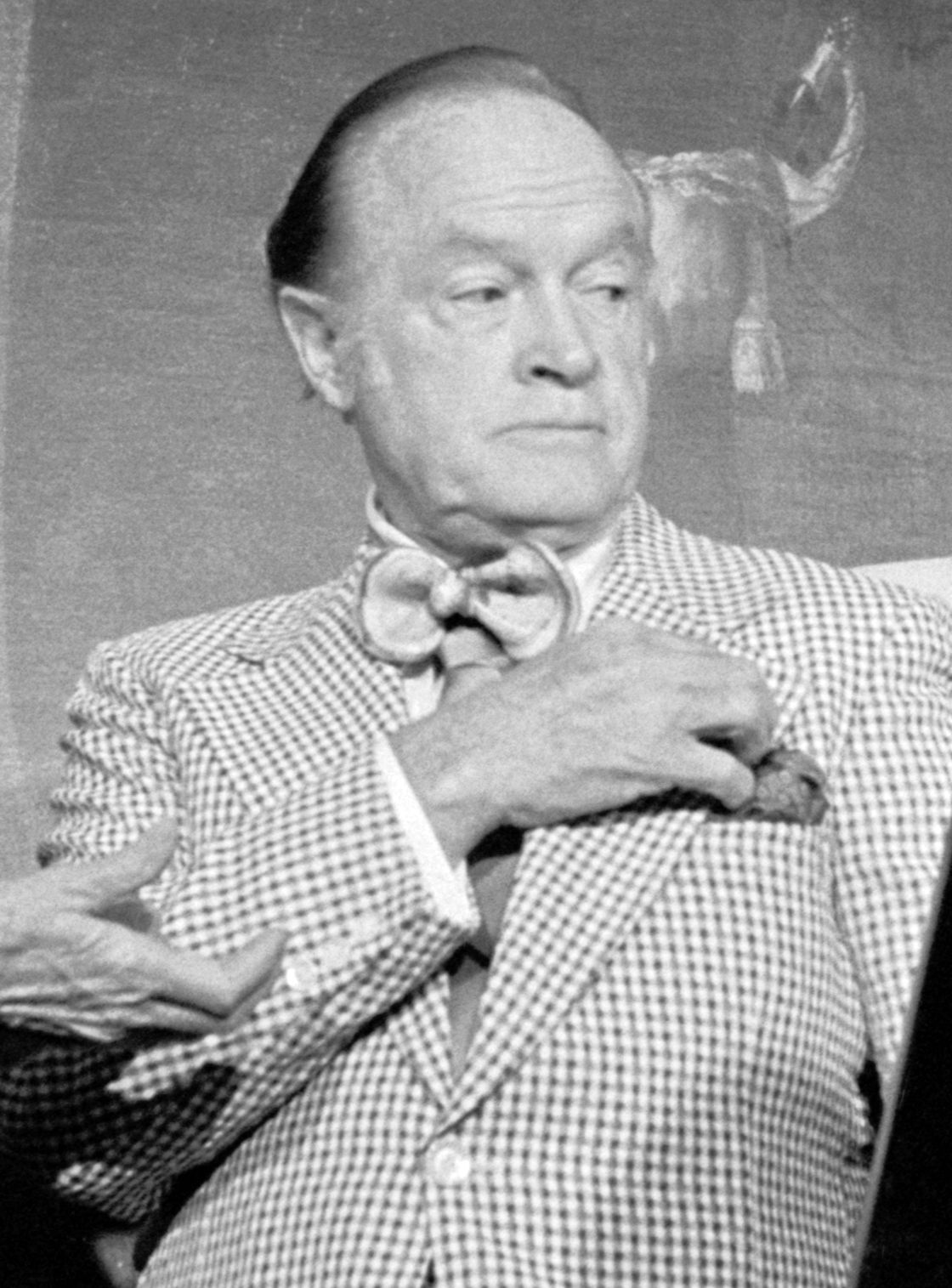
Bob Hope; Academy Honorary Award recipient

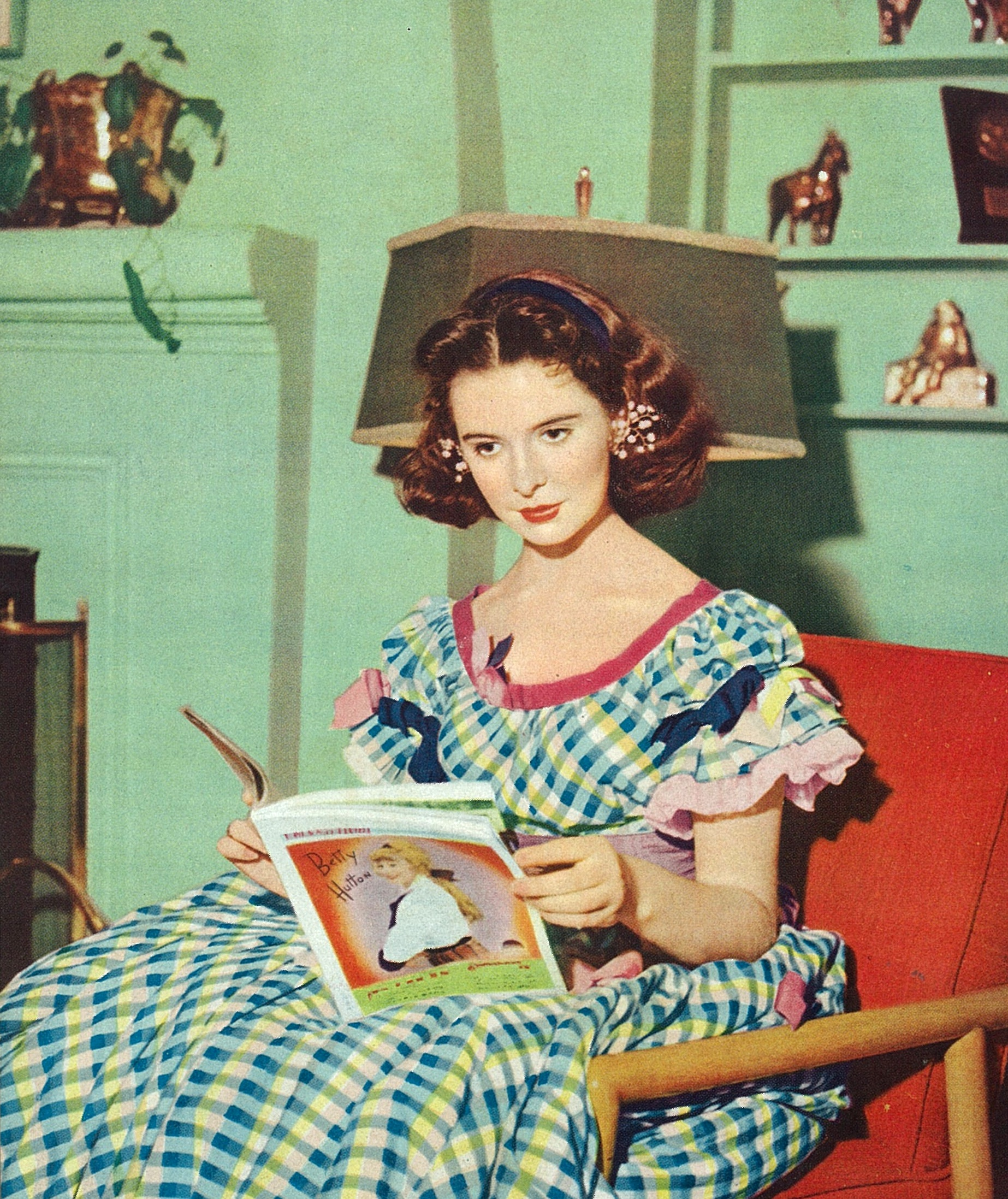
Margaret O'Brien; Juvenile Academy Award recipient

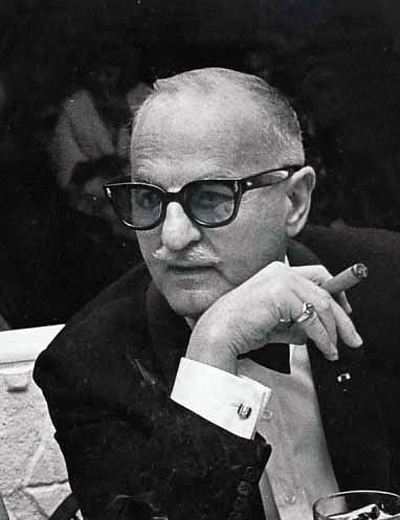
Darryl F. Zanuck; Irving G. Thalberg Memorial Award recipient

=== Awards ===
Nominees were announced on February 3, 1945. Winners are listed first and highlighted in boldface.

**Best Motion Picture**: **Going My Way – Leo McCarey for Paramount**; Double Indemnity – Joseph Sistrom for Paramount; Gaslight – Arthur Hornblow Jr. for Metro-Goldwyn-Mayer; Since You Went Away – David O. Selznick for United Artists; Wilson – Darryl F. Zanuck for 20th Century Fox	**Best Directing**: **Leo McCarey – Going My Way**; Billy Wilder – Double Indemnity; Otto Preminger – Laura; Alfred Hitchcock – Lifeboat; Henry King – Wilson
**Best Actor**: **Bing Crosby – Going My Way as Father Chuck O'Malley**; Charles Boyer – Gaslight as Gregory Anton/Sergius Bauer; Barry Fitzgerald – Going My Way as Father Fitzgibbon; Cary Grant – None but the Lonely Heart as Ernie Mott; Alexander Knox – Wilson as Woodrow Wilson	**Best Actress**: **Ingrid Bergman – Gaslight as Paula Alquist Anton**; Claudette Colbert – Since You Went Away as Mrs Anne Hilton; Bette Davis – Mr. Skeffington as Frances Beatrice "Fanny" Trellis Skeffington; Greer Garson – Mrs. Parkington as Susie Parkington; Barbara Stanwyck – Double Indemnity as Phyllis Dietrichson
**Best Actor in a Supporting Role**: **Barry Fitzgerald – Going My Way as Father Fitzgibbon**; Hume Cronyn – The Seventh Cross as Paul Roeder; Claude Rains – Mr. Skeffington as Job Skeffington; Clifton Webb – Laura as Waldo Lydecker; Monty Woolley – Since You Went Away as Colonel William G. Smollett	**Best Actress in a Supporting Role**: **Ethel Barrymore – None but the Lonely Heart as Ma Mott**; Jennifer Jones – Since You Went Away as Jane Deborah Hilton; Angela Lansbury – Gaslight as Nancy Oliver; Aline MacMahon – Dragon Seed as Ling Tan's Wife; Agnes Moorehead – Mrs. Parkington as Baroness Aspasia Conti
**Best Writing (Original Motion Picture Story)**: **Going My Way – Leo McCarey**; A Guy Named Joe – David Boehm and Chandler Sprague; Lifeboat – John Steinbeck; None Shall Escape – Alfred Neumann and Joseph Than; The Sullivans – Edward Doherty and Jules Schermer	**Best Writing (Original Screenplay)**: **Wilson – Lamar Trotti**; Hail the Conquering Hero – Preston Sturges; The Miracle of Morgan's Creek – Preston Sturges; Two Girls and a Sailor – Richard Connell and Gladys Lehman; Wing and a Prayer, The Story of Carrier X – Jerome Cady
**Best Writing (Screenplay)**: **Going My Way – Frank Butler and Frank Cavett, based on a story by Leo McCarey**; Double Indemnity – Raymond Chandler and Billy Wilder, based on Double Indemnity in Three of a Kind by James M. Cain; Gaslight – John L. Balderston, Walter Reisch, and John Van Druten, based on Angel Street by Patrick Hamilton; Laura – Jay Dratler, Samuel Hoffenstein, and Betty Reinhardt, based on the novel by Vera Caspary; Meet Me in St. Louis – Irving Brecher and Fred F. Finklehoffe, based on the novel by Sally Benson	**Best Documentary (Feature)**: **The Fighting Lady** **– United States Navy**; Resisting Enemy Interrogation – United States Army Air Force
**Best Documentary (Short Subject)**: **With the Marines at Tarawa** **– United States Marine Corps**; Hymn of the Nations – United States Office of War Information, Overseas Motion Picture Bureau; New Americans – RKO Radio	**Best Short Subject (One-Reel)**: **Who's Who in Animal Land – Jerry Fairbanks**; Blue Grass Gentlemen – Edmund Reek; Jammin' the Blues – Gordon Hollingshead; Movie Pests – Pete Smith; Screen Snapshots' 50th Anniversary of Motion Pictures – Ralph Staub
**Best Short Subject (Two-Reel)**: **I Won't Play – Gordon Hollingshead**; Bombalera – Louis Harris; Main Street Today – Jerry Bresler and Herbert Moulton	**Best Short Subject (Cartoon)**: **Mouse Trouble – Fred Quimby**; And to Think I Saw It on Mulberry Street – George Pal; Dog, Cat and Canary – Raymond Katz; Fish Fry – Walter Lantz; How to Play Football – Walt Disney; My Boy, Johnny – Paul Terry; Swooner Crooner – Edward Selzer
**Best Music (Music Score of a Dramatic or Comedy Picture)**: **Since You Went Away – Max Steiner**; Address Unknown – Morris Stoloff and Ernst Toch; The Adventures of Mark Twain – Max Steiner; The Bridge of San Luis Rey – Dimitri Tiomkin; Casanova Brown – Arthur Lange; Christmas Holiday – H. J. Salter; Double Indemnity – Miklós Rózsa; The Fighting Seabees – Walter Scharf and Roy Webb; The Hairy Ape – Edward Paul and Michel Michelet; It Happened Tomorrow – Robert Stolz; Jack London – Frederic Efrem Rich; Kismet – Herbert Stothart; None but the Lonely Heart – Hanns Eisler and C. Bakaleinikoff; The Princess and the Pirate – David Rose; Summer Storm – Karl Hajos; Three Russian Girls – Franke Harling; Up in Mabel's Room – Edward Paul; Voice in the Wind – Michel Michelet; Wilson – Alfred Newman; The Woman of the Town – Miklós Rózsa	**Best Music (Scoring of a Musical Picture)**: **Cover Girl – Morris Stoloff and Carmen Dragon**; Brazil – Walter Scharf; Higher and Higher – C. Bakaleinikoff; Hollywood Canteen – Ray Heindorf; Irish Eyes Are Smiling – Alfred Newman; Knickerbocker Holiday – Werner R. Heymann and Kurt Weill; Lady in the Dark – Robert Emmett Dolan; Lady, Let's Dance – Edward Kay; Meet Me in St. Louis – Georgie Stoll; The Merry Monahans – H. J. Salter; Minstrel Man – Ferde Grofé and Leo Erdody; Sensations of 1945 – Mahlon Merrick; Song of the Open Road – Charles Previn; Up in Arms – Ray Heindorf and Louis Forbes
**Best Music (Song)**: **"Swinging on a Star" from Going My Way – Music by James Van Heusen; Lyrics by Johnny Burke**; "I Couldn't Sleep a Wink Last Night" from Higher and Higher – Music by Jimmy McHugh; Lyrics by Harold Adamson; "I'll Walk Alone" from Follow the Boys – Music by Jule Styne; Lyrics by Sammy Cahn; "I'm Making Believe" from Sweet and Lowdown – Music by James V. Monaco; Lyrics by Mack Gordon; "Long Ago and Far Away" from Cover Girl – Music by Jerome Kern; Lyrics by Ira Gershwin; "Now I Know" from Up in Arms – Music by Harold Arlen; Lyrics by Ted Koehler; "Remember Me to Carolina" from Minstrel Man – Music by Harry Revel; Lyrics by Paul Webster; "Rio de Janeiro" from Brazil – Music by Ary Barroso; Lyrics by Ned Washington; "Silver Shadows and Golden Dreams" from Lady, Let's Dance – Music by Lew Pollack; Lyrics by Charles Newman; "Sweet Dreams Sweetheart" from Hollywood Canteen – Music by M. K. Jerome; Lyrics by Ted Koehler; "Too Much in Love" from Song of the Open Road – Music by Walter Kent; Lyrics by Kim Gannon; "The Trolley Song" from Meet Me in St. Louis – Music and Lyrics by Ralph Blane and Hugh Martin	**Best Sound Recording**: **Wilson – Edmund H. Hansen**; Brazil – Daniel J. Bloomberg; Casanova Brown – Thomas T. Moulton; Cover Girl – John P. Livadary; Double Indemnity – Loren L. Ryder; His Butler's Sister – Bernard B. Brown; Hollywood Canteen – Nathan Levinson; It Happened Tomorrow – Jack Whitney; Kismet – Douglas Shearer; Music in Manhattan – Stephen Dunn; Voice in the Wind – W. M. Dalgleish
**Best Art Direction (Black-and-White)**: **Gaslight – Art Direction: Cedric Gibbons and William Ferrari; Interior Decoration: Paul Huldschinsky and Edwin B. Willis**; Address Unknown – Art Direction: Lionel Banks and Walter Holscher; Interior Decoration: Joseph Kish; The Adventures of Mark Twain – Art Direction: John Hughes; Interior Decoration: Fred M. MacLean; Casanova Brown – Art Direction: Perry Ferguson; Interior Decoration: Julia Heron; Laura – Art Direction: Lyle R. Wheeler and Leland Fuller; Interior Decoration: Thomas Little; No Time for Love – Art Direction: Hans Dreier and Robert Usher; Interior Decoration: Samuel M. Comer; Since You Went Away – Art Direction: Mark-Lee Kirk; Interior Decoration: Victor A. Gangelin; Step Lively – Art Direction: Albert S. D'Agostino and Carroll Clark; Interior Decoration: Darrell Silvera and Claude Carpenter; ~~Song of the Open Road – N/A~~ (nomination withdrawn by production company)	**Best Art Direction (Color)**: **Wilson – Art Direction: Wiard Ihnen; Interior Decoration: Thomas Little**; The Climax – Art Direction: John B. Goodman and Alexander Golitzen; Interior Decoration: Russell A. Gausman and Ira S. Webb; Cover Girl – Art Direction: Lionel Banks and Cary Odell; Interior Decoration: Fay Babcock; The Desert Song – Art Direction: Charles Novi; Interior Decoration: Jack McConaghy; Kismet – Art Direction: Cedric Gibbons and Daniel B. Cathcart; Interior Decoration: Edwin B. Willis and Richard Pefferle; Lady in the Dark – Art Direction: Hans Dreier and Raoul Pene Du Bois; Interior Decoration: Ray Moyer; The Princess and the Pirate – Art Direction: Ernst Fegté; Interior Decoration: Howard Bristol
**Best Cinematography (Black-and-White)**: **Laura – Joseph LaShelle**; Double Indemnity – John F. Seitz; Dragon Seed – Sidney Wagner; Gaslight – Joseph Ruttenberg; Going My Way – Lionel Lindon; Lifeboat – Glen MacWilliams; Since You Went Away – Stanley Cortez and Lee Garmes; Thirty Seconds Over Tokyo – Robert L. Surtees and Harold Rosson; The Uninvited – Charles Lang; The White Cliffs of Dover – George J. Folsey	**Best Cinematography (Color)**: **Wilson – Leon Shamroy**; Cover Girl – Rudolph Maté and Allen M. Davey; Home in Indiana – Edward Cronjager; Kismet – Charles Rosher; Lady in the Dark – Ray Rennahan; Meet Me in St. Louis – George J. Folsey
**Best Film Editing**: **Wilson – Barbara McLean**; Going My Way – Leroy Stone; Janie – Owen Marks; None but the Lonely Heart – Roland Gross; Since You Went Away – Hal C. Kern and James E. Newcom	**Best Special Effects**: **Thirty Seconds Over Tokyo – Photographic Effects: A. Arnold Gillespie, Donald Jahraus and Warren Newcombe; Sound Effects: Douglas Shearer**; The Adventures of Mark Twain – Photographic Effects: Paul Detlefsen and John Crouse; Sound Effects: Nathan Levinson; Days of Glory – Photographic Effects: Vernon L. Walker; Sound Effects: James G. Stewart and Roy Granville; Secret Command – Photographic Effects: David Allen, Ray Cory and Robert Wright; Sound Effects: Russell Malmgren and Harry Kusnick; Since You Went Away – Photographic Effects: John R. Cosgrove; Sound Effects: Arthur Johns; The Story of Dr. Wassell – Photographic Effects: Farciot Edouart and Gordon Jennings; Sound Effects: George Dutton; Wilson – Photographic Effects: Fred Sersen; Sound Effects: Roger Heman Sr.

=== Special awards ===
- To Margaret O'Brien, outstanding child actress of 1944.
- To Bob Hope for his many services to the Academy.

=== Irving G. Thalberg Memorial Award ===
- Darryl F. Zanuck

== Presenters and performers ==
=== Presenters ===
(in order of appearance)

- Walter Wanger (Presenter: Academy Honorary Award to Bob Hope)
- Bob Hope (Presenter: Best Art Direction (Black-and-White), Best Art Direction (Color), Best Cinematography (Black-and-White), Best Cinematography (Color), Best Documentary Feature, Best Documentary Short Subject, Best Film Editing, Best Live Action Short Subject (One-Reel), Best Scoring of a Musical Picture, Best Scoring of a Dramatic or Comedy Picture, Best Song, Best Sound Recording, Best Special Effects, and the Scientific & Technical Awards)
- Hugo Butler (Presenter: Best Screenplay, Best Original Screenplay, and Best Original Motion Picture Story)
- Mervyn LeRoy (Presenter: Best Director)
- Hal B. Wallis (Presenter: Best Picture)
- Norma Shearer (Presenter: Irving G. Thalberg Memorial Award)
- Bob Hope (Presenter: Academy Juvenile Award)
- Charles Coburn (Presenter: Best Supporting Actor)
- Teresa Wright (Presenter: Best Supporting Actress)
- Gary Cooper (Presenter: Best Actor)
- Jennifer Jones (Presenter: Best Actress)

== Multiple nominations and awards ==
multiple nominations
Nominations	Film
10	Going My Way
10	Wilson
9	Since You Went Away
7	Double Indemnity
7	Gaslight
5	Cover Girl
5	Laura
4	Kismet
4	Meet Me in St. Louis
4	None but the Lonely Heart
3	The Adventures of Mark Twain
3	Brazil
3	Casanova Brown
3	Hollywood Canteen
3	Lady in the Dark
3	Lifeboat
2	Address Unknown
2	Dragon Seed
2	Higher and Higher
2	It Happened Tomorrow
2	Lady, Let's Dance
2	Minstrel Man
2	Mr. Skeffington
2	Mrs. Parkington
2	The Princess and the Pirate
2	Song of the Open Road
2	Thirty Seconds Over Tokyo
2	Up in Arms
2	Voice in the Wind

multiple awards
Awards	Film
7	Going My Way
5	Wilson
2	Gaslight

== See also ==
- 2nd Golden Globe Awards
- 1944 in film
