= New Americans =

New Americans can refer to:

- New Americans (film), a 1944 documentary film
- The New Americans, a 2004 seven-hour American documentary
- a generic term for immigrants to the United States
