= A Guy Named Joe =

1943 American film directed by Victor Fleming

- Theatrical release poster
- Directed by: Victor Fleming
- Screenplay by: Dalton Trumbo (screenplay); Frederick Hazlitt Brennan (adaptation)
- Story by: Chandler Sprague; David Boehm
- Produced by: Everett Riskin
- Starring: Spencer Tracy; Irene Dunne
- Cinematography: George J. Folsey; Karl Freund
- Edited by: Frank Sullivan
- Music by: Herbert Stothart; Alberto Colombo
- Production company: Metro-Goldwyn-Mayer
- Distributed by: Loew's Inc
- Release dates: December 23, 1943 (New York); March 10, 1944 (United States); March 16, 1944 (Los Angeles)
- Running time: 122 minutes
- Country: United States
- Language: English
- Budget: $2,627,000
- Box office: $5,363,000

A Guy Named Joe is a 1943 American supernatural romantic drama film directed by Victor Fleming. The film was produced by Everett Riskin and stars Spencer Tracy, Irene Dunne and Van Johnson. The screenplay, written by Dalton Trumbo and Frederick Hazlitt Brennan, was adapted from a story by Chandler Sprague and David Boehm, for which they were nominated for an Academy Award for Best Writing, Original Story. The film follows dead World War II bomber pilot Pete Sandidge as he becomes the guardian angel of pilot Ted Randall, and helps him romance his old girlfriend.

The film was Johnson's first major role, and also the production during which he sustained serious head injuries in an automobile accident. It features the popular song "I'll Get By (As Long as I Have You)" by Fred Ahlert and Roy Turk, performed by Irene Dunne.

Despite the film's title, it contains no characters named Joe. The use of the generic name to symbolize any military pilot is attributed to military aviator Claire Lee Chennault.

Steven Spielberg's 1989 film Always is a remake of A Guy Named Joe and exchanges the World War II backdrop to one of aerial firefighting.

== Plot ==
Pete Sandidge is the reckless pilot of a North American B-25 Mitchell flying out of England during World War II. He is in love with Air Transport Auxiliary pilot Dorinda Durston, an American civilian pilot ferrying aircraft all over the United Kingdom. Pete's commanding officer "Nails" Kilpatrick first transfers Pete and his crew to a base in Scotland, then offers him a transfer back to the United States to be a flight instructor. Dorinda begs him to accept, and Pete agrees before embarking on one last mission with his best friend Al Yackey to spot a German aircraft carrier. (Note: The only German aircraft carrier was the Graf Zeppelin; keel laid December 26, 1936, launched in 1938, but not completed and never put into service.) Wounded after an attack by an enemy fighter, Pete orders his crew to parachute from the plane before he bombs the carrier and crashes into the sea.

Pete finds himself walking in clouds, where he first recognizes old friend Dick Rumney. Pete is uneasy as he remembers that Dick had been killed in a fiery crash. Dick ushers him to a meeting with "The General", who gives him an assignment. Pete is to be returned to Earth, where a year has elapsed, to convey his experience and knowledge to Lockheed P-38 Lightning fighter pilot Ted Randall at a flight school in the South Pacific. Ted's commanding officer is Al Yackey. Ted meets Dorinda, now a ferry pilot with the Women Airforce Service Pilots in New Guinea. (Note: No WASPs flew outside the continental United States during World War II.) They gradually fall in love, and Ted proposes marriage. She accepts, much to Pete's jealous dismay. When Dorinda learns from Al that Ted has been given an extremely dangerous assignment to destroy the largest Japanese ammunition dump in the Pacific, she steals his aircraft. Pete guides her to the successful completion of the mission. Pete accepts fate and knows that his job is done.

== Cast ==
- Spencer Tracy as Pete Sandidge
- Irene Dunne as Dorinda Durston
- Van Johnson as Ted Randall
- Ward Bond as Al Yackey
- James Gleason as "Nails" Kilpatrick
- Lionel Barrymore as The General
- Barry Nelson as Dick Rumney
- Esther Williams as Ellen Bright, a USO hostess
- Henry O'Neill as Colonel Sykes
- Don DeFore as James J. Rourke (as Don De Fore)
- Charles Smith as Sanderson
- Addison Richards as Major Corbett
- Kirk Alyn as Officer in Heaven (uncredited)
- Maurice Murphy as Capt. Robertson (uncredited)

== Production ==
A Guy Named Joe introduced Van Johnson in his first major role. During filming in 1943, Johnson was seriously injured in an automobile accident. The crash lacerated his forehead and damaged his skull so severely that doctors inserted a plate in his head. Johnson also underwent brain surgery. MGM wanted to replace Johnson, but Tracy convinced the studio to suspend filming until Johnson could return to work, which he did after four months of recovery at the home of Keenan Wynn. Because the film was shot before and after the accident, Johnson is seen in the film with and without the forehead scars that he bore for the rest of his life.

During Johnson's period of recovery, Tracy recorded broadcasts for Armed Forces Radio and visited hospitals along the California coast and occasionally appearing at the Hollywood Canteen. Irene Dunne was required to begin work on the MGM film The White Cliffs of Dover, so she performed in both films concurrently after Johnson returned.

Budget restrictions precluded location shooting, and all the flying scenes were staged at the MGM studios. Footage shot at various United States Army Air Forces (USAAF) bases was incorporated using an exterior backdrop process. Authentic aircraft were used, although they remained on the ground. The pivotal scene with Dunne flying a Lockheed P-38 Lightning was recreated at Drew Field, Florida utilizing a surplus USAAF P-38E from a base in Omaha, where it had been used for instructional purposes. Electric motors drove the propellers. The miniature work was performed by the MGM special-effects team of A. Arnold Gillespie, Donald Jahrus and Warren Newcombe that later worked on Thirty Seconds Over Tokyo (1944)—which also co-starred Johnson and Tracy.

During the scene in which Tracy's character is killed, he is shown launching a suicidal divebomb run on a German aircraft carrier, but Germany never had an operational aircraft carrier in service during the war. This scene was reportedly initially opposed by the War Department as it conflicted with American war propaganda regarding Japanese kamikaze pilots.

The Production Code Administration objected to the film's ending, which originally depicted Dunne’s character crashing after bombing an enemy ammunition dump, thereby reuniting her with Pete. The censors felt that this represented a willful act of suicide, which, under the Production Code, could never be “justified, or glorified, or used specifically to defeat the ends of justice.” Dunne was recalled from Mexico City to film a revised ending in which she is reunited with Johnson's character.

=== Aircraft used in the film ===
- Lockheed P-38E Lightning fighter ("static", propellers turned by electric motors)
- North American B-25 Mitchell bomber (special effects scale model)
- Vultee BT-13 Valiant trainer (static but airworthy aircraft on loan from Luke Field, Arizona)
- North American P-51A Mustangs as Luftwaffe fighters
- Martin B-26 Marauders as Japanese bombers
- North American AT-6 Texan trainers at Luke Field
- C-36 or C-40 in some scenes, C-47 and C-60 in others

== Release ==
Because MGM was unable to find a Los Angeles-area theater in which to show A Guy Named Joe by the end of 1943, it was ineligible for that year's Academy Awards. It finally opened at Grauman's Chinese Theatre and several other area locations on March 16, 1944.

The film finished among the top-grossing films of 1944. According to MGM records, the film earned $3,970,000 in the U.S. and Canada and $1,393,000 overseas, resulting in a profit of $1,066,000.

== Reception ==
Rotten Tomatoes gave it a rating of 60% based on five reviews.

In a contemporary review for The New York Times, critic Bosley Crowther wrote:

The people at Metro-Goldwyn-Mayer had a dandy idea by the tail when they set out to make the picture ... The idea had blithesome implications, as well as spiritual ones, and it looked for a while as though Metro and its people were going to play it well. But somehow, as often happens, they yanked it around too much; they let it go slack at the wrong spot and then jerked up on it too hard. And the consequence was that the fleet thing got completely away from them. The last we saw of it, it was heading for the horizon like a bat out of—well! Too bad—because, at one point in there we'd have sworn it was going to be great.

Critic Philip K. Scheuer of the Los Angeles Times called the film "one of the season's more distinctive films" and wrote:

"A Guy Named Joe" ... almost meets the dictionary definition of tragicomedy—a blend of tragic and comic elements. It is not entirely successful because the blend is not perfect; a hyphen remains between "tragic" and "comic." The hyphen is invisible, even intangible but it is there. It is the split between life and death. ... It owes most, I think, to the wise, humorous and many-faceted performance given by Spencer Tracy, and also to some beautiful writing by Dalton Trumbo."

In The Nation in 1944, critic James Agee wrote:

In bare outline and idea this story offers a good workable metaphor for tradition in an art of skill, and wonderful possibilities for drama. ... But to make such a film—above all at such a time as this—would require extraordinary taste, honesty, and courage. The makers of A Guy Named Joe had courage, if a moral idiot has it; I doubt whether taste and honesty enter into it at all. I can hardly conceive of a picture more stonily impious. Joe's affability in the afterlife is enough to discredit the very idea that death in combat amounts to anything more than getting a freshly pressed uniform ... The people who have the best right to picket God on this matter, or at least Metro-Goldwyn-Mayer, are the dead whom the film is supposed to honor; failing that, widows, and the surviving pupils and lovers, can hardly make adequate protest.

== Awards ==
The team of David Boehm and Chandler Sprague were nominated for the Academy Award for Best Story in 1944, which was won by Leo McCarey for Going My Way.

== See also ==
- List of films about angels
- Always (1989)

== Bibliography ==
- Breyer, Siegfried. The German Aircraft Carrier Graf Zeppelin. Atglen, Pennsylvania: Schiffer Publishing Ltd., 1989. ISBN 978-0-9564790-0-6.
- Dolan Edward F. Jr. Hollywood Goes to War. London: Bison Books, 1985. ISBN 0-86124-229-7.
- Hardwick, Jack and Ed Schnepf. "A Viewer's Guide to Aviation Movies." The Making of the Great Aviation Films. General Aviation Series, Volume 2, 1989.
- Orriss, Bruce. When Hollywood Ruled the Skies: The Aviation Film Classics of World War II. Hawthorn, California: Aero Associates Inc., 1984. ISBN 0-9613088-0-X.
