= Gaslight (1944 film) =

1944 American film by George Cukor

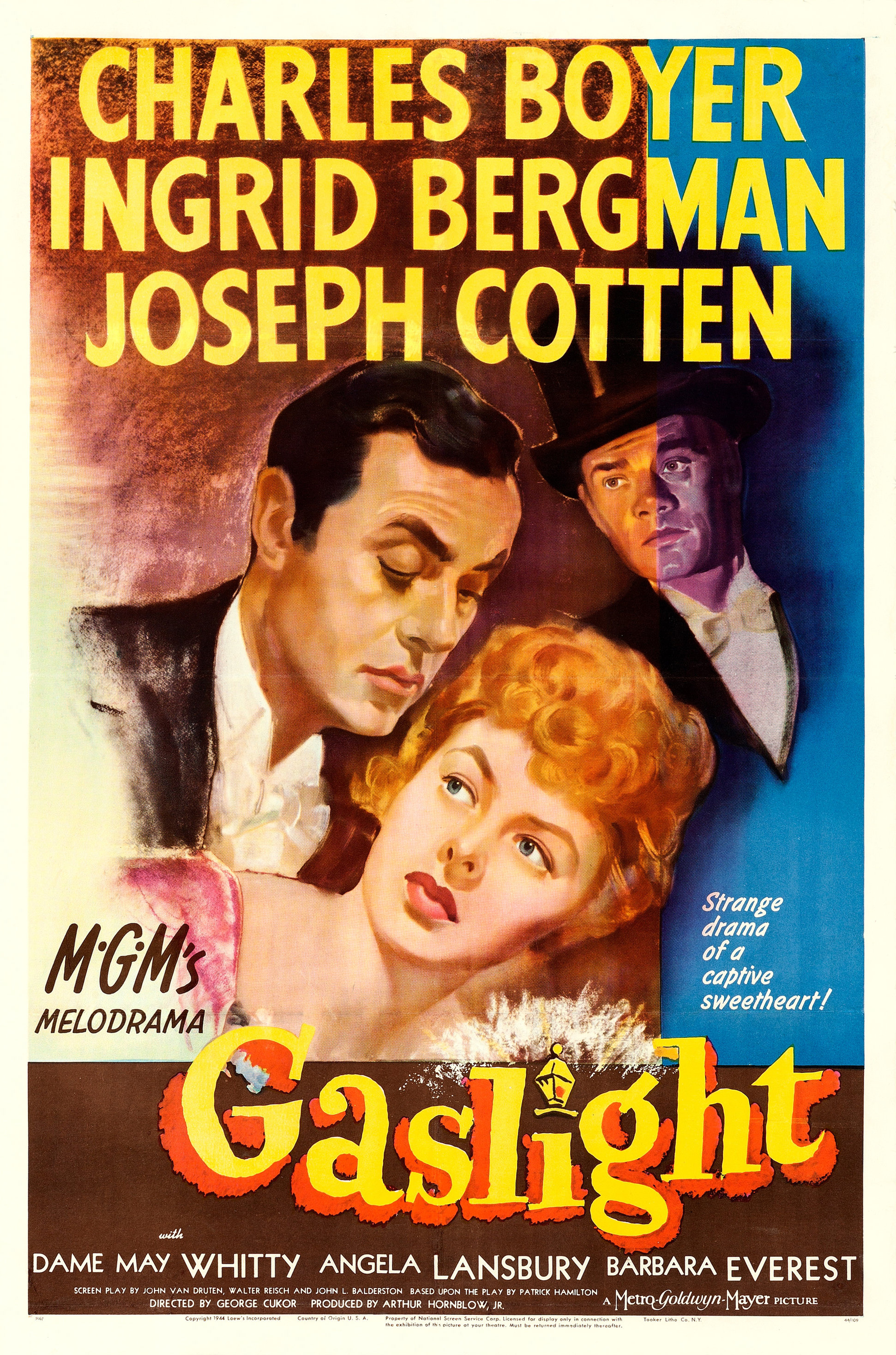
- Theatrical release poster
- Directed by: George Cukor
- Screenplay by: John Van Druten; Walter Reisch; John L. Balderston
- Based on: Gas Light; 1938 play by Patrick Hamilton
- Produced by: Arthur Hornblow Jr.
- Starring: Charles Boyer; Ingrid Bergman; Joseph Cotten; May Whitty; Angela Lansbury; Barbara Everest
- Cinematography: Joseph Ruttenberg
- Edited by: Ralph E. Winters
- Music by: Bronisław Kaper
- Production company: Metro-Goldwyn-Mayer
- Distributed by: Loew's, Inc.
- Release date: May 4, 1944
- Running time: 114 minutes
- Country: United States
- Language: English
- Budget: $2 million
- Box office: $4.6 million

Gaslight is a 1944 American psychological thriller film directed by George Cukor, and starring Charles Boyer, Ingrid Bergman, Joseph Cotten and Angela Lansbury in her film debut. Adapted by John Van Druten, Walter Reisch, and John L. Balderston from Patrick Hamilton's play Gas Light (1938), it follows a young woman whose husband slowly manipulates her into believing that she is descending into insanity.

This is a remake of the 1940 British film Gaslight directed by Thorold Dickinson, which is supposedly adapted from an unreleased 1912 Norwegian film titled The Gaslight Story by an unidentified director. It has a larger scale and budget, and lends a different ambiance to the material. To avoid confusion with the first film, Cukor's version was originally titled The Murder in Thornton Square in the UK. The film features numerous deviations from the original stage play, though the central drama remains that of a husband trying to drive his wife insane in order to distract her from his criminal activities.

Gaslight was released theatrically on May 4, 1944, by Metro-Goldwyn-Mayer to critical acclaim, and received seven nominations for the 17th Academy Awards, including for Best Picture, winning two: Best Actress (for Bergman); Best Production Design. In 2019, the film was selected for preservation in the United States National Film Registry by the Library of Congress as being "culturally, historically, or aesthetically significant".

== Plot ==
In 1875, after world-famous opera singer Alice Alquist is murdered at her home in Victorian London, her orphan niece Paula is sent to Italy, eventually studying opera to follow in Alice's footsteps. During her voice lessons, Paula is charmed by and marries her accompanist, Gregory Anton, after a two-week whirlwind romance. They settle in London, where Paula has inherited her late aunt's long-vacant townhouse. Paula grapples with the memory of her aunt's murder, and Gregory suggests storing Alice's furnishings in the attic.

When Paula finds a letter to her aunt from a man named Sergis Bauer, Gregory reacts violently but apologizes. He hires a young maid, Nancy, insisting that she take instructions from him instead of his "high-strung" wife. Paula is perplexed when Gregory begins to chide her supposed forgetfulness. On a visit to the Tower of London, she cannot find an heirloom brooch he gave her, although he stored it safely in her handbag. Gregory then begins to berate her for denying that she removed paintings from the wall, hiding them in odd corners of the house. Disturbed by noises coming from the boarded-up attic when Gregory is not home, Paula notices the gaslights also dim for no apparent reason.

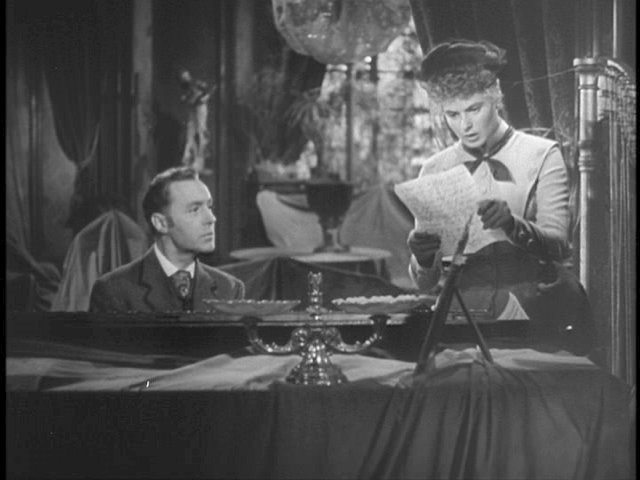
With Gregory looking on, Paula discovers the letter from Sergis Bauer.

Gregory brazenly flirts with Nancy, whose open disrespect worsens Paula’s nerves. Paula's anxious behavior is noticed by Inspector Brian Cameron of Scotland Yard, a childhood admirer of Alice. Struck by Paula's resemblance to her aunt, Cameron attempts to reopen the cold case, discovering that Alice owned precious royal jewels that were not recovered after Alice's murder.

Isolating his wife from the world, Gregory convinces her that she is unstable and a kleptomaniac, too unwell to be in public. When Paula insists on attending a recital hosted by an old family friend, Gregory accuses Paula of stealing his pocket watch during the event. When he "finds" it in her handbag, Paula becomes hysterical in front of the guests, who include Cameron. Taking Paula home, Gregory angrily claims that her mother died in an asylum, and that the letter she discovered from Sergis Bauer never existed. Doubting her own sanity, Paula breaks down.

Meanwhile, Cameron has recruited a patrolman to watch Gregory, who often visits an abandoned adjoining house; flirting with Nancy, the policeman learns that Gregory is planning to institutionalize Paula. While Gregory is out, Cameron offers Paula his help, confirming that the attic noises and flickering gaslights are real. He deduces that Gregory has been entering his own attic through a skylight via the adjoining vacant house to search furtively through Alice's belongings for her hidden jewels. When Gregory lights the attic lights, the gas is reduced to the downstairs lights. Cameron pries open Gregory's desk, and Paula finds the letter from Bauer that her husband insisted was a delusion. Cameron expresses that Gregory is systematically driving her into madness. "Gregory" is actually Sergis Bauer, who murdered Alice but was interrupted by a young Paula before he could find her jewels. His marriage to Paula was a scheme to gain access to her aunt's home, followed by a strategy to have Paula institutionalized, gaining full access to Alice's estate.

Simultaneously, Sergis discovers Alice's jewels hidden in plain sight, sewn into one of Alice's famous costumes. Returning downstairs, he finds his desk unlocked. He questions the mentally exhausted Paula, who admits the desk was opened by a man that was visiting her. To protect Paula, the kindly cook, Elizabeth, denies seeing any man and assures Sergis that this was merely a figment of Paula's imagination, driving Paula to despair. Cameron appears and confronts Sergis, chasing him into the attic and tying him to a chair. Finally convinced of her own sanity, Paula consents to Sergis’s request to be left alone with him, where Sergis urges Paula to cut him free. Paula taunts him, searching his desk for an imaginary knife to cut him free, and instead finding the "missing" brooch. As the police drive Sergis away, Cameron expresses interest in seeing Paula again.

== Cast ==
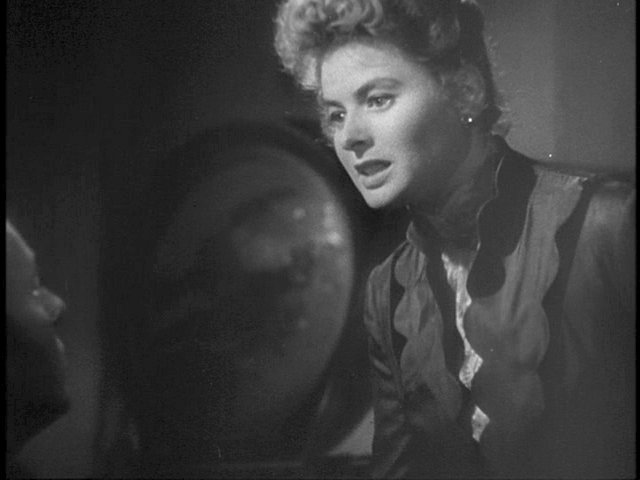
Gregory and Paula have a final confrontation.

- Charles Boyer as Gregory Anton/Sergis Bauer
- Ingrid Bergman as Paula Alquist Anton
  - Terry Moore as 14-year-old Paula (uncredited)
- Joseph Cotten as Brian Cameron
- Dame May Whitty as Miss Bessie Thwaites
- Angela Lansbury as Nancy Oliver, in her first film role
- Barbara Everest as Elizabeth Tompkins
- Emil Rameau as Maestro Guardi
- Edmund Breon as General Huddleston, Brian's supervisor
- Halliwell Hobbes as Mr. Mufflin, Paula's lawyer
- Tom Stevenson as Constable Williams
- Heather Thatcher as Lady Mildred Dalroy
- Lawrence Grossmith as Lord Freddie Dalroy (the last film role before his death)
- Jakob Gimpel as pianist

Uncredited

- Lassie Lou Ahern as young girl
- Arthur Blake as butler
- Leonard Carey as tour guide in Tower of London
- Alec Craig as Turnkey
- Gibson Gowland as servant
- Gary Gray as boy in park with nanny
- Joy Harington as Miss Laura Pritchard
- Syd Saylor as baggage clerk
- Morgan Wallace as Fred Garrett
- Helen Flint as Franchette

== Production ==
Encouraged by the success of the play and the British 1940 film, Metro-Goldwyn-Mayer bought the remake rights, but with a clause insisting that all existing prints of the first film be destroyed, even to the point of trying to destroy the negative. Evidently that order was not honored to the letter, since the 1940 Gaslight remains available for theatrical exhibition, television screenings, and DVD release.

== In popular culture ==
The film's title has become used as a verb. Gaslighting has come to mean manipulating a person or a group of people into questioning their own sanity or reality, in a way similar to the way the protagonist in the film was manipulated.

== Reception ==
=== Box office ===
According to MGM records, the film earned $2,263,000 in the US and Canada and $2,350,000 in other markets resulting in a profit of $941,000 (equivalent to about $17,200,000 in 2025).

=== Critical response ===
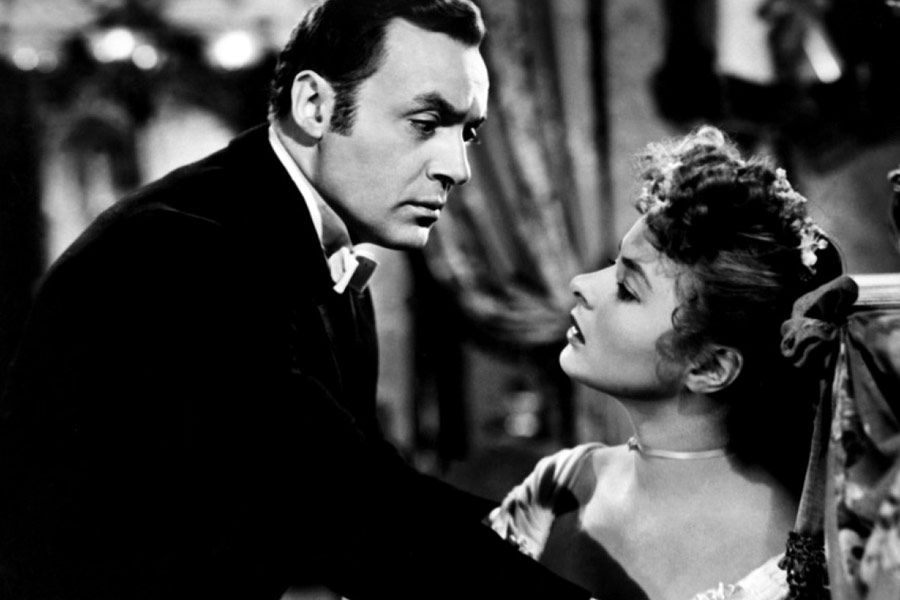
Charles Boyer and Ingrid Bergman

Critics generally consider the American remake to also be a classic. Bergman's Oscar-winning performance has long been considered among the greatest of all time, while Boyer's portrayal of Gregory was also Oscar nominated. The New York Times film critic Bosley Crowther praised the actors. He wrote, "And with Mr. Boyer doing the driving in his best dead-pan hypnotic style, while the flames flicker strangely in the gas-jets and the mood music bongs with heavy threats, it is no wonder that Miss Bergman goes to pieces in a most distressing way. Both of these popular performers play their roles right to the hilt. Nice little personality vignettes are interestingly contributed, too, by Joseph Cotten as a stubborn detective, Dame May Whitty and Angela Lansbury as a maid."

Film critic Manny Farber, writing in The New Republic registered this appraisal of Bergman's performance:

A lot of the credit for the quality of [the picture] is due to Miss Bergman, who is able to strike variations of hysteria, perplexity or love that make actually static episodes seem adequately flexible and meaningful…she is one of the few actresses who are expected—and allowed—to do this in films. Her acting zeal and ability sometimes run her on unnecessarily…but she gives a nice rendition of an unwary and unworldly woman being hurt and bewildered, and her more notorious ability to portray the most adoring and lovely of wives makes the nature of the tragedy and cruelty seem even more extreme.

On Rotten Tomatoes the film has an approval rating of 94% based on reviews from 86 critics. The consensus summarizes: "George Cukor's invigorated screen adaptation of the Angel Street play comes to life through Ingrid Bergman's suspenseful standoff against the uncannily evil Charles Boyer to thrilling yet melodramatic effect." On Metacritic, the film has a weighted average score of 78 out of 100 based on 13 critics, which the site labels as "generally favorable" reviews.

=== Noir analysis ===
In 2006, film critic Emanuel Levy discussed the film noir aspects of the film:

A thriller soaked in paranoia, Gaslight is a period films [sic] noir that, like Hitchcock's The Lodger and Hangover Square, is set in the Edwardian age. It's interesting to speculate about the prominence of a film cycle in the 1940s that can be described as 'Don't Trust Your Husband'. It began with three Hitchcock films: Rebecca (1940), Suspicion (1941), and Shadow of a Doubt (1943), and continued with Gaslight and Jane Eyre (both in 1944), Dragonwyck (1945), Notorious and The Spiral Staircase (both 1946), The Two Mrs. Carrolls (1947), and Sorry, Wrong Number and Sleep, My Love (both 1948). All of these films use the noir visual vocabulary and share the same premise and narrative structure: The life of a rich, sheltered woman is threatened by an older, deranged man, often her husband. In all of them, the house, usually a symbol of sheltered security in Hollywood movies, becomes a trap of terror.

=== Accolades ===
Award	Category	Nominee(s)	Result	Ref.
Academy Awards	Best Motion Picture	Metro-Goldwyn-Mayer	Nominated	
Academy Awards	Best Actor	Charles Boyer	Nominated	
Academy Awards	Best Actress	Ingrid Bergman	Won	
Academy Awards	Best Supporting Actress	Angela Lansbury	Nominated	
Academy Awards	Best Screenplay	John L. Balderston, Walter Reisch, and John Van Druten	Nominated	
Academy Awards	Best Art Direction – Black-and-White	Art Direction: Cedric Gibbons and William Ferrari; Interior Decoration: Paul Huldschinsky and Edwin B. Willis	Won	
Academy Awards	Best Cinematography – Black-and-White	Joseph Ruttenberg	Nominated	
Cannes Film Festival	Grand Prize of the Festival	George Cukor	Nominated	
Golden Globe Awards	Best Actress in a Motion Picture – Drama	Ingrid Bergman	Won	
National Board of Review Awards	Best Acting	Ingrid Bergman	Won	
National Film Preservation Board	National Film Registry		Inducted	
New York Film Critics Circle Awards	Best Actress	Ingrid Bergman	Nominated	
Online Film & Television Association Awards	Film Hall of Fame: Productions		Inducted	

The film is recognized by the American Film Institute as #78 on AFI's 100 Years...100 Thrills.

== See also ==
- List of American films of 1944
- Gothic romance film
- Gaslighting
