= Young woman in mourning dress reading a letter =

Painting by Gerard ter Borch

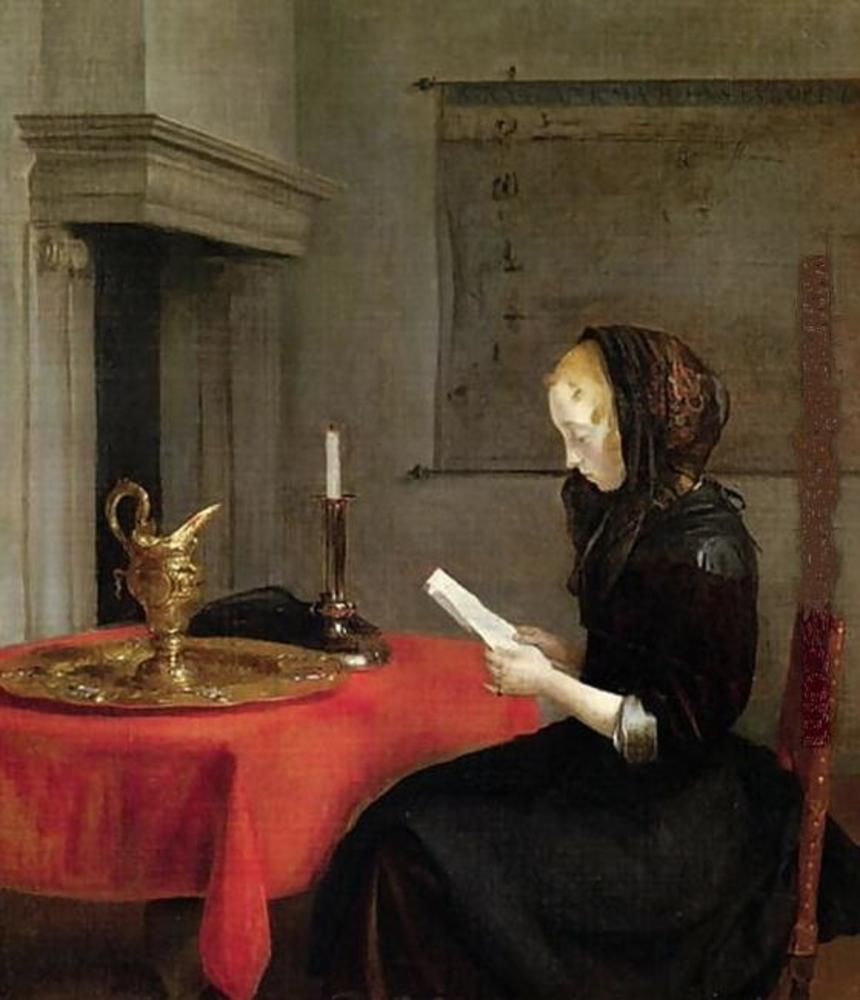
- Artist: Gerard ter Borch
- Year: 1662
- Medium: Oil on canvas
- Dimensions: 44 cm × 39 cm (17 in × 15 in)
- Location: private collection, New York

Young woman in mourning dress reading a letter is an oil on canvas painting by the Dutch artist Gerard ter Borch, created in 1662.

== Description ==
A young woman, dressed in black, is reading a letter. Her complexion is pale, and the only jewelry she wears is a sapphire ring. The background of the painting suggests opulence, with luxury tableware, a pilaster fireplace, a wall map surrounding her.

This is a genre piece capturing an intimate moment of reflection and sorrow

The motif of the letter, the delicate lighting of the female figure, and the peaceful, intimate atmosphere blend together perfectly.

== History ==
The painting was acquired by Oscar Huldschinsky, a businessman and patron of the arts, who was ruined by the Depression and sold at auction in 1928. It was subsequently sent to Brazil.

Since 1966, it has been held by the Aurora Trust, an art institute in New York.
