= Ray Cory =

American cinematographer (1894–1968)

- Born: March 30, 1894; Yakima, Washington, United States
- Died: March 15, 1968 (aged 73); Los Angeles, California, United States
- Occupation: Cinematographer
- Years active: 1944-1961

Ray Cory (March 30, 1894 – March 15, 1968) was an American cinematographer. He was nominated for an Academy Award for Best Special Effects at the 17th Academy Awards for work on the film Secret Command.

== Selected filmography ==
- Assignment – Paris! (1952)
- Last of the Comanches (1953)
- Flame of Calcutta (1953)
