= National Board of Review Awards 1944 =

Annual US film awards ceremony

16th National Board of Review Awards

December 23, 1944

The 16th National Board of Review Awards were announced on 23 December 1944.

== Best English Language Films ==
1. None But the Lonely Heart
2. Going My Way
3. The Miracle of Morgan's Creek
4. Hail the Conquering Hero
5. The Song of Bernadette
6. Wilson
7. Meet Me in St. Louis
8. Thirty Seconds over Tokyo
9. Thunder Rock
10. Lifeboat

== Winners ==
- Best English Language Film: None But the Lonely Heart
- Best Documentary: Memphis Belle: A Story of a Flying Fortress
- Best Acting:
  - Ethel Barrymore - None But the Lonely Heart
  - Ingrid Bergman - Gaslight
  - Humphrey Bogart - To Have and Have Not
  - Eddie Bracken - Hail the Conquering Hero
  - Bing Crosby - Going My Way
  - June Duprez - None But the Lonely Heart
  - Betty Hutton - The Miracle of Morgan's Creek
  - Margaret O'Brien - Meet Me In St. Louis
  - Franklin Pangborn - Hail the Conquering Hero
