= Russell Malmgren =

American sound engineer

- Born: April 16, 1905; Chicago, Illinois, United States
- Died: October 1982 (aged 77); Los Angeles, California, United States
- Occupation: Sound engineer
- Years active: 1930–1965

Russell Malmgren (April 16, 1905 – October 1982) was an American sound engineer. He was nominated for an Academy Award for Best Special Effects at the 17th Academy Awards for work on the film Secret Command. He worked on more than 50 films during his career.
