= Harry Kusnick =

American sound engineer

- Born: 6 January 1908; Pueblo, Colorado
- Occupation: Sound engineer
- Years active: 1935-1948

Harry Kusnick (born 6 January 1908) was an American sound engineer. He was nominated for an Academy Award for Best Special Effects at the 17th Academy Awards (1945) for work on the film Secret Command.

Kusnick was born in Pueblo, Colorado to Russian Jews who had emigrated in 1906. His father, Isaac, was a jeweler.
