= Robert Wright (special effects artist) =

American special effects artist

- Occupation: Special effects artist
- Years active: 1944

Robert Wright was an American special effects artist. He was nominated for an Academy Award for Best Special Effects at the 17th Academy Awards for work on the film Secret Command.
