= Olga Fabian =

Austrian-born American actress (1885–1983)

Olga Fabian (September 15, 1885 - December 1983) was an Austrian-born American actress. During her career she appeared in "virtually every feminine role in Shakespeare's catalog, most of Molnar and Ibsen".

Born in Vienna, Fabian was the daughter of wine dealer Carl Fuchs. Her father discouraged her desires to be an actress but eventually, after being persuaded by her mother and her teacher, he allowed her to study dramatics at the State Academy in Vienna. Following her graduation, she acted for six years with the Royal Theater.

Before she came to the United States, Fabian was popular in Germany, and she originated the role of Julie in Liliom, by Molnar. She had leading roles in productions of Shakespeare's plays, and she was a guest star in a variety of cities, including Berlin, Dresden, and Hamburg. In 1939, Adolf Hitler's rise to power in Germany led her to move to Switzerland, but as the Nazi influence grew closer, she and her 14-year-old son came to the United States, where she eventually became a citizen. Sponsorship by unknown cousins in Chicago enabled them to immigrate, and they arrived with $30. Quaker friends helped Fabian's son to begin his American education. She had "a schoolbook knowledge of the English language" when she arrived in America.

Fabian's American stage debut occurred in Play with Fire. Broadway plays in which she appeared included The Big Two (1947), Come Back, Little Sheba (1950), I Am a Camera (1951), The Genius and the Goddess (1957), and The Warm Peninsula (1959). I Am a Camera, in which Fabian toured the United States in addition to being in the Broadway production, had her portraying Frau Schneider, a Nazi part that "demands 100 per cent acting from a woman who hates everything this Nazi-loving woman is."

Fabian's films included Voice in the Wind (1944), Behind Prison Walls (1943), My Pal Wolfe, They Live in Fear (1944), Voice in the Wind (1944), and Her Highness and the Bellboy (1945).

Fabian's television debut came on Circle Theater in 1950, and she portrayed Mrs. Bloom in The Goldbergs in 1953. Other TV shows on which she appeared included The Philco Television Playhouse, Omnibus, Campbell Soundstage, You Are There, Colonel Humphrey Flack, You'll Never Get Rich, Robert Montgomery Presents, The World of Mr. Sweeney, and Kraft Television Theatre.

Fabian also gave lectures and dramatic recitals for a variety of clubs and college groups, including lecturing in German about German poetry to Harvard's advanced language classes and speaking to groups at Bard College and Radcliffe College.

Fabian was married in 1925 and divorced in 1931.
