= Grand Slam (1933 film) =

1933 film

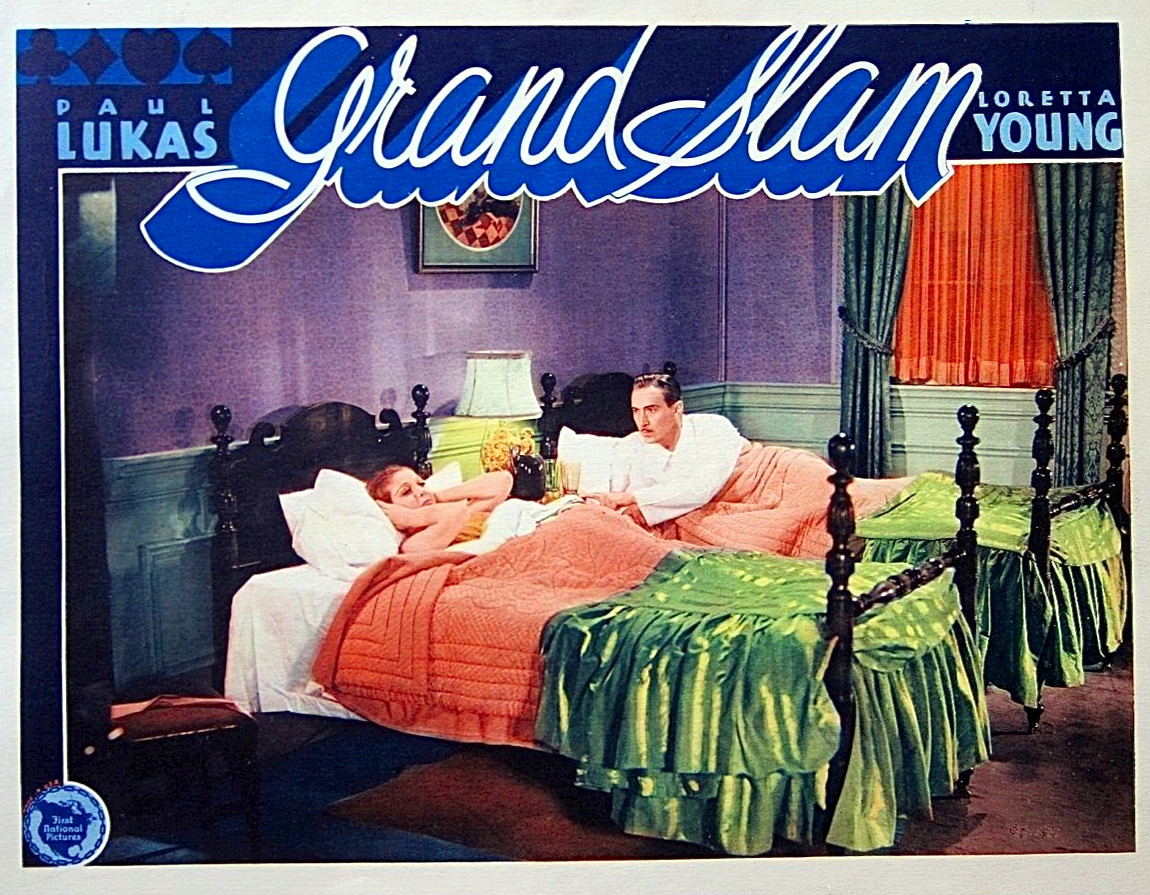
- Lobby card
- Directed by: William Dieterle; Alfred E. Green
- Screenplay by: Erwin S. Gelsey; David Boehm
- Based on: Grand Slam: The Rise and Fall of a Bridge Wizard; 1932 novel by Benjamin Russell Herts
- Produced by: Hal B. Wallis
- Starring: Paul Lukas; Loretta Young; Frank McHugh
- Cinematography: Sidney Hickox
- Edited by: Jack Killifer
- Music by: Bernhard Kaun
- Production company: First National Pictures
- Distributed by: Warner Bros. Pictures
- Release date: March 18, 1933
- Running time: 67 minutes
- Country: United States
- Language: English

Grand Slam is a 1933 American pre-Code comedy film directed by William Dieterle and Alfred E. Green and starring Paul Lukas, Loretta Young and Frank McHugh. The film was released by Warner Bros. Pictures on March 18, 1933.

== Plot ==
A waiter named Peter Stanislavsky learns the game of bridge as a favor to his new bride Marcia, whose entire family plays the game. When he luckily defeats bridge champion Cedric Van Dorn, Peter jokingly claims that he won because of the "Stanislavsky method", and soon becomes world-famous as a bridge expert.

Trouble ensues when Peter and Marcia form a team to play in bridge tournaments. Peter infuriates Marcia by questioning her play.

== Cast ==
- Paul Lukas as Peter Stanislavsky
- Loretta Young as Marcia Stanislavsky
- Frank McHugh as Philip 'Speed' McCann
- Glenda Farrell as Blondie
- Helen Vinson as Lola Starr
- Roscoe Karns as Contest Radio Announcer
- Ferdinand Gottschalk as Cedric Van Dorn
- Reginald Barlow as Theodore
- Walter Byron as Barney Starr
- Esther Howard as Mary
- William H. Strauss as Waiter

== Bibliography ==
- Bubbeo, Daniel. The Women of Warner Brothers: The Lives and Careers of 15 Leading Ladies, with Filmographies for Each. McFarland, 2001.
