= 2nd Golden Globe Awards =

Film award ceremony in 1945

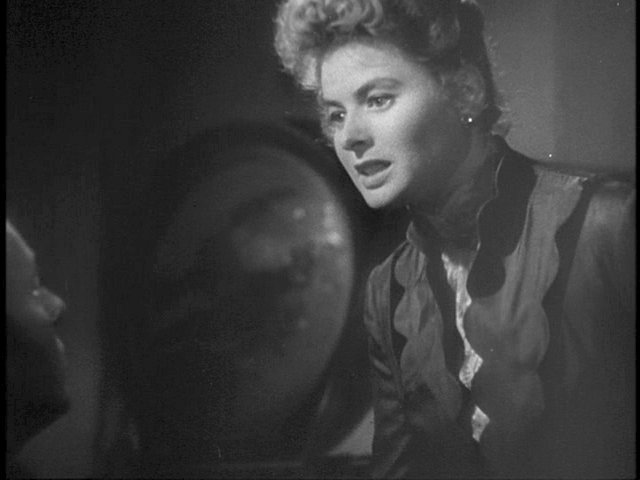
- Best Actress in a Leading Role winner Ingrid Bergman from Gaslight (1944).
- Awarded by: Hollywood Foreign Correspondents Association
- Announced on: February 1945
- Presented on: April 16, 1945
- Site: The Beverly Hills Hotel; Beverly Hills, California, U.S.

Highlights
- Best Picture: Going My Way
- Most awards: Going My Way (3)

The 2nd Golden Globe Awards, honoring the best achievements in 1944 filmmaking, were announced in February 1945 and held on April 16, 1945, at The Beverly Hills Hotel in Beverly Hills, California.

== Winners ==
The 2nd Golden Globe Awards were presented on April 16, 1945, during a dinner in the Terrace Room of The Beverly Hills Hotel in Beverly Hills, California. B.G. DeSylva accepted the Best Picture award.

=== Best Picture ===
- Going My Way directed by Leo McCarey

=== Best Actor in a Leading Role ===
- Alexander Knox – Wilson

=== Best Actress in a Leading Role ===
- Ingrid Bergman – Gaslight

=== Best Performance by an Actor in a Supporting Role in a Motion Picture ===
- Barry Fitzgerald – Going My Way

=== Best Performance by an Actress in a Supporting Role in a Motion Picture ===
- Agnes Moorehead – Mrs. Parkington

=== Best Director – Motion Picture ===
- Leo McCarey – Going My Way

== See also ==
- Hollywood Foreign Press Association
- 17th Academy Awards
- 1944 in film
