= Always (1989 film) =

1989 romantic drama film directed by Steven Spielberg

- Theatrical release poster by John Alvin
- Directed by: Steven Spielberg
- Screenplay by: Jerry Belson; Diane Thomas (uncredited)
- Based on: A Guy Named Joe by: Dalton Trumbo; Frederick Hazlitt Brennan; Chandler Sprague; David Boehm
- Produced by: Steven Spielberg; Kathleen Kennedy; Frank Marshall
- Starring: Richard Dreyfuss; Holly Hunter; John Goodman; Brad Johnson; Audrey Hepburn
- Cinematography: Mikael Salomon
- Edited by: Michael Kahn
- Music by: John Williams
- Production companies: United Artists; Amblin Entertainment
- Distributed by: Universal Pictures
- Release date: December 22, 1989
- Running time: 123 minutes
- Country: United States
- Language: English
- Budget: $31 million
- Box office: $74.1 million

Always is a 1989 American romantic fantasy film directed and produced by Steven Spielberg. It is a remake of the 1943 romantic drama A Guy Named Joe, which was set during World War II. The main departure from the 1943 film is changing the setting from wartime to a modern aerial firefighting operation. However, it follows the same basic plot line: the spirit of a recently dead expert pilot mentors a newer pilot, while watching him fall in love with the girlfriend he left behind.

The names of the four principal characters of the earlier film are all the same, except the Ted Randall character, who is called Ted Baker in the remake, and Pete's last name is Sandich instead of Sandidge. The film stars Richard Dreyfuss, Holly Hunter, John Goodman, Brad Johnson, and Audrey Hepburn in her final film role before her death in 1993. Always was released in the United States by Universal Pictures on December 22, 1989, and received mixed reviews. The film was a mild success, earning $74 million worldwide on the budget of $31 million.

== Plot ==
Pete Sandich is an aerial firefighter whose excessive risk-taking in the air deeply troubles his girlfriend, Dorinda Durston, a pilot who doubles as an air traffic controller for the firefighters. It also concerns Pete's best friend, Al Yackey, a fellow firefighter pilot.

After yet another risky and nearly fatal flight that Pete casually shrugs off, Al suggests he accept a safer job training firefighting pilots in Flat Rock, Colorado. He refuses until Dorinda tearfully confronts him, confessing her perpetual fear and anguish that he will be killed. Pete relents and tells her he will take the training job.

Pete flies one last mission, despite Dorinda's gloomy premonition. During the firebombing run, Al's engine catches fire and is about to explode. Pete makes a dangerously steep dive and skillfully douses Al's engine with a fire-retardant slurry, saving him. As Pete struggles to regain control from the dive, he flies directly through the forest fire, igniting his engine and causing the aircraft to explode.

Pete strolls through a burned-out forest. Coming to a small clearing, he meets Hap, who explains Pete died in the explosion and now has a new purpose: As spirits did for him during his lifetime, he will provide Spiritus ("the divine breath") to guide others who will interpret his words as their thoughts.

Although time is non-linear from Pete's perspective, six months have elapsed in the real world and Al wants a grieving Dorinda to move past Pete's death. He takes her with him to Colorado to work at the flight school where Pete is to lead pilots who will be training to fight fires, one of whom is Ted Baker. More months pass and, to Pete's anguish, Ted falls in love with Dorinda as she begins emerging from her year-long mourning. Pete attempts to sabotage the budding romance, but Hap reminds him that his life ended; he was sent to inspire Ted but also to bid Dorinda farewell.

Ted, with Pete's inspiration, plans a dangerous rescue mission for trapped firefighters. Unable to bear another loss, Dorinda takes his aircraft to do the job herself. Pete, unseen by Dorinda, fails to dissuade her. However, with Pete's guidance, she can save the firefighters who are trapped on the ground. On the return flight, Pete tells Dorinda everything he wanted to say in life.

Dorinda makes an emergency water landing in a lake. As the sinking plane's cockpit floods, she seems reluctant to escape. Pete appears before her and, offering his hand, leads her to the surface. As Dorinda wades ashore, Pete releases her from his heart, allowing Ted to be in her life. Emerging from the lake alone, Dorinda walks back to the airbase where she accepts Ted and embraces him. Pete appears, smiles, and walks in the opposite direction to assume his place in the afterlife.

== Cast ==
- Richard Dreyfuss as Pete Sandich
- Holly Hunter as Dorinda Durston
- John Goodman as Al Yackey
- Brad Johnson as Ted Baker
- Audrey Hepburn as Hap
- Roberts Blossom as Dave
- Keith David as Powerhouse
- Ed Van Nuys as Nails
- Marg Helgenberger as Rachel
- Dale Dye as Don

In addition, singer-songwriter JD Souther plays the pianist-singer at the dance near the start of the film.

== Production ==
Steven Spielberg confided that while making Jaws in 1974, he and Richard Dreyfuss had traded quips from A Guy Named Joe, considered a "classic" war film, that they both wanted to remake. Originally intended to be an MGM project, the film underwent a protracted 10-year gestation, with Tom Cruise reputedly being considered for the Ted Baker role. Dustin Hoffman was offered a role but turned it down.

Dreyfuss had seen the 1943 melodrama "at least 35 times." For Spielberg, who recalled seeing it as a child late at night, "it was one of the films that inspired him to become a movie director," creating an emotional connection to the times that his father, a wartime air force veteran had lived through. The two friends quoted individual shots from the film to each other and when the opportunity arose, years later, were resolved to recreate the wartime fantasy.

Principal photography began on May 15, 1989; production took place in northwestern Montana in the Kootenai National Forest, with some scenes filmed in and around Libby. Some 500 of its residents were recruited for the film as extras to act as wildland firefighters. The scenes where the plane flies over the lake at the beginning and lands in the lake at the end of the movie were filmed at Bull Lake, south of Troy. The scenes set in "Flat Rock, Colorado," were filmed at and around the Ephrata airport in eastern Washington. The scene where Pete and Hap are walking through the wheat field was filmed at Sprague, southwest of Spokane, where they spent two weeks filming in June. Footage of Yellowstone National Park's 1988 fires was used for the fire sequences. Production wrapped in August 1989.

Audrey Hepburn appeared in Always in her last film role. Her cameo was an opportunity to raise money for her favorite cause; much of Hepburn's one million dollars plus salary was donated to UNICEF.

=== Aircraft used ===
Two Douglas A-26 Invader fire bombers (Douglas B-26C Invader No.57] and Douglas TB-26C Invader No. 59) were prominently featured in Always. The flying for the film was performed by well-known film pilot Steve Hinton and Dennis Lynch, the owner of the A-26s. A combination of aerial photography, rear projection, and models was used to create the aerial sequences.

A number of other aircraft also appeared in Always: Aeronca 7AC Champion, Bellanca 8KCAB Super Decathlon, Beechcraft Model 18, Cessna 337 Super Skymaster, Cessna 340, Consolidated PBY-5A Catalina, de Havilland Canada DHC-6-300 Twin Otter, Douglas C-54 Skymaster, Fairchild C-119C Flying Boxcar, McDonnell Douglas DC-10 and North American B-25J Mitchell. Two helicopters were also seen: Bell 206 JetRanger and Bell UH-1B Iroquois.

== Reception ==
=== Box office ===
Always was released the same day as Tango & Cash and grossed $3.7 million in its opening weekend, finishing fifth behind Christmas Vacation, Tango & Cash, The War of the Roses, and Back to the Future Part II. It went on to gross $43.9 million in the U.S. and $30.3 million in foreign territories, for a worldwide total of $74.1 million.

=== Critical response ===
On Rotten Tomatoes the film holds an approval rating of 72% based on 29 reviews, with an average rating of 5.9/10. The website's critics consensus reads: "Its central romance takes occasional dives into excessive sentimentality, but Always otherwise flies high thanks to director Steven Spielberg's rousing feel for adventure." Metacritic assigned the film a weighted average score of 50 out of 100 based on 15 critics, indicating "mixed or average" reviews. Audiences polled by CinemaScore gave the film an average grade of "A−" on an A+ to F scale.

Roger Ebert of the Chicago Sun-Times considered it "dated" and more of a "curiosity," calling it Spielberg's "weakest film since his comedy 1941". Variety gave it a more generous review: "Always is a relatively small scale, engagingly casual, somewhat silly, but always entertaining fantasy."

== Accolades ==
Always was nominated in 1991 for the Saturn Award as Best Fantasy Film, while Jerry Belson was nominated for the Best Writing category of the award at the Academy of Science Fiction, Fantasy & Horror Films (USA). Several critics have now considered the film as the progenitor of a new crop of "ghost" genre films, including Ghost (1990).

== Soundtrack ==
- The character Pete Sandich, played by Richard Dreyfuss, whistles "Garryowen" and the theme to Leave It to Beaver.
- "Smoke Gets in Your Eyes," performed live in the film by JD Souther and played later on tape by The Platters, is what romantic couple Sandich and Durston refer to as "our song."
- The album was released in 1990 and featured tracks of the orchestral score of the film, composed and conducted by John Williams and performed by the Hollywood Studio Symphony. An expanded edition of Williams' score was released on June 22, 2021, through La-La-Land Records, which includes unreleased and unheard musical content.
- Also featured was Jimmy Buffett's "Boomerang Love."

== See also ==
- List of firefighting films
- List of films about angels

== Bibliography ==
- Crawley, Tony. The Steven Spielberg Story. New York: William Morrow, 1983. ISBN 0688025102.
- Dolan, Edward F. Jr. Hollywood Goes to War. London: Bison Books, 1985. ISBN 0861242297.
- Evans, Alun. Brassey's Guide to War Films. Dulles, Virginia: Potomac Books, 2000. ISBN 1574882635.
- Farmer, James H. "The Making of Always." Air Classics, Volume 26, No. 2, February 1990.
- Freer, Ian. The Complete Spielberg. New York: Virgin Books, 2001. ISBN 0753505568.
- Sinyard, Neil. The Films of Steven Spielberg. London: Bison Books, 1986. ISBN 0861243528.
- Walker, Alexander. Audrey: Her Real Story. London: Weidenfeld & Nicolson, 1997. ISBN 9780312180461.
- Woodward, Ian. Audrey Hepburn: Fair Lady of the Screen. London: Virgin Books, 2010. ISBN 9780863697418.
