= David Boehm =

American screenwriter

David Boehm (1 February 1893 in New York – 31 July 1962 in Santa Monica, California) was an American screenwriter.

He is best known for the 1944 World War II heavenly fantasy A Guy Named Joe (remade by Steven Spielberg in 1989 as Always), for which he received an Academy Award nomination. He also contributed scripts to Gold Diggers of 1933, Ex-Lady (1933), and Knickerbocker Holiday (1944).

== Selected filmography ==
- Grand Slam (1933)
