= Paul Huldschinsky =

Set decorator

- Born: 18 August 1889; Berlin, Germany
- Died: 1 February 1947 (aged 57); Santa Monica, California, United States
- Occupation: Set decorator
- Years active: 1940-1947

Paul Huldschinsky (18 August 1889 – 1 February 1947) was a German-Jewish architect and set decorator. After imprisonment in the Sachsenhausen concentration camp in 1938 he fled Nazi Germany in 1939 for California. He won an Oscar in the category Best Art Direction for the film Gaslight.

== Early life ==
Paul Huldschinky was born into a family of Jewish heritage known for its contributions to banking, German heavy industry and art. His father, Oscar Huldschinsky (1846–1931) was a Silesian steel magnate and noted art collector, listed among Berlin's wealthiest millionaires. His mother, Ida Huldschinsky (1860-1912 née Brandeis-Weikersheim) belonged to the Viennese banking family. Paul had three sisters, Susanne Huldschinsky Reichenheim, Marie Minze Friedheim et Lilly von Klemperer. They, as well as their families, would all be persecuted as Jews when the Nazis came to power.

== Selected filmography ==
- Gaslight (1944)

== See also ==
- List of German-speaking Academy Award winners and nominees
