= 1944 New York Film Critics Circle Awards =

10th New York Film Critics Circle Awards

10th New York Film Critics Circle Awards

(announced December 27, 1944)

Going My Way

The 10th New York Film Critics Circle Awards, announced on 27 December 1944, honored the best filmmaking of 1944.

== Winners ==
- Best Film:
  - Going My Way
- Best Actor:
  - Barry Fitzgerald - Going My Way
- Best Actress:
  - Tallulah Bankhead - Lifeboat
- Best Director:
  - Leo McCarey - Going My Way
