= Mac Dalgleish =

American sound engineer

- Born: June 12, 1901; California, United States
- Died: December 31, 1974 (aged 73); Los Angeles, California, United States
- Occupation: Sound engineer
- Years active: 1925 – 1957

Mckinley "Mac" Dalgleish (June 12, 1901 – December 31, 1974) was an American sound engineer. He was nominated for an Academy Award in the category Sound Recording for the film Voice in the Wind.

== Selected filmography ==
- Voice in the Wind (1944)
