= Going My Way =

1944 film by Leo McCarey

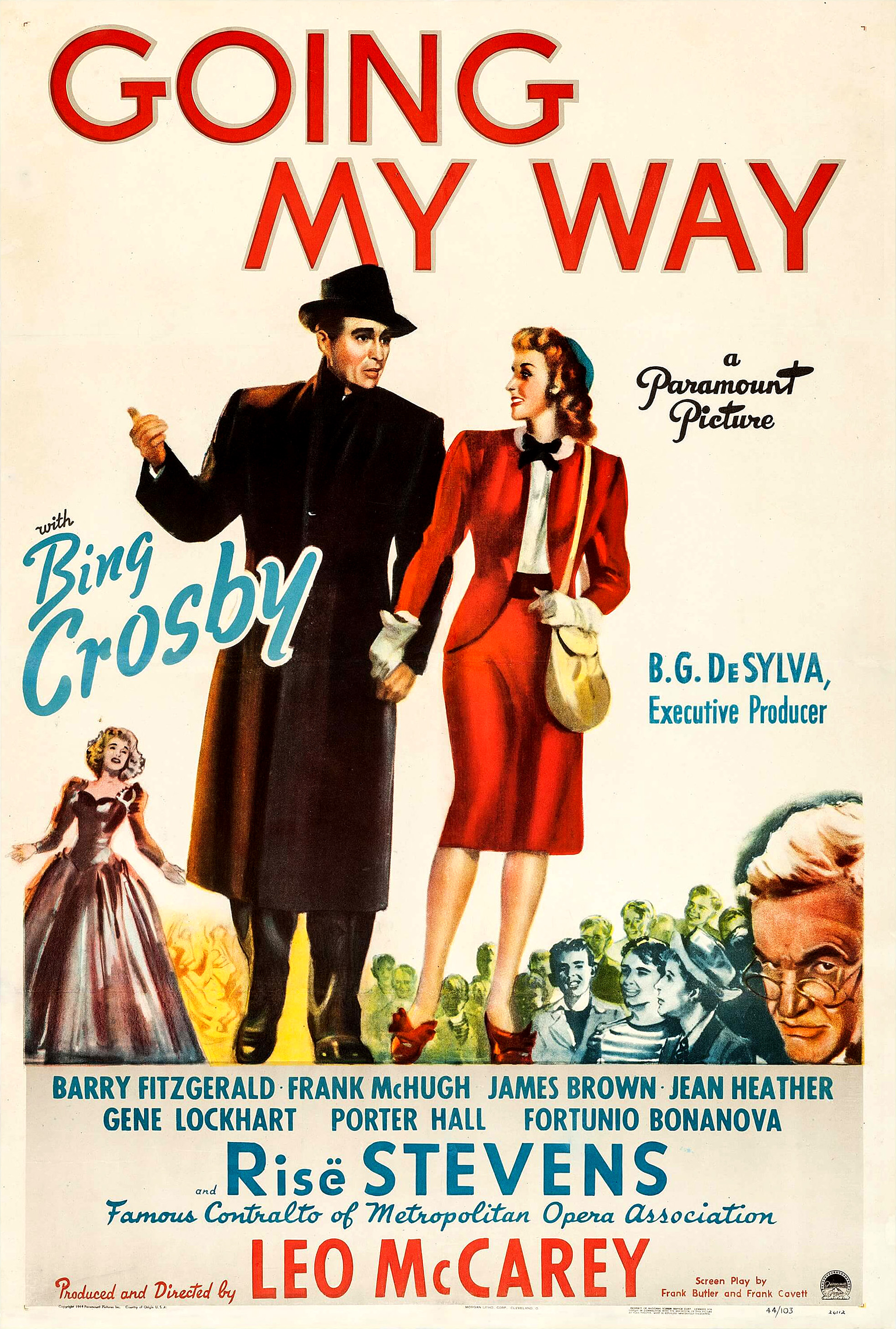
- Theatrical release poster (with executive producer B. G. DeSylva given prominent credit)
- Directed by: Leo McCarey
- Screenplay by: Frank Butler; Frank Cavett
- Story by: Leo McCarey
- Produced by: Leo McCarey
- Starring: Bing Crosby; Barry Fitzgerald; Frank McHugh; James Brown; Jean Heather; Gene Lockhart; Porter Hall; Fortunio Bonanova; Risë Stevens
- Cinematography: Lionel Lindon
- Edited by: LeRoy Stone
- Music by: Robert Emmett Dolan
- Distributed by: Paramount Pictures
- Release dates: May 3, 1944 (New York City, premiere); August 16, 1944 (Los Angeles)
- Running time: 126 minutes
- Country: United States
- Language: English
- Box office: $6.5 million (US/Canada rentals)

Going My Way is a 1944 American musical comedy drama film directed by Leo McCarey and starring Bing Crosby and Barry Fitzgerald. Written by Frank Butler and Frank Cavett, based on a story by McCarey, the film is about a new young priest taking over a parish from an established old veteran. Crosby sings five songs with other songs performed onscreen by Metropolitan Opera's star mezzo-soprano Risë Stevens and the Robert Mitchell Boys Choir. Going My Way was the highest-grossing picture of 1944, and was nominated for ten Academy Awards, winning seven, including Best Picture. Its success helped to make movie exhibitors choose Crosby as the biggest box-office draw of the year, a record he would hold for the remainder of the 1940s. After World War II, Crosby and McCarey presented a copy of the film to Pope Pius XII at the Vatican. Going My Way was followed the next year by a sequel, The Bells of St. Mary's.

In 2004, the film was selected for preservation in the United States National Film Registry by the Library of Congress as being "culturally, historically, or aesthetically significant".

== Plot ==
Father Charles "Chuck" O'Malley, an incoming priest from East St. Louis, is transferred to St. Dominic's Catholic Church in New York City.

On his first day, his unconventional style gets him into a series of mishaps; his informal appearance and casual attitude initially make a poor impression with the elder priest, Father Fitzgibbon. The very traditional Fitzgibbon is further put off by O'Malley's recreational habits – particularly his golf-playing – and his friendship with the even more casual Father Timmy O'Dowd. O'Dowd tricks O'Malley into revealing that he was actually sent by the bishop to replace Fitzgibbon and take charge of the parish's affairs, with Fitzgibbon remaining on as pastor. To spare Fitzgibbon's feelings, O'Malley pretends that he was sent to serve as the elderly priest's assistant.

The difference between O'Malley and Fitzgibbon's styles is openly apparent as they deal with events like a parishioner being evicted and a young woman named Carol James having run away from home. The most consequential difference arises in their handling of the church youth, many of whom consistently get into trouble with the law in a gang led by Tony Scaponi. Fitzgibbon is inclined to look the other way, siding with the boys because of their frequent church attendance. O'Malley wants to help the boys to improve their lives, befriending Scaponi and eventually convincing the boys to form a church choir.

The noise of the practicing choir annoys Fitzgibbon, who goes to the bishop and asks for O'Malley to be transferred to another parish. In the course of their conversation, Fitzgibbon realizes the bishop sent O'Malley to take charge of the parish. To avoid an uncomfortable situation, Fitzgibbon asks the bishop to put O'Malley in charge, and then, resigned to his fate, he informs O'Malley of his new role. Distressed, Fitzgibbon goes walking in a rainstorm for several hours and returns late that night. O'Malley puts the older priest to bed, and the two finally begin to bond. They discuss Fitzgibbon's long unfulfilled desire to go to Ireland to visit his mother, now over 90 years old. O'Malley puts Fitzgibbon to sleep with an Irish lullaby, "Too Ra Loo Ra Loo Ral".

O'Malley runs into Jenny Tuffel, an old girlfriend whom he left to join the priesthood. Jenny now has a successful career singing with the Metropolitan Opera, under the stage name Genevieve Linden. As she prepares to go onstage in a performance of Bizet's Carmen, the two discuss their past, and she learns that her world travels with a previous opera company caused her to miss O'Malley's letter explaining he had entered the priesthood.

O'Malley next pays a visit to Carol, now suspected of living in sin with Ted Haines Jr., the son of the church's mortgage holder. O'Malley describes to the young couple his calling in life, to follow the joyous side of religion and lead others to do the same, sung as his composition "Going My Way". When the junior Haines is later confronted by his father, the father discovers that he and Carol have married, and he has joined the Army Air Corps.

Jenny visits O'Malley at the church, sees the boys' choir, and reads the sheet music of "Going My Way". She, O'Malley, and O'Dowd devise a plan to rent out the Metropolitan Opera House, have the choir perform the song with a full orchestra, then sell the publishing rights, saving the church from its financial woes. When Max Dolan, the music executive brought on to hear the song, does not believe it will sell, the choir decides to make the most of its opportunity on the grand stage, and sings "Swinging on a Star". The executive overhears the song and wants to buy it, providing enough money to pay off the church's mortgage.

With everything settled, O'Malley is transferred to a new assignment; O'Dowd will be Fitzgibbon's new assistant, with Tony Scaponi in charge of the choir. However, the church is damaged by a massive fire. On Christmas Eve, parishioners gather in a temporary church for a Mass that also serves as O'Malley's farewell. As a parting gesture, O'Malley has sent for Fitzgibbon's mother in Ireland. As mother and son embrace for the first time in 45 years, the choir sings "Too-ra-loo-ra-loo-ral", as Father O'Malley quietly slips away into the night.

== Cast ==
- Bing Crosby as Father Chuck O'Malley
- Barry Fitzgerald as Father Fitzgibbon
- Frank McHugh as Father Timothy O'Dowd
- James Brown as Ted Haines Jr.
- Gene Lockhart as Ted Haines Sr.
- Jean Heather as Carol James
- Porter Hall as Mr. Belknap
- Fortunio Bonanova as Tomaso Bozanni
- Eily Malyon as Mrs. Carmody
- Robert Mitchell Boychoir as St. Dominic's Church Choir
- Risë Stevens as Genevieve Linden/Jenny Tuffel (credited as Famous Contralto of Metropolitan Opera Association)
- William Frawley as Max Dolan the music publisher (uncredited)
- Stanley Clements as Tony Scaponi (street tough and choir kid)
- Carl Switzer as Herman Langerhanke (street tough and choir kid)

== Production ==
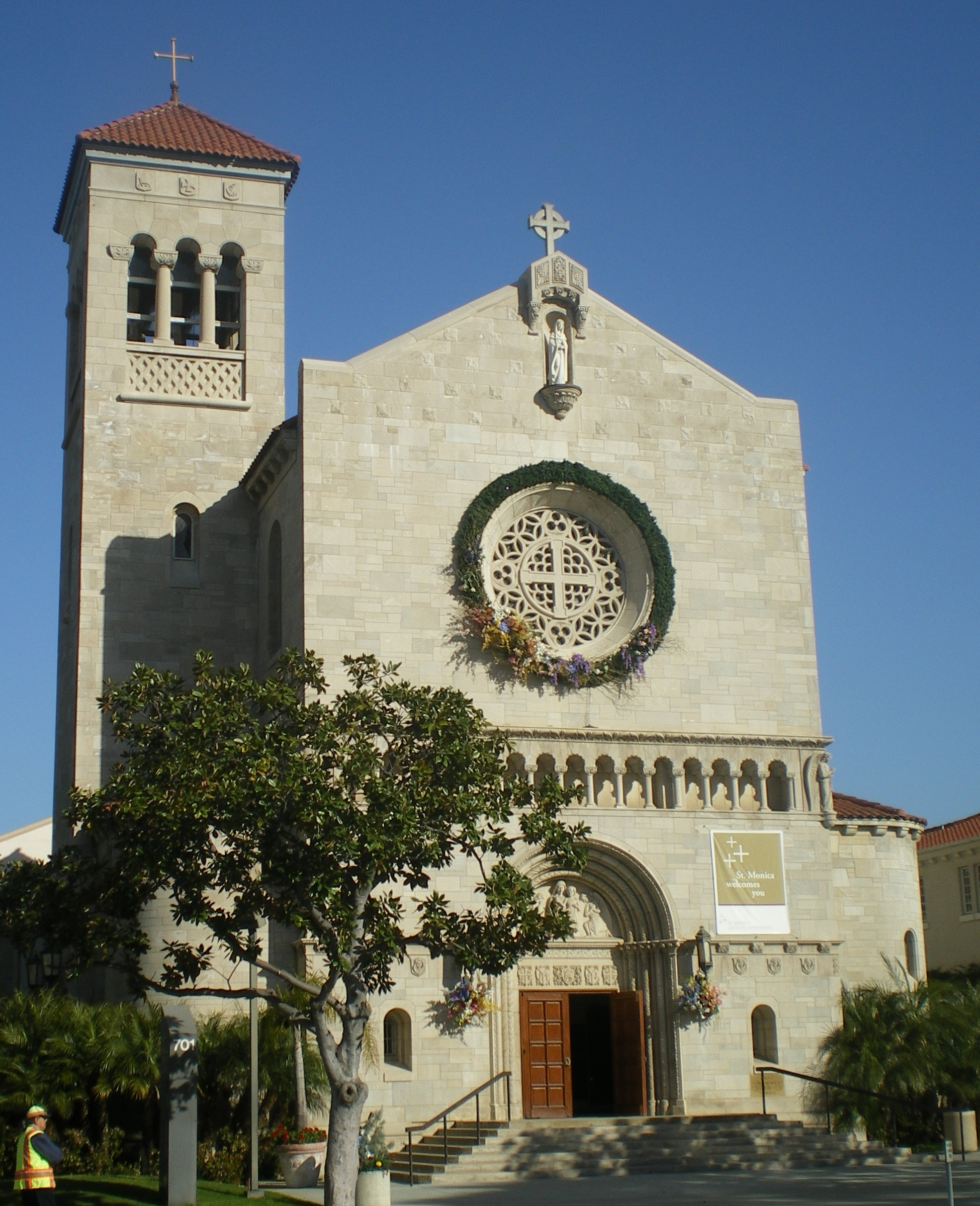
St. Monica Catholic Church (2007)

Risë Stevens, whose character is seen onscreen performing the lead role in a Metropolitan Opera (the Met) production of Carmen, was an actual performer with the Met when the film was made. A few years later she would earn enormous personal triumph as the Met's Carmen in the famous Tyrone Guthrie production of 1951, becoming the leading Carmen of her generation.

Filming locations included the following:

- Lakeside Country Club, 4500 W. Lakeside Drive, Toluca Lake, Los Angeles, California (golf sequences)
- Paramount Studios, 5555 Melrose Avenue, Hollywood, Los Angeles, California (studio)
- St. Monica Catholic Church, Santa Monica, California (St. Dominic's)
- Shrine Auditorium, Los Angeles, California (parking lot)

== Reception ==
=== Critical response ===
According to Bosley Crowther in The New York Times, Going My Way was "the best" of Crosby's career, which is "saying a lot for a performer who has been one of the steadiest joys of the screen. But, in this Leo McCarey film ... he has definitely found his sturdiest role to date." Crowther, however, criticized the film's length while lauding Crosby, and wrote that "he has been stunningly supported by Barry Fitzgerald, who plays one of the warmest characters the screen has ever known. As a matter of fact, it is a cruel slight to suggest that this is Mr. Crosby's show. It is his and Mr. Fitzgerald's together. And they make it one of the rare delights of the year."

Variety endorsed the film, saying: "Bing Crosby gets a tailor-made role in Going My Way, and with major assistance from Barry Fitzgerald and Risë Stevens, clicks solidly to provide top-notch entertainment for wide audience appeal. Picture will hit hefty biz on all booking ... Intimate scenes between Crosby and Fitzgerald dominate throughout, with both providing slick characterizations ... Crosby’s song numbers include three new tunes by Johnny Burke and James Van Heusen — 'Going My Way,' 'Would You Like to Swing on a Star' and 'Day After Forever.' Trio are topgrade and due for wide pop appeal due to cinch recording and airings by Bing. He also delivers 'Ave Maria,' 'Adeste Fideles' and 'Silent Night' in addition to a lively Irish-themed song, 'Toora-loora-looral' with boys' choir accompaniment."

On review aggregator Rotten Tomatoes, the film holds an approval rating of 85% based on 35 reviews. The website's critics consensus reads, "Bing Crosby and Barry Fitzgerald are eminently likable, and film is pleasantly sentimental, but Going My Way suffers from a surplus of sweetness." Metacritic, which uses a weighted average, assigned the film a score of 90 out of 100, based on 6 critics, indicating "universal acclaim".

=== Accolades ===
The film received ten nominations at the Oscars, winning seven in March 1945, including Barry Fitzgerald (whose work on the film was nominated for both Best Actor and Best Supporting Actor). Bing Crosby won for Best Actor, while Fitzgerald won for Best Supporting Actor. (Subsequently, the rules were changed to prevent a recurrence). Its record of six above-the-line wins was matched in 2022 by Everything Everywhere All At Once.

Award	Category	Nominee(s)	Result	Ref.
Academy Awards	Best Motion Picture	Paramount Pictures	Won	
Academy Awards	Best Director	Leo McCarey	Won	
Academy Awards	Best Actor	Bing Crosby	Won	
Academy Awards	Best Actor	Barry Fitzgerald	Nominated	
Academy Awards	Best Supporting Actor	Barry Fitzgerald	Won	
Academy Awards	Best Screenplay	Frank Butler and Frank Cavett	Won	
Academy Awards	Best Original Motion Picture Story	Leo McCarey	Won	
Academy Awards	Best Cinematography – Black-and-White	Lionel Lindon	Nominated	
Academy Awards	Best Film Editing	Leroy Stone	Nominated	
Academy Awards	Best Song	"Swinging on a Star"; Music by Jimmy Van Heusen; Lyrics by Johnny Burke	Won	
Argentine Film Critics Association Awards	Best Foreign Film	Leo McCarey	Won	
Golden Globe Awards	Best Picture		Won	
Golden Globe Awards	Best Supporting Actor – Motion Picture	Barry Fitzgerald	Won	
Golden Globe Awards	Best Director – Motion Picture	Leo McCarey	Won	
National Board of Review Awards	Top Ten Films		2nd place	
National Board of Review Awards	Best Acting	Bing Crosby	Won	
National Film Preservation Board	National Film Registry		Inducted	
New York Film Critics Circle Awards	Best Film		Won	
New York Film Critics Circle Awards	Best Director	Leo McCarey	Won	
New York Film Critics Circle Awards	Best Actor	Bing Crosby	Nominated	
New York Film Critics Circle Awards	Best Actor	Barry Fitzgerald	Won	
Photoplay Awards			Won	
Picturegoer Awards	Best Actor	Bing Crosby	Won	

- In 2004, Going My Way was selected for preservation in the United States National Film Registry by the Library of Congress as being "culturally, historically, or aesthetically significant".

== Soundtrack ==
- "The Day After Forever" (Jimmy Van Heusen / Johnny Burke) sung by Bing Crosby and Jean Heather, and again by Jean Heather.
- "Three Blind Mice" sung by Bing Crosby and the Robert Mitchell Boys Choir (credited onscreen as Robert Mitchell Boychoir)
- "Silent Night" sung by Bing Crosby and the Robert Mitchell Boys Choir
- "Too-Ra-Loo-Ra-Loo-Ral (That's an Irish Lullaby)" sung by Bing Crosby
- "Recitative and Habanera from Act 1 of "Carmen" sung by Risë Stevens
- "Going My Way" (Jimmy Van Heusen / Johnny Burke) sung by Bing Crosby, and again by Risë Stevens and the Robert Mitchell Boys Choir
- "Ave Maria" (Schubert) sung by Bing Crosby, Risë Stevens and the Robert Mitchell Boys Choir
- "Swinging on a Star" (Jimmy Van Heusen / Johnny Burke) sung by Bing Crosby and the Robert Mitchell Boys Choir

Bing Crosby recorded six of the songs for Decca Records and some of them were issued on a 3-disc 78 rpm set titled Selections from Going My Way. “Swinging on a Star” topped the Billboard charts for nine weeks in a 28-week stay. "Too-Ra-Loo-Ra-Loo-Ral (That's an Irish Lullaby)" was in the charts for twelve weeks with a peak position of #4. "The Day After Forever" and "Going My Way" also charted briefly. Crosby's songs were also included in the Bing's Hollywood series.

== Adaptations and related films ==
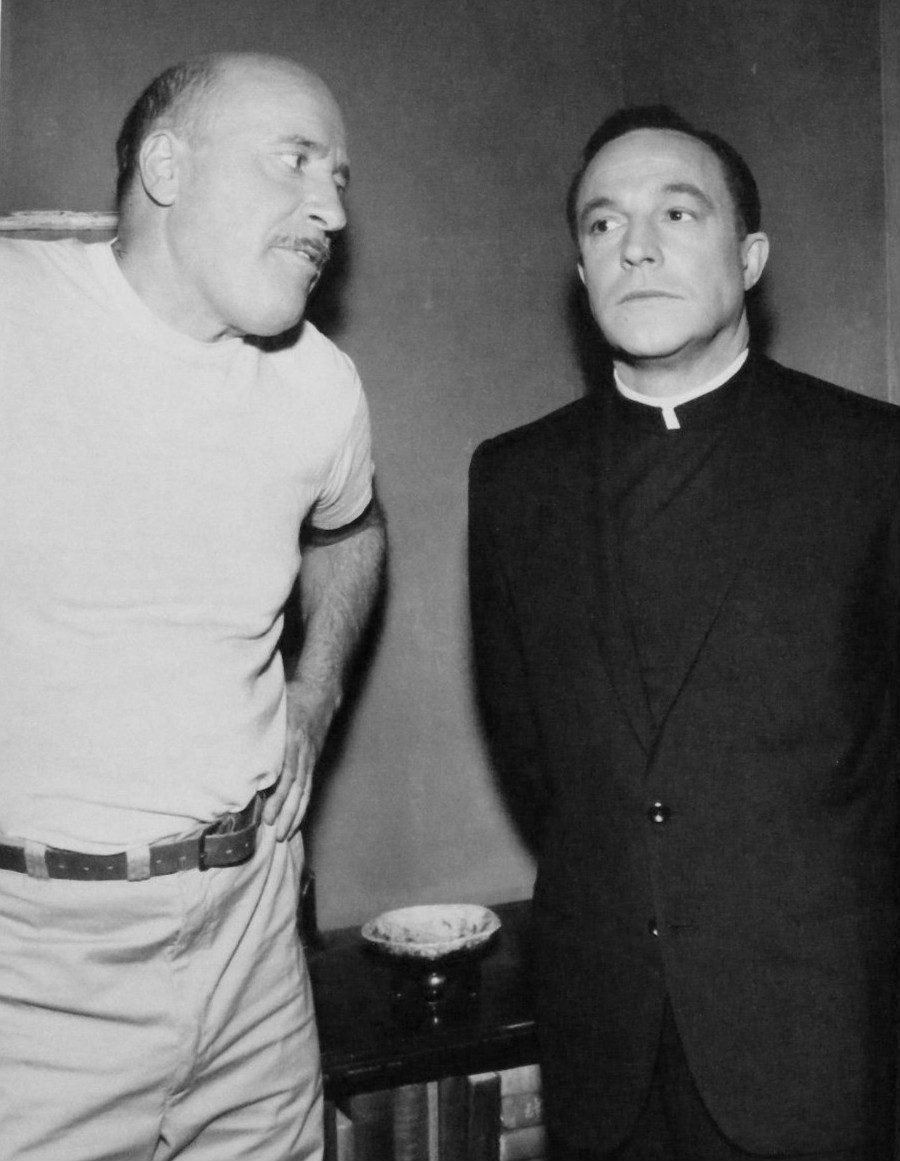
Fred Clark (in a guest role) and Gene Kelly (as Father O'Malley) in an episode of the TV adaptation

Going My Way was adapted as a radio play for the January 8, 1945, broadcast of The Screen Guild Theater starring Bing Crosby, Barry Fitzgerald and Paul Lukas. It was also adapted for the May 3, 1954, broadcast of Lux Radio Theatre with Barry Fitzgerald.

A sequel, The Bells of St. Mary's, directed by McCarey was released by RKO Pictures instead of Paramount in 1945. Crosby reprised his role as Father O'Malley and Ingrid Bergman co-starred as Sister Mary Benedict.

The film also inspired an hour-long comedy drama of the same name during the 1962–63 television season starring Gene Kelly in the role of Father O'Malley. The series ran on ABC for one season of 30 episodes.

In 1962, McCarey directed Satan Never Sleeps, also featuring an old priest and his younger substitute but set in a Chinese mission during the Communist takeover of the country in 1949.

== See also ==
- List of American films of 1944
- List of Christmas films
