= Voice in the Wind =

1944 film by Arthur Ripley

- Theatrical release poster
- Directed by: Arthur Ripley
- Screenplay by: Friedrich Torberg
- Story by: Arthur Ripley
- Produced by: Rudolph Monter; Arthur Ripley
- Starring: Francis Lederer; Sigrid Gurie; J. Edward Bromberg
- Cinematography: Richard Fryer
- Edited by: Holbrook N. Todd
- Music by: Michel Michelet
- Production company: Ripley/Monter Productions
- Distributed by: United Artists
- Release date: March 3, 1944 (United States)
- Running time: 85 minutes
- Country: United States
- Language: English

Voice in the Wind is a 1944 American film noir directed by Arthur Ripley and written by Friedrich Torberg, based on a story written by Arthur Ripley. The drama features Francis Lederer, Sigrid Gurie and J. Edward Bromberg.

== Plot ==
Jan Foley (Lederer), an amnesiac Czech pianist, is a victim of Nazi torture for playing a banned song. Living under a new identity on the island of French-governed Guadalupe, Jan tries to recall his past life while working for refugee smuggler Angelo (Alexander Granach).

To the melancholy island of Guadalupe come a band of refugees, stripped of their friends and their country by the war. Among them dwells a brooding, sinister man known only as "El Hombre," whose memory was destroyed by the brutality of the Nazis. One evening, as El Hombre sits trance-like at the piano and plays a somber melody, his music drifts into the room inhabited by other refugees, Dr. Hoffman, his wife Anna, and their invalid charge, Marya Volny. El Hombre's playing reminds Anna of Jan Volny, a famous pianist from her homeland of Czechoslovakia, and she bitterly reflects upon the life that they lost.

After finishing the piece, El Hombre reads a notice from the governor, warning refugees about "murder boats" that will promise them asylum in the U.S., but will leave them to perish at sea after fleecing them of their savings. The demented El Hombre takes the warning as a sign to destroy the fishing boat owned by his compassionate employer Angelo. El Hombre's act infuriates Angelo's cruel brothers, Luigi and Marco, who loathe the stranger and wish him dead.

As Marya's condition worsens, Anna blames herself for forcing the girl to leave her homeland and recalls the conditions that drove them into exile: After invading Prague, the Nazis grant permission to Czech pianist Jan Volny to present a concert. They stipulate, however, that "The Moldau," a much-loved patriotic symphony written by Bedrich Smetana, be excluded from the concert. Carried away by the beauty of the music, Volny ends his concert with a four-minute paraphrase of the famed symphony. Realizing that his act will draw the wrath of the Nazis and that his wife, Marya, will also suffer at the hands of their oppressors, Volny arranges for the Hoffmans to smuggle her out of the country, but before he can escape himself, he is captured and subjected to unspeakable violence, which deranges him.

En route to a concentration camp, Volny overpowers his guards and escapes. After making his way to Lisbon, he hides on a fishing boat owned by Angelo and his brothers, which embarks shortly thereafter and carries him to the island of Guadalupe. In the fog of his unhinged brain, Volny fails to remember his own name and identity, and is thus dubbed El Hombre. As Anna's thoughts return to the present, Marya, enchanted by the sound of El Hombre's piano, rises from her bed, inches her way down the stairs and then collapses in the street. El Hombre finds her there, and as he fingers the crucifix encircling her neck, his memory begins to return.

When the Hoffmans come looking for Marya, El Hombre retreats into the shadows. He begins to recall snatches of his life with Marya, but his reverie is cruelly interrupted by Luigi's harsh voice challenging him. Angelo hears shots and finds Luigi, gun in hand, standing over El Hombre's body. As the brothers argue, Luigi stabs Angelo with an ice pick. Noticing that El Hombre has vanished, the wounded Angelo follows a trail of blood up the stairs to Marya's room, where the Hoffmans are notifying the police of Marya's death. At her bedside, El Hombre cradles Marya's lifeless body in his arms, begging her to return to life. His entreaties echo the words spoken to him by Marya at the time of their separation in Czechoslovakia, affirming her certainty that he will one day come for her.

== Cast ==
- Francis Lederer as Jan Volny
- Sigrid Gurie as Marya
- J. Edward Bromberg as Dr. Hoffman
- J. Carrol Naish as Luigi
- Alexander Granach as Angelo
- David Cota as Marco
- Olga Fabian as Anna
- Howard Johnson as Capt. von Neubach
- Hans Schumm as Piesecke
- Luis Alberni as Bartender
- George Sorel as Detective
- Martin Garralaga as Policeman
- Jacqueline Dalya as Portuguese Girl
- Rudolf Myzet as Novak
- Fred Nurney as Vasek

== Reception ==
=== Critical response ===
Bosley Crowther, the film critic for The New York Times, liked the film, writing, "A dark and distressing motion picture, bravely called Voice in the Wind, which deeply laments the violation of all things beautiful in this brutal modern world, is the offering with which Arthur Ripley and Rudolph Monter, a new producing team, are presenting themselves to the public on the screen of the Victoria...Francis Lederer plays the bleakly tragic pianist quite stiffly in his lucid, normal phase and makes a wild and pathetic Looney Louie when he is hopelessly out of his mind. Sigrid Gurie is persistently somber, both in sickness and in health, as his wife, and Alexander Granach and J. Carrol Naish are splendid as two brothers who conflict within the plot. Mr. Ripley has directed the picture, as noted, for mordant effects, and has utilized music elaborately to actuate sad moods."

=== Awards ===
Nominations

- Academy Awards: Best Music, Scoring of a Dramatic or Comedy Picture, Michel Michelet; 1945.
- Academy Awards: Best Sound, Recording, Mac Dalgleish (RCA Sound); 1945.
