= Secret Command =

1944 film by A. Edward Sutherland

- Theatrical release poster
- Directed by: A. Edward Sutherland (as Eddie Sutherland)
- Screenplay by: Roy Chanslor
- Story by: John Hawkins; Ward Hawkins
- Based on: the Saturday Evening Post story "The Saboteurs"
- Produced by: Phil L. Ryan
- Starring: Pat O'Brien; Carole Landis
- Cinematography: Franz Planer
- Edited by: Viola Lawrence
- Music by: Paul Sawtell
- Production company: Torneen Productions
- Distributed by: Columbia Pictures
- Release date: July 30, 1944
- Running time: 82 minutes
- Country: United States
- Language: English

Secret Command is a 1944 American drama war film directed by A. Edward Sutherland and starring Pat O'Brien and Carole Landis. It was nominated for the Oscar for Best Effects (David Allen, Ray Cory, Robert Wright, Russell Malmgren, Harry Kusnick) in 1945.

== Plot ==
Sam Gallagher lands a job at a shipyard during World War II with the reluctant help of his brother Jeff. Unbeknownst to Jeff, Sam is actually an undercover intelligence officer looking for saboteurs among the workers.

Jeff is Sam's boss at work. Their relationship is strained; Sam did not reply or come home when Jeff sent him a letter telling him their mother was dying. Another complication is the fact that Jeff's girlfriend Lea used to be Sam's. Lea is at first glad to see Sam, until she learns that he is "married", with two children. Thane, Sam's superior, assigns him Jill McGann to pretend to be his wife, and refugee orphans Joan and Paul his children. Miller is another of Thane's agents; he is in fact a double agent, first recruited by Germany but now loyal to the Allies. He tells Sam that the Germans are plotting to destroy the entire shipyard, though he does not have any details yet. He also points out the two men he knows are enemy agents.

One of the saboteurs loosens a large bolt on a crane. When the crane is being used to move a large piece of machinery, the bolt falls off. Jeff tries to fix it high above the water, but one of the saboteurs, who is holding one of the steadying ropes, pretends to trip and lets go of the rope. Jeff falls into the water; Sam dives in and rescues his unconscious brother.

Miller tells Sam that Lessing (the big boss at the yard) and the safety inspector are both enemy agents. They are planning something big the day after an aircraft carrier is brought in. However, Simms, another of the saboteurs, recognizes Sam (who was held in a German concentration camp, but managed to escape) and vice versa. Simms follows Sam home and holds Sam and Jill at gunpoint, but Sam manages to grapple with him, and Jill strikes him with an object, killing him. Simms' death is staged to look like a car accident.

However, this spooks the spies. The entire espionage ring meets in a remote location and learns the identity of their real leader, Gestapo Colonel Hugo Von Braun, aka "Brownie" Brownell, a seemingly loyal shipyard worker. Von Braun knows that Simms' death was not accidental, so he keeps everyone together so as not to endanger the culmination of their mission the next day. Miller telephones Sam, but Von Braun kills him before he can say anything of importance. The spies go to Sam's home, but in the darkness, Von Braun mistakes Red Kelly for him and shoots Red. Before he dies, Red is able to tell Jill it was "Brownie". Thane and his men catch all the saboteurs - that they know of - in the act and arrest them. Jill rushes up and tells Sam that Brownie is one of them. Von Braun manages to activate a bomb, but Sam finds him and, after a fight that ends up in the water, drowns him. Then he stops the bomb from going off just in time.

Afterward, Sam decides he wants to keep his pretend family, so he proposes to Jill, and she accepts.

== Cast ==
- Pat O'Brien as Sam Gallagher
- Carole Landis as Jill McGann
- Chester Morris as Jeff Gallagher
- Ruth Warrick as Lea Damaron
- Barton MacLane as Red Kelly
- Tom Tully as Colonel Hugo Von Braun, aka "Brownie" Brownell
- Wallace Ford as Miller
- Howard Freeman as Max Lessing
- Erik Rolf as Ben Royall
- Matt McHugh as Curly
- Frank Sully as Shawn
- Frank Fenton as Simms
- Charles D. Brown as James Thane
- Carol Nugent as Joan
- Richard Lyon as Paul
