= Oscar Huldschinsky =

German coal and steel entrepreneur, art collector and philanthropist

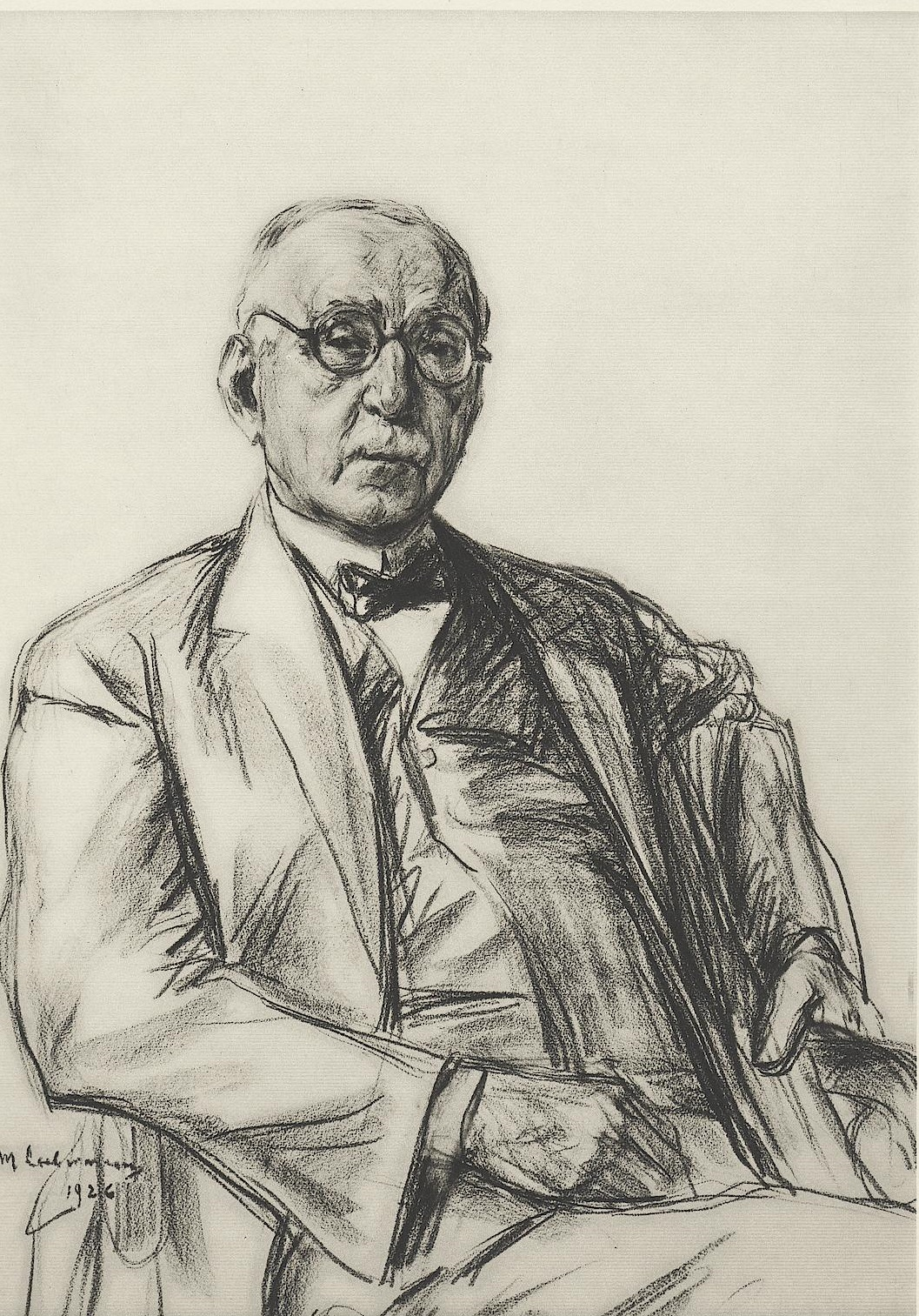

Oscar Huldschinsky (16 November 1846 in Breslau – 21 September 1931 in Berlin) was a German coal and steel entrepreneur, art collector and philanthropist.

== Life ==
Oscar Huldschinsky was a son of the factory owner Salomon Huldschinsky. Like his brother Edwin Huldschinsky, he became a partner in the company S. Huldschinsky & Sons founded by his father, which was active in the coal mining and iron industry in Silesia and operated, among other things, tube rolling mills in Sosnowitz (then Russian Poland) and iron and steel works in Gleiwitz. Oscar Huldschinsky himself moved to Berlin in the 1870s. In 1914 his fortune was estimated at 30 million marks. In 1897 he joined the Society of Friends.

In 1882 he married Ida Brandeis-Weikersheim (1860–1912), a daughter of the Viennese wholesaler, banker and British consul Salomon Brandeis-Weikersheim (1813–1877) in Vienna. Huldschinsky had a villa built on the Großer Wannsee in 1890/1891, which at that time had the address Friedrich-Karl-Straße 19. Another villa for his children was built in the neo-baroque style in 1907/1908 in the immediate vicinity. Today the property has the address Am Sandwerder 33/35. In addition to the two houses and the gardens, it also included a boat harbor with a viewing terrace, a garden pavilion with an open arch hall and a winter garden, which Alfred Breslauer and Oscar Huldschinsky's son Paul later expanded. From 1904 to 1913 Oscar Huldschinsky was the owner of the sailing yacht Susanne designed by William Fife, which won numerous regattas.

=== Art collection ===
Oscar Huldschinsky, who was a founding member of the Kaiser Friedrich Museum Association, invested part of his money in an extensive art collection that included paintings by Sandro Botticelli, Tiepolo, Rembrandt, Frans Hals, Jacob van Ruisdael and Peter Paul Rubens. He gave the Berlin museums several generous foundations. For example, the National Gallery received the pastel painting Entertainment by Edgar Degas and the sculpture The Thinker by Auguste Rodin, and the Gemäldegalerie received the Lamentation of Christ by Hugo van der Goes and Maria with the Child from the workshop of Jan van Scorel. In 1898 Wilhelm von Bode, who advised Huldschinsky on his purchases, presented the Huldschinsky collection in the Berlin picture gallery. In 1909 he published a brochure on Huldschinsky's collection. In 1926, Huldschinsky was painted by Max Liebermann. Oscar Huldschinsky had to auction some of his works of art in 1928 after he lost all of his property in Upper Silesia in the 1921 Upper Silesia plebiscite.

=== Wannsee property ===
He also had to sell his residence at Wannsee. The industrialist and banker Georgschicht, who emigrated to London a few years after the purchase, became the new owner. In 1942 the property became the property of the German Reich. It was initially used by the Reich Forest Administration, later the Italian ambassador moved to Huldschinsky's villa. On 19 June 1948 the establishment of the Free University of Berlin was discussed there. Between 1954 and 1995 the villa served as a hospital; In 1999 the main building was sold. The side villa, in which Huldschinsky's children once lived, is being renovated.

=== Nazi persecution of Huldschinsky family ===
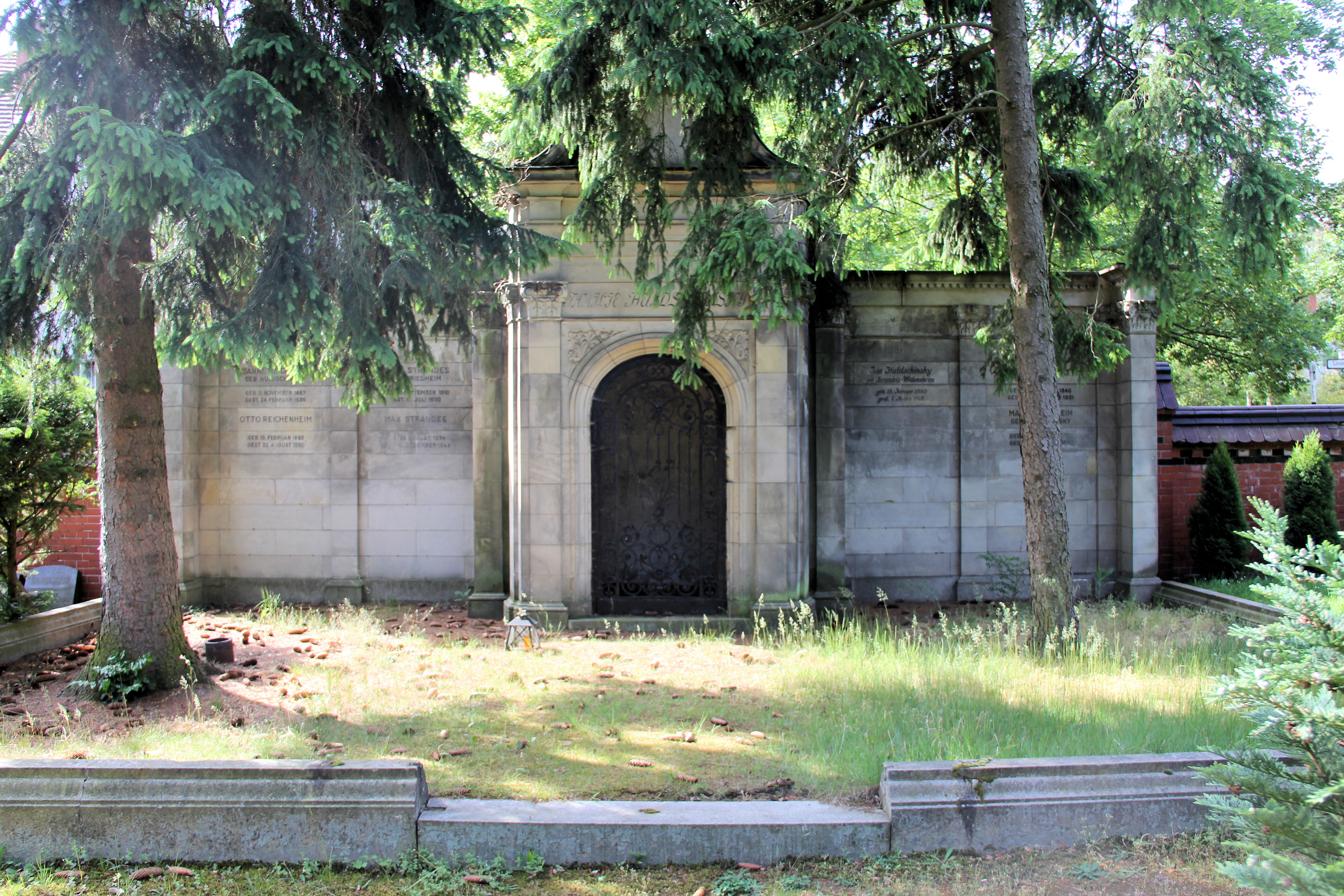
The Huldschinsky family crypt in the Wannsee cemetery in Berlin-Zehlendorf

Oscar Huldschinsky was buried as a Jew in the New Cemetery in Wannsee. His grave in a family crypt of Otto Stahn has been preserved. While he was still alive, he applied for Jews to be buried in this cemetery. His son Paul was interned in the concentration camp in Sachsenhausen in November 1938. After his release, Paul Huldschinsky and his family fled to the US, where he settled in Santa Monica, west of Los Angeles, and became part of the German-speaking community in exile there. His daughter, Susanne (née Reichenheim), died trying to arrange the escape of her family from Nazi Germany. Huldshinsky's favorite granddaughter Anna-Susanne Sommer (née Reichenheim) was artistically gifted. On his death Hulschinky left her and the other four grandchildren 66,000 RM each as well as artworks from his collection. In 1937, the Gestapo arrested Anna-Susanne's husband, Hans, who worked in film, as he performed on the Scala Theatre stage, demanding that he divorce his Jewish wife, which he refused to do. Persecuted and plundered by the Nazis because of their Jewish heritage, most of the family managed to escape to the United States. The book Lost Lives, Lost Art: Jewish Collectors, Nazi Art Theft, and the Quest for Justice devotes a chapter to them entitled, "Oscar Huldschinsky (1846-1931) and Ann Sommer (1910-2009)"

== Literature ==
- Kunstsalon Paul Cassirer (Hrsg.): Die Sammlung Oscar Huldschinsky. Berlin, 1928. [Versteigerung: Donnerstag, den 10. Mai, Freitag, den 11. Mai 1928.] Digitalisat der UB Heidelberg.
- Cella-Margaretha Girardet: Jüdische Mäzene für die Preußischen Museen zu Berlin. Hänsel-Hohenhausen, Egelsbach 1997, ISBN 3-8267-1133-5, eingeschränkte Vorschau in der Google-Buchsuche.
- . In: ghwk.de, 10. Oktober 2004, und als PDF; 339 kB.
