= Chandler Sprague =

American screenwriter

- Born: Haverhill, Massachusetts, U.S.
- Died: November 15, 1955; Sacramento, California, U.S.
- Education: Western Maryland College
- Occupations: Screenwriter, reporter, columnist

Chandler Sprague (died November 15, 1955) was an American veteran, screenwriter, reporter, and columnist. He served in World War I (for which he received the Distinguished Service Cross, the Silver Star, and the Purple Heart) and World War II. He was a reporter for The Baltimore Sun and a movie columnist for the Los Angeles Examiner, and he worked for United Artists, Paramount Pictures, and Metro-Goldwyn-Mayer. He wrote the scripts of many movies, including Camille, The Street of Sin, and The Bashful Bachelor.
