= New Americans (film) =

1944 film

- Directed by: Slavko Vorkapić
- Distributed by: RKO Pictures
- Release date: 1944
- Country: United States
- Language: English

New Americans is a 1944 American short documentary film directed by Slavko Vorkapić. It was part of RKO Pictures's This Is America series and featured the National Refugee Service. It was nominated for an Academy Award for Best Documentary Short.
