= Sterling Hayden filmography =

Sterling Hayden was an American actor.

== Films ==
Year	Title	Role	Notes
1941	Virginia	Norman Williams	Film debut
1941	Bahama Passage	Adrian Ainsworth	
1947	Blaze of Noon	Tad McDonald	
1949	El Paso	Bert Donner	
1949	Manhandled	Joe Cooper	
1950	The Asphalt Jungle	Dix Handley	
1951	Journey into Light	Reverend John Burrows	Alternate title: Skid Road
1952	The Star	Jim Johannson Barry Lester	
1952	Flaming Feather	Tex McCloud	
1952	Denver and Rio Grande	McCabe	Promoted as Denver & Rio Grande in the United States
1952	Hellgate	Gilman Hanley	
1952	The Golden Hawk	Kit Gerardo/The Hawk	
1952	Flat Top	Commander Dan Collier	United Kingdom title: Eagles of the Fleet
1953	Fighter Attack	Steve	
1953	So Big	Pervis DeJong	
1953	Take Me to Town	Will Hall	
1953	Kansas Pacific	Captain John Nelson	
1954	Crime Wave	Det. Lt. Sims	Also called The City Is Dark
1954	Prince Valiant	Sir Gawain	
1954	Arrow in the Dust	Bart Laish	
1954	Johnny Guitar	Johnny "Guitar" Logan	Title role
1954	Naked Alibi	Chief Joe Conroy	
1954	Suddenly	Sheriff Tod Shaw	
1955	Battle Taxi	Capt. Russ Edwards	United States title: Operation Air Rescue
1955	Timberjack	Tim Chipman	
1955	Shotgun	Clay Hardin	
1955	The Eternal Sea	Rear-Adm. John Madison Hoskins	Alternate title: The Admiral Hoskins Story
1955	Top Gun	Rick Martin	
1955	The Last Command	Jim Bowie	United States title: San Antonio de Bexar
1956	The Come On	Dave Arnold	
1956	The Killing	Johnny Clay	
1957	Crime of Passion	Police Lt. Bill Doyle	
1957	5 Steps to Danger	John Emmett	
1957	Gun Battle at Monterey	Jay Turner/John York	
1957	Valerie	John Garth	
1957	Zero Hour!	Captain Martin Treleaven	
1957	The Iron Sheriff	Sheriff Samuel 'Sam' Galt	
1958	Ten Days to Tulara	Scotty	
1958	Terror in a Texas Town	George Hansen	
1964	Dr. Strangelove	Brigadier General Jack D. Ripper	
1964	Carol for Another Christmas	Daniel Grudge	TV movie
1969	Hard Contract	Michael Carlson	
1970	Ternos Caçadores	Allan	
1970	Loving	Lepridon	
1971	Le Saut de l'ange	Mason/Custer	
1972	The Godfather	Captain McCluskey	
1972	Le Grand départ	M. Nature/The Leader	
1973	The Long Goodbye	Roger Wade/Billy Joe Smith	
1973	The Final Programme	Maj. Wrongway Lindbergh	
1974	Deadly Strangers	Malcolm Robarts	
1975	Is It Any Wonder?		
1975	Cipolla Colt	"Henry 'Jack' Pullitzer"	Alternate titles: Cry, Onion!, Spaghetti Western, The Smell of Onion
1976	1900	Leo Dalcò	
1978	King of the Gypsies	King Zharko Stepanowicz	
1979	Winter Kills	Z.K. Dawson	
1980	The Outsider	Seamus Flaherty	
1980	9 to 5	Russell Tinsworthy	
1981	Gas	Duke Stuyvesant	
1981	Venom	Howard Anderson	Final film

== Television ==
Year	Title	Episode	Role	Notes
1953	The Philip Morris Playhouse	"Nightmare"		Episode 1.5
1954	Schlitz Playhouse of Stars	"Delay at Fort Bess"		
1956	Celebrity Playhouse	"Girl at Large"		
1957	Zane Grey Theater	"The Necessary Breed"	Link Stevens	
1957	Wagon Train	"The Les Rand Story"	Les Rand	
1957	General Electric Theater	"The Iron Horse"	Joe Turner	
1957	Playhouse 90	"A Sound of Different Drummers"	Gordon Miller	
1958	Schlitz Playhouse of Stars	"East of the Moon"	Neal Norton	
1958	Goodyear Theatre	"Points Beyond"	Lieutenant Charley Ewell	
1958	Playhouse 90	"The Last Man"	Mitch Barrett	
1958	Playhouse 90	"The Long March"	Col. Rocky Templeton	
1958	Playhouse 90	"Old Man"	J.J. Taylor	
1960	The DuPont Show of the Month	"Ethan Frome"	Ethan Frome	
1964	Carol for Another Christmas		Daniel Grudge	
1973	The Starlost	"Voyage of Discovery"	Old Jeremiah	
1974	Banacek	"Fly Me – If You Can Find Me"	Tony Fowler	
1977	The Godfather: A Novel for Television	No.1.1 – 1.4	Capt. McCluskey	
1982	The Blue and the Gray		John Brown	Last appearance
