= Flaming Feather =

1952 film by Ray Enright

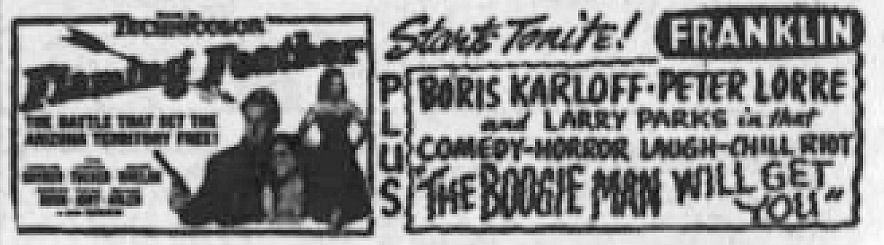
- Newspaper advertisement for Flaming Feather and The Boogie Man Will Get You
- Directed by: Ray Enright
- Written by: Gerald Drayson Adams
- Produced by: Nat Holt
- Starring: Sterling Hayden; Forrest Tucker; Arleen Whelan; Barbara Rush
- Cinematography: Ray Rennahan
- Edited by: Elmo Billings
- Music by: Paul Sawtell
- Production company: Nat Holt Productions
- Distributed by: Paramount Pictures
- Release date: February 1952
- Running time: 77 minutes
- Country: United States
- Language: English
- Box office: $1.25 million (U.S. rentals)

Flaming Feather is a 1952 American Technicolor Western film directed by Ray Enright and starring Sterling Hayden. The film was shot on location at Oak Creek Canyon and the Montezuma Castle National Monument near Sedona, Arizona. Local Yavapai Indians were employed as extras but refused to enter the cliff dwellings that represented the resting place of their ancestors. Production was delayed for one day while a band of Navajos was imported from a reservation more than 100 miles away to replace them.

== Plot ==
A mysterious outlaw known only as the Sidewinder is terrorizing Arizona settlers. A rancher whose property was raided, Tex McCloud, and a U.S. Cavalry officer named Blaine both resolve to seek justice and make a friendly wager over who will capture the Sidewinder.

Wealthy saloon entertainer Carolina tries to persuade Tex to also pursue Lucky Lee, a mine owner who owes her $20,000. She tries to seduce Tex, but he is not interested. After he changes hotel rooms with Lucky's longtime sweetheart Nora Logan, an ambush is attempted by gambler Showdown Calhoun and his partner, who raid the wrong room. However, they kidnap Nora to their stagecoach, and Tex rides to her rescue.

Nora explains that she is involved with Lucky only because he had saved her from a similar assault. Lucky thinks that Tombstone Jack may be the Sidewinder, but after Carolina kills Tombstone, Tex and Blaine begin to suspect that Lucky is the culprit. Turquoise, a Ute woman who loves Lucky, knows that he is the outlaw.

Now the marshal for the territory, Tex gathers a posse to pursue Lucky, who has snatched Nora and ridden to a hideout. Lucky conspires with a band of Utes to attack the posse, and Carolina and Showdown are killed. Tex and Blaine reach the hideout, but the jealous Turquoise has already killed Lucky. The men cancel their wager.

== Cast ==
- Sterling Hayden as Tex McCloud
- Forrest Tucker as Lt. Tom Blaine
- Arleen Whelan as Carolina
- Barbara Rush as Nora Logan
- Victor Jory as Lucky Lee aka Sidewinder
- Richard Arlen as Eddie 'Showdown' Calhoun
- Edgar Buchanan as Sgt. O'Rourke
- Carol Thurston as Turquoise
- Ian MacDonald as Tombstone Jack
- George Cleveland as Doc Fallon

== See also ==
- Sterling Hayden filmography
