= Ross Hunter =

American actor and producer (1920–1996)

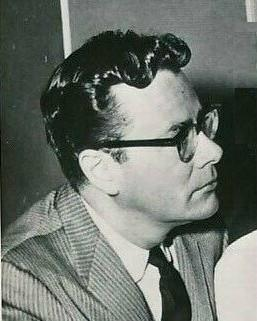
- Ross Hunter (1958)
- Born: Martin Terry Fuss; May 6, 1920 (Note: Sources have given various birth years. His obituary by the Los Angeles Times states that his birth year was given between 1916 and 1926, and, if he was born on May 6, then his New York Times obituary gives a birth year of 1920. The confusion is cleared up by the Social Security file for Martin Terry Fuss, which states that he was born on May 6, 1920. See https://www.familysearch.org/ark:/61903/1:1:6K3W-SXWR.); Cleveland, Ohio, U.S.
- Died: March 10, 1996 (aged 75); Los Angeles, California, U.S.
- Resting place: Westwood Village Memorial Park Cemetery
- Occupations: Film and television producer, actor
- Years active: 1944–1979
- Partner: Jacques Mapes

Ross Hunter (born Martin Terry Fuss; May 6, 1920 – March 10, 1996) was an American film and television producer and actor. He is best known for producing light comedies such as Pillow Talk (1959), and the glamorous melodramas Magnificent Obsession (1954), Imitation of Life (1959), and Back Street (1961).

Over the course of his career, Hunter produced films of various genres but found his greatest success with light-hearted comedies, musicals and melodramatic "tear jerkers" that were high on romance and glamour.

== Biography ==
=== Early life ===
Hunter was born in Cleveland, Ohio. Sources suggest various birth years for him — 1916, 1926, or even 1929, according to Hunter himself - but his Social Security record lists May 6, 1920, a date confirmed by his 1942 army enlistment record and also by the 1940 census. He was of Austrian Jewish and German Jewish descent. He attended Glenville High School, where he later taught English and drama; he also taught these subjects at Rawlings High School).

During World War II, he worked in United States Army Intelligence. After his Army service, he returned to his job as a drama teacher. He eventually moved to Los Angeles after his students sent his photo to Paramount Pictures. Paramount Pictures passed on signing him to a contract and he subsequently signed with Columbia Pictures. It was at Columbia that a casting agent changed his name from "Martin Fuss" to "Ross Hunter".

=== Actor ===
During the 1940s, Hunter acted in a number of B-movie musicals. He was a leading man in his first movie, Louisiana Hayride (1944), starring Judy Canova. Hunter had support parts in Ever Since Venus (1944) and She's a Sweetheart (1944) and was promoted to star for A Guy, a Gal and a Pal (1945), directed by Budd Boetticher. He was reunited with Canova for Hit the Hay (1945). He was the second lead in a war film, Out of the Depths (1945) and had a support role in Sweetheart of Sigma Chi (1946). His career stalled in part because he was stricken with penicillin poisoning.

He returned to teaching drama at the Ben Bard Dramatic School and also taught speech therapy. Hunter missed working in films and decided to return to the business and focus on film production. During the late 1940s, Hunter enrolled at the Motion Picture Center Studio where he was trained – for free – in film production. "I never wanted to be on the receiving end again", he said. "I wanted to be the man who handed out the jobs."

=== Dialogue director ===
Hunter was dialogue director in The Jackie Robinson Story (1950), for Eagle-Lion Films. He performed similar duties on Woman on the Run (1950) at Universal with Ann Sheridan who Hunter says promoted and mentored him. "It was my real big break", he later said.

He was dialogue director on The Sword of Monte Cristo (1951) at Fox, and When I Grow Up (1951) for Sam Spiegel at United Artists.

=== Associate producer ===
In 1951, Universal-International hired him as an associate producer for the film Flame of Araby, starring Jeff Chandler and Maureen O'Hara. During production Hunter cut $172,000 from the film's budget, which pleased Universal executives, who raised his salary.

The producer was Leonard Goldstein, who also used Hunter as an associate on Steel Town (1952), with Ann Sheridan, directed by George Sherman; The Battle at Apache Pass (1952), with Jeff Chandler, directed by Sherman; Untamed Frontier (1952), with Joseph Cotten and Shelley Winters; The Duel at Silver Creek (1952) with Audie Murphy, directed by Don Siegel; and Son of Ali Baba (1952), an "Eastern" with Tony Curtis.

They also worked on Take Me to Town (1953), a Western with Sheridan and Sterling Hayden directed by Douglas Sirk who became important to Hunter's career. Sheridan's normal price was $475,000 per film but she agreed to $100,000 to work with Hunter. "It was Annie who really gave me my first break", later recalled Hunter. "She was a very great lady."

=== Staff producer ===
In 1953, Universal-International hired Hunter as staff producer on the strength of his previous credits as a theatrical producer and director. Hunter's first film as sole producer was All I Desire (1953), a melodrama directed by Sirk starring Barbara Stanwyck. It was made for $460,000 and earned over $2 million. He followed it with two Westerns, Tumbleweed (1953) with Audie Murphy, and Taza, Son of Cochise (1954) with Rock Hudson, directed by Sirk.

==== Magnificent Obsession ====
The breakthrough film of Hunter's career was the 1954 film remake of the 1935 film Magnificent Obsession, starring Rock Hudson and Jane Wyman and directed by Sirk. It was a huge hit, making over $5 million, establishing Hudson as a star.

Hunter produced a film noir with Sterling Hayden, Naked Alibi (1954); and a Western with Lex Barker, The Yellow Mountain (1954). He was reunited with Hudson and Sirk on a costume swashbuckler set in Ireland, Captain Lightfoot (1955). Having enjoyed success with a remake, Hunter remade another old melodrama, There's Always Tomorrow (1955), directed by Sirk with Stanwyck. He produced One Desire (1955), a melodrama with Hudson and Anne Baxter, then All That Heaven Allows (1955), which reteamed Sirk, Hudson and Wyman. The latter was especially popular, making over $3 million.

Hunter stepped in at the last minute to produce a "northern", The Spoilers (1955), another remake, with Jeff Chandler and Anne Baxter. He did Battle Hymn (1957), a biopic with Hudson and Sirk.

==== Romantic comedies ====
Hunter's first romantic comedy as producer was Tammy and the Bachelor (1957) with Debbie Reynolds. It was very successful making $3 million. Less popular were two films he did with June Allyson, Interlude (1957), a melodrama with Rossano Brazzi directed by Sirk, and My Man Godfrey (1957) with David Niven directed by Henry Koster.

This Happy Feeling (1958) was a romantic comedy with Reynolds and John Saxon written and directed by Blake Edwards. He produced The Restless Years (1958), a teen melodrama with Saxon and Sandra Dee. Dee was also in A Stranger in My Arms (1959), a melodrama from the author of Written on the Wind with Allyson and Jeff Chandler.

==== Imitation of Life and Pillow Talk ====
Hunter hit big in 1959 with Imitation of Life and Pillow Talk. Imitation of Life was a remake of the 1934 film directed by Sirk, with Lana Turner, Dee and Rock Hudson look-alike John Gavin. It was the fourth-most successful film during 1959 in the US, and went on to earn theatrical rentals of $6.4 million. The film was bettered in popularity by the romantic comedy Pillow Talk, starring Doris Day and Rock Hudson, which was released later in the year and went on to earn rentals of $7.6 million in the United States and Canada. Following the back-to-back successes of Tammy, Imitation of Life and Pillow Talk, he was the most successful producer at Universal. While "Ross Hunter movies" were a hit with audiences, his work was largely dismissed by critics. Hunter later said, "I gave the public what they wanted: a chance to dream, to live vicariously, to see beautiful women, jewels, gorgeous clothes, melodrama."

Hunter followed these with two mystery melodramas, both written by Ivan Goff and Ben Roberts: Portrait in Black (1960), starring Turner, Anthony Quinn, Dee and Saxon; and Midnight Lace (1960) starring Day, Rex Harrison and Gavin. Portrait was one of the top 20 grossing films of the year and Universal's second highest.

Hunter produced a sequel to Tammy, Tammy Tell Me True (1961), with Dee replacing Reynolds in the title role, and Gavin as the male lead. Gavin starred in a remake of Back Street (1961) with Susan Hayward, which was a box office disappointment.

Hunter produced a popular adaptation of the Rodgers and Hammerstein musical Flower Drum Song (1961).

In 1962 Hunter announced he had six films coming up: If a Man Answers, a new Tammy, remakes of Dark Angel and Madam X, The Thrill of It All and The Chalk Garden. Plans to make In the Wrong Rain and Fanfare were postponed.

He did two romantic comedies with Dee, If a Man Answers (1962) with Bobby Darin and Tammy and the Doctor (1963) with Peter Fonda.

Hunter produced a hugely popular comedy with Day and James Garner, The Thrill of It All (1963), directed by Norman Jewison. He then did his first ever straight drama, The Chalk Garden (1964) with Deborah Kerr and Hayley Mills, which was well reviewed and performed well commercially. "I'd like to make one Chalk Garden type movie a year if I can find a good one", Hunter said. Dark Angel wound up not being made. He said around this time, "My principle is to know the audience you're aiming for – women, teenage, family audience – and aim straight at it, casting and budget accordingly." He said Goldwyn offered him the remake rights to Stella Dallas but he did not think he could do it.

=== Seven-year contract ===
In November 1964 he signed a seven-year contract with Universal to make three films a year, with an overall budget of $75 million.

He produced I'd Rather Be Rich (1964) with Dee, a remake of It Started with Eve (1941), and The Art of Love (1965) with Garner, directed by Jewison.

Hunter produced a remake of Madam X (1966) with Turner. He was going to remake Dark Angel but it was not made. "Tear jerkers are more difficult to make than any other kind of movie", he said.

In 1965 it was estimated that 32 of his films had, in eleven years, grossed $150 million.

Hunter did a lower budgeted comedy without stars, The Pad and How to Use It (1966), from a play by Peter Shaffer but it was little seen. He had a big hit with the musical Thoroughly Modern Millie (1967) starring Julie Andrews, Mary Tyler Moore and Gavin. Rosie! (1968) was less successful, a comedy with Rosalind Russell (playing a role intended for Katharine Hepburn) and Dee.

In 1970, he had a major box office hit with Airport which also earned him a Best Picture Academy Award nomination. However, Hunter had a falling out with Universal, and left the studio after almost two decades.

=== Columbia ===
Hunter went to Columbia where he produced the musical remake of the 1937 film Lost Horizon. The film was a box office failure and critical disaster, ultimately losing the studio $7 million. It would be the last feature film Hunter produced.

He was briefly head of Brut Productions but left after disagreements with the company.

=== Television ===
In 1975, Hunter was hired by Paramount Pictures to produce for television. His first produced film for them was The Lives of Jenny Dolan (1975) with Shirley Jones.

In 1977, he was nominated a Primetime Emmy Award for Outstanding Limited Series for producing Arthur Hailey's The Moneychangers (1976) (he shared the nomination with his long-time professional and personal partner, Jacques Mapes).

He produced A Family Upside Down (1978) with Fred Astaire and Helen Hayes, and Suddenly, Love (1979) with Cindy Williams.

His last project was the 1979 television movie The Best Place to Be with Donna Reed.

== Personal life ==
In the entertainment industry, rumors about Hunter’s sexuality sometimes circulated, but they were not reported publicly during his lifetime.

== Death ==
Hunter died of cancer at the Century City Hospital in Los Angeles on March 10, 1996. He is interred at Westwood Village Memorial Park Cemetery.

== Filmography ==
=== Actor ===
Year	Title	Role	Notes
1944	Louisiana Hayride	Gordon Pearson	
1944	Ever Since Venus	Bradley Miller	
1944	She's a Sweetheart	Paul	
1945	A Guy, a Gal and a Pal	Jimmy Jones	
1944	Hit the Hay	Ted Barton	
1945	Out of the Depths	Clayton Shepherd	
1946	The Bandit of Sherwood Forest	Robin Hood's Man	Uncredited
1946	Sweetheart of Sigma Chi	Ted Sloan	
1951	The Groom Wore Spurs	Austin Tindale	Uncredited
1956	There's Always Tomorrow	Cameo appearance	Uncredited

=== Producer ===
Year	Title	Notes
1950	The Jackie Robinson Story	Dialogue director
1950	Woman on the Run	Dialogue director
1951	The Sword of Monte Cristo	Dialogue director
1951	When I Grow Up	Script supervisor
1951	Flame of Araby	Associate producer Alternative title: Flame of the Desert
1952	The Battle at Apache Pass	Associate producer
1952	Steel Town	Associate producer
1952	Untamed Frontier	Associate producer Uncredited
1952	The Duel at Silver Creek	Associate producer Uncredited
1952	Son of Ali Baba	Associate producer
1953	Take Me to Town	
1953	All I Desire	
1953	Tumbleweed	
1954	Taza, Son of Cochise	
1954	Magnificent Obsession	
1954	Naked Alibi	
1954	The Yellow Mountain	
1955	Captain Lightfoot	
1955	One Desire	
1955	All That Heaven Allows	
1955	The Spoilers	
1956	There's Always Tomorrow	
1957	Battle Hymn	
1957	Tammy and the Bachelor	
1957	Interlude	
1957	My Man Godfrey	
1958	This Happy Feeling	
1958	The Restless Years	
1959	A Stranger in My Arms	Alternative title: And Ride a Tiger
1959	Imitation of Life	
1959	Pillow Talk	
1960	Portrait in Black	
1960	Midnight Lace	
1961	Tammy Tell Me True	
1961	Back Street	
1961	Flower Drum Song	
1962	If a Man Answers	
1963	Tammy and the Doctor	
1963	The Thrill of It All	
1964	The Chalk Garden	
1964	I'd Rather Be Rich	
1965	The Art of Love	
1966	Madame X	
1966	The Pad and How to Use It	
1967	Thoroughly Modern Millie	
1967	Rosie!	
1970	Airport	Nominated: Academy Award for Best Picture
1973	Lost Horizon	
1975	The Lives of Jenny Dolan	Television movie Executive producer
1976	Arthur Hailey's the Moneychangers	Miniseries; Nominated: Primetime Emmy Award for Outstanding Limited Series
1976	A Family Upside Down	Television movie
1978	Suddenly, Love	Television movie
1979	The Best Place to Be	Television movie
