= Fred Coby =

American film and television actor

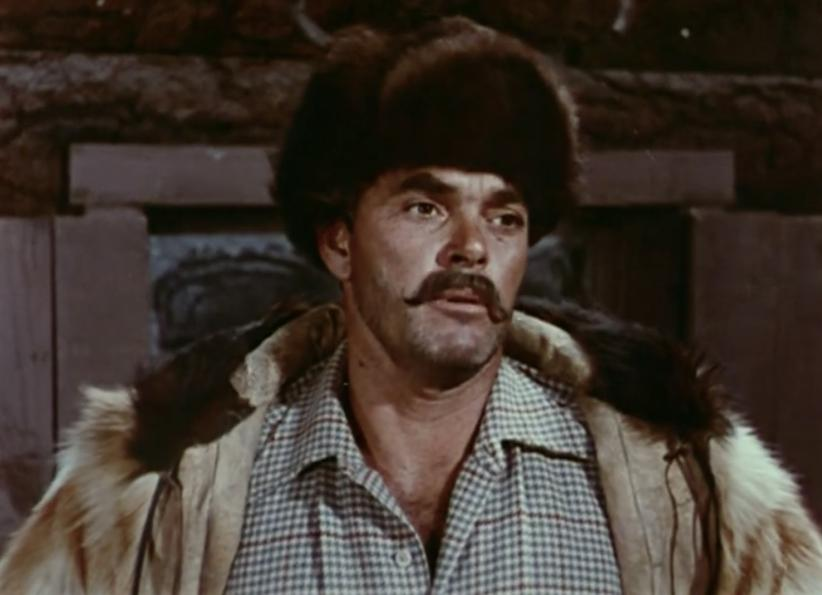
- Coby in Sergeant Preston of the Yukon, 1957
- Born: Frederick G. Beckner Jr. March 1, 1916; California, U.S.
- Died: September 27, 1970 (aged 54)
- Occupations: Film and television actor
- Years active: 1943–1970

Frederick G. Beckner Jr. (March 1, 1916 – September 27, 1970) was an American film and television actor. He was known for playing Pony Deal in the fifth season of the American western television series The Life and Legend of Wyatt Earp.

Coby died on September 27, 1970, at the age of 54.

== Partial filmography ==
- The Cross of Lorraine (1943) - French Soldier (uncredited)
- Girl Crazy (1943) - Radio Man (uncredited)
- Lost Angel (1943) - Bit Role (uncredited)
- A Guy Named Joe (1943) - Cadet (uncredited)
- Two Girls and a Sailor (1944) - Sailor (uncredited)
- Meet the People (1944) - Marine (uncredited)
- Marriage Is a Private Affair (1944) - Roger Poole (uncredited)
- They Were Expendable (1945) - Officer at Airport (uncredited)
- The Scarlet Horseman (1946) - Tioga
- Without Reservations (1946) - French Officer (uncredited)
- The Brute Man (1946) - Young Hal Moffat
- Don Ricardo Returns (1946) - Don Ricardo
- Sweethearts of Sigma Chi (1946) - Bill Ryan
- Lady Chaser (1946) - Role (uncredited)
- Unconquered (1947) - Royal American Soldier (uncredited)
- The Prairie (1947) - Abner Bush
- Devil's Cargo (1948) - Fred
- The Counterfeiters (1948) - Piper
- Jungle Goddess (1948) - Pilot
- Walk a Crooked Mile (1948) - Fred (FBI Chemist) (uncredited)
- The Three Musketeers (1948) - Musketeer (uncredited)
- The Man from Colorado (1948) - Veteran (uncredited)
- Ride, Ryder, Ride! (1949) - Henry W. Iverson
- State Department: File 649 (1949) - Vice Consul (uncredited)
- White Heat (1949) - Happy Taylor (uncredited)
- The Great Jewel Robber (1950) - Tom Colt (Convict) (uncredited)
- Halls of Montezuma (1951) - Capt. McCreavy (uncredited)
- Government Agents vs. Phantom Legion (1951) - Cady
- The Mob (1951) - Plainclothesman (uncredited)
- Bronco Buster (1952) - Doctor (uncredited)
- Pat and Mike (1952) - Trooper (uncredited)
- Scarlet Angel (1952) - Soldier (uncredited)
- My Man and I (1952) - Detective (uncredited)
- Horizons West (1952) - Townsman (uncredited)
- Above and Beyond (1952) - Guard (uncredited)
- The Man from the Alamo (1953) - Soldier (uncredited)
- Devil's Canyon (1953) - Cole Gorman (uncredited)
- Crime Wave (1954) - Cop in Squad Car (uncredited)
- A Bullet for Joey (1955) - Radio Man (uncredited)
- Illegal (1955) - Prison Guard (uncredited)
- D-Day the Sixth of June (1956) - Medic (uncredited)
- Dakota Incident (1956) - Townsman (uncredited)
- The Ten Commandments (1956) - Tackmaster/Hebrew at Golden Calf (uncredited)
- The Great American Pastime (1956) - Man in Stands (uncredited)
- The Night the World Exploded (1957) - Ranger Brown
- My Man Godfrey (1957) - Investigator
- Jailhouse Rock (1957) - Jerry the Bartender (uncredited)
- Death Valley Days (1957) - Captain Absalom Austin Townsend (episode "Rough and Ready")
- No Time for Sergeants (1958) - Sentry (uncredited)
- The Law and Jake Wade (1958) - Deputy (uncredited)
- Onionhead (1958) - Coast Guard Recruiting Officer (uncredited)
- Last Train from Gun Hill (1959) - Luke (uncredited)
- Platinum High School (1960) - Officer
- The Adventures of Huckleberry Finn (1960) - Sheriff (uncredited)
- Key Witness (1960) - Policeman (uncredited)
- Cimarron (1960) - Oil Worker (uncredited)
- Wanted Dead or Alive (TV series) (1960) season 2 episode 28 (Vendetta) : Lieutenant Carson
- Ada (1961) - Reporter (uncredited)
- Experiment in Terror (1962) - FBI Agent (uncredited)
- Billy Rose's Jumbo (1962) - Andy (uncredited)
