= Battle taxi =

Battle taxi may refer to

- Battle Taxi, a 1955 American drama film
- "Battle taxi," a colloquial name for an armoured personnel carrier
