= Joel Marston =

American film, stage and television actor

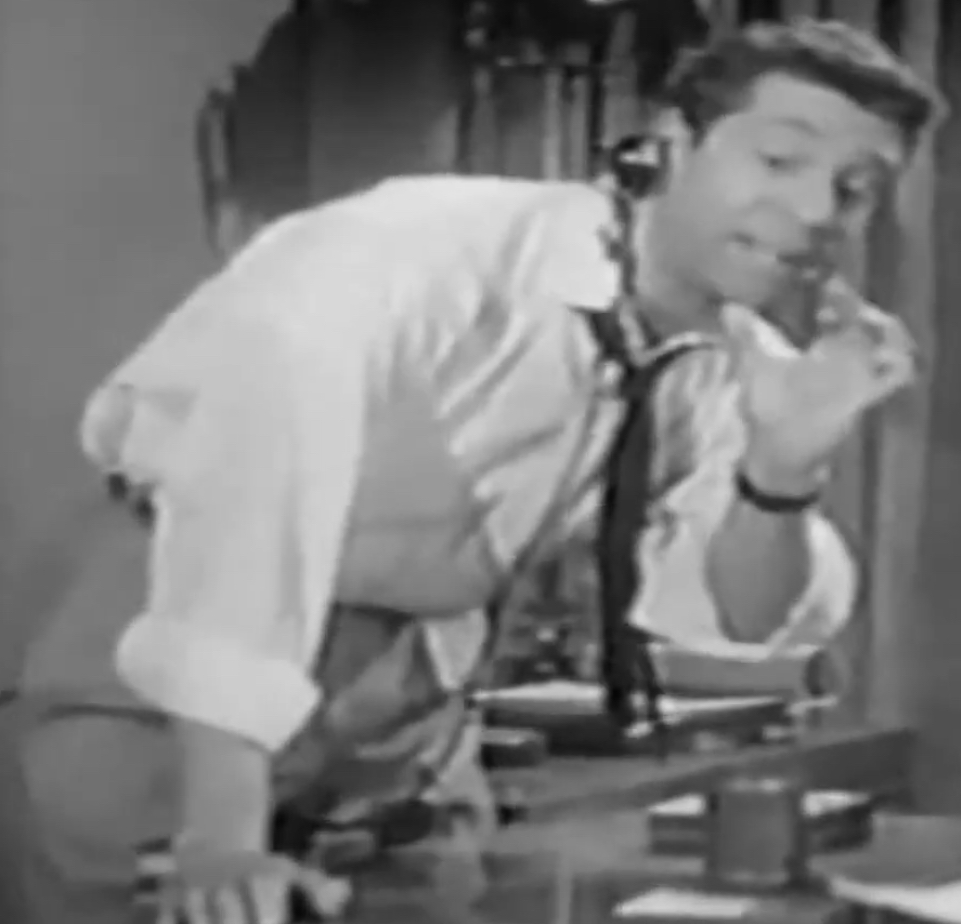
- Marston in Public Defender, 1955
- Born: Joel Friedman; March 30, 1922; Baltimore, Maryland, U.S.
- Died: October 18, 2012 (aged 90); Jacksonville, Florida, U.S.
- Occupations: Film, stage and television actor

Joel Friedman (March 30, 1922 – October 18, 2012) was an American film, stage and television actor.

== Life and career ==
Marston was born in Baltimore, Maryland. He attended and graduated from Central High School, and acted at the Roadside Theater. He began his stage career in the 1930s, and in 1944, he appeared in the stage play Wallflower, playing Warren, a romantic juvenile. He began his screen career in 1949, appearing in the film Sky Dragon. In the same year, he appeared in the films Jiggs and Maggie in Jackpot Jitters, Forgotten Women, There's a Girl in My Heart and Mississippi Rhythm.

Over a span of sixteen years, Marston performed in the Summer Stock cast at the Elitch Theatre during seven separate summers: 1947, 1955, 1957, and every season from 1960 through 1963. His debut came in 1947 with Patricia Neal headlining as the Leading Lady, under the direction of George Somnes.

Later in his career, Marston made his television debut in the ABC science fiction television series Space Patrol. He guest-starred in television programs including The Love Boat, Taxi, Boots and Saddles, T. J. Hooker, Dynasty, Bourbon Street Beat and Public Defender. He also appeared in films such as Battle Taxi, Star Trek: The Motion Picture, Ring of Fire, The Fearmakers, The Decks Ran Red, Fighter Attack and Fighter Attack.

Marston retired from acting in 1991, last appearing in the film Oscar. After retiring from acting, he taught aqua-aerobics at the Jewish Community Alliance in Jacksonville, Florida.

== Death ==
Marston died on October 18, 2012, in Jacksonville, Florida, at the age of 90.
