= Fiona Hale =

American actress

- Publicity Photo of Fiona Hale
- Born: February 7, 1926; New York City, U.S.
- Died: April 22, 2014 (aged 88)
- Occupation: Actress
- Years active: 1949–2014

Fiona Hale (February 7, 1926 - April 22, 2014) was an American actress. Her career began in 1949 in the movie Harriet Craig. She is known for her roles in Minority Report (2002), The Curious Case of Benjamin Button (2008), and Seven Pounds (2008).

Hale was born in New York City.

== Partial filmography ==
- The Incredible Burt Wonderstone (2013)
- Seven Pounds (2008)
- The Curious Case of Benjamin Button (2008)
- Minority Report (2002)
- Corky Romano (2001)
- Shotgun (1955)
- Interrupted Melody (1955)
- Harriet Craig (1949)
