= Sweetheart of Sigma Chi (film) =

1946 film

- Directed by: Jack Bernhard
- Screenplay by: Michael Jacoby; George Waggner
- Produced by: Jeffrey Bernerd
- Starring: Phil Regan; Elyse Knox; Ross Hunter
- Cinematography: L. William O'Connell
- Edited by: William Austin
- Music by: Edward J. Kay
- Production company: Monogram Pictures
- Distributed by: Monogram Pictures
- Release date: November 16, 1946
- Running time: 76 minutes
- Country: United States
- Language: English

Sweetheart of Sigma Chi is a 1946 American musical comedy film directed by Jack Bernhard and starring Phil Regan, Elyse Knox and Ross Hunter. It was produced and distributed by Monogram Pictures.

== Cast ==
- Phil Regan as Lucky Ryan
- Elyse Knox as Betty Allen
- Phil Brito as Phil Howard
- Ross Hunter as Ted Sloan
- Tom Harmon as Coach
- Paul Guilfoyle as Frankie
- Ann Gillis as Sue (as Anne Gillis)
- Edward Brophy as Arty
- Fred Coby as Bill Ryan (as Fred Colby)
- Alan Hale Jr. as Mike Mitchell
- David Holt as Tommy Carr
- Marjorie Hoerner as Margie
- William Beaudine Jr. as Charlie
- Emmett Vogan Jr. as Emmett
- Ruth Allen as Ruth
- Robert Arthur as Harry Townsend
- Fred Datig Jr. as Fred
- Frankie Carle : and his band
- Slim Gaillard : and his trio

== Production ==
The film was announced in 1946.
