= Hellgate (1952 film) =

1952 film

- Belgian theatrical release poster
- Directed by: Charles Marquis Warren
- Written by: John C. Champion; Charles Marquis Warren
- Produced by: John C. Champion
- Starring: Sterling Hayden; Ward Bond; James Arness
- Cinematography: Ernest W. Miller
- Music by: Paul Dunlap
- Distributed by: Commandeer Films; Lippert Pictures
- Release date: September 4, 1952 (Los Angeles)
- Running time: 87 minutes
- Country: United States
- Language: English

Hellgate is a 1952 American Western film directed by Charles Marquis Warren and starring Sterling Hayden.

== Plot ==
Hellgate Prison is an aptly named facility in the desert where the worst criminals are sent. Hanley, a veterinarian and former Civil War soldier, is falsely accused, convicted of a crime and sentenced to a term in the prison. He clashes with Voorhees, a vicious guard, and Redfield, a mean convict. Hanley devises his exit strategy, which gains added urgency when a rapidly spreading typhus epidemic inflicts the prison population.

== Cast ==
- Sterling Hayden as Gilman S. Hanley
- Joan Leslie as Ellen Hanley
- Ward Bond as Lt. Tod Voorhees
- James Arness as George Redfield
- Peter Coe as Jumper Hall
- John Pickard as Gundy Boyd
- Robert Wilke as Sgt. Maj. Kearn
- Kyle James as Vern Brechene
- Richard Emory as Dan Mott

== Reception ==
Critic John L. Scott of the Los Angeles Times wrote: "This is a grim tale without breaks for comedy relief. ... Performances are top-notch."

== See also ==
- Sterling Hayden filmography
