= Bahama Passage =

1941 film

- Film poster
- Directed by: Edward H. Griffith
- Written by: Nelson Hayes; Virginia Van Upp
- Based on: Dildo Cay by Nelson Hayes
- Produced by: Edward H. Griffith
- Starring: Madeleine Carroll; Sterling Hayden
- Cinematography: Leo Tover; Allen M. Davey
- Edited by: Eda Warren
- Music by: David Buttolph
- Color process: Technicolor
- Production company: Paramount Pictures
- Distributed by: Paramount Pictures
- Release date: 1941
- Running time: 82 minutes
- Country: United States
- Language: English
- Box office: $1.5 million (US rentals)

Bahama Passage is a 1941 American adventure drama romance film directed by Edward H. Griffith and starring Madeleine Carroll and Sterling Hayden. The film was primarily shot on Salt Cay, Turks Islands in Technicolor. It was produced and distributed by Paramount Pictures.

== Plot ==
When his father dies in an accident, Adrian Ainsworth is forced to get a replacement as head of the family salt company on an island in the Caribbean.

His mentally unstable mother firmly believes that her husband was murdered by one of their Bahama workers. Soon a Mr. Delbridge and his daughter Carol arrives to the island to run the company. Adrian is not happy with this solution though, and is reluctant to give Mr. Delbridge complete control of the company affairs. The new boss is quickly unpopular with the rest of the work force, including Adrian's right-hand man Morales, who is hit by Delbridge when he fails to give him the keys to the house. Morales only wants to protect his friend Adrian's interests.

The daughter Carol, a pretty and flirtatious socialite girl, shows a romantic interest in Adrian, unaware that he is in fact married. When she finds out, they become friends, and Adrian gets to know about the state of the company through Carol. Apparently the family business is heading towards bankruptcy.

One day Adrian gets a message that his wife Mary is ill, and goes to Spanish Harbour where she lives alone. He is accompanied by Carol, and when they get to his home, Mary is occupied with another man. She wants to divorce him, tired of living alone on a deserted island.

One night Mr. Delbridge has enough of the islanders when they celebrate a holiday with singing indigenous songs, so he fires his gun at them, which scares Mrs. Ainsworth so much her heart fails. She dies before Adrian is able to return from his estranged wife. Upon his arrival back to the house he learns that Mr. Delbridge has killed a young island boy with his firing.

The islanders avenge their dead son by kidnapping Mr. Delbridge, determined to bring him to justice by taking him to the police. When Adrian and Carol are left alone at the house, they ultimately fall in love.

Morales pays them a visit and tells them that Mr. Delbridge managed to flee from the islanders by jumping overboard on a boat, and is presumed drowned. Adrian wants to get Carol away from the island and all of the bad feelings that seem to be inspired by the place. His friend, Captain Risingwell, tells him that it isn't the place, but the absence of true love that destroyed the people living there.

Adrian changes his mind and brings Carol back with him to the island to spend their future together.

== Cast ==
- Madeleine Carroll as Carol Delbridge
- Sterling Hayden as Adrian Ainsworth (as Stirling Hayden)
- Flora Robson as Mrs. Ainsworth
- Leo G. Carroll as Delbridge
- Mary Anderson as Mary Ainsworth
- Cecil Kellaway as Captain Jack Risingwell
- Leigh Whipper as Morales
- Dorothy Dandridge as Thalia

== Critical reception ==
A review in Variety described it as an "uneventful, talky and boresome drama" noting that "Miss Carroll does her best to overcome the weak tale, but finds the task impossible".

== See also ==
- Sterling Hayden filmography

== Bibliography ==
- Pascoe, John. Madeleine Carroll: Actress and Humanitarian, from The 39 Steps to the Red Cross. McFarland, 2020.
