= The Lives of Jenny Dolan =

- Written by: James Lee; Richard Alan Simmons
- Directed by: Jerry Jameson
- Starring: Shirley Jones; Stephen Boyd; Lynn Carlin; James Darren; Farley Granger; George Grizzard; Ian McShane; Pernell Roberts; Dana Wynter
- Music by: Patrick Williams
- Country of origin: United States
- Original language: English

Production
- Executive producer: Ross Hunter
- Producer: Jacques Mapes
- Cinematography: Matthew F. Leonetti
- Editor: George W. Brooks
- Running time: 100 minutes
- Production companies: Paramount Television; Ross Hunter Productions Inc.

Original release
- Network: NBC
- Release: October 27, 1975

The Lives of Jenny Dolan is a 1975 made-for-television drama film from producer Ross Hunter. It was Hunter's first work for TV.

It was the unsold pilot for a television series.

== Plot ==
Jenny Dolan, a newspaper reporter, is jeopardized by her investigation of an assassination.

== Cast ==
- Shirley Jones as Jenny Dolan
- Stephen Boyd as Joe Rossiter
- Lynn Carlin as Nancy Royce
- James Darren as Orlando
- Farley Granger as David Ames
- George Grizzard as Ralph Stantlow
- David Hedison as Dr. Wes Dolan
- Stephen McNally as Lt. Nesbitt
- Ian McShane as Saunders
- Pernell Roberts as Camera Shop Proprietor
- Percy Rodrigues as Dr. Mallen
- Collin Wilcox as Mrs. Owens
- Dana Wynter as Andrea Hardesty
- Alan Oppenheimer as Springfield

== Reception ==
Synopsis from Modcinema:

Looking like a million dollars in a series of fabulous outfits, Shirley Jones plays Jenny Dolan, an ex-investigative reporter. The widow of a wealthy businessman, Jenny suspects her husband met with foul play, and returns to reporting to prove her theory. She uncovers a political assassination plot, but never does solve her husband's murder… because this made-for-TV movie was the pilot for an unsold series, in which Jenny would have spent each week trying to get at the truth. She also would have gone from one exotic foreign locale to another, with an expensive change of wardrobe for each occasion. It should come as no surprise that Lives of Jenny Dolan was the first TV project of famed "glamour film" producer Ross Hunter.
