= Fighter Attack =

1953 film by Lesley Selander

- Theatrical poster
- Directed by: Lesley Selander
- Written by: Shimon Wincelberg
- Produced by: William A. Calihan Jr.
- Starring: Sterling Hayden; Joy Page; J. Carrol Naish
- Cinematography: Harry Neumann
- Edited by: Stanley Rabjohn; Lester A. Sansom
- Music by: Marlin Skiles
- Production company: Allied Artists Pictures
- Distributed by: Allied Artists Pictures
- Release date: November 29, 1953
- Running time: 80 minutes
- Country: United States
- Language: English

Fighter Attack is a 1953 American World War II film directed by Lesley Selander. The film stars Sterling Hayden, Joy Page and J. Carrol Naish. It reunited Hayden and Selander, who had worked together on Flat Top in 1952. The film is set in Nazi-occupied Italy and involves a U.S. fighter pilot's last sortie, and the help he receives from Italian partisans in an effort to complete his mission after he is shot down in enemy territory.

== Plot ==
Just after World War II, American Steve Pitt (Sterling Hayden) seeks out Father Paolo (David Leonard) at an Italian village. A new priest tells him Paolo was executed by the Germans. Steve recalls the events of 1944, when as a fighter pilot in Corsica, he flew on a last mission over Italy because his friend Captain George Peterson failed to complete his assignment: to blast a tunnel leading to a German ammunition dump. Steve is shot down, however, and parachutes into enemy-held Italy. Getting help from Nina (Joy Page), a young Italian partisan, she brings him to Bruno (J. Carrol Naish), the local partisan leader.

Bruno is afraid of Nazi retaliation if Steve is found with them. When he finds the tunnel, Steve, with Nina's help, convinces the others, including village priest Father Paolo, to help him destroy it. Father Paolo reveals that he has been hiding George Patterson. Before the attack can take place, jealous partisan Aldo (Anthony Caruso) betrays the band to the Germans because Steve is in love with Nina, but is killed himself. The group escapes an ambush and retreats to their cabin hideout.

The next morning, while Steve and George prepare to blow up the tunnel, American aircraft overhead are alerted to its location when Steve lights a flare. While the aircraft bomb the ammunition dump, the Italians attack a German artillery unit, turning the guns on the tunnel, destroying it, but Bruno is killed. Father Paolo and others help Steve and George escape in a small boat, with Steve promising to come back for Nina. As Steve ends his story, the new priest show him that Nina is still alive; the two lovers kiss and embrace.

== Cast ==
L-R: J. Carrol Naish and Sterling Hayden played the central characters in Fighter Attack.

- Sterling Hayden as Major Steve Pitt (Note: During World War II, Hayden served behind the lines as a member of the OSS.)
- J. Carrol Naish as Bruno
- Joy Page as Nina
- Kenneth Tobey as Captain George Patterson
- Anthony Caruso as Aldo
- Frank DeKova as Benedetto
- Paul Fierro as Don Gaetano
- Maurice Jara as Ettore
- Tony Dante as Mario
- David Leonard as Father Paola in the credits (also referred to as Paolo by screen characters)
- Jeffrey Stone as Lt. Gross
- Eddie Firestone P47 Fighter Pilot (uncredited)

== Production ==
Fighter Attack was one of a group of films in the early postwar period that dealt with World War II. The producers relied on the assistance of the USAF and the Department of Defense to provide stock footage of period fighter aircraft. The opening credits indicated, "We desire to express grateful appreciation to the Department of Defense and the United States Air Force for the cooperation which was extended in the production of this picture."

== Reception ==
Fighter Attack "... was pleasingly filmed in the two-color Cinecolor process, as were many Monogram/Allied Artists 'A's of the period." Critics appraised the film as "... just a typical post war action movie with a cliche storyline, cliche action and cliche characters. It isn't necessarily terrible but there are a lot better war movies which you could watch instead." Leonard Maltin described it as "modest". Alun Evans, in commenting on its fast pacing in an 80-minute format, simply described it as "brisk".

== See also ==
- Sterling Hayden filmography
