= Ted de Corsia =

American actor (1903–1973)

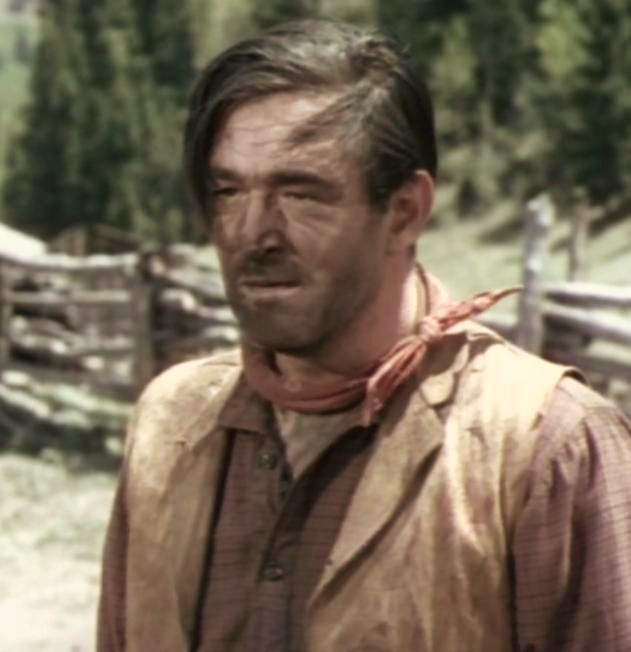
- De Corsia in Vengeance Valley (1951)
- Born: Edward Gildea De Corsia; September 29, 1903; New York City, U.S.
- Died: April 11, 1973 (aged 69); Los Angeles, California, U.S.
- Occupation: Actor
- Years active: 1928–1972
- Spouses: Mary Robertson (m. 1934; div. 1935) Rachel Thurber (m. 1939, divorced)
- Children: 2

Edward Gildea De Corsia (September 29, 1903 – April 11, 1973) was an American radio, film, and television actor, best remembered for his chilling debut in The Lady from Shanghai (1947), as the ex-wrestler murderer Willie Garzah in the film The Naked City (1948), and as a gangster who turned state's evidence in the film The Enforcer (1951).

== Early life ==
Edward Gildea De Corsia was born on September 29, 1903, in New York City. He grew up in Manhattan and began his career as a radio performer in the late 1920s, working on various network dramas before transitioning to stage and film work. Before moving to Hollywood, de Corsia became known for his deep voice and commanding presence in crime and mystery radio programs, including The Shadow and Gang Busters.

== Career ==
=== Radio ===
De Corsia was a member of the cast of Blackstone Plantation. He starred in the title role on Mike Hammer and played Sergeant Velie on The Adventures of Ellery Queen. He also voiced roles on Family Theater, The March of Time, Cavalcade of America, Gang Busters, and The Shadow.

=== Film ===
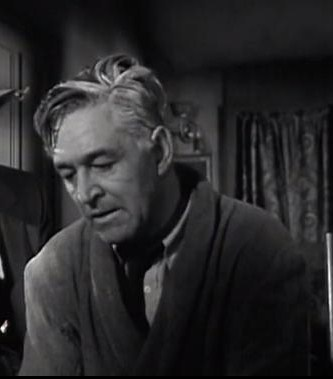
Ted de Corsia in The Big Combo (1955)

He made his film debut in Orson Welles' The Lady from Shanghai (1947) and went on to make a career playing villains and gangsters in 1940s and 1950s films, including The Naked City (1948), The Enforcer (1951), Crime Wave (1954), The Big Combo (1955), The Killing (1956), Baby Face Nelson (1957), Slightly Scarlet (1956), and The Joker is Wild (1957).

In his last feature, The Outside Man (1972) with Ann-Margret and Angie Dickinson, his character, the mobster Victor, is killed off early in the film, but he later appears as his embalmed corpse, posed in a chair, holding a cigar.

=== Television ===
In the late 1950s and 1960s, he appeared in a number of television series, mostly westerns. He appeared in S2 E15 of Wanted: Dead or Alive playing George Winters in "Chain Gang" which aired 12/10/1959.

He was featured on three episodes of the CBS courtroom drama series Perry Mason, including the episodes "The Case of the Drifting Dropout" (1964), in which he played murder victim Mort Lynch, and "The Case of the Positive Negative" (1966), in the role of murder victim George Emory. Other notable television series appearances included The Lone Ranger; The Untouchables; The Twilight Zone; Sea Hunt; I Dream of Jeannie; The Outer Limits, and The Monkees

== Filmography ==
Year	Title	Role	Notes
1947	The Lady from Shanghai	Sidney Broome	
1948	The Naked City	Willie Garzah	
1949	The Life of Riley	Norman	
1949	Neptune's Daughter	Lukie Luzette	
1949	It Happens Every Spring	Manager Jimmy Dolan	
1949	Mr. Soft Touch	Rainey	
1950	The Outriders	Bye	
1950	Cargo to Capetown	Rhys	
1950	Three Secrets	Del Prince	
1951	The Enforcer	Joe Rico	
1951	Vengeance Valley	Herb Backett	
1951	A Place In The Sun	Judge R.S. Oldendorff	
1951	Inside the Walls of Folsom Prison	Warden Ben Rickey	
1951	New Mexico	Acoma, Indian Chief	
1951	Crazy Over Horses	Duke	
1952	Captain Pirate	Captain Easterling	
1952	The Savage	Iron Breast	
1952	The Turning Point	Harrigan	
1953	Man in the Dark	Lefty	
1953	Ride, Vaquero!	Sheriff Parker	
1953	Hot News	Dino Rizzo	
1953	Crime Wave	'Doc' Penny	
1954	20,000 Leagues Under the Sea	Captain Farragut	
1955	The Big Combo	Ralph Bettini	
1955	Man with the Gun	'Frenchy' Lescaux	
1955	Kismet	Police Sub-altern	
1956	The Conqueror	Kumlek	
1956	Slightly Scarlet	Solly Caspar	
1956	The Steel Jungle	Steve Marlin	
1956	The Kettles in the Ozarks	Professor	
1956	Mohawk	Indian Chief Kowanen	
1956	The Killing	Patrolman Randy Kennan	
1956	Showdown at Abilene	Dan Claudius	
1956	Dance with Me, Henry	Big Frank	
1957	Gunfight at the O.K. Corral	Shanghai Pierce	
1957	The Lawless Eighties	Grat Bandas	
1957	The Midnight Story	Lieutenant Kilrain	
1957	The Joker is Wild	Georgie Parker	
1957	Gun Battle at Monterey	Max Reno	
1957	Man on the Prowl	Detective	
1957	Baby Face Nelson	Rocca	
1958	Handle with Care	Sam Lawrence	
1958	South Seas Adventure	Supplemental Narration	Voice
1958	Enchanted Island	Captain Vangs	
1958	The Buccaneer	Captain Rumbo	
1959	Inside the Mafia	Augie Martello	
1960	Oklahoma Territory	Chief Buffalo Horn	
1960	Noose for a Gunman	Jack Cantrell	
1960	From the Terrace	Mr. Ralph W. Benziger	
1960	Spartacus	Legionnaire	Uncredited
1962	It's Only Money	Patrolman	
1964	The Quick Gun	Jud Spangler	
1964	Blood on the Arrow	Jud	
1965	The Money Trap	Police Captain	Uncredited
1966	Nevada Smith	Hudson, Bartender	
1967	The King's Pirate	Captain McTigue	
1968	5 Card Stud	Eldon Bates	
1970	The Delta Factor	Ames	
1972	The Outside Man	Victor	(final film role)

== Selected television ==
Year	Title	Role	Notes
1955	The Lone Ranger	Sam Slater	Season 4 Episode 34: "Gold Freight"
1957	Have Gun - Will Travel	Chief Harry Blackfoot	Season 1 Episode 13: "The Englishman"
1957	Official Detective	Lieutenant Evans	Season 1 Episode 13: "Bombing Terror"
1958	Official Detective	Lieutenant Evans	Season 1 Episode 39: "Bombing Terror"
1959	The Twilight Zone	Marty Sall	Season 1 Episode 4: "The Sixteen-Millimeter Shrine"
1959	Alfred Hitchcock Presents	Police Inspector Salva	Season 5 Episode 9: "Dead Weight"
1960	Wanted: Dead or Alive	Arthur Barchester	Season 3, Episode 10 "The Medicine Man"
1961	Alfred Hitchcock Presents	Lieutenant Christensen	Season 7 Episode 7: "You Can't Be a Little Girl All Your Life"
1961	Rawhide	Sheriff	Season 3 Episode 24: "Incident of the Lost Idol"
1964	The Alfred Hitchcock Hour	Police Lieutenant Herlie	Season 2 Episode 13: "The Magic Shop"
1964	The Twilight Zone	Foreman Dickerson	Season 5 Episode 33: "The Brain Center at Whipple's"
1966	Get Smart	Mr. Natz	Season 1, Episode 19 "Back to the Old Drawing Board"
1967	Get Smart	Spinoza	Season 3, Episode 8 "When Good Fellows Get Together"
1967	The Monkees	Frank	Season 2 Episode 12: "Hitting the High Seas"
