= The Best Place to Be =

- Genre: Drama
- Directed by: David Miller
- Starring: Donna Reed; Efrem Zimbalist Jr. Mildred Dunnock
- Music by: Henry Mancini
- Country of origin: United States
- Original language: English

Production
- Executive producers: Aaron Spelling; Leonard Goldberg
- Producers: Ross Hunter; Jacques Mapes
- Cinematography: Terry K. Meade
- Editor: Richard Bracken
- Running time: 195 min. 240 min.
- Production company: Ross Hunter Productions Inc.

Original release
- Network: NBC
- Release: May 27, 1979

The Best Place to Be is a 1979 American TV film produced by Ross Hunter. It marked Donna Reed's return to acting after 13 years. Hunter planned a sequel, but it was not filmed.

== Plot ==
A widowed mother has an affair with a younger man.

== Cast ==
- Donna Reed as Sheila Callahan
- Efrem Zimbalist Jr. as Bill Reardan
- Mildred Dunnock as Rose Price
- Betty White as Sally Cantrell
- John Phillip Law as Dr. Gary Mancini
- Stephanie Zimbalist as Maryanne Callahan
- Michael J Shannon as Patrick Callahan
- Gregory Harrison as Rick Jawlosky
- Timothy Hutton as Tommy Callahan
- Lloyd Bochner as Bob Stockwood
- Madlyn Rhue as Emily Stockwood
- Rick Jason as Paul Bellinger
- Alice Backes as Kitty Rawlings

== Production ==
Reed said of her character, "In a way, she is a child-woman. She must learn to grow up and earn her own way. It's a long, hard battle. The children get into trouble. She takes on the wrong lover, a younger man. It's really about a woman who grows up enough to know the difference between a really good, old-fashioned man and a rogue and a playboy. She learns the lesson and finally meets a man who is right for her."

== Reception ==
One review called it "a two part corpse".
