= Woman on the Run =

1950 film by Norman Foster

- Film poster by Reynold Brown
- Directed by: Norman Foster
- Screenplay by: Alan Campbell; Norman Foster; Ross Hunter (dialogue)
- Based on: "Man on the Run"; 1948 story in American Magazine by Sylvia Tate
- Produced by: Howard Welsch
- Starring: Ann Sheridan; Dennis O'Keefe
- Cinematography: Hal Mohr
- Edited by: Otto Ludwig
- Music by: Arthur Lange; Emil Newman
- Color process: Black and white
- Production company: Fidelity Pictures Corporation
- Distributed by: Universal Pictures
- Release date: November 29, 1950 (New York City)
- Running time: 77 minutes
- Country: United States
- Language: English

Woman on the Run is a 1950 American crime film noir directed by Norman Foster and starring Ann Sheridan and Dennis O'Keefe. The film was based on the April 1948 short story "Man on the Run" by Sylvia Tate.

The film exists in the public domain and was restored and preserved by the UCLA Film & Television Archive.

== Plot ==
Woman on the Run.

In San Francisco, artist Frank Johnson observes the gunshot murder of an important trial witness by a gangster seeking extortion money. Noticing Frank, the murderer takes shots at him. When the police arrive, Inspector Martin Ferris learns that Frank, the sole witness, could identify the killer in a lineup, so he detains Frank to be given protective custody. When Frank sees bullet holes in the chest area of his shadow on a nearby wall and realizes how close he had come to death, he panics and surreptitiously escapes the police.

Ferris learns from Eleanor Johnson, Frank's wife, that the marriage is greatly strained and that Frank has disclosed little about his life to her. She informs Ferris that Frank has a longstanding habit of running from situations and events.

Reporter Danny Legget insinuates himself into Eleanor's life and assists her in the search for Frank. Danny makes romantic advances, but Eleanor rediscovers her feelings for Frank the longer that he is away. Ferris and the police are also seeking Frank, and undercover officers tail Eleanor wherever she goes.

At a Chinese nightclub that Frank frequents, a waiter gives Eleanor a note left by Frank. In the letter, Frank tells Eleanor that he will send a letter to his workplace informing her of his location. Danny learns that Suzie, a Chinese dancer, has a sketch of him that was given to her by Frank, so he steals the drawing. Soon after, Suzie falls from a window to her death, and the nightclub staff cannot believe that she would commit suicide.

At another bar, Eleanor finds another clue in Frank's painting on the wall. At Frank's workplace, a department store, Eleanor finds the letter, which states that Frank is at "the place where he first lost her." Eleanor realizes that the location is on the beach near an amusement park. Eleanor and Danny rush to the beach, where Frank is finishing a large sand sculpture.

With Eleanor taking a terrifying roller coaster ride to elude the police, Danny is revealed as the villain as he confronts Frank at gunpoint. Eleanor rushes to the scene upon hearing a gunshot and sees Danny's body floating in the water. She is tearfully reunited with Frank.

== Cast ==
- Ann Sheridan as Eleanor Johnson
- Dennis O'Keefe as Daniel Legget
- Robert Keith as Inspector Martin Ferris
- John Qualen as Maibus
- Frank Jenks as Detective Shaw
- Ross Elliott as Frank Johnson
- Jane Liddell as messenger girl
- Joan Shawlee as tipsy blonde in bar (as Joan Fulton)
- J. Farrell MacDonald as sea captain
- Steven Geray as Dr. Hohler
- Victor Sen Yung as Sam
- Reiko Sato as Suzie (as Rako Sato)
- Syd Saylor as Sullivan, the bartender
- Tom Dillon as Joe Gordon (as Thomas P. Dillon)

== Production ==
Ann Sheridan was announced as the female lead in January 1950, with the film's working title as Man on the Run. In February, it was reported that the producers were facing problems with the script and had changed writers.

Sheridan was reported to have negotiated to receive a large portion of the film's profits and was paid $150,000 for her work. Twentieth Century-Fox paid Fidelity Pictures $50,000 to delay production of the film while Sheridan completed work on Stella. Rumors circulated that she was ill after having transitioned directly from Stella to Woman on the Run, which she vehemently denied.

Reiko Sato was cast after Ann Sheridan saw her dancing at a nightclub.

Production for Woman on the Run began in early May. The film was shot on location in San Francisco, although some night scenes set in San Francisco were filmed in the Court Hill section of Los Angeles. The amusement park and roller coaster scenes were filmed at Ocean Park Pier in Santa Monica. Sheridan, who had a great fear of roller coasters dating back to a childhood accident at an amusement park, took eight full rides on the Ocean Park Pier roller coaster during the course of filming the sequence. Filming wrapped in mid-June 1950.

Ross Hunter worked as dialogue director for the film as well as for several other films starring Sheridan at Universal.

According to film noir historian Eddie Muller, much of the film's dialogue was improvised, a rarity for the era, and no continuity script was completed.

== Reception ==
In a contemporary review for The New York Times, critic Bosley Crowther wrote:

Since it never pretends to be more than it is, "Woman on the Run" ... is melodrama of solid if not spectacular proportions. Working on what obviously was a modest budget, its independent producers may not have achieved a superior chase in this yarn about the search by the police and the fugitive's wife for a missing witness to a gangland killing. But as a combination of sincere characterizations, plausible dialogue, suspense and the added documentary attribute of a scenic tour through San Francisco, "Woman on the Run" may be set several notches above the usual cops-and-corpses contributions from the Coast ... "Woman on the Run" will not win prizes but it does make crime enjoyable.

Los Angeles Times reviewer Philip K. Scheuer wrote:

For a Hitchcock-type thriller ... 'Woman on the Run' is really quite a presentable little affair, directed (after one of the talkiest openings on record) with fair imagination by Norman Foster, who also collaborated on the screen play. His roller-coaster finish, at any rate, demonstrates what applied cinematics can do to make the spectator breathe hard over a situation which, if he were thinking hard instead, would quickly establish itself as coming mighty close to the preposterous.

== Restoration ==
In 2003, a pristine print of the film was located in Universal's vault, but it was destroyed in the 2008 Universal lot fire. The film was thus believed to be lost, with the only extant copies being numerous poor-quality VHS transfers typical of public-domain films. However, the film's negative and soundtrack were found in the British Film Institute's collection, and the Film Noir Foundation and Hollywood Foreign Press Association funded a complete restoration by the UCLA Film and Television Archive. The restored film premiered in August 2015.

== See also ==
- Public domain film
- List of American films of 1950
- List of films in the public domain in the United States
