= Leuchtturm des Chaos =

1983 documentary movie

- Directed by: Manfred Blank; Wolf-Eckart Bühler
- Written by: Manfred Blank; Wolf-Eckart Bühler
- Starring: Sterling Hayden; Wolf-Eckart Bühler; Manfred Blank
- Cinematography: Bernd Fiedler
- Edited by: Manfred Blank
- Production company: Red Harvest Film
- Distributed by: Buhler Films (US); Prokino Filmverleih (West Germany)
- Release dates: 13 October 1983 (U.S.); 21 October 1983 (West Germany)
- Running time: 119 minutes
- Country: West Germany
- Language: English

Leuchtturm des Chaos (English: Pharos of Chaos or Lighthouse of Chaos) is a 1983 documentary profile of the American actor Sterling Hayden (1916–1986).

== Synopsis ==
The film features discussions with Hayden concerning his life and career, intercut with clips and stills from his films. It follows the actor through several long and digressive afternoon conversations with the German filmmakers aboard the barge in France on which he was living. Hayden smokes hashish and drinks heavily throughout, telling the filmmakers that they "have a record of exactly what alcoholism is". Hayden recounts his shame at having co-operated with the House Un-American Activities Committee during the Second Red Scare, his pride in his achievements as a sailor, and adopts a scornful attitude toward his illustrious career as a Hollywood film icon.

== Critical reception ==
The film was shown at the 1983 Edinburgh Film Festival, where it was one of a few independent films singled out for praise by critic Steve McIntyre in an otherwise disappointing event. In a review for The New York Times, critic Janet Maslin cited the film as an example of "documentary film making ... at its most laissez faire", lamenting that "Every discussion is allowed to proceed far beyond its natural conclusion". She criticised the filmmakers' reluctance to rein in Hayden's "diffuseness of thought", "stilted" cinematography, inclusion of trivial and uninteresting details from the interviews, and their nonchalant and distanced attitude toward the actor. Maslin's review concludes:

This makes for an unhappy spectacle all around, especially since Mr. Hayden seems excited about the film project and eager to communicate his thoughts and his history. Had the film makers carefully conveyed less about this tortured yet still-commanding figure, their film would undoubtedly have revealed more.
