= Emil Newman =

- Born: January 20, 1911; New Haven, Connecticut, U.S.
- Died: August 30, 1984 (aged 73) Los Angeles, California, U.S.
- Occupations: Composer, conductor
- Years active: 1940–1980

Emil Newman (January 20, 1911 – August 30, 1984) was an American music director and conductor who worked on more than 200 films and TV series. He was nominated for an Oscar for his musical direction on the classic Sun Valley Serenade (1941), contributing to the Newmans being the most nominated Academy Award extended family, with a collective 95 nominations in various music categories.

== Biography ==
A native of Connecticut, Newman entered films in 1940 as the musical director on 13 films. He was credited on 25 films in 1941 and 28 in 1942, one of which, Whispering Ghosts, contained his first (uncredited) contribution as a composer. He had 15 titles in 1943, including "Musical Direction" (screen credit) for the all-black musical Stormy Weather and the 20th Century Fox wartime film Chetniks! The Fighting Guerrillas, 19 in 1944, 17 in 1945 and 16 in 1946, including Hugo Friedhofer's Academy Award score for The Best Years of Our Lives, which he also conducted. Between 1950 and 1965, Newman was the composer on 23 films, most of which were lower-budget B movies, although they also included prestigious pictures such as Hondo (1953). He also provided the music for numerous 1950s TV shows.

Newman died in Woodland Hills, a suburb of Los Angeles. He is interred at Forest Lawn Memorial Park in Glendale, California.

== Family connections, marriage and children ==
Emil Newman's older brother was renowned film composer Alfred Newman (1901–1970), whose children Maria, David and Thomas are also composers. His younger brother was another famous film composer, Lionel Newman (1916–1989), whose grandson Joey Newman is a film and TV composer. Another brother, Irving, was the father of still another acclaimed film musical personality, songwriter and composer Randy Newman. His brother Marc Newman was a film agent representing some of Hollywoods most noted composers including John Williams, Jerry Goldsmith, Dave Grusin and Marvin Hamlisch. His brother Robert V. Newman was a studio executive and former President of John Wayne's Batjac Productions. Their family is of Jewish descent.

Newman was married to bit-part actress Eva May Hoffman aka Eve Farrell. They had two children, daughter Arleen (born 1939) and son William Robert (born August 14, 1937).

William Robert Newman is the father of Jill Newman, Sarah Devries, William Marcus and Jaice Newman. The offspring of Arleen Newman and Dennis Crosby (son of Bing Crosby) are Erin Colleen Crosby and Kelly Lee Crosby. Dennis also adopted Katherine Denise Buelle, Arleen's daughter by her first husband Mike Buelle.

== Selected filmography ==
Year	Title	Director(s)	Studio(s)	Notes
1942	Time to Kill	Herbert I. Leeds	20th Century Fox	
1942	Whispering Ghosts	Alfred L. Werker	20th Century Fox	
1942	The Magnificent Dope	Walter Lang	20th Century Fox	
1942	Careful, Soft Shoulder	Oliver H.P. Garrett	20th Century Fox	
1942	Dr. Renault's Secret	Harry Lachman	20th Century Fox	
1942	The Undying Monster	John Brahm	20th Century Fox	
1942	Quiet Please, Murder	John Larkin	20th Century Fox	
1942	Over My Dead Body	Malcolm St. Clair	20th Century Fox	
1943	Tonight We Raid Calais	John Brahm	20th Century Fox	
1943	Dixie Dugan	Otto Brower	20th Century Fox	
1948	Jungle Patrol	Joseph M. Newman	20th Century Fox	
1948	A Song Is Born	Howard Hawks	Samuel Goldwyn Productions	uncredited
1950	Guilty of Treason	Felix E. Feist	Eagle-Lion Films	
1950	Woman on the Run	Norman Foster	Universal Pictures	
1951	Cry Danger	Robert Parrish	RKO Pictures	
1951	The Groom Wore Spurs	Richard Whorf	Universal Pictures	
1951	Journey into Light	Stuart Heisler	20th Century Fox	
1952	The Lady Says No	Frank Ross	United Artists	
1952	Japanese War Bride	King Vidor	20th Century Fox	
1952	Rancho Notorious	Fritz Lang	RKO Pictures	
1952	The San Francisco Story	Robert Parrish	Warner Bros.	
1952	Big Jim McLain	Edward Ludwig	Warner Bros.	
1953	War Paint	Lesley Selander	United Artists	
1953	Island in the Sky	William A. Wellman	Warner Bros.	
1953	99 River Street	Phil Karlson	United Artists	
1953	Hondo	John Farrow	Warner Bros.	
1954	Beachhead	Stuart Heisler	United Artists	
1954	Southwest Passage	Ray Nazarro	United Artists	
1954	The Mad Magician	John Brahm	Columbia Pictures	
1954	Ring of Fear	James Edward Grant	Warner Bros.	
1955	The Naked Street	Maxwell Shane	United Artists	
1957	Death in Small Doses	Joseph M. Newman	Allied Artists Pictures	
1957	The Iron Sheriff	Sidney Salkow	United Artists	
1957	Chicago Confidential	Sidney Salkow	United Artists	
1958	Hong Kong Confidential	Edward L. Cahn	United Artists	
1958	Unwed Mother	Walter Doniger	Allied Artists Pictures	
1959	Riot in Juvenile Prison	Edward L. Cahn	United Artists	
1965	The Great Sioux Massacre	Sidney Salkow	Columbia Pictures	with Edward B. Powell
