= Journey into Light =

1951 film

- Theatrical release poster
- Directed by: Stuart Heisler
- Written by: story: Anson Bond screenplay: Stephanie Nordli; Irving Shulman
- Produced by: Joseph Bernhard; Anson Bond
- Starring: Sterling Hayden; Viveca Lindfors; Thomas Mitchell
- Cinematography: Elwood Bredell
- Edited by: Terry Morse
- Music by: Paul Dunlap; Emil Newman
- Distributed by: Twentieth Century-Fox
- Release date: October 4, 1951 (New York)
- Running time: 87 minutes
- Country: United States
- Language: English

Journey into Light is a 1951 American crime film noir directed by Stuart Heisler and starring Sterling Hayden.

== Plot ==
Rev. John Burrows, a small-town ordained minister, envisions himself with a larger congregation. He is mortified when his wife drunkenly interrupts a sermon and becomes despondent after her suicide.

Burrows travels to Los Angeles for a fresh start but becomes a vagrant on Skid Row and is arrested for public intoxication. Con man Gandy finds him a bed at a flophouse, and street preacher Doc Thorssen and his blind daughter Christine take Burrows to a mission.

Christine falls in love with Burrows, enjoying his discussions of the spirit and the soul but knowing little of his past. One day, she is struck by a streetcar and knocked unconscious, causing Burrows to once again question his faith. He ultimately accepts the Lord's will and is offered a better place to live and preach. Burrows decides that he is better suited to the mission, with Christine by his side.

== Cast ==
- Sterling Hayden as Rev. John Burrows
- Viveca Lindfors as Christine Thorssen
- Thomas Mitchell as Gandy
- Ludwig Donath as "Doc" Thorssen
- H. B. Warner as Wiz, the Wino
- Jane Darwell as Mack
- John Berkes as Racky
- Peggy Webber as Jane Burrows
- Paul Guilfoyle as Fanatic

== Production ==
In a contemporary review for The New York Times, critic Oscar Godbout called the film "a sermon without fire" and wrote: "Stuart Heisler, the director, made an heroic attempt to show the ravaging doubt that time and again knocked Hayden flat. Merely showing, however, even with authentic scenes of derelict-laden gutters, is not necessarily convincing. Hayden is not a truly tragic figure, for while he tells us that fate, God and society have given him some monumental lumps, and that he'd prefer to sit out the dance of life in the gutter, he does not make us believe that his fall was inevitable."

== See also ==
- Sterling Hayden filmography
