= Don Ricardo Returns =

1946 film

- Directed by: Terry O. Morse
- Written by: Duncan Renaldo (as Renault Duncan); Jack DeWitt
- Based on: The Curse of Capistrano by Johnston McCulley
- Produced by: James S. Burkett
- Starring: Fred Coby; Martin Garralaga
- Cinematography: Vincent J. Farrar; Ben Kline; Morrison B. Paul
- Edited by: George McGuire
- Distributed by: Producers Releasing Corporation
- Release date: 1946
- Running time: 63 minutes
- Country: United States
- Language: English

Don Ricardo Returns is a 1946 American western drama film.

== Plot ==
After having been abducted and sent away on a ship in 1835, Don Ricardo escapes and makes his way back to Alta California. He returns to exact revenge on those who kidnapped him and stole his land.

== Cast ==
- Fred Coby – Don Ricardo
- Martin Garralaga – Miguel Porcoreno
- Anthony Warde – Don Luera
- Lita Baron (billed as Isabella) – Dorotea
- Michael Visaroff – Captain Martinez
- Paul Newlan as Lugo the Huge
