= A Guy, a Gal and a Pal =

1945 film by Budd Boetticher

- Directed by: Budd Boetticher
- Screenplay by: Gerald Drayson Adams
- Story by: Monte Brice
- Produced by: Wallace MacDonald
- Starring: Ross Hunter; Lynn Merrick; George Meeker
- Cinematography: Glen Geno
- Edited by: Otto Meyer
- Production company: Columbia Pictures
- Distributed by: Columbia Pictures
- Release date: March 8, 1945
- Running time: 62 minutes
- Country: United States
- Language: English

A Guy, a Gal and a Pal is a 1945 American comedy-drama romance film directed by Budd Boetticher (as Oscar Boetticher Jr.) and starring Ross Hunter and Lynn Merrick.

== Plot ==
A young woman devises a clever scheme to secure a train reservation by pretending to be married to a stranger.

== Cast ==
- Ross Hunter as Jimmy Jones
- Lynn Merrick as Helen Carter
- Ted Donaldson as Butch
- George Meeker as Granville Breckenridge
- Jack Norton as Norton
- Will Stanton as Barclay

== See also ==
- List of American films of 1945
