= Gun Battle at Monterey =

1957 American film by Carl K. Hittleman and Sidney Franklin

- Film poster
- Directed by: Carl K. Kittleman; Sidney Franklin (as Sidney Franklin, Jr.)
- Screenplay by: Jack Leonard; Lawrence Resner
- Produced by: Carl K. Hittleman
- Starring: Sterling Hayden
- Cinematography: Harry Neumann
- Edited by: Harry Neumann
- Music by: Robert Wiley Miller
- Color process: Black and white
- Production company: C. B. Pictures
- Distributed by: Allied Artists Pictures
- Release date: October 27, 1957
- Running time: 67 minutes
- Country: United States
- Language: English

Gun Battle at Monterey is a 1957 American Western film directed by Carl K. Hittleman and Sidney Franklin and starring Sterling Hayden.

== Plot ==
After he and his partner, Reno (Ted de Corsia), hold up a bank, Turner (Sterling Hayden) decides he wants to branch out on his own. When he tells Reno, Reno shoots him and makes off with the money. But Turner doesn't die — rather, he is discovered and mended by a beautiful Mexican woman named Maria (Pamela Duncan). After he is fully recovered, Turner sets off to exact his revenge on Reno, vowing never to rest until Reno is dead and he's recovered his share of the loot.

== Cast ==
- Sterling Hayden as Jay Turner / John York
- Pamela Duncan as Maria Salvador
- Ted de Corsia as Max Reno
- Mary Beth Hughes as Cleo
- Lee Van Cleef as Kirby
- Charles Cane as Sheriff Claude Mundy
- Pat Comiskey as Frank
- Byron Foulger as Carson
- Mauritz Hugo as Charley
- I. Stanford Jolley as Idwall

== See also ==
- List of American films of 1957
