= The Iron Sheriff =

1957 film by Sidney Salkow

- Theatrical release poster
- Directed by: Sidney Salkow
- Written by: Seeleg Lester
- Produced by: Edward Small (executive); Jerome C. Robinson
- Starring: Sterling Hayden
- Cinematography: Kenneth Peach
- Edited by: Grant Whytock
- Music by: Emil Newman; Ernest Gold (uncredited)
- Production company: Grand Productions
- Distributed by: United Artists
- Release date: April 1957
- Running time: 73 minutes
- Country: United States
- Language: English

The Iron Sheriff is a 1957 American Western film starring Sterling Hayden.

== Plot ==
A stagecoach is robbed in South Dakota and its driver is killed. A dying man, Gene Walden, tells the sheriff, Sam Galt, that Sam's son Benjie shot the driver. Benjie is engaged to be married to Walden's daughter. Benjie is placed under arrest. Newspaper publisher Phil Quincy demands to know what Walden said, but Sam will not say. Quincy and the sheriff are in love with the same woman, Claire, whose father was a lawman killed in the line of duty.

Sam brings in a prominent lawyer, Roger Pollock, to defend his son, and hires a detective, Sutherland, to help find the real culprits. In time, all evidence points to Benjie being the killer; against his lawyer's wishes, Sam testifies to what Walden told him. Benjie is found guilty and sentenced to hang.

Coins from the robbery are found in Kathy's hope chest. Kathy's father, Walden, robbed the stagecoach because his health was failing and he wanted his daughter to have enough money to support herself. Leveret, a telegraph operator who knew the stage's schedule, ambushed it and murdered the driver shortly afterward, not knowing that the money had already been stolen. Walden honestly thought Benjie had committed the murder. Sam manages to bring Leveret to justice in time to save his son.

== Cast ==
- Sterling Hayden as Sam Galt
- Constance Ford as Claire
- John Dehner as Pollock
- Kent Taylor as Quincy
- King Donovan as Leveret
- Kathleen Nolan as Kathy
- Darryl Hickman as Ben Galt
- Mort Mills as Sutherland
- Walter Sande as Marshal Ellison
- Peter Miller as Jackson Gallagher
- I. Stanford Jolley as Eugene Walden

== Production ==
The film was originally known as The Trial of Benjie Galt. Filming started 22 October 1956.

== See also ==
- List of American films of 1957
