= Flat Top (film) =

1952 film

- Directed by: Lesley Selander
- Written by: Steve Fisher
- Produced by: Walter Mirisch
- Starring: Sterling Hayden; Richard Carlson
- Cinematography: Harry Neumann
- Edited by: William Austin
- Music by: Marlin Skiles
- Distributed by: Monogram Pictures
- Release dates: November 11, 1952 (San Francisco); December 5, 1952 (New York)
- Running time: 85 minutes
- Country: United States
- Language: English

Flat Top (also released as Eagles of the Fleet) is a 1952 American drama war film filmed in Cinecolor, directed by Lesley Selander and starring Sterling Hayden, Richard Carlson, Jack Larson, Phyllis Coates and William Phipps. The film earned William Austin an Academy Award nomination for Best Film Editing in 1953.

== Plot ==
Aboard an aircraft carrier near the coast during the Korean War, Commander Collier is in control. When asked about how he first handled his job, he remembers World War II. In flashback form, Collier recounts the war in the Pacific, working flight operations on the carrier and preparing a group of fighter pilots for the tough fight to come against the Japanese, including the amphibious invasion of the island of Leyte and the Battle of Leyte Gulf, the largest naval battle in history.

== Cast ==
- Sterling Hayden as Cmdr. Dan Collier
- Richard Carlson as Lt. Joe Rodgers
- William Phipps as Red Kelley (as Bill Phipps)
- John Bromfield as Ens. Snakehips McKay
- Keith Larsen as Ens. Barney Smith / Barney Oldfield
- William Schallert as Ens. Longfellow
- Todd Karns as Judge
- Phyllis Coates as Dorothy Collier
- Dave Willock as Willie
- Walter Coy as Air Group Commander
- Jack Larson as "Scuttlebutt" Sailor

== Release ==
The film's world premiere was held in San Francisco on November 11, 1952.

== Reception ==
In a contemporary review for The New York Times, critic Howard Thompson wrote: "'Flat Top' holds nothing new or stimulating in the way of entertainment. ... Steve .Fisher's scenario, full of hollow-sounding dialogue and clichés, focuses on a battered standby—the upper echelon feud and its effect on a standard assortment of rookie pilots. And it adds up to a light variation of our worn old friend, 'The Dawn Patrol.'"

== See also ==
- Sterling Hayden filmography
