= Deadly Strangers =

1974 film by Sidney Hayers

- British theatrical poster
- Directed by: Sidney Hayers
- Written by: Philip Levene (original Story and Screenplay)
- Produced by: Peter Miller
- Starring: Hayley Mills; Simon Ward; Sterling Hayden
- Cinematography: Graham Edgar
- Edited by: Barry Peters
- Music by: Ron Goodwin
- Production company: Sihouette Fims
- Distributed by: Fox-Rank (UK)
- Release date: 27 March 1975 (London)
- Running time: 88 minutes
- Country: United Kingdom
- Language: English

Deadly Strangers (also known as Silhouettes) is a 1975 British psychological thriller film directed by Sidney Hayers and starring Hayley Mills, Simon Ward and Sterling Hayden. It was written by Philip Levene.

== Plot ==
An unseen dangerous patient escapes Greenwood Mental Hospital killing or injuring two staff. Soon afterwards, in a private house, a couple discovers that their bedroom has been burgled. A motorist stops at a telephone box, gets out to make a call, and his unattended car is stolen by an unseen thief who runs over the owner, killing him.

The next day a man in his thirties, Stephen Slade, notices an attractive young woman, Belle Adams, in a pub, and when she is given a lift by a lorry driver, he follows her in his own car, which is the same colour and make (an Austin Maxi) as seen in the earlier murder scene. The lorry driver attempts to rape the girl but she escapes and is rescued by Stephen.

Belle wishes to catch a train at a nearby station and Stephen drives her there; but on arrival he untruthfully claims her train is not running and offers to drive her to her destination instead.

With Stephen not being too forthcoming on his own background, the trip focuses on what they are both hiding. Flashbacks gradually reveal that Stephen is a voyeur deeply into sexual perversions, and that Belle is an orphan who was a victim of sexual abuse on the part of her uncle who used to watch her undress through peepholes in the wall and walk in on her as she bathed. At an isolated petrol station staffed only by one young woman, Stephen fills up his tank, disappears for a while in the petrol station ostensibly to make a telephone call, and then rejoins Belle in the car, and they drive off. The next scene shows the petrol station attendant murdered.

On the road, Stephen and Belle are keen to avoid police checks and roadblocks, at first because Stephen was drinking alcohol, and then because the couple are harassed by two young motorcyclists and Stephen knocks one of them into the roadside where he lies motionless, presumably injured or dead. To avoid detection Stephen and Belle sleep in the car. On waking the next morning, Stephen notices Belle has disappeared and drives off to find her, assuming disloyalty. She however has simply been shopping for breakfast and so is obliged to catch a lift from aging Malcolm Robarts. Before long Stephen reunites with Belle, leaving Robarts alone. Upon seeing a newspaper headline, Robarts tries to chase them but loses them.

The film culminates with the couple spending the night at a hotel. A flashback reveals the truth: after sexual abuse by her uncle during her orphaned childhood, Belle snapped and murdered her uncle, which resulted in her confinement in Greenwood Mental Hospital. Now, Belle is finally arrested by the police, but not before she murders Stephen. The title is explained: they were both deadly strangers.

== Cast ==
- Hayley Mills as Belle Adams
- Simon Ward as Stephen Slade
- Sterling Hayden as Malcolm Robarts
- Ken Hutchison as Jim Nicholls
- Peter Jeffrey as Belle's uncle
- Hubert Tucker as café owner
- Nina Francis as petrol station attendant
- George Collis as 1st motorcycle youth
- Ralph Arliss as 2nd motorcycle youth
- Juliet Aykroyd as Stephen's girlfriend
- Roger Nott as motorcycle policeman
- Norman Tyrrell as hotel receptionist

== Filming locations ==
The film credits state that all filming was conducted in the West Country. Specifically, the locations have been identified as Bristol and Somerset.

== Release ==
The film opened at the Rialto cinema in London on 27 March 1975.

== Critical reception ==
The Monthly Film Bulletin wrote: "Red herrings (and there are shoals of them in Deadly Strangers) are a perfectly valid thriller device, as Hitchcock has frequently shown. But the withholding of essential plot information that is readily available to all the characters is bare-faced cheating, and in this respect, Sidney Hayers' inflated TV time-passer is guilty of something akin to criminal fraud. Why, for instance, is the audience not permitted to see the newspaper headline which gives the game away to everyone in the film? Why does the camera suddenly become subjective at moments of homicidal mania? The answers are obvious, but such deceptions prove to be a singularly vain and clumsy method of building tension. Not that it matters a great deal, since the film's outcome is so evident from the first five minutes that all subsequent scenes serve only to highlight and compound the improbability of the principal characters' behaviour. Hayley Mills and Simon Ward struggle valiantly to disguise the fact of their miscasting, but lost causes are clearly not their métier."

Time Out noted "old-fashioned psychopathic goings-on in the West Country" and its "sole redeeming feature is Hayley Mills, who suggests an actress capable of much better things than she has been offered recently. Hayers, to his credit, does exploit her best quality – an insolent, slightly offhand sex appeal."

TV Guide found it an "occasionally intriguing tale," concluding that it was "well done, but it seems to bog down in its own cleverness."

Filmink called the film "a psycho thriller with Simon Ward in which Mills went nude again but couldn't compensate for a lack of story."
