= The Come On =

1956 film

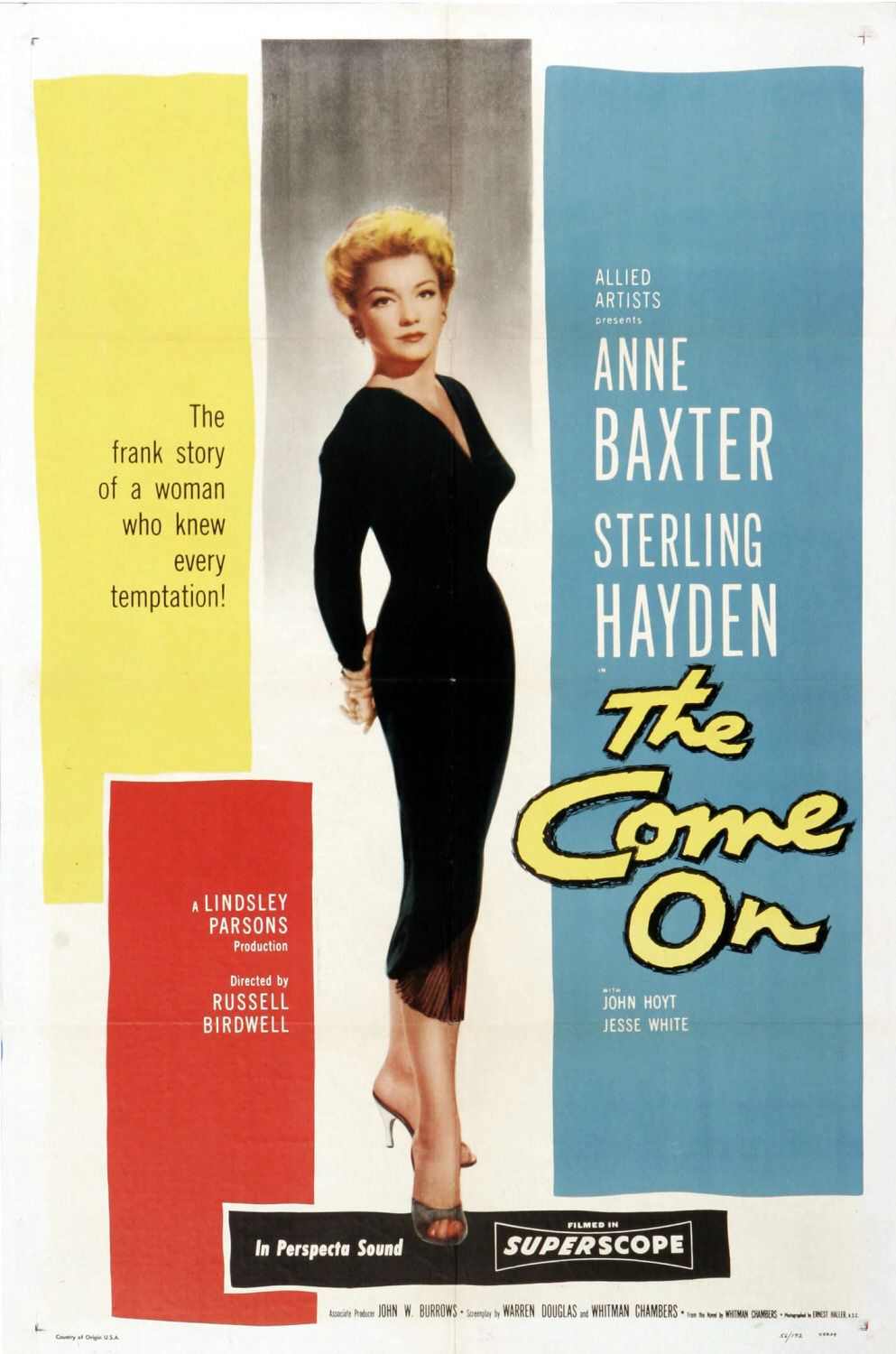
- Theatrical release poster
- Directed by: Russell Birdwell
- Written by: Whitman Chambers; Warren Douglas
- Story by: Whitman Chambers (novel)
- Produced by: Lindsley Parsons; John H. Burrows
- Starring: Anne Baxter; Sterling Hayden; John Hoyt
- Cinematography: Ernest Haller
- Edited by: Maurice Wright
- Music by: Paul Dunlap
- Production company: Lindsley Parsons Productions
- Distributed by: Allied Artists Pictures
- Release date: April 15, 1956 (United States)
- Running time: 83 minutes
- Country: United States
- Language: English

The Come On is a 1956 American film noir directed by Russell Birdwell and starring Anne Baxter, Sterling Hayden and John Hoyt. It was distributed by Allied Artists Pictures.

== Plot ==
While fishing on a Mexican beach Dave Arnold (Sterling Hayden) meets beautiful Rita Kendrick (Anne Baxter). Dave turns on the blonde resolutely and purposefully. It seems, the both are immediately drawn to each other. A first date is easily fixed, but very soon Rita ends it and leaves the perplexed Dave's fishing boat, after she asked him to kiss her. What Dave doesn't know so far: Rita is married. She and her significantly older husband are a criminal couple. He witnesses a staged marriage scene in the nearby restaurant: Harley Kendrick feigns drunkenness, behaves exceptionally rudely and slaps his wife. Dave intervenes and punches the drunk, who is then brought to the houseboat by an older man, a holiday acquaintance with whom Harley had befriended. This man is scheduled to walk in a trap. In fact, as planned, he offers Rita money and an alternative apartment for her divorce. Afterwards, the couple - Kendrick had overheard the conversation - wants to blackmail him for this offer, whose motivation seems clear to everybody. But now it turns out that Kendrick's actual jealousy was incited by Dave's action at the restaurant.

Rita, revealing the truth about her criminal connection to Kendrick, begs Arnold to murder her abusing husband but he refuses. Upon learning that he has been cuckolded, Harley Kendrick (John Hoyt) fakes his own death by exploding a boat in the hopes of framing Rita for the murder. The sleazy detective (Jesse White), formerly engaged by Kendrick, clears Rita's name officially, but then he begins blackmailing her with the affair she has been having. She stops that game by murdering him. Dave and Rita flee to La Paz, Mexico. Shortly after, she is shocked to discover that her husband is still alive. Finally, the love triangle meets upon the beach where Rita shoots her husband. As he dies he shoots her back. Rita dies in Dave's arms.

== Cast ==
- Anne Baxter as Rita Kendrick
- Sterling Hayden as Dave Arnold
- John Hoyt as Harley Kendrick
- Jesse White as J. J. McGonigle
- Wally Cassell as Tony Margoli
- Paul Picerni as Assistant D.A. Jannings
- Theodore Newton as Capt. Getz
- Tyler McVey as Detective Hogan

== See also ==
- List of American films of 1956
