= Take Me to Town =

1953 film

- Theatrical release poster
- Directed by: Douglas Sirk
- Screenplay by: Richard Morris
- Story by: Richard Morris
- Produced by: Ross Hunter
- Starring: Ann Sheridan; Sterling Hayden
- Cinematography: Russell Metty
- Edited by: Milton Carruth
- Music by: Joseph Gershenson
- Color process: Technicolor
- Production company: Universal International Pictures
- Distributed by: Universal Pictures
- Release dates: June 12, 1953 (Los Angeles); June 19, 1953 (New York City)
- Running time: 81 minutes
- Country: United States
- Language: English
- Box office: $1 million (US rentals)

Take Me to Town is a 1953 American comedy western film directed by Douglas Sirk and starring Ann Sheridan and Sterling Hayden.

== Plot ==
Pursued by a federal Marshal and needing a place to hide out, the musical comedy singer/dancer Mae Madison settles down to work in a new town under a new name, Vermilion O'Toole, pursued by her (apparent) partner in crime, Newt Cole.

The lady fugitive comes across three young boys who are looking for a new wife for their recently widowed dad, Will Hall, a lumberjack and local preacher. With the aid of her friend and boss Rose she flees from the Marshal, to look after the three boys while their father is working away. Complications - including ructions from Will's sanctimonious congregation - arise when the new 'housekeeper' and Will begin to hit it off.

The denouement unfolds during the performance of a stage show, put on by Vermilion to raise money to build a church for Will.

== Cast ==
- Ann Sheridan as Vermilion O'Toole
- Sterling Hayden as Will Hall
- Phillip Reed as Newton Cole
- Lee Patrick as Rose
- Lee Aaker as Corney
- Harvey Grant as Petey
- Dustey Henley as Bucket
- Larry Gates as Ed Daggett
- Forrest Lewis as Ed Higgins
- Phyllis Stanley as Mrs. Stoffer
- Dorothy Neumann as Felice Pickett
- Ann Tyrrell as Louise Pickett

Future Disney Television leading men, Fess Parker and Guy Williams, both appeared uncredited in small speaking roles.

== Production ==
The film was Ross Hunter's first as a producer. The onetime actor was working as a teacher when Ann Sheridan suggested he turn to producing. He worked without salary at the Motion Picture Center to learn producing, then managed to set up the film Take Me to Town at Universal. Sheridan's normal price was $475,000 per film but she agreed to $100,000 to work with Hunter. "It was Annie who really gave me my first break," later recalled Hunter. "She was a very great lady."

In 1960, Hunter was reportedly working on a Broadway version Vermillion. It was never made.
