= Arrow in the Dust =

1954 film

Arrow In the Dust
- Directed by: Lesley Selander
- Screenplay by: Don Martin
- Based on: Arrow in the Dust; 1954 novel by L.L. Foreman
- Produced by: Hayes Goetz; Marvin Mirisch
- Starring: Sterling Hayden; Coleen Gray; Keith Larsen
- Cinematography: Ellis W. Carter
- Edited by: William Austin
- Music by: Marlin Skiles
- Production company: Allied Artists Pictures
- Distributed by: Allied Artists Pictures
- Release date: April 25, 1954
- Running time: 79 minutes
- Country: United States
- Language: English

Arrow In the Dust is a 1954 American western film directed by Lesley Selander and starring Sterling Hayden, Coleen Gray and Keith Larsen. Shot in Technicolor, it was produced and distributed by Allied Artists. The film is based on the 1954 novel Arrow in the Dust by L.L. Foreman.

== Plot ==
Cavalry deserter Bart Laish comes upon an ambushed wagon and a mortally wounded major. The officer's dying request is for Laish to catch up to the remainder of the wagon train and help guide it safely to a fort.

Laish assumes the major's identity, eventually joining up with a wagon train that has been repeatedly attacked by Indians. He is resented at first by Christella Burke, who owns one of the wagons, and Lt. Steve King, who until now has been leading the wagon train. Laish also shoots a crew boss who challenges him.

Unable to understand why the Indians keep staging raids against these same wagons, Laish and scout Crowshaw distract them with cases of liquor. They also anger Tillotson, a trader, by using his large wagon as bait. Christella is impressed by Laish's bravery, then accidentally learns of his true identity. Crowshaw ends up shooting Tillotson, whose wagons are filled with guns and ammunition, including Henry repeating rifles, that the Indians have been after all along. Christella falls in love with Laish, who decides to turn himself in, with Lt. King offering to vouch for his character.

== Cast ==
- Sterling Hayden as Laish
- Coleen Gray as Christella
- Carleton Young as Maj. Andy Pepperis
- Keith Larsen as Lt. Steve King
- John Pickard as Sgt. Lybarger
- Jack Ingram as Cpl. Demington
- Jimmy Wakely as Pvt. Carqueville the singing soldier
- Tom Tully as Crowshaw
- Tudor Owen as Tillotson
- Lee Van Cleef as Crew Boss
- Iron Eyes Cody as Chief Rasacura
- John Maxwell as George Owsley

== Bibliography ==
- Pitts, Michael R. Western Movies: A Guide to 5,105 Feature Films. McFarland, 2012.
