= Valerie (film) =

1957 film by Gerd Oswald nice

- Theatrical release poster
- Directed by: Gerd Oswald
- Screenplay by: Leonard Heideman; Emmett Murphy
- Produced by: Hal R. Makelim
- Starring: Sterling Hayden; Anita Ekberg; Anthony Steel
- Cinematography: Ernest Laszlo
- Edited by: David Bretherton
- Music by: Albert Glasser
- Color process: Black and white
- Production company: Hal R. Makelim Productions
- Distributed by: United Artists
- Release date: August 1, 1957
- Running time: 82 minutes
- Country: United States
- Language: English

Valerie is a 1957 American Western film directed by Gerd Oswald and starring Sterling Hayden, Anita Ekberg and Anthony Steel. The film was apparently inspired by Akira Kurosawa's 1950 classic Rashomon.

== Plot ==
Rancher John Garth is arrested for critically wounding his wife Valerie and killing her parents. During Garth's trial, contradictory flashback sequences are depicted.

== Cast ==
- Sterling Hayden as John Garth
- Anita Ekberg as Valerie Horvat
- Anthony Steel as Reverend Steven Blake
- Peter Walker as Herb Garth
- Jerry Barclay as Jim Mingo
- Iphigenie Castiglioni as Mrs. Horvat
- John Wengraf as Mr. Louis Horvat
- Gage Clarke as Jonathan Griggs
- Tom McKee as Dave Carlin
- Sydney Smith as Judge Frisbee
- Bob Adler as Lundy
- Stanley Adams as Dr. Jackson
- Malcolm Atterbury as Sheriff
- Juney Ellis as Nurse Linsey
- John Dierkes as Bartender
- Norman Leavitt as Linsey
- Darryl Duran as Earl Davis

== Production ==
Filming for Valerie started in December 1956. It was the only film that Anthony Steel and Anita Ekberg made together during their marriage.

== Reception ==
Variety called the film "a challenging experiment."

In a contemporary review in Baltimore's The Evening Sun, reviewer Hope Pantell wrote: "This opus opens with an assortment of bodies, then proceeds to show, sometimes in painfully long-winded fashion, how they got to be so stiff."

Writing in The Philadelphia Inquirer, reviewer Samuel L. Singer assessed the lead actors' performances: "Lovely Anita Ekberg, Swedish beauty, displays her charms and engages in a limited amount of histrionics. Sterling Hayden is grimly nonsmiling as her husband, and Anthony Steel, her real-life husband, is convincing as the minister."

== Home media ==
Valerie was released on DVD by MGM Home Video on September 26, 2011 via MGM's MOD (manufacture-on-demand) program through Amazon.com.

== See also ==
- List of American films of 1957
