= Shotgun (1955 film) =

1955 film by Lesley Selander

- Theatrical release poster
- Directed by: Lesley Selander
- Written by: Clark Reynolds; Rory Calhoun
- Produced by: John C. Champion
- Starring: Sterling Hayden; Yvonne De Carlo; Zachary Scott
- Cinematography: Ellsworth Fredericks
- Edited by: Dave Milton
- Music by: Carl Brandt
- Color process: Technicolor
- Production company: Allied Artists Pictures
- Distributed by: Allied Artists Pictures
- Release date: April 24, 1955
- Running time: 80 minutes
- Country: United States
- Language: English

Shotgun is a 1955 American Western film directed by Lesley Selander and starring Sterling Hayden, Yvonne De Carlo and Zachary Scott.

== Plot ==
A gang led by Ben Thompson is running guns to the Apaches. Three of them ride into town to ambush two marshals but only succeed in killing one. When the gang later discuss what to do next, Bentley says he prefers to head for California and Thompson tells him to go ahead.

Back in town, the other marshal, Clay Hardin, turns his back on his fiancée and a government job so as to go after the gang. Along the trail he comes across Bentley, who had been captured and left to die by Apaches. Also left is Abby, a former saloon worker who is looking for a fresh start in California. Although Hardin frees them, Bentley later tries to shoot Hardin, but is killed by him.

While Hardin and Abby are resting in high ground that evening, a band of Apaches speed by in pursuit of a rider. When Clay shoots two Apaches with his rifle, the others flee. The rider is Carleton, a bounty hunter known to Hardin, but not approved of by him. Carleton is intrigued by Clay's shotgun which, he tells Abby, since it has an effective range of only about 30 yards, is a poor weapon for the kind of shooting Hardin usually does.

Up ahead on the trail, Thompson and the two remaining men in his gang are contacted by an Apache messenger. He tells them that Bentley had not died in the manner they intended. Thompson concludes that Hardin is pursuing him and that Bentley will have informed him of their plans. The gang therefore prepare another ambush at the next stage post, tying up those manning it, while Thompson rides on. In the confrontation that follows, Hardin shoots one of the ambushers, and Carleton, approaching from behind, shoots the other. The stage post men tell Hardin that Thompson has moved on to meet up with the Apache chief, Delgadito.

Hardin and Abby argue over their future; she tries to persuade him not to continue chasing Thompson, and instead to go with her to California. When he protests that he is chasing Thompson to see that justice is done and so that law and order would be served, she counters that he is doing it because he loves conflict and the thrill of the chase. However, Hardin still decides to continue his pursuit of Thompson.

Meanwhile, Thompson has ridden into the Apache camp, but without the rifles he has promised to sell them he is not particularly welcome. The chief tells him he is considering returning with his warriors to the reservation.

Abby and Carleton chase after Hardin, because Carleton wants the reward for capturing Thompson. He intends to give Hardin a head start and then continue following him, but a cooking fire he starts alerts the Apaches. Clay hears the shots of their attack and races back, only to discover that Carleton is dying and Abby has been captured. She is rescued from rape when Hardin rides into the Apache camp brandishing his shotgun.

Delgadito decides that Hardin and Thompson should have a shotgun duel on horseback to settle their differences, with each fighter allowed a single cartridge. Thompson fires first so as to injure Hardin's horse and, having failed in clubbing him after Hardin falls, tries to escape. Delgadito then kills Thompson with a cast of his spear.

Abby and Hardin embrace and she tells him that, instead of heading for California, she would rather join him on the ranch, where he had previously told her that he intends to live.

== Cast ==
- Sterling Hayden as Clay Hardin
- Yvonne De Carlo as Abby
- Zachary Scott as Reb Carleton
- Guy Prescott as Ben Thompson
- Robert J. Wilke as Bentley
- Angela Greene as Aletha
- Paul Marion as Delgadito
- John Pickard as Perez
- Ralph Sanford as Chris
- Rory Mallinson as Frank
- Fiona Hale as Midge
- Ward Wood as Ed
- Lane Chandler as Mark Fletcher
- Al Wyatt Sr. as Greybar
- Harry Harvey Jr. as Davey

== Production ==
It was based on a story written by actor Rory Calhoun. Producer John Champion tried to get Calhoun in the movie but Universal Pictures would not lend him out. Filming took place in Sedona, Arizona. Yvonne De Carlo wrote in her memoirs that the film was "hardly worth mentioning" except that she once had a crush on her co-star Sterling Hayden and that this was the film where she met stunt man Bob Morgan, who became her husband.

== Reception ==
The Los Angeles Times called it "a rip roaring bang-bangie with a bit more originality and freshness than is usual."
