= Hard Contract =

1969 film

- Theatrical release poster
- Directed by: S. Lee Pogostin
- Written by: S. Lee Pogostin
- Produced by: Marvin Schwartz
- Starring: James Coburn; Lee Remick
- Cinematography: Jack Hildyard
- Edited by: Harry W. Gerstad
- Music by: Alex North
- Production company: 20th Century Fox
- Distributed by: 20th Century Fox
- Release date: April 30, 1969
- Running time: 106 minutes
- Country: United States
- Language: English
- Budget: $4,070,000
- Box office: $1,750,000 (US/ Canada rentals)

Hard Contract is a 1969 American drama mystery film written and directed by S. Lee Pogostin and starring James Coburn and Lee Remick. It premiered on April 30, 1969, in Panavision.

== Plot ==
CIA assassin John Cunningham, a cold-blooded killer with nerves of steel and no conscience, kills a man on election day, votes in the local election and spends the rest of the afternoon with Ellen, a prostitute. The next day, Cunningham goes to see James Ramsey, his mobilizer, a CIA man whose cover is a job as a college physics professor.

Ramsey offers one final, lucrative job, or "hard contract" as he calls it, that can allow Cunningham to retire from the business for good. This consists of three hits, two in Spain and Belgium, with the last victim to be revealed after the first two are dispatched.

On his way to Spain to make the first hit, Cunningham meets two women in Tangier who will change his life: American tourist and jet setter Sheila Metcalfe, and her naive but good-hearted friend, socialite Adrianne.

He does kill the first two victims, but later, as remorse slowly takes hold over him, Cunningham can't bring himself to knock off his third target, former top CIA hit-man Michael Carson. A more vicious and effective hit-man in his day than Cunningham is now, Carson has become so passive, he wouldn't even defend himself.

Ramsey flies to Spain to persuade Cunningham to complete the job, and promises Cunningham that if he does not do so, he will himself be killed, and so will Sheila. Cunningham drives Ramsey, Sheila, Carson, and everyone else who knows about him back down a mountain, and is close to deliberately causing a car crash that would free him for all time, only to relent at the last moment, telling a confused Ramsey afterwards that murder is obsolete. Ramsey is then romanced by Adrianne, much to his bemusement, and it's unclear if he has also weakened in his resolve.

The ending is enigmatic, with Cunningham and Sheila running off together and beginning to make love, as Cunningham tells her that the worst deeds can be done for the best motives. The final image of them narrows to a circle around their heads, reminiscent of the image one would see in a rifle scope.

== Cast ==
- James Coburn as John Cunningham
- Lee Remick as Sheila Metcalfe
- Lilli Palmer as Adrianne
- Burgess Meredith as Ramsey Williams
- Patrick Magee as Alexi
- Sterling Hayden as Michael Carlson
- Claude Dauphin as Maurice
- Helen Cherry as Evelyn Carlson
- Karen Black as Ellen
- Sabine Sun as Belgian Prostitute
- Jo Nupie as Flemish lady
- Miquel Bordoy
- Gerda Marchand
- Vic Moeremans

== Production ==
Pogostin was an award-winning TV writer and director, who had written some features including Pressure Point. Producer Marvin Swartz approached him to see if he was interested in adaptating a story for the screen. Pogostin instead pitched an original story of his, Hard Contract, and Schwarz was enthusiastic. Pogostin insisted on directing. Schwartz financed the writing of the script over 15 months.

Filming began in May 1968. The film was shot in Spain, Belgium and Tangier. "It's an allegory," said Coburn. "It's a very violent film, but the violence is of the mind."

== Reception ==
=== Critical ===
Variety said it was a "skillfully-mounted film" and "most audiences should buy it to the profit of 20th and the exhibs."

Harlan Ellison declared the film was "that incredible rarity, a film of entertainment that comes to grips with second and third-level philosophical concepts. A film of meaning."

Sight and Sound called it a "slightly pretentious oddity of a metaphysical thriller" with "limping direction, but a script which lakes its attractive cast out on some rather intriguing limbs." A later review in the same magazine from Tim Lucas said, "Lurking behind its John Woo-like title is a movie that lures people in with the promise of an action thriller but then presents them with a heady talk-fest about love, morality and commitment. It may be the artiest picture produced by a major US studio up to that time." Filmink said the film "sounds like a try-hard commercial project (assassin falls in love) but it’s actually super arty, with lots of chat... Coburn isn’t ideal in a role better suited for Lee Marvin, but the movie gets points for being different."

Sam Peckinpah, who at one stage was going to form a company with Pogostin, said of Hard Contract, "I read the script and I saw the film. I think he’s a very talented writer. But he doesn’t understand making films."

=== Box office ===
According to Fox records the film required $7,200,000 in rentals to break even and by December 11, 1970, it had made $3,200,000, making it a loss for the studio.

== Subsequent release ==
Hard Contract was first broadcast on television by ABC in 1974. It was released on VHS by 20th Century Fox in 1982 in the UK and by Fox Video in 1996 in the United States.

Ster-Kinekor Video and CBS/Fox Video released the film with 20th Century Fox, which was released on VHS in 1990 in South Africa.

== See also ==
- List of American films of 1969
