= Battle Taxi =

1955 film

- Theatrical release poster
- Directed by: Herbert L. Strock
- Screenplay by: Malvin Wald
- Story by: Art Arthur; Malvin Wald
- Produced by: Art Arthur; Ivan Tors
- Starring: Sterling Hayden; Arthur Franz; Marshall Thompson; Leo Needham; Jay Barney
- Cinematography: Lothrop B. Worth
- Edited by: Jodie Copelan
- Music by: Harry Sukman
- Production company: Ivan Tors Productions
- Distributed by: United Artists
- Release date: January 26, 1955
- Running time: 82 minutes
- Country: United States
- Language: English

Battle Taxi is a 1955 American aviation drama film directed by Herbert L. Strock and written by Malvin Wald. The film stars Sterling Hayden, Arthur Franz, Marshall Thompson, Leo Needham and Jay Barney. The film was released on January 26, 1955 by United Artists.

== Plot ==
In the Korean War, Capt. Russ Edwards, the commander of an Air Rescue helicopter team, must show Lt. Pete Stacy, a hot-shot former jet pilot how important helicopter rescue work is and turn him into a team player.

Lt. Col. Stoneham, the overall commander of the unit, is worried that the rescue missions are being jeopardized by the number of helicopters out of service, and leans on Edwards to make his men aware that taking unnecessary risks is hurting their operational readiness. Despite the cautions, on the very next mission, Stacy and his copilot, 2nd Lt. Tim Vernon and Medic put themselves and a rescued soldier in danger. When the soldier tells them that his patrol is trapped by an enemy tank, Stacy does not wait for the jets on station to come in, but attacks the tank with only his flares, resulting in his helicopter being shot up and put out of commission.

Edwards tries to reinforce the message that the helicopter rescue is important and stations Stacy and his crew at the farthest base, near the enemy lines. Although Stacy accomplishes a risky rescue of a downed airman, his effort to bring back an airman unconscious in the sea, risks not only his life but all the men aboard his helicopter when he runs out of fuel. Stacy successfully pulls it off by refuelling from a damaged North Korean fuel truck but the fuel contaminates the engine and puts his helicopter out of commission.

The repaired helicopter is tested by Stacy and his crew but their test flight is interrupted by an emergency call where Stacy has to face not only the enemy but also rely on a helicopter rescue after he is seriously wounded and his helicopter is downed with the loss of the jet pilot that was just picked up. Edwards arrives to rescue everyone but calls in a jet fighter patrol to mop up an enemy force. When Stacy recovers, he is now convinced that his job is an essential one and that being part of a team is important.

== Cast ==
- Sterling Hayden as Capt. Russ Edwards
- Arthur Franz as Lt. Pete Stacy
- Marshall Thompson as 2nd Lt. Tim Vernon
- Leo Needham as Sgt. "Slats" Klein
- Jay Barney as Lt. Col. Philip Stoneham
- John Dennis as MSgt. Joe Murdock
- Michael Colgan as Medic Capt. Larsen
- Andy Andrews as Lazy Joker Two
- Dale Hutchinson as Blue Boy Three-Gene
- Robert Sherman as Lt. Joe Kirk
- Joel Marston as Lt. Marty Staple
- Vance Skarsted as Lt. Smiley Jackson
- Capt. Vincent H. McGovern as Harry, co-pilot

== Production ==
Capt. Vincent H. McGovern who also appeared as Harry, one of the co-pilots, served as the technical advisor to the film. His background and experience with helicopter operations in Korea became essential to the production. The extensive use of combat footage of North American F-86 Sabre jet fighters, Sikorsky H-19 Chickasaw helicopters, SA-16A Albatross amphibians, and the Boeing SB-29 "Super Dumbo" Dumbo (air-sea rescue) aircraft made the film more authentic and realistic. The Department of Defense, The United States Air Force and The 42 Air Rescue Squadron made the film possible with their contributions.

== Reception ==
Despite the efforts of Ivan Tors to create a gripping war drama in Battle Taxi, the hackneyed plot made the film nothing more than a programmer. Film historian Stephen Pendo called it "... a poor account."

== See also ==
- List of American films of 1955
