= Crime Wave (1954 film) =

1954 film by André de Toth

- Theatrical release poster
- Directed by: Andre de Toth
- Written by: Bernard Gordon; Richard Wormser
- Screenplay by: Crane Wilbur
- Based on: "Criminal's Mark"; The Saturday Evening Post 1950 by John Hawkins and Ward Hawkins
- Produced by: Bryan Foy
- Starring: Sterling Hayden; Gene Nelson; Phyllis Kirk
- Cinematography: Bert Glennon
- Edited by: Thomas Reilly
- Music by: David Buttolph
- Color process: Black and white
- Production company: Warner Bros. Pictures
- Distributed by: Warner Bros. Pictures
- Release date: January 12, 1954 (United States)
- Running time: 74 minutes
- Country: United States
- Language: English

Crime Wave (also known as The City Is Dark) is a 1954 American film noir starring Sterling Hayden and Gene Nelson, and directed by Andre de Toth. It was adapted from a short story which originally appeared in The Saturday Evening Post – "Criminal's Mark" by John and Ward Hawkins.

== Plot ==
'Doc' Penny and two of his gang have broken out of San Quentin. While robbing a gas station for "eatin' money," they kill a police officer. However, one of the gang members is badly wounded. A city-wide search ensues, led by hard-nosed detective Sims. He orders records searched to determine if there is an ex-con in the vicinity who might give them shelter. Meanwhile, at Steve Lacey's apartment, his phone rings in the middle of the night. Lacey, two years out of San Quentin, has gone straight. He's married now, with a good job as an aircraft mechanic. He answers the phone, someone asks for him, then hangs up. He regularly receives unwanted phone calls from ex-cons who pass through town, looking for a handout, so he and his wife Ellen assume this is just another. Back at headquarters, Lacey's name turns up in Lieutenant Sims' search. Despite Lacey leading a clean life since leaving prison, Sims feels he's a likely candidate for the escapees to seek out. He has an underling call him. When the phone rings again, Steve and Ellen are sure it's just another ex-prisoner, so they ignore the call. But this only confirms Sims' suspicions, and he sets out to check on him personally.

Before Sims arrives, however, Gat Morgan, the man wounded in the gas-station hold-up, knocks at Lacey's door. The escapee has already summoned a disreputable, alcoholic doctor-turned-veterinarian, Otto Hessler, from prison. Lacey demands Morgan leave, but he is "hurt bad" and cannot move. Shortly after, Gat dies. The doctor arrives, confirms Gat's death, grabs his $100 fee from the dead man's jacket, and leaves. Lacey now realizes the other two escapees, Penny and Hastings, will likely arrive soon. He hesitates calling police, believing they won't believe he's not involved. Yet Ellen urges him to phone his parole officer. As Lacey makes the call, Sims arrives. He relentlessly grills Lacey, espousing his "once a crook, always a crook" dogma. He then takes him to jail, where he threatens him with fresh charges if he doesn't help catch Penny and Hastings. Knowing the repercussions of "finking," Lacey refuses to cooperate. He is held three days and finally released. When Steve returns home, Penny and Hastings turn up and impose themselves. Fearing for Ellen's safety, Lacey resigns himself to hiding the two men for "a couple of days."

Meanwhile, Sims visits Dr. Hessler and persuades him to discover if Lacey has heard from his old prison mates. As Hessler arrives outside Lacey's apartment, he overhears men's voices, but he does not see anyone other than Lacey. After Hessler nervously exits, Doc Penny has Hastings tail Hessler to his veterinary hospital. Before Hessler can phone Sims to report, Hastings murders him. His shot, however, alerts a passer-by, who summons the police. Back at Lacey's, Penny lays out a plan to rob a bank. Lacey refuses to take part, but Hastings returns, explaining he had to abandon Lacey's car near the hospital to evade the police. With the car certain to implicate Lacey in Hessler's murder, Penny asserts Lacey now must cooperate. So Lacey and Ellen depart with Penny's gang. As predicted, Lacey's car is soon found, and Sims issues an APB for Lacey on a charge of murder.

Penny's group rendezvous with two other thugs at a hideout. Lacey is selected getaway driver and to ensure his compliance, Ellen is held hostage by one of the thugs. However, when the gang attempts to rob the bank, things go badly wrong. Penny is shot dead; the others are killed or captured. Lacey takes off for the hideout, with Sims in pursuit. Once there, Lacey springs into a fistfight with a gang member manhandling Ellen. Sims catches up at its knock-down, drag-out climax. Sims then takes Lacey and Ellen for the drive downtown to police headquarters. Steve is convinced he will return to prison. However, Sims reveals that police found a note Lacey had left in his medicine cabinet, alerting them of the robbery. This gave them time to staff the bank with police officers. The detective then tersely lectures Steve on his failure to inform the police about Penny and Hastings earlier, pointing out that the note could easily have been overlooked. He barks, "Next time, Lacey, call me...you got trouble, you need help, call me!" To the couple's shock and relief, Sims drops them off outside City Hall, ordering them to take a bus home before he changes his mind.

== Cast ==
- Sterling Hayden as Detective Lieutenant Sims
- Gene Nelson as Steve Lacey
- Phyllis Kirk as Ellen Lacey
- Ted de Corsia as 'Doc' Penny
- Charles Bronson as Ben Hastings (credited as Charles Buchinsky)
- Jay Novello as Otto Hessler
- Ned Young as Gat Morgan
- James Bell as Daniel O'Keefe, Steve's Parole Officer
- Dub Taylor as Gus Snider
- Timothy Carey as Johnny Haslett (uncredited)
- Gayle Kellogg as Detective
- Mack Chandler as Sully

== Production ==
Location shooting at downtown Los Angeles' Wall Street in Crime Wave

Much of the film was shot on location in Los Angeles and in nearby Burbank and Glendale. At least one 1952 location, Sawyer's Pet Hospital at the corner of San Fernando Road and Alma Street in Glendale, is still standing and, as of April 2024, still a pet hospital, albeit with a different name. Several locations seen onscreen, like the Bank of America on the southwest corner of Brand Boulevard and Broadway in Glendale (where the film's big robbery attempt takes place), as well as the distinctive dental building across Brand Boulevard, have been torn down and replaced.

The final chase scene from the bank in Glendale to Chinatown in downtown Los Angeles, though edited, follows the actual route, including Brand Boulevard and the Glendale Boulevard fork on the Hyperion Viaduct, until Steve Lacey reaches the house (possibly on Maple Street, just east of Los Angeles Street in the Chinatown district) where the crazed Johnny Haslett is holding Lacey's wife. The gas station in the film's opening scene, on Wall Street just south of East 3rd Street, near Boyd Street, has since been demolished. Other specific downtown Los Angeles locations include Los Angeles Union Station and the Los Angeles City Hall (including interiors of the Homicide Bureau). The final scene, where Lt. Sims sends Steve and Ellen home, was shot on the 200 block of North Main Street, with Sterling Hayden leaning against the side of the City Hall Building.

== Release ==
Crime Wave was first released in Italy and Britain in 1953. It premiered in the U.S. on January 12, 1954, in New York City.
