= Sterling Hayden =

American actor (1916–1986)

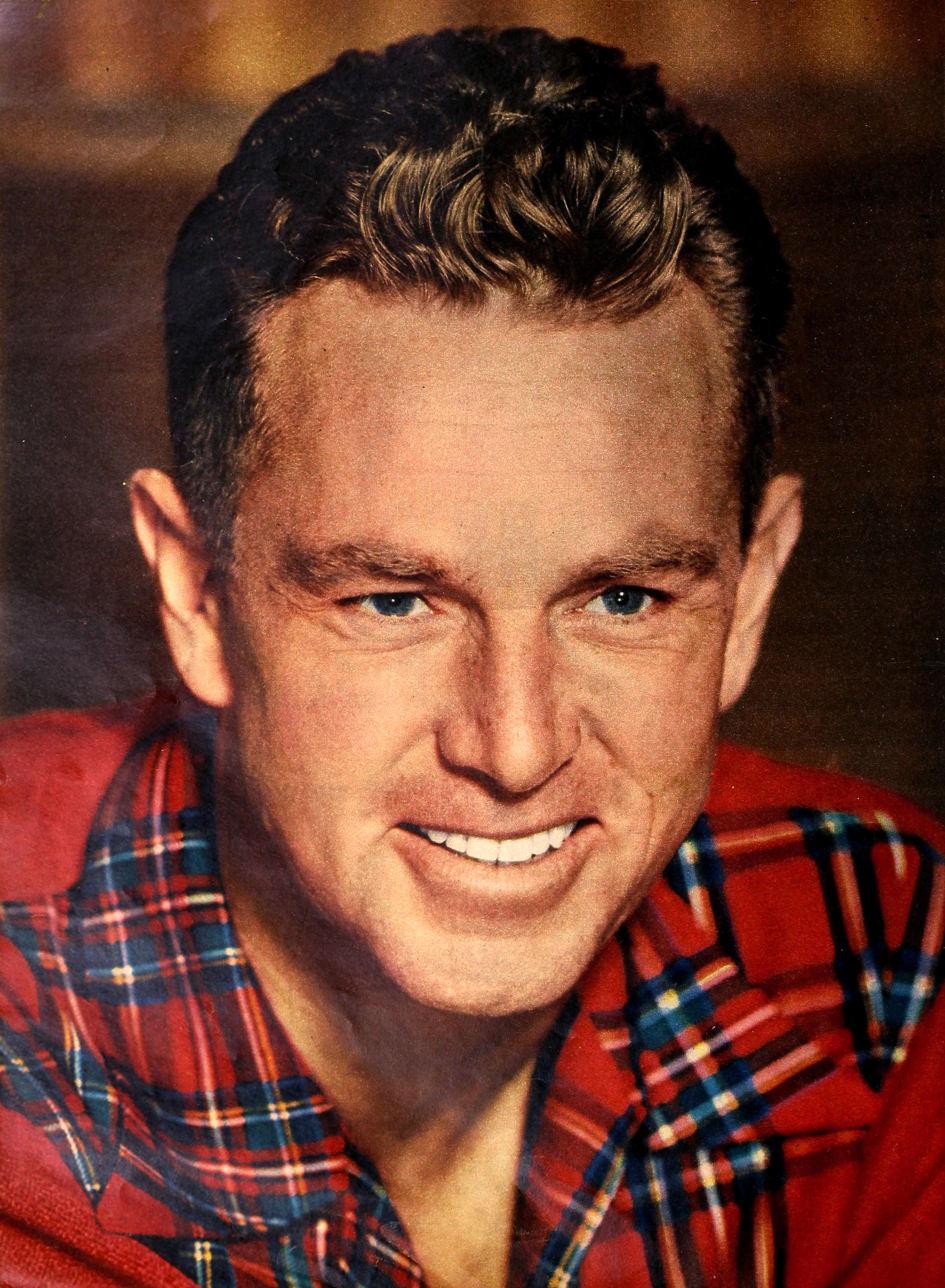
- Hayden in 1953
- Born: Sterling Relyea Walter; March 26, 1916; Upper Montclair, New Jersey, U.S.
- Died: May 23, 1986 (aged 70); Sausalito, California, U.S.
- Other names: Sterling Walter Hayden; John Hamilton
- Occupations: Actor; author; sailor; Marine; OSS agent
- Years active: 1941–1982
- Height: 6 ft 5 in (196 cm)
- Spouses: Madeleine Carroll (m. 1942; div. 1946); Betty Ann de Noon (m. 1947; div. 1958); Catherine Devine McConnell (m. 1960)
- Children: 6
- Relatives: Scott McConnell (stepson)
- Military career
- Allegiance: United States
- Branch: United States Marine Corps
- Service years: 1941–1945
- Rank: Captain
- Unit: Office of Strategic Services
- Conflicts: World War II
- Awards: List

Sterling Walter Hayden (born Sterling Relyea Walter; March 26, 1916 – May 23, 1986) was an American actor. A leading man for most of his career, he specialized in Westerns and film noir throughout the 1950s, in films such as John Huston's The Asphalt Jungle (1950), Nicholas Ray's Johnny Guitar (1954), and Stanley Kubrick's The Killing (1956). In the 1960s, he became noted for supporting roles, perhaps most memorably as General Jack D. Ripper in Kubrick's Dr. Strangelove or: How I Learned to Stop Worrying and Love the Bomb (1964).

Hayden's success continued into the New Hollywood era, with roles such as Irish-American policeman Captain McCluskey in Francis Ford Coppola's The Godfather (1972), alcoholic novelist Roger Wade in Robert Altman's The Long Goodbye (1973), elderly peasant Leo Dalcò in Bernardo Bertolucci's 1900 (1976), and chairman of the board Russell Tinsworthy in 9 to 5 (1980). With a distinctive "rapid-fire baritone" voice and an imposing stature at 6 ft 5 in (196 cm), he had a commanding screen presence in both leading and supporting roles.

Hayden often professed a distaste for acting and used his earnings to finance his numerous voyages as a sailor. He was also a decorated Marine Corps officer and an Office of Strategic Services agent during World War II.

== Biography ==
=== Youth and sailing ===
Hayden was born March 26, 1916, in Upper Montclair, New Jersey, to George Woodruff Walter (1881–1925) and Minnie Frances Walter (née Simonson; 1889–1968), who named him Sterling Relyea Walter. After his father died, Sterling was adopted at age nine by James Hayden and renamed Sterling Walter Hayden. As a child, he lived in coastal towns of New England.

Hayden dropped out of high school at the age of 16 and took a job as mate on a schooner. His first voyage was to Newport Beach, California, from New London, Connecticut. Later, he was a fisherman on the Grand Banks of Newfoundland, ran a charter yacht, and served as a fireman on 11 trips to Cuba aboard a steamer.

He skippered a trading schooner in the Caribbean after earning his master's license, and in 1937 he served as mate on a world cruise of the brigantine Yankee. After working as a sailor and fireman on larger vessels and sailing around the world several times, he was awarded his first command at age 22, skippering the square rigger Florence C. Robinson 7,700 miles from Gloucester, Massachusetts, to Tahiti in 1938. Hayden spoke of his nautical experiences before the monthly meeting of the Adventurers' Club of New York on March 21, 1940.

=== Early Hollywood years ===
In 1938, Hayden's photo was taken during the annual Gloucester, Massachusetts, Fishermen's Race. It went on the cover of a magazine, prompting Paramount Pictures to call and offer a screen test. Hayden did a test in New York with Jeanne Cagney, James Cagney's sister. Hayden later said:

I was completely lost, ignorant, nervous. But the next thing I knew, Paramount made me a seven-year contract beginning at $250 a week, which was astronomical. I got my lovely old mother and bought a car, and we drove to California... I was so lost then I didn't think to analyze it. I said, 'This is nuts, but, damned, it's pleasant.' I had only one plan in mind: to get $5,000. I knew where there was a schooner, and then I'd haul ass.

Hayden went to Paramount in May 1940. The studio dubbed the 6 ft 5 in (196 cm) actor "The Most Beautiful Man in the Movies" and "The Beautiful Blond Viking God".

His first film, Virginia (1941), directed by Edward H. Griffith, starred Madeleine Carroll whom he married. He, Griffith and Carroll were reunited in Bahama Passage (1941). By December 1941, it was reported that Hayden had quit the movie business and declared, "I'm no actor! I'm a sailor."

=== War service ===
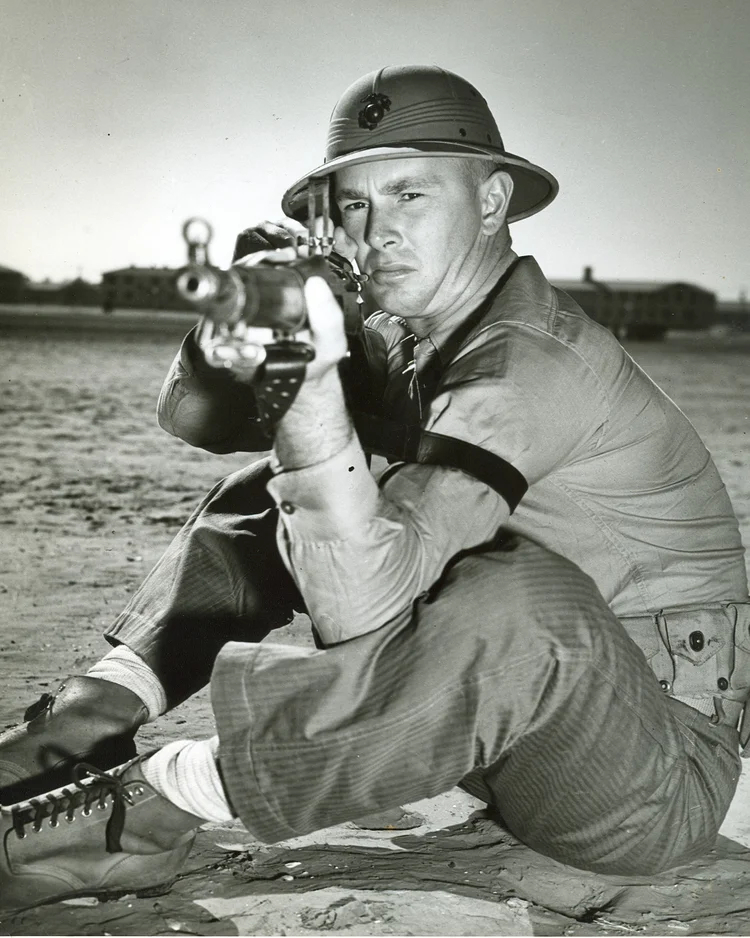
Hayden in his Marine Corps uniform at Parris Island c. January 1943

After the outbreak of World War II, Hayden enlisted in the Army and was sent to Scotland for training, but broke his ankle and was discharged.

Once he recovered from his injury, he enlisted in the Marine Corps. He was reportedly worried that his fellow Marines would not take him seriously because of his Hollywood fame, and so he adopted the pseudonym "John Hamilton", which he would carry throughout his war service. In June 1943, he had his name legally changed to John Hamilton.

After selection to and graduation from Marine Corps Officer Candidate School (OCS), Hamilton was commissioned a second lieutenant in the Marine Corps Reserve and was transferred for duty as an undercover agent with William J. "Wild Bill" Donovan's Office of the Coordinator of Information. Hamilton remained there after it became the Office of Strategic Services (OSS).

He received the Silver Star for gallantry in action in the Balkans and Mediterranean (according to his citation, "Lt. Hamilton displayed great courage in making hazardous sea voyages in enemy-infested waters and reconnaissance through enemy-held areas"), a Bronze Arrowhead device for parachuting behind enemy lines, and a commendation from Yugoslavia's Josip Broz Tito. He left active duty on December 24, 1945. Tito awarded him the Order of Merit.

=== Return to Hollywood ===
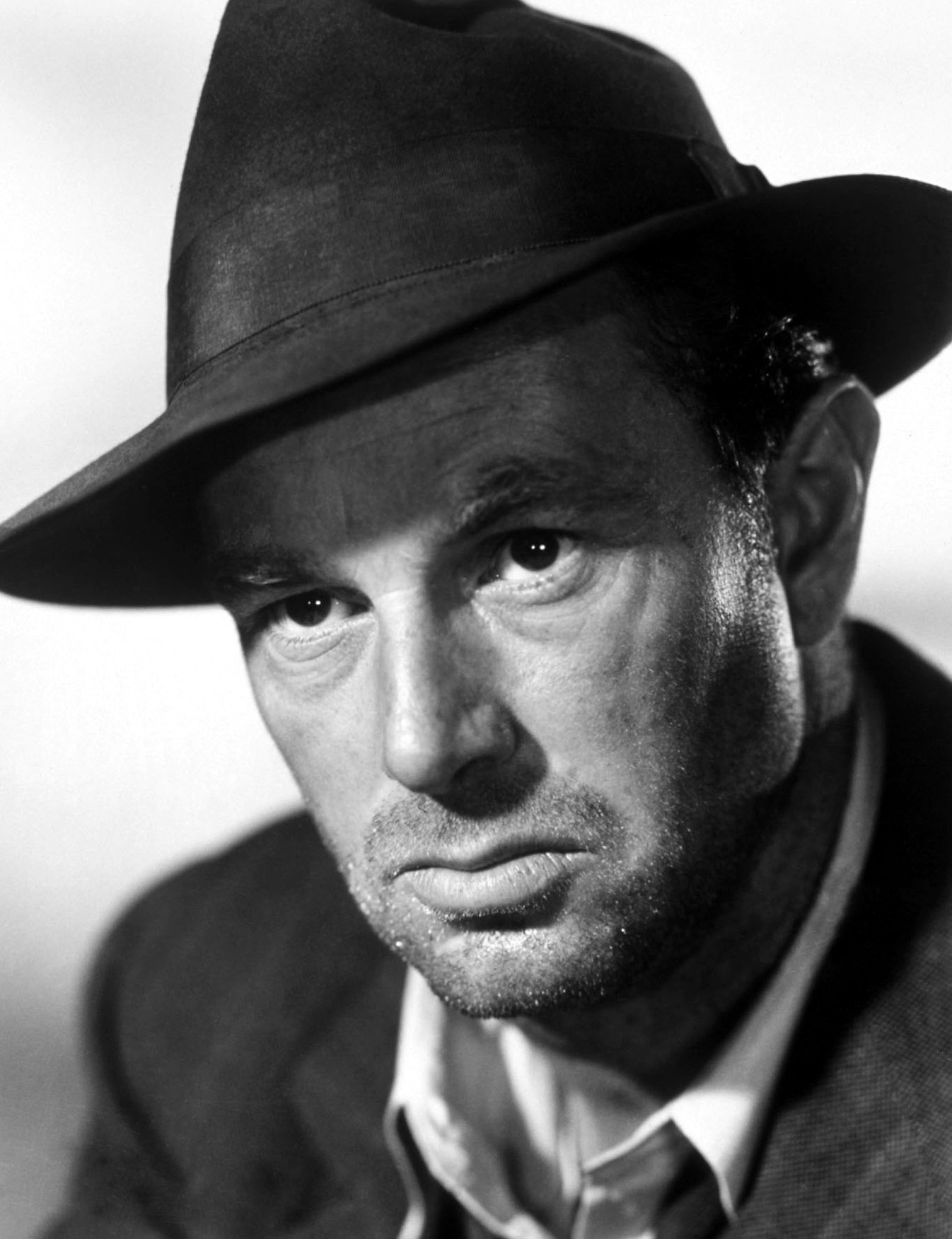
Publicity photo of Hayden from The Asphalt Jungle, 1950

He returned to the United States and told the press, "I feel a real obligation to make this a better country – and I believe the movies are the place to do it." He signed a contract with Paramount and was cast as one of several brothers in an aviation film, Blaze of Noon (1947). The studio suspended him when he turned down a role in The Sainted Sisters.

Hayden made two films for Pine Thomas Productions which distributed through Paramount: one was a Western, El Paso (1949), featuring John Payne; the other was Manhandled (1949), a thriller with Dorothy Lamour. In 1950, Hayden appeared in one of his most celebrated roles as the "hooligan" (tough guy) Dix Handley in the Academy Award-nominated film The Asphalt Jungle.

=== Communist Party and HUAC ===
Hayden's admiration for the Communist partisans he had fought alongside during World War II led him into a brief membership in the Communist Party (CPUSA) from June to December 1946. In one of his CPUSA assignments, he supported an effort by the Communist-controlled motion picture painters union to absorb other film industry unions.

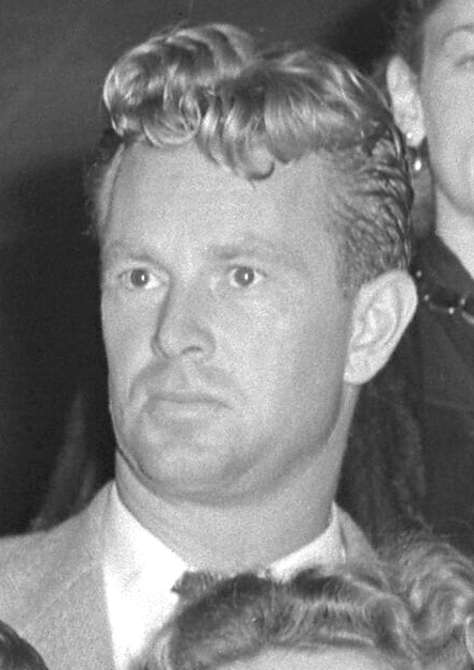
Hayden as a member of the Committee for the First Amendment, October 1, 1947

In September 1947, the House Committee on Un-American Activities (HUAC) subpoenaed ten screenwriters and directors (known later as the "Hollywood Ten") as part of an investigation into "subversive" elements in the film industry. Immediately, a large group of movie luminaries, including Hayden, formed the Committee for the First Amendment to protest what they perceived as political harassment. In the next few years, as the Second Red Scare gripped the U.S., the HUAC expanded its probe to include all entertainment industry professionals with suspected links, past or present, to the CPUSA. Consequently, Hayden became a target.

In 1950, fearful that "his past might cost him his future", the actor sought the aid of entertainment lawyer Martin Gang, known as the best "clearance lawyer" in Hollywood. Gang first sent a letter to FBI Director J. Edgar Hoover, asking about "an unnamed client who had joined the Party as a youthful indiscretion, now regretted it, and wanted to clear his name." Hoover recommended talking to the local FBI people, "so that if anybody subsequently makes a complaint we'll know he [the unnamed client] is all right as far as we're concerned. Gang then met with HUAC Chief Counsel Frank Tavenner to work out an acceptable format for Hayden's testimony.

Upon Gang's advice—and in a decision that would haunt Hayden—the actor agreed to become a "friendly witness" and "name names". He later said, "the FBI made it very clear to me that, if I became an 'unfriendly witness', I could damn well forget the custody of my children. I didn't want to go to jail, that was the other thing." The HUAC subpoenaed Hayden in late March 1951. On April 10, he testified before the Committee in Washington, D.C. that joining the Party was "the stupidest and most ignorant thing I have ever done in my life". He added that after he quit the Party, actress Karen Morley tried to persuade him to rejoin but he refused.

Due to his decorated war service in the Marines, and his decision to cooperate with the committee, Hayden received favorable press coverage during this period. But Victor Navasky wrote that the actor "named his former mistress, Bea Winters (his agent's secretary), who had recruited him into the Party. He also named, among others, Robert Lees, Karen Morley, Maurice Murphy, and Abraham Lincoln Polonsky. The result was that he ended up as a hero to the public but a coward to himself". For decades afterward, Hayden expressed remorse over his testimony. In his autobiography he wrote, "I don't think you have the foggiest notion of the contempt I have had for myself since the day I did that thing." Because of his cooperative testimony, Hayden was "cleared" by the HUAC and avoided the Hollywood blacklist.

=== 1950s film career ===
In the 1951 film Journey into Light, Hayden portrayed a minister who doubts his faith. He had a prominent role alongside Bette Davis in The Star (1952). He followed these two performances with a series of action films: Denver and Rio Grande (1952), a Western for Paramount; Hellgate (1952), another Western; The Golden Hawk (1952), a pirate swashbuckler for producer Sam Katzman; Flat Top (1952), a Korean War drama; and Fighter Attack (1953), a World War II film.

Regular leading and supporting roles brought Hayden a substantial income. In November 1952, at the start of his lengthy divorce from his second wife, Betty Ann de Noon (whom he married in 1947), it was revealed in court proceedings that he made $100,000 in 1951.

In 1953, he co-starred with Jane Wyman in So Big, a melodrama adapted from an Edna Ferber novel. He then returned to medium-budget action films: Take Me to Town (1953), a Western with Ann Sheridan; Kansas Pacific (1953), a Western for Walter Mirisch; and Crime Wave (1954), a film noir.

Hayden had a supporting role in a major studio picture, Prince Valiant (1954), playing Sir Gawain. He followed it with a conventional Western "B picture", Arrow in the Dust (1954). At first his next project, Johnny Guitar (1954), seemed like just another Western, but this one starred Joan Crawford and was directed by Nicholas Ray. It became a box office hit and a cult favorite. It was financed by Republic Pictures, which used Hayden on several other occasions.

He was cast in more film noirs: Naked Alibi (1954) with Gloria Grahame and Suddenly (1954) with Frank Sinatra. Then it was action films: Battle Taxi (1955), about helicopter rescue teams in the Korean War; Timberjack (1955), a Western for Republic; Shotgun (1955), a Western with Yvonne de Carlo; The Eternal Sea (1955), a World War II naval story; Top Gun (1955), a Western for producer Edward Small.

The Last Command (1955) was a Republic Pictures film about the Alamo, with Hayden as Jim Bowie. The Come On (1956) was a film noir with Anne Baxter. Hayden also began obtaining acting jobs on TV shows such as Celebrity Playhouse.

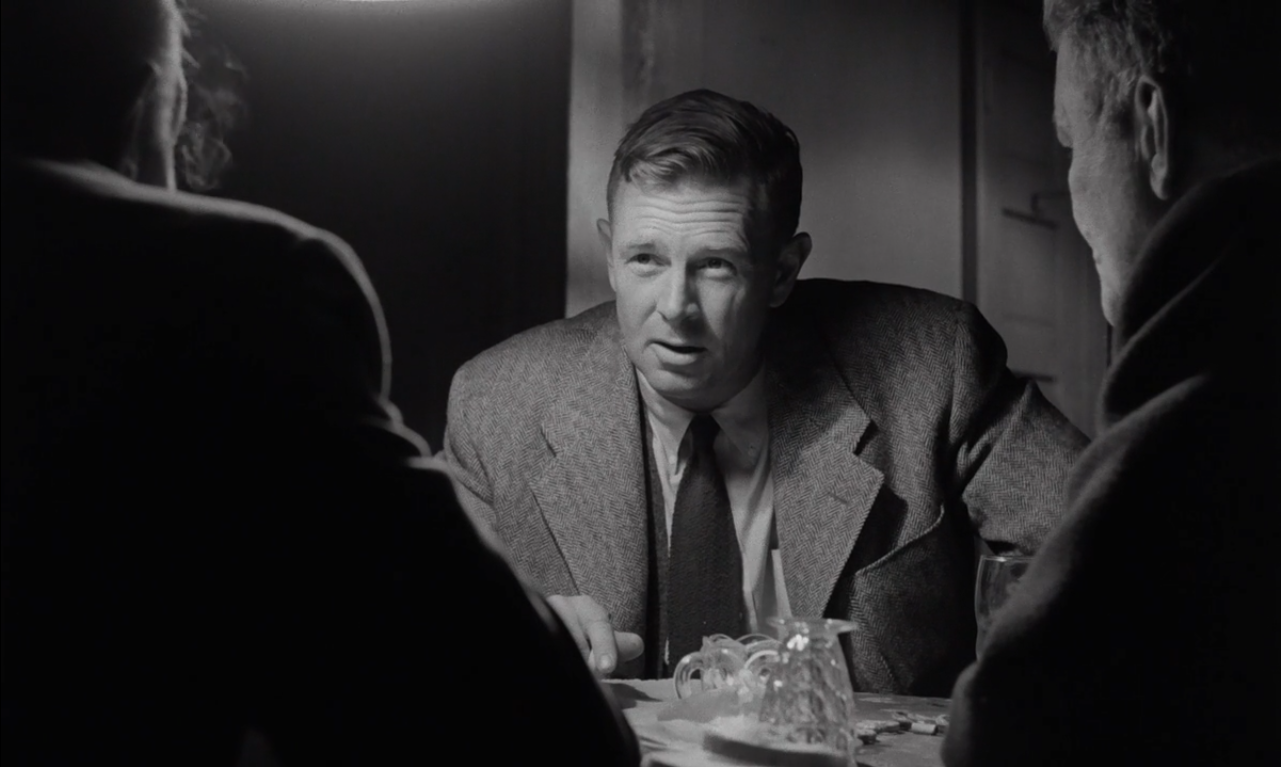
Sterling Hayden in The Killing

In 1956, Hayden starred in a heist film, The Killing, by an up-and-coming filmmaker named Stanley Kubrick. Although The Killing fared poorly at the box office, it garnered strong critical praise. Hayden would work again later with Kubrick on Dr. Strangelove (1964).

Notwithstanding his occasional appearances in acclaimed films, Hayden remained a "B picture" star in the 1950s: Crime of Passion (1957), a noir; 5 Steps to Danger (1957), a mystery film; Valerie (1957), a Western "noir"; Zero Hour! (1957), a disaster film; Gun Battle at Monterey (1957), a Western; The Iron Sheriff (1957), a Western for Edward Small; Ten Days to Tulara (1958), an adventure film; Terror in a Texas Town (1958), a Western.

He also worked frequently on television, in shows such as Dick Powell's Zane Grey Theatre, Wagon Train, General Electric Theater, Schlitz Playhouse, Playhouse 90, Goodyear Theatre, and The DuPont Show of the Month.

=== Traveling ===
Hayden often professed distaste for film acting, saying he did it mainly to pay for his schooners and voyages. In 1958, after a bitter divorce from Betty Ann de Noon, Hayden was awarded custody of their four children. In 1959, he defied a court order, which barred him from taking the children out of the U.S., by sailing to Tahiti with all four: Christian, Dana, Gretchen and Matthew.

The crew sailed from San Francisco Bay to Tahiti, where Hayden had planned to film a movie. He also invited along the well-known photographer Dody Weston Thompson to document the trip and to help shoot location choices. Her South Seas folio contains photographs of Hayden's 98-foot schooner, Wanderer; on-deck photos of life aboard the ship; colorful prints of his children, as well as Tahitian women and children; and unique artifacts on shore. The film never materialized; however, according to Dody's notes, U.S. Camera and Travel printed her photographs of paradise in 1961. Marin County Superior Court Judge Harold Haley later ordered Hayden to repay Republic Pictures nearly $50,000 to recover the cost of financing the trip.

In 1960, he married Catherine Devine McConnell. They had two sons, Andrew and David, and were married until his death in 1986. McConnell also had a son (Scott McConnell) from her first marriage to Neil McConnell, an heir to Avon's founding family.

In November 1960, Hayden said he was a "sailor or writer" rather than an actor. He was still troubled by his HUAC testimony and was quoted as saying, "I'd had it... One way or another, I felt that I had sold out – or failed – at almost everything in my whole life. It was either turn things around or hang myself."

In the early 1960s, he rented one of the pilot houses of the retired ferryboat Berkeley, docked in Sausalito, California, where he lived while writing his autobiography Wanderer, which was first published in 1963.

=== Later career ===
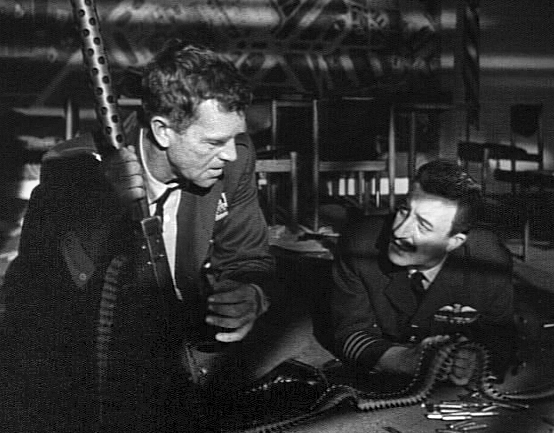
Sterling Hayden with Peter Sellers in Dr. Strangelove

In 1963, Stanley Kubrick coaxed Hayden out of retirement to play one of his best-known characters, the deranged General Jack D. Ripper in Dr. Strangelove (1964). In that same year, Hayden appeared in A Carol for Another Christmas on television.

In 1964 Hayden joined Mark Lane's Citizens Committee of Inquiry. He bought a canal barge in the Netherlands in 1969, eventually moving it to the heart of Paris and living on it part of the year. He also kept a home in Wilton, Connecticut with his family, and he had an apartment in Sausalito.

Hayden returned to acting with Hard Contract (1969), supporting James Coburn, and Loving (1970), co-starring George Segal and Eva Marie Saint. "I'll go back to Hollywood to pick up a dollar, but that's all", he said. "Everything is wrong with that city."

He went to Europe where he appeared in Ternos Caçadores (1970), Angel's Leap (1971) and Le grand départ (1972). He had small but important parts in The Godfather (1972) and The Long Goodbye (1973). He did more films in Europe: The Final Programme (1973), Deadly Strangers (1975), Cipolla Colt (1975) and 1900 (1975). He was offered the role of "Quint" in Jaws (1975) but turned it down.

In the 1970s, after his performance in The Godfather reintroduced him to American audiences, Hayden was a guest several times on NBC's Tomorrow Show with Tom Snyder. In the interviews, Hayden was sporting a long, scraggly beard. He talked about his career resurgence and how it had funded his travels and adventures around the world. He also appeared on the Canadian sci-fi TV series The Starlost, and the American detective show Banacek.

He returned to Hollywood for King of the Gypsies (1978), Winter Kills (1979), The Outsider (1980), 9 to 5 (1980), Gas (1981), Venom (1981) and The Blue and the Gray (1982).

In 1981, he was arrested for possession of hashish at Toronto International Airport.

Hayden wrote two acclaimed books: an autobiography, Wanderer (1963), and a novel, Voyage (1976). He said they made him "a lot of money" but he lost most of it to taxes.

In 1983, he appeared in a documentary of his life, Pharos of Chaos.

=== Family ===
Hayden's first wife was actress Madeleine Carroll.

In 1947 he married Betty Ann de Noon, and they had four children.

Hayden was later married to Catherine Devine McConnell from 1960 until his death. They had two children, Andrew and David.

=== Death ===
Hayden died of prostate cancer in Sausalito in 1986, age 70.

== Military awards ==
Hayden received the following awards during World War II:

Silver Star Medal
American Campaign Medal
European-African-Middle Eastern Campaign Medal with Arrowhead Device and 1 bronze service star
World War II Victory Medal

== References in popular culture ==
Hayden, under his nom de guerre Lieutenant John Hamilton, and in his role as an OSS agent, appears as a secondary figure in James R. Benn's 2012 novel Death's Door, which was part of the Billy Boyle World War II Mystery series. Hayden/Hamilton assists in getting protagonist Billy Boyle through German-occupied Italy.

In the 1975 film Three Days of the Condor, when John Houseman's CIA character, Mr. Wabash, is asked if he served in the OSS during World War II under Colonel Bill Donovan, Wabash replies, "I sailed the Adriatic with a movie star at the helm. It doesn't seem like much of a war now, but it was." He was referring to Sterling Hayden, who was attached to the OSS at the time.

In the 2020 film Friend of the World, the General Gore character portrayed by Nick Young is juxtaposed with Hayden's General Jack D. Ripper character from Dr. Strangelove.

== Bibliography ==
- Wanderer (1st ed.). New York: Knopf. 1963. LCCN 63020142. OCLC 721751.
- Voyage: A Novel of 1896. New York: Putnam. 1976. ISBN 0-399-11665-6.

== See also ==
- Leuchtturm des Chaos, a 1983 documentary profile of Sterling Hayden

== Footnotes ==
=== References ===
- Hayden, Sterling (1977). Wanderer. New York: Norton. ISBN 0-393-07521-4.
- Hayden, Sterling (1998). Wanderer. Dobbs Ferry: Sheridan House. ISBN 978-1-57409-048-2.
