= College Humor (film) =

1933 film

- Theatrical release poster
- Directed by: Wesley Ruggles
- Screenplay by: Claude Binyon; Frank Butler
- Story by: Dean Fales
- Produced by: William LeBaron
- Starring: Bing Crosby; Jack Oakie; Richard Arlen; Mary Carlisle
- Cinematography: Leo Tover
- Production company: Paramount Pictures
- Distributed by: Paramount Pictures
- Release date: July 5, 1933 (USA)
- Running time: 80 minutes
- Country: United States
- Language: English

College Humor is a 1933 American pre-Code musical comedy film, directed by Wesley Ruggles, and starring Bing Crosby, Jack Oakie, Richard Arlen, Mary Kornman and Mary Carlisle. Based on a story by Dean Fales, the film is about a college professor and the school's star football player who become rivals for the same beautiful student. Released by Paramount Pictures, the film co-stars George Burns and Gracie Allen.

== Plot ==
Barney Shirrel starts his first semester at Mid West University and works his way up in the fraternity with the help of Tex Roust and Mondrake, an alcoholic college football star. Barney is passionate about engineering and the law, and between his varied studies, football, and the fraternity, he neglects his girlfriend Amber. In the next term, Mondrake gives his class sweater to Barney's sister Barbara. His drinking problem intensifies, however, when he learns that Barbara is falling in love with Professor Danvers, the singing drama teacher. When Mondrake fails to show up at an important football game against a rival university, Danvers finds him in jail. With the school's reputation at stake, Danvers has him released and takes him to the football field in time to play in the game.

Afterwards, Danvers is called before the college president. Although rivals for Barbara's affections, Danvers stands up for Mondrake. The college president expels Mondrake for drunkenness and forces Danvers to resign because of his involvement in the matter. Feeling guilty over causing Mondrake's expulsion, Barbara proposes marriage to him. Later, however, she admits that she is not in love with him, but with Danvers. Mondrake bows out of the relationship, and Barbara rushes to Danvers' side before he leaves.

During the next term, Barney has followed Mondrake's example and taken up drinking and smoking, which is not appealing to Amber. At the big football game, Barney is in sorry shape. Mid West is losing until he receives inspiration from Tex, who has returned to watch the game. After being knocked out, Barney recovers and wins the game for Mid West. Some time later, Barney and Amber get married and they move to his father's dairy, where Barney works his way up from the lowest position. Barney and Amber enjoy listening to Danvers singing his song on the radio.

== Cast ==
- Bing Crosby as Professor Frederick Danvers
- Jack Oakie as Barney Shirrel
- Richard Arlen as Mondrake
- Mary Carlisle as Barbara Shirrel
- George Burns as George
- Gracie Allen as Gracie
- Mary Kornman as Amber
- Joe Sawyer as Tex
- Lona Andre as Ginger
- Jimmy Conlin as Dr. Mandel
- James Donlan as Marcus Lafflin
- James Burke as Cromwell Dexter
- Edward J. Nugent as Whistler
- Lumsden Hare as College president
- Grady Sutton as Timid freshman

== Production ==
=== Soundtrack ===
- "Medley" by Bing Crosby, comprising "Just an Echo in the Valley", "Learn to Croon", Please", I Surrender Dear" and "Just One More Chance".
- "Down the Old Ox Road" (Arthur Johnston and Sam Coslow) by Bing Crosby, Jack Oakie, Mary Kornman, and chorus
- "Learn to Croon" (Arthur Johnston and Sam Coslow) by Bing Crosby
- "Moonstruck" (Arthur Johnston and Sam Coslow) by Bing Crosby

Crosby recorded the songs for Brunswick Records and "Learn to Croon" and "Down the Old Ox Road" reached the charts of the day peaking at No. 3 and No. 8 respectively.

== Reception ==
The reception was generally favorable, although The New York Times commented: "Looked at as a whole, it emerges as an unsteady entertainment, with no very discernible intent, theme or goal, but with a modest fund of humor and two or three heartily amusing patches...Mr. Oakie’s owlish efforts to assimilate an education help the comedy along and Miss Carlisle is a very model of a model musical comedy co-ed. Mr. Arlen is reliably pleasant. Variety liked it better. "Between Crosby for romance and Oakie for laughs, the picture has a strong pair of male leads...Crosby makes his best showing to date with a chance to handle both light comedy and romance. His pale face makeup is the only flaw so it looks like all he needs is a new paint job and another good role."

The reaction in Hollywood was more enthusiastic with The Hollywood Reporter saying: "‘College Humor’, by the way, is drawing the longest lines that have been seen in some time and people are getting all excited over a new discovery—Bing Crosby. They've suddenly discovered what a grand personality the lad has, even when he isn't singing. The public is sometimes slow, but always proud of its discoveries."

== See also ==
- List of American football films
