= Invitation to Happiness =

1939 film by Wesley Ruggles

- Theatrical release poster
- Directed by: Wesley Ruggles
- Screenplay by: Claude Binyon
- Story by: Mark Jerome
- Produced by: Wesley Ruggles
- Starring: Irene Dunne; Fred MacMurray; Charlie Ruggles; Billy Cook; William Collier, Sr. Marion Martin
- Cinematography: Leo Tover
- Edited by: Alma Macrorie
- Music by: Friedrich Hollaender
- Production company: Paramount Pictures
- Distributed by: Paramount Pictures
- Release date: June 16, 1939
- Running time: 97 minutes
- Country: United States
- Language: English

Invitation to Happiness is a 1939 American drama film directed by Wesley Ruggles and written by Claude Binyon. The film stars Irene Dunne, Fred MacMurray, Charlie Ruggles, Billy Cook, William Collier, Sr. and Marion Martin. The film was released on June 16, 1939, by Paramount Pictures.

== Plot ==
Albert 'King' Cole is a talented heavyweight boxer who has potential to achieve the championship. At least his trainer, Henry 'Pop' Hardy thinks so. Hardy brings in his friend Mr. Wayne to sponsor Cole. Cole meets Mr. Wayne's daughter, Eleanor who is arrogant, but Cole manages to catch Eleanor's attention. Will they overcome their differences and obstacles and be together?

== Cast ==
- Irene Dunne as Eleanor Wayne
- Fred MacMurray as Albert 'King' Cole
- Charlie Ruggles as Henry 'Pop' Hardy
- Billy Cook as Albert Cole Jr.
- William Collier, Sr. as Mr. Wayne
- Marion Martin as Lola Snow
- Oscar O'Shea as Divorce Judge
- Burr Caruth as Butler
- Eddie Hogan as The Champ

== Production credits ==
- Wesley Ruggles - producer, director
- Claude Binyon - screenplay
- Mark Jerome - story
- Leo Tover - photography
- Farciot Edouart - process photography
- Hans Dreier - art direction
- Ernst Fegté - art direction
- Alma Macrorie - editor
- Edith Head - costumes
- Early Hayman - sound recording
- Richard Olson - sound recording
- A. E. Freudeman - interior decorations
- Frederick Hollander - musical score
