= The Bride Comes Home =

1935 film by Wesley Ruggles

- Theatrical release poster
- Directed by: Wesley Ruggles
- Screenplay by: Claude Binyon
- Story by: Elisabeth Sanxay Holding
- Produced by: Wesley Ruggles
- Starring: Claudette Colbert; Fred MacMurray; Robert Young
- Cinematography: Leo Tover
- Edited by: Paul Weatherwax
- Music by: Heinz Roemheld
- Production company: Paramount Pictures
- Distributed by: Paramount Pictures
- Release date: December 25, 1935 (USA)
- Running time: 83 minutes
- Country: United States
- Language: English

The Bride Comes Home is a 1935 American comedy film made by Paramount Pictures, directed by Wesley Ruggles, and starring Claudette Colbert, Fred MacMurray and Robert Young. It was written by Claude Binyon and Elisabeth Sanxay Holding.

== Plot ==
After the bankruptcy of her father's business, penniless Chicago socialite Jeannette Desmereau works with magazine editor Cyrus Anderson and publisher Jack Bristow. They discuss love and wedding plans. However, when Bristow and Desmereau set in motion plans to marry, Anderson decides to win her back. This is a romantic comedy with money, bad tempers and love in the balance.

== Cast ==
- Claudette Colbert as Jeannette Desmereau
- Fred MacMurray as Cyrus Anderson
- Robert Young as Jack Bristow
- William Collier, Sr. as Alfred Desmereau
- Donald Meek as The judge
- Richard Carle as Frank (butler)
- Edgar Kennedy as Henry
- Johnny Arthur as Otto
- Kate MacKenna as Emma
- Jimmy Conlin as Len Noble
- Edward Gargan as Cab driver

== Critical reception ==
Writing for The Spectator in 1936, Graham Greene strongly praised the film as "satirical comedy of a very high order". Emphasizing the performance given by Claudette Colbert, Greene suggested that Colbert's having been given a third role in film (following It Happened One Night and She Married Her Boss) made fact of the claim that "Miss Colbert is the most charming light-comedy actress on the screen". The film was a box-office hit.
