= I Met Him in Paris =

1937 film

- Theatrical release poster
- Directed by: Wesley Ruggles
- Written by: Claude Binyon; Helen Meinardi (story)
- Produced by: Adolph Zukor
- Starring: Claudette Colbert; Melvyn Douglas; Robert Young
- Cinematography: Leo Tover
- Edited by: Otho Lovering
- Music by: Boris Morros
- Production company: Paramount Pictures
- Distributed by: Paramount Pictures
- Release date: June 2, 1937
- Running time: 86 minutes
- Country: United States
- Language: English

I Met Him in Paris is a 1937 American comedy film directed by Wesley Ruggles and starring Claudette Colbert, Melvyn Douglas, and Robert Young. It written by Claude Binyon and produced by Paramount Pictures. It was the first film shown at Washington, D.C.'s Newton Theater when it opened in the Brookland neighborhood on July 29, 1937.

== Plot ==
Kay Denham is engaged to Berk Sutter, but wishes to take a vacation in Europe without him, prior to the wedding. He is dubious, but reluctantly agrees. She quickly finds that in Paris, as a woman traveling alone, she is approached by men with designs on her. Eventually, she meets Gene Anders, who claims to only want to protect her from other men and to want a “platonic” friendship. However, his friend George Potter knows that Gene is married, and decides to protect her from him. The trio engage in a variety of Winter sports in Switzerland, as well as having multiple arguments and accusations of betrayal. Eventually, Kay learns the truth about Gene, discards Berk, and falls in love with George.

== Cast ==
- Claudette Colbert as Kay Denham
- Melvyn Douglas as George Potter
- Robert Young as Gene Anders
- Lee Bowman as Berk Sutter
- Mona Barrie as Helen Anders
- George Davis as Cutter Driver
- Fritz Feld as Hotel Clerk
- Rudolph Anders as Romantic Waiter
- Alexander Cross as John Hanley
- George Sorel as Hotel Clerk
- Louis LaBey as a Bartender
- Egon Brecher as Emile, Upper Tower Man
- Hans Joby as the Lower Tower Man
- Jacques Vanaire as the French Masher
- Eugene Borden as a Headwaiter

== See also ==
- 1937 in film
