= You Belong to Me (1941 film) =

1941 film by Wesley Ruggles

- Theatrical release poster
- Directed by: Wesley Ruggles
- Screenplay by: Claude Binyon
- Story by: Dalton Trumbo
- Produced by: Wesley Ruggles
- Starring: Barbara Stanwyck; Henry Fonda; Edgar Buchanan
- Cinematography: Joseph Walker
- Edited by: Viola Lawrence
- Music by: Friedrich Hollaender
- Production company: Columbia Pictures
- Distributed by: Columbia Pictures
- Release date: October 22, 1941 (US)
- Running time: 95 minutes
- Country: United States
- Language: English

You Belong to Me is a 1941 American romantic comedy film produced and directed by Wesley Ruggles and starring Barbara Stanwyck, Henry Fonda and Edgar Buchanan. Based on a story by Dalton Trumbo, and written by Claude Binyon, the film is about a wealthy man who meets and falls in love with a beautiful doctor while on a ski trip. After a courtship complicated by his hypochondria, she agrees to marry him on the condition that she continue to practice medicine. His jealousy at the thought of her seeing male patients, however, soon threatens their marriage. The film was released in the United Kingdom as Good Morning, Doctor, and was remade as Emergency Wedding in 1950.

A print is held by the Library of Congress.

== Plot ==
Doctor Helen Hunt meets millionaire playboy, Peter Kirk in an unusual way—he crashes practically at her feet at a ski resort. He insists only she can treat his minor injuries and he soon proposes marriage, which she accepts. On their wedding night, Helen is called away by a medical emergency. When she returns, Peter has fallen asleep. Peter becomes jealous and gets into confrontations with two of her patients, Robert Andrews, and Frederick Vandemer. He is chagrined to learn that Vandemer had also staged a skiing accident to get to know Helen and Vandemer asked her to marry him.

Helen recruits Billings, Peter's groundskeeper, to try unsuccessfully to interest the idle Peter in gardening. After another very embarrassing altercation with Frederick, Peter gets a job as a tie salesman under the alias "John Jenkins" to try to please his wife. Peter finds he likes working and becomes ambitious. Helen is delighted and decides to retire and become a housewife. However, some of Kirk's co-workers at the department store recognize him and resent him taking a job away from somebody who actually needs it. The incident results in his firing. Billings gives Peter an idea to create jobs with his money. Peter decides to buy a nearly-bankrupt hospital, which will require most of his income to keep running, and makes Helen the chief of staff.

== Cast ==
- Barbara Stanwyck as Helen Kirk
- Henry Fonda as Peter Kirk
- Edgar Buchanan as Billings
- Roger Clark as Frederick Vandemer
- Ruth Donnelly as Emma
- Melville Cooper as Moody
- Ralph Peters as Joseph
- Maude Eburne as Ella
- Renie Riano as Minnie
- Ellen Lowe as Eva
- Mary Treen as Doris
- Gordon Jones as Robert Andrews
- Fritz Feld as Hotel Clerk
- Paul Harvey as Barrows
- Georgia Backus as Attendant (uncredited)
- Sidney Bracey as Frederick Vandemer's Butler (uncredited)
- Lloyd Bridges as Ski Patrol (uncredited)
- Stanley Brown as Ski Patrol (uncredited)
- Georgia Caine as Necktie Customer (uncredited)
- Jeff Corey as Mr. Greener (uncredited)
- Lester Dorr as Photographer (uncredited)
- Howard C. Hickman as Mr. Deker (uncredited)
- Sam McDaniel as Pierre (uncredited)
- George Lessey as Marshall (uncredited)
- Arthur Loft as Reporter (uncredited)

== Reception ==
The film opened on October 22, 1941, to positive reviews.

Bosley Crowther commented that "These tensile marital comedies, strung out on a very thin line, have a way of snapping in the middle unless written and acted to the hilt. This one is fortunate in having a smart script as foundation - bright and easy dialogue and cute situations. It is directed by Wesley Ruggles in a brisk and amiable style, and it is well supported by a cast including Fritz Feld, Edgar Buchanan and Melville Cooper. But the best thing about it is its principals, Mr. Fonda and Miss Stanwyck. He, with his loose-jointed blunderings and charming diffidence, and she with her forthright manner and ability to make a man forget are a right team for this sort of dalliance. You Belong To Me is a bit of well-turned fun."

Variety also praised the performances of Fonda and Stanwyck, which "merit fulsome praise. Their strokes are keen and deft regardless of whether they're playing farce, romance, or the film's more serious moments. Fonda, cast as a rich playboy who suffers a skiing fall and recovers with a medical wife, proves again that he is endowed with a high flair for comedy."
