= Too Many Husbands (1940 film) =

1940 film by Wesley Ruggles

- 1940 theatrical poster
- Directed by: Wesley Ruggles
- Screenplay by: Claude Binyon
- Based on: Too Many Husbands; 1919 play by W. Somerset Maugham
- Produced by: Wesley Ruggles
- Starring: Jean Arthur; Fred MacMurray; Melvyn Douglas
- Cinematography: Joseph Walker
- Edited by: William A. Lyon; Otto Meyer
- Music by: Friedrich Hollaender
- Production company: Columbia Pictures
- Distributed by: Columbia Pictures
- Release date: March 21, 1940
- Running time: 84 minutes
- Country: United States
- Language: English

Too Many Husbands (released in the United Kingdom as My Two Husbands) is a 1940 American romantic comedy film directed by Wesley Ruggles, starring Jean Arthur, Fred MacMurray and Melvyn Douglas. The plot centres on a woman who believes her husband has perished in a boating accident and remarries, only to have her first spouse reappear. The film is based on the 1919 W. Somerset Maugham play Home and Beauty, which was itself retitled Too Many Husbands when it came to New York, and itself takes inspiration from the 1864 Alfred, Lord Tennyson poem Enoch Arden.

In April 1947, a radio adaptation of the film starring Lucille Ball, Bob Hope and Frank Sinatra aired as an episode of The Screen Guild Theater. In 1955, the film was remade as Three for the Show, a musical starring Jack Lemmon and Betty Grable.

== Plot ==
Vicky Lowndes loses her first husband, Bill Cardew, when he is lost at sea, presumed drowned, and declared legally dead. The lonely widow is comforted by Bill's best friend and publishing business partner, Henry Lowndes. Six months later, she marries Henry. Six months after that, Vicky is disappointed to see that Henry is removing Bill's name from his old office, believing that Henry's name should remain as a memorial to her late husband.

On the day his name is removed from his office, Bill shows up, after having been stranded on an uninhabited island and then rescued. He calls home and speaks with Vicky's father, George, convincing his skeptical father-in-law that he has returned. Bill asks George to have Vicky meet him at the airport that evening. When George breaks the news to Vicky, she is appalled at having to tell Bill but does so with her father's help. Vicky wants Bill to meet Henry at the airport and break the news, but Bill insists on accompanying her while she informs Henry. Vicky has a hard time, and Bill must stand by while Henry embraces and kisses Vicky and tries to get Bill to leave. When Vicky finally explains, Henry accuses Bill of having faked evidence of his death to avoid the 5-year waiting period for a missing person to be declared dead. Although Henry initially declares he will withdraw, Vicky does not want him to do so.

Faced with a tough choice, Vicky initially says the men must choose among themselves. Distrusting each other, two men sleep in a shared bedroom, keeping an eye out to make sure neither tries to enter Vicky's room. Both men try to win Vicky over, while her father disapproves of the “scandal” of two husbands under the same roof. She confesses to her father that she likes the idea of the two men competing for her. Each had become inattentive in marriage, Bill by extensive traveling without her and Henry constantly occupied with business.

Vicky's father keeps pushing her to decide, reminding Vicky that the law forbids her having two husbands. The men decide to draw lots for a paper marked by an “X” to determine who gets to stay, and Bill draws a losing blank paper, but finds that Henry has cheated by leaving both papers blank and letting Bill draw first. The men end up in a fight to reveal Henry's blank slip of paper, which he attempts to swallow. Vicky continues to vacillate while both men play on her reminiscences of their good times together.

The two men get tired of Vicky's vacillation and take off together to punish her. After hours of their being “missing”, Vicky calls the police Missing Persons bureau and—with a slip of the tongue—reports her husbands missing when she must explain her relationship to each. After the men return, the police arrive and “Mrs. Lowndes” explains that there has been a misunderstanding, and that Mr. Cardew is a “friend.” The butler and Vicky's father confirm she is married to “Mr. Lowndes,” but the police trick her by addressing her as “Mrs. Cardew” and she responds.

The scandal is exposed in the newspapers. The judge rules that Vicky's bigamy is unintentional, but she is legally still married to Bill. Vicky and Bill express sympathy for Henry's disappointment and exclusion.

Bill takes Vicky to a celebratory dinner that evening, and Henry joins them to Bill's chagrin. Bill wants Henry to leave, but Henry says he is staying. Giving Bill travel brochures, Henry declares that he is certain Bill will get the urge to travel again, and he will be waiting. Henry asks Vicky for a consolation dance, and she agrees. Bill and Henry keep cutting in to replace each other dancing with Vicky. The film ends with Vicky dancing with BOTH Bill and Henry as a threesome, with Vicky gleefully exclaiming “We’ll have to do this often!”

== Cast ==
- Jean Arthur as Vicky Lowndes
- Fred MacMurray as Bill Cardew
- Melvyn Douglas as Henry Lowndes
- Harry Davenport as George, Vicky's father
- Dorothy Peterson as Gertrude Houlihan, Henry's secretary
- Melville Cooper as Peter, the Lowndeses' butler
- Edgar Buchanan as Detective Adolph McDermott
- Tom Dugan as Lieutenant Sullivan

== Nomination ==
John P. Livadary was nominated for an Academy Award for Best Sound Recording.

== My Favorite Wife ==
Released several months after Too Many Husbands, My Favorite Wife tells a similar story with the gender dynamic reversed, starring Cary Grant as the remarried spouse whose former wife Irene Dunne returns from sea. In the early 1960s there were plans to remake this film as Something's Got to Give with Marilyn Monroe and Dean Martin, but this was aborted due to Monroe's death. Instead, Move Over, Darling was released in 1963 with Doris Day and James Garner.
