= The Lady Is Willing (1942 film) =

1942 film by Mitchell Leisen

The Lady is Willing
- Film poster
- Directed by: Mitchell Leisen
- Screenplay by: James Edward Grant; Albert McCleery
- Story by: James Edward Grant
- Produced by: Mitchell Leisen
- Starring: Marlene Dietrich; Fred MacMurray; Aline MacMahon; Stanley Ridges; Arline Judge; Roger Clark
- Cinematography: Ted Tetzlaff
- Edited by: Eda Warren
- Music by: W. Franke Harling "I Find You" (song) by Jack King (music) and Gordon Clifford (lyrics)
- Distributed by: Columbia Pictures
- Release date: February 12, 1942
- Running time: 92 minutes
- Country: United States
- Language: English

The Lady is Willing is a 1942 American screwball comedy film directed by Mitchell Leisen, produced by Columbia Pictures and starring Marlene Dietrich and Fred MacMurray.

== Plot ==
Stage actress Elizabeth Madden finds an abandoned baby and discovers a longing to be a mother. To adopt the baby, however, she must be married. To that end she convinces divorced pediatrician Dr. Corey McBain to marry her.

== Cast ==
- Marlene Dietrich as Elizabeth Madden-McBain
- Fred MacMurray as Dr. Corey T. McBain
- Aline MacMahon as Buddy
- Stanley Ridges as Kenneth Hanline
- Arline Judge as Frances, the first Mrs. McBain
- Roger Clark as Victor
- Marietta Canty as Mary Lou, the housekeeper
- David James as Baby Corey
- Ruth Ford as Myrtle
- Harvey Stephens as Dr. Golding
- Harry Shannon as Detective Sergeant Barnes
- Elisabeth Risdon as Mrs. Cummings
- Charles Lane as K. K. Miller
- Murray Alper as Joe Quig
- Kitty Kelly as Nellie Quig

== Production ==
Marlene Dietrich broke her foot tripping on a little red wagon behind a couch early in filming. To hide her injury a double was used in some scenes.

Marlene Dietrich was frustrated by Fred MacMurray's unwillingness to have an affair with her on set. Director Mitchell Leisen told her, “Listen Marlene, Fred’s so much in love with his wife Lilly, he couldn’t care less about any other woman, so you lay off. Just make the picture; forget about making Fred.” MacMurray later recalled, “I had never had anything like this happen on a picture before and it was very embarrassing.”

== Reception ==
In a contemporary review for The New York Times, critic Bosley Crowther called The Lady Is Willing "a very stagy exhibition in rather revolting taste" and wrote: "Where it should be tender and simple it is maudlin and over-dressed. And where the romantic business should be delicate it is coarse and lickerish. ... The lady is too willing and not sufficiently sincere."
