= Next Time I Marry =

1938 film by Garson Kanin

- Theatrical release poster
- Directed by: Garson Kanin
- Screenplay by: John Twist; Helen Meinardi
- Story by: Thames Williamson
- Produced by: Cliff Reid
- Starring: Lucille Ball; James Ellison; Lee Bowman; Granville Bates; Mantan Moreland
- Cinematography: Russell Metty
- Edited by: Jack Hively
- Music by: Roy Webb
- Production company: RKO Pictures
- Distributed by: RKO Pictures
- Release date: December 9, 1938
- Running time: 65 minutes
- Country: United States
- Language: English

Next Time I Marry is a 1938 American comedy film directed by Garson Kanin and written by John Twist and Helen Meinardi. The film stars Lucille Ball, James Ellison, Lee Bowman, Granville Bates and Mantan Moreland. The film was released on December 9, 1938, by RKO Pictures.

== Plot ==
A young woman stands to inherit $20 million provided she marries an American citizen. Unfortunately, she is in love with a handsome foreigner. To get the money, she marries the first Yankee she runs across—with every intention of obtaining a quickie divorce in Reno as soon as the money comes through. The bickersome newlyweds take a trailer and set off across the country to Reno, but through a series of zany mishaps and adventures they realize that they are slowly falling in love.

== Cast ==
- Lucille Ball as Nancy Crocker Fleming
- James Ellison as Anthony J. Anthony
- Lee Bowman as Count Georgi
- Granville Bates as H.E. Crocker
- Mantan Moreland as Tilby
- Elliott Sullivan as Red
- Murray Alper as Joe
- Ann Evers as Neeny
