= Helen Meinardi =

American screenwriter

- Born: July 7, 1909; Chicago, Illinois, USA
- Died: March 31, 1997; Carmel, California, USA
- Education: Indiana University
- Occupation: Screenwriter
- Relatives: Hoagy Carmichael (brother-in-law)

Helen Meinardi (1909-1997) was an American screenwriter and songwriter who wrote a string of films in the 1930s.

== Biography ==
Helen was born in Chicago, Illinois, to Garrett Meinardi and Sarah Henderson. Her parents separated when she was young, and her father won custody; however, Sarah briefly kidnapped Helen and Helen's younger sister, Ruth.

She attended the Lucy Cobb Finishing School in Georgia as a young woman before graduating from Indiana University. After college, she worked in New York City for a time before heading to Los Angeles, determined to forge a career for herself in Hollywood.

Helen began writing songs and screenplays in the 1930s; she wrote a number of songs for musician Hoagy Carmichael, who eventually became her brother-in-law. Helen won an RKO contract after writing the story that inspired the 1937 film I Met Him in Paris. In her later years, she worked as a journalist for CBS in New York before retiring to Maine.

== Selected filmography ==
- Cross-Country Romance (1940)
- Next Time I Marry (1938)
- Maid's Night Out (1938)
- I Met Him in Paris (1937)
- Our Blushing Brides (1930)
