= Kisses for My President =

1964 film by Curtis Bernhardt

- 1964 theatrical poster
- Directed by: Curtis Bernhardt
- Screenplay by: Claude Binyon; Robert G. Kane
- Story by: Robert G. Kane
- Produced by: Curtis Bernhardt
- Starring: Fred MacMurray; Polly Bergen; Eli Wallach
- Cinematography: Robert Surtees
- Edited by: Sam O'Steen
- Music by: Bronislau Kaper
- Production company: Pearlayne
- Distributed by: Warner Bros. Pictures
- Release date: December 4, 1964
- Running time: 113 minutes
- Country: United States
- Language: English

Kisses for My President is a 1964 American comedy film directed by Curtis Bernhardt, and starring Fred MacMurray and Polly Bergen. Leslie McCloud (Bergen) makes history when she is elected the first female president of the United States. However, her husband Thad McCloud (MacMurray) is less enthusiastic. The picture's supporting cast features Eli Wallach, Arlene Dahl, Edward Andrews, and Donald May.

Kisses for My President was the last theatrical film directed by Bernhardt, whose career stretched back to the silent era. While the movie was cited by the Hollywood Reporter as being the “first” to feature a woman president, Project Moon Base (1953) actually preceded it.

== Plot ==
The United States elects its first female president, Leslie Harrison McCloud. She and her husband Thad (he is never called "first gentleman"; he is called "first lady" a few times, but typically "president's husband") move into the White House with their daughter Gloria and son Peter.

Immediately, the new president is too busy for her husband and family as she deals with powerful opposition from Senator Walsh and a Central American dictator, Raphael Valdez Jr..

Thad attempts to find something meaningful to do as the president's husband. He is upset with his feminine bedroom and office within the White House.

Doris Reid Weaver, Thad's former flame and Leslie's classmate at Radcliffe, and now an international businesswoman, wants Thad back. During a seductive visit, she offers to make him vice president of her cosmetics company as bait. Leslie smells Doris's perfume on her husband that night and confronts him.

Leslie asks Thad to show visiting dictator Valdez around Washington, with disastrous results, as Thad brawls with a male diner at a burlesque show, and accidentally hits Valdez. To further complicate things, the First Daughter is running around town with a very unsuitable boyfriend and using her position to get out of scrapes with the police. First son Peter has become a bully, using his Secret Service men for protection as he terrorizes everyone in his school, including the principal.

The president's husband finds an important role in a Cold War subplot that resembles the rise and fall of Senator McCarthy, when Thad proves that Senator Walsh blindly supports the Latin American dictator for reasons that are not patriotic; the dictator is paying Walsh's old law firm in a lawsuit against Thad. Walsh aggressively portrays the lady president as weak in resisting communism because she refuses to give Valdez more foreign aid for his personal enrichment while he does nothing to alleviate poverty in his country. The Soviets are also co-funding Valdez to prevent him from being influenced exclusively by the United States. As soon as the president drops her support for the dictator, the Soviets do so as well.

Leslie then discovers that she is pregnant, and resigns the presidency to devote herself full-time to her family. Thad jokes about male superiority, that 40 million women voters put her into office, but only one man, himself, could remove her.

== Cast ==
- Fred MacMurray as Thad McCloud
- Polly Bergen as U.S. President Leslie McCloud
- Eli Wallach as Raphael Valdez Jr.
- Arlene Dahl as Doris Reid Weaver
- Edward Andrews as Sen. Walsh
- Donald May as Secret Service Agent John O'Connor
- Harry Holcombe as Vice President Bill Richards
- Ahna Capri as Gloria McCloud (as Anna Capri)
- Ronnie Dapo as Peter McCloud
- Richard St. John as Jackson
- Bill Walker as Joseph
- Adrienne Marden as Miss Higgins
- Wilbert G. Nuttycombe as Musician
- Norma Varden as Miss Dinsendorff
- John Banner as Soviet Ambassador
- Jon Lormer as Chief Justice of the United States
- Eleanor Audley as Principal Osgood
- Beverly Power as Nana Peel
- Lillian Bronson as Miss Currier

== Reception ==
Bosley Crowther of The New York Times panned the movie, commenting, "...All that one can say is that we hope the first woman to become President brings along a more amusing husband than Mr. MacMurray and a more imaginative team of writers than Mr. Binyon and Mr. Kane." He also criticized Bernhardt for taking "a dim view of the prospect of a woman as President. It wouldn't be funny! That's what his picture says."

== See also ==
- List of American films of 1964
