= The Gilded Lily (1935 film) =

1935 film by Wesley Ruggles

- Theatrical release poster
- Directed by: Wesley Ruggles
- Screenplay by: Claude Binyon
- Story by: Jack Kirkland; Melville Baker
- Produced by: Albert Lewis
- Starring: Claudette Colbert; Fred MacMurray; Ray Milland; C. Aubrey Smith; Edward Craven
- Cinematography: Victor Milner
- Edited by: Otho Lovering
- Music by: Arthur Johnson; Tom Satterfield; Sam Coslow
- Production company: Paramount Pictures
- Distributed by: Paramount Pictures
- Release date: January 25, 1935 (USA)
- Running time: 80 minutes, 7,452 ft (9 reels)
- Country: United States
- Language: English

The Gilded Lily (also known as One Night Like This) is a 1935 American romantic comedy film directed by Wesley Ruggles and starring Claudette Colbert, Fred MacMurray, Ray Milland, and C. Aubrey Smith. The production's screenplay, written by Claude Binyon, is about a stenographer who becomes a famous café entertainer courted by an English aristocrat and an American newspaper reporter.

Released by Paramount Pictures in the United States on January 25, 1935, the film is one of the English language films chosen by the National Board of Review for its top-10 list of 1935. The Gilded Lily is also the first of seven films in which Claudette Colbert and Fred MacMurray costar.

== Plot ==
Stenographer Marilyn David and newspaper reporter Peter Dawes meet every Thursday on a bench outside the New York Public Library to eat popcorn and watch the world go by. They discuss love and she tells him she only considers him a friend—that someday she will find love when she meets the right man.

Afterwards on the subway, Marilyn meets a wealthy English aristocrat, Lord Charles Gray Granton, who is visiting New York incognito as a commoner. After she helps him escape a confrontation with a subway guard, he walks her home and the two flirt with each other. He does not tell her that his father is the Duke of Loamshire, nor does he mention that he is engaged to an Englishwoman. In the coming days they go on dates to Coney Island and have dinner together, and soon they fall in love.

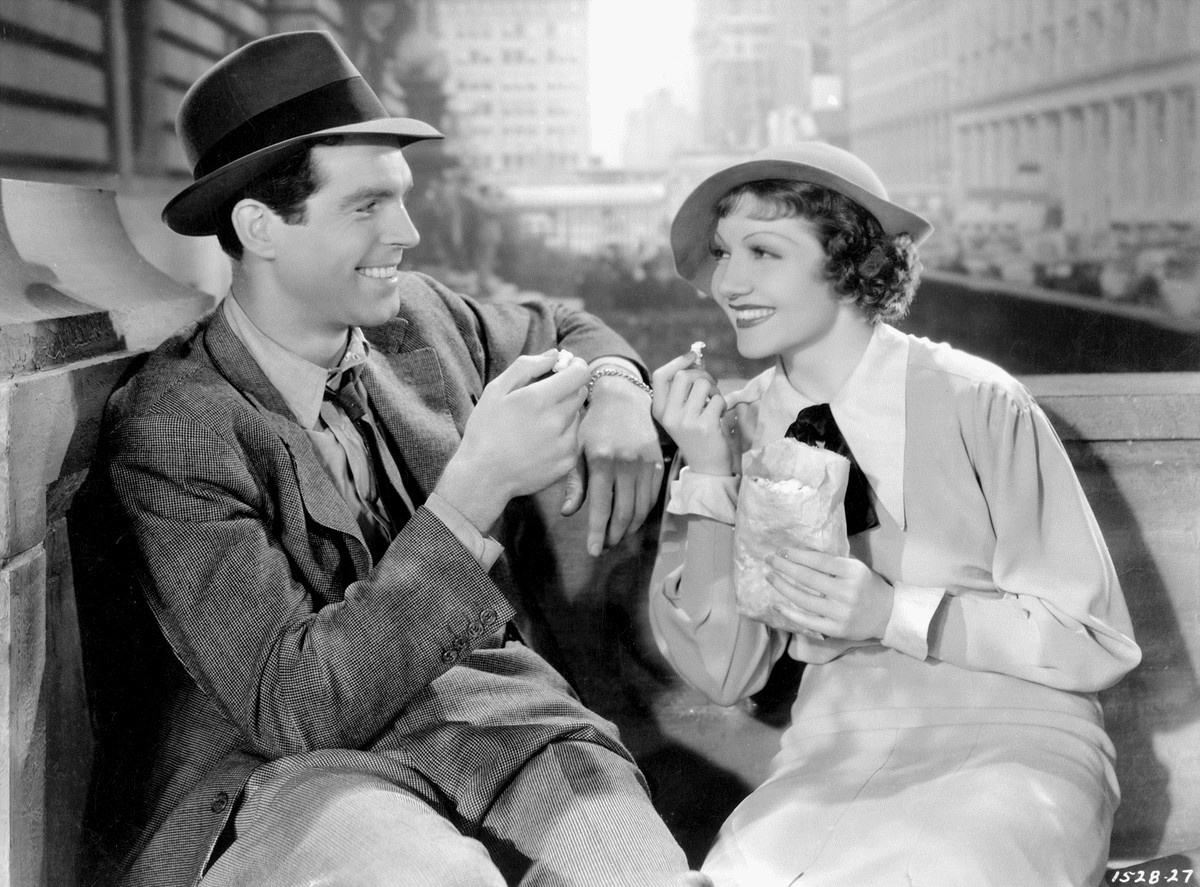
MacMurray and Colbert in still from film

At their next Thursday meeting, Marilyn reveals to Peter that she has fallen in love with someone. Disappointed, he tells her that things can never be the same between them, but assures her that he will always be there for her. When Charles' father, Lloyd Granton, learns that his son intends to propose to an American girl, he insists that they first return to England to break off his current engagement properly. Charles visits Marilyn before he leaves and—still not revealing his identity—tells her that he found a job and will be out of town on business for a few weeks.

The next day, Peter learns from his editor that the Duke of Loamshire and his son have been in New York for six weeks without the press being aware of it, and are preparing to sail back for England. While working on his usual shipping news column at the docks, Peter spots Duke Granton and his son Charles boarding a ship. After a brief interview, the duke gives Peter $100 to keep their names out of the newspapers. Annoyed at the duke's arrogance, Peter publishes his column the following day, complete with a photo of the Grantons.

When Marilyn sees that her "Charles" is in fact Lord Granton returning to England to marry his English fiancée—at least according to Peter's story—she rushes to her friend heartbroken and reveals that Charles is the man she's been dating. Believing that Charles was simply using her, Peter writes a fictitious article about Marilyn, whom he calls the "No" Girl, turning down Lord Granton's marriage proposal and deciding to hold out for true love instead. The story causes an immediate scandal and generates sympathy for Marilyn who becomes an overnight celebrity. Meanwhile, on the ship, the Grantons are informed of the scandal and that Charles' fiancé has broken her engagement. Convinced that Marilyn is attempting to blackmail him, Charles sends her a telegram asking how much money she wants in return for her silence.

That night while comforting Marilyn over drinks at the Gingham Café, Peter decides to capitalize on the publicity and her newfound celebrity. He works out a deal with the owner who gives Marilyn a job as a singer and dancer at the café—even though she cannot sing or dance. After a few singing and dancing lessons and a massive promotional campaign, Marilyn opens to a packed house. Despite her lack of talent, her self-effacing manner wins laughs from the audience who are completely won over by her innocence and charm. Through Peter's clever management and publicity stunts, the "No" Girl becomes a household name and a nightclub star, with her image appearing on billboards, posters, and front-page newspaper articles across the country.

Despite her fame and popularity, Marilyn is unable to forget her feelings for Charles. Needing to know how he really feels about her, Marilyn travels to London to perform her nightclub act. During one performance, she sees Charles in the audience; after sharing a romantic dance together, they agree to renew their relationship. A brokenhearted Peter graciously bows out of her life and returns to America so she can be happy. Later he sends her a box of popcorn as a reminder of their friendship.

Meanwhile, life with Charles is not as perfect as Marilyn had envisioned. Having spent months reading about The No Girl in the papers, he's more interested in her celebrity than in their love—unlike Peter, Charles never got to fully know the real Marilyn, who is now hopelessly obscured by the fake one. Charles invites her to go away with him to the country for a week—implying she might become his mistress, or at least the press would assume as much, which is precisely what he wants. She invites some American reporters to her flat, announces that she's "going home to sit on a bench and eat popcorn", and Charles is now stuck with a second public jilting, real this time, which he accepts ruefully.

Back in New York on a snowy Thursday night, Marilyn rushes through crowds of her admirers and makes her way to the library bench. Peter, having forgotten his wallet in his haste, gets roughed up by both his cab driver and a popcorn vendor—but still arrives with his popcorn, and they pick up right where they left off, happily observing the world around them—only this time punctuated with a kiss.

== Cast ==
- Claudette Colbert as Marilyn David
- Fred MacMurray as Peter Dawes
- Ray Milland as Charles Gray Granton (Note: The name is listed as "Granville" in the end credits, but "Granton" is the name used throughout the film in dialogue and newspaper stories.)
- C. Aubrey Smith as Lloyd Granton, Duke of Loamshire
- Luis Alberni as Nate
- Edward Craven as Eddie, the photographer
- Donald Meek as Hankerson
- Claude King as Captain of the boat
- Charles Irwin as Oscar, the orchestra leader
- Forrester Harvey as proprietor of the English inn
- Edward Gargan as guard
- Charles C. Wilson as Managing Editor
- Grace Bradley as Daisy
- Pat Somerset as man in London club
- Tom Dugan as the bum
- Warren Hymer as taxi driver
- Eddie Borden as photographer

== Production ==
=== Casting ===
The Gilded Lily was the first of seven films in which Claudette Colbert and Fred MacMurray starred between 1935 and 1948.

=== Filming ===
The Gilded Lily was filmed from October 8 to December 4, 1934, at Paramount Studios and at Iverson Movie Ranch in Chatsworth, Los Angeles, California.

== Accolades ==
The Gilded Lily was ranked the fifth best English language film by the National Board of Review in 1935.

== Quotes ==
- Peter: "But popcorn—ah, popcorn was made for watching the world go by. Look. I stick my hand in the bag without taking my eyes off the street. I throw some popcorn in my craw. I chew...and I'm still looking. That's what I call class." Marilyn: "Sure. Peanut eaters don't know how to live."
- Marilyn: "Pete, you're a smart fellow. What do poor little working girls usually do next?" Peter: "Well, they usually drown themselves, one way or the other." Marilyn: "I'll take the other."
- Marilyn: "I'm just a freak!"

== See also ==
- National Recovery Administration (NRA), the logo displayed at start of film
