= Roger Clark (actor, born 1908) =

American actor (1908–1978)

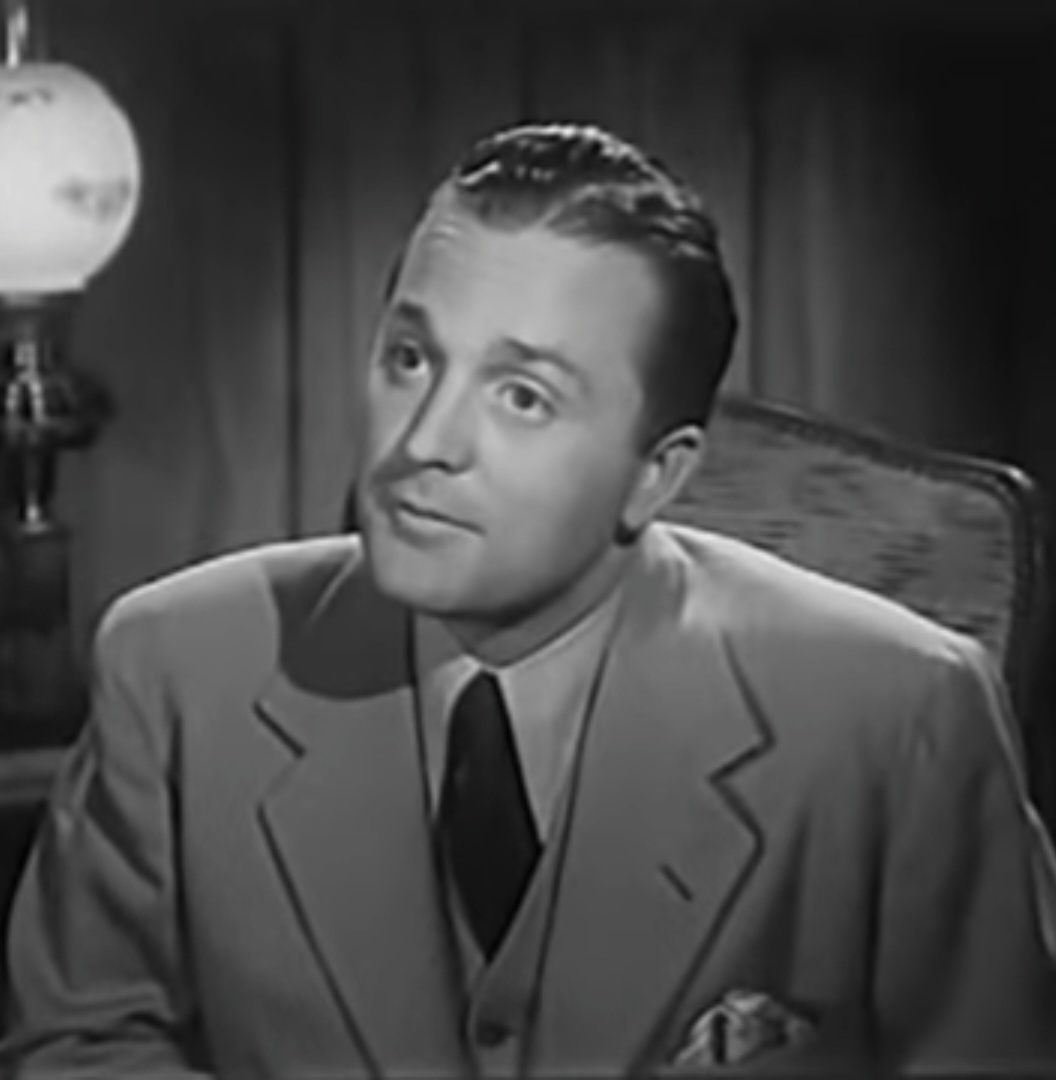
- Clark in Girls in Chains (1943)
- Born: Wister Somers Clark; March 16, 1908; Hartford, Connecticut, U.S.
- Died: October 13, 1978 (aged 70); Ojai, California, U.S.
- Other names: Roger W. Clark, Roger Wister Somers Clark, Wister Clark
- Education: Dartmouth College
- Occupations: Actor, model
- Years active: 1941–1962
- Spouse(s): Helen Grace Holt (1928-1932); Jan Wiley (1936-1945); Carolyn Louise Black (1950-1978; his death)
- Children: Roland Somers Clark

Roger Clark (born Wister Somers Clark; March 16, 1908 – October 13, 1978) was an American actor. He appeared in more than thirty films from 1941 to 1962.

== Early life and career ==
Born in Hartford, Connecticut, Clark was the son of Horace H. Clark and Jeannette Noble. He attended California Preparatory School and Dartmouth College.

In the fall of 1936, it was reported that Clark—described by The Charlotte Observer as "the handsome subject for nationally famous photographers", and by The Waco Times Herald as "the nation's leading male advertising model"—was one of many young performers being signed to long-term contracts by Universal Pictures.

Prior to making his official screen debut (Note: Clark reportedly made prior uncredited appearances in the 1937 feature film, Saturday's Heroes, and in numerous short subjects.) as "Van" Vandever in the 1941 film You Belong to Me, Clark had performed exclusively under his birth name, as Wister Clark. The stage name "Roger" was said to be the brainchild of that film's star, Barbara Stanwyck, as reported by AP's Hubbard Keavy. (Note: aka "Hub" Keavy, syndicated columnist who shortly thereafter became AP's Los Angeles Bureau chief.)

Wister Clark, from the New York stage, on his first day in the movies had to kiss Barbara Stanwyck 26 times. When it was over, she said: 'You say your name's Wister? That doesn't fit anybody who can kiss like that.' Whereupon Barbara decided Roger Clark would be better. The studio agreed, renamed him. Clark, bewildered, agreed. But he still can't understand what difference kissing makes in his name. Stanwyck didn't have any reason for considering the name Wister inadequate. But he is Roger Clark from now on.

Between 1944 and 1952, Clark produced, directed and/or performed in six Broadway shows.

== Personal life and death ==
Clark was married at least three times. In 1928, he married fellow Hartford native Helen Grace Holt and was divorced four years later on grounds of cruelty. They had one child together, a son, Roland Somers Clark. From July 30, 1936 until their divorce on July 19, 1945, Clark was married to actress Jan Wiley, and on March 6, 1950, he married Carolyn Louise Black.

On October 13, 1978, following a long illness, Clark died in Ojai, California, survived by his wife Louise, his son Roland, two grandchildren, and three great grandchildren.

== Selected filmography ==
Year	Title	Role	Notes
1941	You Belong to Me	Frederick Vandemer	
1941	Honolulu Lu		
1941	Secrets of the Lone Wolf	Paul Benoit	
1942	Daring Young Man	Ted Johnson	
1942	The Lady Is Willing	Victor	
1942	Meet the Stewarts	Ted Graham	
1942	Two Yanks in Trinidad	James W. Buckingham III	
1943	Girls in Chains	Frank Donavan	
1944	Pin Up Girl	Sgt. George Davis	
1944	Faces in the Fog	Sgt. O'Donnell	
