= Lee Bowman =

American actor (1914–1979)

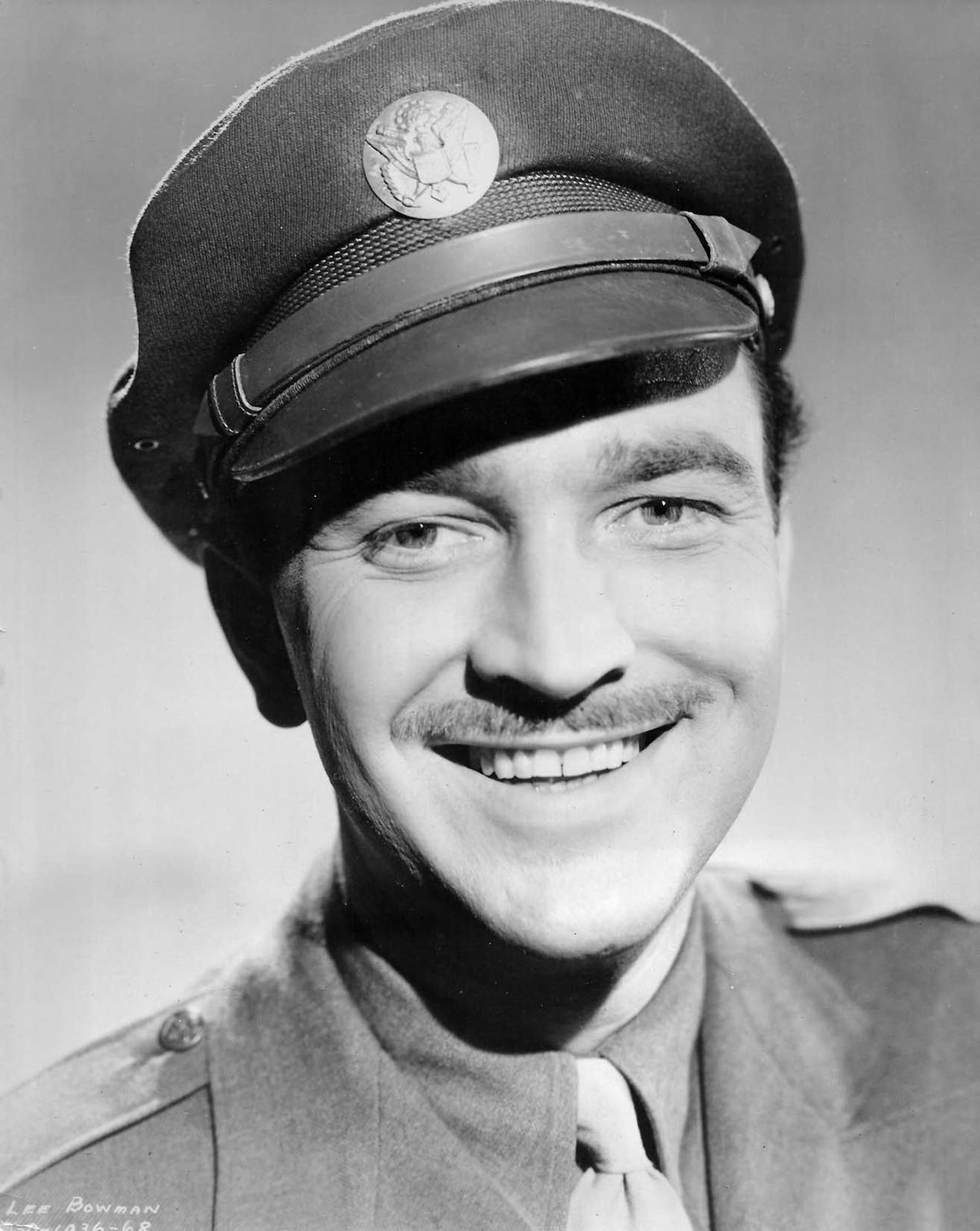
- Bowman as Andy Anderson in The Impatient Years (1944)
- Born: December 28, 1914; Cincinnati, Ohio, U.S.
- Died: December 25, 1979 (aged 64); Brentwood, Los Angeles, U.S.
- Occupation: Actor
- Years active: 1937–1968
- Spouse(s): Helene Rosson Bowman (m. 19??; his death 1979)
- Children: 2

Lee Bowman (December 28, 1914 – December 25, 1979) was an American film and television actor. According to one obituary, "his roles ranged from romantic lead to worldly, wisecracking lout in his most famous years".

== Career ==
Born in Cincinnati, Bowman dropped out of the University of Cincinnati Law School to study at the American Academy of Dramatic Arts. He was spotted by a Paramount Pictures agent and went to Hollywood in 1934, but was not used at first. Instead he worked as a radio singer and appeared in stock plays including The Old Lady Shows His Medals.

Bowman eventually made his film debut in I Met Him in Paris (1937) for Paramount. He worked at that studio for a while, then RKO, before moving to MGM where he appeared in Bataan (1943) a film that follows the fates of a group of men charged with destroying a bridge during the doomed defense of the Bataan Peninsula by American forces in the Philippines against the invading Japanese.

The lack of leading men in World War II was a boost to Bowman's career and he co-starred with Rita Hayworth in Cover Girl and Jean Arthur in The Impatient Years. According to a film writer at the time, "his Hollywood career has not been spectacular but has gained him a large following." He was signed by Columbia Pictures.

The Impatient Years was a hit and Bowman was described in late 1944 as "now a very hot commodity in Hollywood." However, he never quite progressed beyond supporting female stars and his status as a leading man faded.

Bowman was a much in-demand radio actor, and also worked on Broadway. He was the original actor who played Lucille Ball's husband in the audition program serving as a pilot for My Favorite Husband, airing on CBS Radio July 5, 1948; however, he was not available for the full series after CBS approved it, so when it debuted later that month it starred Ball and Richard Denning as the leads. This series would later go on to spawn I Love Lucy for television in 1950, with Ball's real-life husband Desi Arnaz replacing Denning at Ball's insistence.

After making his TV debut in The Silver Theatre in 1950, he appeared regularly on television including several guest appearances in the television series Robert Montgomery Presents and Playhouse 90. On November 16, 1950, he starred in "Suppressed Desires" on The Nash Airflyte Theater.

In the early 1950s, he became television's second Ellery Queen, stepping into the role after the first, Richard Hart, died unexpectedly of a coronary. Bowman hosted the short-lived game show What's Going On? on ABC in late 1954.

In 1961, he co-starred with Rocky Graziano in the private-eye series Miami Undercover, the first television series made in its entirety before being sold to a network. Bowman also guest-starred in The Fugitive.

== Media career ==
In his later career, Bowman was a pioneer in developing media training for the Republican leadership in Washington. In 1969 he was hired by the Nixon administration to help freshman representatives and politicians from marginal districts with their delivery, content and staging. (The job was described as being similar to Robert Montgomery's work with Dwight Eisenhower.) He also served as Master of Ceremonies for the 1968 and 1972 conventions.

From 1974 until his death, he was Chairman of the Kingstree Group, an international consulting firm, which offers communication advice to business and political leaders all over the world. Kingstree's global headquarters is now located in London, England. Bowman was responsible for developing the 'conversational' approach to spoken communication, which is recognized today as the only successful model for business and political presentations and media interviews.

For fifteen years Bowman was communications consultant for Bethlehem Steel.

== Death ==
He died from a heart attack in Brentwood, Los Angeles, on Christmas Day 1979, three days before his 65th birthday.

Bowman was married to Helene Rosson, Victor Fleming's step daughter. Their son, also called Lee Bowman, continued with the Kingstree Group. Bowman also had a stepdaughter from an early marriage by Rosson.

== Selected filmography ==
- Clarence (1937) – Man in Cafe (uncredited)
- Swing High, Swing Low (1937) – El Greco Patron (uncredited)
- Internes Can't Take Money (1937) – Interne Weeks
- I Met Him in Paris (1937) – Berk Sutter
- The Last Train from Madrid (1937) – Michael Balk
- Easy Living (1937) – Motorcycle Policeman (uncredited)
- Sophie Lang Goes West (1937) – Eddie Rollyn
- This Way Please (1937) – Stu Randall
- The First Hundred Years (1938) – George Wallace
- Having a Wonderful Time (1938) – Buzzy Armbruster
- A Man to Remember (1938) – Dick Abbott
- Tarnished Angel (1938) – Paul Montgommery
- Next Time I Marry (1938) – Count Georgi
- Love Affair (1939) – Kenneth Bradley
- Society Lawyer (1939) – Phil Siddall
- The Lady and the Mob (1939) – Fred Leonard
- Stronger Than Desire (1939) – Michael McLain
- Miracles for Sale (1939) – La Claire
- Dancing Co-Ed (1939) – Freddy Tobin
- Fast and Furious (1939) – Mike Stevens
- The Great Victor Herbert (1939) – Dr. Richard Moore
- Florian (1940) – Archduke Oliver
- Gold Rush Maisie (1940) – Bill Anders
- Wyoming (1940) – Sergeant Connelly
- Third Finger, Left Hand (1940) – Philip Booth
- Buck Privates (1941) – Randolph Parker III
- Model Wife (1941) – Ralph Benson
- Washington Melodrama (1941) – Ronnie Colton
- Married Bachelor (1941) – Eric Santley
- Design for Scandal (1941) – Walter Caldwell
- Kid Glove Killer (1942) – Gerald Ladimer
- We Were Dancing (1942) – Hubert Tyler
- Pacific Rendezvous (1942) – Lt. Bill Gordon
- Tish (1942) – Charles 'Charlie' Sands – Tish's Nephew
- Three Hearts for Julia (1943) – David Torrance
- Bataan (1943) – Capt. Henry Lassiter
- Cover Girl (1944) – Noel Wheaton
- Up in Mabel's Room (1944) – Arthur Weldon
- The Impatient Years (1944) – Andy Anderson
- Tonight and Every Night (1945) – Squadron Leader Paul Lundy
- She Wouldn't Say Yes (1945) – Michael Kent
- The Walls Came Tumbling Down (1946) – Gilbert Archer
- Smash-Up, the Story of a Woman (1947) – Ken Conway
- My Dream is Yours (1949) – Gary Mitchell
- There's a Girl in My Heart (1949) – Terrence Dowd
- House by the River (1950) – John Byrne
- Youngblood Hawke (1964) – Jason Prince

== Select theatre credits ==
- The Magic and the Loss

== Radio appearances ==
Year	Program	Episode/source
1952	Suspense	"I Won't Take a Minute"
1952	Cavalcade of America	A Thousand to One
1953	Cavalcade of America	The Secret Road
