= Sing You Sinners (film) =

1938 film by Claude Binyon, Wesley Ruggles

- Theatrical release poster
- Directed by: Wesley Ruggles
- Written by: Claude Binyon
- Produced by: Wesley Ruggles
- Starring: Bing Crosby; Fred MacMurray; Ellen Drew; Donald O'Connor
- Cinematography: Karl Struss
- Edited by: Alma Macrorie
- Music by: Boris Morros
- Production company: Paramount Pictures
- Distributed by: Paramount Pictures
- Release date: September 2, 1938 (USA)
- Running time: 88 minutes
- Country: United States
- Language: English

Sing You Sinners is a 1938 American musical comedy film directed by Wesley Ruggles and starring Bing Crosby, Fred MacMurray, Ellen Drew, and Donald O'Connor. Written by Claude Binyon, the film is about three singing brothers who go to California to find their fortune. Initially the film was to be titled "The Unholy Beebes" and then "Harmony for Three" before finishing with "Sing You Sinners". Filming took place in April/May 1938 in Hollywood. Race track scenes were filmed at the Pomona Fairgrounds and at Santa Anita using two dozen of Crosby's horses. Sing You Sinners was premiered on August 5, 1938, at the Del Mar racetrack with the New York premiere taking place on August 16.

The film introduced the two Crosby hit songs "Small Fry" and "I've Got a Pocketful of Dreams". Crosby recorded the former title as a duet with Johnny Mercer for Decca Records. However, it does not include the song Sing You Sinners.

== Plot ==
The three Beebe brothers are talented singers looking to make their way in the world. Joe Beebe is a chronic gambler and a source of great consternation for his loving mother, who only wishes he would follow the example of his responsible brother David, who postpones his marriage to Martha Randall regularly because Joe cannot support the family. Mike Beebe, the youngest of the three brothers, idolizes his gambler brother and wants to grow up to be just like him. While Joe is always looking for an angle, convinced his only road to success is through gambling, David prefers working in his garage and dreams of the day he can afford to marry Martha.

After losing his new job at the local gas station for trading gas for rummage articles, Joe travels to Los Angeles and soon wins money at the racetrack. Using the money to purchase a swap shop, Joe then trades the store for a racehorse named Uncle Gus. After Joe sends back home glowing reports of his success, Mother Beebe and Mike travel out to California and stay with him. Later, David and Martha also travel to Los Angeles and are shocked to see the rest of their family living on the brink of poverty because of Joe's laziness. Forced once again to postpone his wedding, David sends Martha back home.

With no money coming in, Mother Beebe forces her sons to use their musical training and go to work as a singing trio at a nightclub. Meanwhile, young Mike has been chosen to ride in a big race as Uncle Gus' jockey. One of their competitors, Harry Ringmer (John Gallaudet), bribes the thirteen-year-old into losing the race. Later, when Mike reveals the arrangement to Joe, the older brother reassures him and advises him to race to win. After Mike and Uncle Gus win the race, Ringmer and one of his thugs confront Mike and Joe and beat them up. David and Mother Beebe come to their rescue, and the fight continues until Ringmer and his thug give up.

With enough money to pay their debts, David tries to quit the singing group, but his mother insists that they all keep their steady singing jobs, and her sons agree. David sends Martha a telegram asking her to come back to "marry the four of them", and the three Beebe brothers continue their singing career.

== Cast ==
- Bing Crosby as Joe Beebe
- Fred MacMurray as David Beebe
- Ellen Drew as Martha Randall
- Donald O'Connor as Mike Beebe
- Elizabeth Patterson as Mother Beebe
- John Gallaudet as Harry Ringmer
- William Haade as Pete
- Paul White as Filter, Stable Boy
- Irving Bacon as lecturer on Seals
- Tom Dugan as Race Fan
- Herbert Corthell as Nightclub Manager
- Harry Barris as Band leader

== Reception ==
Bosley Crowther writing in The New York Times liked it. "The happily accidental conjunction of Bing Crosby and horse racing (which is Bing's other love, besides crooning, as you may have read somewhere) has turned out to be the funniest comedy on Broadway, including all the side streets. The only noteworthy difference between reality and Sing You Sinners at the Paramount, is that in the movies Crosby's horse wins—an unprecedented thing which may be explained by the fact that Bing undoubtedly must have had a hand in the script....Claude Binyon's story and Wesley Ruggles’ direction are swell, and the two principal songs, “I’ve Got a Pocketful of Dreams” and “Don't Let That Moon Get Away” are already being whistled about town. Incidentally, that's another thing we like about Sing You Sinners: not too much singing."

Variety was in favor of it too. "A new and interesting Bing Crosby emerges in Sing You Sinners, a likeable ne’er-do-well who believes that the secret of success lies in taking gambles. He is less the crooner, and, for added relief of tiring Crosby fans, if any, less of a delight for fluttering maidenly hearts. Instead, he's something of a pain in the neck to a forgiving mother and two brothers. Crosby and a small but good cast combine with an excellent story and good direction for surefire box office. . . . Being less the crooner in this effort than previously, Crosby does only one number solo, though there are four in the footage. Othere are molded for the trio...Crosby plays his part strongly but with restraint. He doesn't hog anything from MacMurray nor moppet O’Connor."

== Soundtrack ==
- "Sing, You Sinners" (W. Franke Harling, Sam Coslow) during the opening credits
- "Shall We Gather at the River?" (Traditional) by the cast
- "Don't Let That Moon Get Away" (James V. Monaco, Johnny Burke) by Bing Crosby
- "I've Got a Pocketful of Dreams" (James V. Monaco, Johnny Burke) by Bing Crosby, Fred MacMurray, and Donald O'Connor
- "Laugh and Call It Love" (James V. Monaco, Johnny Burke) by Bing Crosby, Fred MacMurray, and Donald O'Connor
- "Small Fry" (Hoagy Carmichael, Frank Loesser) by Bing Crosby, Fred MacMurray, and Donald O'Connor

Another song by Monaco and Burke - "Where Is Central Park?" was written for the film but not used.

Bing Crosby recorded four of the songs for Decca Records. "I've Got a Pocketful of Dreams" was top of the charts for four weeks and "Small Fry" reached the No. 3 position during a 13-week stay. Crosby's songs were also included in the Bing's Hollywood series.
