= The Impatient Years =

1944 film by Irving Cummings

- Directed by: Irving Cummings
- Written by: Virginia Van Upp
- Produced by: Irving Cummings; Virginia Van Upp (associate producer)
- Starring: Jean Arthur; Lee Bowman; Charles Coburn; Edgar Buchanan; Charley Grapewin
- Cinematography: Joseph Walker
- Edited by: Al Clark
- Music by: Marlin Skiles; M. W. Stoloff
- Distributed by: Columbia Pictures
- Release date: September 14, 1944
- Running time: 91 min.
- Country: U.S.
- Language: English
- Budget: $600,000 (estimated)

The Impatient Years is a 1944 romance film made by Columbia Pictures, directed by Irving Cummings, and written by Virginia Van Upp.

This was the final film Jean Arthur owed Columbia as part of her long contract which included periods of fights with studio boss Harry Cohn and resulted in a number of suspensions. Arthur was known to be thrilled her contract was over.

== Plot ==
Andy (Lee Bowman) and Janie (Jean Arthur) Anderson are seated on opposite sides of a court room filing for a divorce. As the judge is about to render his verdict, Janie's father (Charles Coburn) makes a suggestion. In an attempt to save the marriage, William suggests that the couple return to San Francisco (where they met a year and a half ago) for four days and retrace all of their steps to include getting married.

== Cast ==
- Jean Arthur as Janie Anderson
- Lee Bowman as Andy Anderson
- Charles Coburn as William Smith
- Edgar Buchanan as Judge
- Charley Grapewin as Benjamin L. Pidgeon, Bellboy
- Phil Brown as Henry Fairchild
- Harry Davenport as Minister
- Jane Darwell as Minister's Wife
- Grant Mitchell as Hotel Clerk
- Bob Haymes as Singer

== Home media ==
The film is available on DVD as part of the Jean Arthur Comedy Collection, released by Sony Pictures Home Entertainment.
