= Bolero (1934 film) =

1934 film by Wesley Ruggles

- Theatrical release poster
- Directed by: Wesley Ruggles
- Written by: Horace Jackson
- Based on: story by Carey Wilson & Kubec Glasmon
- Starring: George Raft; Carole Lombard; Sally Rand; Ray Milland; William Frawley
- Cinematography: Leo Tover
- Edited by: Hugh Bennett
- Music by: Ralph Rainger; Maurice Ravel
- Production company: Paramount Pictures
- Distributed by: Paramount Pictures
- Release date: February 23, 1934
- Running time: 85 minutes
- Country: United States
- Language: English

Bolero is a 1934 American pre-Code musical drama film directed by Wesley Ruggles and starring George Raft and Carole Lombard. The Paramount production was a rare chance for Raft to play a dancer, which had been his profession in New York City, rather than portraying a gangster. The film takes its title from the Maurice Ravel composition Boléro (1928). The supporting cast includes William Frawley, Ray Milland and Sally Rand.

== Plot ==
In 1910 New York, Raoul De Baere is a coal miner who wants to be a dancer and tries to persuade his brother Mike to manage him. He dreams of moving to Europe and opening a nightclub in Paris. He does not fare well until he teams with a female partner, Lucy, and they make a success dancing at a beer garden in New Jersey. Lucy is attracted to Raoul but he does not want to mix business with pleasure.

Raoul travels to Paris, where he makes a living dancing with elderly women in nightclubs. He finds a dance partner, Leona, and they dance as a team in nightclubs. Leona wants to start a romance with Raoul, but he refuses. When Leona threatens to quit, Mike begins a romantic relationship with her, although he dislikes her jealousy and wage demands.

Former Ziegfeld chorus girl Helen Hathaway convinces Raoul to team with her. He quits his Paris job to go to England with Helen, dumping Leona. Raoul is attracted to Helen but makes her promise that she will always reject his advances. She agrees and they make a successful dance team. They appear on the bill with fan dancer Annette, who wants to team with Raoul and tells him that Lord Coray is romantically interested in Helen. While holidaying in Belgium, Raoul and Helen start an affair.

Raoul opens a nightclub in Paris and he devises a very athletic routine with Helen to be accompanied by Ravel's Boléro. However, news of the outbreak of World War I distracts the audience during the debut. Raoul stops the performance and delivers a patriotic speech, promising to not dance until the war ends. When Helen learns that Raoul's speech was merely for publicity, she leaves him to work as a nurse and marry Coray.

Raoul and Mike serve in the army during the war and Raoul is wounded. On Armistice Day, a doctor warns him that if he ever exerts himself again, he may die. After the war, Raoul tries to find Helen and restart his dancing career. He cannot find her, but he reconnects with Annette and they again form a team.

Raoul reopens his Paris nightclub featuring the famous Boléro dance performance. On opening night, as he is about to start the show, he finds Annette drunk and unable to perform. However, Helen is in the audience and agrees to take Annette's place, and Raoul hopes that she will rejoin him. They dance to thunderous applause, although the routine causes Raoul serious physical stress. Before they can return to the stage for an encore performance, Raoul collapses and dies.

== Cast ==
- George Raft as Raoul De Baere
- Carole Lombard as Helen Hathaway
- Sally Rand as Annette
- Ray Milland as Lord Robert Coray
- Frances Drake as Leona
- William Frawley as Mike DeBaere (Raoul's brother)
- Gertrude Michael as Lady D'Argon
- Gloria Shea as Lucy

== Production ==
The film was based on the life of the American dancer Maurice Mouvet, known professionally as Maurice (1889–1927). Maurice was born in New York and moved to Europe at a young age, where he became famous for his dancing. He was romantically involved with several of his dancing partners; other partners left him to get married. Maurice died relatively young of tuberculosis.

George Raft, whose character was based on Maurice, said he knew Maurice and taught him some dance steps. He refused to appear in the film until some changes to the script were made, but Paramount suspended him, only to later relent and implement the changes. Before filming, Raft said: "If they [the public] don't go for me in this one, I might as well quit." Raft reportedly punched the film's producer Benjamin Glazer during filming, although Glazer later claimed that it was just a push. Raft later classified the incident as the most regrettable of his fights as a dancer.

Miriam Hopkins was intended to play the female lead but fell ill while making Design for Living. She was replaced by Carole Lombard, although Lombard had never danced professionally. Paramount was impressed with the performance of Ray Milland, who had been away from Hollywood for a while, and later offered him a long-term contract.

The film's title and music are based on Maurice Ravel's Boléro, but the composition was not written until 1928 and the scenes take place in 1914.

The Hays Office disapproved of real-life burlesque dancer Sally Rand appearing in films, but Paramount paid her $1,200 per week for four weeks. The film was released before rigorous enforcement of the Hollywood Production Code came into effect on July 1, 1934. Several scenes would likely have been banned by the code, such as those in which Helen auditions in her underwear and Sally Rand performs her famous fan dance. A double was used for Lombard in many of the shots in the dance scenes.

LeRoy Prinz was the choreographer and devised a new tango for the film called "Raftero." Ballroom dancers Veloz and Yolanda were hired as uncredited dance doubles and choreographers.

Filming started in December 1933 and finished by January 1934.

In 1959, Raft announced that he wanted to remake the film, but no project materialized.

== Reception ==
In a contemporary review for The New York Times, critic Andre Sennwald wrote: "Mr. Raft is a vivid and pictorially interesting type, rather than an actor in the technical sense, and consequently he proves unequal to the full implications of the fame-hungry dancer. The exterior attractiveness which Mr. Raft brings to the role gives "Bolero" considerable color, nevertheless, and the film, without coming close to realizing the real possibilities of the story as an overpowering study of megalomania, does manage to be moderately entertaining."

The Los Angeles Times critic Philip K. Scheuer wrote: "[T]he waits between dances are so interminable, the characters so obtuse and self-centered, that the film emerges largely as a series of anticlimaxes. ... [A]s drama, the piece remains essentially makeshift and sporadic."

The film was a box-office hit, and its success led to another pairing of Raft and Lombard in a film with a fairly similar plot and title, Rumba (1935). However, the second film was much less successful.

== Influence ==
The dance routine was copied by Jayne Torvill and Christopher Dean for their famous ice-dance routine to the same music.

Sally Rand's bubble dance was spoofed in Tex Avery's cartoon Hollywood Steps Out (1941).
