= Two Yanks in Trinidad =

1942 film by Gregory Ratoff

- Theatrical release poster
- Directed by: Gregory Ratoff
- Written by: Sy Bartlett; Richard Carroll; Jack Henley; Harry Segall
- Produced by: Samuel Bischoff
- Starring: Pat O'Brien; Brian Donlevy; Janet Blair; Roger Clark
- Cinematography: Philip Tannura
- Edited by: Viola Lawrence
- Music by: John Leipold
- Production company: Columbia Pictures
- Distributed by: Columbia Pictures
- Release date: March 26, 1942
- Running time: 84 minutes
- Country: United States
- Language: English

Two Yanks in Trinidad is a 1942 American comedy spy film directed by Gregory Ratoff and starring Pat O'Brien, Brian Donlevy and Janet Blair.

The film was in production when Pearl Harbor was attacked by the Japanese, leading to America's entry into World War II.

== Plot ==
Two gangsters have a fight over a woman, and separately decided to join the US Army. While stationed in Trinidad they join forces to thwart a plan by Nazi agents to smuggle oil out of the island.

== Cast ==
- Pat O'Brien as Tim Reardon
- Brian Donlevy as Vince Barrows
- Janet Blair as Patricia Dare
- Roger Clark as James W. Buckingham III
- Donald MacBride as Sgt. Valentine
- John Emery as Chicago Hagen
- Frank Jenks as Joe Scavenger
- Frank Sully as Mike Paradise
- Veda Ann Borg as Bubbles
- Clyde Fillmore as Col. Powers
- Dick Curtis as Sea Captain
- Sig Arno as Maitre d'
- Emory Parnell as Police Chief

== Bibliography ==
- Koszarski, Richard. Hollywood on the Hudson: Film and Television in New York from Griffith to Sarnoff. Rutgers University Press, 2008.
- Langman, Larry. Destination Hollywood: The Influence of Europeans on American Filmmaking. McFarland, 2000.
