= Fred MacMurray =

American actor (1908–1991)

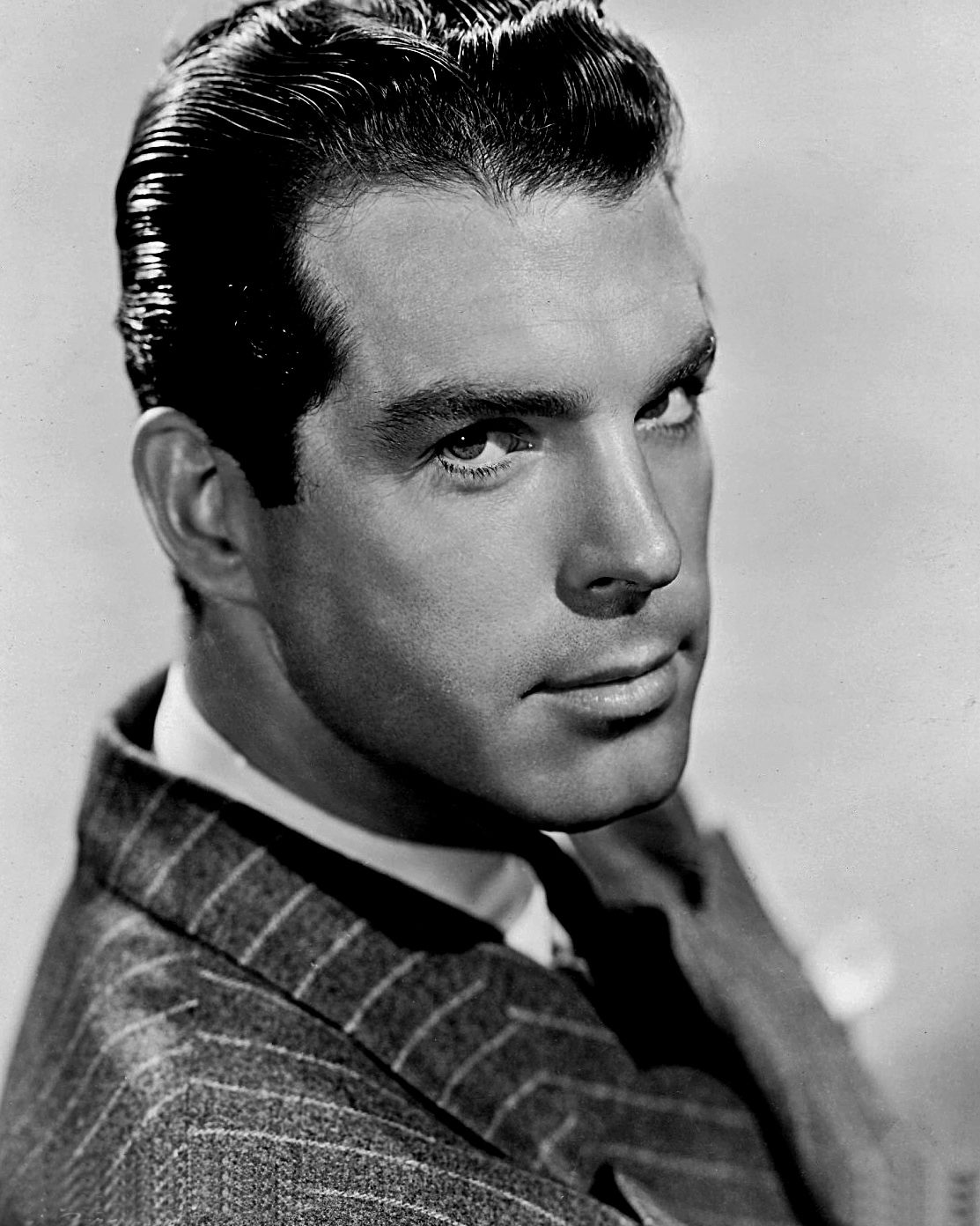
- MacMurray in the 1930s
- Born: Frederick Martin MacMurray; August 30, 1908; Kankakee, Illinois, U.S.
- Died: November 5, 1991 (aged 83); Santa Monica, California, U.S.
- Resting place: Holy Cross Cemetery, Culver City
- Occupation: Actor
- Years active: 1929–1978
- Political party: Republican
- Spouses: Lillian Lamont (m. 1936; died 1953) June Haver (m. 1954)
- Children: 4
- Relatives: Fay Holderness (aunt)

Frederick Martin MacMurray (August 30, 1908 – November 5, 1991) was an American actor. He appeared in more than one hundred films and a successful television series in a career that spanned nearly a half-century. His career as a major film leading man began in 1935, but his most renowned role was in Billy Wilder's 1944 film noir Double Indemnity. From 1959 to 1973, MacMurray appeared in numerous Disney films, including The Shaggy Dog, The Absent-Minded Professor, Follow Me, Boys!, and The Happiest Millionaire. He starred as Steve Douglas in the television series My Three Sons.

== Early life and education ==
Frederick Martin MacMurray was born on August 30, 1908, in Kankakee, Illinois, the son of Maleta (née Martin) and concert violinist Frederick Talmadge MacMurray, both natives of Wisconsin. His aunt, Fay Holderness, was a vaudeville performer and actress. When MacMurray was an infant, his family moved to Madison, Wisconsin, where his father taught music. They relocated within the state to Beaver Dam, his mother's birthplace.

MacMurray attended school in Quincy, Illinois, where he played football and baseball, ran on the track team and worked in a local pea cannery. After graduation, he received a full scholarship to Carroll College in Waukesha, Wisconsin. He played the saxophone in numerous local bands, having picked up the instrument when he was looking to fill his spare time. He continued to play saxophone while attending the Chicago Art Institute in the evenings.

== Career ==
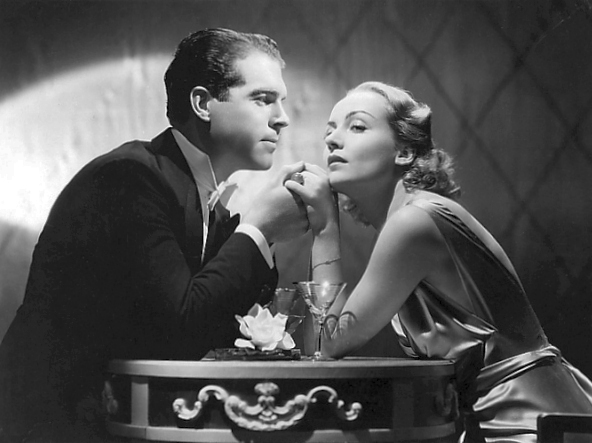
MacMurray with Carole Lombard in Hands Across the Table (1935)

Musician MacMurray sang and played saxophone with two of the leading dance bands of the day. Firstly with the George Olsen orchestra from 1928 and then Gus Arnheim from 1930.

=== Acting ===
In 1928, MacMurray chauffeured his mother to Los Angeles for her health and to visit family. While there he found work as an extra and continued his saxophone playing, then with the California Collegians, a vaudeville group that was formed out of the pit orchestra at the Warner Brothers Hollywood Theatre. His extra work was earning him $10 a day. The band was hired to appear on Broadway in Three's a Crowd (1930–31) with Fred Allen, Clifton Webb and Libby Holman, resulting in a move to New York City from California. MacMurray was offered a role in the production, leading to a further casting in the musical Roberta alongside Sydney Greenstreet and Bob Hope (1933–34). MacMurray signed with Paramount Pictures in 1934.

=== Stardom ===
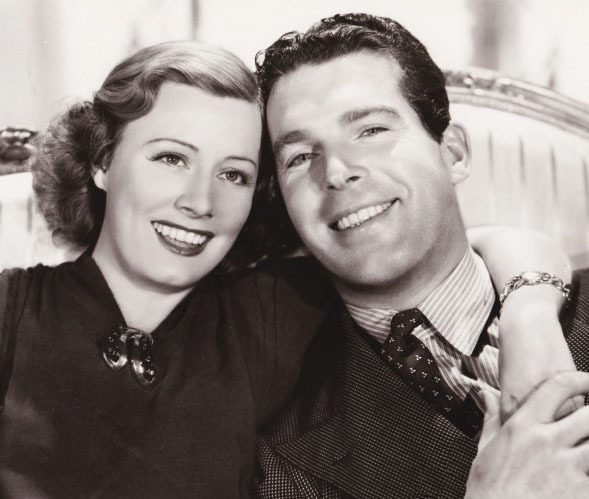
MacMurray with Irene Dunne in a promotional photo for Invitation to Happiness (1939)

In the 1930s, MacMurray worked with film directors Billy Wilder and Preston Sturges, and actors Barbara Stanwyck, Henry Fonda, Humphrey Bogart, Marlene Dietrich, and in seven films, Claudette Colbert, beginning with The Gilded Lily. He co-starred with Katharine Hepburn in Alice Adams, with Joan Crawford in Above Suspicion, and with Carole Lombard in four productions: Hands Across the Table, The Princess Comes Across, Swing High, Swing Low and True Confession. Usually cast in light comedies as a decent, thoughtful character (The Trail of the Lonesome Pine), and in melodramas and musicals, MacMurray became one of the film industry's highest-paid actors of the period. In 1943, his annual salary had reached $420,000, making him the highest-paid actor in Hollywood and the fourth-highest-paid person in the nation.

MacMurray did not serve in the military during the Second World War, instead working to sell war bonds and as an air-raid warden in his Brentwood neighborhood. The movies that he did produce during this period were mostly considered to be "morale-boosters" rather than outright "war pictures" that some of his contemporaries were churning out. In 1944, his earnings increased to $439,000, making him again the highest-paid actor.

During the production of the 1947 film The Egg and I, the hens appearing in the movie laid over 300 eggs. MacMurray and costar Claudette Colbert autographed one egg each in fifty cartons. The eggs were sold at a local farmers market and profits were donated to the Braille Institute of America.

Having starred in many episodes of Lux Radio Theatre in the late 1930s and 1940s, MacMurray returned to the medium in 1952. He featured in Bright Star, along with Irene Dunne, in which he portrayed a reporter for a local newspaper.

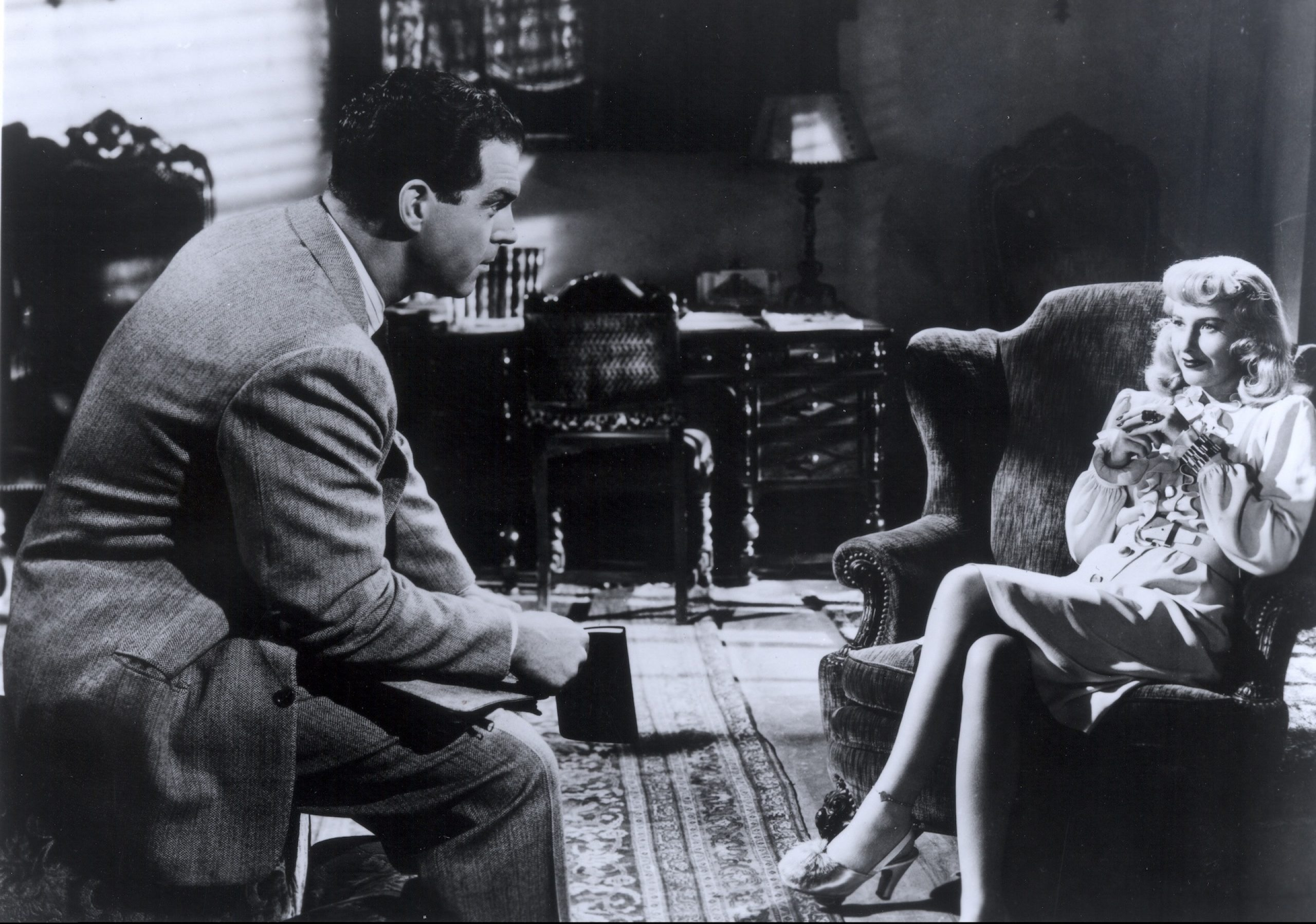
MacMurray with Barbara Stanwyck in Double Indemnity (1944)

Despite being typecast as a "nice guy", MacMurray often said his best roles were when he was cast against type, such as under the direction of Billy Wilder and Edward Dmytryk. Perhaps his best known "bad guy" performance was that of Walter Neff, an insurance salesman who plots with a greedy wife to kill her husband in the film noir classic Double Indemnity. MacMurray stated in 1956 that this was his favorite role, and that it "...proved I could do serious acting". In another turn in the "not so nice" category, MacMurray played the cynical, duplicitous Lieutenant Thomas Keefer in Dmytryk's film The Caine Mutiny. Six years later, MacMurray played Jeff Sheldrake, a two-timing corporate executive in Wilder's Oscar-winning film The Apartment. In 1958, he guest-starred in the premiere episode of NBC's Cimarron City Western series, with George Montgomery and John Smith. MacMurray's career continued upward the following year, when he was cast as the father in the Disney film The Shaggy Dog.

=== My Three Sons ===
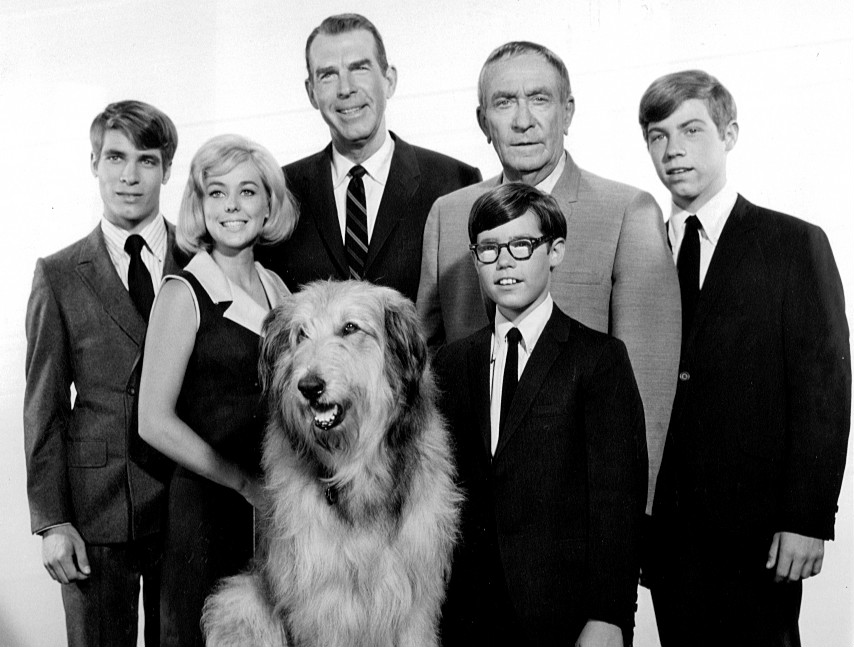
MacMurray (third from left) with the cast of My Three Sons in 1967

In an interview with Hedda Hopper in 1956, MacMurray noted that he had been asked to take on the role of Perry Mason on television. He turned it down, saying "I want to do as little TV work as possible – it's lots of work. I guess I am just lazy".

From 1960 to 1972, he starred in My Three Sons, a long-running, highly rated TV series. Concurrently with it, MacMurray starred in other films, playing Professor Ned Brainard in The Absent-Minded Professor and its sequel Son of Flubber. Using his star-power clout, MacMurray had a provision in his My Three Sons contract that all of his scenes on that series were to be shot in two separate month-long production blocks and filmed first. That condensed performance schedule provided him more free time to pursue his work in films, maintain his ranch in Northern California, and enjoy his favorite leisure activity, golf. Over the years, MacMurray became one of the wealthiest actors in the entertainment industry, primarily from wise real estate investments and from his "notorious frugality".

=== Retirement ===
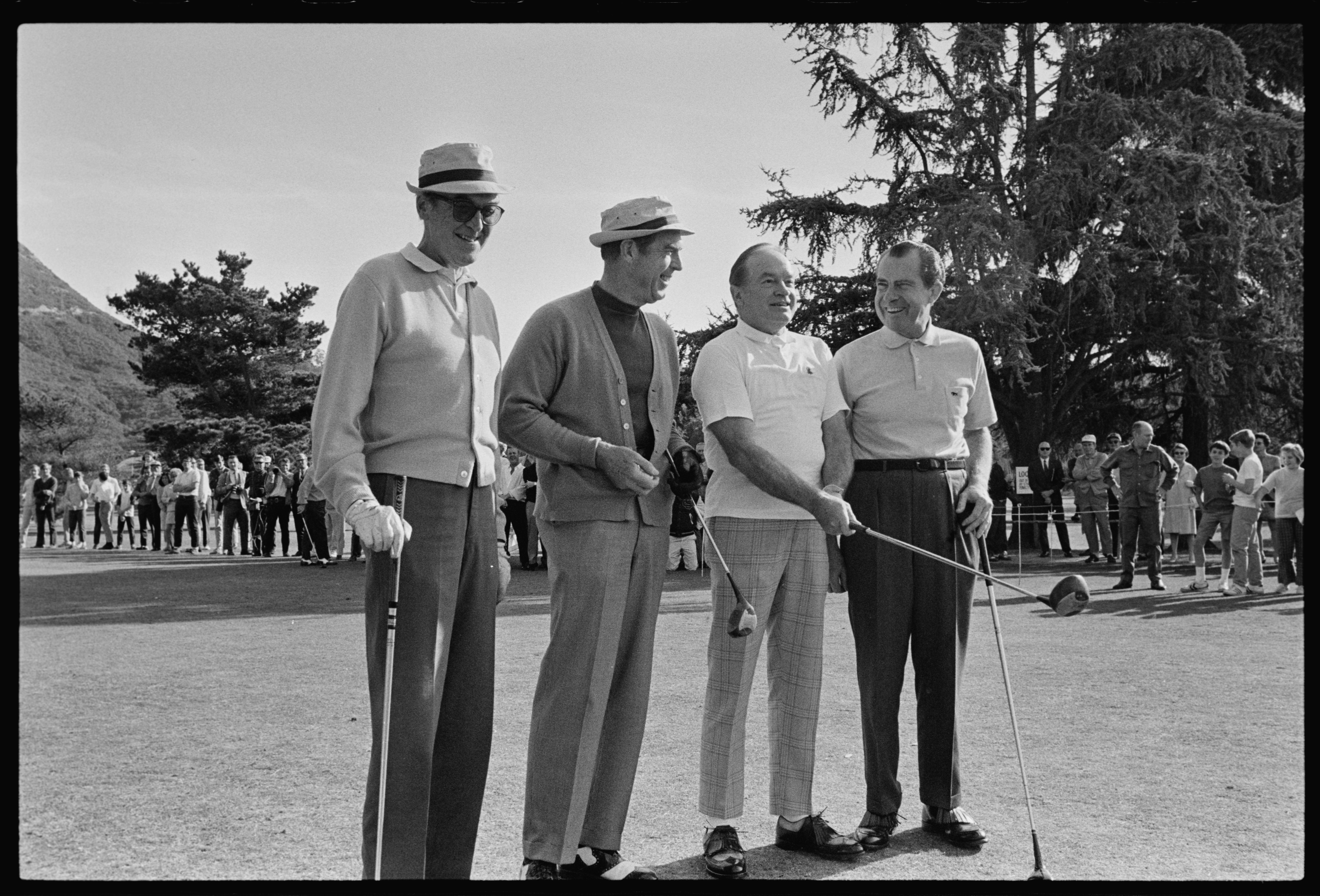
Left to right: James Stewart, MacMurray, Bob Hope and President Richard Nixon playing golf (1970)

In the early 1970s, MacMurray appeared in commercials for the Greyhound Lines bus company. In 1979, he appeared in a series of commercials for the Korean chisenbop math calculation program. MacMurray's final film was The Swarm, costarring Michael Caine, Olivia de Havilland and Henry Fonda. The actor, semi-retired at this point, was called back for one last film by director Irwin Allen entitled Fire!; however, his diagnosis of throat cancer caused him to pull out. Allen then offered him the small role (for a total of two days on set) of a pharmacist in The Swarm. MacMurray told reporters that he did not "...really miss it. A lot of actors go crazy if they aren't working, but I guess I'm a little lazy." He successfully underwent treatment for his cancer during the production.

=== Business ventures ===
MacMurray was also a prolific businessman, frequently earning over $400,000 a year in the 1940s. In 1941, he purchased land in the Russian River Valley in Northern California and established MacMurray Ranch. On the 1,750-acre (2.7 sq mi) ranch, he raised prize-winning Aberdeen Angus cattle, cultivated prunes, apples, alfalfa and other crops, and enjoyed watercolor painting, fly fishing, and skeet shooting. MacMurray wanted the property's agricultural heritage preserved, so five years after his death, in 1996, it was sold to Gallo, which planted vineyards on it for wines that bear the MacMurray Ranch label. One of MacMurray's children now lives on the property (in a cabin built by her father), and is "actively engaged in Sonoma's thriving wine community, carrying on her family's legacy and the heritage of MacMurray Ranch".

In 1944, he purchased the Bryson Apartment Hotel in the Westlake, Los Angeles neighborhood for $600,000, using profits from Double Indemnity, and was a co-owner of three other apartment buildings. The actor was cautious with his finances, which went hand-in-hand with his sedate lifestyle. The majority of his earnings were used for investments (including a knitting mill, co-owner of a golf-and-tennis club and a cold-storage business). MacMurray insisted upon a percentage of gross of the films in which he starred.

In 1945, along with former actor Leslie Fenton, MacMurray formed a production company, entitled "Mutual Pictures". With this production company the pair made one film, Pardon My Past, a moderate success.

A 1977 profile dispelled the myth of MacMurray's wealth, reporting that if he "...sold everything I'd be worth maybe $3 million to $4 million. Maybe". He stated that the myth of his wealth being in league with Doris Duke and the Aga Khan ($75 to $100 million range) stemmed from his life-long frugality.

== Personal life ==
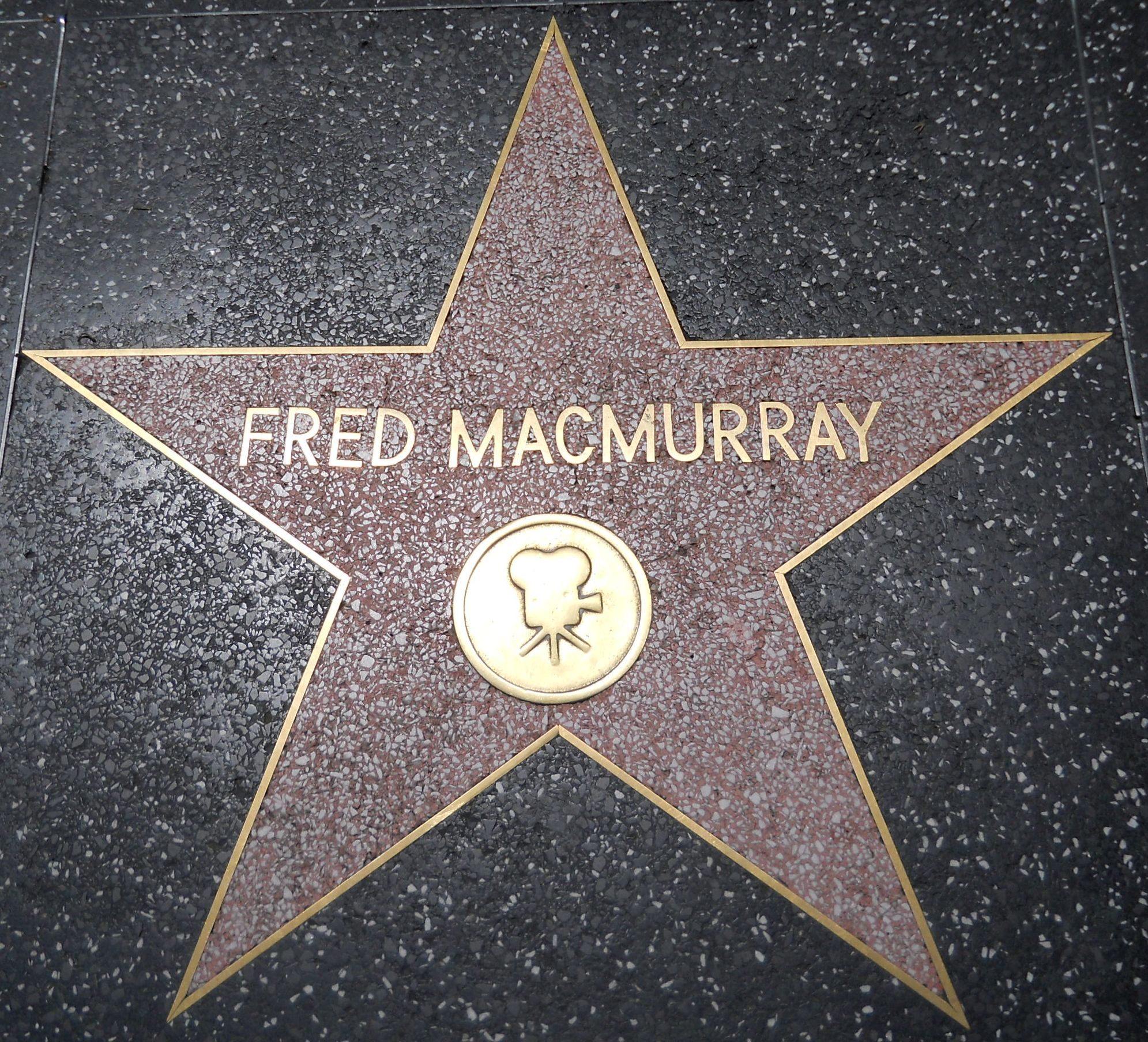
Star on the Hollywood Walk of Fame at 6421 Hollywood Boulevard

=== Family ===
MacMurray was married twice, first to Lillian "Lily" Lamont (legal name: Lilian Wehmhoener MacMurray, born 1908) and after her death, actress June Haver.

=== Lillian Lamont ===
Lamont and MacMurray met during the production of Roberta while in New York City while he was performing with the California Collegians in 1934, and they quickly became an item. Despite the budding romance he left New York and returned to Hollywood in efforts to continue his career.

It was reported that upon his return he spurned a matchmaking attempt by gossip columnist Louella Parsons. Accounts vary, with some reporting that Parsons was angry over MacMurray's refusal of her efforts, leading Parsons to attempt to derail his career. Other sources indicate that MacMurray turned down a party invitation from William Randolph Hearst (via Parsons), as the publisher had already identified another female as MacMurray's date for the event. Parsons refers in a 1947 column that she and MacMurray made amends, "...we let our hair down about a lot of things...principally a misunderstanding that marred a long friendship, and then and there cleaned up all our grievances", possibly alluding to the columnist's attempts at career sabotage.

In 1934, the couple announced the news that they were in a "test engagement", stating that they "want to be sure before we make any official announcement" that "...their personalities were the type which could pull in a double harness while they followed their careers". By late spring in 1936, the couple decided to make it official. Late on the night of June 19, 1936, MacMurray, Lamont and MacMurray's mother traveled by plane to Las Vegas to be married. The trip – and the marriage – were kept secret from friends and studio officials, who spent the day of the 20th trying to locate the actor. The newlyweds and family returned to Hollywood on a plane that same day.

In 1945, they moved into a 10-room, two-story Colonial house in Brentwood. Neighbors (and friends) included Jimmy Stewart and Henry Fonda. Joan Crawford described the couple as having "one of the few happy and well-adjusted marriages". While they were known to be homebodies and family-oriented, they were also social within the Hollywood community. They hosted parties, both large and small, for friends. They were close with Clark Gable and Carole Lombard, often having Sunday afternoon BBQs with each other. At the larger gatherings, Lombard proved to be the source of entertainment for the assembled guests with her antics and off-color language.

Lamont was often in poor health, including kidney and heart problems. This is reportedly why MacMurray and Lamont adopted two children. In 1940, their daughter Susan joined the family, with formal adoption completed in 1942. Four years later they adopted one-and-a-half year-old Robert. Later in his son's life, the father and son would drift apart, with MacMurray lamenting that Robert went "the hippie route via the South Seas to 'find himself'".

After struggling with physical health issues for most of her life, her condition deteriorated even further in the early 1950s. She eventually succumbed to kidney and heart issues in June 1953, shortly after the couple's 17th wedding anniversary. In a 2006 interview between a MacMurray biographer and Lamont's cousin, the family states that she suffered from bulimia. This may have stemmed from her days as a model and contributed to her other health issues.

=== June Haver ===
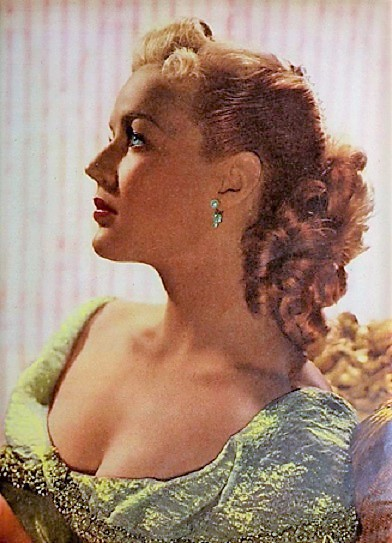
MacMurray's second wife, actress June Haver

MacMurray first met actress June Haver when they starred in Where Do We Go From Here in 1945, although they had little interaction. By the early 1950s, Haver was grieving the sudden death of her fiancé Dr. John Duzik in 1949. In part because of her grief, Haver had considered a life as a nun. A life-long devout Catholic, she met with Pope Pius XII in 1951 and decided to follow her faith and join a convent. She realized after eight months that the convent life was not for her. In 1953, at a "Gay Nineties" party thrown by pal John Wayne, Haver and MacMurray met socially. Both had been reluctant to attend the party; however, they left together and quickly became an item. After the socially acceptable amount of time grieving the death of Lamont, the couple decided to make their relationship official, deciding to marry in 1954. She was granted an annulment in the Catholic Church following her brief marriage to Jimmy Zito in 1947 before divorcing in 1948.

MacMurray purchased actor Red Skelton's good-luck pinky ring as an engagement ring, officially proposing to Haver after a trip to a drugstore. They publicly announced their wedding date for the first week of August 1954; however, they actually wed over a month early, on June 28, to the surprise of friends and the press. With the help of friend Ray Cardillo, a travel agency owner, the ceremony was held at the Ojai Valley Inn. They honeymooned in Jackson Hole, Wyoming, while MacMurray finished working on The Far Horizons.

MacMurray stated in a 1954 interview that "June had a serious operation after she fell at Fox Studios a couple of years ago...and she's not sure if she will be able to have children". As a result of Haver's inability to conceive, in 1956 they adopted fraternal twins, Laurie Ann and Katie Marie, "right out of the incubator".

Haver curtailed her Hollywood career after marrying MacMurray, with one final appearance on the Lucy-Desi Comedy Hour in 1958 as herself. She stated that she had no desire to act further, "I lost it all [desire]. I'm remaining a private citizen and will stay at home and work...it has been supplanted by something better. Now that I have four children in the family I have a lot to keep me busy". MacMurray did not believe that it was his place to keep Haver from acting, stating "...I'd hate to be the one to keep her off the screen...the decision is up to her. I'd rather have her at home, but if she wants to make a picture, it's okay with me".

Much like his marriage to Lamont, this union was by all accounts stable and happy. They remained married until MacMurray's death in 1991.

=== Politics ===
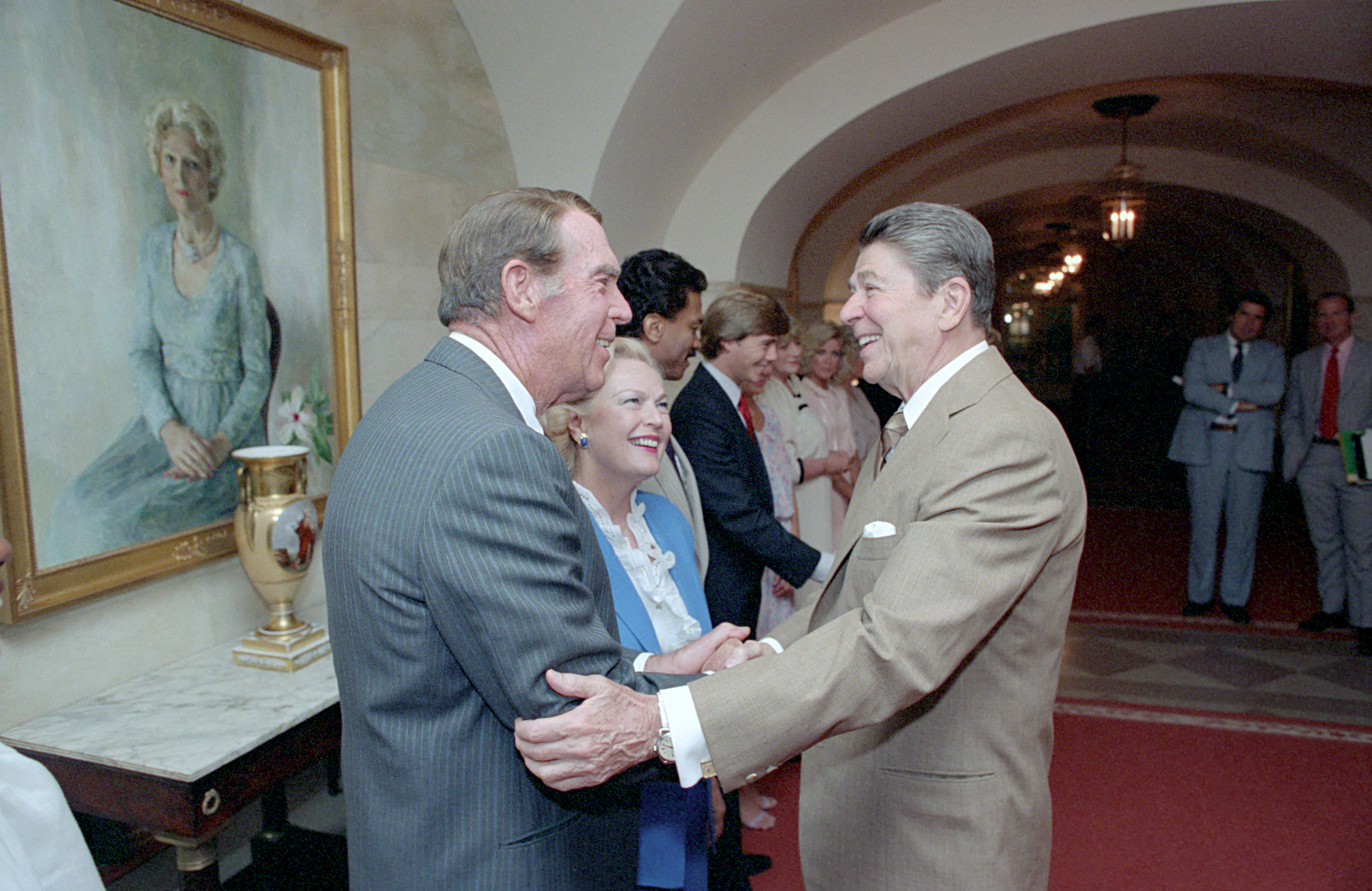
President Ronald Reagan greeting MacMurray and his wife June Haver (1984)

Like many of his Hollywood contemporaries, MacMurray was a Republican politically, although he was not particularly outspoken about his beliefs. When speaking with columnist Parsons in 1947 about the Red Scare in Hollywood, the actor noted "I suppose there really are some Reds in Hollywood...but don't you think that actually some of the people...get that reputation because they talk too much about things they don't understand? I don't think an actor has any business to discuss politics unless he is an authority..." He is further quoted "...just because I happen to be an actor I shouldn't get up and say 'vote for this man', knowing as little as I know about him...I'm a family man and that's about it".

He joined a long list of Hollywood stars as a member of the Hollywood Anti-Nazi League, which was organized by the Communist Party of the USA in 1936. MacMurray appeared onstage along with other conservative luminaries stumping for Thomas Dewey in the 1944 presidential election, supported Ronald Reagan for Governor of California in the 1966 California gubernatorial election, and joined Bob Hope and James Stewart in supporting Richard Nixon in the 1968 presidential election.

== Illness and death ==
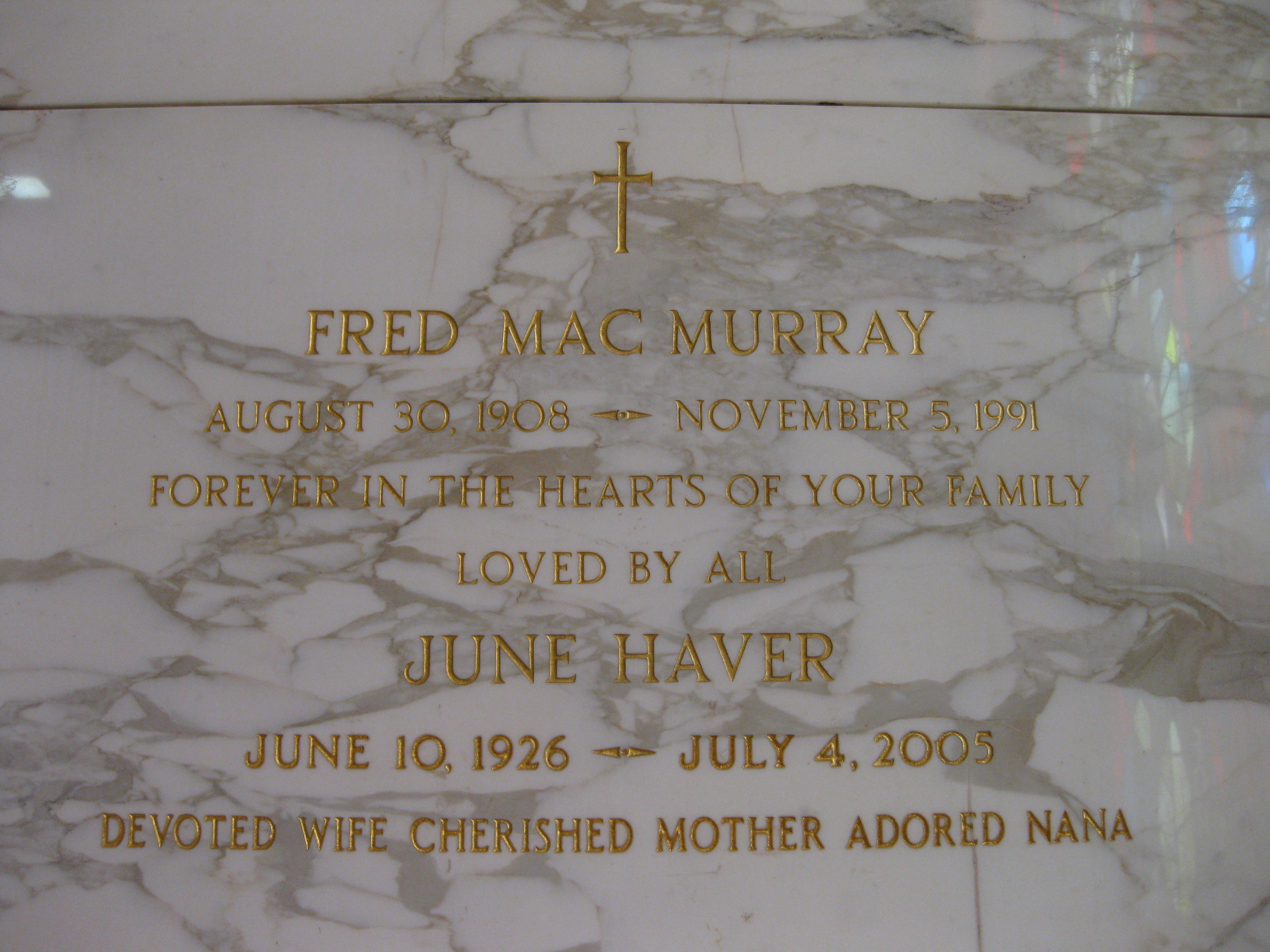
MacMurray and June Haver's grave at Holy Cross Cemetery, Culver City, California

A lifelong heavy smoker, MacMurray had throat cancer in the late 1970s, and it recurred in 1987. He had a severe stroke in December 1988 that paralyzed his right side and affected his speech. With therapy, he made a 90 percent recovery.

After suffering from leukemia for more than a decade, MacMurray died of pneumonia on November 5, 1991, in Santa Monica, California.

== Awards and influence ==
In 1939, artist C. C. Beck used MacMurray as the initial model for the superhero character who became Fawcett Comics' Captain Marvel.

MacMurray was nominated for a Golden Globe Award for Best Actor in a Motion Picture – Musical or Comedy for The Absent-Minded Professor. In 1987, he became the first person to be honored as a Disney Legend.

== Archive ==
The Academy Film Archive houses the Fred MacMurray–June Haver Collection. The film materials are complemented by papers at the Academy's Margaret Herrick Library.

The film collection includes home movies of the MacMurray family as well as prints of his feature films, shorts, and commercials.

== Filmography ==
=== Film ===
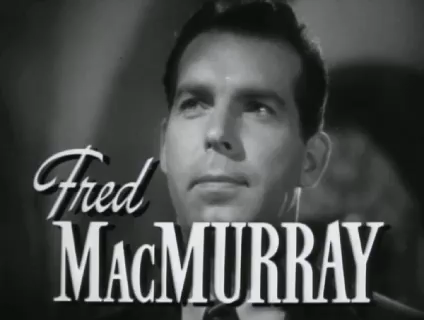
MacMurray in Above Suspicion (1943)

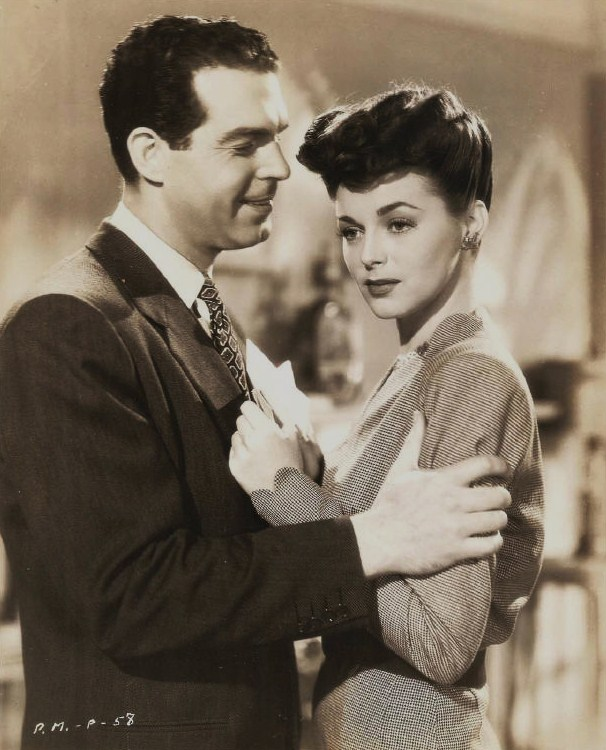
MacMurray with Marguerite Chapman in Pardon My Past (1945)

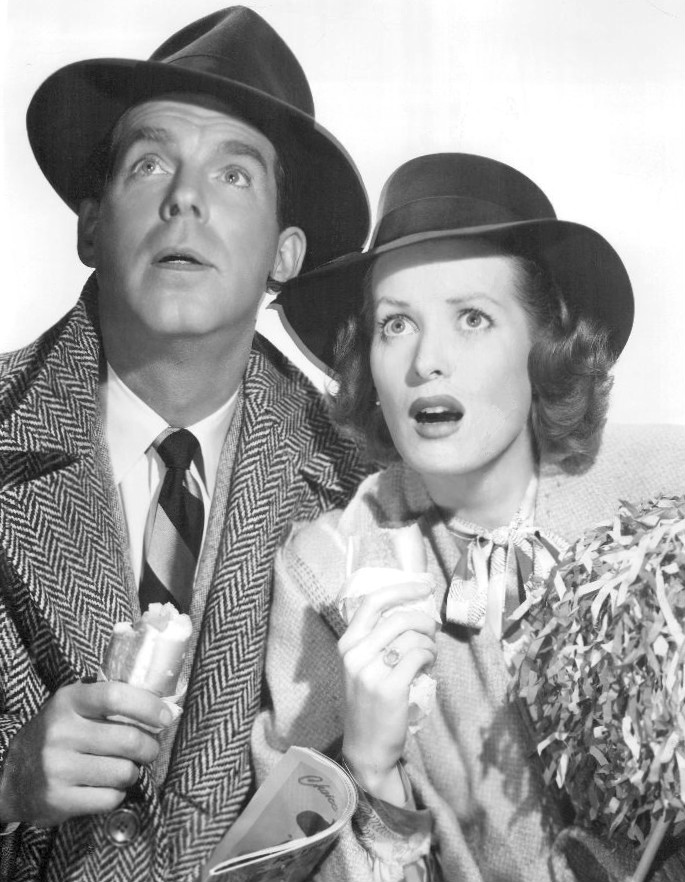
MacMurray with Maureen O'Hara in Father Was a Fullback (1949)

Year	Title	Role	Notes
1929	Girls Gone Wild	Extra	Film debut Uncredited
1929	Why Leave Home?		Uncredited
1929	Tiger Rose	Rancher	Uncredited
1934	Friends of Mr. Sweeney	Walk-on part	Uncredited
1935	Grand Old Girl	Sandy	
1935	The Gilded Lily	Peter Dawes	
1935	Car 99	Trooper Ross Martin	
1935	Men Without Names	Richard Hood / Richard "Dick" Grant	
1935	Alice Adams	Arthur Russell	
1935	Hands Across the Table	Theodore Drew III	
1935	The Bride Comes Home	Cyrus Anderson	
1936	The Trail of the Lonesome Pine	Jack Hale	
1936	13 Hours by Air	Jack Gordon	
1936	The Princess Comes Across	Joe King Mantell	
1936	The Texas Rangers	Jim Hawkins	
1937	Champagne Waltz	Buzzy Bellew	
1937	Maid of Salem	Roger Coverman of Virginia	
1937	Swing High, Swing Low	Skid Johnson	
1937	Exclusive	Ralph Houston	
1937	True Confession	Kenneth Bartlett	
1938	Cocoanut Grove	Johnny Prentice	
1938	Men with Wings	Pat Falconer	
1938	Sing You Sinners	David Beebe	
1939	Cafe Society	Crick O'Bannon	
1939	Invitation to Happiness	Albert 'King' Cole	
1939	Honeymoon in Bali	Bill 'Willie' Burnett	
1940	Remember the Night	John Sargent	
1940	Little Old New York	Charles Brownne	
1940	Too Many Husbands	Bill Cardew	
1940	Rangers of Fortune	Gil Farra	
1941	Virginia	Stonewall Elliott	
1941	One Night in Lisbon	Dwight Houston	
1941	Dive Bomber	Joe Blake	
1941	New York Town	Victor Ballard	
1942	The Lady Is Willing	Dr. Corey T. McBain	
1942	Star Spangled Rhythm	Frank in Card-Playing Skit	
1942	Take a Letter, Darling	Tom Verney	
1942	The Forest Rangers	Don Stuart	
1943	No Time for Love	Jim Ryan	
1943	Flight for Freedom	Randy Britton	
1943	Above Suspicion	Richard Myles	
1944	Standing Room Only	Lee Stevens	
1944	And the Angels Sing	Happy Morgan	
1944	Double Indemnity	Walter Neff	
1944	Practically Yours	Daniel Bellamy	
1945	Where Do We Go from Here?	Bill Morgan	
1945	Captain Eddie	Edward Rickenbacker	
1945	Murder, He Says	Pete Marshall	
1945	Pardon My Past	Eddie York / Francis Pemberton	
1946	Smoky	Clint Barkley	
1947	Suddenly, It's Spring	Peter Morely	
1947	The Egg and I	Bob MacDonald	
1947	Singapore	Matt Gordon	
1948	On Our Merry Way	Al	
1948	The Miracle of the Bells	Bill Dunnigan	
1948	An Innocent Affair	Vincent Doane	
1949	Family Honeymoon	Grant Jordan	
1949	Father Was a Fullback	George Cooper	
1950	Borderline	Johnny McEvoy – aka Johnny Macklin	
1950	Never a Dull Moment	Chris	
1951	A Millionaire for Christy	Peter Ulysses Lockwood	
1951	Callaway Went Thataway	Mike Frye	
1953	Fair Wind to Java	Captain Boll	
1953	The Moonlighter	Wes Anderson	
1954	The Caine Mutiny	Tom Keefer	
1954	Pushover	Paul Sheridan	
1954	Woman's World	Sid Burns	
1955	The Far Horizons	Captain Meriwether Lewis	
1955	The Rains of Ranchipur	Thomas "Tom" Ransome	
1955	At Gunpoint	Jack Wright	
1956	There's Always Tomorrow	Clifford Groves	
1957	Gun for a Coward	Will Keough	
1957	Quantez	Gentry / John Coventry	
1958	Day of the Badman	Judge Jim Scott	
1959	Good Day for a Hanging	Marshal Ben Cutler	
1959	The Shaggy Dog	Wilson Daniels	
1959	Face of a Fugitive	Jim Larsen aka Ray Kincaid	
1959	The Oregon Trail	Neal Harris	
1960	The Apartment	Jeff D. Sheldrake	
1961	The Absent-Minded Professor	Professor Ned Brainard	
1962	Bon Voyage!	Harry Willard	
1963	Son of Flubber	Ned Brainard	
1964	Kisses for My President	Thad McCloud	
1966	Follow Me, Boys!	Lemuel Siddons	
1967	The Happiest Millionaire	Antony Drexel-Biddle	
1973	Charley and the Angel	Charley Appleby	
1978	The Swarm	Mayor Clarence Tuttle	Final film role

=== Short subjects ===
Year	Title	Role	Notes
1940	Screen Snapshots: Art and Artists	Himself	
1941	Hedda Hopper's Hollywood No. 1	Himself	Uncredited
1941	Popular Science	Himself	Uncredited
1943	Show Business at War	Himself	Uncredited
1943	The Last Will and Testament of Tom Smith	Narrator	Uncredited
1949	Screen Snapshots: Motion Picture Mothers, Inc.	Himself	

=== Television ===
Year	Title	Role	Notes
1954	The Jack Benny Program	Himself	Episode: "The Jam Session Show"
1955; 1958	General Electric Theater	Richard Elgin / Harry Wingate	Episodes: "The Bachelor's Bride" and "One Is a Wanderer"
1956	Screen Directors Playhouse	Peter Terrance	Episode: "It's a Most Unusual Day"
1957	The 20th Century-Fox Hour	Peterson	Episode: "False Witness"
1958	Lucy-Desi Comedy Hour	Himself	Episode: "Lucy Hunts Uranium"
1958	Cimarron City	Himself	Episode: "I, the People"
1960	The United States Steel Hour	Himself	Episode: "The American Cowboy"
1960–1972	My Three Sons	Steve Douglas	380 episodes
1964	Summer Playhouse	Himself	Episode: "The Apartment House"
1974	The Chadwick Family	Ned Chadwick	Television film
1975	Beyond the Bermuda Triangle	Harry Ballinger	Television film

=== Theater ===
Year	Title
1930–31	Three's a Crowd
1933–34	Roberta

== Radio ==
- Lux Radio Theatre – Pete Dawes ("The Gilded Lily") (1937), Victor Hallam ("Another Language") (1937), John Horace Mason ("Made for Each Other") (1940), Bill Dunnigan ("The Miracle of the Bells) (1948)
- The Screen Guild Theater – The Philadelphia Story (1942)
- Screen Directors Playhouse – Take a Letter, Darling (1951)
- Bright Star – George Harvey (1952–53)
- Lux Summer Theatre – The Lady and the Tumblers (1953)
- The Martin and Lewis Show – Himself (1953)
