= Street Girl =

1929 film

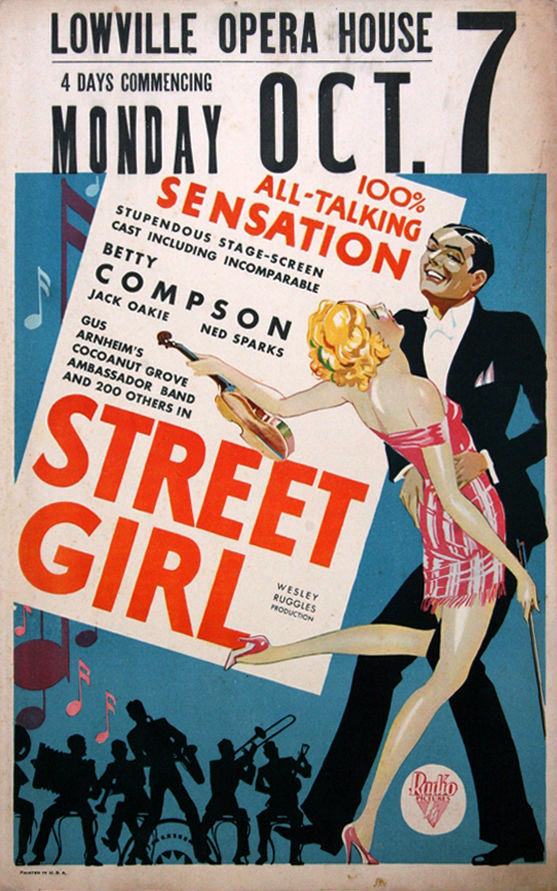
- Theatrical poster
- Directed by: Wesley Ruggles
- Written by: Jane Murfin
- Based on: The Viennese Charmer; 1928 Young's Magazine by W. Carey Wonderly
- Produced by: A Wesley Ruggles Production produced by William LeBaron; Louis Sarecky (associate producer)
- Starring: Betty Compson; John Harron; Jack Oakie
- Cinematography: Leo Tover
- Edited by: Ann McKnight; William Hamilton
- Music by: Oscar Levant; Sidney Clare
- Production companies: A Radio Picture; RKO Productions, Inc.
- Distributed by: RKO Distributing Corp'n.
- Release dates: July 30, 1929 (Premiere-New York City); August 21, 1929 (US)
- Running time: 87 minutes
- Country: United States
- Language: English
- Budget: $211,000
- Box office: $1,004,000

A banner outside a movie theater advertising the film in 1929.

Street Girl is a 1929 pre-Code musical film directed by Wesley Ruggles and starring Betty Compson, John Harron and Jack Oakie. It was adapted by Jane Murfin from "The Viennese Charmer", a short story by William Carey Wonderly. While it was the first film made by RKO Radio Pictures, its opening was delayed until after Syncopation, making it RKO's second release. It was very successful at the box office, accounting for almost half of RKO's profits for the entire year.

== Plot ==
The Four Seasons are a very good jazz quartet, but they perform in a New York City cafe for only $100 a week, forcing them to share a small, rundown apartment. The quartet consists of Joe Spring on clarinet, Pete Summer on accordion and guitar, Mike Fall on piano and trumpet, and an ever-pessimistic Happy Winter on violin.

On his way home one night, Mike drives off a man accosting a young woman named Frederika Joyzelle. When she tells him she has not eaten in two days, he persuades her to share the group's dinner. She tells them that back in her homeland, she was a violinist. The highlight of her career given a command performance for her homeland's ruler, Prince Nicholaus of Aregon. Mike convinces his bandmates to allow "Freddie" to room with them for two weeks, after they discover she has no place to go. Freddie talks the band into asking for a raise to $200, but when they are turned down, they impulsively quit. Mike is further discouraged when they return to the apartment to find Freddie gone.

However, Freddie soon returns with great news. She has spent all day trying to convince Keppel, the owner of the well-known Little Aregon Cafe, to give the quartet a tryout. She finally succeeded, and at a salary of $300 a week. She gets a job there too, as a cigarette girl and part-time violinist. As time goes on, Mike falls in love with Freddie, but is unsure how she feels about him.

Prince Nicholaus of Aregon is in town, trying to arrange financing for his country. He and his entourage go to the cafe, much to Keppel's delight. When Freddie performs for him, he remembers her and kisses her on the forehead. The newspaper coverage of the kiss causes the cafe to skyrocket in popularity overnight. When a competitor of Keppel's asks the group to perform at his establishment, Keppel wins a bidding war by raising their wages to $3000 a week. This enables them to move into a much fancier apartment. However, the kiss also causes Mike to become jealous to the point of quitting the band.

The popularity of Keppel's cafe allows him to move into the larger "Club Joyzelle". With the help of Prince Nicholaus, Freddie and Mike are reunited in time for the grand opening. Even Happy, who is anything but, smiles as a result.

== Cast ==
- Betty Compson as Frederika "Freddy" Joyzelle
- John Harron as Mike Fall
- Jack Oakie as Joe Spring
- Ned Sparks as Happy Winter
- Guy Buccola as Pete Summer
- Joseph Cawthorn as Keppel
- Ivan Lebedeff as Prince Nicholaus of Aregon
- Doris Eaton as Singer at Club Joyzelle
- Gus Arnheim and His Ambassadors

=== Unbilled ===
- André Cheron as Aide to Prince Nicholaus
- June Clyde as Blonde at McGregor's
- Russ Columbo as Violinist with Gus Arnheim and His Ambassadors
- Eddie Kane as Mr. Gilman
- Wilfrid North as Man with Prince Nicholaus
- Rolfe Sedan as Patron at Little Aregon
- Ellinor Vanderveer as Dowager at Little Aregon
- Florence Wix as Prince Nicolaus' Escort

== Reception ==
The film opened at New York City's Globe Theatre (now named the Lunt-Fontanne Theatre) and earned over a million dollars for RKO. It made $806,000 domestically and $198,000 overseas, resulting in a profit of $800,000, almost half of RKO's total profit for the year of $1,670,000.

== Songs ==
- "My Dream Memory" — Oscar Levant and Sidney Clare — Performed by Betty Compson on violin
- "Lovable and Sweet" — Oscar Levant and Sidney Clare — Performed by John Harron, Ned Sparks, Jack Oakie, and Guy Buccola
- "Broken Up Tune You're Doin' It" — Oscar Levant and Sidney Clare — Performed by Doris Eaton with Gus Arnheim band

== Remakes ==
Due to its initial success, Street Girl was remade by RKO twice. The first film, That Girl From Paris (1936), starred Lily Pons and Lucille Ball. The second, Four Jacks and a Jill (1942), starred Ray Bolger, Anne Shirley, and Desi Arnaz. This was a rare coincidence in Hollywood where a husband and wife appeared in two different versions of the same film.

== Notes ==
The March 1928 short story upon which the film is based originally appeared in Young's Magazine, and its title, "The Viennese Charmer", would indicate that Freddie's original homeland might have been Austria, but was fictionalized to Aregon for the film version.

== See also ==
- List of early sound feature films (1926–1929)
