= Wesley Ruggles =

American film director (1889–1972)

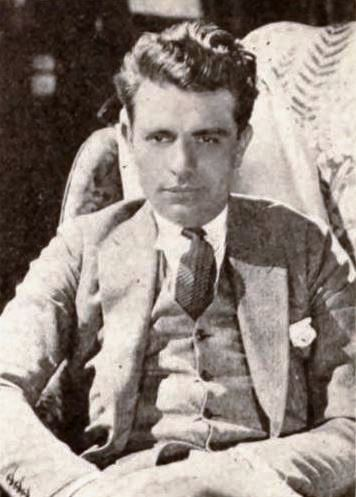
- Ruggles in 1920
- Born: June 11, 1889; Los Angeles, California, U.S.
- Died: January 8, 1972 (aged 82); Santa Monica, California, U.S.
- Occupation: Film director
- Years active: 1915–1946
- Spouses: Virginia Caldwell (m. 1920; div. 1924) Arline Judge (m. 1931; div. 1937) Marcelle Rogez (m. 1940)

Wesley Ruggles (June 11, 1889 – January 8, 1972) was an American film director.

== Life and work ==
He was born in Los Angeles, California, younger brother of actor Charlie Ruggles. He began his career in 1915 as an actor, appearing in a dozen or so silent films, on occasion with Charlie Chaplin.

In 1917, he turned his attention to directing, making more than 50 films—including a silent version of Edith Wharton's novel The Age of Innocence (1924)—before he won acclaim with Cimarron in 1931. The adaptation of Edna Ferber's novel Cimarron, about homesteaders settling in the prairies of Oklahoma, was the first Western to win an Oscar as Best Picture.

Ruggles followed this success with the light comedy No Man of Her Own (1932) with Clark Gable and Carole Lombard, the comedy I'm No Angel (1933) with Mae West and Cary Grant, College Humor (1933) with Bing Crosby, and Bolero (1934) with George Raft and Carole Lombard.

He teamed with the Rank Organisation in 1946 to produce and direct London Town with Sid Field and Petula Clark, based on a story he wrote. The film—British cinema's first attempt at a Technicolor musical—is notable as being one of the biggest critical and commercial failures in this country's film history. Ironically, Ruggles had been hired to direct it because as an American, it was thought, he was better equipped to handle a musical—despite the fact that nothing in his past had prepared him to work in the genre. It was his last film. An abridged version was released in the U.S. under the title My Heart Goes Crazy by United Artists in 1953.

Ruggles died January 8, 1972, in Santa Monica, California, and was interred in the Forest Lawn Memorial Park Cemetery in Glendale, California, near his brother Charles Ruggles. For his contributions to the motion picture industry, he has a star on the Hollywood Walk of Fame at 6400 Hollywood Boulevard.

== Filmography ==
=== Film director ===
- London Town (1946)
- See Here, Private Hargrove (1944)
- Slightly Dangerous (1943)
- Somewhere I'll Find You (1942)
- You Belong to Me (1941)
- Arizona (1940)
- Too Many Husbands (1940)
- Invitation to Happiness (1939)
- Sing, You Sinners (1938)
- True Confession (1937)
- I Met Him in Paris (1937)
- Valiant Is the Word for Carrie (1936)
- The Bride Comes Home (1935)
- Accent on Youth (1935)
- Mississippi (1935, fill-in director - uncredited)
- The Gilded Lily (1935)
- Bolero (1934)
- Shoot the Works (1934)
- I'm No Angel (1933)
- College Humor (1933)
- The Monkey's Paw (1933)
- No Man of Her Own (1932)
- Roar of the Dragon (1932)
- Are These Our Children? (1931)
- Cimarron (1931, "A Wesley Ruggles Production"—not specified as director)
- The Sea Bat (1930, replaced during production: Lionel Barrymore, uncredited)
- Honey (1930)
- Condemned (1929)
- Street Girl (1929, uncredited)
- Port of Dreams (1929)
- Scandal (1929)
- Finders Keepers (1928)
- The Fourflusher (1928)
- Silk Stockings (1927)
- Beware of Widows (1927)
- Breaking Records (1927, short)
- Flashing Oars (1927, short)
- The Cinder Path (1927, short)
- The Relay (1927, short)
- Around the Bases (1927, short)
- The Last Lap (1926, short)
- The Collegians (1926, serial)
- A Man of Quality (1926)
- The Kick-Off (1926)
- Hooked at the Altar (1926, short)
- California Here We Come (1926, Short)
- The Plastic Age (1925)
- Broadway Lady (1925)
- Miss Me Again (1925, short)
- Don Coo Coo (1925, short)
- Barbara Snitches (1925, short)
- What Price Gloria? (1925, short)
- The Merry Kiddo (1925, short)
- Three Bases East (1925, short)
- Madam Sans Gin (1925, short)
- The Covered Flagon (1925, short)
- The Fast Male (1925, short)
- The Great Decide (1925, short)
- Merton of the Goofies (1925, short)
- He Who Gets Rapped (1925, short)
- The Pacemakers (1925, short)
- Welcome Granger (1925, short)
- The Age of Innocence (1924)
- Slippy McGee (1923)
- The Heart Raider (1923)
- The Remittance Woman (1923)
- Mr. Billings Spends His Dime (1923)
- If I Were Queen (1922)
- Wild Honey (1922)
- Over the Wire (1921)
- Uncharted Seas (1921)
- The Greater Claim (1921)
- Love (1920)
- The Leopard Woman (1920)
- The Desperate Hero (1920)
- Sooner or Later (1920)
- Piccadilly Jim (1919)
- The Winchester Woman (1919)
- The Blind Adventure (1918, as Wesley H. Ruggles)
- He Had to Camouflage (1917, short)
- For France (1917, as Wesley H. Ruggles)
- Outcast (1917, assistant director)
- Bobby's Bravery (1917, short)
- Bobby, the Pacifist (1917, short)
- Bobby, Philanthropist (1917, short)
- Bobby, Movie Director (1917, short)

=== Producer ===
- London Town (1946)
- You Belong to Me (1941)
- Arizona (1940, uncredited)
- Too Many Husbands (1940)
- Invitation to Happiness (1939)
- Sing, You Sinners (1938)
- I Met Him in Paris (1937)
- Valiant Is the Word for Carrie (1936)
- The Bride Comes Home (1935)
- Cimarron (1931)
- The Sea Bat (1930, uncredited)
- Street Girl (1929, uncredited)

=== Actor ===
- Triple Trouble (1918, Short) - Crook (uncredited)
- Her Torpedoed Love (1917, Short) - Messenger Inside the House (uncredited)
- Behind the Screen (1916, Short) - Actor (uncredited)
- The Pawnshop (1916, Short) - Client with Ring (uncredited)
- Beatrice Fairfax (1916) - #15 Wristwatches
- The Floorwalker (1916, Short) - Policeman (uncredited)
- Police (1916, Short) - The Crook
- A Submarine Pirate (1915, Short) - Inventor's Accomplice / Sub Officer
- Burlesque on Carmen (1915, Short) - A Vagabond (uncredited)
- Her Painted Hero (1915, Short) - Effeminate Party Guest (uncredited)
- A Night in the Show (1915, Short) - Second Man in Balcony Front Row (uncredited)
- Shanghaied (1915, Short) - Shipowner (uncredited)
- The Bank (1915, Short) - Bank Customer (uncredited)
- A Lover's Lost Control (1915, Short) - Shoe Clerk (uncredited)
- Gussle Tied to Trouble (1915, Short) - Man with Monocle (uncredited)
- Gussle's Backward Way (1915, Short) - Man with Monocle (uncredited)
- Gussle Rivals Jonah (1915, Short) - Ship Steward / Ship Passenger
- Gussle's Wayward Path (1915, Short) - Clergyman
- Caught in a Park (1915, Short) - The Cop
