= Leo Tover =

American cinematographer (1902–1964)

- Born: December 6, 1902; New Haven, Connecticut, U.S.
- Died: December 30, 1964 (aged 62); Los Angeles, California, U.S.
- Occupation: Cinematographer

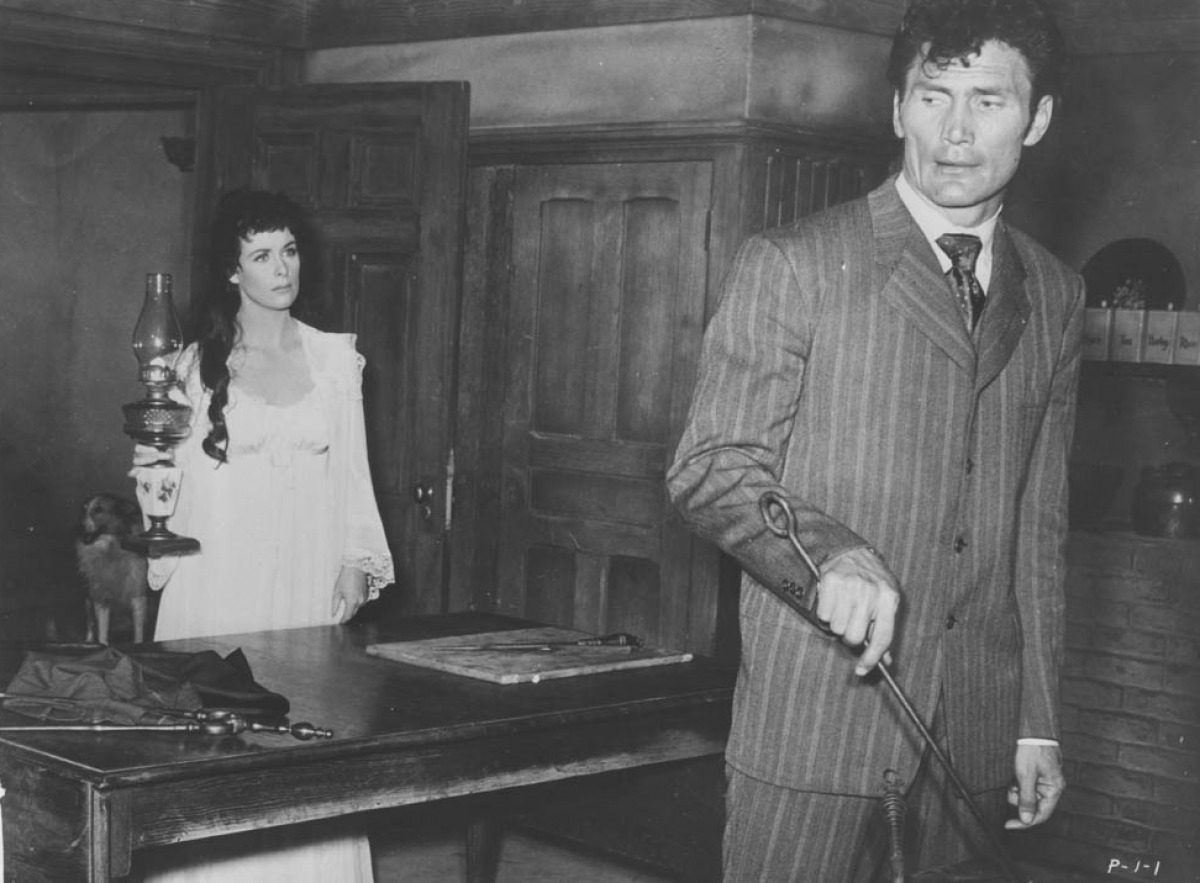

Leo Tover, A.S.C. (December 6, 1902 – December 30, 1964) was an American cinematographer, twice nominated for Academy Awards for his work on The Heiress (1949) and Hold Back the Dawn (1941). His other credits include the silent version of The Great Gatsby as well as The Day the Earth Stood Still and Payment on Demand, both released in 1951.

He was born in New Haven, Connecticut. During World War II, Tover served in the U.S. Army Signal Corps Photographic Center alongside fellow cinematographers Gerald Hirschfeld and Stanley Cortez. He died in Los Angeles, California.

== Partial filmography ==
- Fascinating Youth (1926)
- The Great Gatsby (1926)
- God Gave Me Twenty Cents (1926)
- The Telephone Girl (1927)
- Street Girl (1929)
- The Very Idea (1929)
- Tanned Legs (1929)
- The Vagabond Lover (1929)
- Girl of the Port (1930)
- The Runaway Bride (1930)
- The Fall Guy (1930)
- She's My Weakness (1930)
- I'm No Angel (1933)
- Bolero (1934)
- Murder at the Vanities (1934)
- The Bride Comes Home (1935)
- Never Say Die (1939)
- I Wanted Wings (1941)
- Hold Back the Dawn (1941)
- Victory (1941)
- The Major and the Minor (1942)
- Star Spangled Rhythm (1942)
- The Woman on the Beach (1946)
- Dead Reckoning (1947)
- The Snake Pit (1948)
- The Heiress (1949)
- My Friend Irma (1949)
- The Secret Fury (1950)
- When Willie Comes Marching Home (1950)
- Payment on Demand (1951)
- Secret of Convict Lake (1951)
- The Day the Earth Stood Still (1951)
- Pride of St. Louis (1952)
- We're Not Married (1952)
- Man in the Attic (1953)
- A Blueprint for Murder (1953)
- The President's Lady (1953)
- Untamed (1954)
- The Tall Men (1955)
- Soldier of Fortune (1955)
- Love Me Tender (1956)
- The Conqueror (1956)
- The Revolt of Mamie Stover (1956)
- The Sun Also Rises (1957)
- Fräulein (1958)
- Journey to the Center of the Earth (1959)
- Blue Denim (1959)
- Follow that Dream (1962)
- Sunday in New York (1963)
- Island of the Blue Dolphins (1964)
- Strange Bedfellows (1964)
- A Very Special Favor (1965)
