= Claude Binyon =

American film director

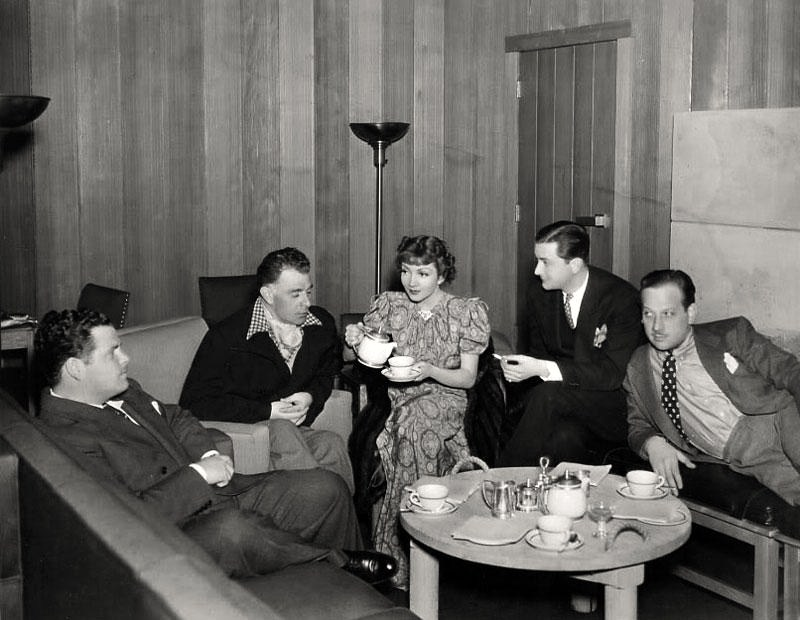
On set of I Met Him in Paris (1937), L-R: Claude Binyon (screenwriter), Wesley Ruggles (director), Claudette Colbert, Robert Young, and Melvyn Douglas

Claude Binyon (October 17, 1905 Chicago, Illinois – February 14, 1978 Glendale, California) was a screenwriter and director. His genres were comedy, musicals, and romances.

== Career ==
As a Chicago-based journalist for the Examiner newspaper, he became city editor of the show business trade magazine Variety in the late 1920s. According to Robert Landry, who worked at Variety for 50 years including as managing editor, Binyon came up with the famous 1929 stock market crash headline, "Wall Street Lays An Egg." (However, writer Ken Bloom ascribes the headline to Variety publisher Sime Silverman.)

He switched from writing about movies for Variety to screenwriting for the Paramount Studio with 1932's If I Had A Million; his later screenwriting credits included The Gilded Lily (1935), Sing You Sinners (1938), and Arizona (1940). Throughout the 1930s, Binyon's screenplays were often directed by Wesley Ruggles, including the "classic" True Confession (1938). Fourteen feature films by Ruggles had screenplays by Binyon. Claude Binyon was also the scriptwriter for the second series of the Bing Crosby Entertains radio show (1934–1935).

In 1948, Binyon made his directorial bow with The Saxon Charm (1948), for which he also wrote the screenplay. He went on to write and direct the low-key comedy noir Stella (1950), Mother Didn't Tell Me (1950), Aaron Slick of Pun'kin Crick (1952), and the Clifton Webb farce Dreamboat (1952). He directed, but didn't write, Family Honeymoon (1949) as well as Bob Hope's sole venture into 3-D, Here Come the Girls (1953).

After his death on February 14, 1978, he was buried at the Forest Lawn Memorial Park in Glendale, California.

== Selected filmography ==
- Cross My Heart (1946)
- Mother Didn't Tell Me (1950)
- Kisses for My President (1964) (co-writer)
