= Ernst Fegté =

German art director

- Born: 28 September 1900; Hamburg, Germany
- Died: 15 December 1976 (aged 76); Los Angeles, California, United States
- Occupation: Art director
- Years active: 1925-1975

Ernst Fegté (28 September 1900 – 15 December 1976) was a German art director. He was active in the American cinema from the 1920s to the 1970s, he was the art director or production designer on more than 75 feature films. He worked at Paramount Studios at the height of his career and won an Academy Award for Best Art Direction for Frenchman's Creek (1944). He was also nominated in the same category for three other films: Five Graves to Cairo (1943), The Princess and the Pirate (1944), and Destination Moon (1950). He also worked in television in the 1950s and was nominated for an Emmy Award in 1956 for his work on the series, Medic.

== Early years ==
Born in Hamburg, Germany, Fegté studied art at Hamburg University. He worked in the German cinema and created set murals for Ernst Lubitsch. Fetgé moved to the United States in the 1920s and initially worked in New York, creating backgrounds for various motion pictures produced in that city.

== Paramount years ==
By the late 1920s, Fegté had relocated to Los Angeles where he worked at Paramount Studios for approximately 20 years. He worked under Hans Dreier, Paramount's supervising art director and "developed a more classical, almost baroque sense of set design and decoration."

Fegté's notable films included The Cocoanuts (1929), Animal Crackers (1930), The General Died at Dawn (1936), The Lady Eve (1941), I Married a Witch (1942), The Palm Beach Story (1942), The Miracle of Morgan's Creek (1943), and The Uninvited (1944). He won an Academy Award for Best Art Direction for Frenchman's Creek (1944) and was nominated in the same category for Five Graves to Cairo (1943), The Princess and the Pirate (1944), and Destination Moon (1950).

He worked with Paramount's top directors, including Ernst Lubitsch (Design for Living), Fritz Lang (You and Me), Preston Sturges (The Lady Eve, The Palm Beach Story, The Miracle of Morgan's Creek), Billy Wilder (Five Graves to Cairo), René Clair (And Then There Were None, I Married a Witch), and King Vidor (So Red the Rose).

== Later years and family ==
Fegté left Paramount in the mid-1940s. His later works included psychological thrillers and science fiction fare, including Specter of the Rose (1946) and Destination Moon. In the 1950s, Fegté also worked in television, including Adventures of Superman (1952–1953), General Electric Theater (1953), Your Jeweler's Showcase (1953), Cavalcade of America (1953–1954), Medic (1955–1956), and Sergeant Preston of the Yukon (1957–1958). He was nominated for an Emmy Award in 1956 for art direction on Medic. He also designed sets for the opera.

Fetge was married to Eileen O'Kane. They had three children: Peter, Quita Lou, and Carol. He died in Los Angeles in 1976.

== Filmography ==
- Monsieur Beaucaire (1924, backgrounds)
- The Shock Punch (1925, art director)
- Wild, Wild Susan (1925, art director)
- Womanhandled (1925, art director)
- In Old Kentucky (1927, set decoration)
- The Trail of '98 (1928)
- Jealousy (1929)
- The Letter (1929)
- Nothing but the Truth (1929)
- The Talk of Hollywood (1929)
- The Cocoanuts (1929, art director)
- Animal Crackers (1930, art director)
- Design for Living (1933)
- Death Takes a Holiday (1934, art director)
- Murder at the Vanities (1934, art director)
- Kiss and Make-Up (1934, art director)
- Ladies Should Listen (1934, art director)
- We're Not Dressing (1934, art director)
- Anything Goes (1935, art director)
- Enter Madame (1935, art director)
- Paris in Spring (1935, artistic sets)
- The Princess Comes Across (1935, art director)
- So Red the Rose (1935, art directors)
- The General Died at Dawn (1936, art director)
- Rose of the Rancho (1936, art director)
- Valiant Is the Word for Carrie (1936, art director)
- Easy Living (1937)
- I Met Him in Paris (1937, art director)
- Swing High, Swing Low (1937)
- The Big Broadcast of 1938 (1938)
- College Swing (1938)
- Sing You Sinners (1938)
- You and Me (1938)
- Artists and Models Abroad (1938)
- Cafe Society (1939)
- Invitation to Happiness (1939)
- The Great Victor Herbert (1939)
- Never Say Die (1939)
- I Want a Divorce (1940, art director)
- Queen of the Mob (1940, art director)
- Safari (1940, art director)
- Birth of the Blues (1941, art director)
- The Lady Eve (1941, art director)
- One Night in Lisbon (1941, art director)
- Virginia (1941, art director)
- Lucky Jordan (1942, art director)
- I Married a Witch (1942, art director)
- The Palm Beach Story (1942, art director)
- Star Spangled Rhythm (1942, art director)
- Five Graves to Cairo (1943, art director)
- The Miracle of Morgan's Creek (1943, art director)
- Riding High (1943, art director)
- Young and Willing (1943, art director)
- Frenchman's Creek (1944, art director)
- The Great Moment (1944, art director)
- The Princess and the Pirate (1944, art director)
- The Uninvited (1944, art director)
- And Then There Were None (1945, art director)
- Wonder Man (1945, art director)
- I've Always Loved You (1946)
- Mr. Ace (1946, production design)
- Specter of the Rose (1946, production design)
- Angel and the Badman (1947, production design)
- Christmas Eve (1947, art director)
- An Innocent Affair (1948, art director)
- A Miracle Can Happen (1948)
- Canadian Pacific (1949, art director)
- Destination Moon (1950, production design)
- Quebec (1951, art director)
- Superman and the Mole Men (1951, art director)
- Models Inc. (1952)
- Run for the Hills (1953)
- Mohawk (1956)
- God Is My Partner (1957)
- Monster from Green Hell (1957)
- Sierra Stranger (1957, art director)
- Rockabilly Baby (1957, production design)
- Tarzan's Fight for Life (1958, art director)
- The Amazing Transparent Man (1960, production design)
- Beyond the Time Barrier (1960, production design)
- Desire in the Dust (1960, art director)
- B.S. I Love You (1971, art director)

== Awards ==
Fegté won an Academy Award for Best Art Direction and was nominated for three more:

Won

- Frenchman's Creek (1944) (shared with Hans Dreier and Samuel M. Comer)

Nominated

- Five Graves to Cairo (1943)
- The Princess and the Pirate (1944)
- Destination Moon (1950)
