= Design for Living (film) =

1933 American film

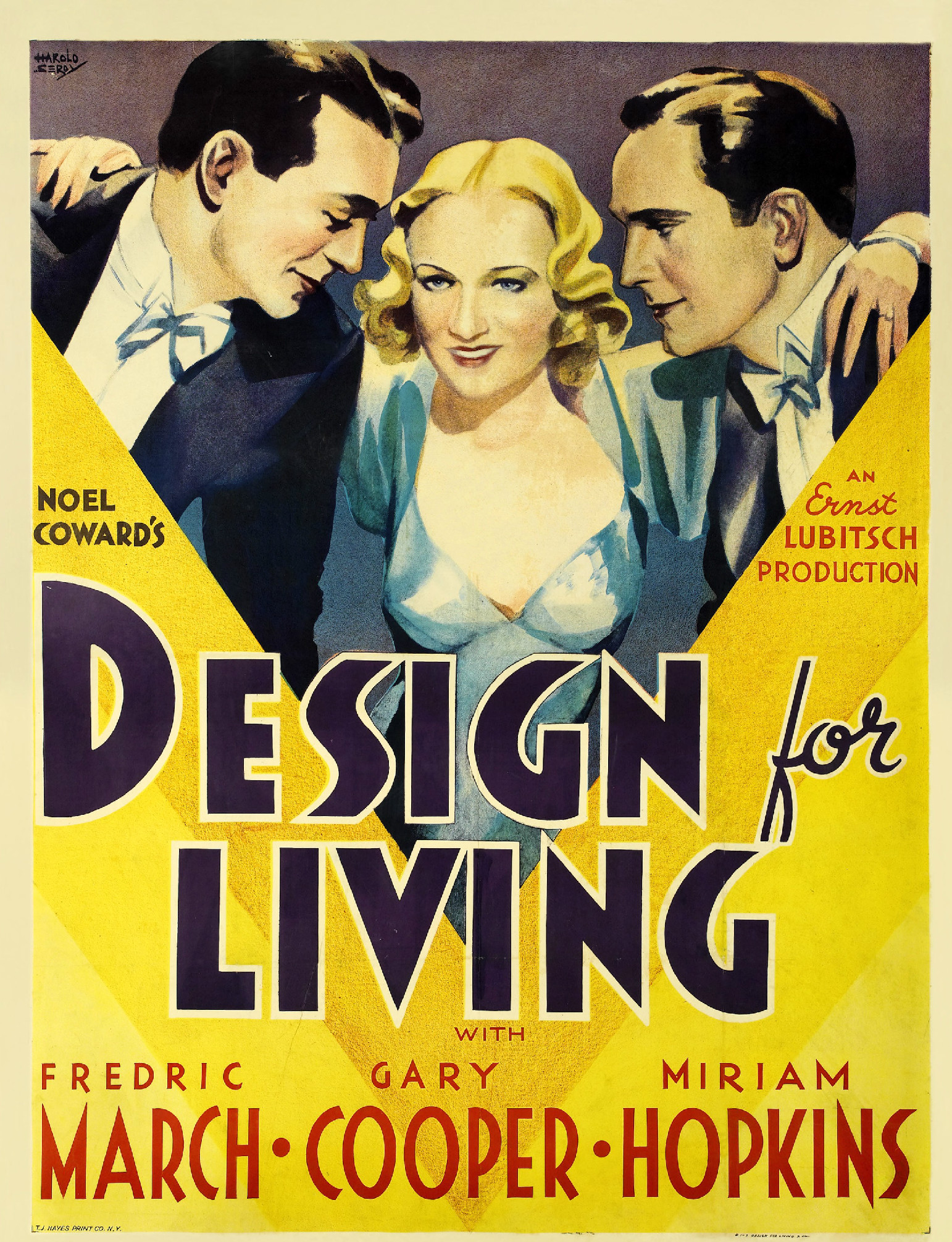
- Theatrical release poster
- Directed by: Ernst Lubitsch
- Screenplay by: Ben Hecht
- Based on: Design for Living; 1932 play by Noël Coward
- Produced by: Ernst Lubitsch
- Starring: Fredric March; Gary Cooper; Miriam Hopkins
- Cinematography: Victor Milner
- Edited by: Frances Marsh
- Production company: Paramount Pictures
- Distributed by: Paramount Pictures
- Release date: December 29, 1933 (United States)
- Running time: 91 minutes
- Country: United States
- Language: English

Design for Living is a 1933 American pre-Code romantic comedy film directed by Ernst Lubitsch from a screenplay by Ben Hecht, based on the 1932 play of the same name by Noël Coward. Starring Fredric March, Gary Cooper, and Miriam Hopkins, the film is about a woman who cannot decide between two men who love her, and the trio agree to try living together in a platonic friendly relationship.

Criticism was mixed, with some critics praising the film, but many were ambivalent about its great departure from Coward's play. Coward said, "I'm told that there are three of my original lines left in the film—such original ones as 'Pass the mustard'." The film was a box office success, ranking as one of the top ten highest-grossing films of 1933. All three of the lead actors—March, Cooper, and Hopkins—received attention from this film as they were all at the peak of their careers.

== Plot ==
While en route to Paris via train, commercial artist Gilda Farrell meets artist George Curtis and playwright Thomas Chambers, fellow Americans who share an apartment in the French capital. Gilda works for advertising executive Max Plunkett, who has had no success in his efforts to engage her in a romantic relationship. Tom and George each realize the other is in love with Gilda, and although they agree to forget her, they cannot resist her when she comes to visit. Unable to choose between the two, she proposes she live with them as a friend, muse, and critic—with the understanding they will not have sex.

Gilda arranges for a producer to read Tom's play and he goes to London to oversee the staging of his work. During his absence, Gilda and George become involved romantically and sexually, much to Tom's chagrin. Months later, Tom bumps into Max at the theatre. Max tells him that George has become highly successful as a portrait artist. Tom returns to Paris and discovers George has vacated their apartment and moved into a penthouse with Gilda. With George in Nice painting a portrait, Gilda and Tom rekindle their affair.

George returns and, realizing his former roommate and current lover have been trysting while he was away, orders the two to get out. Gilda decides to end the men's rivalry by marrying Max in Manhattan, but she is so upset when she receives potted plants from her former beaux that she cannot consummate the marriage. When Max hosts a party for his advertising clients, Tom and George crash the event and hide in Gilda's bedroom. Max finds the three laughing on the bed and orders the men out; a brawl ensues, prompting all the guests to depart. Gilda announces she is leaving her husband, and she, Tom, and George decide to return to Paris and their unusual living arrangement.

== Cast ==
- Fredric March as Tom Chambers
- Gary Cooper as George Curtis
- Miriam Hopkins as Gilda Farrell
- Edward Everett Horton as Max Plunkett
- Franklin Pangborn as Mr. Douglas
- Isabel Jewell as Max's stenographer
- Jane Darwell as George's housekeeper
- Wyndham Standing as Max's butler

== Production ==
In the late 1920s and early 1930s, Coward wrote a succession of popular hit plays. On Broadway, Design for Living was a popular and critical hit starring Lynn Fontanne, Alfred Lunt and Coward, and its risqué ménage-à-trois theme made it controversial. Design for Living was one of more than a dozen of Coward's plays made into feature films.

Ernst Lubitsch initially asked Samson Raphaelson to write the screenplay, but he had no interest in adapting Coward. The director then turned to Ben Hecht, and they opted for a loose adaptation of Coward's plot, completely rewriting the play. In the original, the three main characters were sophisticated, urbane and cynical. Hecht changed the men's names, and the trio became naïve and exuberant, living the bohemian life worry-free in the middle of the Great Depression.

Lubitsch hoped to cast Ronald Colman and Leslie Howard as the male leads, but Colman demanded too much money and Howard didn't want to risk comparisons to the play's original cast. The director originally cast Douglas Fairbanks, Jr. as George, but the actor contracted pneumonia and had to withdraw just before filming began, and he was replaced by Gary Cooper. Lubitsch cast Paramount contract player Fredric March as Tom. According to the New York State Writers Institute website, a highlight of the film is the scene where, while struggling at his playwriting, he begs Miriam Hopkins, as Gilda, to smack him between the shoulder blades. Gilda was a role well-tailored for Hopkins' talents. Comic character actors Edward Everett Horton and Franklin Pangborn completed the principal cast.

Before officials began enforcing the Production Code in 1934, leading to censorship of sexuality from films, Paramount and other studios produced many with sexual or controversial content, including films starring Mae West, W. C. Fields and Marlene Dietrich and the fantasy films of Josef von Sternberg. From 1929 to 1934, Lubitsch "made Paramount the ne plus ultra of sophisticated sexiness," joyously weaving adult sexuality, cosmopolitan flair and a disdain for convention into his films, which included The Love Parade, Monte Carlo, Trouble in Paradise, The Smiling Lieutenant, and One Hour with You. Censorship difficulties arose with Design for Living due to sexual discussions and innuendos in the film. The Hays Office eventually approved it for release, but the film later was banned by the Legion of Decency, and in 1934 it was refused a certificate by the PCA for re-release under the strict new rules. The film's risqué subject matter also attracted press notice.

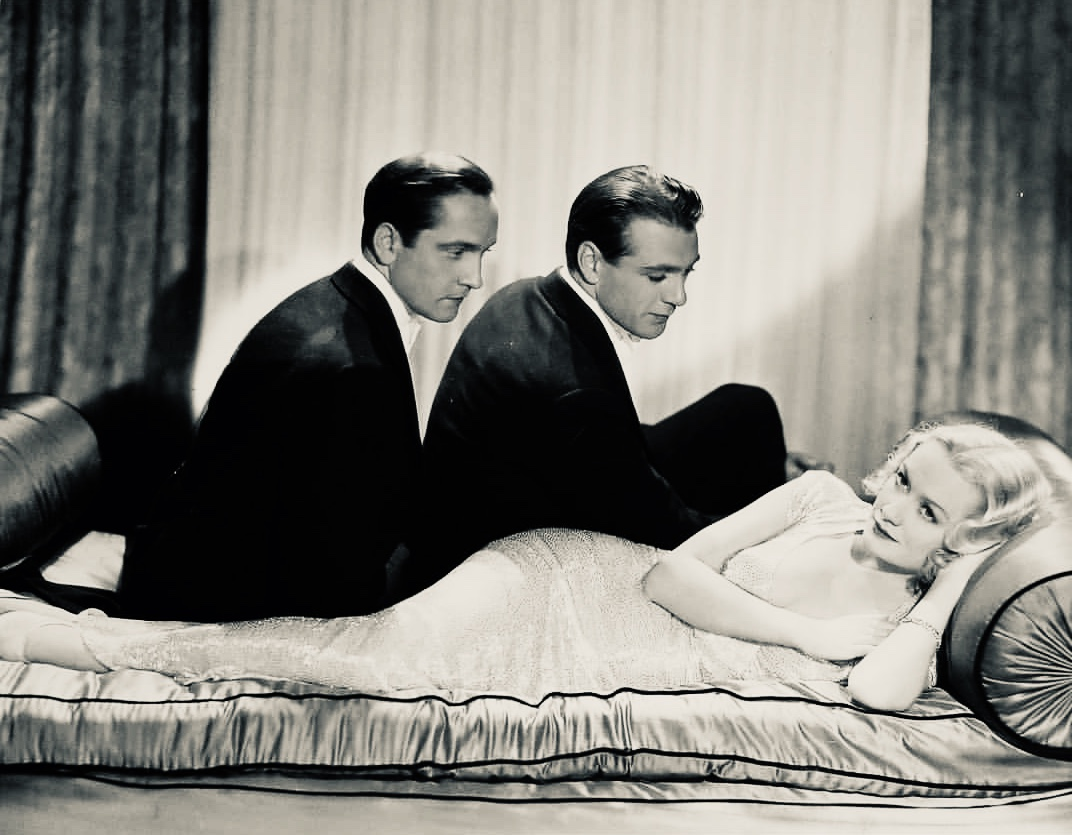
Fredric March, Gary Cooper and Miriam Hopkins in a publicity still for the film

=== Production credits ===
- Ernst Lubitsch – director
- Noël Coward – underlying story
- Ben Hecht – screenplay
- Victor Milner – photography
- Ernst Fegté – art director (uncredited)

== Critical reception ==
Mordaunt Hall of The New York Times said the film "may be only a skeleton of the parent work, but it has the same familiar rattle.... Notwithstanding the fact that Mr. Coward's clever lines were tossed to the four winds and that the whole action of the story is materially changed, Mr. Lubitsch, who knows his motion picture as few others do, has in this offering... fashioned a most entertaining and highly sophisticated subject, wherein his own sly humor is constantly in evidence. He has been ably aided and abetted by Mr. Hecht in this slaughter of the Coward play, and, if the original was sharper and brisker than the picture, the latter is filled with clever fun and the story, still with a decided Parisian flair, moves along swiftly and surely."

Time Out London observed, "Noël Coward's teacup wit and elegance hardly suits the beer glass temperament of his screen adapter Ben Hecht.... The script galumphs when it should glide, and neither the director nor the stellar cast can bring this would-be soufflé about a bohemian ménage-à-trois... to the right fluffy consistency."

The film has been well-regarded by posterity. Reviewing the film on the occasion of its 2011 Blu-Ray release, Joseph Jon Lanthier of Slant Magazine gave it four and a half stars out of five and noted that: "Due to the uncommonly risqué, if comically clunky, plot points (...), Design for Living is often considered minor Lubitsch and major pre-Code—but it's more accurately major Ben Hecht." Louis Chilton of The Independent writing in 2023, "Witty, humane and progressive, Design for Living has aged shockingly well, and arguably remains the urtext for exploring throuples on film." Similarly, Toussaint Egan and Pete Volk wrote on Polygon in 2022 that Design for Living was one of the best pre-Code films, calling it a "clever comedy with charismatic and attractive movie stars in the leading roles […] a romp of a time from one of the all-time great directors."

== Home media ==
The film was released on DVD on May 31, 2005, as part of The Gary Cooper Collection, which also includes The Lives of a Bengal Lancer, Peter Ibbetson, The General Died at Dawn, and Beau Geste. It was later released on both DVD and Blu-ray by The Criterion Collection on December 6, 2011, containing several extras, unlike The Gary Cooper Collection.

== See also ==
- National Recovery Administration (NRA), the logo displayed at start of film
