= Safari (1940 film) =

- Directed by: Edward H. Griffith
- Written by: Delmer Daves
- Based on: story by Paul Hervey Fox
- Produced by: Anthony Veiller
- Starring: Douglas Fairbanks Jr. Madeleine Carroll; Tullio Carminati
- Cinematography: Ted Tetzlaff
- Edited by: Eda Warren
- Music by: Friedrich Hollaender
- Production company: Paramount Pictures
- Distributed by: Paramount Pictures
- Release dates: June 7, 1940 (Montreal); June 14, 1940 (United States)
- Running time: 80 minutes
- Country: United States
- Language: English

Safari is a 1940 American adventure film directed by Edward H. Griffith and starring Douglas Fairbanks Jr., Madeleine Carroll and Tullio Carminati. The film's sets were designed by the art directors Hans Dreier and Ernst Fegté.

== Plot ==
Millionaire Baron de Courland arrives in West Africa in order to hunt for big game. He is accompanied by his girlfriend, Linda Stewart.

De Courland hires Jim Logan to be his guide. During the safari, Linda falls for Jim, causing De Courland to be jealous.

== Cast ==
- Douglas Fairbanks Jr. as Jim Logan
- Madeleine Carroll as Linda Stewart
- Tullio Carminati as Baron de Courtland
- Muriel Angelus as Fay Thorne
- Lynne Overman as Jock McPhail
- Frederick Vogeding as Captain on Yacht
- Clinton Rosemondas as Mike
- Thomas Louden as Doctor Phillips
- Fred Godoy as Steward
- Jack Carr as Wemba
- Billy Gilbert as Mondehare
- Hans von Morhart as Head Quartermaster
- Darby Jones as Admiral
- Henry Rowland as Steersman

== Production ==
Paramount bought the story in May 1938. In May 1939 they announced Madeleine Carroll would star under the direction of Edward Griffith. Her co-star was going to be Joel McCrea who had just signed a two-year contract with Paramount. Another lead role was given to Whitney Bourne who Paramount were grooming for stardom.

Beryl Markham was a consultant on the film. Douglas Fairbanks Jr. recalled that she was offered a part in the picture, and she found the process of filming “scarier than flying the Atlantic solo.”

In July W. P. Lipscomb was reportedly working on the script.

In August Carroll announced she would be getting the boat back from England to start making the film in October. By this stage Douglas Fairbanks Jr had replaced McCrea as her co star.

Second unit footage was shot in Africa.

== Bibliography ==
- Kenneth M. Cameron. Africa on Film: Beyond Black and White. Continuum, 1994.
