= There's Always Juliet =

1931 play

- Original language: English
- Written by: John Van Druten
- Genre: Comedy

Premiere
- Date: 12 October 1931
- Place: Apollo Theatre, London

There's Always Juliet is a 1931 comedy play by the British writer John Van Druten about an American architect who falls in love with an Englishwoman.

It ran for 118 performances at the Apollo Theatre in London West End with a cast of Herbert Marshall, Edna Best, May Whitty and Cyril Raymond. It then transferred to Broadway's Empire Theatre with the same cast members. After a fairly lengthy run, however, producer Gilbert Miller was paid by a Hollywood studios to free Marshall for film work. He was eventually replaced by Roger Pryor, but the revived version was less successful.

It was adapted for Australian radio in 1940 starring Peter Finch.

In 1941, the play was updated into a loosely adapted film One Night in Lisbon starring Fred MacMurray, Madeleine Carroll and Patricia Morison. May Whitty reprised her role from the original play.

== Bibliography ==
- Bordman, Gerald. American Theatre: A Chronicle of Comedy and Drama, 1930-1969. Oxford University Press, 1996.
- Goble, Alan. The Complete Index to Literary Sources in Film. Walter de Gruyter, 1999.
- Wearing, J.P. The London Stage 1930-1939: A Calendar of Productions, Performers, and Personnel. Rowman & Littlefield, 2014.
