= E. Holman Clark =

British stage actor (1864–1925)

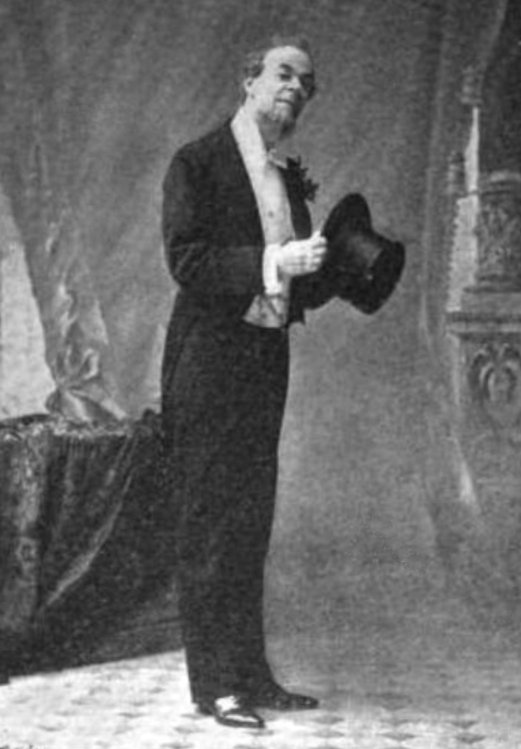
- As Colonel Kaw in Trilby
- Born: 22 April 1864; East Hoathly, Sussex, United Kingdom
- Died: 7 September 1925 (aged 61); London, United Kingdom
- Occupation: Actor
- Years active: 1913–1923 (film)

E. Holman Clark (22 April 1864 – 7 September 1925) was a British stage actor. He also appeared in seven silent films. He became famous for his annual Christmas performance as Captain Hook in J.M. Barrie's Peter Pan. In 1920 he played the title role in Walter Hackett's Mr. Todd's Experiment at the Queen's Theatre.

== Filmography ==
- A Message from Mars (1913)
- The Brass Bottle (1914)
- Red Pottage (1918)
- Her Heritage (1919)
- Once Aboard the Lugger (1920)
- False Evidence (1922)
- The Naked Man (1923)

== Bibliography ==
- Ray, Martin (2007). Joseph Conrad: Memories and Impressions : an Annotated Bibliography. Rodopi. ISBN 978-9042022980.
