= The Guilt of Janet Ames =

1947 film by Henry Levin

- Directed by: Henry Levin
- Screenplay by: Devery Freeman; Allen Rivkin; Louella MacFarlane
- Story by: Lenore Coffee
- Produced by: Helen Deutsch; Virginia Van Upp
- Starring: Rosalind Russell; Melvyn Douglas; Sid Caesar
- Cinematography: Joseph Walker
- Edited by: Charles Nelson
- Music by: George Duning
- Color process: Black and white
- Production company: Columbia Pictures
- Distributed by: Columbia Pictures
- Release date: March 6, 1947
- Running time: 83 minutes
- Country: United States
- Language: English
- Box office: $1,350,000

The Guilt of Janet Ames is a 1947 American sentimental psychological drama directed by Henry Levin, based on a story by Lenore Coffee, and starring Rosalind Russell and Melvyn Douglas. It was produced and distributed by Columbia Pictures.

== Plot ==
War widow Janet Ames is stricken unconscious by an automobile. The police find no identification on her, only a list of masculine names, including that of Smitty Cobb, a hard-drinking newspaperman. The police contact Smitty, who is shown the list, and he realizes right away who she is. He finds her at the hospital in a wheelchair, unable to walk. The doctor, who can find no physical reason for the paralysis, has referred her to a psychiatrist. Smitty, however, decides to treat her himself. He encourages Janet to describe each of the men on the list, though she has never seen or met them. They are actually ex-comrades of her soldier/husband. While in action in 1944 Europe, he had fallen on a grenade to save their lives.

The first survivor she visualizes is nightclub bouncer Joe Burton and his singer/girlfriend Katie, who dream of building a house. Janet's next vision takes her to the desert, where the second veteran on the list, Ed Pierson, is doing scientific research and living in a shack with his wife Susie. The third ex-soldier is Frank Merino, who appears with his young daughter Emmy. These three encounters remind Janet that David, her husband, had actually wanted to build a house and have a child right away, but she had dismissed both notions as too expensive and troublesome. Then, Janet, this time accompanied in the fourth vision by Smitty, attend a nightclub, where they are entertained by Sammy Weaver, the fourth survivor. He is a promising, up-and-coming comedian and after his stand-up routine concludes, he thanks her for the opportunity to lift the spirits of his audience.

Janet admits to Smitty the guilt she harbors for making David's civilian life so miserable. Smitty, however, persuades her to forgive herself for her own selfishness. When she does, the paralysis of her legs disappears. Later, Smitty, who was her dead husband's commanding officer, reveals his own guilt in having ordered David to fall on the grenade. Janet tells Smitty that he would have done so without being ordered, and that he probably never even heard the command. She then turns the tables on her healer, Smitty, by visualizing and describing their happy future life together.

== Cast ==
- Rosalind Russell as Janet Ames
- Melvyn Douglas as Smithfield Cobb
- Sid Caesar as Samuel Weaver
- Betsy Blair as Katie. This was Blair's film debut.
- Nina Foch as Susie Pearson
- Charles Cane as Walker
- Harry von Zell as Carter
- Bruce Harper as Junior
- Arthur Space as Nelson
- Richard Benedict as Joe Burton
- Frank Orth as Danny, the bartender
- Hugh Beaumont as Francis R. Merino (uncredited)
- Edwin Cooper as Surgeon
