= You and Me (1938 film) =

1938 Fritz Lang film

- Directed by: Fritz Lang
- Screenplay by: Virginia Van Upp
- Based on: Norman Krasna (Based on a story by)
- Produced by: Fritz Lang
- Starring: Sylvia Sidney; George Raft
- Cinematography: Charles Lang
- Edited by: Paul Weatherwax
- Music by: Kurt Weill
- Color process: Black and white
- Production company: Paramount Pictures
- Distributed by: Paramount Pictures
- Release dates: May 29, 1938 (Los Angeles-Premiere); June 1, 1938 (New York City); June 10, 1938 (United States)
- Running time: 94 minutes
- Country: United States
- Language: English

You and Me is a 1938 American romantic crime comedy-drama film directed by Fritz Lang. It stars Sylvia Sidney and George Raft as a pair of ex-convicts on parole, working in a department store whose owner, played by Harry Carey, routinely hires former criminals to give them a second chance. It was written by Norman Krasna and Virginia Van Upp.

== Plot ==
Mr. Morris, owner of a large department store, hires offenders released on parole to give them a chance to rehabilitate. The other staff do not know.

Among them is Joe Dennis, who is resigning and leaving for California in order to end his growing friendship with fellow-employee Helen Roberts, as he feels unworthy of her. With his violent past, he does not feel he could marry such a sweet and innocent girl. They spend a last evening together and, as he boards the Greyhound bus, she says that if he did ask to marry her the answer would be yes.

They rush to an instant marriage bureau and then back to her room. The landlady emerges to throw Joe out, but relents when Helen shows her ring. Helen says they must keep the wedding secret, because Mr Morris does not approve of employees marrying each other. In fact he does not mind, but Helen is not allowed to marry while on parole.

When Joe finds a ribboned bundle of what he assumes are love letters in Helen's room, but which are parole cards, he becomes jealous of her past, and meets up for a drink with some criminals from his own. They plan to rob Morris' store at night, and recruit him to join the operation. But one of the gang is sorry for Helen, should Joe end up back in prison, and, trying to disguise his voice on the telephone, encourages her to keep him away that night; but panicking, he fails to cover the telephone properly; she recognizes the voice, deduces why, and warns Morris.

When the robbers break into the store, they are surrounded by armed guards. Morris says he will let them go once they have listened to what Helen has to say. With considerable expertise, she outlines on a blackboard the full costs of the operation they had planned and the meager returns each individual would receive if it had succeeded. Joe is not amused by Helen's role in the affair or by her sophisticated knowledge of heist planning. As he does not offer any reconciliation, she packs her things and disappears.

Joe and his colleagues search all over town, with no leads. From Helen's parole officer, Joe learns that Helen is pregnant and that her marriage was void as it breached her parole conditions. After looking everywhere for her, one of the gang realizes that she'd probably be in a hospital, and finds her. The film ends with their second, but this time valid, marriage.

== Cast ==
- Sylvia Sidney as Helen
- George Raft as Joe Dennis
- Barton MacLane as Mickey
- Harry Carey as Mr. Morris
- Roscoe Karns as Cuffy
- George E. Stone as Patsy
- Warren Hymer as Gimpy
- Robert Cummings as Jim
- Adrian Morris as Knucks
- Roger Gray as Bath House
- Cecil Cunningham as Mrs. Morris
- Vera Gordon as Mrs. Levine
- Egon Brecher as Mr. Levine
- Willard Robertson as Dayton
- Guinn Williams as Text
- Bernadene Hayes as Nellie
- Joyce Compton as Curly Blonde
- Carol Paige as Torch Singer

== Production ==
William LeBaron of Paramount asked Norman Krasna if he could come up with a vehicle for George Raft. Krasna agreed provided he was allowed to direct. Then Carole Lombard read the script and wanted to be involved; Krasna says Paramount did not want first-time director Krasna to be entrusted with a Lombard-Raft film and tried to force Krasna off the project. In 1936, it was reported the film would be delayed because Raft did not want Krasna to direct. There was some talk John Howard might replace Raft. Arline Judge was going to star alongside Lombard. Raft was put on suspension and $24,000 of his salary was withheld. However the film did not go ahead.

Then several months later B.P. Schulberg, who was producing films for Paramount, decided to reactivate the project. He replaced Lombard with Sylvia Sidney and the male lead went to John Trent. Richard Wallace was meant to direct.

Eventually Raft—who had made a film with Sidney, Pick-Up (1933)—did the film. By May 1937, Schulberg was no longer producer and the director was Fritz Lang, who had just made Fury and You Only Live Once with Sidney.

Lang used a musical score from Kurt Weill, who "had nothing to do just then". They worked together and Weill composed introductory music for certain scenes. According to Lang, Weill left him "in the lurch" and left the project before the music was finished, and the score was completed by Boris Morros, head of Paramount's music department.

Lang says he was influenced by Bertolt Brecht, who had developed a style of theatre called Lehrstucke, theatre that teaches. "I wanted to make a didactic picture teaching the audience that crime doesn't pay", said Lang. "Which is a lie, because crime pays very well. The message was spelled out at the end by Sylvia Sidney on a blackboard to a classroom of crooks." Lang later said the scene where prisoners were nostalgic for prison was "stupid".

Robert Cummings has a small role.

== Production credits ==
- Fritz Lang - director
- Virginia Van Upp - screenplay
- Norman Krasna - story
- Charles Lang - photography
- Hans Dreier - art direction
- Ernst Fegté - art direction
- Paul Weatherwax - editor
- Harry Lindgren - sound recording
- Walter Oberst - sound recording
- A. E. Freudeman - interior decorations
- Boris Morros - musical direction
- Kurt Weill - music
- Sam Coslow - lyrics
- Phil Boutelje - musical adviser

== Songs ==
- "Song of the Cash Register"
- "Knocking Song"
- "The Right Guy for Me"
- "Romance of a Lifetime"
- "The Song of the Lie"
- "We're the Kind of People Who Sing Lullabies"

== Reception ==
=== Box office ===
The film was a box office flop. "It was—I think deservedly—my first real flop", said Lang.

=== Critical ===
On the review aggregator website Rotten Tomatoes, 86% of 7 critics' reviews are positive.

Jonathan Rosenbaum described You and Me as "among Lang's most unjustly neglected Hollywood pictures—not an unqualified success by any means but interesting, imaginative, and genuinely strange." Filmink said "it flopped and Raft may as well have done it with Krasna."

Lang later called it a "lousy picture".
