= Virginia Van Upp =

American screenwriter

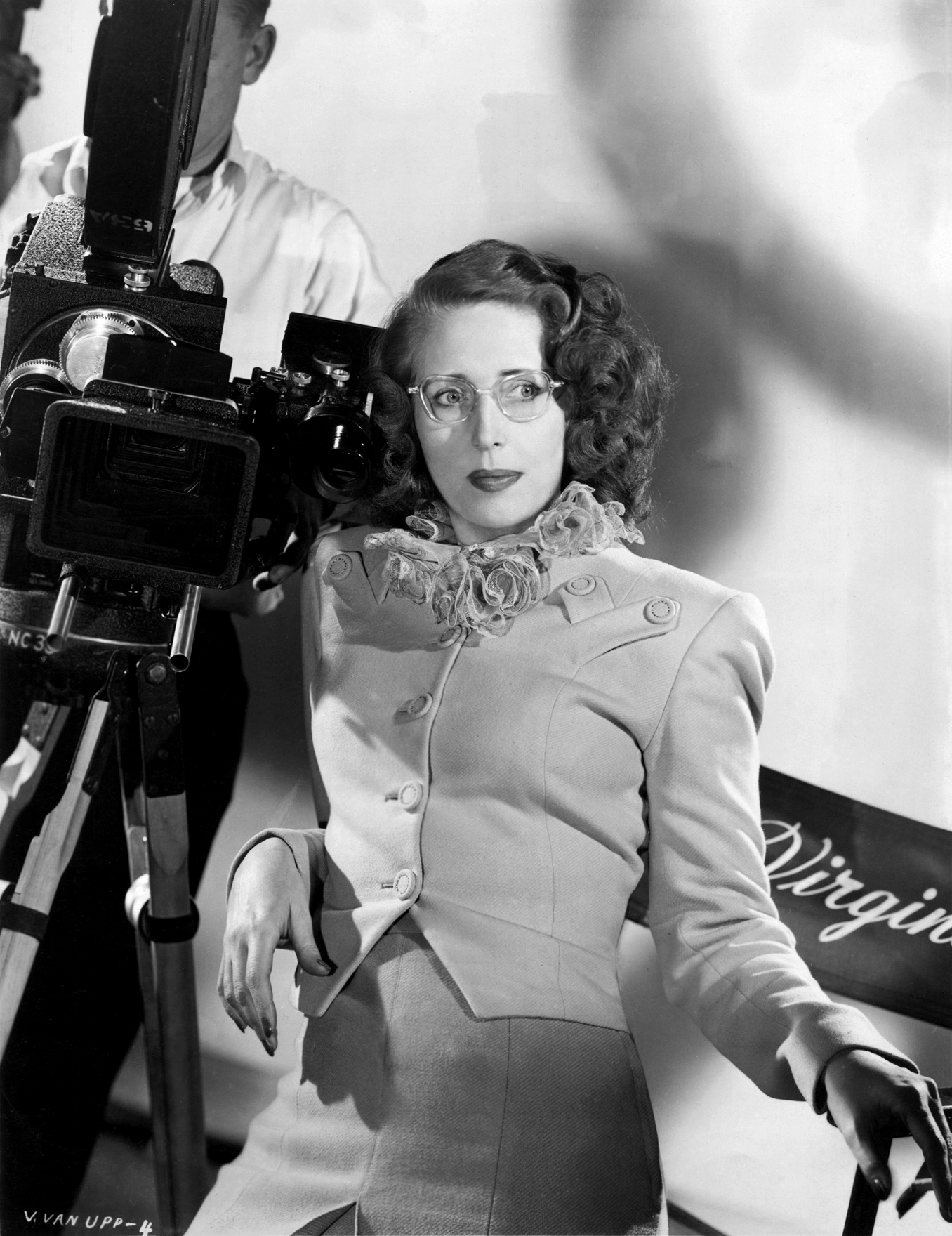
- Virginia Van Upp in 1946
- Born: January 13, 1902; Chicago, Illinois, US
- Died: March 25, 1970 (aged 68); Los Angeles, California US
- Occupations: Film producer; screenwriter

Virginia Van Upp (January 13, 1902 – March 25, 1970) was an American film producer and screenwriter.

== Early life ==
Van Upp was born in Chicago, the daughter of Harry and Helen Van Upp. Mrs Van Upp had been an editor and title writer for Thomas H. Ince.

Van Upp performed in several silent films as a child actress. She soon worked her way up in the film industry, becoming a script writer, film editor, script reader, casting director, and agent.

== Career ==
Her first screenplay credit was for Paramount Pictures' The Pursuit of Happiness (1934). She was a prolific writer and re-writer of screenplays for Paramount until 1943.

=== Queen of Columbia ===
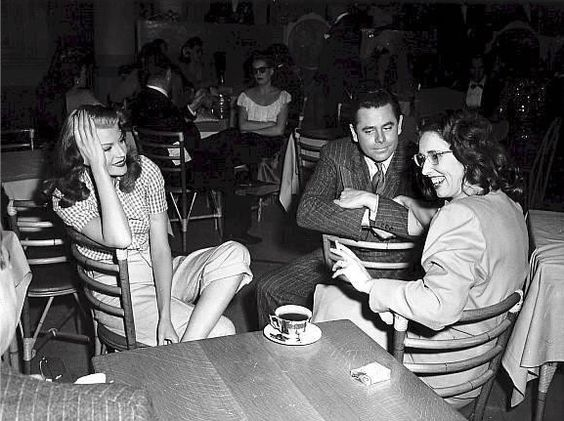
Virginia Van Upp (right) with Rita Hayworth and Glenn Ford on the set of Gilda (1946), which she co-wrote and produced

Ever on the lookout for talent, and after several writers failed to create a satisfying screenplay of Cover Girl (1944), Harry Cohn of Columbia Pictures hired Van Upp from Paramount to rewrite the script. Cover Girl was designed as a Technicolor project for Columbia's Rita Hayworth. Cohn surrounded his star with the best talent available, such as costume designers Travis Banton and Gwen Wakeling, who had extensive experience in big budget 20th Century Fox films. Cohn was initially reluctant to have Gene Kelly from MGM as Hayworth's co-star, until he was convinced that Kelly and his assistant Stanley Donen would do the choreography for the film for no extra fee. Van Upp not only fashioned a successful screenplay from the discarded drafts, but most importantly, gained the confidence of Rita Hayworth, becoming a friend and a mediator between her and the studio—even supervising Hayworth's costumes and rewriting her own work to suit Hayworth's new persona.

Seeing the impressive results, Cohn made Van Upp an associate producer and later Executive Producer at the studio. Not only did Cohn recognize the importance of appealing to the large female audiences, while men were away during World War II, but Van Upp's broad experience in the film industry at all levels made her a rarity: as opposed to most screenwriters who resented studio interference with their work, she understood and welcomed diversity of opinion and pressure from the studio to complete a successful film.

Van Upp was only one of three female producers in Hollywood at the time. (The others were Joan Harrison who was associated with Alfred Hitchcock, and Harriet Parsons, daughter of influential gossip columnist Louella Parsons.) On January 7, 1945, The New York Times commented:

Miss Van Upp's new berth is considered to be the most important position yet for a woman at a major studio. She will have the overall supervision and preparation and actual filming of twelve to fourteen top budget pictures to be made by Columbia during the year. Working under her will be several associate producers, all men.

As a producer, Van Upp's work was often uncredited, such as the recutting of Orson Welles's vehicle for his wife Rita Hayworth, The Lady from Shanghai.

Perhaps Van Upp's best remembered production is film Gilda (1946), which she co-wrote and carefully supervised.

After making The Guilt of Janet Ames (1947) with Rosalind Russell, Van Upp left Columbia to spend time with her family. Harry Cohn rewarded her with a job inspecting the Latin American market, where she visited 14 Central and South American countries. During this visit, Van Upp announced that she would produce films based on the novels Christ the Man and Tolvanera by Spanish writer Dr. Ginés de La Torre, but these plans never came to fruition. It was also announced that Virginia would produce a film on the life of Rudolph Valentino for independent producer Edward Small; Small made the film several years later without her involvement.

Van Upp's script for Christ the Man, titled The Trial, about a staging of the life of Jesus Christ in a small, American town, was projected for producer/director Frank Capra. However, on Feb. 27, 1951, Paramount announced the picture had been abandoned because of "the heavy expenditure necessary to produce it," circa $2,000,000. Capra believed the subject matter influenced the decision.

She returned to Columbia to work on Rita Hayworth's comeback film Affair in Trinidad (1952), which reunited her with Gilda co-star Glenn Ford.

A projected film at Republic Pictures was cancelled due to an illness, and she reportedly made films for the United States Army in West Germany.

== Personal life ==
Van Upp was married twice. Her second husband was production manager Ralph W. Nelson. They were divorced in 1949. The couple had one daughter, Gay Nelson, who was featured in several of Columbia's "B" features and comedy shorts during the late 1940s.

== Filmography ==
- The Pursuit of Happiness (1934) - screenplay
- Timothy's Quest (1936) - screenplay
- Too Many Parents (1936) - screenplay
- Poppy (1936) - screenplay
- My American Wife (1936) - uncredited writer
- Easy to Take (1936) - screenplay
- Swing High, Swing Low (1937) - screenplay
- You and Me (1938) - screenplay
- St. Louis Blues (1939) - screenplay
- Honeymoon in Bali (1939) - screenplay
- Cafe Society (1939) - story, screenplay
- Virginia (1941) - story, screenplay
- Come Live with Me (1941) - story
- One Night in Lisbon (1941) - screenplay
- Bahama Passage (1941) - screenplay
- The Crystal Ball (1943) - screenplay
- Young and Willing (1943) - screenplay
- Cover Girl (1944) - screenplay
- The Impatient Years (1944) - story, screenplay, associate producer
- Together Again (1944) - screenplay, producer
- She Wouldn't Say Yes (1945) - screenplay, producer
- Gilda (1946) - producer
- The Guilt of Janet Ames (1947) - uncredited producer
- Here Comes the Groom (1951) - screenplay
- Affair in Trinidad (1952) - story, uncredited producer
