= Once Aboard the Lugger =

1920 film

- Directed by: Gerald Ames; Gaston Quiribet
- Starring: E. Holman Clark; Eileen Dennes; Evan Thomas
- Production company: Hepworth Pictures
- Distributed by: Imperial
- Release date: October 1920
- Country: United Kingdom
- Languages: Silent; English intertitles

Once Aboard the Lugger is a 1920 British silent comedy film directed by Gerald Ames and Gaston Quiribet and starring E. Holman Clark, Eileen Dennes and Evan Thomas.

== Plot ==
A hard-up student kidnaps his rich uncle's cat.

== Cast ==
- E. Holman Clark as Mr. Marrapit
- Eileen Dennes as Mary Humfray
- Evan Thomas as George
- Denis Cowles as Bill Wyvern
- Reginald Bach as Bob Chater
- Gwynne Herbert as Mrs. Major
- John MacAndrews as Fletcher
- Winifred Sadler as Mrs. Chater
- Frederick Lewis as Vyvian Howard
- Gerald Ames

== Bibliography ==
- Goble, Alan. The Complete Index to Literary Sources in Film. Walter de Gruyter, 1999.
