= The Royal Mounted Patrol =

1941 film by Lambert Hillyer

- Directed by: Lambert Hillyer
- Screenplay by: Winston Miller
- Produced by: William Berke
- Starring: Charles Starrett; Russell Hayden; Wanda McKay; Donald Curtis; Lloyd Bridges; Evan Thomas
- Cinematography: George Meehan
- Edited by: James Sweeney
- Music by: Morris Stoloff
- Production company: Columbia Pictures
- Distributed by: Columbia Pictures
- Release date: November 13, 1941
- Running time: 59 minutes
- Country: United States
- Language: English

The Royal Mounted Patrol is a 1941 American western film directed by Lambert Hillyer and written by Winston Miller. The film stars Charles Starrett, Russell Hayden, Wanda McKay, Donald Curtis, Lloyd Bridges and Evan Thomas. The film was released on November 19, 1941, by Columbia Pictures.

== Cast ==
- Charles Starrett as Tom Jeffries
- Russell Hayden as Lucky Lawrence
- Wanda McKay as Betty Duvalle
- Donald Curtis as Frenchy Duvalle
- Lloyd Bridges as Hap Andrews
- Evan Thomas as Commander
- Ted Adams as Pete
- Harrison Greene as Office Manager
- Kermit Maynard as Sgt. Coburn

== Bibliography ==
- Fetrow, Alan G. Feature Films, 1940-1949: a United States Filmography. McFarland, 1994.
