= Betrayal (1932 film) =

1932 British film by Reginald Fogwell

- Directed by: Reginald Fogwell
- Written by: Reginald Fogwell; Hubert G. Griffith
- Produced by: Reginald Fogwell
- Starring: Stewart Rome; Marjorie Hume; Leslie Perrins; Henry Charles Hewitt
- Release date: April 1932
- Running time: 65 minutes
- Country: United Kingdom
- Language: English

Betrayal is a 1932 British crime film directed by Reginald Fogwell and starring Stewart Rome, Marjorie Hume and Leslie Perrins. It was written by Fogwell and Hubert G. Griffith based on Griffith's play No Crime of Passion. A woman attempts to save her husband from being hanged for a crime he didn't commit.

== Plot ==
John Armytage returns home unexpectedly and finds Clive Wilson, one of his wife Diana's former lovers, in her bedroom. In a jealous rage he attacks and accidentally kills Wilson, and is subsequently arrested and charged with murder. When he refuses to defend his actions, Diana saves him from hanging by falsely claiming, under oath, that she was having an affair with Wilson.

== Cast ==
- Stewart Rome as John Armytage
- Marjorie Hume as Diana Armytage
- Leslie Perrins as Clive Wilson
- Henry Charles Hewitt as Sir Robert Blackburn KC
- J. Fisher White as John Lawrence KC
- Frank Atherley as Judge
- E. H. Williams as butler
- Charles Childerstone as doctor

== Reception ==
The Daily Film Renter wrote: "Conventional court-room drama, slow tempo, with acting lacking in subtlety. Story material not fresh and facts developed in leisurely manner. ... Scenario technique old-fashioned. Stewart Rome and J. Fisher very good as prisoner and K.C. respectively, but Marjorie Hume not very happily cast as wife. Painstaking production, but dated. Not for critical audiences."

Film Weekly wrote: "A photographed play which is just fair entertainment."

Kine Weekly wrote: "The story is very obvious, and the drama, such as it is, lies in a cross-examination of the prisoner by leading counsel. Flashbacks are introduced, presumably to clarify the narrative, but the picture remains exactly what it is, a photographed stage play. Still, despite its limitations, the film is not without feminine appeal and it should make a reasonably safe supporting offering for most halls."

Lionel Collier, for the British magazine, Picturegoer, wrote that the film suffered from "directorial weakness" and "does not attempt to be anything more than a photographed stage play". He found the acting to be "competent" and added, "[Stewart Rome] is an actor whom I always feel has yet to have the big chance his ability merits" and " I found Marjorie Hume a little artificial in the more dramatic moments."
