= Warned Off =

1930 film

- Directed by: Walter West
- Written by: Reginald Fogwell
- Produced by: Herbert Wilcox
- Starring: Tony Wylde; Chili Bouchier; Queenie Thomas; Wally Patch
- Production company: British & Dominions Film Corporation
- Distributed by: Jury Metro-Goldwyn
- Release date: 1930
- Country: United Kingdom
- Languages: Silent; English intertitles

Warned Off is a 1930 British silent film directed by Walter West and starring Tony Wylde, Chili Bouchier and Queenie Thomas. It was made at Cricklewood Studios.

== Cast ==
- Tony Wylde - Frank Cuthbert
- Chili Bouchier - Florrie Greville
- Queenie Thomas - Lady Violet
- Evan Thomas - Colonel Cornwallis
- Wally Patch - Miles
- Bert Tracy - Diggle
- Forbes Dawson - Lord Winterbottom
