= Virginia (1941 film) =

1941 American drama film

- Film poster
- Directed by: Edward H. Griffith
- Written by: Edward H. Griffith; Virginia Van Upp
- Produced by: Edward H. Griffith
- Starring: Madeleine Carroll; Fred MacMurray; Sterling Hayden; Helen Broderick; Marie Wilson
- Cinematography: Bert Glennon; William V. Skall
- Edited by: Eda Warren
- Music by: Victor Young
- Production company: Paramount Pictures
- Distributed by: Paramount Pictures
- Release date: January 28, 1941
- Running time: 110 minutes
- Country: United States
- Language: English

Virginia is a 1941 American Technicolor romantic drama film directed by Edward H. Griffith and starring Madeleine Carroll, Fred MacMurray, Sterling Hayden, Helen Broderick and Marie Wilson. It was produced and distributed by Paramount Pictures and marked Hayden's screen debut.

== Plot ==
At the train station of the fictional Fairville, Virginia, an African-American man named "Carburetor" is playing the guitar and singing. Stonewall Jackson "Stoney" Elliott and his daughter, "Pretty", watch the arrival of a train that has brought Charlotte "Charlie" Dunterry to town.

Charlie was born in Dunterry but has lived in New York where she worked in show business. She has returned to Fairville to sell the Dunterry estate where she was born and which she has inherited. Stoney and Charlie realize that they were childhood friends as he drives her out to the property.

Stoney is married but estranged from his wife who lives in Europe. He lives with his daughter and his cousin, "Miss Theo", in a modest home near the Dunterry property.

Charlie discovers that the 150-year-old family home, a large Colonial house designed by Thomas Jefferson, is in poor condition. Aunt Ophelia, an African-American servant who was present when Charlie was born, welcomes her back to the family home and takes her on a tour of the estate.

Norman Williams is a wealthy carpet bagger who has purchased the adjacent Elliott estate that was formerly owned by Stoney's family. Williams begins to court Charlie.

Electing to remain in Virginia and restore the Dunterry estate to its former stature, Charlie develops feelings for Stoney, but his marital situation causes him to resist. A frustrated Charlie accepts a marriage proposal from Norman, who then hides from her the knowledge that Stoney's wife is dead. Only on their wedding day does Norman's conscience persuade him to tell Charlie the truth, allowing her to follow her heart.

== Cast ==
- Madeleine Carroll as Charlotte "Charlie" Dunterry
- Fred MacMurray as Stonewall "Stoney" Elliott
- Sterling Hayden as Norman Williams
- Helen Broderick as Theo Clairmont
- Carolyn Lee as Pretty Elliott
- Marie Wilson as Connie Potter
- Paul Hurst as Thomas
- Tom Rutherford as Carter Francis
- Leigh Whipper as Ezechial
- Louise Beavers as Ophelia
- Darby Jones as Joseph
- Edward Van Sloan as Minister
- Sam McDaniel as Servant
- Charles R. Moore as Servant
- Wilson Benge as Butler
- Wanda McKay as Girl

== Production ==
Virginia was a Paramount Pictures production. Edward H. Griffith directed and produced the film and is also co-credited with the story. Virginia Van Upp wrote the screenplay and is also co-credited with the story. Bert Glennon and William V. Skall were the directors of photography. Hans Dreier and Ernst Fegté provided the production design, and Eda Warren was the film's editor.

Thomas Jefferson reportedly played a part in designing the four historic homes used in the picture. This led the director to suggest that, if the art directors guild would permit, Jefferson's name should be added to the art direction credits along with Dreier and Fegté.

== Reception ==
At the time of its release, the film was described by the Richmond Times-Dispatch as "a good picture, with a full load of laughter, action, romance and the touch of pathos that all good pictures should have."

== See also ==
- Sterling Hayden filmography

== Bibliography ==
- Fetrow, Alan G. Feature Films, 1940-1949: a United States Filmography. McFarland, 1994.
- Pascoe, John. Madeleine Carroll: Actress and Humanitarian, from The 39 Steps to the Red Cross. McFarland, 2020.
