= The Story of Papworth =

1935 film by Anthony Asquith

- Directed by: Anthony Asquith
- Written by: Major Lloyd
- Starring: C. Aubrey Smith; Madeleine Carroll; Gordon Harker
- Cinematography: Francis Carver
- Production company: British Pictorial Productions Ltd
- Release date: 1935
- Running time: 17 minutes
- Country: United Kingdom
- Language: English

The Story of Papworth (also known as The Story of Papworth, the Village of Hope) is a 1935 British short fundraising drama film directed by Anthony Asquith and starring Madeleine Carroll, Gordon Harker and C. Aubrey Smith. The screenplay by Major Lloyd concerns a consumptive (a tuberculosis sufferer) who is saved by the village of Papworth, which raises funds for his treatment. The film was available for exhibition free of change.

== Cast ==
- C. Aubrey Smith as epilogue (narrator)
- Madeleine Carroll as the introducer (narrator)
- Gordon Harker as a working man, Henry Hawkins
- Mabel Constanduros as Mrs Hawkins
- Nicholas Hannen as the vicar
- Owen Nares as Dr Strong, the doctor

== Release ==
The film shared its royal premiere before Queen Mary on 17 December 1935 at the Leicester Square Theatre with René Clair's The Ghost Goes West. The whole of the ticket proceeds was devoted to funding a nurses' home at Papworth Village Settlement.

== Reception ==
Kine Weekly wrote: "Universal has undertaken the distribution of The Story of Papworth, the novel two-reel production directed for the Papworth Village Settlement by Anthony Asquith. The picture has the remarkable star cast of Madeleine Carroll, Gordon Harker. Mabel Constanduros, Owen Nares, C. Aubrey Smith and Nicholas Hannen, and while it draws attention to the excellent work done by Papworth for sufferers from tuberculosis, it has been produced on strictly entertaining lines and contains much comedy from Gordon Harker and Mabel Constanduros, in the leading roles."
