= The Written Law =

1931 film

- Directed by: Reginald Fogwell
- Written by: Reginald Fogwell
- Produced by: Reginald Fogwell; Mansfield Markham
- Starring: Madeleine Carroll; Percy Marmont; Henry Charles Hewitt
- Production company: Reginald Fogwell Productions
- Distributed by: Ideal Films
- Release date: 10 September 1931
- Running time: 79 minutes
- Country: United Kingdom
- Language: English

The Written Law is a 1931 British drama film written and directed by Reginald Fogwell and starring Madeleine Carroll, Percy Marmont and Henry Charles Hewitt. It was shot at Elstree Studios.

== Synopsis ==
The screenplay concerns a man who is cured of blindness but conceals his recovery from his wife.

== Cast ==
- Madeleine Carroll as Lady Margaret Rochester
- Percy Marmont as Sir John Rochester
- Henry Charles Hewitt as Harry Carlisle
- James Fenton as Doctor Rawlinson
- Barbara Barlowe as Celia

== Bibliography ==
- Low, Rachael. Filmmaking in 1930s Britain. George Allen & Unwin, 1985.
- Wood, Linda. British Films, 1927-1939. British Film Institute, 1986.
