= Reginald Fogwell =

British film director, producer and screenwriter (1893–1977)

Reginald Fogwell (23 November 1893, Dartmouth, Devon -1977) was a British film director, producer and screenwriter.

== Selected filmography ==
Director

- The Warning (1928)
- Cross Roads (1930)
- The Written Law (1930)
- Madame Guillotine (1931)
- Guilt (1931)
- Betrayal (1932)
- The Wonderful Story (1932)
- Murder at the Cabaret (1936)

Screenwriter

- Two Can Play (1926)
- The Guns of Loos (1928)
- Glorious Youth (1929)
- Warned Off (1930)
- Such Is the Law (1930)
- Prince of Arcadia (1933)
- Two Hearts in Waltz Time (1934)
