= The Warning (1928 film) =

1928 film

- Directed by: Reginald Fogwell
- Written by: A.E. Bundy; Reginald Fogwell
- Starring: Percy Marmont; Fern Andra; Anne Grey; Pearl Hay
- Production company: British Projects
- Distributed by: Pro Patria Films
- Release date: November 1928
- Running time: 75 minutes
- Country: United Kingdom
- Languages: Silent; English intertitles

The Warning, also known as Introspection, is a 1928 British silent drama film directed by Reginald Fogwell and starring Percy Marmont, Fern Andra and Anne Grey. It was made at Welwyn Studios. It was originally released silent, but in 1930 it was re-released with added sound.

== Premise ==
A mother tries to dissuade her daughter from eloping.

== Cast ==
- Percy Marmont as Jim
- Fern Andra as The Other Woman
- Anne Grey as Mary
- Pearl Hay as The Child

== Bibliography ==
- Chibnall, Steve. Quota Quickies: The Birth of the British 'B' film. British Film Institute, 2007.
- Wood, Linda. British Films, 1927-1939. British Film Institute, 1986.
