= Henry Charles Hewitt =

English actor (1885–1968)

Henry Hewitt
- 1939 Spotlight photo
- Born: Henry Charles Hewitt; 28 December 1885; Highgate, London, England
- Died: 23 August 1968 (aged 82); Newbury, Berkshire, England
- Occupation: Actor
- Years active: 1905–1969

Henry Charles Hewitt (28 December 1885 – 23 August 1968) was an English stage, film and television actor. He made his stage debut in 1905.

== Filmography ==
| Year | Title | Role | Notes |
|---|---|---|---|
| 1911 | Henry VIII | Sir Thomas Lovell | Film debut |
| 1930 | The School for Scandal | Charles Surface | |
| 1931 | Madame Guillotine | Vicomte d'Avennes | |
| 1931 | The Written Law | Harry Carlisle | |
| 1931 | Stamboul | Baron von Strick | |
| 1932 | The First Mrs. Fraser | Philip Logan | |
| 1932 | Betrayal | Sir Robert Blackburn KC | |
| 1934 | Jew Süss | | Uncredited |
| 1935 | Admirals All | Flag Capt. Knox | |
| 1936 | Rembrandt | Jan Six | |
| 1937 | The High Command | Defence Counsel | |
| 1938 | Just like a Woman | Simpson | |
| 1938 | Old Iron | Wilfred | |
| 1940 | Sailors Three | Prof. Pilkington | |
| 1941 | Penn of Pennsylvania | | Uncredited |
| 1942 | The Black Sheep of Whitehall | Prof. Davys | |
| 1942 | The Day Will Dawn | Jack, News Editor | |
| 1942 | The Young Mr. Pitt | Addington | |
| 1944 | Give Us the Moon | Announcer | |
| 1948 | London Belongs to Me | Verriter | |
| 1949 | Train of Events | Actor | Segment: The Actor |
| 1951 | Happy Go Lovely | Dodds | |
| 1951 | Scrooge | Mr. Rosehed | |
| 1952 | Emergency Call | Mr. Wilberforce | |
| 1952 | Where's Charley? | Brassett | |
| 1952 | Top Secret | Minister of Health | |
| 1953 | Rob Roy, the Highland Rogue | Lord Parker | |
| 1953 | Isn't Life Wonderful! | Cousin Arthur | |
| 1954 | John Wesley | Bishop of Bristol | |
| 1956 | Now and Forever | Jeweller | |
| 1957 | Brothers in Law | Treasurer | |
| 1957 | The Naked Truth | Gunsmith | Final film |
