= Hector Abbas =

Dutch film actor (1884–1942)

- Born: 9 November 1884; Amsterdam, Netherlands
- Died: 11 November 1942 (aged 58); London; United Kingdom
- Occupation: Film actor
- Years active: 1919–1942

Hector Abbas (9 November 1884 – 11 November 1942) was a Dutch film actor who appeared mainly in British films after emigrating to the United Kingdom.

== Partial filmography ==
- The First Men in the Moon (1919)
- A Prince of Lovers (1922)
- The Wandering Jew (1923)
- Bolibar (1928)
- The School for Scandal (1930)
- Madame Guillotine (1931)
- A Gentleman of Paris (1931)
- Rembrandt (1936)
- Gypsy Melody (1936)
- The Man Who Made Diamonds (1937)
- Old Mother Riley's Circus (1941)
- The Common Touch (1941)
- "Pimpernel" Smith (1941)
- One of Our Aircraft Is Missing (1942)
