= Madame Guillotine (1931 film) =

1931 film

- French poster
- Directed by: Reginald Fogwell
- Produced by: Reginald Fogwell; Mansfield Markham
- Starring: Madeleine Carroll; Brian Aherne; Henry Hewitt
- Production companies: Reginald Fogwell; Productions
- Distributed by: Woolf & Freedman Film Service
- Release date: 19 February 1931
- Running time: 74 minutes
- Country: United Kingdom
- Language: English

Madame Guillotine is a 1931 British historical romance film directed by Reginald Fogwell and starring Madeleine Carroll, Brian Aherne and Henry Hewitt. It was written by Fogwell and Mansfield Markham, and shot at Isleworth Studios.

== Preservation status ==
The British Film Institute National Archive holds a collection of stills but no film or video materials.

== Plot summary ==
During the French Revolution, a revolutionary falls in love with and marries a noblewoman.

== Cast ==
- Madeleine Carroll as Lucille de Choisigne
- Brian Aherne as Louis Dubois
- Henry Charles Hewitt as Vicomte d'Avennes
- Frederick Culley as Marquis
- Hector Abbas as Le Blanc
- Ian MacDonald as Jacques
- J. Fisher White as Le Farge

== Reception ==
Film Weekly wrote: "Rarely has the French Revolution been put on to the screen with dramatic intent and fared so sadly as in this unfortunate picture. The film is so amateurishly made as to appear ludicrous in its dramatic moments and incoherent in its development. ... [the] story is poor enough, but allied as it is with thoroughly bad dialogue and woefully mishandled dramatic moments, it becomes almost laughable. The principals do their best with impossible roles, but fail to convince."

Kine Weekly wrote: "An artificial historical romance, an unintentional travesty, which has a conventional story, is directed without any screen sense or imagination, and does not give the well-known leading players the slightest opportunity to exploit their undoubted talent. ... Reginald Fogwell, the author and producer, has made an unsatisfactory job of this film, for the continuity is clumsy – big gaps are crudely bridged by inadequate titles – the dialogue is stilted, and the atmosphere is decidedly stagey."

The Daily Film Renter wrote: "Love story played before background of French Revolution. The latter impresses one most as something which is happening 'off' and has no real part in the lives of the lovers, except to provide their exits and entrances. Madeleine Carroll charming and Brian Aherne has style. With cries of the mob, long shots of guillotine, escapes in night and last moment rescues a popular version of a familiar theme, despite many disappointments and crudities."
