= The School for Scandal (1930 film) =

1930 film

- Madeleine Carroll
- Directed by: Maurice Elvey
- Written by: Jean Jay
- Based on: play The School for Scandal by Richard Brinsley Sheridan
- Produced by: Maurice Elvey
- Starring: Basil Gill; Madeleine Carroll; Ian Fleming; Henry Charles Hewitt
- Cinematography: Henry Harris; Bernard Knowles
- Edited by: Thorold Dickinson
- Production company: Albion Films
- Distributed by: Paramount British Pictures
- Release date: 5 September 1930
- Running time: 76 minutes
- Country: United Kingdom
- Language: English

The School for Scandal is a lost 1930 British historical comedy film directed by Thorold Dickinson and Maurice Elvey and starring Basil Gill, Madeleine Carroll and Ian Fleming. It was written by Jean Jay. It is the first sound film adaptation of Richard Brinsley Sheridan's play The School for Scandal. It is also the only feature-length film shot using the unsuccessful Raycol colour process, and marked the screen debut of Sally Gray. The film was shot at the Elstree Studios of British International Pictures with sets designed by the art director Lawrence P. Williams. It was released as a second feature and is classified as a quota quickie.

== Preservation status ==
The British Film Institute National Archive holds a collection of stills but no film or video materials, and has placed it on the BFI 75 Most Wanted list of lost films.

== Cast ==
- Basil Gill as Sir Peter Teazle
- Madeleine Carroll as Lady Teazle
- Ian Fleming as Joseph Surface
- Henry Charles Hewitt as Charles Surface
- Edgar K. Bruce as Sir Oliver Surface
- Hayden Coffin as Sir Harry Bumper
- Hector Abbas as Moses
- Dodo Watts as Maria
- Anne Grey as Lady Sneerwell
- John Charlton as Benjamin Backbite
- Stanley Lathbury as Crabtree
- Henry Vibart as Squire Hunter
- May Agate as Mrs Candour
- Maurice Braddell as Careless
- Gibb McLaughlin as William
- Wallace Bosco as Rawley
- Sally Gray in a bit part
- Rex Harrison in a bit part
- Anna Neagle in a bit part

== Reception ==
Kine Weekly wrote: "A creditable screen version of Sheridan's comedy of manners which, though it may depart from its original in some respects, retains a lot of the wit and presents a delightful picture of the period. It is essentially a film for high-class halls. ... The atmosphere is good, and if the director has rather cramped his scenes, it must be borne in mind that dialogue is the main attraction in a comedy of manners, and this is a photographic reproduction of it rather than, a pictorially developed play."

The Daily Film Renter wrote: "Should prove fairly acceptable booking in good class halls, and may even find appreciation in some popular houses. Its 18th century atmosphere will appeal particularly to those who do not demand jazz with every picture, and at the same time fans should find dialogue and comedy comprehensible enough. That The School for Scandal makes quite a passable picture is a tribute rather to the genius of Arthur Brinsley Sheridan than to the directorial skill of Maurice Elvey. The latter, however, though a deal of the comedy has escaped in the process, has made quite a fair job of work of its translation rom stage to screen, and acted by an efficient stage cast, it retains much of the savour of the boards."

== See also ==
- List of early color feature films
