= Gaston Quiribet =

French film director and cinematographer

Gaston Quiribet (1888–1972) was a French film director, cinematographer, and writer. He worked for Hepworth Studios. He used stop motion techniques to achieve cinematographic tricks.

At the 2005 British Silent Film Festival, David Williams gave a presentation titled: Gaston Quiribet That Clever Frenchman.

== Filmography ==
=== Director ===
- A Day with the Gipsies (1906)
- Once Aboard the Lugger (1920), along with George Ames
- The Malvern Hills (1920)
- Mr. Justice Raffles (film) (1921)
- A Day with the Gypsies (ca. 1922)
- The Coveted Coat (1924)
- Fugitive Futurist: A Q-Riosity (1924)
- The Night of the Knight (1924)
- The Death Ray (1924 film), a Q-Riosity film
- The Quaint Q's (1925) Director
- Q-riosities by 'Q' (1925)
- Plots and Blots (1925)

=== Cinematographer ===
- Around Bettws-Y-Coed (1909)
- Autumn in the Forest (1909)
- Burnham Beeches (film) (1909)
- From the Woodland to the Sea (1915)
- Village and Wood (1915)
- Among the Mountains of North Wales (1915)
- A Ramble in the New Forest (1915)
