= Eda Warren =

American film editor (1903–1980)

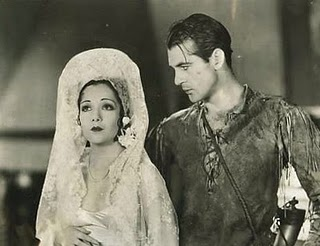
- Born: Eda A. Warren; October 17, 1903; Denver, Colorado, US
- Died: July 15, 1980 (aged 76); Los Angeles, California, US
- Years active: 1927–1968

Eda Warren (October 17, 1903 – July 15, 1980) was an American film editor. She began her Hollywood career as a secretary and started editing films in the late 1920s. Her editing career continued through 1968.

== Biography ==
Eda was born in Denver, Colorado in 1903, the daughter of Thomas Warren and Henrietta Weber. She and her older sister, Thelma, were raised in Colorado and Nebraska before the family moved west and settled in Beverly Hills, California. Eda got a job as a film editor, while Thelma worked as a stenographer at a film studio. She later became secretary of the American Cinema Editors group.

== Partial filmography ==
Eda Warren began her career as an editor.

With more than 60 film credits dating from 1927, the following were among the films with which Warren was associated:

Editor
Year	Film	Director	Notes	Other notes
1927	Evening Clothes	Luther Reed		
1927	Hula	Victor Fleming	Second collaboration with Victor Fleming	
1928	Abie's Irish Rose	Victor Fleming	Third collaboration with Victor Fleming	
1929	Wolf Song	Victor Fleming	Fourth collaboration with Victor Fleming	Uncredited
1929	Dangerous Curves	Lothar Mendes	First collaboration with Lothar Mendes	
1930	The Kibitzer	Edward Sloman		Uncredited
1930	Slightly Scarlet	Louis J. Gasnier; Edwin H. Knopf		Uncredited
1930	Ladies Love Brutes	Rowland V. Lee		
1930	The Right to Love	Richard Wallace		
1933	Luxury Liner	Lothar Mendes	Second collaboration with Lothar Mendes	Uncredited
1933	Terror Aboard	Paul Sloane		Uncredited
1933	Midnight Club	Alexander Hall; George Somnes	First collaboration with Alexander Hall and George Somnes	Uncredited
1933	Torch Singer	Alexander Hall; George Somnes	Second collaboration with Alexander Hall and George Somnes	Uncredited
1934	Ready for Love	Marion Gering		
1935	Car 99	Charles Barton		Uncredited
1935	Paris in Spring	Lewis Milestone	First collaboration with Lewis Milestone	Uncredited
1935	So Red the Rose	King Vidor		
1936	Anything Goes	Lewis Milestone	Second collaboration with Lewis Milestone	
1936	Forgotten Faces	E. A. Dupont		
1936	The General Died at Dawn	Lewis Milestone	Third collaboration with Lewis Milestone	
1937	Swing High, Swing Low	Mitchell Leisen	First collaboration with Mitchell Leisen	
1937	Mountain Music	Robert Florey	First collaboration with Robert Florey	
1937	Partners in Crime	Ralph Murphy		
1938	The Big Broadcast of 1938	Mitchell Leisen	Second collaboration with Mitchell Leisen	
1938	Booloo	Clyde E. Elliott		
1938	King of Alcatraz	Robert Florey	Second collaboration with Robert Florey	
1939	King of Chinatown	Nick Grinde		
1939	Honeymoon in Bali	Edward H. Griffith	First collaboration with Edward H. Griffith	
1940	Safari	Edward H. Griffith	Second collaboration with Edward H. Griffith	
1940	Rangers of Fortune	Sam Wood		
1941	Virginia	Edward H. Griffith	Third collaboration with Edward H. Griffith	
1941	One Night in Lisbon	Edward H. Griffith	Fourth collaboration with Edward H. Griffith	
1941	Bahama Passage	Edward H. Griffith	Fifth collaboration with Edward H. Griffith	
1942	The Lady Is Willing	Mitchell Leisen	Third collaboration with Mitchell Leisen	
1942	I Married a Witch	René Clair		
1943	Young and Willing	Edward H. Griffith	Sixth collaboration with Edward H. Griffith	
1943	China	John Farrow	First collaboration with John Farrow	
1944	And the Angels Sing	George Marshall		
1944	The Hitler Gang	John Farrow	Second collaboration with John Farrow	
1945	The Affairs of Susan	William A. Seiter	Second collaboration with William A. Seiter	
1945	You Came Along	John Farrow	Third collaboration with John Farrow	
1946	Two Years Before the Mast	John Farrow	Fourth collaboration with John Farrow	
1947	Easy Come, Easy Go	John Farrow	Sixth collaboration with John Farrow	
1950	Copper Canyon	John Farrow	Thirteenth collaboration with John Farrow	
1950	Where Danger Lives	John Farrow	Fourteenth collaboration with John Farrow	
1951	Darling, How Could You!	Mitchell Leisen	Fourth collaboration with Mitchell Leisen	
1951	His Kind of Woman	John Farrow	Fifteenth collaboration with John Farrow	
1951	Submarine Command	John Farrow	Sixteenth collaboration with John Farrow	
1952	Son of Paleface	Frank Tashlin	First collaboration with Frank Tashlin	
1953	Pony Express	Jerry Hopper	First collaboration with Jerry Hopper	
1954	Secret of the Incas	Jerry Hopper	Second collaboration with Jerry Hopper	
1955	Strategic Air Command	Anthony Mann		
1955	At Gunpoint	Alfred L. Werker		
1956	World Without End	Edward Bernds		
1956	Johnny Concho	Don McGuire		
1956	Back from Eternity	John Farrow	Seventeenth collaboration with John Farrow	
1957	The Unholy Wife	John Farrow	Eighteenth collaboration with John Farrow	
1958	St. Louis Blues	Allen Reisner		
1959	John Paul Jones	John Farrow	Nineteenth collaboration with John Farrow	
1959	The Wreck of the Mary Deare	Michael Anderson		
1960	One Foot in Hell	James B. Clark		
1961	The Young Savages	John Frankenheimer		
1962	Escape from Zahrain	Ronald Neame		
1962	Taras Bulba	J. Lee Thompson		
1964	The New Interns	John Rich		
1964	Ride the Wild Surf	Don Taylor		
1968	The Private Navy of Sgt. O'Farrell	Frank Tashlin	Second collaboration with Frank Tashlin	

Editorial department
Year	Film	Director	Role	Notes	Other notes
1927	The Rough Riders	Victor Fleming	Assistant editor	First collaboration with Victor Fleming	
1938	Three Blind Mice	William A. Seiter	Assistant cutter	First collaboration with William A. Seiter	Uncredited
1947	California	John Farrow	Editorial supervisor	Fifth collaboration with John Farrow	
1947	Blaze of Noon	John Farrow	Editorial supervisor	Seventh collaboration with John Farrow	
1948	The Big Clock	John Farrow	Editorial supervision	Eighth collaboration with John Farrow	
1948	Beyond Glory	John Farrow	Editorial supervisor	Ninth collaboration with John Farrow	
1948	Night Has a Thousand Eyes	John Farrow	Editorial supervisor	Tenth collaboration with John Farrow	
1949	Alias Nick Beal	John Farrow	Editorial supervisor	Eleventh collaboration with John Farrow	
1949	Red, Hot and Blue	John Farrow	Supervising editor	Twelfth collaboration with John Farrow	
1958	The Hot Angel	Joe Parker	Supervising film editor		

Shorts

Editor
Year	Film	Director
1948	Big Sister Blues	Alvin Ganzer
1948	Catalina Interlude	Alvin Ganzer

TV pilots

Editor
Year	Film	Director
1965	Barney	Hy Averback

TV series

Editor
Year	Title	Notes
1957	Richard Diamond, Private Detective	2 episodes
1960	Adventures in Paradise	1 episode
1963	The Twilight Zone	4 episodes
1965	Hazel	1 episode
1965−66	The Wackiest Ship in the Army	6 episodes
1966−67	Love on a Rooftop	14 episodes

== See also ==
- Women in film editing
