= Honeymoon in Bali =

1939 film by Edward H. Griffith

Honeymoon In Bali
- Directed by: Edward H. Griffith
- Written by: Virginia Van Upp (screenplay); Katharine Brush; Grace Sartwell Mason
- Produced by: Jeff Lazarus
- Starring: Fred MacMurray; Madeleine Carroll; Akim Tamiroff
- Cinematography: Ted Tetzlaff; Charles Schoenbaum
- Edited by: Eda Warren
- Distributed by: Paramount Pictures
- Release date: September 29, 1939
- Running time: 95 minutes
- Country: United States
- Language: English

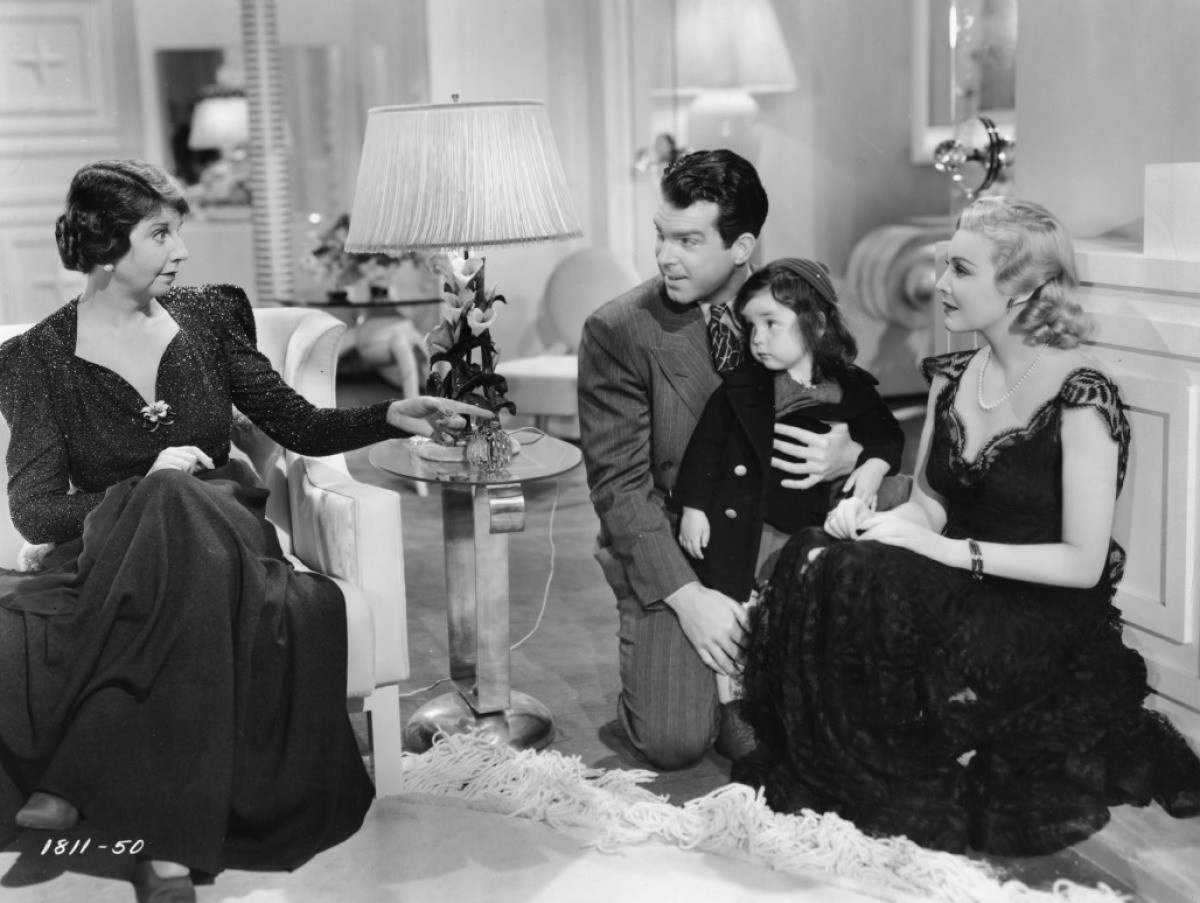
L-R: Helen Broderick, Fred MacMurray, Carolyn Lee and Madeleine Carroll

Honeymoon in Bali is a 1939 American romantic comedy film. It is also known by the alternative titles Husbands or Lovers and My Love for Yours. Virginia Van Upp's screenplay was based on the short stories "Our Miss Keane" by Grace Sartwell Mason in The Saturday Evening Post of May 24, 1923, and "Free Woman" by Katharine Brush in Redbook magazine of November–December 1936. In 1936 Paramount announced a film of Our Miss Keane to star Merle Oberon to be produced.

== Plot ==
On a rainy April afternoon in New York City, the head of a major department store, Gail Allen, meets her second cousin and best friend Lorna for afternoon tea. Her cousin, an author of love stories set in the South Seas, invites a resident fortune teller to predict Gail's future. At first the reading sounds like a hundred others, until she foresees her having a child and meeting a man whose arm was cut by a native's rice knife.

The fortune teller predicts, as Neptune is in her sign at the moment, she could find herself walking down a street and taking an unexpected turn where things would change. Thinking that her career will come first, Gail does not like her predicted future but finds herself taking an unexpected turn that takes her into a shop that sells sailboats. There she meets Bill Burnett, who lives in Bali, and is holidaying in New York. Beginning with Bill's injury from a native's rice knife, all of the predictions eventually come to pass.

Burnett has adopted a little girl, Rosie (Carolyn Lee) whom Gail takes an immediate liking to, if not her father.

She also receives unsolicited advice from a philosophical window washer (Akim Tamiroff).

== Cast ==
- Fred MacMurray as Bill "Willie" Burnett
- Madeleine Carroll as Gail Allen
- Allan Jones as Eric Sinclair
- Akim Tamiroff as Tony, the window washer
- Helen Broderick as Lorna "Smitty" Smith
- Osa Massen as Noel Van Ness
- Carolyn Lee as Rosie
- Astrid Allwyn as Fortune Teller
- Georgia Caine as Miss Stone, Gail's secretary
- John Qualen as Meek Man
- Fritzi Brunette as Secretary
- William B. Davidson as Store Detective
- Benny Bartlett as Jack, the singing telegram boy
- Charles Lane as Photographer (uncredited)
- Monty Woolley as Parker, Lorna's publisher (uncredited)

== Reception ==
A review from The Washington Post, on October 5, 1939, says "'Honeymoon in Bali' Is Delightfully Easy To Take!" The Los Angeles Times review from October 13, 1939, says "'Honeymoon in Bali' Light, Romantic Comedy."

== Alternate names ==
- Are Husbands Necessary? (working title; later used by Paramount for an unrelated 1942 comedy with Ray Milland and Betty Field)
- Husbands or Lovers (UK)
- My Love for Yours (video title)

== Quotes ==
"There's not a wall between freedom and loneliness, you can fall into it without warning" - Lorna
