= Not So Stupid =

Not So Stupid may refer to:

- Not So Stupid (1928 film), a 1928 French silent comedy film
- Not So Stupid (1946 film), a 1946 French comedy film
