= Evan Thomas (actor) =

British actor (1891–1982)

- in North West Mounted Police (1940)
- Born: Elystan Owen Evan Thomas; 17 February 1891; Vancouver, British Columbia, Canada
- Died: 1982; Kent, England, UK
- Occupation: Actor
- Years active: 1916–1965

Evan Thomas (February 17, 1891 – 13 July, 1982), also known as Peter Evan Thomas, was a Canadian-born British character actor, whose career spanned both the silent and sound film eras. He began his career in England, in Lady Windermere's Fan, written by Oscar Wilde.

== Family life ==
Born Elystan Owen Evan Thomas on 17 February 1891 in Vancouver, where his father, Owen Grant Evan Thomas (1861)-1942) was the manager of the Opera House until 1896. The family were in England by the time of the 1911 census, but his parents' marriage ended shortly afterwards, and his father remarried twice. On 27 November 1922 at St Martin-in-the-Fields, Elystan married Sylvia Ward (div. 1940), at a time when they were both appearing in plays in London theatres. The bride was the daughter of the famous caricaturist Sir Leslie Ward (1851-1922).

== Career ==
Elystan appeared in silent films in Great Britain and beginning in 1930 worked in both Hollywood and England, before returning permanently to the British film industry after 1946. Over his fifty-year career, he would appear in dozens of films, usually in small roles, although he did have several featured performances, as in 1928's Warned Off, and 1935's Lend Me Your Husband. He died on 13 July 1982 at Tunbridge Wells.

== Filmography ==
(Per AFI and BFI databases)

- Lady Windermere's Fan (1916)
- Wisp o' The Woods (1919)
- The Starting Point (1919)
- Once Aboard the Lugger (1920)
- The Constant Nymph (1928)
- Warned Off (1928)
- Inside the Lines (1930)
- Women Who Play (1932)
- Tin Gods (1932)
- The Girl from Maxim's (1933)
- Mrs. Dane's Defence (1933)
- Ask Beccles (1934)
- The Scarlet Pimpernel (1934)
- Lend Me Your Husband (1935)
- Spy of Napoleon (1936)
- Knight Without Armour (1937)
- The High Command (1937)
- O.H.M.S. (1937)
- For Valour (1937)
- The Buccaneer (1938)
- Bulldog Drummond in Africa (1938)
- Bulldog Drummond's Peril (1938)
- Arrest Bulldog Drummond (1938)
- Kidnapped (1938)
- If I Were King (1938)
- Lord Jeff (1938)
- The Little Princess (1939)
- The Hound of the Baskervilles (1939)
- North West Mounted Police (1940)
- British Intelligence (1940)
- The Blonde from Singapore (1941)
- One Night in Lisbon (1941)
- The Royal Mounted Patrol (1941)
- They Met in Bombay (1941)
- A Yank in the R.A.F. (1941)
- Drums of Fu Manchu (1943)
- First Comes Courage (1943)
- The Man from Down Under (1943)
- Two Tickets to London (1943)
- Appointment in Berlin (1943)
- Frenchman's Creek (1944)
- Our Hearts Were Young and Gay (1944)
- The Uninvited (1944)
- Diamond Horseshoe (1945)
- My Name Is Julia Ross (1945)
- The Picture of Dorian Gray (1945)
- Kitty (1946)
- Rendezvous 24 (1946)
- Sweetheart of Sigma Chi (1946)
- Tomorrow Is Forever (1946)
- Children Galore (1954)
- Vanishing Act (1962)
- The Sporting Chance (1964)
- Women in Crisis My Grandmother (1964)
- Whatever Happened to George Foster? (1965)
