= The Princess and the Pirate =

1944 film by Samuel Goldwyn, Allen Boretz, Sidney Lanfield, David Butler

- Theatrical release poster
- Directed by: David Butler
- Written by: Allen Boretz (adaptation); Curtis Kenyon (adaptation)
- Screenplay by: Everett Freeman; Don Hartman; Melville Shavelson
- Story by: Sy Bartlett
- Produced by: Samuel Goldwyn
- Starring: Bob Hope; Virginia Mayo
- Cinematography: Victor Milner; William E. Snyder
- Edited by: Daniel Mandell
- Music by: Score: David Rose; Songs: Jimmy McHugh (music); Harold Adamson (lyrics)
- Color process: Technicolor
- Production company: Samuel Goldwyn Productions
- Distributed by: RKO Radio Pictures
- Release date: November 17, 1944 (USA)
- Running time: 94 minutes
- Country: United States
- Language: English (Note: The princess reads a negative newspaper review of one of Sylvester's performances aloud from the Leningrad Tattler in Russian.)
- Box office: $3,500,000

The Princess and the Pirate is a 1944 American comedy film directed by David Butler, and starring Bob Hope and Virginia Mayo. Based on a story by Sy Bartlett, the film is about a princess who travels incognito to elope with her true love instead of marrying the man to whom she is betrothed. On the high seas, her ship is attacked by pirates who plan to kidnap her and hold her for ransom, unaware that she will be rescued by the unlikeliest of knights errant. Produced by Samuel Goldwyn, The Princess and the Pirate received Academy Award nominations for Best Art Direction and Best Music Score.

== Plot ==
A pirate captain known as the Hook (Victor McLaglen) buries his treasure on an island and kills the map maker so no one else will find it. He and his cut-throat crew go after the Mary Ann, a ship on which Princess Margaret (Virginia Mayo) is running away from her father, the King (Robert Warwick), in order to marry a commoner. The Hook plans to hold her for a large ransom. A cowardly actor, Sylvester the Great (Bob Hope), is in the cabin next door to Margaret. The Hook's ship, The Avenger attacks the Mary Ann and after a big fight, the crew are killed or made to walk the plank by the pirates. Sylvester escapes by disguising himself as a gypsy woman and is taken on board The Avenger with Margaret.

The Ship's aged tattooist, Featherhead (Walter Brennan) has taken a fancy to the gypsy which is all that saves the disguised Sylvester. It turns out that he guessed the gypsy was a man and involves Sylvester in his plot to get the Hook's treasure for himself. He gives him the treasure map and helps Sylvester and Margaret escape in a boat. They are to pass the stolen map to Featherhead's cousin on the pirate island of Casarouge. The couple make it to the island which is extremely bloodthirsty. The couple check in at the Boar's Head Inn where they are to meet the cousin (who at present is not on the island) and do an act at the Bucket of Blood to get some money to pay for their stay.

Margaret is kidnapped and Sylvester goes to the Governor (La Roche) (Walter Slezak) to complain only to find out he was the kidnapper. La Roche has recognized Princess Margaret and plans on holding her for a million doubloon ransom. He stops Sylvester from leaving, planning to ransom him for 100,000 doubloons, sure that the King will want to hang him. Sylvester is well looked after and helps Margaret who is on a hunger strike. The Hook is in with La Roche and they threaten nasty things for the possessor of the map. Featherhead turns up under Sylvester's bed and knocks out Sylvester who wants to destroy the map to save his skin. Featherhead tattoos the map on the chest of the unconscious Sylvester and when he recovers, they both eat it.

After a meeting, the Hook guesses Sylvester is the gypsy who stole the map and returns to the Governor's house to kill him. The Governor sees the map on Sylvester's chest as the Hook arrives. The Hook chases him but is stopped from killing Sylvester by Featherhead who shoots him. As he has not returned, Pedro (Marc Lawrence), the Hook's second-in-command leads a raid on the Governor's house to rescue the Hook and after a big fight, inadvertently rescues Sylvester who has disguised himself as the Hook, along with Margaret.

Back on The Avenger, Sylvester as the Hook starts giving orders, not knowing that the real Hook has just been grazed by the bullet and is now also on the ship. Contradictory orders flow from the two different Hooks at different times, till Sylvester is unmasked. In chains and ready to kill themselves, The Avenger is attacked and they believe it is La Roche. It however turns out to be the King's ship and both are released (La Roche has been captured and has revealed all). The King says he is not going to stand in Margaret's way if she wants to marry a commoner and she rushes forwards. Sylvester is shocked as she passes him and into the arms of another man, Bing Crosby, who is playing a sailor. Indignantly, Sylvester says; "That is the last picture I do for Goldwyn" (which it was).

== Cast ==
- Bob Hope as Sylvester Crosby
- Virginia Mayo as Margaret Warbrook (singing voice was dubbed by Louanne Hogan)
- Walter Brennan as Featherhead
- Walter Slezak as La Roche
- Victor McLaglen as Captain Barrett AKA The Hook
- Marc Lawrence as Pedro
- Hugo Haas as Proprietor (Bucket of Blood)
- Maude Eburne as Landlady
- Adia Kuznetzoff as Don José
- Brandon Hurst as Mr Pelly
- Tom Kennedy as Alonzo
- Stanley Andrews as Captain of "Mary Ann"
- Robert Warwick as The King
- Bing Crosby as Commoner on the King's ship
- Francis Ford as Drunken Pirate (uncredited)
- Rondo Hatton as Gorilla (uncredited)
- Mike Mazurki as Pirate (uncredited)
- Edward Peil Sr. as Palace Guard (uncredited)
- James Flavin as Naval Officer (uncredited)

== Production ==
At the beginning of the film, Bob Hope breaks the fourth wall when he appears in costume over the titles to explain to the "folks" that he will not be playing the "bloodthirsty buccaneer ... his soul ... black with foul deeds", but rather the coward who appears later on. Mary Grant designed the film's costumes.

== Award nominations ==
David Rose was nominated for the Academy Award for Best Score, while Ernst Fegté and Howard Bristol were nominated for Best Art Direction.

== Home media ==
In 1985, The Princess and the Pirate was released on VHS, Betamax, and Laserdisc by Embassy Home Entertainment. In 2005, it was released on DVD by MGM Home Entertainment.
