= Madeleine Carroll =

English actress (1906–1987)

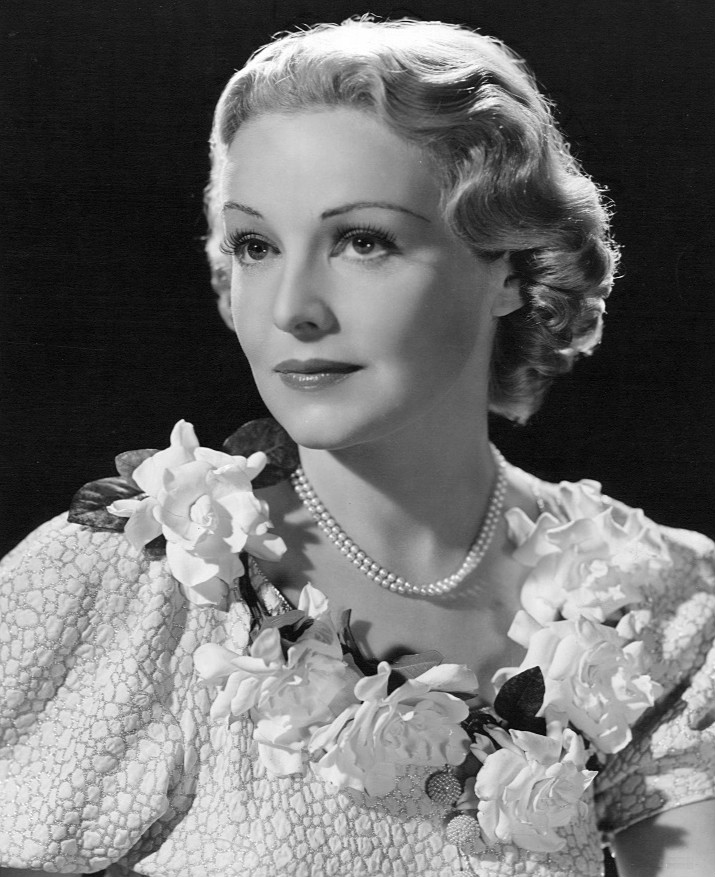
- Carroll in 1938
- Born: Edith Madeleine Carroll; 26 February 1906; West Bromwich, Staffordshire, England
- Died: 2 October 1987 (aged 81); Marbella, Spain
- Resting place: Sant Antoni de Calonge
- Education: University of Birmingham
- Occupation: Actress
- Years active: 1928–1955
- Spouses: Captain Phillip Astley (m. 1931; div. 1939) Sterling Hayden (m. 1942; div. 1946) Henri Lavorel (m. 1946; div. 1949) Andrew Heiskell (m. 1950; div. 1965)
- Children: 1
- Awards: Legion of Honour (1946)

Edith Madeleine Carroll (26 February 1906 – 2 October 1987) was an English actress, popular both in Britain and in America in the 1930s and 1940s. At the peak of her success in 1938, she was the world's highest-paid actress.

Carroll is best known for starring in Alfred Hitchcock's The 39 Steps (1935) where she originated the "ice cold blonde" role in Hitchcock films. The director stated, "how very well Madeleine fitted into the part. I had heard a lot about her as a tall, cold, blonde beauty. After meeting her, I made up my mind to present her to the public as her natural self". She played another Hitchcock blonde in Secret Agent (1936). She is also noted for largely abandoning her acting career after the death of her sister Marguerite in the London Blitz to devote herself to helping wounded servicemen and children displaced or maimed by the war. She was awarded both the Legion d'Honneur and the Medal of Freedom for her work with the Red Cross.

== Early life ==
Carroll was born at 32 Herbert Street (now number 44) in West Bromwich, Staffordshire, daughter of John O'Carroll, an Irish professor of languages from County Limerick, and Helene, his French wife. She graduated from the University of Birmingham, with a B.A. degree in languages. While at university she appeared in some productions for the Birmingham University Dramatic Society. She was a French mistress at a girls' school in Hove for a year.

== Acting career ==
=== Early years ===
Carroll's father opposed her taking up acting, but with her mother's support she quit teaching and traveled to London to look for stage work. She had won a beauty contest, and got a job in Seymour Hicks' touring company, making her stage debut in 1927 in The Lash. The following year she made her screen debut in The Guns of Loos, and then starred alongside Miles Mander in The First Born, written by Alma Reville. Thence she met Reville's husband, Alfred Hitchcock.

=== Film stardom ===
Carroll was the lead in her second film, What Money Can Buy (1928) with Humberston Wright. She followed it with The First Born (1928) with Miles Mander, which really established her in films. Carroll went to France to make Not So Stupid (1928). Back in Britain she starred in The Crooked Billet (1929) and The American Prisoner (1929), both shot in silent and sound versions. In 1930, she starred in Atlantic, then co-starred with Brian Aherne in The W Plan (1930). In France she was in Instinct (1930). On stage, Carroll appeared in The Roof (1929) for Basil Dean, The Constant Nymph, Mr Pickwick (opposite Charles Laughton) and an adaptation of Beau Geste.

The same year, Carroll starred in the controversial Young Woodley (1930), followed by a farce, French Leave (1930). She had a support role in an early adaptation of Escape (1930) and was the female lead in The School for Scandal (1930) and Kissing Cup's Race (1930). Carroll starred as a French aristocrat in Madame Guillotine (1931) with Aherne, then did another with Mander, Fascination (1931). She was in The Written Law (1931), then signed a contract with Gaumont British for whom she made Sleeping Car (1932) with Ivor Novello.

She had a big hit with I Was a Spy (1933), which won her an award as best actress of the year. It was directed by Victor Saville. Carroll played the title role in the play Little Catherine. Abruptly, she announced plans to retire from films to devote herself to a private life with her husband, the first of four. Carroll went to Hollywood to appear in The World Moves On (1934) for Fox; John Ford directed and Franchot Tone co starred. Back in England she was in The Dictator (1935) for Saville, playing Caroline Matilda of Great Britain.

=== Work for Hitchcock ===
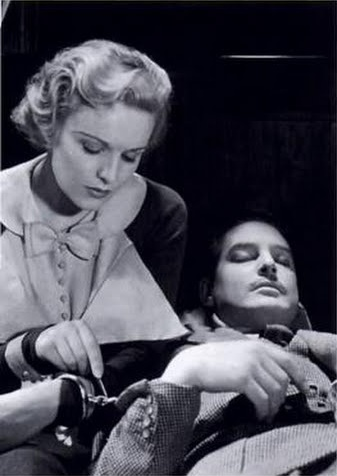
Carroll and Robert Donat in The 39 Steps (1935)

Carroll attracted the attention of Alfred Hitchcock and in 1935 starred as the director's earliest prototypical cool, glib, intelligent blonde in The 39 Steps. Based on the espionage novel by John Buchan, the film became a sensation and with it so did Carroll. Cited by The New York Times for a performance that was "charming and skillful", Carroll became very much in demand. Of Hitchcock heroines as exemplified by Carroll, film critic Roger Ebert wrote:

The female characters in his films reflected the same qualities over and over again: They were blonde. They were icy and remote. They were imprisoned in costumes that subtly combined fashion with fetishism. They mesmerised the men, who often had physical or psychological handicaps. Sooner or later, every Hitchcock woman was humiliated.

The filmmaker and actor Orson Welles called the film a "masterpiece" and screenwriter Robert Towne remarked, "It's not much of an exaggeration to say that all contemporary escapist entertainment begins with The 39 Steps." At the end of the century it was ranked fourth in the BFI Top 100 British films. Following on from this success Hitchcock wanted to re-team Carroll with her 39 Steps co-star Robert Donat the following year in Secret Agent, a spy thriller based on a work by W. Somerset Maugham. However, Donat's recurring health problems intervened, resulting in a Carroll–John Gielgud pairing. In between the films she made a short drama The Story of Papworth (1935).

=== Hollywood ===
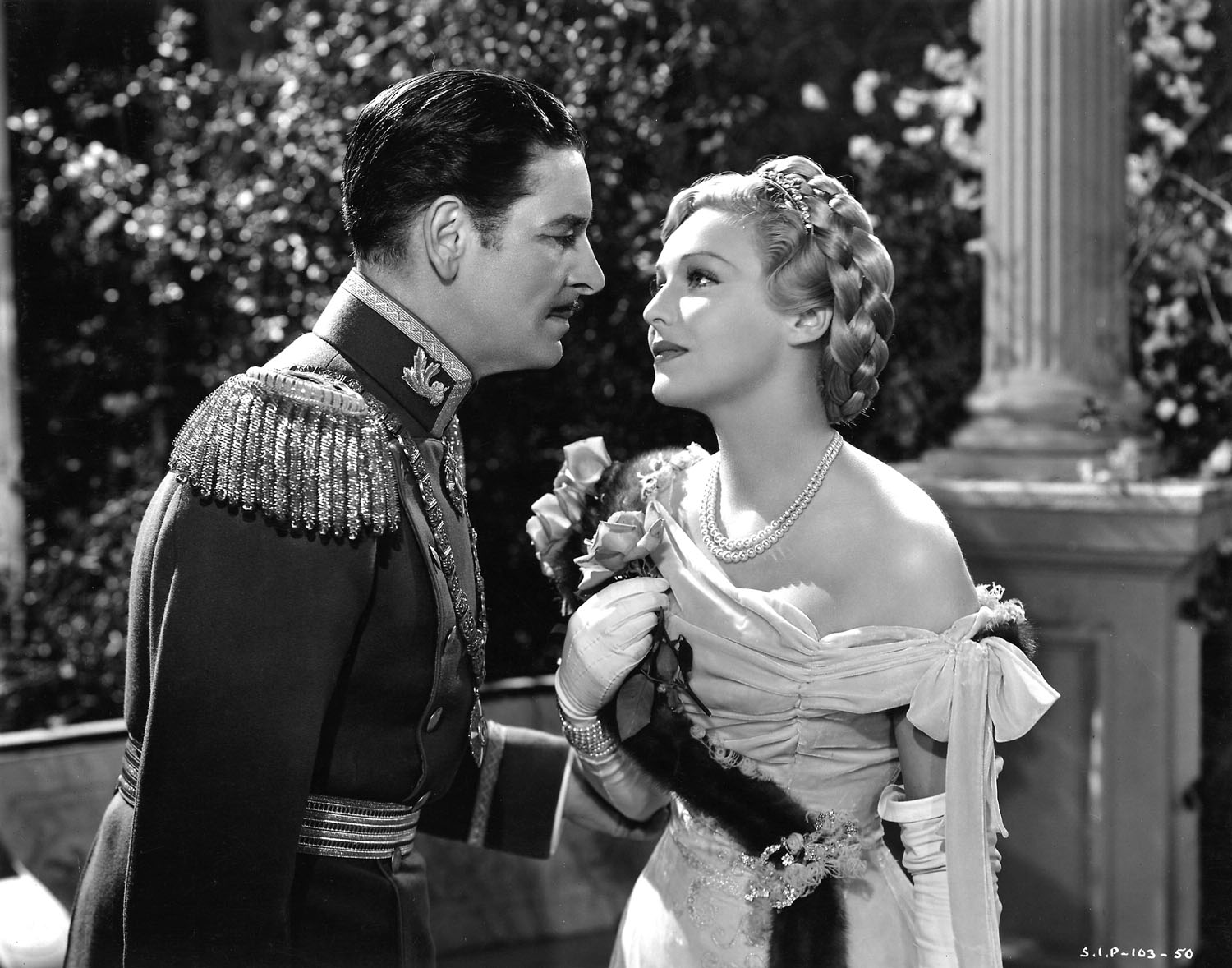
Ronald Colman and Madeleine Carroll in The Prisoner of Zenda, 1937

Achieving international stardom with The 39 Steps, Carroll was the first British beauty to be offered a major American film contract. She accepted a lucrative deal with Paramount Pictures and was cast opposite George Brent in The Case Against Mrs. Ames (1936). She followed this with The General Died at Dawn (1936), and was borrowed by 20th Century Fox to play the female lead in Lloyd's of London (1936) which made a star of Tyrone Power. She stayed at the studio to make On the Avenue (1937), a musical with Dick Powell and Alice Faye.

Carroll went to Columbia for It's All Yours (1937) then was cast by David O. Selznick as Ronald Colman's love interest in the 1937 box-office success The Prisoner of Zenda. Walter Wanger put her in Blockade (1938) with Henry Fonda, about the Spanish Civil War. Back at Paramount she made some comedies with Fred MacMurray, Cafe Society (1939) and Honeymoon in Bali (1939). Edward Small gave her top billing in My Son, My Son! (1940) with Aherne.

She starred in Safari (1940) then played against Gary Cooper in North West Mounted Police (1940), directed by Cecil B. DeMille. Paramount put Carroll opposite MacMurray in Virginia (1941) and One Night in Lisbon (1941). Virginia also starred Sterling Hayden who was reteamed with Carroll in Bahama Passage (1941). Carroll was Bob Hope's love interest in My Favorite Blonde (1942).

=== Radio and theatre ===
On radio, Carroll was a participant in The Circle (1939) on NBC, discussing "current events, literature and drama" each week. In 1944, she was the host of This Is the Story, an anthology series dramatising famous novels on the Mutual Broadcasting System. At the tail end of radio's golden age, Carroll starred in the NBC soap opera The Affairs of Dr. Gentry (1957–59). She also was one of a group of four stars who rotated in taking the lead in each week's episode of The NBC Radio Theater (1959).

In 1948 she made her debut on Broadway as Agatha Reed in Fay Kanin's Goodbye, My Fancy; a role later portrayed by Joan Crawford in the 1951 film adaptation.

=== Return to Britain ===
Carroll returned to Britain after the war. She was in White Cradle Inn (1947). She went back to the US and was reunited with MacMurray for An Innocent Affair (1948). Her last film was The Fan (1949).

== Awards ==
In 1946, Carroll was awarded France's Legion of Honour for her overseas work, during World War II, liaising between the forces of the United States Army and the French Resistance, and her post-war fostering of amity between France and the United States.

For her contributions to the film industry, Carroll was inducted into the Hollywood Walk of Fame in 1960 with a motion pictures star located at 6707 Hollywood Boulevard.

A commemorative monument and plaques were unveiled in her birthplace, West Bromwich, to mark the centenary of her birth. At the height of her success, she gave up her acting career during World War II to work in the line of fire on troop trains for the Red Cross in Italy after her sister was killed in a German air raid. She was later awarded the American Medal of Freedom for her service.

== Personal life ==
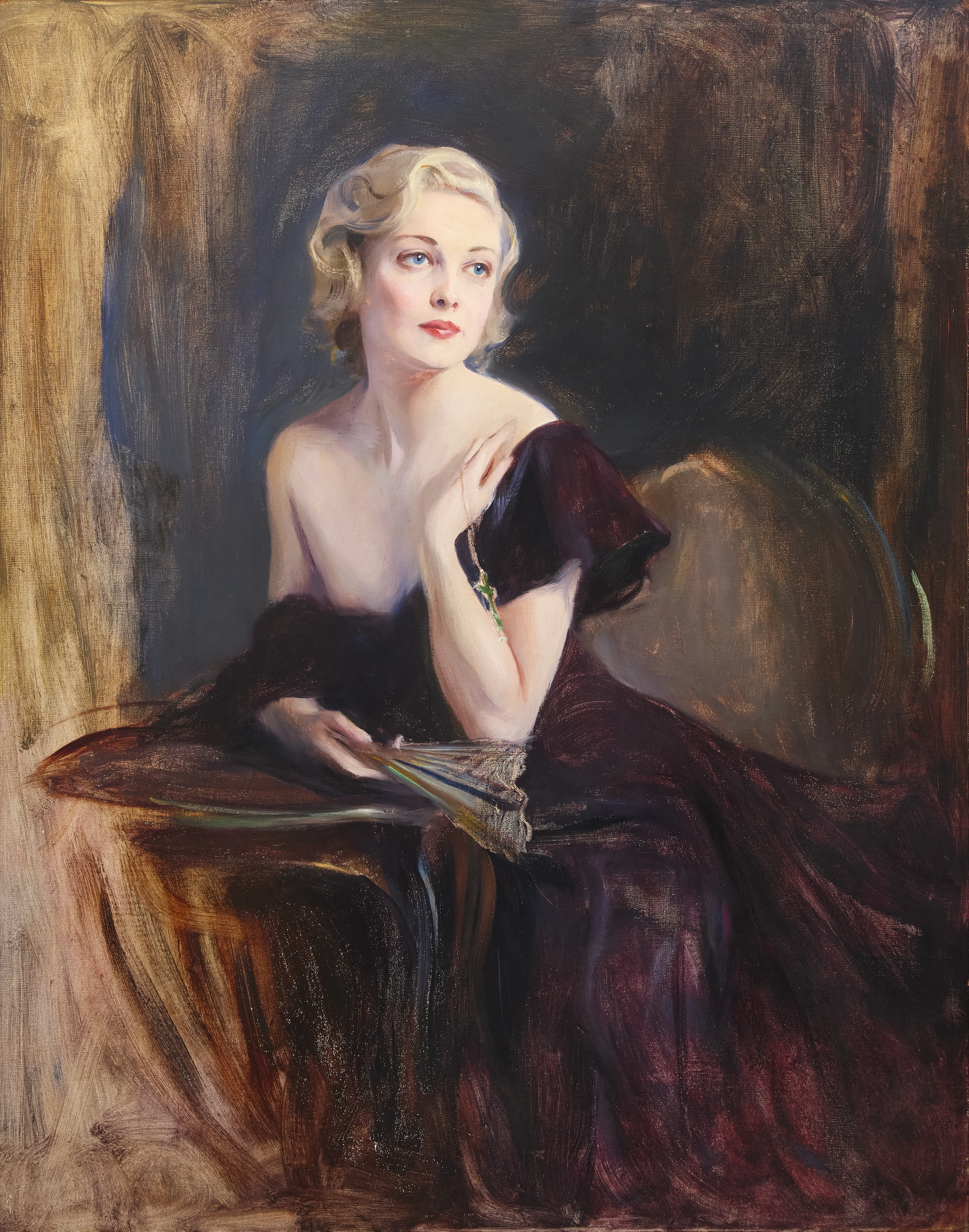
Mrs Philip Astley, née Madeleine Carroll by Philip Alexius de László (oil on canvas, circa 1935); one of at least two portraits of Carroll by de László

Carroll married her first husband, Colonel Philip Reginald Astley, in 1931; they divorced in 1939. He was an estate agent, big-game hunter and soldier. In 1941, she starred opposite Sterling Hayden in Virginia. The following year they married, divorcing in 1946. After her only sister, Marguerite, was killed in World War II's London Blitz, Carroll made a radical shift from acting to working in field hospitals as a Red Cross nurse. Having become a naturalised American citizen in 1943, she served at the American Army Air Force's 61st Station Hospital in Foggia, Italy, in 1944, where wounded airmen flying out of air bases in the area were hospitalised. She earned the rank of captain and received the Medal of Freedom for her nursing service.

Carroll first visited Spain's Costa Brava in 1934. The following year she bought an estate in Calonge, where her seaside home, Castell Madeleine, was constructed. She was prevented from living there by the Spanish Civil War and World War II and moved to Marbella in 1949. The home was later demolished, leaving one tower intact, and a housing development named after it (Urbanización Castell Madeleine).

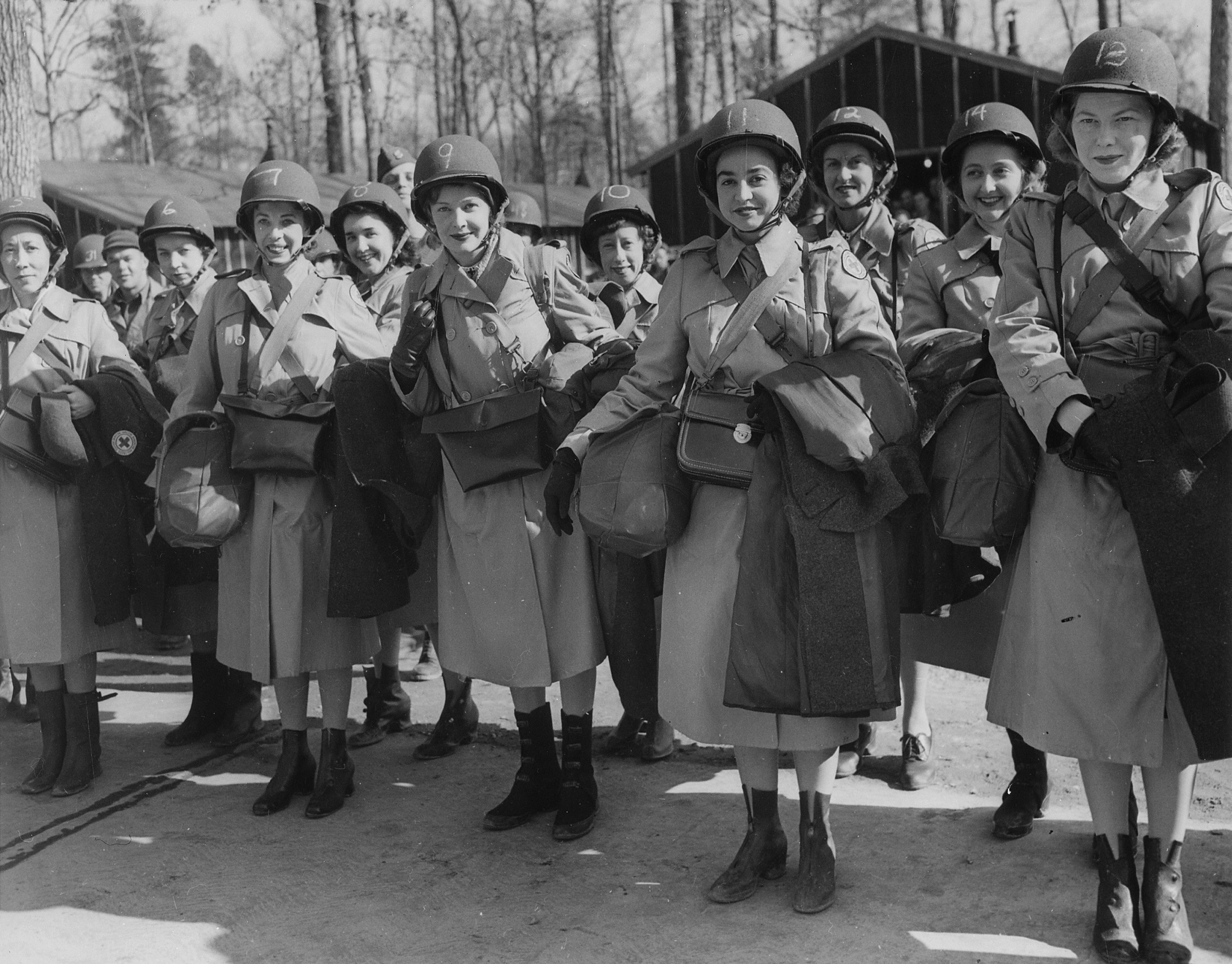
Red Cross workers assembled at the IP, Avenue C and 7th Street, Camp Patrick Henry, left to right, front row, are Edna Elizabeth Dick of Williamsburg, Kentucky; Madeleine Carroll; Marcia Hinrichs, Alexandria, Virginia.

During the war, Carroll donated another property of hers, a château she owned outside Paris, to house more than one hundred and fifty orphans, arranging for groups of young people in California to knit clothing for them. In an RKO-Pathe News bulletin she was filmed at the château with children and staff wearing the donated clothes thanking those who contributed. She was awarded the Légion d'Honneur for her efforts by France. Allied Commander Dwight Eisenhower remarked in private that, of all the movie stars he met in Europe during the war, he was most impressed with Carroll and Herbert Marshall (who worked with military amputees).

After the war, Carroll stayed in Europe where she conducted a radio program fostering French-American friendship and helped in the rehabilitation of concentration camp victims, during which she met her future third husband, the French producer Henri Lavorel. In late 1946, she went briefly to Switzerland to film a British film, White Cradle Inn (aka High Fury).

On her return to Paris, she and Lavorel formed a production company and made several two-reel documentaries to promote peace, one of which, Children's Republic, was shown at the Cannes Film Festival. Carroll told The Christian Science Monitor that "wars are started at the top but can be prevented at the bottom, if all men and women will rid themselves of distrust and suspicion of that which is foreign." Filmed in a small orphanage in the town of Sèvres, just southwest of Paris, it focused attention on the devastation of children's lives in Europe caused by war. Widely shown in Canada, it became a prime source of funds for the manufacture of artificial limbs for wounded children.

In 1947, Carroll returned to the United States together with Lavorel. Their intention was for her to resume her acting career, which would fund their production company, but they soon separated. Appearing in three more films until 1949 and debuting on Broadway in 1948, Carroll then mostly retired from acting, although she did occasionally appear on television and radio until the mid-1960s.

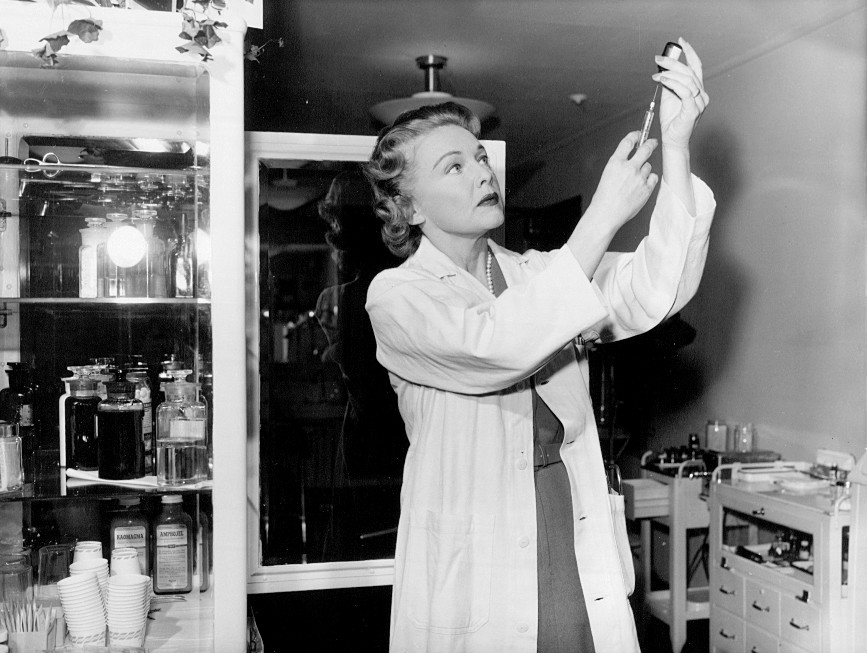
Carroll starred in a radio daytime drama, The Affairs of Dr. Gentry, from 1957 to 1959.

She married Andrew Heiskell, publisher of Life, in 1950, and they had a daughter Anne Madeleine in 1951. They divorced in 1965. By then, Carroll had moved to Paris. She later moved to Spain, where she shared an estate with her mother and her daughter. Her mother died in 1975 and her daughter, having relocated to New York, died in 1983.

== Death ==
Carroll died on 2 October 1987, aged 81, in Marbella, Spain, from pancreatic cancer and is buried in the cemetery of Sant Antoni de Calonge in Catalonia.

== Filmography ==
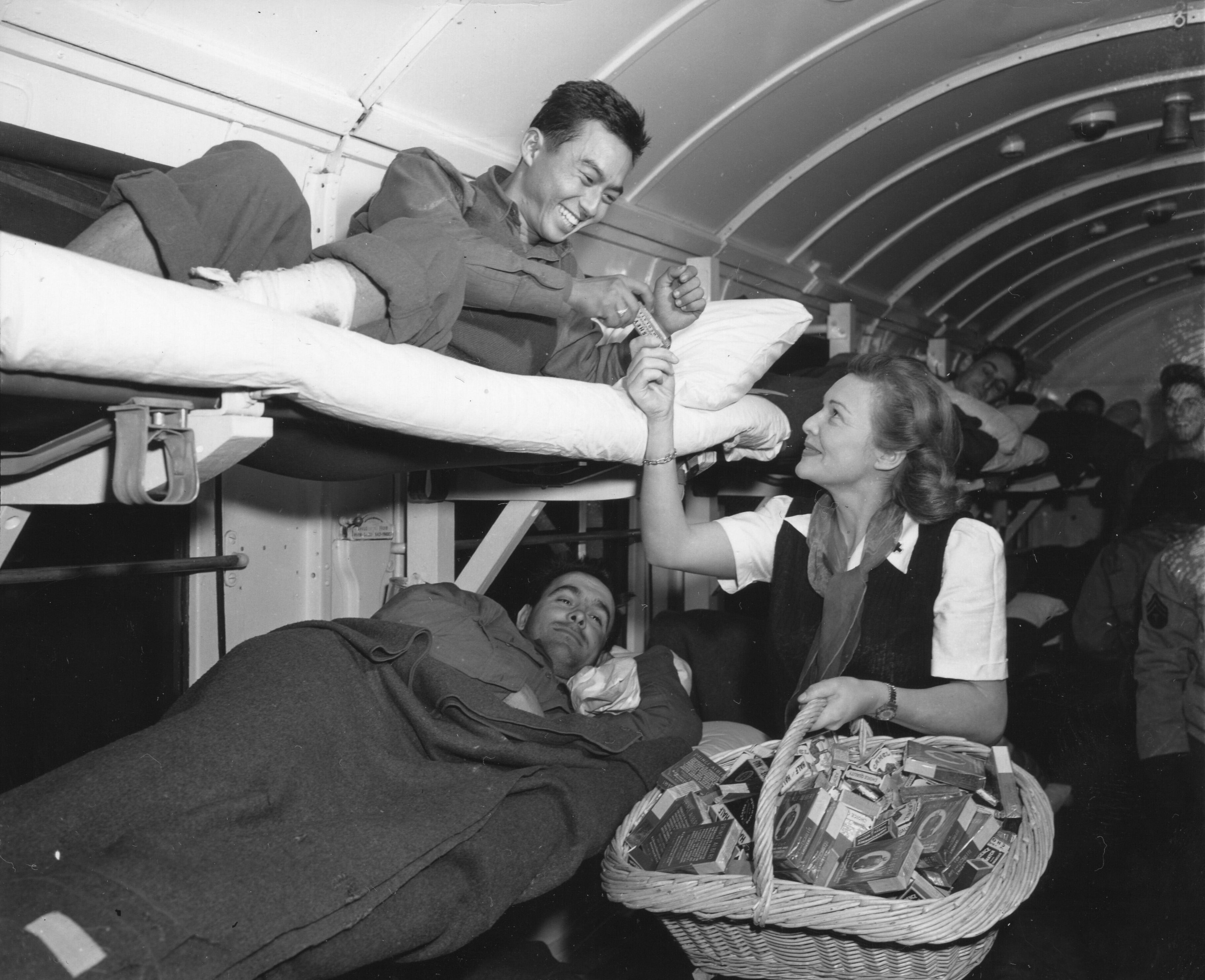
PFC Hiroshi Suyao, of Honolulu, a Japanese American soldier, wounded during an attack, receives cigarettes from Carroll. Seventh Army, Dompaire area, France. 1 November 1944. 66th Hospital Train.

Year	Title	Role	Notes
1928	The Guns of Loos	Diana Cheswick	
1928	What Money Can Buy	Rhoda Pearson	
1928	The First Born	Lady Madeleine Boycott	
1928	Not So Stupid		
1929	The Crooked Billet	Joan Easton	
1929	The American Prisoner	Grace Malherb	
1929	Atlantic	Monica	
1930	The W Plan	Rosa Hartmann	
1930	Instinct		
1930	Young Woodley	Laura Simmons	
1930	French Leave	Mlle. Juliette / Dorothy Glenister	
1930	Escape	Dora	
1930	The School for Scandal	Lady Teazle	
1930	Kissing Cup's Race	Lady Molly Adair	
1931	Madame Guillotine	Lucille de Choisigne	
1931	Fascination	Gwenda Farrell	
1931	The Written Law	Lady Margaret Rochester	
1933	Sleeping Car	Anne	
1933	I Was a Spy	Martha Cnockhaert	
1934	The World Moves On	Mrs. Warburton, 1825 / Mary Warburton Girard, 1914	
1935	The Dictator	Queen Caroline Mathilde of Denmark	
1935	The 39 Steps	Pamela	
1935	The Story of Papworth, the Village of Hope	The Introducer	Short Subject
1936	Secret Agent	Elsa Carrington	
1936	The Case Against Mrs. Ames	Hope Ames	
1936	The General Died at Dawn	Judy Perrie	
1936	Lloyd's of London	Lady Elizabeth	
1937	On the Avenue	Mimi Caraway	
1937	It's All Yours	Linda Gray	
1937	The Prisoner of Zenda	Princess Flavia	
1938	Blockade	Norma	
1939	Cafe Society	Christopher West	
1939	Honeymoon in Bali	Gail Allen	
1940	My Son, My Son!	Livia Vaynol	
1940	Safari	Linda Stewart	
1940	Northwest Mounted Police	April Logan	
1941	Virginia	Charlotte Dunterry	
1941	One Night in Lisbon	Leonora Perrycoate	
1941	Bahama Passage	Carol Delbridge	
1942	My Favorite Blonde	Karen Bentley	
1947	White Cradle Inn	Magda	
1948	An Innocent Affair	Paula Doane	
1949	The Fan	Mrs. Erlynne	

== Radio appearances ==
Year	Program	Episode/source
1937	Lux Radio Theater	"Beloved Enemy"
1938	Lux Radio Theater	"Romance"
1938	Lux Radio Theater	"Dangerous"
1938	Lux Radio Theater	"Another Dawn"
1939	The Campbell Playhouse	"The Green Goddess"
1939	Lux Radio Theater	"Invitation to Happiness"
1940	Lux Radio Theater	"My Son, My Son!"
1940	The Campbell Playhouse	"Jane Eyre"
1941	Philip Morris Playhouse	"My Favorite Wife"
1942	Philip Morris Playhouse	"Vivacious Lady"
1947	Lux Radio Theater	"The Ghost and Mrs. Muir"
