= Darby Jones =

American actor (1910–86)

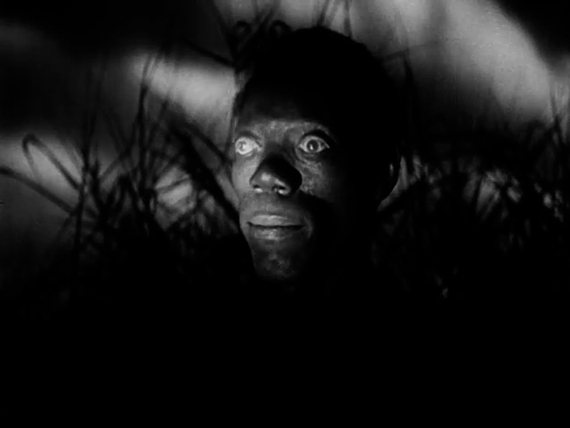
- Jones as Carrefour in I Walked with a Zombie (1943)
- Born: February 10, 1910; Los Angeles, California
- Died: November 30, 1986 (aged 76); Los Angeles, California
- Occupation: Actor
- Years active: 1933–1957

Darby Jones (February 10, 1910 – November 30, 1986) was an American actor known for his role as the zombie-like Carrefour in the 1943 horror film I Walked with a Zombie. He appeared in a similar role in the 1945 film Zombies on Broadway. He had uncredited appearances in the 1937 films Swing High, Swing Low and A Day at the Races, and his other roles include Broken Strings (1940), Virginia (1941), White Cargo (1942), and Zamba (1949). Jones also appeared in several Tarzan films, including the 1933 film serial Tarzan the Fearless, and the films Tarzan Escapes (1936) and Tarzan's New York Adventure (1942).

In 1991, film critic Danny Peary characterized Jones as having been "even more typecast than the typical black actor," relegated to roles in "jungle pictures." Jones's portrayal of Carrefour in I Walked with a Zombie has received praise and analysis, and has been described as iconic.

== Early life ==
A native of Los Angeles, Jones broke the Los Angeles high jump record in 1929 at 6 feet 2.3125 inches (1.887538 m) while at Polytechnic High School.

== Career ==
=== Early films ===
Jones made his acting debut in the 1933 film serial Tarzan the Fearless, in an uncredited role as the Head Bearer. In 1936, he appeared as Bomba in the film Tarzan Escapes. In 1937, he appeared in the romantic comedy film Swing High, Swing Low as a black Santa Claus lounging in a Panama café. That same year, he was a background extra in the Marx Brothers film A Day at the Races, appearing as a trumpet player during the "All God's Chillun Got Rhythm" number in the film.

In 1940, Jones played a yokel named Stringbeans Johnson in the film Broken Strings. In one scene, he dances to swing music at a nightclub, executing four midair splits among other dance moves. The following year, Jones appeared in Virginia as Joseph, a loyal servant on a plantation. In 1942, Jones appeared in Tarzan's New York Adventure in an uncredited role as a Swahili chief, and in White Cargo in a credited role as an obedient houseboy named Darby.

=== I Walked with a Zombie ===
In 1943, Jones appeared as the zombie-like Carrefour in horror film I Walked with a Zombie, directed by Jacques Tourneur and produced by Val Lewton. It is one of Jones's best-known roles, described as recognizable to fans of horror films. Historian and author Alexander Nemerov referred to Jones's portrayal of Carrefour as being a "monumental [...] dominant screen presence" in the film, which takes place on a Caribbean island called Saint Sebastian, home to a sugar plantation, a small white community, and descendants of African slaves, some of whom practice voodoo. Nemerov calls Carrefour a "disturbing figure—a sign of slavery past and present and of threats in the future." He characterizes Carrefour's image as "conjur[ing] the lynching of a black man", and writes that the character "suggests the violent subjugation and the emergent power of blacks" during World War II. As such, Nemerov called Jones "a minor actor granted extraordinary importance in a Lewton film". In 2019, Jim Vorel of Paste referred to Carrefour's "bug-eyed zombie visage" as "iconic [...] the kind of image that must have haunted the dreams of patrons for years to come".

The same year that I Walked with a Zombie was released, Jones appeared in two uncredited roles: a bellhop in Passport to Suez, and a cannibal in Sleepy Lagoon.

=== Later films ===
Two years after his appearance as Carrefour in I Walked with a Zombie, Jones played a similar role as the zombie Kolaga in the 1945 comedy horror film Zombies on Broadway. Unlike Carrefour, however, Kolaga commits acts of violence. In 1947, Jones appeared in The Macomber Affair in an uncredited role as a Masai warrior, and in 1949 he played Keega in the adventure film Zamba (also known as Zamba, the Gorilla). In 1957, Jones appeared in a minor role in the drama film Something of Value.

In 1991, film critic Danny Peary described Jones as having been "even more typecast than the typical black actor," writing that his roles were "limited to jungle pictures."

== Selected filmography ==
Film
Year	Title	Role	Notes	Ref(s)
1933	Tarzan the Fearless	Head Bearer	Film serial; uncredited role	
1935	Queen of the Jungle	Native	Film serial; uncredited role	
1936	Tarzan Escapes	Bomba		
1937	Swing High, Swing Low	Black Santa Claus	Uncredited role	
1937	A Day at the Races	Trumpet player	Uncredited role	
1940	Broken Strings	Stringbeans Johnson		
1941	Virginia	Joseph		
1942	Tarzan's New York Adventure	Swahili chief	Uncredited role	
1942	White Cargo	Darby		
1943	I Walked with a Zombie	Carrefour		
1943	Passport to Suez	Bellhop	Uncredited role	
1943	Sleepy Lagoon	Cannibal	Uncredited role	
1945	Zombies on Broadway	Kolaga the Zombie		
1947	The Macomber Affair	Masai warrior	Uncredited role	
1949	Rope of Sand	Batsuma chief	Uncredited role	
1949	Zamba	Keega	Also known as Zamba, the Gorilla	
1957	Something of Value	Wine steward	Uncredited role	
