= One Night in Lisbon =

1941 film by Edward H. Griffith

- Directed by: Edward H. Griffith
- Written by: Virginia Van Upp
- Based on: There's Always Juliet by John Van Druten
- Produced by: Edward H. Griffith
- Starring: Fred MacMurray; Madeleine Carroll; Patricia Morison; John Loder
- Cinematography: Bert Glennon
- Edited by: Eda Warren
- Music by: Victor Young
- Production company: Paramount Pictures
- Distributed by: Paramount Pictures
- Release date: June 13, 1941
- Running time: 97 minutes
- Country: United States
- Language: English

One Night in Lisbon is a 1941 American comedy thriller film directed by Edward H. Griffith and starring Fred MacMurray, Madeleine Carroll and Patricia Morison. It was one of a cycle of pro-British films produced in Hollywood before the United States' entry into the war in December 1941. The film is based on John Van Druten's 1931 British play There's Always Juliet, updated to include the current wartime situation.

== Plot ==
Dwight Houston (Fred MacMurray), an American pilot from Texas, meets a British aristocrat in London amid bombing, and gets caught up in a Nazi spy plot in Portugal. At first Houston is critical of Britain, due to what he perceives to be a condescending attitude on the part of Leonora Perrycoate (Madeleine Carroll); however, he soon realizes in fact that as American he has much in common with them, and that their fight is his fight, remarking poignantly that "It's funny about England and the way Americans feel about you. It's sort of like being related in a way. You know the way you feel about relatives. They do a lot of things that irritate you, but when it comes right down to it, you are related. You have the same ideas, speak the same language and have the same plans for the future," and he realizes that he "shares with them a common history, heritage, language and political ideology".

== Cast ==
- Fred MacMurray as Dwight Houston
- Madeleine Carroll as Leonora Perrycoate
- Patricia Morison as Gerry Houston
- John Loder as Cmdr. Peter Walmsley
- Billie Burke as Catherine Enfilden
- May Whitty as Florence
- Edmund Gwenn as Lord Fitzleigh
- Reginald Denny as Erich Strasser
- Billy Gilbert as Popopopoulos
- Marcel Dalio as Concierge
- Douglas Walton as Frank
- Bruce Wyndham as Strasser's Aide
- Herbert Evans as John, the Butler
- James Finlayson as Air Raid Warden
- Lumsden Hare as Doorman
- Billy Bevan as Lord Fitzleigh's Aide
- Catherine Craig as Guest
- Max Wagner as Waiter
- Evan Thomas as Diplomat
- Mikhail Rasumny as Restaurant Manager

== Bibliography ==
- Dick, Bernard F. The Star-Spangled Screen: The American World War II Film. University Press of Kentucky, 1996.
- Glancy, H. Mark. When Hollywood Loved Britain: The Hollywood 'British' Film 1939-1945. Manchester University Press, 1999.
