= Cafe Society (1939 film) =

1939 film by Edward H. Griffith

- Film poster
- Directed by: Edward H. Griffith
- Written by: Virginia Van Upp
- Produced by: Jeff Lazarus
- Starring: Madeleine Carroll; Fred MacMurray; Shirley Ross
- Cinematography: Ted Tetzlaff
- Edited by: Paul Weatherwax
- Music by: Leo Shuken
- Production company: Paramount Pictures
- Distributed by: Paramount Pictures
- Release dates: February 22, 1939 (New York City); March 3, 1939 (United States)
- Running time: 93 minutes
- Country: United States
- Language: English

Cafe Society is a 1939 American romantic comedy film directed by Edward H. Griffith and starring Madeleine Carroll, Fred MacMurray and Shirley Ross. A wealthy young woman marries a reporter to win a bet.

== Plot ==
The wealthy Christopher "Chris" West is a member of the cafe society. To win a bet, she marries reporter Crick O'Bannon, who believes Chris married him for love. When Crick overhears Chris telling one of her friends about the bet, he decides to get even by writing a story about her betrayal. In response, Chris's grandfather, Christopher West Sr, apologizes for his granddaughter's behavior and requests that the couple live together until the divorce is quietly finalized in order to avoid a scandal. Because he dislikes Chris' society friends, Crick refuses and lives apart from her.

While still married, Chris and Crick constantly argue. When she notices that Crick is close to nightclub singer Bells Browne, Chris becomes jealous but resigned that Crick prefers Bells. She decides to sail for Europe, but is surprised when Crick appears on the ship, having been alerted to Chris's departure by her grandfather. Crick explains that Bells is only a friend and Chris returns to shore with him. However, Chris's jealousy resurfaces upon seeing Bells singing at the club that night and she persuades the club's owner to fire Bells. When the bartender, Bill, calls Chris out on her brash behavior, a contrite Chris asks that Bells be rehired and admits to Crick that she has been an awful fool.

== Cast ==
- Madeleine Carroll as Christopher West
- Fred MacMurray as Chick O'Bannon
- Shirley Ross as Bells Browne
- Jessie Ralph as Mrs. De Witt
- Claude Gillingwater as Old Christopher West
- Allyn Joslyn as Sonny De Witt
- Paul Hurst as Bartender
- Lillian Yarbo as Mattie Harriett (uncredited)

== Songs ==
- "Kiss Me With Your Eyes", composed by Burton Lane, lyrics by Frank Loesser, sung by Shirley Ross as Bells Browne
- "The Park Avenue Gimp", by Frank Loesser
- "Cocktails for Two", by Arthur Johnston and Sam Coslow

== Bibliography ==
- Stephens, Michael L. Art Directors in Cinema: A Worldwide Biographical Dictionary. McFarland, 1998.
