= An Innocent Affair =

1948 film by Lloyd Bacon

- Theatrical release poster
- Directed by: Lloyd Bacon
- Written by: Lou Breslow; Joseph Hoffman
- Produced by: James Nasser
- Starring: Fred MacMurray; Madeleine Carroll; Charles "Buddy" Rogers; Rita Johnson; Louise Allbritton; Alan Mowbray
- Cinematography: Edward Cronjager
- Edited by: Fred W. Berger
- Music by: Hans J. Salter
- Production company: James Nasser Productions
- Distributed by: United Artists
- Release date: October 15, 1948
- Running time: 90 minutes
- Country: United States
- Language: English

An Innocent Affair is a 1948 American comedy film directed by Lloyd Bacon and written by Lou Breslow and Joseph Hoffman. The film stars Fred MacMurray, Madeleine Carroll, Charles "Buddy" Rogers, Rita Johnson, Louise Allbritton and Alan Mowbray. It was released on October 15, 1948 by United Artists. In the United Kingdom, the film was released under the title Don't Trust Your Husband.

== Plot ==
Advertising man Vincent Doane is assigned to land Margot Fraser's perfume account. Anxious that his wife Paula might become jealous, he tells her that the account is with a Mr. Fraser.

Paula becomes suspicious and plays a trick on Vincent. She hires an actor to pretend to be a gigolo who is interested in her, but she does not know that Vincent knows about the ruse. Business tycoon Claude Kimball is mistaken for the gigolo and is ensnared in the Doanes' schemes.

Vincent is shocked when Claude arranges for a multimillion-dollar tobacco account to come his way. Paula demands a divorce during the confusion, convinced that Vincent has been having an affair with Margot. At a train station, Margot slaps Paula, who finally realizes that her husband has been faithful to her all along.

== Cast ==
- Fred MacMurray as Vincent Doane
- Madeleine Carroll as Paula Doane
- Charles "Buddy" Rogers as Claude Kimball (as Chas. "Buddy" Rogers)
- Rita Johnson as Eve Lawrence
- Louise Allbritton as Margot Fraser
- Alan Mowbray as Ken St. Clair
- Michael Romanoff as Venetian Room Maître d'hôtel (as Mike Romanoff)
- Pierre Watkin as T.D. Hendricks
- William Tannen as Gaylord
- James Seay as Lester Burnley
- Matt McHugh as Ted Burke
- Marie Blake as Hilda
- Susan Miller as Venetian Room Vocalist
- Anne Nagel as Gladys
- Eddie Le Baron as Venetian Room Orchestra Leader
- Jane Weeks as Dori

== Production ==
Fred MacMurray bought the story from writers Lou Breslow and Joseph Hoffman and then sold it to Nasser Productions for $75,000, returning him a large profit. MacMurray was paid more than $150,000 for his role in the film and also received a percentage of its profits.

Norma Shearer and Myrna Loy were considered for the role of Paula Doane.

Nasser Productions made a lucrative offer to Italian conductor Arturo Toscanini to compose the film's music but eventually hired Hans J. Salter. Buddy Rogers received ballroom dance lessons from Arthur Murray for the film.

Filming was delayed by the late arrival of Madeleine Carroll but began on March 15, 1948.

After positive preview screenings, producer James Nasser purchased another comedy script written by Breslow and Hoffman titled You Made Me Love You for $100,000. Nasser intended the project as a sequel of sorts to An Innocent Affair, with director Lloyd Bacon, Rogers, MacMurray and Carroll returning, but the film did not materialize.

== Reception ==
In a contemporary review for The New York Times, critic Thomas M. Pryor wrote: "Perhaps the writers didn't try hard enough, or perhaps this picture represents their level best, but, in any case, the truth of the matter is that the merriment is spread rather thin and unevenly. 'Bounce' is what this farcical excursion lacks."
