= The General Died at Dawn =

1936 film by Lewis Milestone

- Theatrical release poster
- Directed by: Lewis Milestone
- Written by: Charles G. Booth; Clifford Odets
- Produced by: William LeBaron
- Starring: Gary Cooper; Madeleine Carroll; Akim Tamiroff
- Cinematography: Victor Milner
- Edited by: Eda Warren
- Music by: Werner Janssen, †Gerard Carbonara (uncredited), Main Title & Opening Scene
- Distributed by: Paramount Pictures
- Release date: September 2, 1936
- Running time: 98 minutes
- Country: United States
- Language: English

The General Died at Dawn is a 1936 American drama film that tells the story of a mercenary who meets a beautiful girl while trying to keep arms from getting to a vicious warlord in war-torn China. The movie was written by Charles G. Booth and Clifford Odets and directed by Lewis Milestone.

It stars Gary Cooper, Madeleine Carroll, Akim Tamiroff, and Dudley Digges. Director Milestone has a cameo role.

== Plot ==
General Yang, a warlord with control of one of China's twelve provinces, plans to overtake them all with his army to corner the markets of silk, rice, and opium. However, his opposition, in the form of Mr. Wu who is leading a rebellion against Yang, knows that Yang is lacking enough loyal men to cement his grip on the whole of China, and those who are with him could desert him for a competing warlord. As such, Wu searches out for O'Hara, a soldier of fortune, to go to Shanghai to buy weapons from a hard-drinking gunrunner named Brighton who is selling to the first bidder. The money O'Hara is given is kept in a belt and was funded by the peasants trapped under Yang's oppressive rule. In the way of all of this is the Perrie family, made up of Peter and his daughter Judy. Peter is in poor health and is desperate for money so he and his daughter can return to the United States. Judy reluctantly goes along with her father's plan to distract O'Hara while Yang commandeers the train and captures him. Taking the money belt entrusted to O'Hara, he gives it Peter and orders him to deliver it to Brighton in Shanghai so that it will be used to buy guns for Yang's men, and not Wu's. O'Hara is taken prisoner to Yang's boat.

After the Perries arrive in Shanghai, Peter betrays Yang by not meeting with Brighton as ordered and uses some of the money to buy steamship tickets for himself and his daughter to leave China. Peter hides the remaining money in the lining of his suitcase while Judy has second thoughts about the trip to America; complicating matters is a man named Leach who, having observed Peter purchasing the steamship tickets and noticing that the monogram on Peter's wallet didn't match the false name he used to buy them, suspects that Peter is using stolen money and tries to get a cut from it. Meanwhile, O'Hara escapes from Yang's boat and gets to the hotel/bar where Brighton is headquartered and where Wu is awaiting him; which, by coincidence, is also where the Perries happen to be staying. While O'Hara grills Judy about the money's whereabouts, Peter, who is hiding unseen and observing from the next room, betrays his presence, and tries to save himself and his hiding place by shooting O'Hara in the hand, but O'Hara gets the upper hand and kills him. Yang and his men then arrive and take Judy, O'Hara, Wu, Brighton, Leach, and the Perries' luggage all captive on Yang's boat, where Yang is determined to find out what happened to the money.

Judy is prepared to tell him where the money is to save the lives of O'Hara and Wu, but Yang cruelly orders her to kiss O'Hara goodbye first. When Brighton, kept prisoner below deck, wakens from his drunken stupor, he accidentally finds the money while using a knife to look for any alcohol concealed in the luggage. When he angrily states the currency which dropped on the floor is American and tries to escape the clutches of soldiers guarding him, Yang goes below deck to see the source of the commotion; Brighton stumbles into Yang with the knife, mortally wounding the general, who stumbles back above deck and orders his men to kill the prisoners. Leach, trying to ingratiate himself to Yang to save himself at the expense of the other captives, is the first to be executed. Before the rest of them are killed, O'Hara, trying to save their lives, appeals to Yang's ego and pleads with him to let them live so they can tell the story of the general's 'greatness' and the truth of how he died, lest his subjects and the world falsely believe that he was killed by his own men. Yang, convinced, spares their lives and orders his men to kill each other for the sake of honour before he himself dies. Dawn breaks as Judy and O'Hara embrace.

== Cast ==
- Gary Cooper as O'Hara
- Madeleine Carroll as Judy Perrie
- Akim Tamiroff as General Yang
- Dudley Digges as Mr. Wu
- Porter Hall as Peter Perrie/Peter Martin
- William Frawley as Brighton
- J.M. Kerrigan as Leach
- Philip Ahn as Oxford
- Lee Tung Foo as Mr. Chen
- Leonid Kinskey as Stewart (shipping line clerk)
- Val Durand as Wong
- Willie Fung as Bartender
- Hans Fuerberg as Yang's Military Advisor
- John O'Hara as Newspaper Reporter

== Production ==
There are several scenes in the film that show startling originality at the time. At one point, the camera focuses on a white doorknob, and then dissolves to a white billiard ball to connect disparate scenes. In another scene, two characters have a conversation in which they speculate about the fates of other characters in the drama. The answers to their questions appear in screen segments in the corners of the screen, marking an unusual use of split screen to join narrative.

The main character, O'Hara, is based on the real-life Anglo-Canadian Jewish adventurer Morris Abraham "Two-Gun" Cohen. During the early 1930s, Cohen ran guns for various warlords in mainland China.

This is reported to be the first film to use foam latex prosthetics. Makeup artist Charles Gemora applied sponge rubber eyelids for one of the actors.

== Reception ==
Writing for The Spectator in 1936, Graham Greene gave the film a mildly good review, calling it "as good as anything to be seen on the screen in London". Greene noted that it was "a melodrama of more than usual skill", but criticized the end of the film and suggested that but for the "rather ludicrous ending, this would have been one of the best 'thrillers' for some years".

John Howard Reid called it one of the fifty finest films Hollywood ever made.

== Awards and nominations ==
The movie was nominated for Academy Awards for Best Actor in a Supporting Role (Akim Tamiroff), Best Cinematography, and Best Music, Score.

== In popular culture ==
In 1938 an animated cartoon, called The Major Lied Till Dawn, was produced by Leon Schlesinger Productions. In it, a major tells tall tales about his hunting adventures to a boy who resembles Freddie Bartholomew. The character of the major may have been influenced by Colonel Heeza Liar.

A third-season episode of the TV show M*A*S*H was entitled "The General Flipped at Dawn" (broadcast September 10, 1974). In the episode, Harry Morgan appears as Major General Bartford Hamilton Steele, a batty general who is convinced that the 4077th needs to move closer to the front lines, to be near the action. (Morgan formally joined the cast of M*A*S*H in Season Four as the much-saner Colonel Sherman T. Potter.)

The General Danced at Dawn is a collection of short stories by George MacDonald Fraser first published in 1970.
