= Princess O'Rourke =

1943 film by Norman Krasna

- Theatrical release poster
- Directed by: Norman Krasna
- Written by: Norman Krasna
- Produced by: Hal B. Wallis
- Starring: Olivia de Havilland; Robert Cummings; Charles Coburn
- Cinematography: Ernest Haller
- Edited by: Warren Low
- Music by: Friedrich Hollaender
- Production company: Warner Bros. Pictures
- Distributed by: Warner Bros. Pictures
- Release date: October 23, 1943
- Running time: 93 or 94 minutes
- Country: United States
- Language: English
- Budget: $651,000
- Box office: $3,099,000

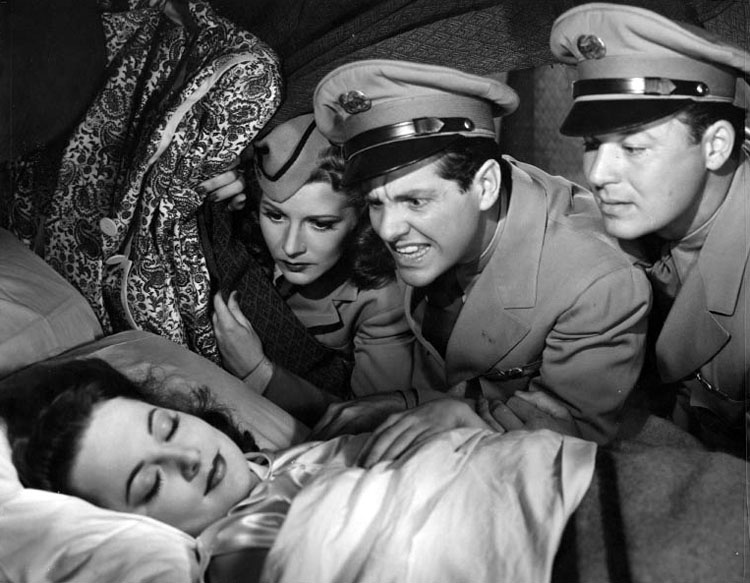
Olivia de Havilland, Julie Bishop, Robert Cummings, and Jack Carson

Princess O'Rourke is a 1943 American romantic comedy film directed and written by Norman Krasna (in Krasna's directorial debut), and starring Olivia de Havilland, Robert Cummings and Charles Coburn. Krasna won the 1944 Oscar for Best Original Screenplay.

Although conceived as a vehicle for de Havilland, Princess O'Rourke turned out to be a troubled project that led to the de Havilland Law, that changed the status of contracts in the U.S. film industry. Filmed in 1942, the release was held up for one year due to legal issues that resulted from the production.

== Plot ==
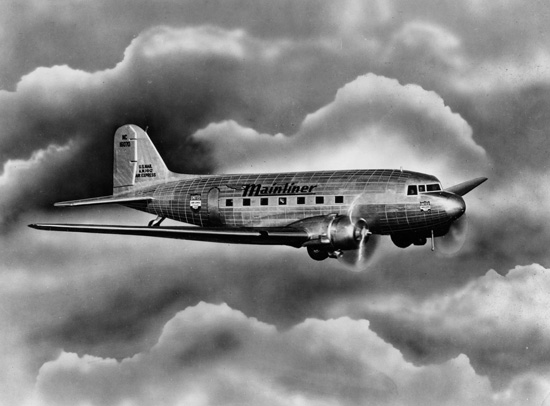
Eddie and Maria meet aboard a Douglas DST "Skysleeper" with sleeping bunks for passengers.

During World War II, Princess Maria and her uncle Holman, exiles from their (unnamed) conquered European country, live in New York City. Holman hopes that his niece will marry and produce a male heir as soon as possible, but she is not interested in his preferred choice, Count Peter de Chandome, or the other candidates that he has suggested.

While flying to California incognito as "Mary Williams", the princess—fearful of flying—is accidentally given too many sleeping pills. When the Douglas DST airliner returns to New York because of bad weather, the crew cannot wake her. The pilot, Eddie O'Rourke, takes care of her, still unaware who she is. She wakes up the next morning in his apartment wearing his pajamas.

To explain her absence, Maria tells her uncle that she slept at the airport. She spends the day with Eddie, his friend and co-pilot, Dave Campbell, and Dave's wife Jean (who had put Maria to bed). "Mary" tells them she is a war refugee and was traveling to California to work as an upstairs maid. She and Eddie quickly fall in love. With both Eddie and Dave about to join the United States Army Air Forces, Eddie impulsively proposes to Mary. She accepts, but sadly believes that, as a princess, she cannot marry him.

A Secret Service agent assigned to protect Maria tells her uncle of the relationship. Holman is not opposed to Maria marrying a commoner, and is pleased to learn that Eddie is one of nine brothers and his father one of 11. Holman also knows that his niece marrying an American would strengthen his country's vital relationship with the United States. To Maria's surprise and joy, he permits the marriage, and Eddie is stunned to learn that his poor European refugee is actually royalty.

President Franklin D. Roosevelt invites Maria and Eddie to stay at the White House. Given a crash course in royal protocol by a representative of the State Department, Eddie becomes increasingly uncomfortable with the conditions attached to the role of prince consort and being financially supported by his wife, with no career other than fathering an heir. While discussing the prenuptial agreement, he finally rebels when he is informed he must surrender his American citizenship. After making an impassioned speech about how lucky he is to be an American, Eddie asks "Mary" to choose between him and her family. Maria obeys her uncle and leaves the room; a disappointed Eddie calls her a "slave". Holman locks her in the Lincoln Bedroom.

After much crying, Maria writes a note and slips it under the door for Roosevelt's dog, Fala, to deliver to his master. In the middle of the night, the President summons a Supreme Court judge to marry Eddie and Maria. Afterward, the newlyweds sneak out of the White House. On the way out, Eddie bumps into a man standing behind the door; he mistakes the man for a guard. Outside, Maria tells him that the "guard" was actually the President. Astonished, Eddie exclaims, “I tipped him a buck! And he took it!” (Note: Although mostly obscured behind a door in his sole appearance onscreen, Roosevelt is depicted standing up rather than in his wheelchair. His disability was usually hidden from the public during his lifetime.)

== Cast ==
- Olivia de Havilland as Princess Maria (aka "Mary Williams") (credited as "Olivia DeHavilland")
- Robert Cummings as Eddie O'Rourke
- Charles Coburn as Holman
- Jack Carson as Dave Campbell, Eddie's friend and co-pilot
- Jane Wyman as Jean Campbell, Dave's wife
- Harry Davenport as Supreme Court Judge
- Gladys Cooper as Miss Haskell, the governess and secretary
- Minor Watson as Mr. Washburn, the State Department diplomat who tutors Eddie
- Nan Wynn as Singer in Chinese restaurant
- Curt Bois as Count Peter de Chandome
- Julie Bishop as Stewardess
- Ray Walker as "G-Man" (Secret Service)
- Whiskers as Fala

== Production ==
=== Development ===
In the early 1940s Norman Krasna had established himself as a leading screenwriter. He wanted to move into directing and in February 1942 signed a contract with Warner Bros to write and direct. His first assignment was to be Princess O'Rourke.

=== Casting ===
In April 1942 Warner Bros announced Loretta Young would play the lead. In May Warner Bros arranged to borrow Fred MacMurray from Paramount to play the male lead in exchange for Ann Sheridan who Paramount wanted to play Texas Guinan. Also that month Hal Wallis announced he would produce.

By June, however, the arrangement to exchange MacMurray for Sheridan was cancelled. (The Texas Guinan movie went on to be made with Betty Hutton, and MacMurray would not finish No Time for Love in time.) The male lead went to Cummings, who was borrowed from Universal and who had worked for Warners on Kings Row. The female lead went to de Havilland. Charles Coburn joined the cast in late June.

De Havilland initially refused the part and subsequently was suspended by Warner Bros. (Note: The casting of de Havilland was due to producer Hal B. Wallis wanting to showcase his "protege".)

Feeling that being cast in a lightweight role would limit her future in Hollywood features, de Havilland also began to have medical problems that compounded her anxiety. During her suspension, Alexis Smith was tested as a replacement. Claude Rains campaigned to be in the film, but the casting of Charles Coburn solidified the main cast choices.

=== Shooting ===
Filming started on 9 July 1942. It ended in September 1942.

According to Ben Mankiewicz’s introduction to the 24 November 2019 airing of the picture on TCM, the production was given limited access to film at the White House, courtesy of President Roosevelt. In addition, FDR's beloved Scottie dog Fala—already a well-known film personality in his own right—played himself, because, as Mankiewicz said, "No dog body-doubles for Fala." Even so, Whiskers is also credited in some places (including the current cast list on TCM.com).

The airport scenes were shot at Burbank Airport. (Note: Besides the DST, a Douglas DC-3 in Eastern Air Lines livery is featured in a later scene. The stock footage of the airliner taking off silhouetted against the sky, however, is of a Boeing 247.)

Cummings often was unavailable, as he was simultaneously working on Between Us Girls at Universal Studios, forcing de Havilland to at times deliver lines to a stand-in. Aged actor Coburn also frequently forgot his lines, leading to many retakes which sapped her energy further.

Cummings also fell ill with ptomaine poisoning during the shoot and missed several days.

De Havilland fought openly with Warner Bros. Tired and suffering from low blood pressure, the formerly steady and hard-working actress began reporting late for work, leaving the set abruptly and going home when her frustrations became too much. This was very atypical behavior from the actor. She would eventually file a lawsuit against the studio in a landmark case that resulted in passage of legislation known as the de Havilland Law (California Labor Code Section 2855), that set a seven-calendar-year limit on studio-player contracts.

The film was completed ten days behind schedule on 9 September. Due to the legal issues, it was eventually released a year after the production wrapped. Princess O'Rourke became the penultimate film that de Havilland completed while on contract to Warner Bros. (Note: Following the protracted legal tussles, Jack Warner "assigned" de Havilland to RKO to star in Government Girl (1943), another project that she detested.) (Note: Devotion (1946), completed in 1943 and released in 1946, was de Havilland's last Warner Bros. film.)

De Havilland and Cummings both sued their studios over their long-term contracts.

=== Music ===
The film features "Honorable Moon," a song by composer Arthur Schwartz and lyricists Edward "Yip" Harburg and Ira Gershwin. They had written the song in 1941 for a United China Relief fundraiser, and they donated the money they received from Warner Bros. to the same organization. Nan Wynn sings "Honorable Moon" during a Chinese restaurant scene.

=== Censorship ===
While in post-production, the wartime Bureau of Motion Pictures (BMP) screened a copy of Princess O'Rourke and strenuously objected to the film. Unlike other feature productions, a script had not been pre-approved by the BMP. Nelson Poynter, the director of the liaison office in Hollywood, stated that the film was an example of studios "... recklessly using the war for background incidents in an opportunistic attempt to capitalize on the war rather than interpret it." Poynter was particularly upset about the "ridiculous" caricatures of Red Cross workers, European nobility, the Secret Service, and even the President (described as a "busybody"). With the film already finished, however, no attempt was made to censor or restrict its release.

== Reception ==
=== Critical ===
Although largely forgotten today, Princess O'Rourke was a success at the time. It received generally favorable contemporary reviews.

The famously rigorous Bosley Crowther of The New York Times was captivated by the film, by a story that he thought could only be possible in America, and that "... it happens with such spirit and humor that you'll be bound to concede it might be."

The review in Variety was even more effusive:

Princess O'Rourke is a spritely, effervescing and laugh-explosive comedy-romance. Credit for general sparkle and excellence of the picture must be tossed to Norman Krasna, who handled the writing and directing responsibilities. It's Krasna's initial directing assignment.

The film marked a turning point in Jane Wyman's career, as she was given the opportunity to display her comedic talents, sparring capably with her foil, Jack Carson. (Note: Despite the turmoil on the set, in later years, de Havilland considered the role of Princess Maria one of the few truly satisfying characters she played for Warner Bros.)

More recent reviews, however, have been far more critical, with Leonard Maltin, noting in a one-paragraph review on TCM.com, "[The] very dated comedy starts charmingly with pilot Cummings falling in love with Princess de Havilland, bogs down in no longer timely situations, unbearably coy finale involving (supposedly) F.D.R. himself."

Film historian Thomas G. Aylesworth stated, "[the] supporting cast of real professionals probably saved the movie."

Film historians such as Roger Fristoe, retired film critic for the Courier-Journal in Louisville, Kentucky, have noted similarities to the later, more highly regarded romantic comedy Roman Holiday (1953), directed and produced by William Wyler, starring Gregory Peck as a reporter and Audrey Hepburn as a royal princess out to see Rome on her own. Biographer Daniel Bubbeo characterized Princess O'Rourke as a "fluffier" antecedent of Roman Holiday.

=== Box office ===
According to Variety, the film earned $2.3 million in rentals in North America in 1943. According to Warner Bros. records, the film made $2,257,000 domestically and $842,000 foreign.

=== Legacy ===
Norman Krasna later said "everybody thought de Havilland was a great comedienne in Princess O'Rourke; it's not true. She was just darling, an ingenue. And everybody else is in on the joke - Jane Wyman, Bob Cummings, Charles Coburn; they were great comedians all around. So it comes out as a comedy and they go and put her in Government Girl for Dudley Nichols and she falls on her ass. Don't let her be the comedy!"

Wyman's performance was admired by Billy Wilder and Charles Brackett and led to her being cast in The Lost Weekend. De Havilland regarded the film as trivial, but she later worked with Krasna again in The Ambassador's Daughter (1956).

Despite the film's success, Krasna only directed two more films. "I'm not a good director, not at all," he said later. "I know how to direct what I write; but then I write knowing that I'm able to direct it." Krasna said the film was among his favorites of his own [written] works, the others being The Devil and Miss Jones, Mr and Mrs Smith, Bachelor Mother and My Geisha.

Filmink wrote the movie "features the quintessential “Robert Cummings part” – he plays a flyer, an amiable guy, up against a big female star in a romantic comedy, with strong support players around him. It was the last time Cummings made a movie with Krasna, which was a great shame as the actor was perfect for the latter's work – many subsequent films from Krasna would cry out for a romantic male lead with the Cummings touch."

=== Lawsuit ===
In 1944, Helen Grace Carlisle sued the filmmakers, alleging plagiarism.

== Awards ==
Krasna won the 1944 Academy Award for Best Writing (Original Screenplay) for Princess O'Rourke.
