= Norman Krasna =

American dramatist, screenwriter, and film director (1909–1984)

- Krasna in later life
- Born: November 7, 1909; Queens, New York City, New York, U.S.
- Died: November 1, 1984 (aged 74); Los Angeles, California, U.S.
- Years active: 1932–1964
- Spouse(s): Ruth Frazee (1940–1950); Erle Chennault Galbraith (1951–1984)

Norman Krasna (November 7, 1909 – November 1, 1984) was an American screenwriter, playwright, producer, and film director who penned screwball comedies centered on a case of mistaken identity. Krasna directed three films during a forty-year career in Hollywood. He garnered four Academy Award screenwriting nominations, winning once for 1943's Princess O'Rourke, which he also directed. Krasna wrote a number of successful Broadway plays, including Dear Ruth and John Loves Mary.

== Early life and career ==
Krasna was born on November 7, 1909, in Queens, New York City. He attended Columbia University and St. John's University School of Law, working at Macy's Department Store during the day. Krasna wanted to get into journalism and talked his way into a job as a copy boy for the Sunday feature department of the New York World in 1928. While at that newspaper, he worked with Lewis Weitzenkorn who turned Krasna into a character in the play Five Star Final.

Krasna eventually quit law school, and worked his way up to being a drama critic, at first for The World then the New York Evening Graphic and Exhibitors Herald World. He was offered a job with Hubert Voight in the publicity department of Warner Bros. and moved to Hollywood. By May 1930 he was established in Los Angeles.

=== Press agent and playwright ===
Krasna decided to become a playwright after seeing The Front Page. To learn the craft, he retyped the Ben Hecht–Charles MacArthur classic more than twenty times. Then while working as a press agent at Warners, Krasna wrote a play at night. This was Louder, Please, based on his job and heavily inspired by The Front Page with the lead character inspired by his boss, Hubert Voight.

Krasna tried to sell the play to Warners who were not interested – indeed they fired him from his job as publicity agent. However Louder, Please was picked up by George Abbott who produced it on Broadway. The play had a short run starting November 1931, and Krasna was then offered a contract at Columbia Pictures as a junior staff writer. He also wrote a play Paging Napoleon which was given some limited performances.

=== Columbia ===
In April 1932 Krasna was assigned to his first film to work on as a screenwriter, Hollywood Speaks (1932), directed by Eddie Buzzell with Jo Swerling also credited as a writer. Krasna would go on to write four pictures at Columbia, one in collaboration, the rest on his own. After that he was put in charge of the junior writers and no longer wrote on his own.

In August Krasna was working on That's My Boy (1932). He also did Parole Girl (1933).

In October 1932 he was appointed assistant to Harry Cohn. In March 1933 the studio exercised its option on his services for another year.

Krasna wrote So This Is Africa (1933) for Wheeler and Woolsey, who had come to Columbia for one movie. Krasna later tried to get his name taken off the credits after censors refused to allow some of his dialogue. "You can’t tell me I had any aspirations toward great art there," he said later.

In May 1933 Harry Cohn of Columbia loaned him to MGM for 11 months starting with Going Going Gone with Lee tracy.

In June 1933 Eddie Buzzell arranged for Universal to borrow Krasna from MGM to work on the script for Love, Honor, and Oh Baby! (1933). He also worked on Meet the Baron (1933).

While at MGM Krasna was assigned to Universal to work on a script Countess of Monte Cristo.

In January 1934 Universal assigned him to write The Practical Joker for Chester Morris.

During the evenings of his stint at Columbia, Krasna wrote another play, Small Miracle, which was produced on Broadway in 1934. It had a reasonable run and earned good reviews. " Best notices I ever got," he said.

Krasna went to RKO where he wrote The Richest Girl in the World (1934), which earned him an Oscar. He stayed at that studio to do Romance in Manhattan (1935).

In September 1934 Krasna was working on The Man Who Broke the Bank at Monte Carlo at 20th.

=== Paramount ===
In November 1934 Krasna signed a two-year contract at Paramount at $1,500 a week for 42 weeks a year. Variety called this "the juiciest young writer contract in Hollywood." Part of this deal (negotiated by Krasna's agent Zeppo Marx) included adapting his own play Small Miracle which had been sold to the studio for $37,500. Small Miracle became Four Hours to Kill! (1935), directed by Mitchell Leisen.

Krasna also wrote Hands Across the Table (1935). At MGM, Krasna worked on Wife vs. Secretary (1936).

Around the time of Small Miracle he had an idea for a play about a lynching, Mob Rule, but was persuaded against writing it as a play on the grounds it was non commercial. He told the idea to Joseph Mankiewicz who bought it as a film for MGM. It became Fury (1936), directed by Fritz Lang. The film earned Krasna an Oscar nomination.

In August 1936 Paramount announced that Krasna would make his directorial debut in a movie he wrote for George Raft, Wonderful, co-starring Helen Burgess. However the following month Raft objected and the project was suspended. (The film was made two years later, as You and Me (1938) with Fritz Lang directing.)

At Warners he wrote The King and the Chorus Girl (1937) with good friend Groucho Marx.

In November 1936 he was reportedly working on a new version of Hotel Imperial. He moved to Universal to do As Good as Married (1937) for his old collaborator Eddie Buzzell

=== MGM ===
In early 1937 he went to MGM for Big City (1937) with Spencer Tracy, which Krasna also produced. He also wrote and produced The First Hundred Years (1938), originally called Turnabout. In August 1938 MGM announced he would produce The Broadway Melody of 1939. He was also going to produce a James Stewart film about the ship CSS Patrick Henry. Krasna ended up making neither of the latter two. In September 1938 MGM announced it would not renew its contract with Krasna.

=== RKO ===
In December 1938 Kransa joined RKO and was assigned to work for George Stevens. He wrote the script for Bachelor Mother (1939), which was a huge success. In April 1939 Krasna's income for the previous year was $83,000.

In September 1939 he signed a contract with Universal to write the Deanna Durbin vehicle It's a Date (1940).

For Carole Lombard he wrote Mr. & Mrs. Smith (1941) at RKO, which he sold for $60,000 in 1939.

In April 1940 he signed an agreement with Jean Arthur and Arthur's husband Frank Ross to write and produce a film. That became The Devil and Miss Jones (1941), which he co-produced. It was released by RKO. A second film was announced by the company, Googer Plays the Field, but was never made. Krasna later said Bachelor Mother and Devil in Miss Jones "are as much of a protest as I can make against the existing system, and it’s all in the framework of a comedy... I always get in my social comment—but limited according to what the subject needs."

He did two films for Universal: the René Clair-directed The Flame of New Orleans (1940) and another Durbin vehicle for Joe Pasternak, It Started with Eve (1941). He was working on another Durbin film The Good Fair.

In September 1941 Krasna was in New York working on a script, Fire Escape, produced by Ross. this became The Man with Blond Hair (1941), which he later described as his "attempt to win the Nobel Peace Prize". It only ran seven performances and encouraged Krasna to focus on comedies for the rest of his career. "I got burned" he said later.

== Turning director ==
In February 1942, Krasna signed a contract to Warner Bros to write and direct. This resulted in Princess O'Rourke (1943), which earned him the Academy Award for Best Original Screenplay. However, his career momentum as director was interrupted when he went into the U.S. Army Air Corps in September 1942, serving with the First Motion Picture Unit. He later said "I’m not a good director, not at all. I know how to direct what I write; but then I write knowing that I’m able to direct it."

While in the service, Krasna directed a film about the activities of the Officer Training School. He spent most of his time in the Air Corps at Camp Roach in Los Angeles, enabling him to live in his house in Beverly Hills.

During his war service, he continued to write in his spare time. He sent his old Bachelor Mother producer Buddy DeSylva, now at Paramount, the story for what would become Practically Yours (1944). He also adapted The Man with Blond Hair into a movie: in October 1943 Warners announced they purchased an unproduced play by Krasna called Night Action as a vehicle for Helmut Dantine (which was The Man with Blond Hair); the film was not made. In March 1944 RKO said they would make a film based on Krasna's story The Hunter Girl with Laraine Day – this was in fact another version of The Richest Girl in the World and was released as Bride by Mistake (1944). He also wrote Dear Ruth.

=== Broadway success ===
Moss Hart suggested Krasna write something like Junior Miss and Krasna responded with Dear Ruth. This debuted on Broadway in November 1944, financed solely by Lew Wasserman, and was a massive hit, running for 680 performances; the film rights were sold for over $450,000. (It was the basis of the 1947 film Dear Ruth 1947). By December 1945 it had earned over $1 million on Broadway and led to two touring productions, three USO productions and a plagiarism suit. (In August 1946 Krasna won the plagiariam suit.)

Krasna followed it with another comedy for Broadway, John Loves Mary (1947), originally William and Mary, directed by Joshua Logan. It was also very popular and was made into a film (at Warners, sold for $150,000 going up to $250,000) that Krasna did not work on.

Less successful was the play Time for Elizabeth (1947), co-written with Krasna's friend Groucho Marx, originally called The Middle Ages which had been written years earlier. The show ran for only eight performances, although film rights were sold for over $500,000. (The film was never made).

In January 1948 he was reportedly working on a musical with Irving Berlin, Stars on my Shoulder. This ended a few months later over a financial disagreement.

Krasna returned to directing feature films with The Big Hangover (1950) for MGM. He sold the script for a big amount but the movie was not a success.

Newspaper reports said he provided the original story for Borderline (1950) but he is not credited in the movie.

=== Wald-Krasna Productions ===
In June 1950 he and Jerry Wald formed a production company which was to start when Wald's contract with Warners expired. Later that month Howard Hughes announced he had bought out the remainder of Wald's contract with Warners for $150,000 so the duo could make 8-12 films a year at RKO.

In August they announced a $50 million slate of pictures – 12 films a year over five years. Among the films they were going to make were The Helen Morgan Story, Stars and Stripes starring Al Jolson, Behave Yourself, Size 12, Mother Knows Best, Easy Going, Country Club, The Strong Arm, Call Out the Marines, The Harder They Fall based on the novel by Budd Schulberg with Robert Ryan, Present for Katie by George Beck, Galahad, Cowpoke with Robert Mitchum, Strike a Match, The Blue Veil, All the Beautiful Girls to be directed by Busby Berkeley, Clash by Night by Clifford Odets, A Story for Grown Ups (based on The Time for Elizabeth), All Through the Night, Pilate's Wife, I Married a Woman, Years Ago, a biopic of Eleanor Duse. They had independence to make films up to $900,000. They bought rights to The Big Story radio show.

By March 1951 the team had made no films. They announced The Blue Veil, Strike a Match, Behave Yourself, Clash By Night, Cowpoke, The USO Story, Girls Wanted, Size 12, The Harted They Fall, I Married a Woman, All the Beautiful Girls and Beautiful Model.

Their first four films were Behave Yourself! (1951), The Blue Veil (1951), Clash by Night (1952) and The Lusty Men. (1952)

In November 1951 Krasna said he "liked it" at RKO "but they would have liked mediocrity". However, in December Krasna and Wald announced they intended to pick up their option to stay at RKO.

In January 1952 the team announced they had renegotiated their deal with Hughes again, and wanted to make two more films that year – one based on an original story by Krasna, the other directed by Krasna with Wald being executive producer. Wald said, "Norman and I didn't feel there was enough work for the two of us as executive producers... Norman wants to devote more time to writing." They were going to do High Heels and a musical version of Rain called Miss Sadie Thompson.

However Wald and Krasna became continually frustrated with Hughes. In May 1952 Wald bought out Krasna's interest in the company for $500,000 and Krasna returned to writing. In November 1952 Wald was appointed head of production at Columbia. He took some properties he developed with Krasna including Miss Sadie Thompson and an original of Krasna's Darling I Love You.

=== Return to Broadway ===
In July 1952 Krasna signed a contract with Paramount to write White Christmas (1954), originally meant to be a vehicle for Bing Crosby and Fred Astaire. His fee was $100,000; the film was a massive hit.

He returned to Broadway with a play he had written years earlier: Kind Sir starring Charles Boyer and Mary Martin directed by Joshua Logan.

In February 1954 Krasna announced he would write and direct an original film for Wald, now at Columbia, Speak to Me of Love. The title of this was changed to The Ambassador's Daughter. The film ended up not being made at Columbia – in February 1955 Krasna signed a two-picture deal to write and direct at Universal; the first was to be The Ambassador's Daughter and the second was Red Roses. The latter ended up not being made.

Ambassador starred actor John Forsythe who was put under personal contract to Krasna. Krasna wanted to reteam de Havilland and Forsythe in a film called Cabaret but it was never made.

In November 1954 Krasna was going to direct Jack of Spades starring Jackie Gleason but it was never made. Neither was a proposed film version of Time Out for Elizabeth although he and Marx sold it to Warners for $500,000 in October 1955.

In October 1956 Krasna signed to adapt the novel Stay Away Joe for MGM with Feur and Martin. (No film or show would result.)

A Time for Elizabeth was adapted for television. Krasna adapted Kind Sir as Indiscreet (1958), starring Cary Grant and Ingrid Bergman. Unlike the play it was a big success.

In August 1957 Krasna announced his play My Wife and I would be produced on Broadway with David Merrick. This became Who Was That Lady I Saw You With? (1958). Krasna then adapted this play for the screen and produced what became Who Was That Lady? (1960).

In July 1958 he signed to write a film for Jerry Wald, then at Fox, called High Dive. It was not made.

In July 1959 he signed to make what would become My Geisha.

In August 1959 Wald announced Fox would make The Billionaire from a script by Krasna starring Gregory Peck. This became Let's Make Love (1960) starring Marilyn Monroe, Yves Montand and Tony Randall.

In June 1960 Richard Quine announced Krasna would adapt Leslie Storm's play Roar Like a Dove for Doris Day. It was not made.

=== Seven Arts ===
Krasna wrote Sunday in New York, which reached Broadway with Robert Redford in 1961, directed by Garson Kanin. The film rights were bought by Ray Stark at Seven Arts, who formed a relationship with Krasna. They helped finance the film version of Sunday for which Krasna wrote the script.

In 1961 Krasna announced his play French Street, based on the Jacques Deval play Ramon Saro, would be produced by Seven Arts the following year, and turned into a film based on a script by Krasna, but the play did not go to Broadway and no film resulted.

In October 1962 Seven Arts announced they had bought the film rights to the Krasna play Watch the Birdie! and would co produce the play.

=== Later career ===
In May 1963 he signed to adapt A Shot in the Dark for Anatole Litvak. However Litvak was replaced by Blake Edwards and Krasna's script was not used.

In 1964 Garson Kanin announced he would direct both the Broadway production and film of Krasna's script Naked Mary, Will You Come Out? However no production resulted.

A comic play Love in E-Flat (1967) had a short run on Broadway. Reviewing it Walter Kerr said "Norman Krasna has become a pale echo of Norman Krasna."

In October 1967 he was reportedly working on a play called Blue Hour with Abe Burrows. David Merrick announced he would produce it. However it was never produced.

Some of his plays did reach Broadway: Watch the Birdie! (1969); Bunny (1970); We Interrupt This Program... (1975), a thriller; and Lady Harry (1978), which premiered in London. "Don't write anything without being sure of your market", said Krasna around the time of Lady Harry. "I like to think I've become a craftsman. When I was a kid I tried to knock them dead line by line. Now I like to build it more gently in a kid of mosaic." His last produced play was Off Broadway (1982).

Krasna spent many years living in Switzerland, but returned to Los Angeles before his death in 1984.

== Personal life ==
From 1940 to 1950 Krasna was married to Ruth Frazee, sister of actress Jane Frazee, with whom he had two children. They were divorced in April 1950 and she was awarded $262,500 and custody of the children.

In December 1951 he eloped with Al Jolson's widow Erle to Las Vegas. She had two children from her marriage to Jolson. They moved into the Palm Springs, California, home of Erle and Jolson. She inherited $1 million in trust and a $1 million property from Jolson.

They remained married until Krasna's death on November 1, 1984. He had six children.

== Partial filmography ==
- Hollywood Speaks (1932) – story, co-dialogue
- That's My Boy (1932) – script
- So This Is Africa (1933) – screenplay
- Parole Girl (1933) – uncredited contribution to script
- Love, Honor, and Oh Baby! (1933) – uncredited contribution
- Bombshell (1933, screenplay)
- Meet the Baron (1933) – co-author of screenplay with Herman J. Mankiewicz
- The Richest Girl in the World (1934) – story, script
- Romance in Manhattan (1935) – co-story
- Hands Across the Table (1935) – co-script
- Four Hours to Kill! (1935) – script, adaptation of his play Small Miracle
- Wife vs. Secretary (1936) – script
- Fury (1936) – story
- The King and the Chorus Girl (1937, co-writer with Groucho Marx)
- As Good as Married (1937) – story
- Big City (1937) – story, producer
- The First Hundred Years (1938) – story, producer
- You and Me (1938) – story, co-script
- Bachelor Mother (1939) – script
- It's a Date (1940) – script
- The Flame of New Orleans (1941) – story, script
- Mr. & Mrs. Smith (1941) – story, script
- The Devil and Miss Jones (1941) – story, script, producer
- It Started with Eve (1941) – co-script
- Princess O'Rourke (1943) – story, script, director
- Bride by Mistake (1944) – story (remake of The Richest Girl in the World)
- Practically Yours (1944) – story, script
- The Big Hangover (1950) – story, script, director, producer
- Two Tickets to Broadway (1951)
- Behave Yourself! (1951) – producer
- The Blue Veil (1951) – producer
- Clash by Night (1952) – producer
- The Lusty Men (1952) – producer
- White Christmas (1954) – co-story/script
- Bundle of Joy (1956) – co-script (remake of Bachelor Mother)
- The Ambassador's Daughter (1956) – script, director, producer
- Indiscreet (1958) – script, based on his play
- Who Was That Lady? (1960) – script, based on his play
- Let's Make Love (1960) – story, script
- My Geisha (1962) – story, script
- Sunday in New York (1963) – script based on his play
- I'd Rather Be Rich (1964) – co-story/script

=== Scripts for unrealized films ===
- Wonderful (circa 1936) – film for George Raft
- Hello, Russky! (mid-1950s) – a comedy about the Moiseyev Ballet with director René Clair|* Speak to Me of Love (1954)
- High Dive (circa 1959) – film for Jerry Wald about a water clown at a water carnival
- French Street (early 1960s)

== Theatre credits ==
- Paging Napoleon (1931) - one act play which had one performance in Los Angeles
- Louder, Please (1932)
- Small Miracle (1934)
- The Man with Blond Hair (1941) – also directed
- Dear Ruth (1944)
- John Loves Mary (1947)
- Time for Elizabeth (1949) – written with Groucho Marx, also directed
- Kind Sir (1954)
- Who Was That Lady I Saw You With? (1958)
- Sunday in New York (1962)
- Love in E-Flat (1967)
- Watch the Birdie! (1969) (originally written in 1961)
- Bunny (1970)
- We Interrupt This Program (1975)
- Off Broadway aka Full Moon (1976)
- Lady Harry (1978)

=== Unproduced plays ===
- Night Action (1940s) – film rights sold to Warner Bros as a vehicle for Helmut Dantine
- Stars on My Shoulders (1948) – musical with Irving Berlin
- French Street (circa 1962) based on Jacques Deval play Roman Saro about a priest and prostitute

== Academy Awards ==
=== Won ===
- Best Original Screenplay (Princess O'Rourke, 1943)

=== Nominated ===
- Best Original Story (The Richest Girl in the World, 1934)
- Best Original Story (Fury, 1936)
- Best Original Screenplay (The Devil and Miss Jones, 1941)

== Notes ==
- McGilligan, Patrick (1986). "Norman Krasna: The Woolworth's Touch". Backstory: Interviews with Screenwriters of Hollywood's Golden Age. University of California Press. pp. 212–240.
