= Watch the Birdie =

Watch the Birdie may refer to:

== Films ==
- Watch the Birdie (1950 film), featuring Red Skelton
- Watch the Birdie (1958 film), a Woody Woodpecker short cartoon
- Watch the Birdie, a 1975 short film in The Dogfather series

== Television ==
- "Watch the Birdie", a 1966 episode of I Dream of Jeannie
- "Watch the Birdie", a 1999 episode of ChuckleVision
- "Watch the Birdie", a 1988 episode of 'Allo 'Allo!
- "Watch the Birdie" (Bless This House), a 1973 episode
- "Watch the Birdie", an episode of Hello Kitty Paradise
- "Watch the Birdie / Wubbzy Tells a Whopper", an episode of Wow! Wow! Wubbzy!

== Other uses ==
- Watch the Birdie!, a 1964 play
- "Watch the Birdie", a song on the soundtrack of Lady and the Tramp
- "Watch the Birdie", a song from the film Hellzapoppin'
