= The Richest Girl in the World (1934 film) =

1934 film by William A. Seiter

- Original card
- Directed by: William A. Seiter
- Written by: Norman Krasna
- Produced by: Pandro S. Berman
- Starring: Miriam Hopkins; Joel McCrea; Fay Wray
- Cinematography: Nicholas Musuraca
- Edited by: George Crone
- Music by: Max Steiner
- Production company: RKO Radio Pictures
- Distributed by: RKO Radio Pictures
- Release date: September 21, 1934
- Running time: 76 minutes
- Country: United States
- Language: English

The Richest Girl in the World is a 1934 American romantic comedy film directed by William A. Seiter and starring Miriam Hopkins, Joel McCrea and Fay Wray. Norman Krasna was nominated for the Academy Award for Best Story. It was remade in 1944 as Bride by Mistake with Laraine Day and Alan Marshal.

== Plot ==
When the Titanic sinks, infant Dorothy Hunter is orphaned, but inherits a fortune. She is brought up by John Connors, whose wife also perished in the disaster. He goes to such great lengths to protect her privacy that, though she has grown into adulthood and acquired the title of the richest girl in the world, the newspapers do not have an up-to-date photograph of her. She returns to America, but asks her friend and secretary, Sylvia Lockwood, to impersonate her in a meeting with the managers of her trust fund, who also do not know what she looks like.

After seeing how happy Sylvia is with her new husband, Phillip, she broaches the topic of setting a wedding date with Donald, her longtime fiancé. He is forced to admit that he has fallen in love with someone else and was getting up the nerve to tell her. Since she is not the least bit in love, she congratulates him. However, it is too late to cancel the party in which she had planned to announce their wedding.

At the party, Dorothy and Sylvia continue pretending to be each other. Dorothy meets Anthony "Tony" Travers and, after winning $60 from him playing carom billiards, takes a great liking to him. However, stung by Donald's confession that he was never sure if he was attracted to her or her money, Dorothy decides to see if Tony would prefer her to the woman Tony thinks is her. She does all in her power to encourage him to court "Dorothy", even lending him money to do so. Connors warns her that she is being foolish, that no man could resist choosing such a seemingly wealthy and beautiful woman, but Dorothy is adamant. Sylvia and Phillip reluctantly play along.

Tony is invited to a weekend retreat. Connors, Sylvia, and Phillip arrive a day late, using the bad weather as an excuse to give Dorothy time alone (except for the servants) with Tony. By this point, Dorothy is deeply in love. Tony tells her how much he likes her, but then adds that the richest girl in the world "wouldn't have him anyway". Unable to bear being his second choice, she tells him that he would probably succeed if he proposed, so he does. Sylvia, having been forewarned by Dorothy, accepts him.

That night, however, Tony sees Phillip sneaking into Sylvia's room. The next morning, he breaks the engagement. Dorothy claims that Phillip came into her bedroom, putting Tony to the ultimate test. When Phillip shows up for breakfast exceptionally pleased with himself, Tony punches him. Then, finally realizing who he really loves, he picks Dorothy up and carries her off to get married, still not knowing her true identity, and in spite of what he believes she did the night before.

== Cast ==
- Miriam Hopkins as Dorothy Hunter
- Joel McCrea as Anthony "Tony" Travers
- Fay Wray as Sylvia Lockwood
- Henry Stephenson as Jonathan "John" Connors
- Reginald Denny as Phillip Lockwood
- Beryl Mercer as Marie, Dorothy's Maid
- George Meeker as Donald
- Wade Boteler as Jim Franey
- Herbert Bunston as Dean Cavandish, Chief Trustee
- Burr McIntosh as David Preston
- Edgar Norton as Binkley, Dorothy's Butler

== Production ==
Pandro S. Berman produced the film personally while being production head of RKO. He bought the script with his own money when Norman Krasna was being blackballed by Louis B. Mayer at MGM.
