= Bride by Mistake =

1944 film by Richard Wallace

- Theatrical release poster
- Directed by: Richard Wallace
- Written by: Henry Ephron; Phoebe Ephron
- Based on: The Richest Girl in the World by Norman Krasna
- Produced by: Bert Granet
- Starring: Alan Marshal; Laraine Day
- Cinematography: Nicholas Musuraca
- Edited by: Les Millbrook
- Music by: Roy Webb
- Production company: RKO Radio Pictures
- Distributed by: RKO Radio Pictures
- Release date: September 15, 1944
- Running time: 81 minutes
- Country: United States
- Language: English
- Box office: $600,000

Bride by Mistake is a 1944 American romantic comedy film directed by Richard Wallace, and starring Alan Marshal and Laraine Day.

The screenplay is by Phoebe Ephron and Henry Ephron, based on a story by Norman Krasna, and is a remake of The Richest Girl in the World (1934).

== Plot ==
Home from the war, Captain Tony Travis eyes an estate in Santa Barbara and wonders what it must be like to be that rich. It is the property of the fabulously wealthy Nora Hunter, who has secretary and friend Sylvia Lockwood impersonate her in public. Longtime guardian Jonathan Connors protects his ward's privacy zealously. During a ship launch, a press photographer takes Nora's picture, but Connors sees that the camera film is ruined.

Sylvia tells Nora that she is quitting so that she can accompany her husband, Phil Vernon, whose job requires him to move to Washington. Nora decides to marry her fiancé Donald so that Sylvia can be her maid of honor at her wedding. But when Donald returns from military duty, he breaks the news that he has fallen in love with someone else.

Nora hosts tea but has Sylvia pretend to be her again. There, she meets Tony and takes a liking, but he is more interested in Sylvia. On hearing him vow that love is more important to him than money, Nora and Sylvia invite him to a weekend at Nora's beach house. Nora helps Tony court Sylvia, so that if he does genuinely love the real Nora, it will not be because of her money. All of her friends tell her she is being foolish, that nobody can resist that much temptation, but she stubbornly persists.

Mix-ups ensue. While tipsy, Sylvia accepts a marriage proposal from Tony. That night, Tony sees Phil sneak to Sylvia's bedroom for a late night hug. The next morning, he punches the overly cheerful Phil over it. Nora tells him that she and Sylvia switched rooms that night. Despite this "confession", he eventually realizes who he really loves, tosses the protesting Nora over his shoulder and carries her away to get married. On their honeymoon night in a cheap motel, Nora finally reveals her true identity. Tony is disgusted and starts to leave, but then sees her for the first time in her nightgown and stays.

== Cast ==
- Alan Marshal as Captain Tony Travis
- Laraine Day as Nora Hunter
- Marsha Hunt as Sylvia Lockwood
- Allyn Joslyn as Phil Vernon
- Edgar Buchanan as Jonathan Connors
- Michael St. Angel as Lieutenant Stephen Corey
- Marc Cramer as Ross
- William Post Jr. as Donald
- Bruce Edwards as Chaplain
- Nancy Gates as Jane Mason
- Slim Summerville as Samuel
- John Miljan as Major Harvey

== Production ==
The film was a remake of The Richest Girl in the World and was originally entitled That Hunter Girl. Bert Gance produced it at RKO.

In December 1943 Hedda Hopper reported that two stars under contract to David O Selznick, Dorothy McGuire and Alan Marshall would work for RKO on a film the following year – possibly The Fair Barbarian or The Flashing Stream. In January 1944 RKO announced they were going to make a marital comedy I Married the Navy written by Emmett Lavery, who was to co produce with Val Lewton. It would be directed by Richard Wallace and star Marshall and McGuire.

In March 1944 RKO announced they had postponed I Married a Navy due to McGuire's refusal to make it. They substituted it on the studio's schedule with That Hunter Girl which was to star Marshall and Laraine Day and be directed by Wallace.

Producer Bert Gance borrowed Henry Ephron and Phoebe Ephron from Fox to rewrite the script – not to change the structure but to 'jazz it up". The Ephrons had never written a full script before – Fox hired them off the back of the success of a play they had written – so they asked a secretary who had been the best screenwriter to ever work at the studio; she said Norman Krasna. They got every Krasna script they could and copied how he did his scripts.

When they started writing the star was going to be Dorothy McGuire but she was replaced shortly before production by Laraine Day. Henry Ephron said they "had written the part for McGuire's original and somewhat eccentric style (she hardly ever came through the front door; she always climbed in through the window)" but felt Day was "fine. A good enough actress and quite beautiful."

Laraine Day and Marsha Hunt were borrowed from MGM, Alan Marshall was borrowed from David O. Selznick, Allyn Joslyn was borrowed from 20th Century Fox and Edgar Buchanan was borrowed from Columbia. Filming started in March 1944.

The film was called That Hunter Girl but the title was changed to Bride By Mistake in May 1944. Day said she liked making the movie "tremendously. It was the first film designed to make audience laugh for which I had been chosen. I'm hoping this will exert and new and beneficial influence."

== Reception ==
The film made a profit of $600,000.

== See also ==
- List of American films of 1944
