= Minor Watson =

American actor (1889–1965)

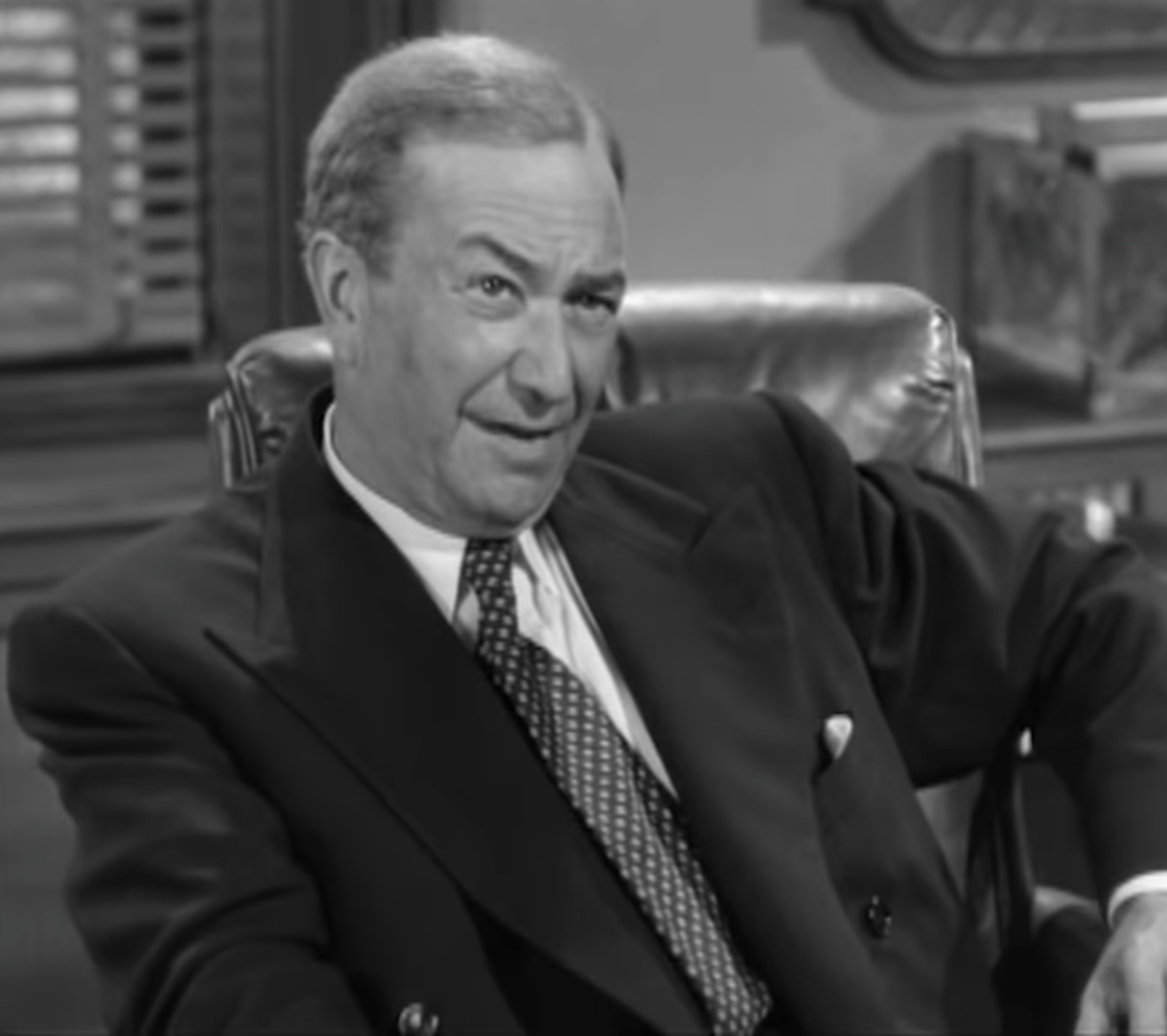
- Watson in The Jackie Robinson Story (1950)
- Born: December 22, 1889; Marianna, Arkansas, U.S.
- Died: July 28, 1965 (aged 75); Alton, Illinois, U.S.
- Resting place: Alton Cemetery, Alton, Illinois
- Occupation: Actor
- Years active: 1912–1959
- Spouse(s): Elinor Hewitt (m. 1919)

Minor Watson (December 22, 1889 – July 28, 1965) was a prominent American character actor, appearing in 111 movies made between 1913 and 1956, mostly portraying patrician authority figures. His first film was 24 Hours (1931) and notable credits includes Boys Town (1938), Yankee Doodle Dandy (1942), Kings Row (1942), Guadalcanal Diary (1943), Bewitched (1945), The Virginian (1946), and The Jackie Robinson Story (1950). His last film role was in The Ambassador's Daughter (1956).

== Early years ==
Watson was the son of Mrs. Alice Rodgers. He attended St. John's Northwestern Military Academy in Delafield, Wisconsin, and Shurtleff College in Alton, Illinois. He said that, as a member of Sigma Phi at Shurtleff, he was encouraged to pursue a career in drama.

== Film ==
Watson began his film career with Essanay Studios in 1913. He was described as "the new recruit that plays lover parts."

In his forty-three-year movie career, Watson appeared in 115 features and short films.

== Stage ==
Watson made seventeen appearances on Broadway in his career, including new plays by George M. Cohan, Robert E, Sherwood, S. N. Behrman, and Howard Lindsay & Russell Crouse. He acted with theatre luminaries such as Ruth Chatterton, Lynn Fontanne and Alfred Lunt, Helen Westley, Walter Abel, Mady Christians, Josephine Hull, Rex Ingram, Ina Claire, Osgood Perkins, and Tom Powers. Fellow actors in his Broadway shows also maintained Hollywood careers: Ralph Bellamy, Humphrey Bogart, Walter Connolly, Melvyn Douglas, Van Heflin, Ruth Hussey, Alan Mowbray, Mildred Natwick, Sidney Toler, and Henry Travers.

Watson's Broadway credits include State of the Union, End of Summer, Tapestry in Gray, A Divine Drudge, Reunion in Vienna, Friendship, This Thing Called Love, These Modern Women, Howdy King, Mismates, The Magnolia Lady, and Why Men Leave Home.

== Personal life ==
Watson married Elinor Hewitt December 7, 1919, in Boston, Massachusetts.

== Death ==
Watson is buried in Alton Cemetery in Alton, Illinois.

== Partial filmography ==
- 24 Hours (1931) as David Melbourn
- Our Betters (1933) as Arthur Fenwick
- Another Language (1933) as Paul Hallam
- The Pursuit of Happiness (1934) as Col. Sherwood
- Babbitt (1934) as Paul 'Paulivus' F. Reisling
- Charlie Chan in Paris (1935) as Renard
- Mister Dynamite (1935) as Clark Lewis
- Mary Jane's Pa (1935) as Kenneth Marvin
- Age of Indiscretion (1935) as Mr. Adams
- Lady Tubbs (1935) as Edward J. Fishbaker
- Pursuit (1935) as Hale
- Annapolis Farewell (1935) as Cmmdre. Briggs
- Rose of the Rancho (1936) as Jonathan Hill
- The Longest Night (1936) as Hardy, Store Security
- When's Your Birthday? (1937) as Regan
- The Woman I Love (1937) as Deschamps
- Dead End (1937) as Mr. Griswald
- That Certain Woman (1937) as Tilden
- Saturday's Heroes (1937) as Doc Thomas
- Navy Blue and Gold (1937) as Lt. Milburn
- Checkers (1937) as Dr. Smith
- Of Human Hearts (1938) as Capt. Griggs
- Love, Honor and Behave (1938) as Dr. 'Mac' MacConaghey
- Fast Company (1938) as Steve Langner
- Boys Town (1938) as The Bishop
- Touchdown, Army (1938) as Col. Denby
- Stablemates (1938) as Barney Donovan
- While New York Sleeps (1938) as Charles MacFarland
- Stand Up and Fight (1939) as U.S. Marshal Cole (uncredited)
- The Adventures of Huckleberry Finn (1939) as Capt. Brandy
- The Flying Irishman (1939) as Airline Personnel Manager (uncredited)
- The Hardys Ride High (1939) as Mr. Terry B. Archer
- Boy Friend (1939) as Capt. Duffy
- Maisie (1939) as Prosecuting Attorney
- News Is Made at Night (1939) as Charles Coulton AKA Clifford Mussey
- The Angels Wash Their Faces (1939) as Maloney
- Here I Am a Stranger (1939) as Evans
- Television Spy (1939) as Burton Lawson
- The Llano Kid (1939) as Sheriff Robert McLane
- Abe Lincoln in Illinois (1940) as Joshua Speed
- Viva Cisco Kid (1940) as Jesse Allen
- 20 Mule Team (1940) as Marshal
- Hidden Gold (1940) as Ed Colby
- Young People (1940) as Dakin
- Rangers of Fortune (1940) as Clem Bowdry
- Gallant Sons (1940) as Barton Newbold
- Western Union (1941) as Pat Grogan
- The Monster and the Girl (1941) as Judge Pulver
- Mr. District Attorney (1941) as Arthur Barret
- Moon Over Miami (1941) as Reynolds
- The Parson of Panamint (1941) as Sheriff Nickerson
- Kiss the Boys Goodbye (1941) as Uncle Jefferson Davis Bethany
- Birth of the Blues (1941) as Henri Lambert
- They Died with Their Boots On (1941) as Senator Smith
- Woman of the Year (1942) as William J. Harding
- Kings Row (1942) as Sam Winters
- Frisco Lil (1942) as Jeff Gray
- The Remarkable Andrew (1942) as District Attorney Orville Beamish
- To the Shores of Tripoli (1942) as Capt. Christopher Winters
- Yankee Doodle Dandy (1942) as Albee
- The Big Shot (1942) as Warden George Booth
- Flight Lieutenant (1942) as Maj. John Thompson (uncredited)
- Enemy Agents Meet Ellery Queen (1942) as Commander Lang
- Gentleman Jim (1942) as Buck Ware
- Power of the Press (1943) as John Cleveland Carter (uncredited)
- Mission to Moscow (1943) as Loy Henderson
- Crash Dive (1943) as Adm. Bob Stewart (uncredited)
- Action in the North Atlantic (1943) as Rear Adm. Williams (uncredited)
- Yanks Ahoy (1943) as Capt. Scott
- Princess O'Rourke (1943) as Mr. Washburn
- Guadalcanal Diary (1943) as Col. Wallace E. Grayson
- Happy Land (1943) as Judge Colvin
- Henry Aldrich, Boy Scout (1944) as Ramsey Kent
- The Falcon Out West (1944) as Dave Colby
- The Story of Dr. Wassell (1944) as Frederick Gordon (uncredited)
- That's My Baby! (1944) as R. P. (Phineas) Moody
- Here Come the Waves (1944) as Superior Officer (uncredited)
- God Is My Co-Pilot (1945) as Col. Caleb V. Haynes
- A Bell for Adano (1945) as Maj. Gen. McKay (uncredited)
- Bewitched (1945) as Edward - the Governor
- You Came Along (1945) as Uncle Jack
- Saratoga Trunk (1945) as J.P. Reynolds (uncredited)
- The Thin Man Goes Home (1945) as Sam Ronson
- Boys' Ranch (1946) as Mr. Harper
- Courage of Lassie (1946) as Sheriff Ed Grayson
- The Virginian (1946) as Judge Henry
- A Southern Yankee (1948) as Gen. Watkins
- Beyond the Forest (1949) as Moose Lawson
- The File on Thelma Jordon (1950) as Judge Calvin H. Blackwell
- The Jackie Robinson Story (1950) as Branch Rickey
- Mister 880 (1950) as Judge O'Neil
- Bright Victory (1951) as Mr. Edward Paterson
- Little Egypt (1951) as Harold P. Cleveland
- As Young as You Feel (1951) as Cyrus Graydon
- My Son John (1952) as Dr. Carver
- Untamed Frontier (1952) as Matt Denbow
- Face to Face (1952) as Scratchy' Wilson ("The Bride Comes to Yellow Sky")
- The Star (1952) as Joe Morrison
- Roar of the Crowd (1953) as Cyrus Mackey
- Ten Wanted Men (1955) as Jason Carr
- The Rawhide Years (1956) as Matt Comfort
- Trapeze (1956) as John Ringling North
- The Ambassador's Daughter (1956) as Gen. Andrew Harvey
