= Louder, Please (play) =

- Written by: Norman Krasna
- Original language: English
- Subject: comedy
- Setting: Publicity Offices of Criterion Pictures, Hollywood

Premiere
- Date premiered: 12 November 1931
- Place premiered: New York

Louder, Please is a play by Norman Krasna, the first of Krasna's plays to be produced on Broadway. It was heavily influenced by The Front Page and also Five Star Final. He wrote it while working as a press agent at Warner Bros. and many of the characters were rumored to be based on real people. Krasna admitted the lead was based on publicity man Hubert Voight and other characters were based on Warners cameraman Buddy Longworth, Bernie Williams and Jack Warner.

The original production was directed by George Abbott and starred Lee Tracy.

The New York Times said "the entertainment spurts out of the direction rather than the play.

It was successful enough for Krasna to be hired as a writer for Columbia Pictures. That studio bought the film rights by March 1932. The film was never made. In March 1962 Edward Buzzell bought the film rights. Again it was not made.

== Plot ==
Publicity men fake the disappearance of a film star who is "lost at sea".
