= The Princess Comes Across =

1936 film by William K. Howard

- theatrical release poster
- Directed by: William K. Howard
- Screenplay by: Walter DeLeon; Francis Martin; Don Hartman; Frank Butler; Claude Binyon (uncredited); J. B. Priestley (uncredited)
- Story by: Philip MacDonald (adaptation)
- Based on: A Halálkabin ("Death Cab") (1934 novel) by Louis Lucien Rogger (Laszlo Aigner and Louis Acze)
- Produced by: Arthur Hornblow Jr.
- Starring: Carole Lombard; Fred MacMurray
- Cinematography: Ted Tetzlaff
- Edited by: Paul Weatherwax
- Music by: Song "My Concertina": Phil Boutelje; Jack Scholl
- Production company: Paramount Pictures
- Distributed by: Paramount Pictures
- Release date: May 22, 1936
- Running time: 75-76 minutes
- Country: United States
- Language: English

The Princess Comes Across is a 1936 American mystery comedy film directed by William K. Howard and starring Carole Lombard and Fred MacMurray, the second of the four times they were paired together. Lombard, playing an actress from Brooklyn pretending to be a Swedish princess, does a "film-length takeoff" on MGM's Swedish star Greta Garbo. The film was based on the 1935 novel A Halálkabin by Louis Lucien Rogger, the pseudonym of Laszlo Aigner and Louis Acze.

== Plot ==
Wanda Nash (Carole Lombard), an actress from Brooklyn, decides to masquerade as "Princess Olga" from Sweden in order to land a film contract with a big Hollywood studio. On board the liner Mammoth bound for New York, she runs into King Mantell (Fred MacMurray), a concertina-playing band leader with a criminal record in his past. Both are blackmailed by Robert M. Darcy (Porter Hall), and after Darcy is killed, they become two of the prime suspects for the murder, and must find the real killer before the five police detectives traveling on the ship can pin it on them.

== Cast ==
- Carole Lombard as Wanda Nash/"Princess Olga"
- Fred MacMurray as King Mantell
- Douglass Dumbrille as Inspector Lorel
- Alison Skipworth as Lady Gertrude Allwyn
- George Barbier as Captain Nicholls
- William Frawley as Benton
- Porter Hall as Robert M. Darcy
- Lumsden Hare as Inspector Cragg
- Sig Ruman as Inspector Steindorf
- Mischa Auer as Inspector Morevitch
- Tetsu Komai as Inspector Kawati
- Gladden James as Ship's Official
- George Chandler as Film Man
- Milburn Stone as Reporter (uncredited)

== Production ==
The Princess Comes Across – which began with the working title Concertina – was initially intended to pair Lombard with George Raft for the third time, but Raft walked out when the studio assigned Ted Tetzlaff to photograph the film. Raft felt that Tetzlaff had made Lombard look better than himself in their earlier film, Rumba, and did not want it to happen again. It was one of many roles Raft rejected after becoming a star.

With Raft out of the picture, and temporarily suspended for his actions, the studio re-teamed Lombard and MacMurray, who had made the screwball comedy Hands Across the Table together in 1935. They would be paired together twice more, in 1937's Swing High, Swing Low and True Confession, made in the same year.

Aside from casting concerns, filming was also delayed by the need for additional dialogue, which caused a change of directors from Harold Young to William K. Howard, and, after filming had begun in February 1936, by conflict between Howard and the producer's assistant.

== Reception ==
Both the film and the stars received good notices. Variety called her Garbo impersonation a "swell characterization and makes a highly diverting [comedy] contrast when the 'princess' lapses into her real self and unloads a line of Brooklynese." Howard Barnes of the New York Herald Tribune praised Lombard's " assured and restrained portrayal – [which] is resourceful in exploiting its comic possibilities" The New York Post's Thornton Delehanty called her Princess the " first role in which we have admired her since the early days of her picture career." Lombard herself liked the film because it "allowed her to do what she had first practiced in childhood days back in Indiana – mimic a figure from the silver screen." However, Frank S. Nugent in his New York Times review called the film a "mild-to-boresome comedy."

== Adaptations ==
The Lux Radio Theater presented a one-hour radio adaptation of the film in December 1938, with Fred MacMurray repeating his role and Madeleine Carroll playing Wanda Nash/Princess Olga.
