= It Happens Every Thursday =

1953 film by Joseph Pevney

- Theatrical release poster
- Directed by: Joseph Pevney
- Written by: Leonard Praskins; Barney Slater (adaptation)
- Screenplay by: Dane Lussier
- Based on: Jane S. McIlvaine (Based upon the novel by)
- Produced by: Leonard Goldstein
- Starring: Loretta Young; John Forsythe
- Cinematography: Russell Metty
- Edited by: Frank Gross
- Color process: Black and white
- Production company: Universal International Pictures
- Distributed by: Universal Pictures
- Release date: April 22, 1953
- Running time: 80 minutes
- Country: United States
- Language: English

It Happens Every Thursday is a 1953 American comedy film directed by Joseph Pevney and starring Loretta Young, John Forsythe, and Frank McHugh, loosely based on the 1951 autobiographical book of the same title by Jane S. McIlvaine. It was Loretta Young's final theater-released film; she switched to television work after this movie. The film cost $617,085 to make, with Young receiving $75,000 for her appearance. After It Happens Every Thursday, Young took a 33-year hiatus from film work of any kind until 1986 when she starred in the TV movie Christmas Eve directed by Stuart Cooper.

== Plot ==
A married couple, Bob and Jane MacAvoy, and their son, Stevie (Harvey Grant), sell everything and move out to California to buy and start up a newspaper company, the Eden Archive. To the surprise of the MacAvoys, the Eden Archive is a bit worse for wear. A pregnant Jane MacAvoy begins to go into labor and gives birth in the upstairs of the Eden Archive to the couple's second child: a daughter. To kickstart their paper, Jane has the idea of putting baby pictures of townspeople in the paper and let people take a shot at who the babies are as a guessing game, making the paper exponentially more popular. This turns into a location guessing game in which a picture of a mansion was shown on the front page. The mansion, unbeknownst to the MacAvoys, is now a prostitution house run by an old lady, Mrs. Holmes, whom the townspeople are not too keen on. This edition of the paper is flamed by the town, leading to the loss of a large number of subscriptions.

Jane, while canvassing the town's businesses to persuade them to purchase ads in the paper, runs into Myron Trout, the owner of a clothing store and presumed villain of the story, whom makes flirtatious advances toward her. Jane quickly rejects the advances and moves on, much to Trout's chagrin.

The MacAvoys decide to socialize within the clubs of the town to gain more supporters. The couple also does a drawing for a new car to anyone who subscribes, leading to even more subscriptions. A drought has been going on for months in Eden, so Bob MacAvoy, after promising in the newspaper to bring rain, intends to employ his Air Force flying experience to use dry ice and cumulous clouds induce rain in Eden. In fact, it starts raining before Bob can conduct his experiment, but Jane, seeing the rain outside, reports in the newspaper that Bob made the rain appear. The rain stays for several days after, flooding the streets, and the town blames Bob for the disaster.

Myron Trout, still upset about Jane's rejection, attempts to get the mayor to kick the MacAvoys out of town. The town holds a meeting asking Bob to reimburse them for rain damage. Bob decides to take his old job back in NYC and the MacAvoys are about to leave when the town has a change of heart and a meteorologist that Jane phoned came and explained that Bob did not in fact cause the rain. The MacAvoys decide to stay in town and buy a new press, continuing the Eden Archive.

The title "It Happens Every Thursday" comes from a line and trope within the film in which their printing press breaks down every Thursday on printing day.

== Cast ==
- Loretta Young as Jane MacAvoy
- John Forsythe as Bob MacAvoy
- Frank McHugh as Fred Hawley
- Edgar Buchanan as Jake
- Gregg Palmer as Chet Dunne (as Palmer Lee)
- Harvey Grant as Steve MacAvoy
- Jane Darwell as Mrs. Eva Spatch
- Willard Waterman as Myron Trout
- Jimmy Conlin as Matthew
- Regis Toomey as Mayor Hull
- Gladys George as Mrs. Holmes
- Kathryn Card as Mrs. Dour
- Edward Clark as Homer
- Eddy Waller as James Bartlett

== Reception ==
The film was met with generally positive reception as a feel-good story that was fine for the whole family. In the film review journal Harrison's Reports, P.S. Harrison states: "A pleasing and amusing comedy-drama that should give good satisfaction to the general run of audiences, particularly the family trade."

In the Motion Picture Herald, it's mentioned that It Happens Every Thursday was "An excellent small town picture. Not particularly strong box office, but all those who saw it enjoyed it."

== Bibliography ==
- Dick, Bernard F. Hollywood Madonna: Loretta Young. University of Mississippi Press, 2011.
