= Lady Harry =

1978 play by Norman Krasna

Lady Harry is a 1978 play by Norman Krasna. It had its world premiere in London.

== Plot ==
An aristocrat is murdered so someone can pretend to be her husband.

== Reception ==
The Guardian called it "dreadful".
