= Ted Tetzlaff =

American cinematographer (1903–1995)

- Born: Dale Herbert Tetzlaff; June 3, 1903; Los Angeles, California, United States
- Died: January 7, 1995 (aged 91); Sausalito, California, United States
- Occupations: Film director, cinematographer
- Years active: 1926-1959

Ted Dale Tetzlaff (born Dale Herbert Tetzlaff; June 3, 1903 – January 7, 1995) was an American Academy Award-nominated cinematographer active in the 1930s and 1940s.

== Career ==
Tetzlaff was particularly favored by the actress Carole Lombard, whom he photographed in 10 films.

After World War II service as a US Army Major, he became a film director, and directed about a dozen films from 1947 to 1957, including the film noir classic The Window (1949).

His father was racecar driver and film stuntman Teddy Tetzlaff (1883–1929).

== Selected filmography ==
=== As cinematographer ===
- Atta Boy (1926)
- Sunshine of Paradise Alley (1926)
- Ragtime (1927)
- Polly of the Movies (1927)
- The Masked Angel (1928)
- The Apache (1928)
- The Power of the Press (1928)
- Into No Man's Land (1928)
- Stool Pigeon (1928)
- The Devil's Cage (1928)
- The Donovan Affair (1929)
- Hurricane (1929)
- The Younger Generation (1929)
- Mexicali Rose (1929)
- Acquitted (1929)
- Behind Closed Doors (1929)
- The Faker (1929)
- Hell's Island (1930)
- Soldiers and Women (1930)
- Personality (1930)
- The Squealer (1930)
- Tol'able David (1930)
- Men in Her Life (1931)
- The Lightning Flyer (1931)
- The Last Parade (1931)
- A Dangerous Affair (1931)
- The Night Club Lady (1932)
- The Night Mayor (1932)
- Man Against Woman (1932)
- This Sporting Age (1932)
- Brief Moment (1933)
- Child of Manhattan (1933)
- Transatlantic Merry-Go-Round (1934)
- Fugitive Lovers (1934)
- Rumba (1935)
- Hands Across the Table (1935)
- Paris in Spring (1935)
- The Princess Comes Across (1936)
- My Man Godfrey (1936)
- Easy Living (1937)
- Swing High, Swing Low (1937)
- True Confession (1937)
- Fools for Scandal (1938)
- Artists and Models Abroad (1938)
- Remember the Night (1940)
- The Mad Doctor (1941)
- The Road to Zanzibar (1941)
- I Married a Witch (1942)
- The Lady is Willing (1942)
- The Talk of the Town (1942) – Academy Award nomination for Best Cinematography
- You Were Never Lovelier (1942)
- The More the Merrier (1943)
- The Enchanted Cottage (1945)
- Notorious (1946)

=== As director ===
- Riffraff (1947)
- Fighting Father Dunne (1948)
- The Window (1949)
- Johnny Allegro (1949)
- A Dangerous Profession (1949)
- The White Tower (1950)
- Gambling House (1951)
- The Treasure of Lost Canyon (1952)
- Terror on a Train (1953) (aka Time Bomb)
- Son of Sinbad (1955)
- The Young Land (1959)
