= Off Broadway (play) =

1982 play by Norman Krasna

Off-Broadway is a 1982 American play by Norman Krasna.

The show's 1982 production by The Whole Theater Company in Montclair, New Jersey was directed by Jose Ferrer.

== Plot ==
Cathy, an actor, falls for David.

== Original cast ==
- Jessica Allen
- James McDonnell
- Barrett Clark
- Renee Roy

== Reception ==
"It tries," said The New York Times.
