= Frisco Lil =

Film directed by Erle C. Kenton

- Theatrical release poster
- Directed by: Erle C. Kenton
- Screenplay by: George Bricker; Michael Jacoby
- Story by: Arthur V. Jones; Dorcas Cochran
- Produced by: Paul Malvern
- Starring: Irene Hervey; Kent Taylor; Minor Watson; Jerome Cowan; Samuel S. Hinds; Milburn Stone
- Cinematography: Charles Van Enger
- Edited by: Otto Ludwig
- Production company: Universal Pictures
- Distributed by: Universal Pictures
- Release date: March 13, 1942
- Running time: 60 minutes
- Country: United States
- Language: English

Frisco Lil is a 1942 American drama film directed by Erle C. Kenton and written by George Bricker and Michael Jacoby. The film stars Irene Hervey, Kent Taylor, Minor Watson, Jerome Cowan, Samuel S. Hinds and Milburn Stone. The film was released on March 13, 1942, by Universal Pictures.

== Plot ==
Law student Lillian Grayson has to interrupt her studies when her casino operating father gets accused of murdering someone. In order to clear his name she goes undercover as dealer in a gambling casino so she can get the information she needs.

== Cast ==
- Irene Hervey as Lillian Grayson / Frisco Lil
- Kent Taylor as Peter Brewster
- Minor Watson as Jeff Gray
- Jerome Cowan as Vince Warren
- Samuel S. Hinds as James Brewster
- Milburn Stone as Mike
- Matty Fain as Garrity
- Claire Whitney as Nell Brewster
- Emmett Lynn as J. B. Devers
- Harry Strang as Red
- Tony Paton as Artie
- Selmer Jackson as McIntyre
- Harry C. Bradley as Judge
- Gus Glassmire as Herrington
- Paul McVey as Cornell
