= Love in E-Flat =

1967 comedy play by Norman Krasna

- Original language: English
- Written by: Norman Krasna
- Genre: comedy
- Setting: A converted brownstone on the east side of New York City. Mid-June

Premiere
- Date: 8 February 1967
- Place: Brooks Atkinson Theatre, New York

Love in E-Flat is a 1967 comedy play by Norman Krasna.

== Plot ==
Teacher Amy is having an affair with intern Howard. He is jealous of her and bugs her apartment with a listening attack.

== Original production ==
In August 1966 it was announced the production would be produced by Alfred de Liagre. The producer said he selected it over 500 other plays and liked that it was not concerned with the theatre of the absurd, the theatre of cruelty or theatre of sexual deviation. The following month George Seaton signed to direct; it was Seaton's first show for the legitimate theatre.

By November Hal Buckley and Kathleen Nolan were cast.

It opened February 13, 1967. "It's mild" said Walter Kerr of the New York Times. "It's full of mild people... it's very discrete about its jokes... polite, professional, placid."

The play closed March 4, 1967 after 24 performances.

== Later productions ==
The play went to Los Angeles in 1969.

Elke Sommer appeared in a 1972 production in Chicago.

The Los Angeles Times called a 1975 production "pleasant, rather bland."

== Film adaptation ==
In September 1970 Lawrence Kasha bought the film rights and hired Krasna to write a script. However no movie resulted.
