= Hands Across the Table =

1935 film by Mitchell Leisen

- Theatrical release poster
- Directed by: Mitchell Leisen
- Screenplay by: Norman Krasna; Vincent Lawrence; Herbert Fields
- Story by: Viña Delmar
- Produced by: E. Lloyd Sheldon
- Starring: Carole Lombard; Fred MacMurray; Astrid Allwyn; Ralph Bellamy
- Cinematography: Ted Tetzlaff
- Edited by: William Shea
- Music by: Friedrich Hollaender; John Leipold; Heinz Roemheld
- Production company: Paramount Pictures
- Distributed by: Paramount Pictures
- Release dates: October 17, 1935 (Baltimore, Maryland); October 18, 1935 (United States)
- Running time: 80 minutes
- Country: United States
- Language: English

Hands Across the Table is a 1935 American romantic screwball comedy film directed by Mitchell Leisen and released by Paramount Pictures. It stars Carole Lombard as a manicurist looking for a rich husband and Fred MacMurray as an impoverished playboy, with Ralph Bellamy as a wealthy former pilot in a wheelchair. The teaming of Lombard and MacMurray was so well received, they went on to make three more films together, The Princess Comes Across (1936), Swing High, Swing Low (1937), and True Confession (1937).

== Plot ==
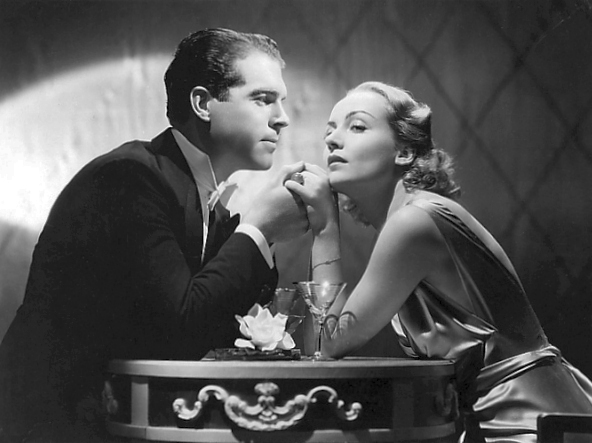
Fred MacMurray and Carole Lombard in Hands Across the Table

Brought up in poverty, New York City hotel manicurist Regi Allen is determined to marry a rich husband. Her new client, wheelchair-using hotel guest Allen Macklyn, is immediately attracted to her and becomes her confidant. Despite his obvious wealth, Regi does not view him as a potential husband, and has no qualms about telling him about her goal in life.

Exiting his penthouse suite, Regi encounters a man playing hopscotch in the hallway, and declines his invitation to join him. He makes an appointment for a manicure as Theodore Drew III, scion of a socially prominent family. Unaware that the Drews were bankrupted by the Great Depression, she accepts his invitation to dinner.

They have a good time, but Ted drinks too much and tells Regi that he is engaged to Vivian Snowden, heiress to a pineapple fortune. When Regi is unable to wake him from his drunken stupor, she lets him sleep on her sofa. He explains to her that he was supposed to sail to Bermuda the previous night (a trip paid for by his future father-in-law) and that he has nowhere to stay and no money. Regi reluctantly lets him live in her apartment until his boat returns from Bermuda, at which time he can return to sponging off of Vivian. Regi and Ted confess to each other that they intend to marry for money.

Regi and Ted play pranks on each other. In the first one, Ted scares off Regi's date by pretending to be her abusive husband. Later, in order to convince Vivian that he is in Bermuda, Ted persuades Regi to telephone Vivian while posing as a Bermuda telephone operator. When Regi repeatedly interrupts in a nasally voice, Ted hangs up to avoid laughing in his fiancée's hearing. However, this backfires, as Vivian discovers that the call came from New York when she tries to reconnect.

In the course of their stay together, Regi and Ted fall in love. On their last night before the boat returns, they admit their mutual love, but Regi ends the relationship, insisting that Ted would resent having given up his chance to be wealthy if he were to marry her. Early the next morning, Ted leaves without saying goodbye.

Under the pretense of a manicure appointment, Vivian asks to see Regi in her hotel room and soon confronts her, revealing that she hired private investigators to discover why Ted lied about Bermuda. Regi then goes to her regular appointment in Allen's suite, where he consoles her as she breaks down in tears. Allen had intended to propose to her, but he secretly puts away his engagement ring after she confesses she has fallen in love for Ted.

In Vivian's room, she tells Ted that she is still willing to proceed with the marriage. Ted, however, asks to be released from their engagement, declaring that he is willing to earn a living. When Ted finds Regi in Allen's suite, she agrees to marry him. On a double-decker bus, Regi and Ted discuss what they should do first: eat lunch, get married, or find a job for Ted. They toss a coin to decide; Ted jokingly says he will look for a job if it stands on edge. When the coin flies off the bus, Regi and Ted find that it has landed on its edge in a manhole cover.

== Cast ==
- Carole Lombard as Regi Allen
- Fred MacMurray as Theodore "Ted" Drew III
- Ralph Bellamy as Allen Macklyn
- Astrid Allwyn as Vivian Snowden
- Ruth Donnelly as Laura, Regi's boss and friend
- Marie Prevost as Nona, Regi's friend and a strong believer in numerology
- William Demarest as Natty, Regi's date (uncredited)

== Production ==
The film was intended primarily as a vehicle to promote Lombard's comedic acting abilities. She had originally wanted Cary Grant in the role of Theodore Drew III, but scheduling conflicts made him impossible to get.

MacMurray was not known for his comedic acting abilities and found it difficult to be humorous enough for the role. Director Mitchell Leisen and Lombard both worked extremely hard to get the performance they wanted out of him. Lombard at one point sat on MacMurray's chest, pounding on him with her fists and yelling, "Now Uncle Fred, you be funny or I'll pluck your eyebrows out!" Lombard and MacMurray were unable to create the chemistry that they had with various other on-screen partners. Leisen said, "The main problem with Fred in those days was that he didn't project much sex, aside from being very good looking. In the scene where he says 'Aren't you going to kiss me good-night?' Carole was supposed to walk in and kiss him, then walk out of the frame. Well, she came out past the camera, just looked at me and shrugged her shoulders, as if to say, 'So what?' Poor Fred!" Lombard and MacMurray liked each other immensely, Lombard going to parties at the MacMurrays' house and vice versa. With Leisen's direction, they were able to project their genial relationship onto the screen. Of the scene in which MacMurray calls his fiancée and Lombard continuously interrupts stating "Bermuda calling," Leisen said, "When they finished the take, Carole and Fred collapsed on the floor in laughter; they laughed until they couldn't laugh any more. It wasn't in the script, but I made sure the cameras kept turning and I used it in the picture. It is so hard to make actors laugh naturally – I wasn't about to throw that bit out."

== Critical reception ==
The New York Times reviewer Andre Sennwald called it "an uproariously funny romantic comedy, with a brilliant screen play", with "some of the best dialogue that has come out of Hollywood in many months".
