= Parole Girl =

1933 film by Edward F. Cline

- Directed by: Edward Cline
- Screenplay by: Norman Krasna
- Story by: Norman Krasna
- Starring: Mae Clarke; Ralph Bellamy
- Cinematography: Benjamin H. Kline
- Production company: Columbia Pictures
- Distributed by: Columbia Pictures
- Release date: March 4, 1933 (United States)
- Running time: 67 minutes
- Country: United States
- Language: English

Parole Girl is a 1933 American pre-Code romantic drama film directed by Edward Cline. The film stars Mae Clarke and Ralph Bellamy.

== Plot ==
When Sylvia Day is caught trying to pull a scam on the Taylor Department Store in New York City, she pleads with the store manager to let her go, but his boss, Joe Smith, insists on following store policy, and she is handed over to the police, convicted and sentenced to a year in prison. Sylvia is consumed with the idea of getting revenge on Joe.

She becomes friends with chatty fellow inmate Jeanie Vance, who offers to team up with her and commit more crimes once they have served their time. When Sylvia learns that Jeanie has a surprising connection to Joe, she decides to get out early. She sets a fire, then passes out from the smoke while trying to put it out. For her "heroism", she is granted parole.

Tony Gratton, her partner in the failed con, tries to talk her into marrying him and going to Chicago to continue their life of crime, but she is determined to avenge herself. Besides, she knows that Tony is already married.

Sylvia stalks Joe, learning all she can about him. Then, she pretends to be an old acquaintance at a nightclub where Joe is celebrating his promotion to general manager by getting drunk. The next morning, Joe discovers her in his apartment. She informs him that they have gotten married. Joe laughs, then tells her that he already has a wife. She tells him she knows (it is Jeanie), then reveals her motives. Tony shows up, masquerading as the person who married them; he gives Joe the marriage license the couple supposedly left behind. Threatened with a charge of bigamy, Joe reluctantly agrees to support Sylvia for a year, the length of her parole.

Tony tries again to get Sylvia to be his partner in crime. When she refuses, he slips a counterfeit $20 bill in her purse. Sylvia goes on a shopping spree and pays for some of her purchases with the bill. Joe is unhappy when he sees all her purchases and asks her to be reasonable in light of his paycheque and send them back to the store. She was going to do it, but then changes her mind. The fake money is traced back to her, but when a policeman shows up to take her back to jail, Joe pretends that she took the money out of his pants pocket. As a store manager, he deals with counterfeit money all the time. His ploy to win her over with kindness works and Sylvia sends back her extravagant purchases.

Later, Joe calls her from the office and asks her for a favor. Mr. Taylor, the store's somewhat eccentric owner, has found out that Joe is married, so he is coming to dinner at their apartment. While Sylvia is cooking, Jeanie arrives. Her friend has been released early and intends to blackmail her husband (whom she married long ago while he was in college and then lost track of), once she can locate him, before heading to Florida with Sylvia. Sylvia gets her to leave before Joe and Mr. Taylor show up (early) by promising to give her a decision the next day. Taylor insists on doing the cooking; he is fed up with being waited on by servants. He becomes very fond of the couple and hints at a promotion to vice president if they were to have a baby.

The next day, Sylvia persuades Jeanie that it is too dangerous to try blackmail in New York because of her record and agrees to go with her to Florida. Sylvia leaves a letter for Joe explaining everything, ending with the admission "I love you". On the train, however, Jeanie reveals that she divorced Joe without his knowledge. Sylvia gets off and rushes back to the apartment; Joe has already read the letter and takes her in his arms.

== Cast ==
- Mae Clarke as Sylvia
- Ralph Bellamy as Smith
- Marie Prevost as Jeanie
- Hale Hamilton as Tony
- Ferdinand Gottschalk as Taylor
- Ernest Wood as Manager
- Sam Godfrey as Walsh

== Production ==
Krasna was assigned to work on the script in August 1932.

The film was announced in January 1933.

== Preservation ==
A print is held in the Library of Congress collection.
