= Time for Elizabeth =

Play written by Groucho Marx

- Original language: English
- Written by: Norman Krasna; Groucho Marx
- Genre: comedy

Premiere
- Date: 1948, as April Fool in tryout run
- Place: San Francisco

Time for Elizabeth is a 1948 play written by Norman Krasna and Groucho Marx.

Krasna and Marx were good friends and Krasna says writing it took 10 to 15 years. There is no character named Elizabeth in Time for Elizabeth; it refers to Elizabeth, New Jersey, where one of the characters will retire: "It's time for Elizabeth."

The cast was studded with veteran stage and screen actors: Otto Kruger in the lead, Katherine Alexander as his wife, and Russell Hicks, Lela Bliss, Johnny Arthur, Leonard Mudie, and Harlan Briggs in support.

== Plot ==
Mr. MacPherson, longtime employee of the Snow-Drift Washing Machine Company, receives a gold watch upon his retirement and looks forward to an idyllic life of leisure in Elizabeth, New Jersey. Ed Davis, vice president of the company, is intrigued by Mr. MacPherson's plans. Davis becomes angry with company president Walter P. Schaeffer and quits his job. Davis retires to Florida with his wife Kay, and has to cope with boredom, new neighbors, and living on a retirement income. When Davis loses his nest egg, he can't stand his new life anymore. Fortunately his old boss Schaeffer begs him to come back to the company in New York, at a higher salary.

== Production and reception ==
The original production was titled April Fool, and had a tryout run in San Francisco during the late summer of 1948. Philip K. Scheuer of the Los Angeles Times wrote, "The audience present to receive it found it wanting in some respects. April Fool is made up of a sequence of incidents rather than a play with a beginning, a middle, and an end, so that it almost always seems like the outline of a dramatic concept which the authors intend to fill in later. April Fool doesn't strike me as much of a piece of theater, and especially not much when its authorship is considered." Scheuer's comment regarding a script that "the authors intend to fill in later" was perceptive: playwrights Krasna and Marx kept tinkering with the book, changing the title to Time for Elizabeth for its imminent Broadway opening.

The play opened at the Fulton Theatre in New York, and ran for only eight performances, from September 27 to October 2, 1948. Critics were very disappointed, and didn't hesitate to say so. Brooks Atkinson at The New York Times grumbled, "Mr. Marx has everyone's permission to throw down the pen and put back the moustachio any time he pleases." John Chapman of the New York Daily News expected much more from the authors: "Here were two funnymen who had turned out a family-trade comedy which could have been done better by the late Frank Craven 25 years ago. Strictly magazine-fiction stuff... Don't retire to Florida, or you may have to play shuffleboard with Groucho Marx and Norman Krasna." Variety said, "It registers as just another box-office failure, [with] only occasionally effective scenes or funny dialogue." Syndicated columnist Lee Evans wrote, "The comedy is just too thin for a full-length evening. The excellence of its acting keeps it together for the usual time. But there are interludes when even an excellent actor is unable to pep up a part. One scene of a bridge party is about as inane and inept attempt at comedy as even the rankest tyro would think to incorporate in a play." Even The Wall Street Journal chimed in: "Time for Elizabeth is leisurely, even sparse, as to the frequency of its comic moments, but when they arrived they seemed to excite Monday night's audience not a little. In fact, I am inclined to think the Krasna-Marx offering may please the public a bit more than it has the critics."

== Revivals ==
The screen rights were sold to Warner Bros. for $500,000 in 1955, but the film version was never made.

The play toured as a summer stock production during the summers of 1957, 1958, 1959, and 1963, with co-author Groucho Marx playing the lead and Eden Hartford (Mrs. Marx) as his leading lady. True to form, Marx continued to tinker with the script; columnist Earl Wilson reported, "Groucho Marx says he's added 80 laughs to his play Time for Elizabeth". Thanks to Marx's presence and the additional jokes, the tours were well received.

Time for Elizabeth was later adapted for television, abridged for a one-hour time slot, with Marx playing the lead. It was aired by NBC as part of a Bob Hope anthology series on April 19, 1964. "I've never played this kind of a character on TV and I thought it would be interesting," Marx told reporter Elizabeth Sullivan. "I don't want to do real low comedy anymore. I've had that. Every comedian wants to play Hamlet and I would like to do some dramatic parts."
