= Mr. & Mrs. Smith (1941 film) =

1941 film by Alfred Hitchcock

- Theatrical release poster
- Directed by: Alfred Hitchcock
- Written by: Norman Krasna
- Produced by: Harry E. Edington
- Starring: Carole Lombard; Robert Montgomery; Gene Raymond; Jack Carson; Philip Merivale; Lucile Watson
- Cinematography: Harry Stradling
- Edited by: William Hamilton
- Music by: Edward Ward
- Production company: RKO Radio Pictures
- Distributed by: RKO Radio Pictures
- Release date: January 31, 1941
- Running time: 95 minutes
- Country: United States
- Language: English
- Budget: $743,000
- Box office: $1.4 million

Mr. & Mrs. Smith is a 1941 American screwball comedy film directed by Alfred Hitchcock, written by Norman Krasna, and starring Carole Lombard and Robert Montgomery. It also features Gene Raymond, Jack Carson, Philip Merivale, and Lucile Watson.

Mr. & Mrs. Smith was the only pure comedy Hitchcock made in the United States. Although he later claimed to have done it only as a favor to Lombard, files at RKO show that Hitchcock actively pursued the project.

== Plot ==
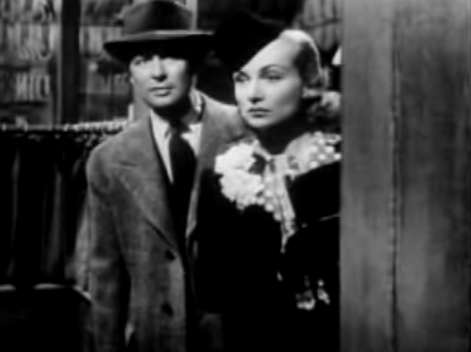
Robert Montgomery and Carole Lombard

Ann and David Smith are a married couple living in New York City who, though in love, have disagreements that last for days before they reconcile.

One morning, Ann asks David if he would marry her again if he had it to do over. Although he says he is very happy with her now and would not marry anyone else, he says he would not, because it meant the loss of his freedom and independence.

Later that day, Harry Deever, an Idaho county official, informs David at work that due to a jurisdictional mishap, their three-year marriage in Idaho was not valid. Since Deever is a family acquaintance of Ann's from Idaho, he stops by their apartment to tell Ann and her mother the same thing. Ann does not mention this to David, believing he will remarry her that very night when he invites her to a romantic dinner at the restaurant they frequented before they were married.

When they arrive at the restaurant, it has declined in quality and become rundown. While there, David does not bring up the subject of marriage, and they eventually return home. Ann grows impatient and confronts David, accusing him of not wanting to marry her again. David protests and claims he was going to ask her shortly, but Ann dismisses him and kicks him out of their apartment.

David spends the night at his club, but when he goes home after work the next day, Ann's maid refuses him entry. David waits in the lobby and sees Ann return with an older gentleman. Believing the man is her suitor, David becomes angry and disheartened. He intercepts Ann and threatens to withhold financial support. He gets her fired from her new job (the older gentleman is both her suitor and her new boss). Ann tells David she has no intention of ever marrying him again.

David's friend and law partner, Jefferson "Jeff" Custer, tells David he will talk to Ann and persuade her to remarry. However, when David arrives that evening, he finds that Jeff has instead agreed to legally represent Ann and goes through the various legal outcomes. Jeff asks Ann to dinner the following night in David's presence. David tells Ann that if she agrees to the date their marriage is over, but Ann accepts the invitation.

After dinner, Ann and Jeff go to the 1939 New York World's Fair, but they become stuck on the parachute ride and are exposed to hours of rain many feet up in the air. When they go back to Jeff's apartment, he plans to put on dry clothes and return to the fair, but Ann feeds the teetotaler "medicinal" liquor ostensibly to prevent a cold, and he becomes drunk. Ann returns home.

Ann and Jeff continue to date and meet Jeff's parents. They decide to take a vacation with Jeff's parents at a Lake Placid skiing resort, the same resort where Ann and David had earlier been planning to holiday. Upon arriving at the resort, they find that David has rented a cabin next to theirs. When confronted, David faints. David pretends to be sick and delirious while Ann fawns over him. When Ann discovers his deception, she becomes furious. While they engage in a heated argument, Jeff walks in. He knows Ann and David are meant for each other when Ann tries to manipulate Jeff into fighting David.

Ann decides she wants to get away to the lodge by ski, even though she does not know how to ski. David offers to help her put on her skis, but instead places her in a position that prevents her from standing up. As she struggles and threatens him, she frees one foot, but then feigns helplessness by reattaching the ski. David realizes her pretense, and silences her ranting by kissing her.

== Cast ==
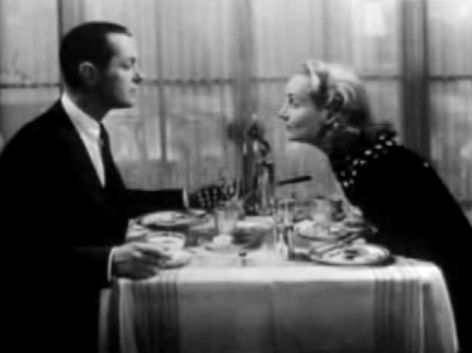
Robert Montgomery and Carole Lombard

- Carole Lombard as Ann Smith
- Robert Montgomery as David Smith
- Gene Raymond as Jefferson Custer
- Jack Carson as Chuck Benson
- Philip Merivale as Ashley Custer
- Lucile Watson as Mrs. Custer
- William Tracy as Sammy
- Charles Halton as Harry Deever
- Esther Dale as Mrs. Krausheimer
- Emma Dunn as Martha
- Betty Compson as Gertie
- Patricia Farr as Gloria
- William Edmunds as proprietor at Lucy's
- Adele Pearce as Lily
- Emory Parnell as Conway (uncredited)

Alfred Hitchcock can be seen passing Montgomery in front of his apartment building—walking from left to right and smoking a cigar—as the camera pulls back, at 42:58 minutes into the film. To the delight of the crew, Lombard herself directed Hitchcock in the brief scene, forcing him to redo his very simple part many times.

== Production ==
Norman Krasna came up with the basic idea of Mr. & Mrs. Smith (under the original working titles of Who Was That Lady I Seen You With? and No for an Answer) and pitched it to Carole Lombard, who was enthusiastic. She sold the idea to George J. Schaefer of RKO who agreed to buy the project from Krasna, then Alfred Hitchcock became involved. In the 1939 interview What I Do to the Stars, Hitchcock is about to leave England for Hollywood and says he would like to make a film with Lombard, casting her not in one of her superficial comedies, but in a serious role, because he believes she could be as good a serious actor as Paul Muni or Leslie Howard. The result was Mr. and Mrs. Smith. Hitchcock was never happy with the result and was later dismissive of the film.

Mr. & Mrs. Smith was the last film released before Lombard's death. To Be or Not to Be (1942) was her final film, released two months after she died in an aircraft crash while on a War Bond tour.

The film is one of the earliest to show a pizzeria and was supposed to contain sounds of a toilet flushing, which was altered to banging pipes for reasons of censorship.

== Reception ==
Mr. & Mrs. Smith made a profit of $750,000. When the film premiered at the Radio City Music Hall, the review in The New York Times described it thus: "Despite the performances, despite the endless camera magic with which Mr. Hitchcock tries to conceal the thinness of his material, Mr. and Mrs. Smith have their moments of dullness. The result is a chucklesome comedy that fails to mount into a coruscating wave of laughter." Variety reviewers were more enthusiastic about the film, noting: "Alfred Hitchcock ... pilots the story in a straight farcical groove—with resort to slapstick interludes or overplaying by the characters. Pacing his assignment at a steady gait, Hitchcock catches all of the laugh values from the above par script of Norman Krasna."

On the review aggregator website Rotten Tomatoes, Mr. & Mrs. Smith holds an approval rating of 64% based on 22 reviews, with an average rating of 5.8/10.

== Adaptations in other media ==
Lux Radio Theatre adapted Mr. & Mrs. Smith to radio on June 9, 1941, with Carole Lombard and Bob Hope. The Screen Guild Theater next adapted it on February 8, 1942, with Errol Flynn and Lana Turner, again on December 14, 1942 with Joan Bennett, Robert Young, and Ralph Bellamy, and once more on January 1, 1945, with Preston Foster, Louise Allbritton, and Stuart Erwin. On January 30, 1949, it was adapted to Screen Director's Playhouse with Robert Montgomery, Mary Jane Croft, and Carleton Young.
