= My Geisha =

1962 film by Jack Cardiff

- Theatrical release poster
- Directed by: Jack Cardiff
- Written by: Norman Krasna
- Produced by: Steve Parker
- Starring: Shirley MacLaine; Yves Montand; Edward G. Robinson; Bob Cummings
- Cinematography: Shunichiro Nakao
- Edited by: Archie Marshek
- Music by: Franz Waxman
- Production companies: Paramount Pictures Corporation and Sachiko Productions, Inc.
- Distributed by: Paramount Pictures
- Release dates: 18 January 1962 (World Premiere, London)
- Running time: 119 minutes
- Country: United States
- Language: English
- Budget: $2 million

My Geisha is a 1962 American comedy-drama film directed by Jack Cardiff, starring Shirley MacLaine, Yves Montand, Edward G. Robinson, and Bob Cummings and released by Paramount Pictures. Written by Norman Krasna, based on Krasna's story of the same name, the film was produced and copyrighted in 1961 by MacLaine's then-husband Steve Parker. The world premiere was at the Plaza Theatre in London's West End on January 18, 1962.

== Plot ==
Paul Robaix, a famous director, wants to film the Puccini opera on location in Japan under the title Madame Butterfly, with the dialogue spoken in English by the actors and the score sung in Italian by the best singers of opera available. His wife, Lucy Dell, has been the leading lady in all of his greatest films, and she is more famous. He feels that she overshadows him and he yearns to achieve success independent of her. By choosing to film Madame Butterfly, he can select a different leading lady without hurting her feelings, because she, as a blue-eyed, red-headed comedy actress, would not be suitable to play a Japanese woman in a tragedy. As a surprise, she visits him in Japan while he's searching for a leading lady. To surprise him further, she disguises herself as a geisha at a dinner party, planning to unveil her identity during the meal.

But she is delighted to discover that everyone at the dinner party, including her husband, believes her to be a Japanese woman. She learns that the studio has decided to give her husband just enough funds to film the movie in black and white, with inexpensive singers, because there are no big stars in the film. She decides to audition for the role of Butterfly with the studio's knowledge but without telling her husband. Then the studio will give him the budget he needs to make the film he wants.

Lucy gets the part and is wonderful. Through the course of the film, she begins to be concerned that Yoko will steal her husband's affections, though he never does develop feelings for the invented character.

When viewing the film's negatives, in which colors are reversed, he sees through her duplicity and, believing that she plans to steal credit from him, once again depriving him of the artistic praise he deserves, he becomes furious. To retaliate, he propositions Yoko. Greatly distressed, Lucy flees. He tells the movie's producer, Sam Lewis, that he has just learned the truth and makes Sam promise not to tell Lucy—or anyone. Their love affair is over. Broken hearted, Lucy gives a brilliant performance in the last scene, but she comes up weeping on Sam's shoulder.

Their "reunion" before the premiere is awkward and cold. Paul believes she will expose her identity there, betraying him, and Lucy believes that her husband wanted to sleep with Yoko. Her original plan was to come on stage as Yoko and pull off her wig at the end of the premiere, astounding Hollywood and virtually guaranteeing her an Academy Award. While "Un bel di, vedremo" plays, Lucy goes backstage to put on her geisha costume. Her trusted friend, Kazumi, gives her a present—an ivory fan that was owned by a very famous geisha. The fan is inscribed with a proverb: "No one before you, my husband, not even I." The film reaches its tragic ending and receives a standing ovation. Paul thanks the audience and introduces Yoko Mori. Lucy appears as herself and announces that Yoko has gone into a convent. They walk to each other across the width of the stage. As they bow to waves of thunderous applause, he calls her "my geisha", revealing that he knew Yoko was Lucy when he propositioned her, and she weeps tears of joy.

== Cast ==
- Shirley MacLaine as Lucy Dell
- Yves Montand as Paul Robaix
- Edward G. Robinson as Sam Lewis
- Bob Cummings as Bob Moore
- Yoko Tani as Kazumi Ito
- Tatsuo Saito as Kenichi Takata
- Tamae Kiyokawa as Amatsu Hisako
- I. Hayakawa as Hisako
- Alex Gerry as Leonard Lewis, Hollywood producer
- Tsugundo Maki as Shiga

=== Vocals ===
- Vocals for "Butterfly" by Michiko Sunahara
- Vocals for "Lieutenant Pinkerton" by Barry Morell

== Production ==
In June 1959, MacLaine signed to make the movie. In July 1959, Krasna signed to write the film.

In August 1960, it was announced the film would star MacLaine, James Stewart, Maria Callas, Gig Young, and Edward G. Robinson and be directed by Jack Cardiff.

Cummings was cast in December 1960. It was a rare villain part for him.

Edith Head was nominated for an Academy Award for her costume designs.

Filming started in Japan 16 January 1961.

== Reception ==
In his June 14, 1962, review for The New York Times, Bosley Crowther found the film “visually beautiful,” ..."but unfortunately it does not have too much to say”. ”… scenic loveliness and Puccini's haunting music make solid support for the rather thin saga.” He praises MacLaine... (who is) “more subdued than normal and contributes a performance in keeping with the stylized, formal nature of the geisha. She appears, above all, at ease in the role, (unlike) Yves Montand … (who) still appears to find English and his surroundings somewhat uncomfortable. …Yoko Tani, as a perceptive geisha who teaches our heroine.., and Tatsuo Saito are among the native players who add authenticity to the proceedings…”

== See also ==
- Examples of yellowface
