= The Ambassador's Daughter =

1956 film by Norman Krasna

- Directed by: Norman Krasna
- Written by: Norman Krasna
- Produced by: Norman Krasna
- Starring: Olivia de Havilland; John Forsythe; Myrna Loy; Adolphe Menjou
- Cinematography: Michel Kelber
- Edited by: Roger Dwyre
- Music by: Jacques Météhen
- Production company: Norman Krasna Productions
- Distributed by: United Artists
- Release date: July 26, 1956
- Running time: 103 minutes
- Country: United States
- Language: English
- Budget: $1,250,000
- Box office: $1.5 million (US)

The Ambassador's Daughter is a 1956 American romantic comedy film directed by Norman Krasna and starring Olivia de Havilland, John Forsythe and Myrna Loy. It was also produced and written by Krasna, and was distributed by United Artists. It was shot at the Joinville Studios in Paris. The film's sets were designed by the art director Léon Barsacq.

== Plot ==
When a visiting American senator decides to make Paris off-limits to enlisted military personnel, the daughter of the United States Ambassador to France decides to show him that American servicemen can be gentlemen by dating one of them without revealing her lofty social status. Staff Sergeant Sullivan takes Joan to colorful nightclub cabarets, and on a comical trip up the Eiffel Tower, all the time believing her to be a Dior fashion model.

Thinking she has an emergency back in America, Sullivan offers to buy her an airline ticket, for which she is grateful, until she hears that counterfeit plane tickets are a common scam used by American servicemen to impress girls. Sullivan's friend, the homespun Private First Class O'Connor, all the while is a guest of the Ambassador's family and other top brass, and tries to alert Sullivan as to Joan's true identity, but is unable to contact Sullivan (and is sworn to secrecy).

When Sullivan drops into the Dior fashion show one day to look for Joan, he discovers that the staff have never heard of her. However he sees Joan observing the show with her father's friend, the Senator, whom he mistakenly assumes must be her sugar daddy. On their last dinner date, Joan walks out on Sullivan, when he accidentally spills wine on her and offers to take her to his hotel room, thinking he is dishonorable. Finally, one evening Sullivan and the Ambassador's family, by coincidence, separately attend the same ballet performance of Swan Lake, where during the intermission Sullivan learns her true identity and their misunderstanding is resolved.

== Cast ==
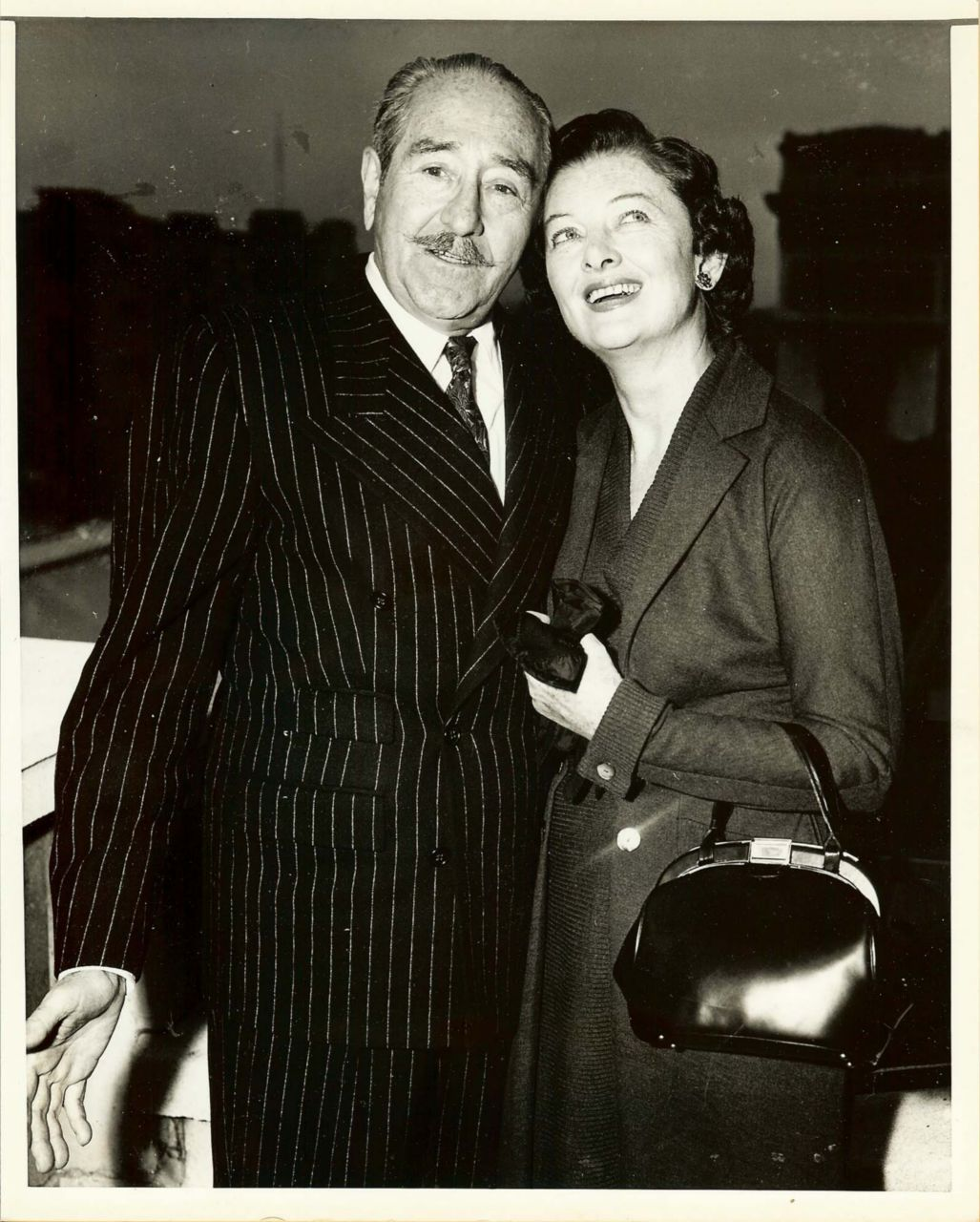
Promotional photo of Adolphe Menjou and Myrna Loy for The Ambassador's Daughter

- Olivia de Havilland as Joan Fisk
- John Forsythe as Sergeant Danny Sullivan
- Myrna Loy as Mrs. Cartwright
- Adolphe Menjou as Senator Jonathan Cartwright
- Tommy Noonan as Corporal Al O'Connor, Danny's friend
- Francis Lederer as Prince Nicholas Obelski
- Edward Arnold as Ambassador William Fisk
- Minor Watson as General Andrew Harvey. This was Watson's last film.
- Michel Renault as danseur in 'Swan Lake'
- Claude Bessy as ballerina in 'Swan Lake'

== Production ==
In February 1954 Krasna announced he would write and direct an original film for Jerry Wald at Columbia Pictures, Speak to Me of Love. Gene Tierney was to star. In March the title changed to The Ambassador's Daughter. In April 1954 the deal with Columbia was called off. In January 1955 Van Johnson was announced for the male lead. The film ended up not being made at Columbia - in February 1955 Krasna signed a two picture deal to write and direct at United Artists; the first was to be The Ambassador's Daughter and the second was Red Roses. The latter ended up not being made. Olivia de Havilland signed in June. Johnson ended up not appearing in the movie; John Forsythe was cast the following month. Adolphe Menjou joined the film in September.

== See also ==
- List of American films of 1956
