= John Forsythe =

American actor (1918–2010)

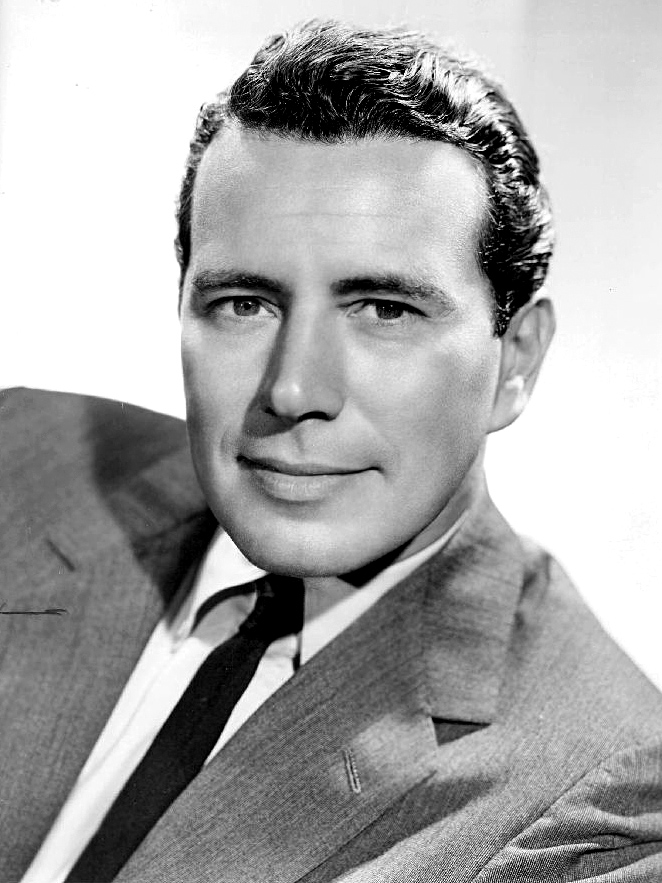
- Forsythe in 1957
- Born: John Lincoln Freund; January 29, 1918; Penns Grove, New Jersey, U.S.
- Died: April 1, 2010 (aged 92); Santa Ynez, California, U.S.
- Resting place: Oak Hill Cemetery, Ballard, California, U.S.
- Education: University of North Carolina at Chapel Hill
- Occupations: Actor; producer; narrator; drama teacher
- Years active: 1943–2006
- Spouses: Parker Worthington McCormick (m. 1939; div. 1943) Julie (Wagner) Warren (m. 1943; died 1994) Nicole Carter (m. 2002)
- Children: 3
- Awards: Golden Globe Award (1983, 1984); Golden Apple Award (1984); Soap Opera Digest Award (1984); TV Land Award (2007); Walk of Fame (Television, 1960)

John Lincoln Forsythe (né Freund; January 29, 1918 – April 1, 2010) was an American stage, film, and television actor, producer, narrator, and drama teacher whose career spanned six decades. He also appeared as a guest on several talk and variety shows and as a panelist on numerous game shows.

In 1943, he signed up with Warner Bros. as a minor contract player, but he starred in The Captive City (1952) and co-starred opposite Loretta Young in It Happens Every Thursday (1953), Edmund Gwenn and Shirley MacLaine in The Trouble with Harry (1955), and Olivia de Havilland in The Ambassador's Daughter (1956).

Forsythe also enjoyed a long successful television career, starring in three television series in three genres: as the single playboy father Bentley Gregg in the sitcom Bachelor Father (1957–1962); as the unseen millionaire Charles Townsend in the crime drama Charlie's Angels (1976–1981)—a role he reprised in the 2000 and 2003 film adaptations; and as patriarch Blake Carrington in the prime time soap opera Dynasty (1981–1989). He hosted the series World of Survival (1971–1977), and was the host of the 38th Miss Universe Pageant, broadcast on CBS in 1989.

== Early life ==
Forsythe was born John (or Jacob) Lincoln Freund, on January 29, 1918, in Penns Grove, New Jersey, the eldest of three children of Blanche Forsythe (née Blohm) and Samuel Jeremiah Freund, a stockbroker. Blanche was born in Georgia to David Hyat Blohm (Yiddish: דוד הייאַט בלום; Russian: Дэвид Хаят Блом), a Russian Jewish immigrant, and Mary Materson (Yiddish: מרים מאטערסאָן), who was born in Maryland to Jewish emigrants from Prussia. Forysthe's father was born in New York to Polish Jewish immigrants. Forsythe was raised in the Jewish faith.

He was raised in Brooklyn, New York, where his father worked as a Wall Street businessman during the Great Depression of the 1930s. He graduated from Abraham Lincoln High School in Brooklyn at the age of 16, and began attending the University of North Carolina at Chapel Hill. In 1936, at the age of 18, he took a job as the public address announcer for Brooklyn Dodgers games at Ebbets Field, confirming a childhood love of baseball. He was a lifelong active Democrat.

== Movie career and Army service ==
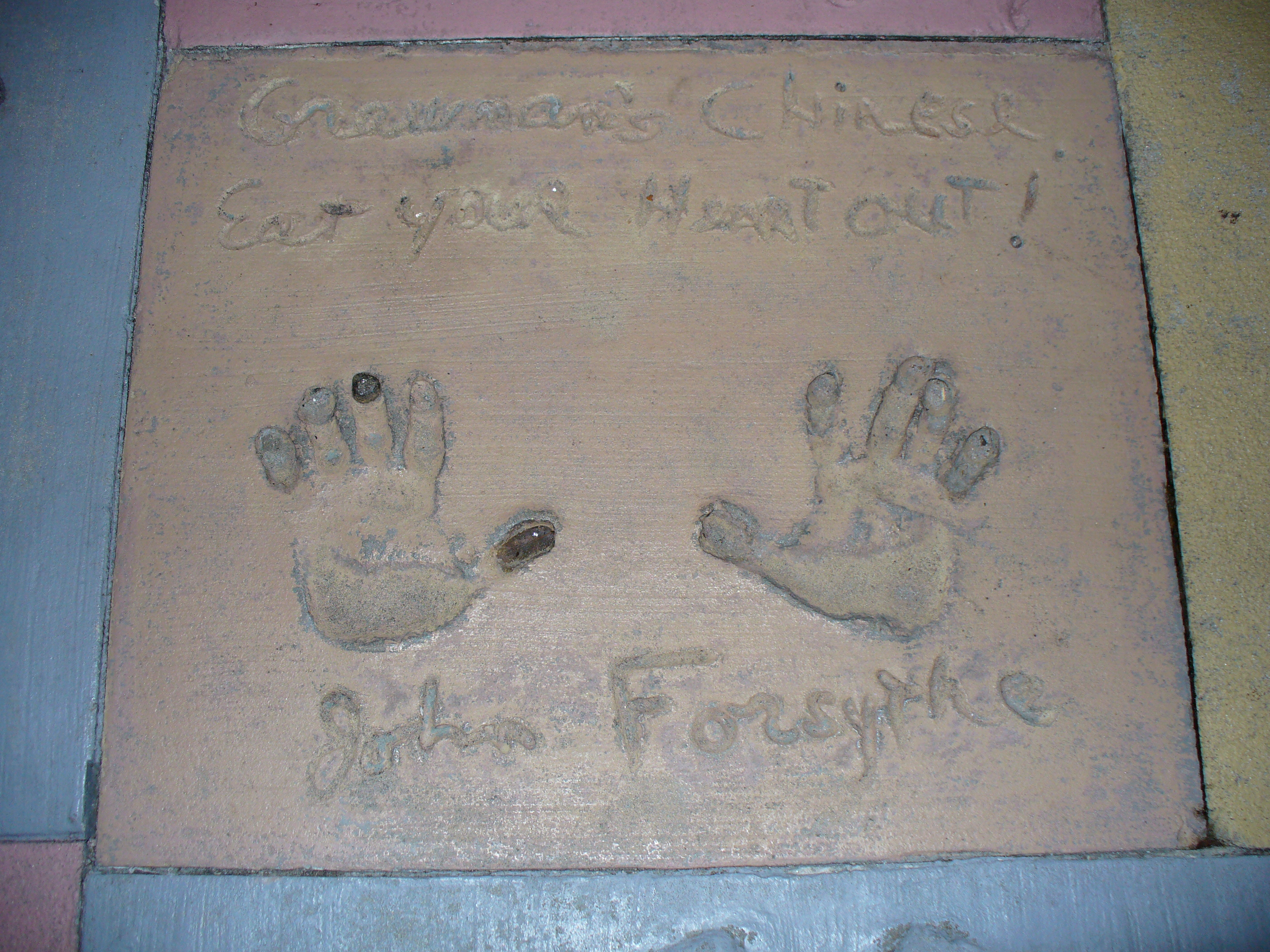
The handprints of John Forsythe in front of The Great Movie Ride at Walt Disney World's Disney's Hollywood Studios theme park.

Despite showing initial reluctance, Forsythe began an acting career at the suggestion of his father. As a bit player for Warner Brothers, Forsythe successfully appeared in several small parts.

As a result, he was given a small role in Destination Tokyo (1943). Leaving his movie career for service in the United States Army Air Forces in World War II, he appeared in the USAAF-produced play Winged Victory, then worked with injured soldiers who had developed speech problems.

In 1947, Forsythe joined the initial class of the Actors Studio, where he met Marlon Brando and Julie Harris, among others. During this time he appeared on Broadway in Mister Roberts and The Teahouse of the August Moon. In 1949, he had a non-regular but recurring role as Tom, a fellow homicide detective, on the radio crime drama program Broadway Is My Beat, which was originally broadcast from New York (before moving to Hollywood with a new cast later that year).

In 1955, Alfred Hitchcock cast him in the movie The Trouble with Harry, with Shirley MacLaine in her first movie appearance, for which she won a Golden Globe. In 1969, Forsythe appeared in another Hitchcock film, Topaz.

== Television work ==
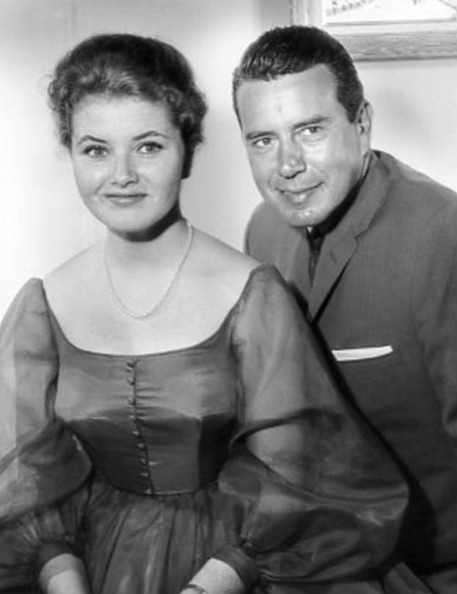
With Noreen Corcoran in Bachelor Father (1957–1962)

Throughout the 1950s, Forsythe successfully appeared in the new medium and worked regularly on all the networks, especially as a guest star. He appeared in the "Premonition" episode of the popular anthology Alfred Hitchcock Presents, opposite Cloris Leachman.

Forsythe was cast in a 1957 episode, "Decision at Wilson's Creek", on the CBS anthology series Dick Powell's Zane Grey Theatre. He played Confederate Lieutenant David Marr who suddenly resigns to return to his wife, only to find that he is scorned by townspeople.

=== Bachelor Father ===
In 1957, he took a leading role in the situation comedy Bachelor Father for CBS as Bentley Gregg, a playboy lawyer who has to become a father to his niece Kelly (played by Noreen Corcoran), upon the death of her parents. The show was an immediate ratings hit and moved to NBC the following season and to ABC in the fall of 1961. During the 1961–1962 season, Bachelor Father was cancelled because of declining ratings.

=== After Bachelor Father ===
During the 1960s, Forsythe returned to acting in movies including Kitten with a Whip (1964), Madame X (1966) and In Cold Blood (1967). In 1964 he starred in See How They Run which is notable for being the first film made for television.

He attempted two new television programs: The John Forsythe Show (originally titled The Mister and the Misses) on NBC with Guy Marks, Elsa Lanchester, Ann B. Davis, Peggy Lipton, and Forsythe's two young daughters, Page and Brooke (1965–1966), and To Rome with Love on CBS (1969–1971) with co-star Walter Brennan. Between 1971 and 1977, Forsythe served as narrator on the syndicated nature series, World of Survival (1971–1977). He was also the announcer for Michelob beer commercials during the 1970s and 1980s, notably during the "Weekends were made for Michelob" era.

=== Charlie's Angels ===
Forsythe began a 13-year association with Aaron Spelling in 1976, cast in the role of mysterious unseen millionaire private investigator Charles Townsend in the crime drama Charlie's Angels (1976–1981). The show starred Kate Jackson, Jaclyn Smith and Farrah Fawcett, making stars of all three but especially Fawcett. Forsythe introduces the series' concept during its opening credits:

Once upon a time, three little girls went to the police academy, where they were each assigned very hazardous duties. But I took them away from all that, and now they work for me. My name is Charlie.

Forsythe became the highest-paid actor on television on a per-hour basis: while the show's on-camera stars often worked 15-hour days five days a week, with a couple of hours just for hair and makeup, Forsythe's lines for an entire episode would be recorded in a sound studio in a matter of minutes, after which he would have lunch in the network's commissary and then leave for the track. During this period, Forsythe invested much money in Thoroughbred racing, a personal hobby. Gaining respect with the celebrity Thoroughbred circuit, he served on the board of directors at the Hollywood Park Racetrack starting in 1972, and was on the committee for more than 25 years.

Following heart problems, Forsythe underwent quadruple coronary artery bypass surgery in 1979. This was so successful that he not only returned to work on Charlie's Angels, he also appeared in the two-time Academy Award-nominated motion picture ...And Justice for All later that year as Judge Henry T. Fleming, the film's main antagonist, a corrupt judge who despises Al Pacino's lawyer character.

=== Dynasty ===
In 1981, nearing the end of Charlie's Angels, Forsythe was selected as a last-minute replacement for George Peppard in the role of the dedicated and resilient patriarch Blake Carrington in Dynasty. Another Spelling production, Dynasty was ABC's answer to the highly successful CBS series Dallas. Between 1985 and 1986, Forsythe also appeared as Blake Carrington in the short-lived spinoff series The Colbys.

The series reunited Forsythe with one-time Bachelor Father guest star Linda Evans, who would play Blake's wife, Krystle. During the run of the series, Forsythe, Evans and co-star Joan Collins, who played Blake's ex-wife Alexis, promoted the Dynasty line of fragrances. Dynasty came to an end in 1989, after nine seasons. Forsythe was the only actor to appear in all 220 episodes.

Forsythe was nominated for Emmy Awards three times between 1982 and 1984 for "Outstanding Lead Actor in a Drama Series" but did not win. He was also nominated six times for Golden Globe Awards, winning twice. He was nominated five times for the Soap Opera Digest Awards, also winning twice. In 1983, Forsythe was presented with the American Academy of Achievement's Golden Plate Award at a ceremony in Coronado, California.

=== The Powers That Be ===
In 1992, after a three-year absence, Forsythe returned to series television starring in Norman Lear's situation comedy The Powers That Be for NBC, co-starring Holland Taylor, Peter MacNicol, Valerie Mahaffey and David Hyde Pierce.

== Post-1990s work ==
Forsythe reprised his role as the voice of Charlie for the film version of Charlie's Angels (2000) and its sequel Charlie's Angels: Full Throttle (2003); he then retired from acting.

In 2005 actor Bartholomew John portrayed Forsythe in Dynasty: The Making of a Guilty Pleasure, a fictionalized television movie based on the creation and behind the scenes production of Dynasty.

On May 2, 2006, Forsythe appeared with Dynasty co-stars Linda Evans, Joan Collins, Pamela Sue Martin, Al Corley, Gordon Thomson and Catherine Oxenberg in Dynasty Reunion: Catfights & Caviar. The one-hour reunion special of the former ABC series aired on CBS.

== Thoroughbred racing ==
Forsythe owned and bred Thoroughbred racehorses for many years and was a member of the board of directors of Hollywood Park Racetrack. Among his successes, in partnership with film producer Martin Ritt he won the 1976 Longacres Mile with Yu Wipi.

With partner Ken Opstein, he won the 1982 Sixty Sails Handicap with Targa, and the 1993 La Brea Stakes with a daughter of Targa, Mamselle Bebette, which he raced under the name of his Big Train Farm, a stable he named for Hall of Fame baseball pitcher, Walter Johnson.

In the 1980s, Forsythe served as the regular host for the annual Eclipse Awards. He was the recipient of the 1988 Eclipse Award of Merit for his contribution in promoting the sport of Thoroughbred racing.

== Personal life ==
Forsythe married actress Parker Worthington McCormick (December 29, 1918 – July 22, 1980) in 1939. They had a son, Dall (born February 14, 1943), and divorced in 1943.

Also in 1943, Forsythe met Julie Warren (October 20, 1919 – August 15, 1994), initially a theatre companion, but later a successful actress in her own right, landing a role on Broadway in Around the World. She became Forsythe's second wife, and in the early 1950s they had two daughters.

Julie Warren died at age 74 from cancer in hospital after Forsythe made the decision to disconnect her life-support system. She had been in a coma following severe breathing difficulties.

In July 2002, Forsythe married businesswoman Nicole Carter (May 27, 1941 – May 11, 2010) at Ballard Country Church; they remained married until his death. Nicole Carter Forsythe died five weeks after her husband.

Besides spending time with his family, he enjoyed ownership of an art gallery.

Forsythe appeared each year to read to children during the annual Christmas program near his home at the rural resort community of Solvang, California.

Forsythe was treated for colorectal cancer in the fall of 2006. Surgery was reportedly successful and his cancer was considered to be in remission at the time of his death.

== Death ==
Forsythe died on April 1, 2010, from pneumonia in Santa Ynez, California, at the age of 92. He was interred at Oak Hill Cemetery, Ballard, Santa Barbara County, California.

== Legacy ==
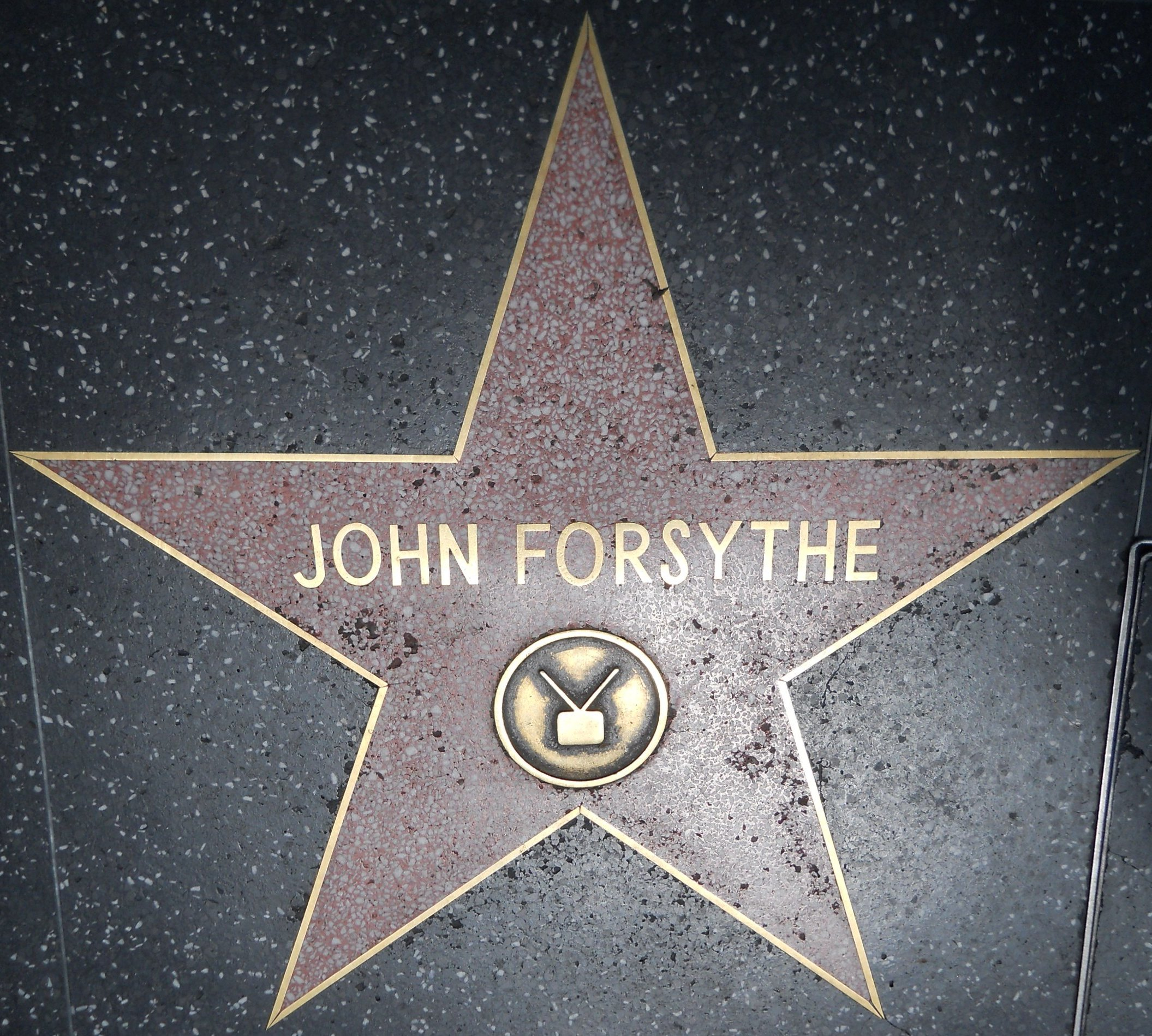
Hollywood Walk of Fame

Forsyth received a star on the Hollywood Walk of Fame in 1960.

== Filmography ==
=== Films ===
Year	Title	Role	Notes
1943	Northern Pursuit	Corporal	Uncredited
1943	Destination Tokyo	Sparks	
1949	Arson, Inc.	Race Track Announcer	Voice; uncredited
1951	American Harvest (16mm film)	Narrator	
1952	The Captive City	Jim Austin	
1953	It Happens Every Thursday	Bob MacAvoy	
1953	The Glass Web	Don Newell	
1953	Escape from Fort Bravo	Capt. John Marsh	
1955	The Trouble with Harry	Sam Marlowe	
1956	The Ambassador's Daughter	Sgt. Danny Sullivan	
1956	Everything but the Truth	Ernie Miller	
1959	Dubrowsky	Wladia	
1964	Kitten with a Whip	David	
1966	Madame X	Clay Anderson	
1967	In Cold Blood	Alvin Dewey	
1969	Marooned	Olympus / President	Uncredited
1969	Topaz	Michael Nordstrom	
1969	The Happy Ending	Fred Wilson	
1978	Goodbye & Amen	The American Ambassador	
1979	...And Justice for All.	Judge Henry T. Fleming	
1988	Scrooged	Lew Hayward	
1992	Stan and George's New Life	Father	
1999	We Wish You a Merry Christmas	Mr. Ryan	Voice; Direct to video
2000	Charlie's Angels	Charles "Charlie" Townsend	Voice
2003	Charlie's Angels: Full Throttle	Charles "Charlie" Townsend	Voice

=== Television ===
Year	Title	Role	Notes
1948	Stage Door	Keith Burgess	TV movie
1948	Kraft Television Theatre		2 episodes
1948	Actors Studio		Episode: "The Widow of Wasdale Head"
1949	NBC Presents		Episode: "Just for Tonight"
1949–1955	Studio One in Hollywood	Various	10 episodes
1951	The Ford Theatre Hour	Peter Flint	Episode: "The Golden Mouth"
1951	Robert Montgomery Presents	Dr. Frederick Steele	Episode: "Dark Victory"
1951	Starlight Theatre		2 episodes
1951	Cosmopolitan Theatre		Episode: "Time to Kill"
1951–1952	Lights Out	Various	3 episodes
1951–1952	Suspense	Various	5 episodes
1951–1952	Danger		2 episodes
1951–1958	Schlitz Playhouse of Stars	Various	5 episodes
1952	Pulitzer Prize Playhouse		2 episodes
1952	Curtain Call		Episode: "The Season of Divorce"
1952	The Philco Television Playhouse		2 episodes
1954	The United States Steel Hour	Prof. Gilbert Jardine	Episode: "King's Pawn"
1955	The Elgin Hour	George Conway	Episode: "Driftwood"
1955	Alfred Hitchcock Presents	Kim Stanger	Season 1 Episode 2: "Premonition"
1955–1958	Climax!	Various	5 episodes
1956	Playwrights '56	Joe Neville	Episode: "Return to Cassino"
1956	Star Stage		Episode: "A Place to be Alone"
1956	Goodyear Television Playhouse	Lt. John Stahlman	Episode: "Stardust II"
1957	Zane Grey Theatre	CSA Lt. David Marr	Episode: "Decision at Wilson Creek"
1957	General Electric Theater	Bentley Gregg	Episode: "New Girl in His Life"
1957–1962	Bachelor Father	Bentley Gregg	157 episodes
1958	The Major and the Minor		TV movie
1959	Lux Playhouse	Colonel Bill Adams	Episode: "The Miss and Missiles"
1959	Sunday Showcase	Al Manheim	2 episodes
1962	The Alfred Hitchcock Hour	Michael Barnes	'Episode: "I Saw The Whole Thing"
1963	Alcoa Premiere	Andy Ballard	Episode: "Five, Six, Pick Up Sticks"
1963	The Dick Powell Show	Peter Kent	Episode: "The Third Side of a Coin"
1963	Kraft Mystery Theater		Episode: "Go Look at the Roses"
1964	See How They Run	Martin Young	TV movie
1964	Kraft Suspense Theatre		2 episodes
1965	Theatre of Stars	Charlie King	Episode: "In Any Language"
1965–1966	The John Forsythe Show	Major John Foster	29 episodes
1966	Insight	Ray	2 episodes
1967	Run for Your Life	Spencer Holt	Episode: "A Choice of Evils"
1967	The Red Skelton Show	Millionaire's Son	Episode: "A New York Stripper Is Not Always a Steak"
A Bell for Adano	Maj. Victor Joppola	TV movie	
1968	Shadow on the Land	TV movie	Gen. Wendell Bruce
1969–1971	To Rome with Love	Michael Endicott	48 episodes
1971	Murder Once Removed	Dr. Ron Wellesley	TV movie
1973	The Letters	Paul Anderson	Unsold pilot
1973	Lisa, Bright and Dark	William Schilling	TV movie
1974	Cry Panic	David Ryder	TV movie
1974	Police Story	Sam McCullough	Episode: "Chief"
1974	The Healers	Dr. Robert Kier	TV movie
1974	Terror on the 40th Floor	Daniel 'Dan' Overland	TV movie
1975	The Deadly Tower	Lt. Elwood Forbes	TV movie
1975	Medical Story	Amos Winkler	Episode: "Million Dollar Baby"
1976	Amelia Earhart	G.P. Putnam	Miniseries
1976–1981	Charlie's Angels	Charles "Charlie" Townsend (voice)	109 episodes; uncredited
1977	Tail Gunner Joe	Paul Cunningham	TV movie
1977	Emily, Emily	Niles Putnam	TV movie
1977	The Feather and Father Gang	E.J. Valerian	Episode: "Never Con a Killer" (Pilot)
1978	Cruise Into Terror	Reverend Charles Mather	TV movie
1978	With This Ring	General Albert Harris	TV movie
1978	The Users	Reade Jamieson	TV movie
1980	A Time for Miracles	Postulator	TV movie
1981	Sizzle	Mike Callahan	TV movie
1981–1989	Dynasty	Blake Carrington	Main role Golden Globe Award for Best Actor - Television Series Drama; Soap Opera Digest Award - Outstanding Actor in a Mature Role in a Prime Time Soap Opera; Outstanding Actor in a Prime Time Soap Opera> Nominated - Golden Globe Award for Best Actor - Television Series Drama; Nominated — Primetime Emmy Award for Outstanding Lead Actor in a Drama Series (1982–1984); Nominated — Soap Opera Digest Award: Favorite Super Couple on a Prime Time Serial (with Linda Evans); Outstanding Actor in a Leading Role on a Prime Time Serial; Nominated — Soap Opera Digest Award: Favorite Super Couple: Prime Time (with Linda Evans)
1982	Mysterious Two	He	TV movie
1983	The Love Boat	Burt Gardner	2 episodes
1985–1986	The Colbys	Blake Carrington	4 episodes
1987	On Fire	Joe Leary Sr.	TV movie
1989	Champions in Kentucky: The Story of the 1988 Breeders' Cup	Narrator	TV movie
1990	Opposites Attract	Rex Roper	TV movie
1991	Spirit of a Champion: The Story of the 1990 Breeders' Cup	Narrator	TV movie
1991	Dynasty: The Reunion	Blake Carrington	Miniseries
1992–1993	The Powers That Be	Sen. William Franklin Powers	21 episodes
1993–1994	I Witness Video	Host	
1996	Adventures from the Book of Virtues	Dadelaus (voice)	Episode: "Responsibility"
1996	The Goliath Chronicles	Pat Doyle (voice)	Episode: "Ransom"
2006	Dynasty Reunion: Catfights & Caviar	Himself / Blake Carrington	Documentary

=== Web ===
Year	Title	Role	Notes
2003	Charlie's Angels: Animated Adventures	Charles "Charlie" Townsend (voice)	Episode: "Chapter One: Most Delicious Angels"; uncredited

== Radio appearances ==
Year	Program	Episode/source
1949	Broadway Is My Beat	semi-recurring role as Tom
1953	Best Plays	The Farmer Takes a Wife
