= Watch the Birdie! =

- Original language: English
- Written by: Norman Krasna
- Genre: sex comedy

Premiere
- Date: 1964

Watch the Birdie! is a 1964 comedy play by Norman Krasna.

== Plot ==
A crack legal secretary working for an attorney specializing in divorce cases, Helen is happy in her job until a personable young man appears and offers her the chance to go to Paris as his assistant.

== Background ==
In October 1962 Seven Arts announced they had bought the stage rights and would co produce the play with Fred Coe. In April 1964 Ray Stark of Seven Arts announced he hoped to produce the play next.

In 1964 June it was announced Joan Blondell, Peggy Ann Garner and Alan Alda would appear in a production in Florida.
