= Katharine Hepburn on screen and stage =

Katharine Hepburn (May 12, 1907 – June 29, 2003) was an American actress of the 20th century, active in 44 feature films, 8 telemovies, and 33 stage plays over 66 years from 1928 and 1994.

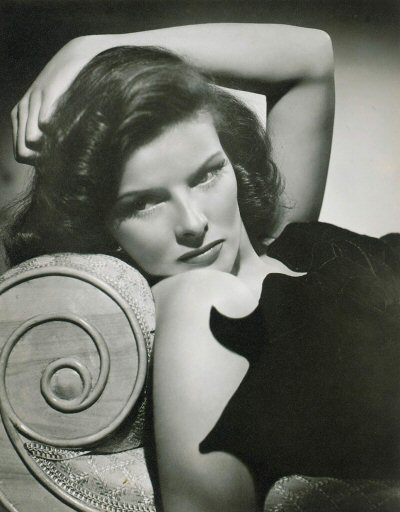
Katharine Hepburn in 1938

Film	44
Telemovies	8
Theatre	33
TV documentaries	2
Narration	2 shorts

Hepburn began her career in theatre in 1928, and later appeared on the stage in every decade up until the 1980s. Productions Hepburn played in ranged from Shakespeare, to Philip Barry comedies, work by George Bernard Shaw, and a musical.

Hepburn made her film debut in A Bill of Divorcement in 1932. Over the next six decades, she appeared in a range of genres, including screwball comedies, period dramas, and adaptations of works by notable playwrights like Tennessee Williams, Eugene O'Neill, and Edward Albee.

Her final appearance in a theatrically released film was a supporting role in Love Affair in 1994. Hepburn first appeared in a television film in 1973, and later continued to appear in the medium until she gave the final performance of her career in One Christmas in 1994. Hepburn also presented two documentaries for television, and narrated two short documentaries.

== Screen ==
=== Feature films ===
Year	Title	Role	Director	Notes
1932	A Bill of Divorcement	Sidney Fairfield	George Cukor	
1933	Christopher Strong	Lady Cynthia Darrington	Dorothy Arzner	
1933	Morning Glory	Eva Lovelace	Lowell Sherman	Academy Award for Best Actress
1933	Little Women	Josephine "Jo" March	George Cukor	
1934	Spitfire	Trigger Hicks	John Cromwell	
1934	The Little Minister	Babbie	Richard Wallace	
1935	Break of Hearts	Constance Dane	Philip Moeller	
1935	Alice Adams	Alice Adams	George Stevens	Nomination—Academy Award for Best Actress
1935	Sylvia Scarlett	Sylvia Scarlett	George Cukor	
1936	Mary of Scotland	Mary Stuart	John Ford	
1936	A Woman Rebels	Pamela Thislewaite	Mark Sandrich	
1937	Quality Street	Phoebe Throssel	George Stevens	
1937	Stage Door	Terry Randall	Gregory La Cava	
1938	Bringing Up Baby	Susan Vance	Howard Hawks	
1938	Holiday	Linda Seton	George Cukor	
1940	The Philadelphia Story	Tracy Lord	George Cukor	Nomination—Academy Award for Best Actress; New York Film Critics Circle Award for Best Actress
1942	Woman of the Year	Tess Harding	George Stevens	Nomination—Academy Award for Best Actress
1943	Keeper of the Flame	Christine Forrest	George Cukor	
1943	Stage Door Canteen	Katharine Hepburn	Frank Borzage	
1944	Dragon Seed	Jade	Jack Conway	
1945	Without Love	Jamie Rowan	Harold S. Bucquet	
1946	Undercurrent	Ann Hamilton	Vincente Minnelli	
1947	The Sea of Grass	Lutie Cameron	Elia Kazan	
1947	Song of Love	Clara Wieck Schumann	Clarence Brown	
1948	State of the Union	Mary Matthews	Frank Capra	
1949	Adam's Rib	Amanda Bonner	George Cukor	
1951	The African Queen	Rose Sayer	John Huston	Nomination—Academy Award for Best Actress
1952	Pat and Mike	Patricia "Pat" Pemberton	George Cukor	
1955	Summertime	Jane Hudson	David Lean	Nomination—Academy Award for Best Actress
1956	The Rainmaker	Lizzie Curry	Joseph Anthony	Nomination—Academy Award for Best Actress
1956	The Iron Petticoat	Vinka Kovelenko	Ralph Thomas	
1957	Desk Set	Bunny Watson	Walter Lang	
1959	Suddenly, Last Summer	Violet Venable	Joseph L. Mankiewicz	Nomination—Academy Award for Best Actress
1962	Long Day's Journey into Night	Mary Tyrone	Sidney Lumet	Nomination—Academy Award for Best Actress; Cannes Film Festival Award for Best Actress
1967	Guess Who's Coming to Dinner	Christina Drayton	Stanley Kramer	Academy Award for Best Actress
1968	The Lion in Winter	Eleanor of Aquitaine	Anthony Harvey	Academy Award for Best Actress (tied with Barbra Streisand)
1969	The Madwoman of Chaillot	Aurelia, The Madwoman of Chaillot	Bryan Forbes	
1971	The Trojan Women	Hecuba	Michael Cacoyannis	
1973	A Delicate Balance	Agnes	Tony Richardson	
1975	Rooster Cogburn	Eula Goodnight	Stuart Millar	
1978	Olly Olly Oxen Free	Miss Pudd	Richard A. Colla	
1981	On Golden Pond	Ethel Thayer	Mark Rydell	Academy Award for Best Actress
1985	Grace Quigley	Grace Quigley	Anthony Harvey	
1994	Love Affair	Ginny	Glenn Gordon Caron	

=== Television films ===
Year	Title	Role	Director
1973	The Glass Menagerie	Amanda Wingfield	Anthony Harvey
1975	Love Among the Ruins	Jessica Medlicott	George Cukor
1979	The Corn Is Green	Lily Moffat	George Cukor
1986	Mrs. Delafield Wants to Marry	Margaret Delafield	George Schaefer
1988	Laura Lansing Slept Here	Laura Lansing	George Schaefer
1992	The Man Upstairs	Victoria Brown	George Schaefer
1994	This Can't Be Love	Marion Bennett	Anthony Harvey
1994	One Christmas	Cornelia Beaumont	Tony Bill

=== Short subjects ===
Year	Title	Role	Notes	Director
1941	Women in Defense	Narrator	Documentary	John Ford
1946	American Creed	Narrator	Documentary	Robert Stevenson

=== Box Office Ranking ===
- 1934 – 11th
- 1935 – 23rd
- 1968 – 18th
- 1969 – 9th
- 1970 – 20th
- 1982 – 12th

== Theatre ==
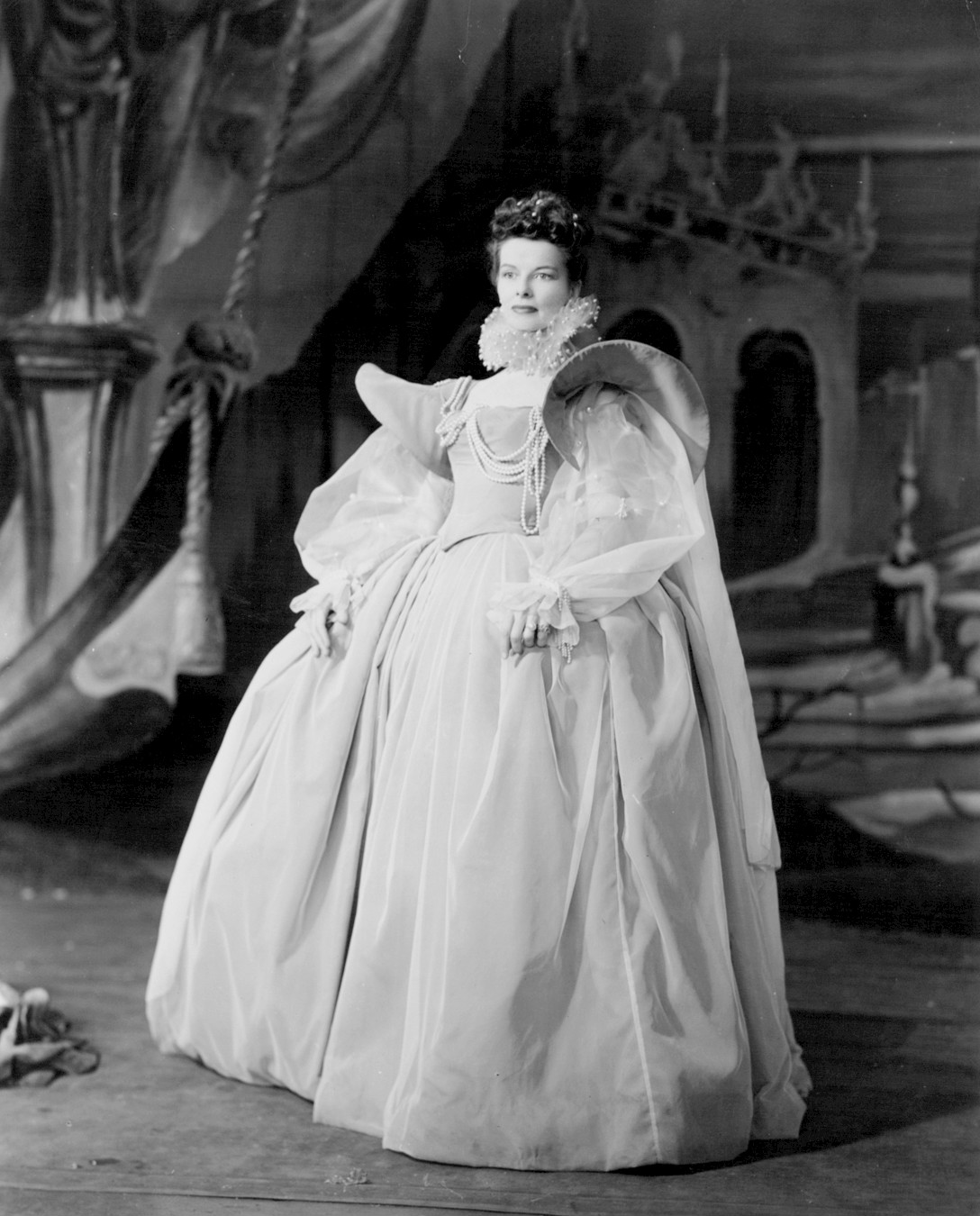
Hepburn as Rosalind in the Theatre Guild production of As You Like It (1950)

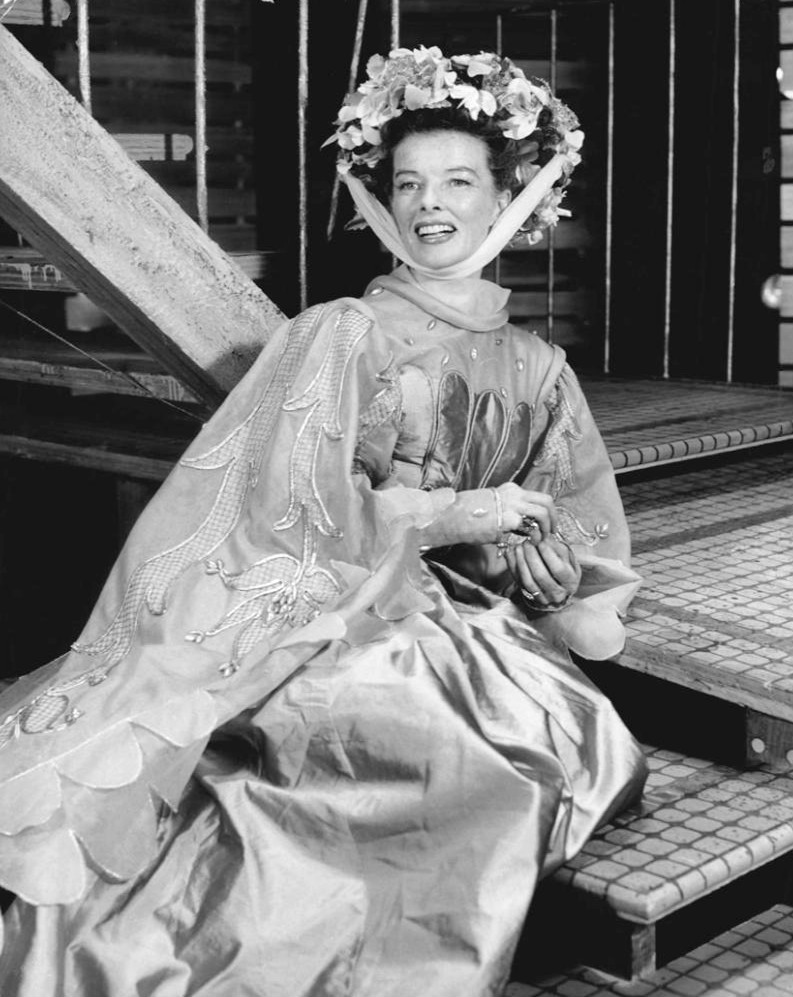
Hepburn as Beatrice in Much Ado About Nothing, on tour with the American Shakespeare Theatre (1958)

Year	Play	Role	Theatre	Notes
1928	The Czarina	A Lady-in-Waiting	Baltimore, Maryland	
1928	The Cradle Snatchers	A flapper	Baltimore	
1928	The Big Pond	Barbara	New York City, New York	Released after one performance
1928	These Days	Veronica Sims	Cort Theatre, New York City	
1928	Holiday	Linda Seton	Plymouth Theatre, New York City	Understudy
1930	A Month in the Country	Grazia	Guild Theatre, New York City	Understudy
1930	A Romantic Young Lady	Katia; Viera Alexandrovna	The Berkshire Playhouse, Stockbridge	
1930	The Admirable Crichton		The Berkshire Playhouse, Stockbridge	
1930	Art and Mrs. Bottle	Judy Bottle	Maxine Elliott Theatre, New York City	
1931	Just Married		Ivoryton	
1931	It's a Wise Child		Ivoryton	
1931	Alias the Deacon		Ivoryton	
1931	The Cat and the Canary		Ivoryton	
1931	Let Us Be Gay		Ivoryton	
1931	The Man Who Came Back		Ivoryton	
1932	The Warrior's Husband	Antiope	Morosco Theatre, New York City	March–May 1932
1932	The Bride the Sun Shines On		Ossining, New York	
1934	The Lake	Stella Surrege	Martin Beck Theatre, New York City	
1936–1937	Jane Eyre	Jane Eyre	On tour	
1939–1941	The Philadelphia Story	Tracy Lord	Schubert Theatre, New York City	Played New York March 1939 – March 1940; Toured Washington, D.C., and Chicago October 1940 – 1941; Revival in Washington in 1942
1942–1943	Without Love	Jamie Coe Rowan	St. James Theatre, New York City	Toured first; New York, October 1942 – February 1943
1950	As You Like It	Rosalind	Cort Theatre, New York City	Toured after New York
1952	The Millionairess	Epifania	New Theatre, London, UK; Schubert Theatre, New York City	Played Newcastle-upon-Tyne and Manchester before London; New York dates: 17 October – 28 December 1952
1955	The Taming of the Shrew	Katherina	Australia tour	May - November 1955
1955	Measure for Measure	Isabella	Australia tour	May - November 1955
1955	The Merchant of Venice	Portia	Australia tour	May - November 1955
1957	The Merchant of Venice	Portia	American Shakespeare Theatre, Stratford	
1957	Much Ado About Nothing	Beatrice	American Shakespeare Theatre, Stratford	
1960	Twelfth Night	Viola	American Shakespeare Theatre, Stratford	
1960	Antony and Cleopatra	Cleopatra	American Shakespeare Theatre, Stratford	
1969–1971	Coco	Coco Chanel	Mark Hellinger Theatre, New York City	Played New York 18 December 1969 – 3 August 1970; Toured in 1971
1976–1977	A Matter of Gravity	Mrs. Basil	Broadhurst Theatre, New York City	Began with a 12-week pre-Broadway tour; After New York, toured U.S. for 6 months
1981–1982	The West Side Waltz	Margaret Mary Elderdice	On tour	Toured U.S. before ending at Ethel Barrymore Theatre on Broadway

== See also ==
- List of awards and nominations received by Katharine Hepburn
