= List of awards and nominations received by Katharine Hepburn =

Katharine Hepburn awards and nominations
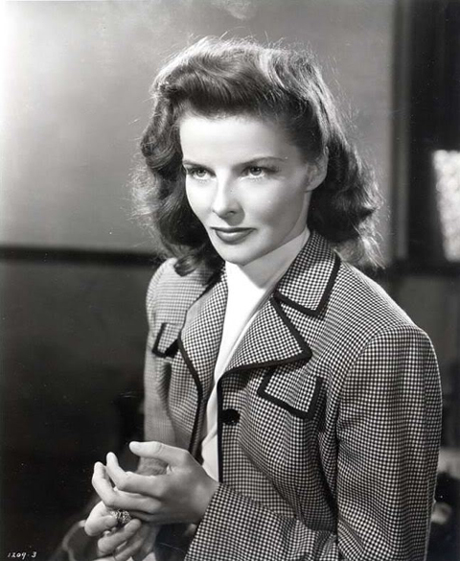
- Hepburn in 1942
Awards and nominations
Award	Wins	Nominations
Academy Awards	4	12
British Academy Film Awards	2	5
Golden Globe Awards	0	8
Grammy Awards	0	2
Primetime Emmy Awards	1	6
Tony Awards	0	2
Actor Awards	0	1

Totals (Note: Certain award groups do not simply award one winner. They acknowledge several different recipients, have runners-up, and have third place. Since this is a specific recognition and is different from losing an award, runner-up mentions are considered wins in this award tally. For simplification and to avoid errors, each award in this list has been presumed to have had a prior nomination.)
- Wins: 50
- Nominations: 100

Katharine Hepburn (1907–2003) was an American actress. Her career on stage and screen spanned 67 years through eight decades (1928–1995), during which she was honored with many of the industry's top awards. Hepburn was nominated for a total of 12 Academy Awards for Best Actress, and won four – the record number of wins for a performer. She received two British Academy Film Awards, one Primetime Emmy Award, and an Actor Award, in addition to nominations for two Tony Awards, two Grammy Awards, and eight Golden Globes.

International awards from the Cannes Film Festival, Venice Film Festival, the New York Film Critics Circle Awards, the People's Choice Awards, and others. Hepburn was inducted into the American Theater Hall of Fame in 1979. She also won a Lifetime Achievement Award from the Screen Actors Guild in 1979, and received the Kennedy Center Honors, which recognize a lifetime of accomplishments in the arts, in 1990.

She also won awards from the Cannes Film Festival, Venice Film Festival, and Montréal World Film Festival; the New York Film Critics Circle Awards and the Kansas City Film Critics Circle Awards; the People's Choice Awards, the Laurel Awards, the Golden Apple Awards, the American Movie Awards, the American Comedy Awards, and the David di Donatello Awards. Hepburn was inducted into the American Theater Hall of Fame in 1979. She also received the Screen Actors Guild Life Achievement Award in 1979, and the Kennedy Center Honors in 1990.

Outside of acting, Hepburn also received recognition from the American Humanist Association and the Council of Fashion Designers of America. In 2000, at age 93, she was named by the American Film Institute as the greatest female star of Classic Hollywood cinema.

== Academy Awards ==
Hepburn's four Academy Awards for Best Actress, which are on display in the Smithsonian American Art Museum

Hepburn won four Academy Awards, the record number for a performer, and received a total of 12 Oscar nominations for Best Actress — a number surpassed only by Meryl Streep. Hepburn also holds the record for the longest time span between first and last Oscar nominations, at 48 years. She won for Best Actress for her roles as an actress on her journey to stardom in Morning Glory (1933), a mother who's shocked when her daughter is engaged to a black man in Guess Who's Coming to Dinner (1967), Eleanor of Aquitaine in The Lion in Winter (1968), and an elderly woman in On Golden Pond (1981). She was Oscar-nominated for Alice Adams (1935), The Philadelphia Story (1940), Woman of the Year (1942), The African Queen (1951), Summertime (1955), The Rainmaker (1956), Suddenly, Last Summer (1959), and Long Day's Journey into Night (1962).

== Major associations ==
=== Academy Awards ===
Year	Category	Nominated work	Result	Ref.
1932/33	Best Actress	Morning Glory	Won	
1935	Best Actress	Alice Adams	Nominated	
1940	Best Actress	The Philadelphia Story	Nominated	
1942	Best Actress	Woman of the Year	Nominated	
1951	Best Actress	The African Queen	Nominated	
1955	Best Actress	Summertime	Nominated	
1956	Best Actress	The Rainmaker	Nominated	
1959	Best Actress	Suddenly, Last Summer	Nominated	
1962	Best Actress	Long Day's Journey into Night	Nominated	
1967	Best Actress	Guess Who's Coming to Dinner	Won	
1968	Best Actress	The Lion in Winter (Note: Tied with Barbra Streisand (Funny Girl); one of two women (along with Luise Rainer) to win the Best Actress Oscar in consecutive years.)	Won	
1981	Best Actress	On Golden Pond	Won	

=== BAFTA Awards ===
Year	Category	Nominated work	Result	Ref.
British Academy Film Awards
1953	Best Foreign Actress	The African Queen	Nominated	
1956	Best Foreign Actress	Summertime	Nominated	
1958	Best Foreign Actress	The Rainmaker	Nominated	
1969	Best Actress in a Leading Role	Guess Who's Coming to Dinner / The Lion in Winter	Won	
1983	Best Actress in a Leading Role	On Golden Pond	Won	

=== Emmy Awards ===
Year	Category	Nominated work	Result	Ref.
Primetime Emmy Awards
1974	Best Lead Actress in a Drama	The Glass Menagerie	Nominated	
1975	Outstanding Lead Actress in a Special Program – Drama or Comedy	Love Among the Ruins	Won	
1979	Outstanding Lead Actress in a Limited Series or Special	The Corn is Green	Nominated	
1986	Outstanding Lead Actress in a Miniseries or Special	Mrs. Delafield Wants to Marry	Nominated	
1986	Outstanding Informational Special	The Spencer Tracy Legacy: A Tribute by Katharine Hepburn	Nominated	
1993	Outstanding Informational Special	Katharine Hepburn: All About Me	Nominated	

=== Golden Globe Awards ===
Year	Category	Nominated work	Result	Ref.
1952	Best Actress in a Motion Picture – Comedy or Musical	Pat and Mike	Nominated	
1956	Best Actress in a Motion Picture – Drama	The Rainmaker	Nominated	
1959	Best Actress in a Motion Picture – Drama	Suddenly, Last Summer	Nominated	
1962	Best Actress in a Motion Picture – Drama	Long Day's Journey into Night	Nominated	
1967	Best Actress in a Motion Picture – Drama	Guess Who's Coming to Dinner	Nominated	
1968	Best Actress in a Motion Picture – Drama	The Lion in Winter	Nominated	
1981	Best Actress in a Motion Picture – Drama	On Golden Pond	Nominated	
1992	Best Actress - Miniseries or Television Film	The Man Upstairs	Nominated	

=== Grammy Awards ===
Year	Category	Nominated work	Result	Ref.
1988	Best Spoken Word or Non-Musical Recording	Lincoln Portrait	Nominated	
1992	Best Spoken Word or Non-Musical Album	Me: Stories of My Life	Nominated	

=== Actor Awards ===
Year	Category	Nominated work	Result	Ref.
1979	Lifetime Achievement Award	—N/a	Honored	
1994	Outstanding Performance by a Female Actor in a Miniseries or Television Movie	One Christmas	Nominated	

=== Tony Awards ===
Year	Category	Nominated work	Result	Ref.
1970	Best Actress in a Musical	Coco	Nominated	
1982	Best Actress in a Play	The West Side Waltz	Nominated	

== Festival awards ==
Organizations	Year	Category	Work	Result	Ref.
Venice Film Festival	1934	Volpi Cup for Best Actress	Little Women	Won	
Cannes Film Festival	1962	Best Actress	Long Day's Journey into Night	Won	
Montréal World Film Festival	1984	Special Prize of the Jury	Grace Quigley	Won	

== Critics awards ==
Organizations	Year	Category	Work	Result	Ref.
New York Film Critics Circle	1940	Best Actress	The Philadelphia Story	Won	
Mexican Cinema Journalists	1965	Best Foreign Actress	Long Day's Journey Into Night	Won	
Kansas City Film Critics Circle	1973	Best Actress	The Trojan Women	Won	

== Miscellaneous awards ==
Organizations	Year	Category	Work	Result	Ref.
American Movie Award	1982	Best Actress	On Golden Pond	Won	
David di Donatello Award	1968	Best Foreign Actress	Guess Who's Coming to Dinner	Won	
People's Choice Awards	1976	Favorite Motion Picture Actress	—N/a	Won	
People's Choice Awards	1983	Favorite Motion Picture Actress	—N/a	Won	
Laurel Awards	1960	Top Female Dramatic Performance	Suddenly, Last Summer	Nominated	
Laurel Awards	1963	Top Female Dramatic Performance	Long Day's Journey into Night	Nominated	
Laurel Awards	1970	Top Female Dramatic Performance	The Lion in Winter	Won	
Laurel Awards	1970	Top Female Star	—N/a	Won	
Laurel Awards	1971	Top Female Star	—N/a	Won	
Golden Apple Awards	1975	Female Star of the Year	—N/a	Won	
Golden Apple Awards	1982	Female Star of the Year	—N/a	Won	

== Honorary awards ==
Organizations	Year	Award	Result	Ref.
Harvard University	1958	Hasty Pudding Woman of the Year	Honored	
Hollywood Walk of Fame	1960	Motion Picture Star	Honored	
American Theater Hall of Fame	1979	Induction	Honored	
Actor Awards	1979	Screen Actors Guild Life Achievement Award	Honored	
American Humanist Association	1985	Humanist Arts Award	Honored	
Council of Fashion Designers of America	1985	Lifetime Achievement Award	Honored	
American Comedy Awards	1989	Lifetime Achievement Award in Comedy	Honored	
John F. Kennedy Center for the Performing Arts	1990	Kennedy Center Honors	Honored	

== See also ==
- Katharine Hepburn on screen and stage
