= Katharine Hepburn =

American actress (1907–2003)

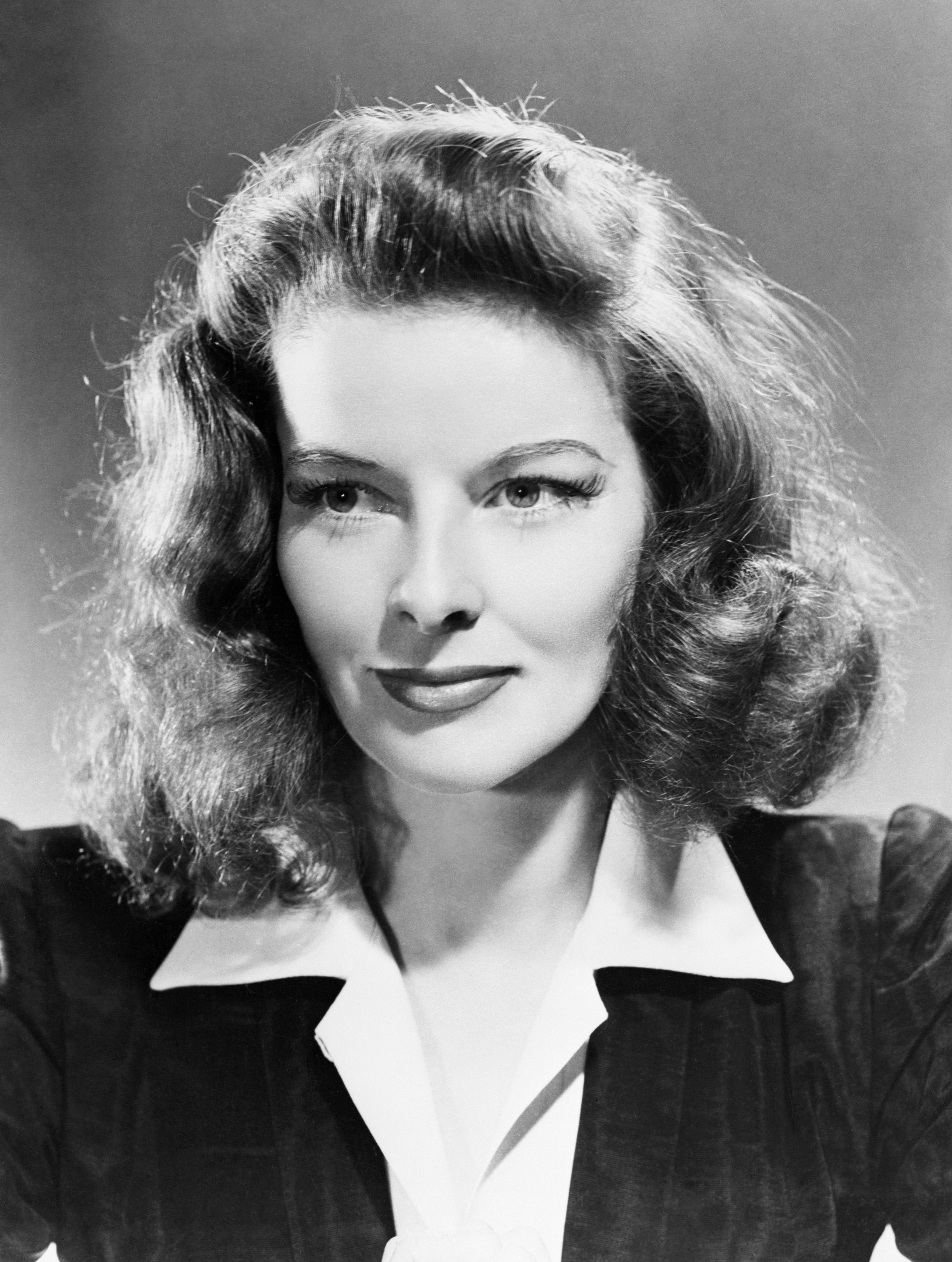
- MGM studio publicity portrait, c. 1941
- Born: Katharine Houghton Hepburn; May 12, 1907; Hartford, Connecticut, U.S.
- Died: June 29, 2003 (aged 96); Old Saybrook, Connecticut, U.S.
- Burial place: Cedar Hill Cemetery
- Education: Bryn Mawr College (BA)
- Occupation: Actress
- Years active: 1928–1995
- Works: Full list
- Political party: Democratic
- Spouse: Ludlow Ogden Smith (m. 1928; div. 1934)
- Mother: Katharine Martha Houghton Hepburn
- Relatives: Houghton family
- Awards: Full list
- Katharine Hepburn's voice Sample, from Stage Door (1937)

Katharine Houghton Hepburn (May 12, 1907 – June 29, 2003) was an American actress whose career as a leading lady on stage and screen spanned six decades. Known for her headstrong independence, spirited personality, and outspokenness, she cultivated a screen persona that matched this public image, and regularly played strong-willed, sophisticated women. She worked in a varied range of genres, from screwball comedy to literary drama. Her accolades include a record four Academy Awards for Best Actress, two British Academy Film Awards and a Primetime Emmy Award, in addition to nominations for two Tony Awards, two Grammy Awards and eight Golden Globe Awards.

Raised in Connecticut by progressive parents, Hepburn began to act while at Bryn Mawr College. Favorable reviews of her work on Broadway brought her to the attention of Hollywood. Her early years in film brought her international fame, including an Academy Award for Best Actress for her third film, Morning Glory (1933), but this was followed by a series of commercial failures culminating in the critically lauded box office failure Bringing Up Baby (1938).

Hepburn made a comeback by buying out her contract with RKO Radio Pictures and acquiring the film rights to The Philadelphia Story, which she sold on the condition that she be the star. That comedy film was a box office success and landed her a third Academy Award nomination. In the 1940s, she was contracted to Metro-Goldwyn-Mayer, where her career focused on an alliance with Spencer Tracy. The screen partnership spanned 26 years and produced nine films.

In the latter half of her life, Hepburn acted in Shakespearean stage productions and a range of literary roles. She found a niche playing mature, independent, and sometimes unmarried or widowed women such as in The African Queen (1951), a persona the public embraced. Hepburn received three more Academy Awards for her performances in Guess Who's Coming to Dinner (1967), The Lion in Winter (1968), and On Golden Pond (1981). In the 1970s, she began appearing in television films, which later became her focus. She made her final screen appearance at the age of 87. After a period of inactivity and ill health, Hepburn died in 2003 at the age of 96.

Hepburn is famous for having shunned the Hollywood publicity machine, and for refusing to conform to societal expectations of women. She had a reputation for being outspoken, assertive, and athletic, and wore pants before it was fashionable. She married once, as a young woman, but thereafter lived independently. With her unconventional lifestyle and the independent characters she brought to the screen, Hepburn came to epitomize the "modern woman" in 20th-century America and influenced changing popular perceptions of women. In 1999, she was named the greatest female star of classic Hollywood cinema by the American Film Institute.

== Early life and education ==
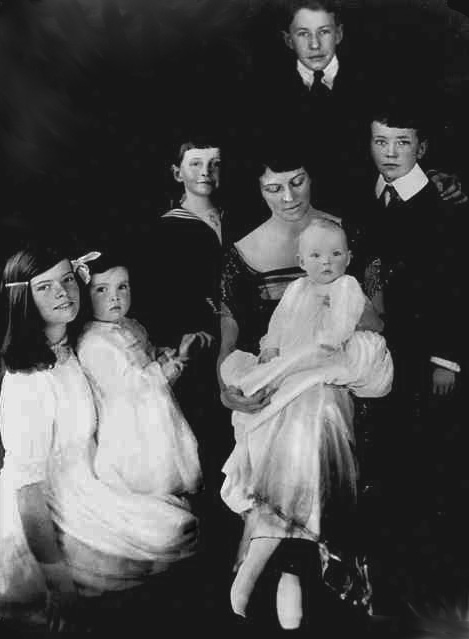
Left to right: daughter Katharine, Marion, Robert, Thomas, and Richard. Her mother is seated at center with daughter Margaret, 1921

Katharine Houghton Hepburn was born on May 12, 1907, in Hartford, Connecticut, the second of six children. Her parents were Thomas Norval Hepburn (1879–1962), a urologist at Hartford Hospital, and Katharine Martha Houghton Hepburn (1878–1951), a feminist campaigner. Both parents fought for social change in the United States: Thomas Hepburn helped establish the New England Social Hygiene Association, which educated the public about venereal disease, while the elder Katharine headed the Connecticut Woman Suffrage Association and later campaigned for birth control with Margaret Sanger. As a child, Hepburn joined her mother on several "Votes For Women" demonstrations. The Hepburn children were raised to exercise freedom of speech and encouraged to think and debate on any topic they wished. Her parents were criticized by the community for their progressive views, which stimulated Hepburn to fight against barriers she encountered. Hepburn said she realized from a young age that she was the product of "two very remarkable parents", and credited her "enormously lucky" upbringing with providing the foundation for her success. She remained close with her family throughout her life.

The young Hepburn was a tomboy who liked to call herself Jimmy and cut her hair short. Thomas Hepburn was eager for his children to use their minds and bodies to the limit and taught them to swim, run, dive, ride, wrestle, and play golf and tennis. Golf became a passion of Hepburn's; she took daily lessons and became very adept, reaching the semi-final of the Connecticut Young Women's Golf Championship. She loved swimming in Long Island Sound, and took ice-cold baths every morning in the belief that "the bitterer the medicine, the better it was for you". Hepburn was a fan of films from a young age and went to see one every Saturday night. She would put on plays and perform for her neighbors with friends and siblings for 50 cents a ticket to raise money for the Navajo people.

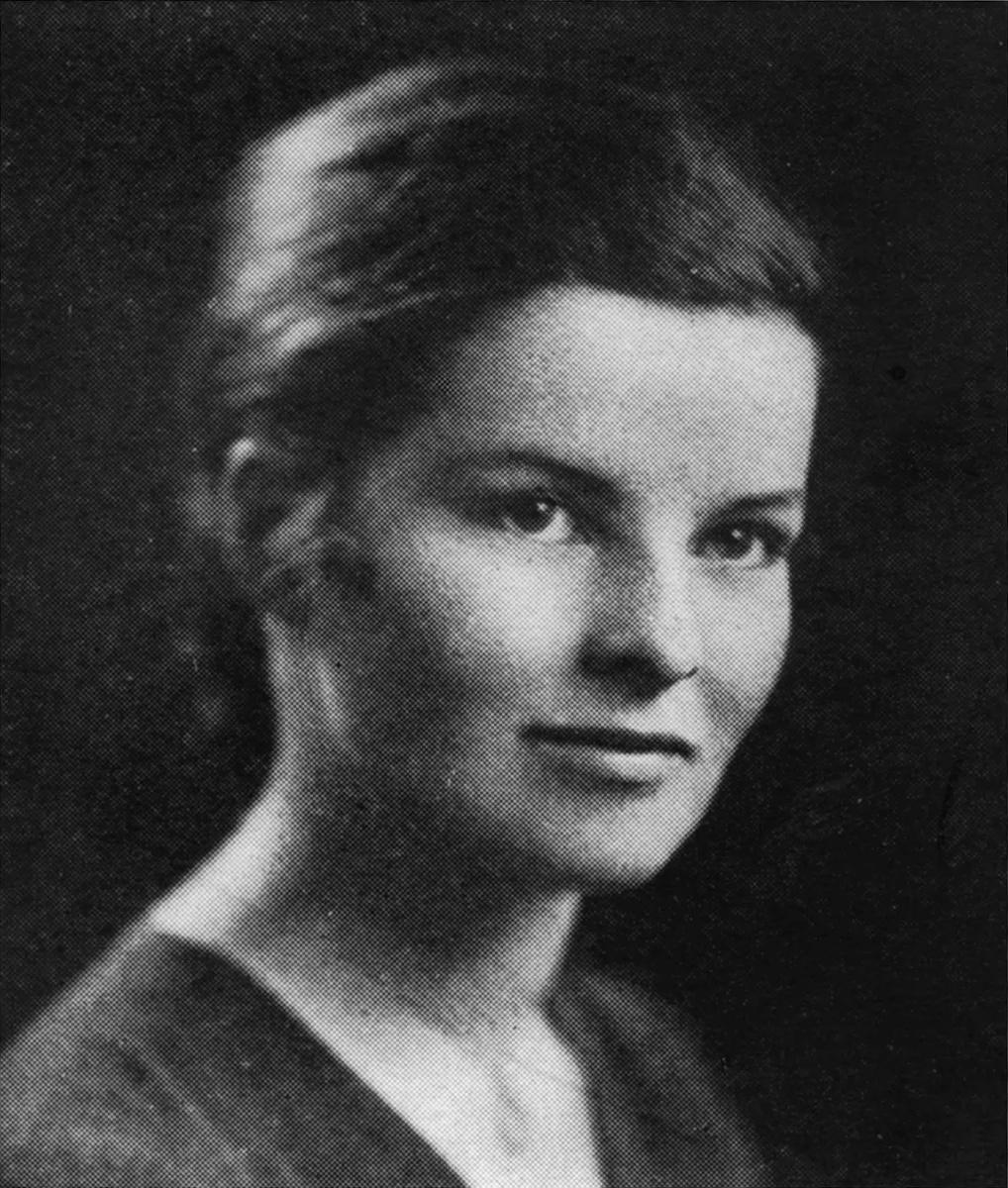
Hepburn's yearbook photo, 1928, Bryn Mawr College

In March 1921, Hepburn, 13, and her 15-year-old brother Tom were visiting New York, staying with a friend of their mother's in Greenwich Village over the Easter break. On March 30, Hepburn discovered the body of her adored older brother dead from an apparent suicide. He had tied a curtain tie around a beam and hanged himself. The Hepburn family denied it was suicide and maintained that Tom's death must have been an experiment that had gone wrong. The incident made the teenage Hepburn nervous, moody, and suspicious of people. She shied away from other children, dropped out of Oxford School (now Kingswood-Oxford School) and was tutored privately. For many years she used Tom's birthday (November 8) as her own. It was not until her 1991 autobiography, Me: Stories of My Life, that Hepburn revealed her true birth date.

In 1924, Hepburn was admitted to Bryn Mawr College. She initially agreed to attend the institution to satisfy her mother, who had studied there, but ultimately found the experience to be unfulfilling. It was the first time she had been in school for several years, and she was self-conscious and uncomfortable with her classmates. She struggled with the scholastic demands of university, and once was suspended for smoking in her room. Hepburn was drawn to acting, but roles in college plays were conditional on good grades. Once her marks had improved, she began performing regularly. One of her fellow actresses at Bryn Mawr was Margaret Barker whom she befriended. She performed the lead role in a production of The Woman in the Moon in her senior year, and the positive response it received cemented Hepburn's plans to pursue a theatrical career. She graduated with a degree in history and philosophy in June 1928.

== Career ==
=== Breaking into theatre (1928–1932) ===
Hepburn left college determined to become an actress. The day after graduating, she traveled to Baltimore to meet Edwin H. Knopf, who ran a successful repertory theatre company. Impressed by her eagerness, Knopf cast Hepburn in The Czarina. She received good reviews for her small role and the Printed Word described her performance as "arresting". She was given a part in the following week's show, but in that performance Hepburn was criticized for her shrill voice. She left Baltimore to study with Frances Robinson-Duff, a renowned voice teacher in New York City.

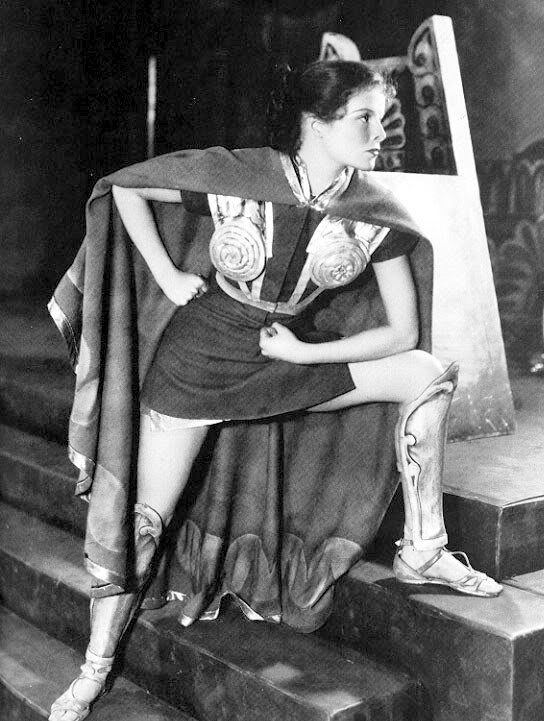
Hepburn in the 1932 role that brought her to the attention of Hollywood, The Warrior's Husband

Knopf decided to produce The Big Pond in New York and appointed Hepburn as understudy to the leading lady. A week before opening, the lead was fired and replaced with Hepburn, which gave her a starring role only four weeks into her theatre career. On opening night, she turned up late, mixed her lines, tripped over her feet, and spoke too quickly to be understood. She was immediately fired, and the original leading lady rehired. Undeterred, Hepburn joined forces with the producer Arthur Hopkins and accepted the role of a schoolgirl in These Days. Her Broadway debut came on November 12, 1928, at the Cort Theatre, but reviews for the show were poor, and it closed after eight nights. Hopkins promptly hired Hepburn as the lead understudy in Philip Barry's play Holiday. In early December, after only two weeks, she quit to marry Ludlow Ogden Smith, a college acquaintance. She planned to leave the theatre behind but began to miss the work and quickly resumed the understudy role in Holiday, which she held for six months.

In 1929, Hepburn turned down a role with the Theatre Guild to play the lead in Death Takes a Holiday. She felt the role was perfect, but again, she was fired. She went back to the Guild and took an understudy role for minimum pay in A Month in the Country. In the spring of 1930, Hepburn joined the Berkshire Playhouse theater company in Stockbridge, Massachusetts. She left halfway through the summer season and continued studying with a drama tutor. In early 1931, she was cast in the Broadway production of Art and Mrs. Bottle. She was released from the role after the playwright took a dislike to her, saying "She looks a fright, her manner is objectionable, and she has no talent", but Hepburn was re-hired when no other actress could be found. It went on to be a small success.

Hepburn appeared in a number of plays with a summer stock company in Ivoryton, Connecticut, and she proved to be a hit. During the summer of 1931, Philip Barry asked her to appear in his new play, The Animal Kingdom, alongside Leslie Howard. They began rehearsals in November, Hepburn feeling sure the role would make her a star, but Howard disliked the actress and again she was fired. When she asked Barry why she had been let go, he responded, "Well, to be brutally frank, you weren't very good." This unsettled the self-assured Hepburn, but she continued to look for work. She took a small role in an upcoming play, but as rehearsals began, she was asked to read for the lead in the Greek fable The Warrior's Husband.

The Warrior's Husband proved to be Hepburn's breakout performance. Biographer Charles Higham states that the role was ideal for the actress, requiring an aggressive energy and athleticism, and she enthusiastically involved herself with its production. The play opened March 11, 1932, at the Morosco Theatre on Broadway. Hepburn's first entrance called for her to leap down a narrow stairway with a stag over her shoulder, wearing a short silver tunic. The show ran for three months, and Hepburn received positive reviews. Richard Garland of the New York World-Telegram wrote, "It's been many a night since so glowing a performance has brightened the Broadway scene."

=== Hollywood success (1932–1934) ===
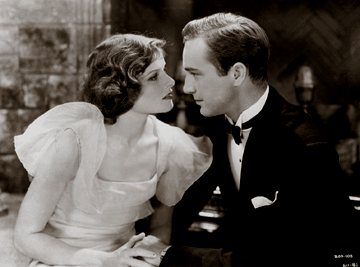
Hepburn's first movie appearance, in the melodrama A Bill of Divorcement (1932). Critics praised her performance, and she became an instant star.

A scout for the Hollywood agent Leland Hayward spotted Hepburn's appearance in The Warrior's Husband, and asked her to test for the part of Sydney Fairfield in the upcoming RKO film A Bill of Divorcement. Director George Cukor was impressed by what he saw: "There was this odd creature", he recalled, "she was unlike anybody I'd ever heard." He particularly liked the manner in which she picked up a glass: "I thought she was very talented in that action." Offered the role, Hepburn demanded $1,500 a week, a large amount for an unknown actress. Cukor encouraged the studio to accept her demands and they signed Hepburn to a temporary contract with a three-week guarantee. RKO head David O. Selznick recounted that he took a "tremendous chance" in casting the unusual actress.

Hepburn arrived in California in July 1932, at 25 years old. She starred in A Bill of Divorcement opposite John Barrymore, but showed no sign of intimidation. Although she struggled to adapt to the nature of film acting, Hepburn was fascinated by the industry from the start. The picture was a success and Hepburn received positive reviews. Mordaunt Hall of The New York Times called her performance "exceptionally fine ... Miss Hepburn's characterization is one of the finest seen on the screen". The Variety review declared, "Standout here is the smash impression made by Katharine Hepburn in her first picture assignment. She has a vital something that sets her apart from the picture galaxy." On the strength of A Bill of Divorcement, RKO signed her to a long-term contract. George Cukor became a lifetime friend and colleague—he and Hepburn made ten films together.

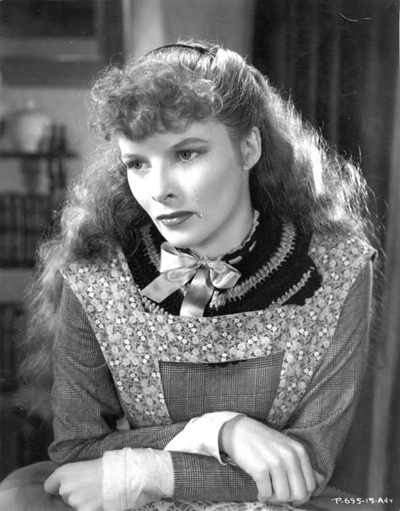
As Jo March in Little Women (1933), which was one of the most popular movies of its day

Hepburn's second film was Christopher Strong (1933), the story of an aviator and her affair with a married man. The picture was not commercially successful, but Hepburn's reviews were good. Regina Crewe wrote in the Journal-American that although her mannerisms were grating, "they compel attention, and they fascinate an audience. She is a distinct, definite, positive personality." Hepburn's third picture confirmed her as a major actress in Hollywood. For playing aspiring actress Eva Lovelace—a role intended for Constance Bennett—in Morning Glory, she won an Academy Award for Best Actress. She had seen the script on the desk of producer Pandro S. Berman and, convinced that she was born to play the part, insisted that the role be hers. Hepburn chose not to attend the awards ceremony—as she would not for the duration of her career—but was thrilled with the win. Her success continued with the role of Jo in the film Little Women (1933). The picture was a hit, one of the film industry's biggest successes to date, and Hepburn won the Best Actress prize at the Venice Film Festival. Little Women was one of Hepburn's personal favorites and she was proud of her performance, later saying, "I defy anyone to be as good [as Jo] as I was".

By the end of 1933, Hepburn was a respected film actress, but she yearned to prove herself on Broadway. Jed Harris, one of the most successful theatre producers of the 1920s, was going through a career slump. He asked Hepburn to appear in the play The Lake, which she agreed to do for a low salary. Before she was given leave, RKO asked that she film Spitfire (1934). Hepburn's role in the movie was Trigger Hicks, an uneducated mountain girl. Though it did well at the box office, Spitfire is widely considered one of Hepburn's worst films, and she received poor reviews for the effort. Hepburn kept a photo of herself as Hicks in her bedroom throughout her life to "[keep] me humble".

The Lake previewed in Washington, D.C., where there was a large advance sale. Harris' poor direction had eroded Hepburn's confidence, and she struggled with the performance. Despite this, Harris moved the play to New York without further rehearsal. It opened at the Martin Beck Theatre on December 26, 1933, and Hepburn was roundly panned by the critics. Dorothy Parker quipped, "She runs the gamut of emotions all the way from A to B." Already tied to a ten-week contract, she had to endure the embarrassment of rapidly declining box office sales. Harris decided to take the show to Chicago, saying to Hepburn, "My dear, the only interest I have in you is the money I can make out of you." Hepburn did not want to continue in a failing show, so she paid Harris $14,000, most of her life savings, to close the production instead. She later referred to Harris as "hands-down the most diabolical person I have ever met", and claimed this experience was important in teaching her to take responsibility for her career.

=== Career setbacks (1934–1938) ===
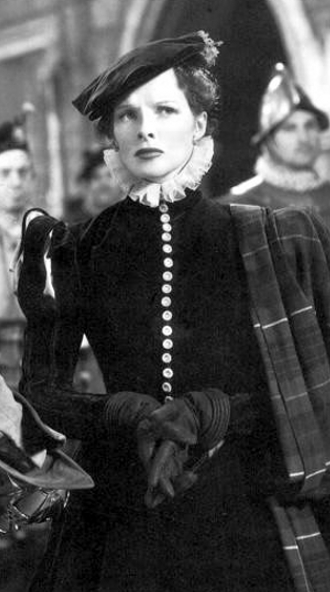
In Mary of Scotland (1936), one of a series of unsuccessful films Hepburn made in this period

After the failure of Spitfire and The Lake, RKO cast Hepburn in The Little Minister (1934), based on a Victorian novel by James Barrie, in an attempt to repeat the success of Little Women. There was no such recurrence, and the picture was a commercial failure. The romantic drama Break of Hearts (1935) with Charles Boyer was poorly reviewed and also lost money. After three forgettable films, success returned to Hepburn with Alice Adams (1935), the story of a girl's desperation to climb the social ladder. Hepburn loved the book and was delighted to be offered the role. The film was a hit, one of Hepburn's personal favorites, and gave the actress her second Oscar nomination. She received the second most votes, after winner Bette Davis.

Given the choice of her next feature, Hepburn decided to star in George Cukor's new project, Sylvia Scarlett (1935), which paired her for the first time with Cary Grant. Her hair was cut short for the part, as her character masquerades as a boy for much of the film. Critics disliked Sylvia Scarlett and it was unpopular with the public. She next played Mary Stuart in John Ford's Mary of Scotland (1936), which met with a similarly poor reception. A Woman Rebels (1936) followed, a Victorian-era drama where Hepburn's character defied convention by having a child out of wedlock. Quality Street (1937) also had a period setting, this time a comedy. Neither movie was popular with the public, which meant she had made four unsuccessful pictures in a row.

Alongside a series of unpopular films, problems arose from Hepburn's attitude. She had a difficult relationship with the press, with whom she could be rude and provocative. When asked if she had any children, she snapped back, "Yes, I have five: two white and three colored." She would not give interviews and denied requests for autographs, which earned her the nickname "Katharine of Arrogance". The public was also baffled by her boyish behavior and fashion choices, and she became a largely unpopular figure. Hepburn sensed that she needed to leave Hollywood, so she returned east to star in a theatrical adaptation of Jane Eyre. It had a successful tour, but, uncertain about the script and unwilling to risk failure after the disaster of The Lake, Hepburn decided against taking the show to Broadway. Towards the end of 1936, Hepburn vied for the role of Scarlett O'Hara in Gone with the Wind. Producer David O. Selznick refused to offer her the part because he felt she had no sex appeal. He reportedly told Hepburn, "I can't see Rhett Butler chasing you for twelve years."

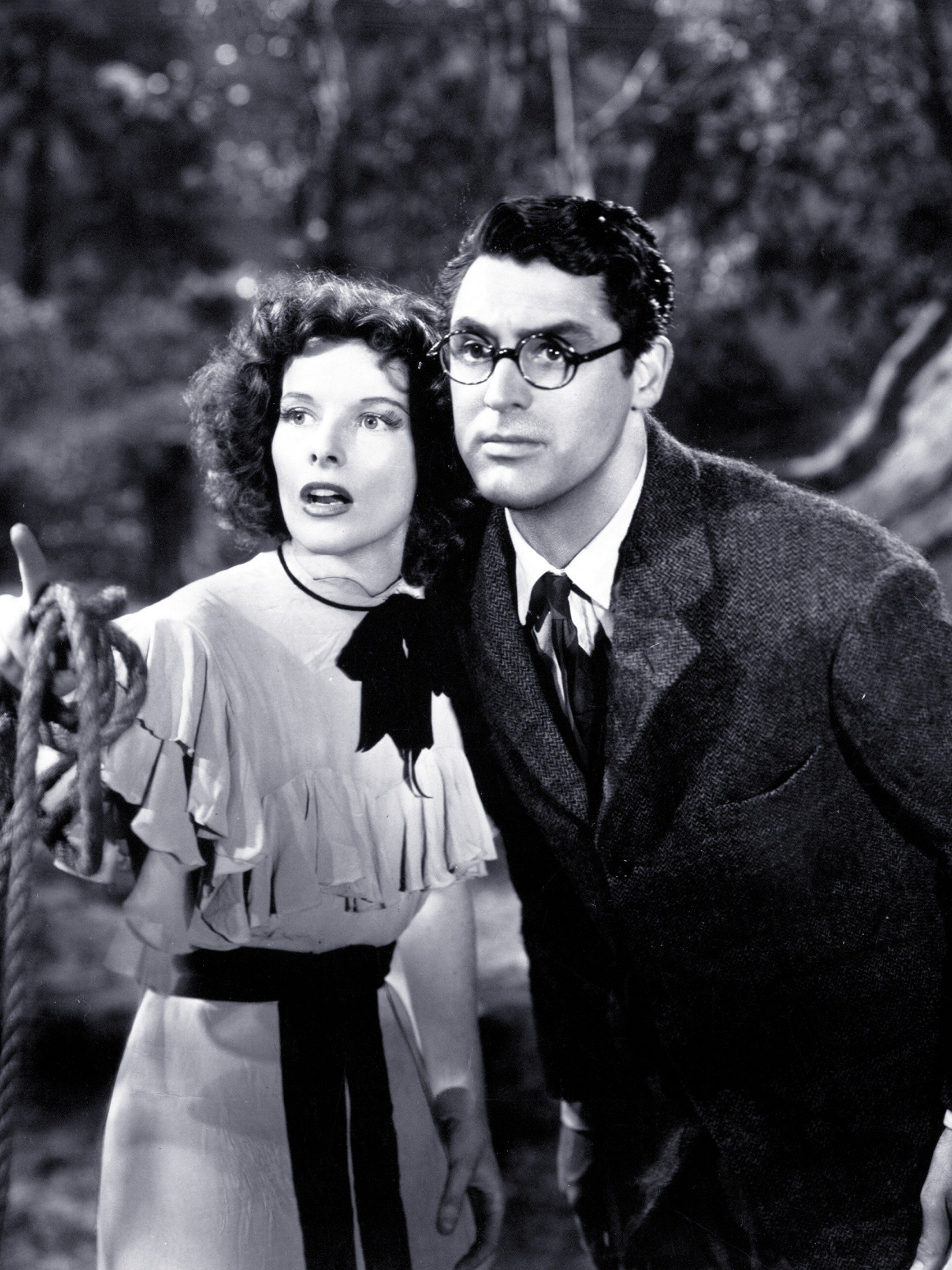
Hepburn made four films with Cary Grant. They are seen here in Bringing Up Baby (1938), which flopped on release, but has since become renowned as a classic screwball comedy.

Hepburn's next feature, Stage Door (1937), paired her with Ginger Rogers in a role that mirrored her own life—that of a wealthy society girl trying to make it as an actress. Hepburn was praised for her work at early previews, which gave her top billing over Rogers. The film was nominated for Best Picture at the Academy Awards, but it was not the box-office hit RKO had hoped for. Industry pundits blamed Hepburn for the small profit, but the studio continued its commitment to resurrecting her popularity. She was cast in Howard Hawks' screwball comedy Bringing Up Baby (1938), where she played a flighty heiress who loses a leopard while trying to woo a palaeontologist (Cary Grant). She approached the physical comedy of the film with confidence, and took tips on comedic timing from her co-star Walter Catlett. Bringing Up Baby was acclaimed by critics, but it was nevertheless unsuccessful at the box office. With the genre and Grant both hugely popular at the time, biographer A. Scott Berg believes the blame lay with moviegoers' rejection of Hepburn.

After the release of Bringing Up Baby, the Independent Theatre Owners of America included Hepburn on a list of actors considered "box office poison". Her reputation at a low, the next film RKO offered her was Mother Carey's Chickens, a B movie with poor prospects. Hepburn turned it down, and instead opted to buy out her contract for $75,000. Many actors were afraid to leave the stability of the studio system at the time, but Hepburn's personal wealth meant she could afford to be independent. She signed on for the film version of Holiday (1938) with Columbia Pictures, pairing her for the third time with Grant, to play a stifled society girl who finds joy with her sister's fiancé. The comedy was positively reviewed, but it failed to draw much of an audience, and the next script offered to Hepburn came with a salary of $10,000—less than she had received at the start of her film career. Reflecting on this change in fortunes, Andrew Britton writes of Hepburn, "No other star has emerged with greater rapidity or with more ecstatic acclaim. No other star, either, has become so unpopular so quickly for so long a time."

=== Revival (1939–1942) ===
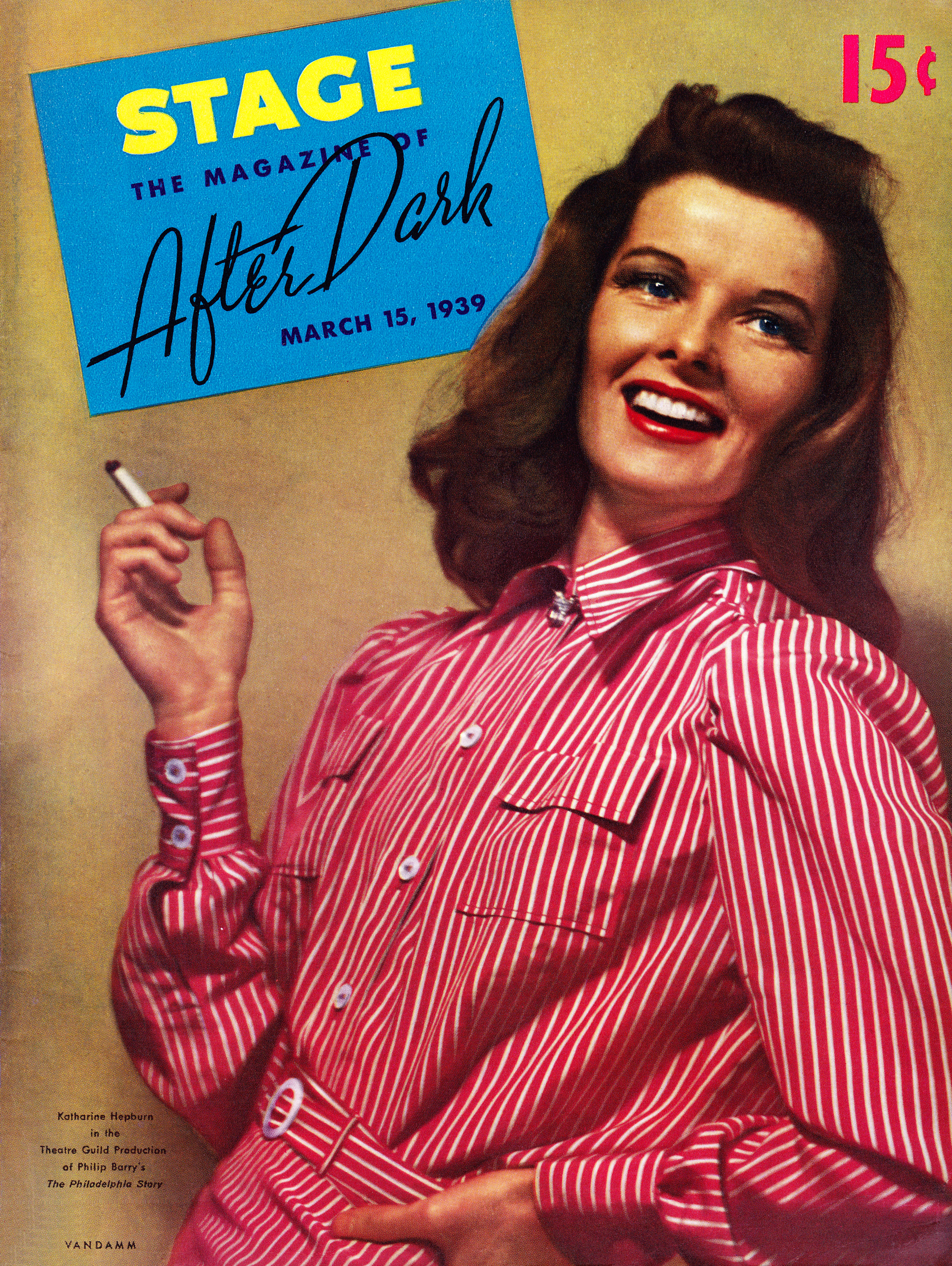
Hepburn on Broadway in The Philadelphia Story (1939)

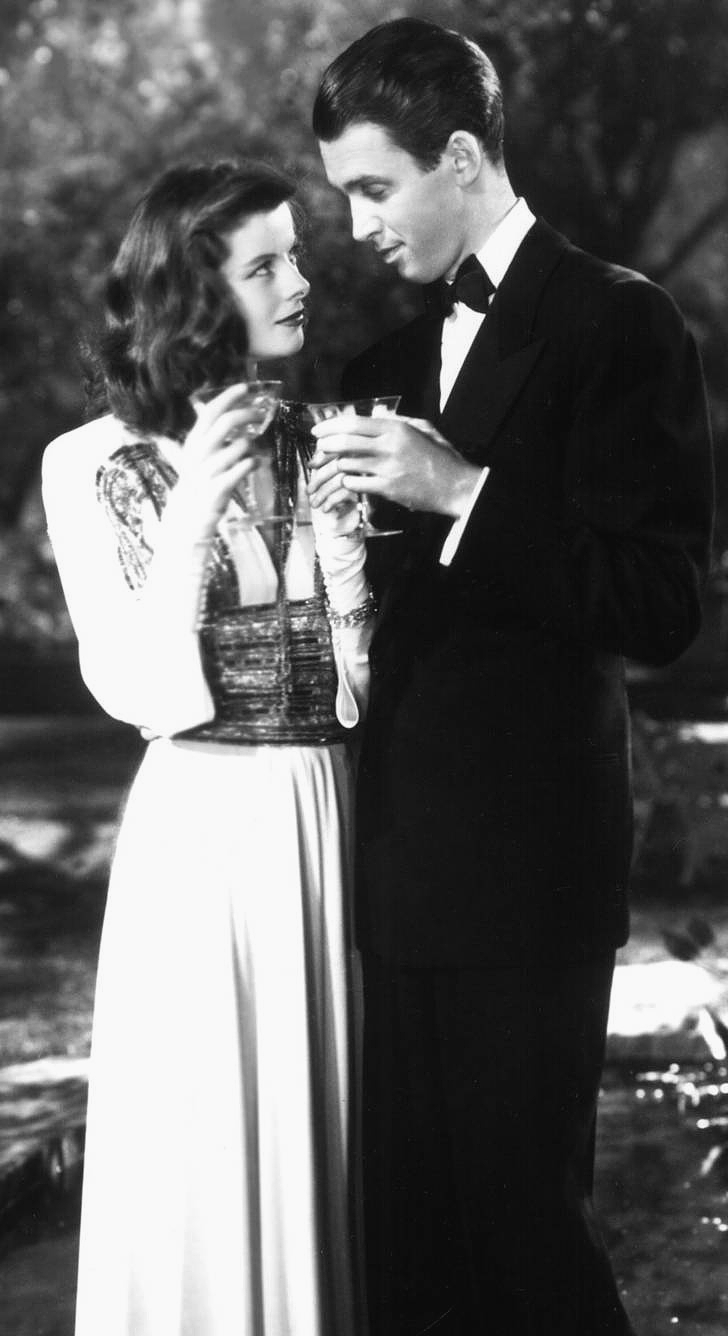
As Tracy Lord in The Philadelphia Story (1940), alongside James Stewart. Hepburn said of the role, "I gave her life, and she gave me back my career."

Following this decline in her career, Hepburn took action to create her own comeback vehicle. She left Hollywood to look for a stage project, and signed on to star in Philip Barry's new play, The Philadelphia Story. It was tailored to showcase the actress, with the character of socialite Tracy Lord incorporating a mixture of humor, aggression, nervousness, and vulnerability. Howard Hughes, Hepburn's partner at the time, sensed that the play could be her ticket back to Hollywood stardom and bought her the film rights before it even debuted on stage. The Philadelphia Story first toured the United States, to positive reviews, and then opened in New York at the Shubert Theatre on March 28, 1939. It was a big hit, critically and financially, running for 417 performances and then going on a second successful tour.

Several of the major film studios approached Hepburn to produce the movie version of Barry's play. She chose to sell the rights to Metro-Goldwyn-Mayer (MGM), Hollywood's number one studio, on the condition that she be the star. As part of the deal she also received the director of her choice, George Cukor, and picked James Stewart and Cary Grant (to whom she ceded top-billing) as co-stars. Before filming began, Hepburn shrewdly noted, "I don't want to make a grand entrance in this picture. Moviegoers ... think I'm too la-di-da or something. A lot of people want to see me fall flat on my face." Thus the film began with Grant knocking the actress flat on her backside. Berg describes how the character was crafted to have audiences "laugh at her enough that they would ultimately sympathize with her", which Hepburn felt was crucial in "recreating" her public image. The Philadelphia Story was one of the biggest hits of 1940, breaking records at Radio City Music Hall. The review in Time declared, "Come on back, Katie, all is forgiven." Herb Golden of Variety stated, "It's Katharine Hepburn's picture ... The perfect conception of all flighty, but characterful, Main Line socialite gals rolled into one, the story without her is almost inconceivable." Hepburn was nominated for her third Academy Award for Best Actress, and won the New York Film Critics Circle Award for Best Actress while Stewart won his only Academy Award for Best Actor for his performance.

Hepburn was also responsible for the development of her next project, the romantic comedy Woman of the Year about a political columnist and a sports reporter whose relationship is threatened by her self-centered independence. The idea for the film was proposed to her in 1941 by Garson Kanin, who recalled how Hepburn contributed to the script. She presented the finished product to MGM and demanded $250,000—half for her, half for the authors. Her terms accepted, Hepburn was also given the director and co-star of her choice, George Stevens and Spencer Tracy. On Hepburn and Tracy's first day on set together, she allegedly told Tracy "I'm afraid I'm too tall for you" to which Tracy replied, "Don't worry Miss Hepburn, I'll soon cut you down to my size." It started a relationship on screen and off that lasted until Tracy's death in 1967 with them appearing in another eight films together. Released in 1942, Woman of the Year was another success. Critics praised the chemistry between the stars, and, says Higham, noted Hepburn's "increasing maturity and polish". The World-Telegram commended two "brilliant performances", and Hepburn received a fourth Academy Award nomination. During the course of the movie, Hepburn signed a star contract with MGM.

=== Slowing in the 1940s (1942–1949) ===
In 1942, Hepburn returned to Broadway to appear in another Philip Barry play, Without Love, which was also written with the actress in mind. Critics were unenthusiastic about the production, but with Hepburn's popularity at a high, it ran for 16 sold-out weeks. MGM was eager to reunite Tracy and Hepburn for a new picture and settled on Keeper of the Flame (1942). A dark mystery with a propaganda message on the dangers of fascism, the film was seen by Hepburn as an opportunity to make a worthy political statement. It received poor notices, but was a financial success, confirming the popularity of the Tracy–Hepburn pairing.

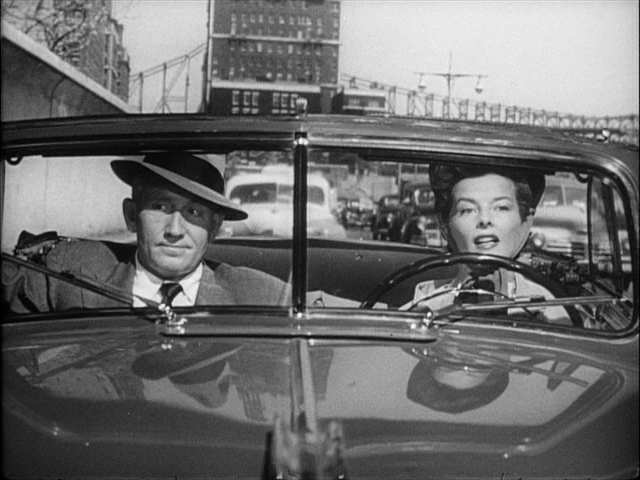
The majority of films Hepburn did in this period were with Spencer Tracy. She later said the partnership did much to advance her career, as he was the more popular star at the time. Seen here in Adam's Rib (1949).

Since Woman of the Year, Hepburn had committed to a romantic relationship with Tracy and dedicated herself to helping the star, who suffered from alcoholism and insomnia. Her career slowed as a result, and she worked less for the remainder of the decade than she had done in the 1930s—notably by not appearing on stage again until 1950. Her only appearance in 1943 was a cameo in the morale-building wartime film Stage Door Canteen, playing herself. She took an atypical role in 1944, playing a Chinese peasant in the high-budget drama Dragon Seed. Hepburn was enthusiastic about the film, but it met with a tepid response and she was described as miscast. She then reunited with Tracy for the film version of Without Love (1945), after which she turned down a role in The Razor's Edge to support Tracy through his return to Broadway. Without Love received poor reviews, but a new Tracy–Hepburn picture was a big event and it was popular on release, selling a record number of tickets over the Easter weekend in 1945.

Hepburn's next film was Undercurrent (1946), a film noir with Robert Taylor and Robert Mitchum that was poorly received. A fourth film with Tracy came in 1947: a drama set in the American Old West entitled The Sea of Grass. Similarly to Keeper of the Flame and Without Love, a lukewarm response from critics did not stop it from being a financial success both at home and abroad. The same year, Hepburn portrayed Clara Wieck Schumann in Song of Love. She trained intensively with a pianist for the role. By the time of its release in October, Hepburn's career had been significantly affected by her public opposition to the growing anti-communist movement in Hollywood. Viewed by some as dangerously progressive, she was not offered work for nine months and people reportedly threw things at screenings of Song of Love. Her next film role came unexpectedly, as she agreed to replace Claudette Colbert only days before shooting began on Frank Capra's political drama State of the Union (1948). Tracy had long been signed to play the male lead, and so Hepburn was already familiar with the script and stepped up for the fifth Tracy–Hepburn picture. Critics responded positively to the film and it performed well at the box-office.

Tracy and Hepburn appeared onscreen together for a third consecutive year in the 1949 film Adam's Rib. Like Woman of the Year, it was a "battle of the sexes" comedy and was written specifically for the duo by their friends Garson Kanin and Ruth Gordon. A story of married lawyers who oppose each other in court, Hepburn described it as "perfect for [Tracy] and me". Although her political views still prompted scattered picketing at theatres around the country, Adam's Rib was a hit, favorably reviewed and the most profitable Tracy–Hepburn picture to date. The New York Times critic Bosley Crowther was full of praise for the film and hailed the duo's "perfect compatibility".

=== Professional expansion (1950–1952) ===
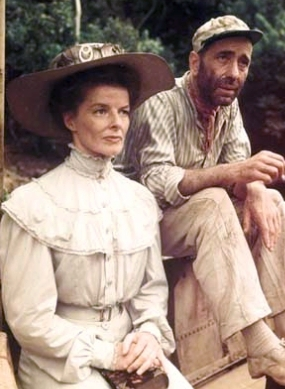
Hepburn often worked abroad in the 1950s, beginning with The African Queen with co-star Humphrey Bogart.

The 1950s saw Hepburn take on a series of professional challenges, and stretch herself further than at any other point in her life at an age when most other actresses began to retreat. Berg describes the decade as "the heart of her vast legacy" and "the period in which she truly came into her own". In January 1950, Hepburn ventured into Shakespeare, playing Rosalind on stage in As You Like It. She hoped to prove that she could play already established material, and said, "It's better to try something difficult and flop than to play it safe all the time." It opened on Broadway at the Cort Theatre in New York to a capacity audience and was virtually sold out for 148 shows. The production then went on tour. Reviews for Hepburn varied, but she was noted as the only leading lady in Hollywood who was performing high-caliber material onstage.

In 1951, Hepburn filmed The African Queen, her first movie in Technicolor. She played Rose Sayer, a prim missionary living in German East Africa at the outbreak of World War I. Co-starring Humphrey Bogart, The African Queen was shot mostly on location in the Belgian Congo, an opportunity Hepburn embraced. It proved a difficult experience, however, and Hepburn became ill with dysentery during filming. Later in life, she released a memoir about the experience. The movie was released at the end of 1951 to popular support and critical acclaim, and gave Hepburn her fifth Best Actress nomination at the Academy Awards while garnering Bogart his only Academy Award for Best Actor. The first successful film she had made without Tracy since The Philadelphia Story a decade earlier, it proved that she could be a hit without him and fully re-established her popularity.

Hepburn went on to make the sports comedy Pat and Mike (1952), the second film written specifically as a Tracy–Hepburn vehicle by Kanin and Gordon. She was a keen athlete, and Kanin later described this as his inspiration for the film: "As I watched Kate playing tennis one day ... it occurred to me that her audience was missing a treat." Hepburn was under pressure to perform several sports to a high standard, many of which did not end up in the film. Pat and Mike was one of the team's most popular and critically acclaimed films, and it was also Hepburn's personal favorite of the nine films she made with Tracy. The performance brought her a nomination for the Golden Globe Award for Best Actress – Motion Picture Musical or Comedy.

In the summer of 1952, Hepburn appeared in London's West End for a ten-week run of George Bernard Shaw's The Millionairess. Her parents had read Shaw to her when she was a child, which made the play a special experience for the actress. Two years of intense work had left her exhausted, however, and her friend Constance Collier wrote that Hepburn was "on the verge of a nervous breakdown". Widely acclaimed, The Millionairess was taken to Broadway. In October 1952 it opened at the Shubert Theatre, where despite a lukewarm critical response it sold out its ten-week run. Hepburn subsequently tried to get the play adapted into a film: a script was written by Preston Sturges, and she offered to work for nothing and pay the director herself, but no studio picked up the project. She later referred to this as the biggest disappointment of her career.

=== Mid-career and Shakespeare (1953–1962) ===
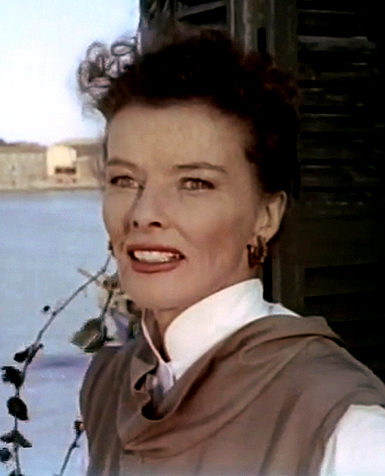
In David Lean's romantic drama Summertime (1955), one of several "spinster" roles Hepburn played in the 1950s.

Pat and Mike was the last film Hepburn completed on her MGM contract, making her free to select her own projects. She spent two years resting and traveling, before committing to David Lean's romantic drama Summertime (1955). The movie was filmed in Venice, with Hepburn playing an unmarried woman who has a passionate love affair. She described it as "a very emotional part" and found it fascinating to work with Lean. At her own insistence, Hepburn performed a fall into a canal and developed a chronic eye infection as a result. The role earned her another Academy Award nomination and has been cited as some of her finest work. Lean later said it was his personal favorite of the films he made, and Hepburn his favorite actress. The following year, Hepburn spent six months touring Australia with the Old Vic theatre company, playing Portia in The Merchant of Venice, Kate in The Taming of the Shrew, and Isabella in Measure for Measure. The tour was successful and Hepburn earned significant plaudits for the effort.

Hepburn received an Academy Award nomination for the second year running for her work opposite Burt Lancaster in The Rainmaker (1956). Hepburn further solidified a screen persona centered on mature, independent, and often unmarried women who found agency through romance, an archetype that earned public favor during this period. Hepburn said of playing such roles, "With Lizzie Curry [The Rainmaker] and Jane Hudson [Summertime] and Rosie Sayer [The African Queen]—I was playing me. It wasn't difficult for me to play those women, because I'm the maiden aunt." Less success that year came from The Iron Petticoat (1956), a reworking of the classic Greta Garbo comedy Ninotchka. Starring opposite Bob Hope, Hepburn played a cold-hearted Soviet pilot, in a performance Bosley Crowther called "horrible". The film was a critical and commercial failure, and Hepburn considered it the worst movie of her career.

Tracy and Hepburn reunited on screen for the first time in five years for the office-based comedy Desk Set (1957). Berg notes that it worked as a hybrid of their earlier romantic-comedy successes, but it performed poorly at the box-office. That summer, Hepburn returned to Shakespeare. Appearing in Stratford, Connecticut, at the American Shakespeare Theatre, she repeated her Portia in The Merchant of Venice and played Beatrice in Much Ado About Nothing. The shows were positively received.

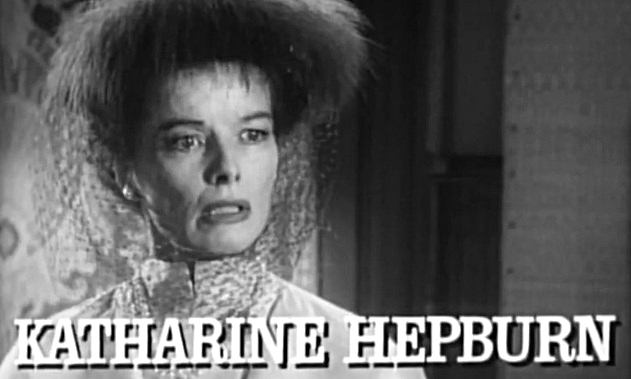
From the trailer for Suddenly, Last Summer (1959), based on the play by Tennessee Williams

After two years away from the screen, Hepburn starred in a film adaptation of Tennessee Williams' controversial play Suddenly, Last Summer (1959) with Elizabeth Taylor and Montgomery Clift. The movie was shot in London and was "a completely miserable experience" for Hepburn. She clashed with director Joseph L. Mankiewicz during filming, which culminated with her spitting at him in disgust. The picture was a financial success, and her work as creepy aunt Violet Venable gave Hepburn her eighth Oscar nomination. Williams was pleased with the performance, writing, "Kate is a playwright's dream-actress. She makes dialogue sound better than it is by a matchless beauty and clarity of diction". He wrote The Night of the Iguana (1961) with Hepburn in mind, but the actress, although flattered, felt the play was wrong for her and declined the part, which went to Deborah Kerr.

Hepburn returned to Stratford in the summer of 1960 to play Viola in Twelfth Night, and Cleopatra in Antony and Cleopatra. The New York Post wrote of her Cleopatra, "Hepburn offers a highly versatile performance ... once or twice going in for her famous mannerisms and always being fascinating to watch." Hepburn herself was proud of the role. Her repertoire was further improved when she appeared in Sidney Lumet's film version of Eugene O'Neill's Long Day's Journey Into Night (1962). It was a low-budget production, and she appeared in the film for a tenth of her established salary. She called it "the greatest [play] this country has ever produced" and the role of morphine-addicted Mary Tyrone "the most challenging female role in American drama", and felt her performance was the best screen work of her career. Long Day's Journey Into Night earned Hepburn an Oscar nomination and the Best Actress Award at the Cannes Film Festival. It remains one of her most praised performances.

=== Success in later years (1963–1970) ===
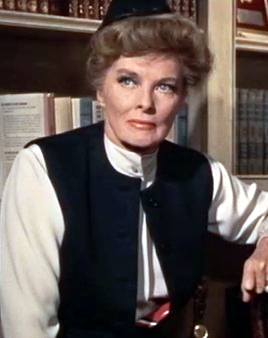
In Guess Who's Coming to Dinner (1967), which won Hepburn her second of four Academy Awards

Following the completion of Long Day's Journey Into Night, Hepburn took a break in her career to care for ailing Spencer Tracy. She did not work again until 1967's Guess Who's Coming to Dinner, her ninth and final film with Tracy. The movie dealt with the subject of interracial marriage, with Hepburn's niece, Katharine Houghton, playing her daughter. Tracy was dying by this point, suffering the effects of diabetes and heart disease, and Houghton later commented that her aunt was "extremely tense" during the production. Tracy died 17 days after filming his last scene. Guess Who's Coming to Dinner was a triumphant return for Hepburn and her most commercially successful picture to that point. She won her second Best Actress Award at the Oscars, 34 years after winning her first. Hepburn felt the award was not just for her but was also given to honor Tracy.

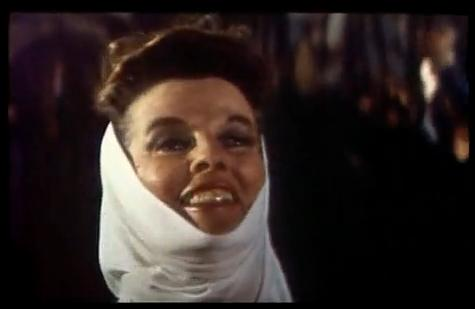
Katharine Hepburn as Eleanor of Aquitaine, her third of four Academy Awards in The Lion in Winter (1968)

Hepburn quickly returned to acting after Tracy's death, choosing to occupy herself as a remedy against grief. She received numerous scripts and chose to play Eleanor of Aquitaine in The Lion in Winter (1968), a part she called "fascinating". She read extensively in preparation for the role, in which she starred opposite Peter O'Toole. Filming took place in Montmajour Abbey in the south of France, an experience she loved despite being—according to director Anthony Harvey—"enormously vulnerable" throughout. John Russell Taylor of The Times suggested that Eleanor was "the performance of her ... career", and proved that she was "a growing, developing, still surprising actress". The movie was nominated in all the major categories at the 41st Academy Awards, and for the second year running Hepburn won the Oscar for Best Actress (shared with Barbra Streisand for Funny Girl). The role, combined with her performance in Guess Who's Coming to Dinner, also received a British Academy Film Award (BAFTA) for Best Actress. Hepburn's next appearance was in The Madwoman of Chaillot (1969), which she filmed in Nice immediately after completing The Lion in Winter. The picture was a failure critically and financially, and reviews targeted Hepburn for giving a misguided performance. By the end of 1969, she was voted the most popular female star in America by Quigley's Top Ten Money Making Stars Poll, making a rare occurrence of an actress over 50 and 60 to achieve such a position.

From December 1969 to August 1970, Hepburn starred in the Broadway musical Coco, about the life of Coco Chanel. She admitted that before the show, she had never sat through a theatrical musical. She was not a strong singer, but found the offer irresistible and, as Berg puts it, "what she lacked in euphony she made up for in guts". The actress took vocal lessons six times a week in preparation for the show. She was nervous about every performance and recalled "wondering what the hell I was doing there". Reviews for the production were mediocre, but Hepburn herself was praised, and Coco was popular with the public—with its run twice extended. She later said Coco marked the first time she accepted that the public was not against her, but actually seemed to love her. Her work earned her a Tony Award nomination for Best Actress in a Musical.

=== Film, television, and theatre (1971–1983) ===
Hepburn stayed active throughout the 1970s, focusing on roles described by Andrew Britton as "either a devouring mother or a batty old lady living [alone]". First she traveled to Spain to film a version of Euripides' The Trojan Women (1971) alongside Vanessa Redgrave. When asked why she had taken the role, she responded that she wanted to broaden her range and try everything while she still had time. The movie was poorly received, but the Kansas City Film Critics Circle named Hepburn's performance the best from an actress that year. In 1971, she signed on to star in an adaptation of Graham Greene's Travels with My Aunt, but was unhappy with early versions of the script and took to rewriting it herself. The studio disliked her changes, so Hepburn abandoned the project and was replaced with Maggie Smith. Her next film, an adaptation of Edward Albee's A Delicate Balance (1973) directed by Tony Richardson, had a small release and received generally unfavorable reviews.

In 1973, Hepburn ventured into television for the first time, starring in a production of Tennessee Williams' The Glass Menagerie. She had been wary of the medium, but it proved to be one of the main television events of the year, scoring high in the Nielsen ratings. Hepburn received an Emmy Award nomination for playing wistful Southern mother Amanda Wingfield, which opened her mind to future work on the small screen. Her next project was the television movie Love Among the Ruins (1975), a London-based Edwardian drama with her friend Laurence Olivier. It received positive reviews and high ratings and earned Hepburn her only Emmy Award.

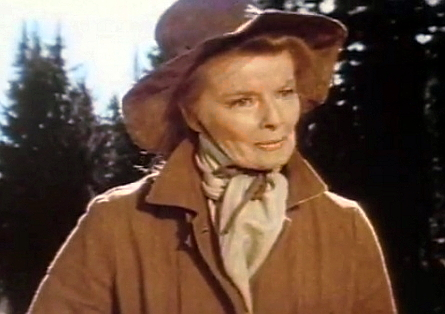
In the western Rooster Cogburn (1975), where Hepburn costarred with John Wayne

Hepburn made her only appearance at the Academy Awards in 1974, to present the Irving G. Thalberg Memorial Award to Lawrence Weingarten. She received a standing ovation, and joked with the audience, "I'm very happy I didn't hear anyone call out, 'It's about time'." The following year, she was paired with John Wayne in the western Rooster Cogburn, a sequel to his Oscar-winning film True Grit. Echoing her African Queen character, Hepburn played a deeply religious unmarried woman who teams up with a masculine loner to avenge a family member's death. The movie received mediocre reviews. Its casting was enough to draw some people to the box office, but it did not meet studio expectations and was only moderately successful.

In 1976, Hepburn returned to Broadway for a three-month run of Enid Bagnold's play A Matter of Gravity. The role of eccentric Mrs. Basil was deemed a perfect showcase for the actress, and the play was popular despite poor reviews. It later went on a successful nationwide tour. During its Los Angeles run, Hepburn fractured her hip, but she chose to continue the tour performing in a wheelchair. That year, she was voted "Favorite Motion Picture Actress" by the People's Choice Awards.

During the summer of 1976, Hepburn starred in the low-budget family film Olly Olly Oxen Free. The feature failed to find a major-studio distributor and was finally released independently in 1978. Because of its poor distribution, it played in relatively few theaters, resulting in one of the biggest misfires of Hepburn's career. The screenwriter James Prideaux, who worked with Hepburn, later wrote that it "died at the moment of release" and referred to it as her "lost film". Hepburn claimed the main reason she had done it was the opportunity to ride in a hot-air balloon. The television movie The Corn Is Green (1979), which was filmed in Wales, followed. It was the last of ten films Hepburn made with George Cukor, and gained her a third Emmy nomination.

By the 1980s, Hepburn had developed a noticeable tremor, giving her a permanently shaking head. She did not work for two years, saying in a television interview, "I've had my day—let the kids scramble and sweat it out." During this period she saw the Broadway production On Golden Pond, and was impressed by its depiction of an elderly married couple coping with the difficulties of old age. Jane Fonda had purchased the screen rights for her father, actor Henry Fonda, and Hepburn sought to play opposite him in the role of quirky Ethel Thayer. On Golden Pond was a success, the second-highest-grossing film of 1981. It demonstrated how energetic the 74-year-old Hepburn was, as she dived fully clothed into Squam Lake and gave a lively singing performance. The film won her a second BAFTA and a record fourth Academy Award. Homer Dickens, in his book on Hepburn, notes that it was widely considered a sentimental win, "a tribute to her enduring career".

Hepburn also returned to the stage in 1981. She received a second Tony nomination for her portrayal in The West Side Waltz of a septuagenarian widow with a zest for life. Variety observed that the role was "an obvious and entirely acceptable version of [Hepburn's] own public image". Walter Kerr of The New York Times wrote of Hepburn and her performance, "One mysterious thing she has learned to do is breathe unchallengeable life into lifeless lines." She hoped to make a film out of the production, but nobody purchased the rights. Hepburn's reputation as one of America's best loved actors was firmly established by this point, as she was named favorite movie actress in a survey by People magazine and again won the popularity award from People's Choice.

=== Focus on television (1984–1994) ===
In 1984, Hepburn starred in the dark-comedy Grace Quigley, the story of an elderly woman who enlists a hitman (Nick Nolte) to kill her. Hepburn found humor in the morbid theme, but reviews were negative and the box-office was poor. In 1985, she presented a television documentary about the life and career of Spencer Tracy. The majority of Hepburn's roles from this point were in television movies, which did not receive the critical praise of her earlier work in the medium, but remained popular with audiences. With each release, Hepburn would declare it her final screen appearance, but she continued to take on new roles. She received an Emmy nomination for 1986's Mrs. Delafield Wants to Marry, then two years later returned for the comedy Laura Lansing Slept Here, which allowed her to act with her grandniece, Schuyler Grant.

Hepburn's final film role was in Love Affair (1994). Critics commented that the 87-year-old had lost none of her powerful screen presence.

In 1991, Hepburn released her autobiography, Me: Stories of My Life, which topped best-seller lists for over a year. She returned to television screens in 1992 for The Man Upstairs, co-starring Ryan O'Neal, for which she received a Golden Globe nomination. In 1994, she worked opposite Anthony Quinn in This Can't Be Love, which was largely based on Hepburn's own life, with numerous references to her personality and career. These later roles have been described as "a fictional version of the typically feisty Kate Hepburn character" and critics have remarked that Hepburn was essentially playing herself.

Hepburn's final appearance in a theatrically released film, and her first since Grace Quigley nine years earlier, was Love Affair (1994). At 87 years old, she played a supporting role, alongside Annette Bening and Warren Beatty. It was the only film of Hepburn's career, other than the cameo appearance in Stage Door Canteen, in which she did not play a leading role. Roger Ebert noted that it was the first time she had looked frail, but that the "magnificent spirit" was still there, and said her scenes "steal the show". A writer for The New York Times reflected on the actress's final big-screen appearance: "If she moved more slowly than before, in demeanor, she was as game and modern as she had ever been." Hepburn played her final role in the television film One Christmas (1994), for which she received a Screen Actors Guild Award nomination at 87 years old.

== Personal life ==
=== Public image and character ===
Hepburn was known for being fiercely private, and would not give interviews or talk to fans for much of her career. She distanced herself from the celebrity life and was not interested in a social scene she saw as tedious and superficial. She wore casual clothes that went strongly against convention in an era of glamour. She rarely appeared in public, usually avoided restaurants and once wrestled a camera out of a photographer's hand when he took her picture without asking. Despite her zeal for privacy, she enjoyed her fame and later confessed that she would not have liked the press to ignore her. The protective attitude toward her private life diminished as she aged; beginning with a two-hour-long interview on The Dick Cavett Show in 1973, Hepburn became much more open with the public.

"I strike people as peculiar in some way, although I don't quite understand why. Of course, I have an angular face, an angular body, and, I suppose, an angular personality, which jabs into people."

"I'm a personality as well as an actress. Show me an actress who isn't a personality, and you'll show me a woman who isn't a star."

— Hepburn commenting on her personality

Hepburn's relentless energy and enthusiasm for life are often cited in biographies and her headstrong independence became key to her celebrity status. This self-assurance came with a tendency to be controlling and difficult; her friend Garson Kanin likened her to a schoolmistress and she was famously blunt and outspoken. Katharine Houghton commented that her aunt could be "maddeningly self-righteous and bossy". Hepburn confessed to being, especially early in life, "a me me me person". She saw herself as having a happy nature, reasoning "I like life and I've been so lucky, why shouldn't I be happy?" A. Scott Berg knew Hepburn well in her later years and said that while she was demanding, she retained a sense of humility and humanity.

The actress led an active life, reportedly swimming and playing tennis every morning. In her eighties she was still playing tennis regularly, as indicated in her 1993 documentary All About Me. She also enjoyed painting, which became a passion later in life. Asked about politics, Hepburn told an interviewer, "I always just say be on the affirmative and liberal side. Don't be a 'no' person". The anti-Communist attitude in 1940s Hollywood prompted her to political activity, as she joined the Committee for the First Amendment. Her name was mentioned at the hearings of the House Un-American Activities Committee but Hepburn denied being a Communist sympathizer. Later in life, she openly promoted birth control and supported the legal right to abortion. She described herself as a "dedicated Democrat". She practiced Albert Schweitzer's theory of "Reverence for Life" but did not believe in religion or the afterlife. In 1991, Hepburn told a journalist, "I'm an atheist, and that's it. I believe there's nothing we can know, except that we should be kind to each other and do what we can for other people". Her public declarations of these beliefs led the American Humanist Association to award her the Humanist Arts Award in 1985.

Hepburn as Pandora in the Bryn Mawr College production of The Woman in the Moon (1928)

Hepburn liked to go barefoot; for her first acting role, in the play The Woman in the Moon, she insisted that her character Pandora should not wear shoes. Offscreen, she usually dressed in slacks and sandals, even for formal occasions, such as television interviews. She said that her preference for wearing trousers was due to her feeling that they allowed her to go barefoot. Hepburn's habit of rehearsing barefoot is mentioned in Zora Mendelsohn's 1950 novel Joan Takes a Bow.

=== Relationships ===
Hepburn's only marriage was to Ludlow Ogden Smith, a socialite-businessman from Philadelphia whom she met while a student at Bryn Mawr. The couple wed on December 12, 1928, when she was 21 and he was 29. Smith changed his name to S. Ogden Ludlow at her behest so that she would not be "Kate Smith", which she considered too plain. She never fully committed to the marriage, prioritizing her career. Furthermore, Hepburn's fiery personality did not go well with Smith's calm, quiet demeanor. She was also having an affair with her agent, Leland Hayward. The move to Hollywood in 1932 cemented the couple's estrangement. Hepburn filed for divorce in Mérida, Yucatán, on April 30, 1934, and it was finalized on May 8. Hepburn often expressed her gratitude toward Smith for his financial and moral support in the early days of her career, and in her autobiography she called herself "a terrible pig" for exploiting his love. The pair remained friends until his death in 1979.

Hepburn's affair with Hayward began after she moved to California, although they were both married. Hayward proposed to the actress after they had both divorced, but she declined, later explaining, "I liked the idea of being my own single self." The affair lasted four years. In 1936, while she was touring with Jane Eyre, Hepburn began a relationship with entrepreneur Howard Hughes. She had been introduced to him a year earlier by their mutual friend Cary Grant. Hughes wished to marry her, and the tabloids reported their impending nuptials, but Hepburn stayed focused on resurrecting her failing career. They separated in 1938, when Hepburn left Hollywood after being labeled "box office poison".

Hepburn stuck to her decision not to remarry and made a conscious choice not to have children. She believed that motherhood required a full-time commitment and said it was not one she was willing to make. "I would have been a terrible mother," she told Berg, "because I'm basically a very selfish human being." She felt she had partially experienced parenthood through her much younger siblings, which fulfilled any need to have children of her own.

Rumors have existed since the 1930s that Hepburn was a lesbian or bisexual, which she often joked about. In 2007, William J. Mann released a biography of the actress in which he argued this was the case. In response to this speculation, her niece, Katharine Houghton said, "I've never discovered any evidence whatsoever that she was a lesbian." However, in a 2017 documentary, columnist Liz Smith, who was a close friend, attested that she was.

==== Spencer Tracy ====
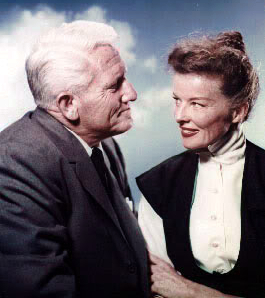
Spencer Tracy and Hepburn in a publicity photo for Desk Set (1957)

The most significant relationship of Hepburn's life was with Spencer Tracy, her co-star in nine films. The 26-year relationship was largely hidden from the public. In her autobiography, she wrote, "It was a unique feeling that I had for [Tracy]. I would have done anything for him." Lauren Bacall, a close friend, later wrote of how "blindingly" in love Hepburn was with the actor. The relationship has subsequently been publicized as one of Hollywood's legendary love affairs.

Hepburn and Tracy met at MGM in 1941, when they were to begin filming Woman of the Year, when she was 34 and he was 41. Tracy was initially wary of Hepburn, unimpressed by her dirty fingernails and suspecting that she was a lesbian, but Hepburn said she "knew right away that [she] found him irresistible". Tracy remained married throughout their relationship. Although he and his wife, Louise, had been living separate lives since the 1930s, there was never an official split and neither party pursued a divorce. Hepburn did not interfere.

With Tracy determined to conceal the relationship with Hepburn from his wife, it had to remain private. They were careful not to be seen in public together and maintained separate residences. Tracy suffered from a severe alcohol addiction and was extremely moody and frequently depressed; Hepburn described him as "tortured", and she devoted herself to making his life easier. Reports from people who saw them together describe how Hepburn's entire demeanor changed when around Tracy. She reportedly mothered and obeyed him, and he soon became dependent on her. They often spent significant stretches of time apart due to their work, especially in the 1950s when Hepburn frequently traveled abroad for film commitments.

Tracy's alcoholism took an immense toll on his health and in the early 1960s, Hepburn took a five-year break in her career to care for him. She moved into Tracy's house for this period and was with him when he died on June 10, 1967. Out of consideration for Tracy's family, she did not attend his funeral. It was only after Louise Tracy's death in 1983, that Hepburn began to speak publicly about her feelings for Tracy, though their relationship had been an open secret for many years. In response to the question of why she stayed with Tracy for so long, despite the nature of their relationship, she said, "I honestly don't know. I can only say that I could never have left him." She claimed to not know how he felt about her, and that they "just passed twenty-seven years together in what was to me absolute bliss".

=== Final years and death ===
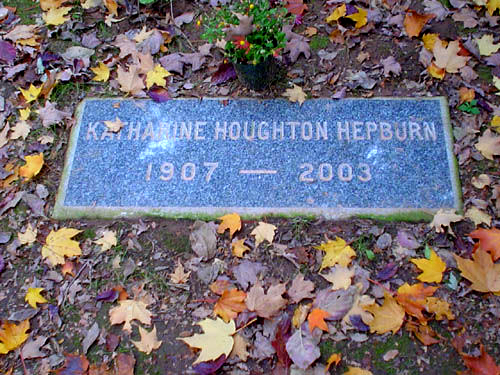
Hepburn's gravestone in Cedar Hill Cemetery

Hepburn stated in her eighties, "I have no fear of death. Must be wonderful, like a long sleep." She was hospitalized in March 1993 for exhaustion, and her health began to deteriorate not long after her final screen appearance. In the winter of 1996, she was hospitalized with pneumonia. By 1997, she had become very weak and was speaking and eating very little, and it was feared she would die. She showed signs of dementia in her final years. By 2000, she was regarded by her niece to be a "private person". In July 2001, she was admitted to a hospital for pneumonia and a urinary tract infection. In May 2003, an aggressive tumor was found in Hepburn's neck. The decision was made not to medically intervene, and she died from cardiac arrest on June 29, 2003, at the Hepburn family home in Fenwick, Connecticut. She was buried in Cedar Hill Cemetery in Hartford. Hepburn requested there be no memorial service.

Hepburn's death received considerable public attention. Many tributes were held on television, and newspapers and magazines dedicated issues to the actress. American president George W. Bush said Hepburn "will be remembered as one of the nation's artistic treasures". In honor of her extensive theatre work, the lights of Broadway were dimmed for the evening of July 1, 2003.

In 2004, in accordance with Hepburn's wishes, her belongings were put up for auction with Sotheby's in New York City. The auction garnered $5.8 million, which Hepburn willed to her family.

== Acting style and screen persona ==
"Her best films were when she was presented as a woman on her high horse with slightly pretentious, often comically stated ideas about the world. It was for men to bring her down and get her to reveal herself as quite a good gal, sporty and democratic. We liked the idea that aristocratic people would be humanized by democratic values—in her case, by slightly rough-necked and good-natured males."

— Film historian and critic Richard Schickel explains the typical Hepburn role and its appeal.

"I liked Katherine Hepburn's face on the screen, no matter what was said about her pretentiousness..."—Novelist F. Scott Fitzgerald in his The Crack-Up, April 1936 Esquire

According to reports, Hepburn was not an instinctive actor. She liked to study the text and character carefully beforehand, making sure she knew them thoroughly, and then to rehearse as much as possible and film multiple takes of a scene. With a genuine passion for acting she committed heavily to each role and insisted on learning any necessary skills and performing stunts herself. She was known to learn not only her own lines but also those of her co-stars. Commenting on her motivation, Stanley Kramer said, "Work, work, work. She can work till everyone drops." Hepburn involved herself in the production of each of her films, making suggestions for the script and stating her opinion on everything from costumes to lighting to camerawork.

The characters Hepburn played were, with very few exceptions, wealthy and intelligent, and often strong and independent. These tough characters tended to be humbled in some form and revealed to have a hidden vulnerability. Garson Kanin described what he called "the formula for a Hepburn success: A high-class, or stuck-up ... girl is brought down to earth by an earthy type, or a lowbrow ... or a cataclysmic situation. It seems to have worked time and time again." Due to this repeated character arc, Hepburn embodied the "contradictions" of the "nature and status of women", and the strong females she depicts are eventually "restored to a safe position within the status quo". Film critic Molly Haskell has commented on the importance of this to Hepburn's career: With an intimidating presence, it was necessary that her characters "do some kind of self-abasement, to stay on the good side of the audience".

Hepburn is one of the most celebrated American actresses, but she has also been criticized for a lack of versatility. Her on-screen persona closely matched her own real personality, something Hepburn admitted herself. In 1991 she told a journalist, "I think I'm always the same. I had a very definite personality, and I liked material that showed that personality." Playwright and author David Macaray has said, "Picture Katharine Hepburn in every movie she ever starred in, and ask yourself if she's not playing, essentially, the same part over and over ... Icon or no icon, let's not confuse a truly fascinating and unique woman with a superior actress." Another repeated criticism is that her demeanor was too cold. Writer and socialite Helen Lawrenson described Hepburn as "the most egregious example" of a classical Hollywood star receiving undue praise for their acting ability, viewing her more as a compelling personality than a distinguished acting talent.

== Legacy ==
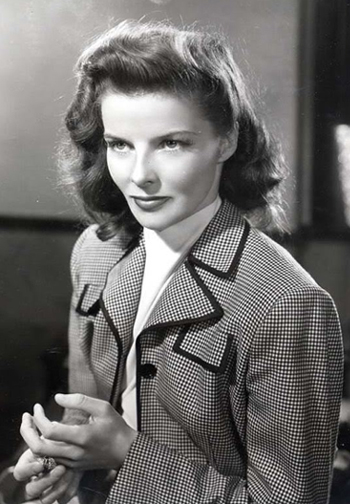
Hepburn, with her unconventional lifestyle and the independent female roles she played on screen (such as Tess Harding in Woman of the Year, pictured), represented the emancipated woman.

Hepburn is considered an important and influential cultural figure. Ros Horton and Sally Simmons included her in their book Women Who Changed The World, which honors 50 women who helped shape world history and culture. She is also named in Encyclopædia Britannica's list of "300 Women Who Changed the World", Ladies Home Journal's book 100 Most Important Women of the 20th century, Variety magazine's "100 Icons of the Century", and she is number 84 on VH1's list of the "200 Greatest Pop Culture Icons of All Time". In 1999, the American Film Institute named Hepburn the "greatest American screen legend" among females.

Regarding Hepburn's film legacy, one of her biographers, Sheridan Morley, said she "broke the mould" for women in Hollywood, where she brought a new breed of strong-willed females to the screen. Film academic Andrew Britton wrote a monograph studying Hepburn's "key presence within classical Hollywood, a consistent, potentially radical disturbance", and pinpoints her "central" influence in bringing feminist issues to the screen.

Off screen, Hepburn's lifestyle was ahead of her time, coming to symbolize the "modern woman" and playing a part in changing gender attitudes. Horton and Simmons write, "Confident, intelligent and witty, four-time Oscar winner Katharine Hepburn defied convention throughout her professional and personal life ... Hepburn provided an image of an assertive woman whom [females] could watch and learn from." After Hepburn's death, film historian Jeanine Basinger stated, "What she brought us was a new kind of heroine—modern and independent. She was beautiful, but she did not rely on that." Mary McNamara, an entertainment journalist and reviewer for the Los Angeles Times wrote, "More than a movie star, Katharine Hepburn was the patron saint of the independent American female." She was not universally revered by feminists, however, who were angered by her public declarations that women "cannot have it all", meaning a family and a career.

Hepburn's legacy extends to fashion, where she pioneered wearing trousers at a time when it was a radical move for a woman. She helped make trousers acceptable for women, and fans began to imitate her clothing. In 1986 she received a Lifetime Achievement Award from the Council of Fashion Designers of America in recognition of her influence on women's fashion.

A number of Hepburn's films have become classics of American cinema, with four of her pictures (The African Queen, The Philadelphia Story, Bringing Up Baby, and Guess Who's Coming to Dinner) featured on the American Film Institute's list of the 100 Greatest American Films of all time. Adam's Rib and Woman of the Year were included in the AFI's list of the Greatest American Comedies. She is considered one of the most distinctive voices in film history with her clipped vocal style and patrician accent.

=== Memorials ===
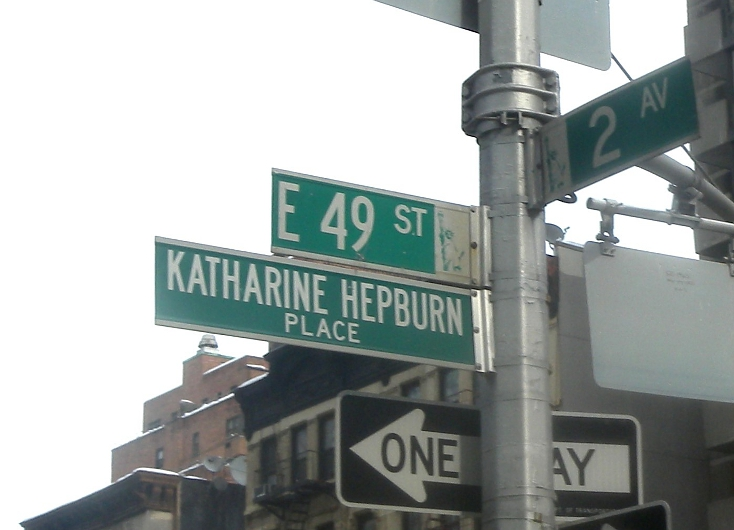
East 49th Street in New York City, named after Katharine Hepburn

Hepburn has been honored with several memorials. The Turtle Bay community in New York City, where she maintained a residence for over 60 years, dedicated a garden in her name located in Dag Hammarskjöld Plaza in 1997. After Hepburn's death in 2003, the intersection of East 49th Street and 2nd Avenue was renamed "Katharine Hepburn Place". Three years later Bryn Mawr College, Hepburn's alma mater, launched the Katharine Houghton Hepburn Center. It is dedicated to both the actress and her mother and encourages women to address important issues affecting their gender. The center awards the annual Katharine Hepburn Medal, which "recognizes women whose lives, work and contributions embody the intelligence, drive and independence of the four-time-Oscar-winning actress" and whose award recipients "are chosen on the basis of their commitment and contributions to the Hepburn women's greatest passions—civic engagement and the arts". The Katharine Hepburn Cultural Arts Center was opened in 2009 in Old Saybrook, Connecticut, the location of the Hepburn family beach home, which she loved and later owned. The building includes a performance space and a Katharine Hepburn Museum that features personal letters, film memorabilia, costumes, and many personal effects.

The Academy of Motion Picture Arts and Sciences library and the New York Public Library hold collections of Hepburn's personal papers. Selections from the New York collection, which documents Hepburn's theatrical career, were presented in a five-month exhibition, Katharine Hepburn: In Her Own Files, in 2009. Other exhibitions have been held to showcase Hepburn's career. One Life: Kate, A Centennial Celebration was held at the National Portrait Gallery in Washington from November 2007 to September 2008. Kent State University exhibited a selection of her film and theatre costumes from October 2010 to September 2011 in Katharine Hepburn: Dressed for Stage and Screen. Hepburn has also been honored with her own postal stamp as part of the "Legends of Hollywood" stamp series. In 2015, the British Film Institute held a two-month retrospective of Hepburn's work.

=== Characterizations ===
Hepburn is the subject of a one-woman play, Tea at Five, written by Matthew Lombardo. The first act features Hepburn in 1938, after being labeled "box-office poison", and the second act in 1983, where she reflects on her life and career. It premiered in 2002 at the Hartford Stage. Hepburn has been portrayed in Tea at Five by Kate Mulgrew, Tovah Feldshuh, Stephanie Zimbalist, and Charles Busch. A revised version of the play, eliminating the first act and expanding the second, premiered on June 28, 2019, at Boston's Huntington Theater with Faye Dunaway playing Hepburn. Feldshuh also appeared as Hepburn in The Amazing Howard Hughes, a 1977 television movie, while Mearle Ann Taylor later portrayed her in The Scarlett O'Hara War (1980). In Martin Scorsese's Howard Hughes biographical film The Aviator, Hepburn was portrayed by Cate Blanchett, which earned her the Academy Award for Best Supporting Actress. This marked the first instance where the portrayal of an Academy Award-winning actress itself won an Academy Award.

== Acting credits ==
During her 66-year career, Hepburn appeared in 44 feature films, 8 television movies, and 33 plays. Her movie career covered a range of genres, including screwball comedies, period dramas, and adaptations of works by top American playwrights. She appeared on film in every decade from the 1930s to the 1990s and on the stage in every decade from the 1920s to the 1980s, performing plays by Shakespeare and Shaw, and a Broadway musical.

Select filmography:

- A Bill of Divorcement (1932)
- Morning Glory (1933)
- Christopher Strong (1933)
- Little Women (1933)
- Alice Adams (1935)
- Mary of Scotland (1936)
- Stage Door (1937)
- Bringing Up Baby (1938)
- Holiday (1938)
- The Philadelphia Story (1940)
- Woman of the Year (1942)
- State of the Union (1948)
- Adam's Rib (1949)
- The African Queen (1951)
- Pat and Mike (1952)
- Summertime (1955)
- The Rainmaker (1956)
- Desk Set (1957)
- Suddenly, Last Summer (1959)
- Long Day's Journey into Night (1962)
- Guess Who's Coming to Dinner (1967)
- The Lion in Winter (1968)
- The Trojan Women (film) (1971)
- Love Among the Ruins (1975)
- Rooster Cogburn (1975)
- On Golden Pond (1981)
- Grace Quigley (1985)
- Love Affair (1994)

Select theatre roles:

- The Warrior's Husband (1932)
- The Philadelphia Story (1939–1941)
- As You Like It (1950)
- The Millionairess (1952)
- The Taming of the Shrew (1955)
- Measure for Measure (1955)
- The Merchant of Venice (1955 and 1957)
- Much Ado About Nothing (1957)
- Twelfth Night (1960)
- Antony and Cleopatra (1960)
- Coco (1969–1970)
- A Matter of Gravity (1976–1977)
- The West Side Waltz (1981)

== Awards and nominations ==
Hepburn won four Academy Awards, the record number for a performer, and received a total of 12 Oscar nominations for Best Actress—a number surpassed only by Meryl Streep. Hepburn also holds the record for the longest time span between first and last Oscar nominations, at 48 years. She received two awards and five nominations from the British Academy Film Awards, one award and six nominations from the Emmy Awards, eight Golden Globe Award nominations, two Tony Award nominations, and awards from the Cannes Film Festival, Venice Film Festival, the New York Film Critics Circle Awards, the People's Choice Awards, and others. Hepburn was inducted into the American Theater Hall of Fame in 1979. She also won a Lifetime Achievement Award from the Screen Actors Guild Awards in 1979 and received the Kennedy Center Honors, which recognize a lifetime of accomplishments in the arts, in 1990.

Hepburn was recognized by the Academy of Motion Picture Arts and Sciences for the following performances:

Year	Ceremony	Award	Results	Works/s
1934	6th Academy Awards	Best Actress	Won	Morning Glory
1936	8th Academy Awards	Best Actress	Nominated	Alice Adams
1941	13th Academy Awards	Best Actress	Nominated	The Philadelphia Story
1943	15th Academy Awards	Best Actress	Nominated	Woman of the Year
1952	24th Academy Awards	Best Actress	Nominated	The African Queen
1956	28th Academy Awards	Best Actress	Nominated	Summertime
1957	29th Academy Awards	Best Actress	Nominated	The Rainmaker
1960	32nd Academy Awards	Best Actress	Nominated	Suddenly, Last Summer
1963	35th Academy Awards	Best Actress	Nominated	Long Day's Journey Into Night
1968	40th Academy Awards	Best Actress	Won	Guess Who's Coming to Dinner
1969	41st Academy Awards	Best Actress	Won	The Lion in Winter (tied with Barbra Streisand for Funny Girl)
1982	54th Academy Awards	Best Actress	Won	On Golden Pond

== See also ==
- List of American film actresses
- List of Academy Award records — Acting
- List of actors with Academy Award nominations
- List of actors with two or more Academy Awards in acting categories
- List of actors with more than one Academy Award nomination in the acting categories
- List of oldest and youngest Academy Award winners — Oldest winners for Best Lead Actress
- List of LGBTQ Academy Award winners and nominees — Best Lead Actress nominees alleged to be LGBTQ
- List of Golden Globe winners
- List of Primetime Emmy Award winners
- List of actors with Hollywood Walk of Fame motion picture stars
- List of stars on the Hollywood Walk of Fame
- List of barefooters
- List of atheists in film, radio, television and theater
