= James Prideaux =

American playwright

James Prideaux (August 29, 1927 – November 18, 2015) was an American playwright known for The Last of Mrs. Lincoln.

Prideaux was born in 1927 as James Priddy in South Bend, Indiana, the son of Lloyd Priddy, a professional photographer, and Beulah Shirey.

Wanting to become an actor, he adopted a new name and relocated to Chicago and then New York, but found his metier as a writer. He wrote for magazines such as Playboy and the Ladies Home Journal and joined the Barr-Wilder-Albee Playwrights Unit, a theater workshop.

For The Last of Mrs Lincoln, he won the Drama Desk Award for Most Promising Playwright in 1973. He also wrote Postcards, Lemonade, The Orphans, Laughter in the Shadow of the Trees, and Abraham Lincoln Dies at Versailles.

Moving to television, he wrote The Secret Storm. He became friends with Katharine Hepburn, who acted in many of his films, such as Mrs. Delafield Wants to Marry (1986), Laura Lansing Slept Here (1988), The Man Upstairs (1992). He received a Primetime Emmy nomination for Outstanding Television Movie for producing Mrs. Delafield Wants to Marry. In 1996, he published his memoirs Knowing Hepburn and Other Curious Experiences.

He died of a stroke in West Hills, Los Angeles on November 18, 2015.
