= A Matter of Gravity =

1967 play by Enid Bagnold

A Matter of Gravity is a play by Enid Bagnold.

== Overview ==
The eccentric dowager Mrs. Basil chooses to live in only one room of her Oxford mansion. Her quiet existence is disrupted by the arrival of her grandson Nicky and four of his friends and new cook-housekeeper Dubois, who startles the mistress of the house by levitating in the air. The miracle confounds Mrs. Basil, who begins to question her lifelong belief that God does not exist.

== Productions ==
Originally produced as Call Me Jacky at The Oxford Playhouse (Oxford, UK) in 1967, starring Sybil Thorndike, the play eventually caught the attention of producer Robert Whitehead, who viewed it as an ideal star vehicle for Katharine Hepburn. Hepburn agreed to commit to a pre-Broadway tryout run of six weeks (which ultimately was expanded to twelve), a twelve-week engagement in New York City, and a subsequent six-month national tour.

The play had pre-Broadway engagements in Philadelphia, Washington, D.C., New Haven, Connecticut, Boston, and Toronto.

The play opened on Broadway on February 3, 1976, at the Broadhurst Theatre, where it ran for 79 performances. In addition to Hepburn, the cast included Christopher Reeve as Nicky and Charlotte Jones as Dubois. The director was Noel Willman.

While the play garnered mediocre reviews, critics — particularly Clive Barnes of The New York Times, who wrote a lengthy feature praising the actress for the February 15 Sunday Arts & Leisure section — were charmed by Hepburn's performance. Barnes wrote: "Miss Hepburn with her radiantly raddled beauty, her grace and meticulous theatrical sensibility—shown in the jerk of an eyebrow, the twitch of a corner of the mouth—is per fectly remarkable."

Nine weeks into the run, Hepburn asked to be released from her contract in order to film Olly Olly Oxen Free, and the production shut down. In October she started the national tour in Denver, then proceeded to Vancouver, San Francisco, and Los Angeles where, a few days after opening at Ahmanson Theatre, she fractured her ankle. After missing two performances, she returned to the play in a wheelchair. Following Los Angeles, the tour continued to Chicago's Merle Reskin Theatre, San Diego and Phoenix, where it closed in March 1977. She made national headlines when, during a Vancouver performance, Hepburn was angered by an audience member who took a flash photograph. She called out "freeze", and with the rest of the cast immobile, she wheeled herself to the edge of the stage and lambasted the inconsiderate photographer. The audience reacted with a loud round of applause and the performance continued.

The play's sole Tony Award nomination went to Ben Edwards for Best Scenic Design.
