= Laura Lansing Slept Here =

1988 film by George Schaefer

- Genre: Comedy
- Written by: James Prideaux
- Directed by: George Schaefer
- Starring: Katharine Hepburn; Joel Higgins; Karen Austin; Brenda Forbes
- Music by: Peter Matz
- Country of origin: United States
- Original language: English

Production
- Executive producer: Merrill H. Karpf
- Producers: George Schaefer; James Prideaux
- Production location: Vancouver
- Cinematography: Paul Lohman
- Editor: Rod Stephens
- Running time: 100 minutes
- Production companies: Schaefer/Karpf/Eckstein Productions; Gaylord Productions

Original release
- Network: NBC
- Release: March 7, 1988

Laura Lansing Slept Here is a 1988 American made-for-television comedy film starring Katharine Hepburn and directed by George Schaefer which premiered on NBC on March 7, 1988. It was written by James Prideaux and co-stars Joel Higgins, Karen Austin, Brenda Forbes and Hepburn's grandniece Schuyler Grant.

== Plot ==
Hepburn stars as Laura Lansing, a wealthy, world-famous pampered novelist who faces the crisis of her career when her publisher rejects her latest book. Faced with retirement, she makes a bet to prove that she has not lost touch with her readers: she will live with a middle-class family in the suburbs for seven days or give up writing forever. In the home of Walter and Melody Gomphers, Lansing turns the family's life upside down with her outlandish behavior. She struggles to relate to their children, meddles in the couple's marital matters and jeopardizes the conditions of her bet.

== Cast ==
- Katharine Hepburn as Laura Lansing
- Karen Austin as Melody Gomphers
- Brenda Forbes as Doris
- Joel Higgins as Walter Gomphers
- Lee Richardson as Larry Baumgartner
- Nicolas Surovy as Conway
- Schuyler Grant as Annette Gomphers

== Reception ==
A reviewer from The New York Times noted that Hepburn essentially "played herself" in the movie, and that "it's to Katharine Hepburn's credit that she was able to make so much out of so little."
