= Love Affair (1994 film) =

1994 film by Glenn Gordon Caron

- Theatrical release poster
- Directed by: Glenn Gordon Caron
- Screenplay by: Robert Towne; Warren Beatty
- Story by: Mildred Cram; Leo McCarey
- Based on: Love Affair; 1939 film by Delmer Daves; Donald Ogden Stewart
- Produced by: Warren Beatty
- Starring: Warren Beatty; Annette Bening; Katharine Hepburn; Garry Shandling; Chloe Webb; Pierce Brosnan; Kate Capshaw
- Cinematography: Conrad L. Hall
- Edited by: Robert C. Jones
- Music by: Ennio Morricone
- Distributed by: Warner Bros. Pictures
- Release date: October 21, 1994
- Running time: 108 minutes
- Country: United States
- Language: English
- Budget: $60 million
- Box office: $18.3 million

Love Affair is a 1994 American romantic drama film and a remake of the 1939 film of the same name. It was directed by Glenn Gordon Caron and produced by Warren Beatty from a screenplay by Robert Towne and Beatty, based on the 1939 screenplay by Delmer Daves and Donald Ogden Stewart, based on the story by Mildred Cram and Leo McCarey. The music score was by Ennio Morricone and the cinematography by Conrad L. Hall.

The film stars Beatty, Annette Bening and Katharine Hepburn in her final film role, with Garry Shandling, Chloe Webb, Pierce Brosnan, Kate Capshaw, Paul Mazursky and Brenda Vaccaro.

== Plot ==
On a flight to Sydney, sports announcer and former football star Mike Gambril meets singer Terry McKay, each of them engaged. Their plane malfunctions and is forced to make an emergency descent, during which Mike and Terry comfort each other. The plane manages an emergency landing on a remote atoll, and the passengers wait to be rescued by nearby ships.

As Mike gets himself accustomed to the boat he selected, a Russian cruise boat, Terry arrives aboard as well as her ship was being redirected elsewhere. As the passengers get more and more drunk with the Russian crew, Mike and Terry almost have an encounter but it is curtailed by party revelers. She reconsiders and runs to her room.

The next day, with a hangover, Terry says she doesn't want to make a "mess" of her life with an affair and tries to push Mike off the topic. Instead, Mike invites Terry to visit his elderly aunt, Ginny on the isle of Moorea during a routine stopover. During the visit, Terry sees a different side of Mike as they have lunch with his aunt and play music together. The romantic setting kindles their romance and, instead of taking a more convenient jet back to their respective destinations, they continue their romance on the boat for a few more days.

Finally, on the way home on the return flight to New York, they agree to reunite at the top of the Empire State Building in three months' time to test their convictions and current relationships. Terry breaks up with her fiancé Ken Allen, as does Mike with his fiancée, Lynn Weaver.

Terry finds work as a singer, mostly in advertisements. Mike, to the chagrin of his agent, is having an existential crisis about his TV career and ruminates about returning to his hobby painting. He quits his job in TV and works as the head coach at a small college. One of his primary pieces is a portrait of Terry in prayer from their idyllic day on the island, wearing his aunt's hand-made shawl.

Months later, on the way to the rendezvous, Terry is struck down by a car while crossing a street jaywalking. Gravely injured, she is rushed to the hospital. Mike, waiting for her at the observation deck at the top of the building, is unaware of the accident. After many hours, in the rain, he finally concedes at midnight that she has rejected him.

Now unable to walk as a paraplegic, Terry refuses to contact Mike and let him see her in her paralyzed condition. Instead, she finds a job as a music teacher in a small elementary school. Six months after the accident, she sees Mike with his former fiancée at a holiday concert featuring Ray Charles, which Terry is attending with her former boyfriend, Ken. Mike does not notice her condition because she is seated. Each can only manage a terse hello, with Mike looking irritated.

Christmas Eve arrives and Mike makes a surprise visit, claiming to have come across her address while looking up another name in a telephone directory. Although he steers the conversation to make her explain her actions, Terry merely dodges the subject, never leaving the couch on which she rests. Mike mentions his aunt, now deceased, had left the shawl for her in her will. His aunt had taken a liking to Terry and secretly hoped the two would marry and straighten out Mike's life. Mike mentions, that he "made a painting of you with that shawl." Mike had left it in disgust at the hotel previously and the hotel manager had the restaurant display it.

About to leave her life for good, Mike remarks that the painting was given to a woman recently who very much admired it. He is about to point out that the woman was in a wheelchair when he suddenly pauses, realizing that Terry isn't moving in her couch and making no effort to get up to say goodbye. Mike walks into Terry's bedroom, opens the door and sees his painting hanging on the wall. He now knows why she did not keep their appointment.

== Cast ==
- Warren Beatty as Mike Gambril
- Annette Bening as Terry McKay
- Katharine Hepburn as Ginny
- Garry Shandling as Kip DeMay
- Chloe Webb as Tina Wilson
- Pierce Brosnan as Ken Allen
- Kate Capshaw as Lynn Weaver
- Paul Mazursky as Herb Stillman
- Brenda Vaccaro as Nora Stillman
- Glenn Shadix as Anthony Rotundo
- Barry Miller as Robert Crosley
- Harold Ramis as Sheldon Blumenthal
- Ray Charles as Himself
- Carey Lowell as Martha
- Linda Wallem as Lorraine
- Cylk Cozart as Dr. Punch
- Meagen Fay as SSA Flight Attendant
- Ray Girardin as Wally Tripp
- John Hostetter as Ben
- Elya Baskin as Ship Captain
- Savely Kramarov as Cable Officer
- Oleg Vidov as Russian Businessman
- Herman Sinitzyn as Russian Waiter
- Taylor Dayne as Marissa

== Background and production ==
In August 1993, it was reported that Warren Beatty would produce and star alongside his wife Annette Bening in Love Affair, a remake of the 1939 film Love Affair with Charles Boyer and Irene Dunne and of the 1957 film An Affair to Remember with Cary Grant and Deborah Kerr, both directed by Leo McCarey. When questioned why he chose to remake Love Affair, Beatty stated:

There are certain stories that have a universal theme and you can do it again. My theory is to be very respectful of the material. It’s the basic yarn that holds up.

The name of Terry McKay's character remained the same in all three films, while a different one was chosen for each of the three leading men.

Love Affair was Hepburn's first big-screen appearance in nearly 10 years (although she had made several TV movies in this time) and marked her last appearance in cinema. It includes the only time that she ever said the word "fuck" on-screen. Beatty personally lobbied 86-year-old Hepburn to appear in the film. He rented a house for her in Los Angeles and had her referred to a special dermatologist, but she did not give a definitive answer until the day of filming. Luise Rainer was also considered for the role.

Filming took place in New York City, Los Angeles and on the islands of Tahiti and Moorea in French Polynesia.

== Reception ==
The remake was neither a critical nor a commercial success at the box office. It grossed $18 million domestically over a budget of $60 million and holds a 28% rating on Rotten Tomatoes from 29 reviews. Audiences surveyed by CinemaScore gave the film a grade "B+" on scale of A to F. The film was nominated for one Razzie Award, Worst Remake or Sequel.

== Year-end lists ==
- 7th worst – Peter Travers, Rolling Stone
- 7th worst – Janet Maslin, The New York Times
- Worst (not ranked) – Bob Ross, The Tampa Tribune

== See also ==
- An Affair to Remember, a sequel to the 1939 film both directed by Leo McCarey
