= Grace Quigley =

- Theatrical poster
- Directed by: Anthony Harvey
- Written by: A. Martin Zweiback
- Produced by: Yoram Globus; Menahem Golan
- Starring: Katharine Hepburn; Nick Nolte; Elizabeth Wilson; Chip Zien; Kit Le Fever
- Cinematography: Larry Pizer
- Edited by: Robert Reitano
- Music by: John Addison
- Production companies: The Cannon Group, Inc. Golan-Globus Productions
- Distributed by: The Cannon Group, Inc.
- Release date: May 17, 1985
- Running time: 102 minutes (premiere); 87 minutes (theatrical); 94 minutes (revised cut)
- Country: United States
- Language: English
- Budget: $5 million

Grace Quigley (also titled The Ultimate Solution of Grace Quigley) is a 1985 American black comedy film starring Katharine Hepburn and Nick Nolte, produced by Yoram Globus and Menahem Golan and directed by Anthony Harvey. The film is noted for being Hepburn's last leading role in a film for the big screen, as well as the last appearance, stage or otherwise, of Walter Abel.

The film is primarily set in New York City. An elderly widow is suicidal, but survives repeated suicide attempts. She hires a contract killer to end her life, and also asks him to kill other lonely old people. She views these acts as mercy killings, not murders.

== Plot ==
The plot centers on Grace, an elderly widow who lives alone in a dreary New York City apartment. She has twice survived her own suicide attempts, so she decides to hire Seymour, a hit man, to kill her and then do in others like her who are old, alone and tired of living. To her way of thinking, this professional killer will be committing acts of mercy, not murder.

== Cast ==
- Katharine Hepburn as Grace Quigley
- Nick Nolte as Seymour Flint
- Kit Le Fever as Muriel
- Chip Zien as Dr. Herman
- William Duell as Mr. Jenkins
- Elizabeth Wilson as Emily Watkins
- Walter Abel as Homer Morrison

== Versions ==
In addition to the version of the film originally released in 1985, two other versions are known to exist: the original cut, which premiered at the 1984 Cannes Film Festival running 102 minutes; and the alternate and re-edited version titled The Ultimate Solution of Grace Quigley, assembled by screenwriter A. Martin Zweiback, running 94 minutes. The latter version is considered superior by some critics.
