= The Man Upstairs (1992 film) =

- VHS cover
- Genre: Comedy drama; Crime
- Written by: James Prideaux
- Directed by: George Schaefer
- Starring: Katharine Hepburn; Ryan O'Neal
- Music by: Billy Goldenberg
- Country of origin: United States
- Original language: English

Production
- Executive producer: Burt Reynolds
- Producers: Renée Valente; James Prideaux; George Schaefer
- Production locations: Vancouver, Canada
- Cinematography: Walter Lassally
- Editor: Dann Cahn
- Running time: 91 minutes
- Production company: Burt Reynolds Productions

Original release
- Network: CBS
- Release: December 6, 1992

The Man Upstairs is a 1992 American crime comedy drama television film directed by George Schaefer and starring Katharine Hepburn and Ryan O'Neal. The film premiered on CBS on December 6, 1992.

Hepburn was nominated for a Golden Globe Award for Best Actress – Miniseries or Television Film at the 50th Golden Globe Awards.

== Plot ==
An elderly woman named Victoria Brown discovers an escaped convict, Mooney Polaski, hiding in her attic. At first she is horrified, but gradually she becomes fascinated by the fast-talking fugitive and permits him to stay in her house while the local sheriff and his men hunt for him. A relationship develops between the unlikely pair: he finds the home he never had and she overcomes her loneliness.

== Cast ==
- Katharine Hepburn - Victoria Brown
- Ryan O'Neal - Mooney Polaski
- Henry Beckman - Sheriff
- Helena Carroll - Molly
- Brenda Forbes - Cloris
- Florence Paterson - Mrs. Porter
- Sam Malkin - Store Owner
- Tom McBeath - Priest
- Lawrence King - Roy
- Robert Wisden - Mayor
- Kelli Fox - Suzy
- James Bell - Bull
- Kevin Conway - Andy
- Brent Stait - Mort
- Kevin McNulty - Interrogator
- Roark Critchlow - Boy Scout Leader
- Teryl Rothery - Female Newscaster
- Linden Soles - Male Newscaster
