= One Christmas =

- Genre: Drama
- Based on: "One Christmas" by Truman Capote
- Teleplay by: Duane Poole
- Directed by: Tony Bill
- Starring: Katharine Hepburn; Henry Winkler; Swoosie Kurtz
- Music by: Van Dyke Parks
- Country of origin: United States
- Original language: English

Production
- Executive producers: John Philip Dayton; Merrill H. Karpf
- Producers: John Davis; Duane Poole
- Cinematography: Thomas Del Ruth
- Editor: Duane Hartzell
- Running time: 86 minutes
- Production company: Karpf-Davis Entertainment Television

Original release
- Network: NBC
- Release: December 19, 1994

One Christmas is a 1994 American drama television film directed by Tony Bill, written by Duane Poole, and starring Katharine Hepburn (in her final television role), Henry Winkler and Swoosie Kurtz. It is based on the 1983 short story "One Christmas" by Truman Capote about a young boy who reluctantly leaves his Alabama home to spend Christmas with his estranged father in New Orleans. The film originally premiered on NBC on December 19, 1994.

== Plot ==
In 1930, eight-year-old Buddy lives an idyllic existence in rural Alabama with his cousin Sook. But all that is about to change when he is sent to New Orleans to spend Christmas with his estranged father, a con artist more intent on scamming than building a relationship with his son. Although his dad has terrible problems to overcome and is busy pursuing the niece of wealthy Cornelia Beaumont, Buddy and his father take the first steps towards becoming a real family during this one Christmas they will never forget.

== Cast ==
- Katharine Hepburn as Cornelia Beaumont
- Henry Winkler as Dad
- Swoosie Kurtz as Emily
- T.J. Lowther as Buddy
- Tonea Stewart as Evangeline
- Joe Maggard as Dixon Hobbs
- Julie Harris as Sook

== Award nomination ==
Hepburn was nominated for a Screen Actors Guild Award in 1995 for Outstanding Performance by a Female Actor in a Miniseries or Television Movie.

== See also ==
- List of Christmas films
