= Morning Glory (1933 film) =

1933 film by Lowell Sherman

- Original US cinema poster
- Directed by: Lowell Sherman
- Screenplay by: Howard J. Green
- Based on: Morning Glory; 1939 play by Zoë Akins
- Produced by: Pandro S. Berman
- Starring: Katharine Hepburn; Douglas Fairbanks Jr. Adolphe Menjou
- Cinematography: Bert Glennon
- Edited by: William Hamilton
- Music by: Max Steiner
- Production company: RKO Radio Pictures
- Distributed by: RKO Radio Pictures (US)
- Release date: August 18, 1933 (US)
- Running time: 70 minutes
- Country: United States
- Language: English
- Budget: $239,000
- Box office: $582,000

Morning Glory is a 1933 American pre-Code drama film which tells the story of an excited would-be actress and her journey to stardom. As well as, her gains and losses. The picture stars Katharine Hepburn, Douglas Fairbanks Jr., and Adolphe Menjou, was adapted by Howard J. Green from a then-unproduced stage play of the same name by Zoë Akins, and was directed by Lowell Sherman. Hepburn won her first Academy Award for Best Actress. Morning Glory was remade in 1958 under the title Stage Struck.

== Plot ==
Eva Lovelace is an aspiring performer from a small town who dreams of making it big on Broadway. Despite attending numerous auditions, she hasn't been given an opportunity yet. At the management office of the Easton Theatre, star actress Rita Vernon, known for her diva behavior, negotiates a deal with the theater owner and producer, Louis Easton. Rita accepts a small role in an upcoming play in exchange for her pick of roles in the next production. While in Easton's waiting room, Eva impresses Robert Hedges, an experienced actor, who agrees to help her. Playwright Joseph Sheridan is also captivated by Eva's vibrant personality.

Months pass, and Eva struggles to find significant roles while moving frequently due to financial difficulties. Hedges eventually finds Eva in a desperate situation and takes her to a celebrity party at Easton's apartment. Inebriated after drinking on an empty stomach, Eva makes a scene but surprises everyone by delivering powerful Shakespearean monologues. She passes out and is put to bed by Easton's butler. The next morning, Easton, feeling guilty for taking advantage of Eva's innocence, confides in Sheridan and asks for his help in getting rid of her. Sheridan, who has fallen in love with Eva, decides not to reveal the truth to her, causing her to leave with the belief that her night with Easton marks the start of a committed relationship.

Months go by, and Eva repeatedly tries to see Easton, who ignores her. Sheridan keeps his feelings hidden as well. Easton's theater company prepares to showcase Sheridan's new play, with Rita as the star. On opening night, Rita demands a written contract with a huge salary increase and half the profits from the play. Feeling cornered, Easton considers complying, but Sheridan suggests bringing in Eva – who is in the cast and knows Rita's part – as a surprise understudy instead. Reluctantly, Easton agrees, leading to Rita storming off the set.

In Rita's dressing room, Eva and Sheridan find themselves together. Overwhelmed by the sudden opportunity, Eva is filled with doubt and fear. She feels unable to perform in front of Easton, and questions her own talents and inevitable failure. Sheridan reassures her, reminding her of her strength, beauty, and natural acting abilities. Encouraged by his words, Eva regains her confidence and decides to embrace the role.

As predicted by Sheridan, Eva's performance is a resounding success. Backstage, Easton reconciles with Eva, offering her his professional friendship and support but not his love. After Easton leaves, Sheridan musters the courage to confess his love for Eva, but she remains silent, leaving their relationship uncertain. Left alone with her dresser – a former star who Hedges explains was a "morning glory . . . a flower that fades before the sun is very high" – Eva is comforted and reminded that true love is the most important thing in life, as her dresser admits once making the mistake of choosing fame over love.

Renewed and ready to face the challenges ahead, Eva prepares herself for the rocky road to stardom. The film ends on an optimistic note, with Eva confidently declaring to her dresser that she is unafraid to be "just a morning glory."

== Cast ==
- Katharine Hepburn as Eva Lovelace
- Douglas Fairbanks Jr. as Joseph Sheridan
- Adolphe Menjou as Louis Easton
- Mary Duncan as Rita Vernon
- C. Aubrey Smith as Robert Harley "Bob" Hedges
- Don Alvarado as Pepi Velez
- Fredric Santley as Will Seymour, Easton's assistant
- Richard Carle as Henry Lawrence, theatrical critic
- Tyler Brooke as Charley Van Duesen
- Geneva Mitchell as Gwendoline Hall
- Helen Ware as Nellie Navarre, dresser (wardrobe woman) and herself a former star

== Production ==
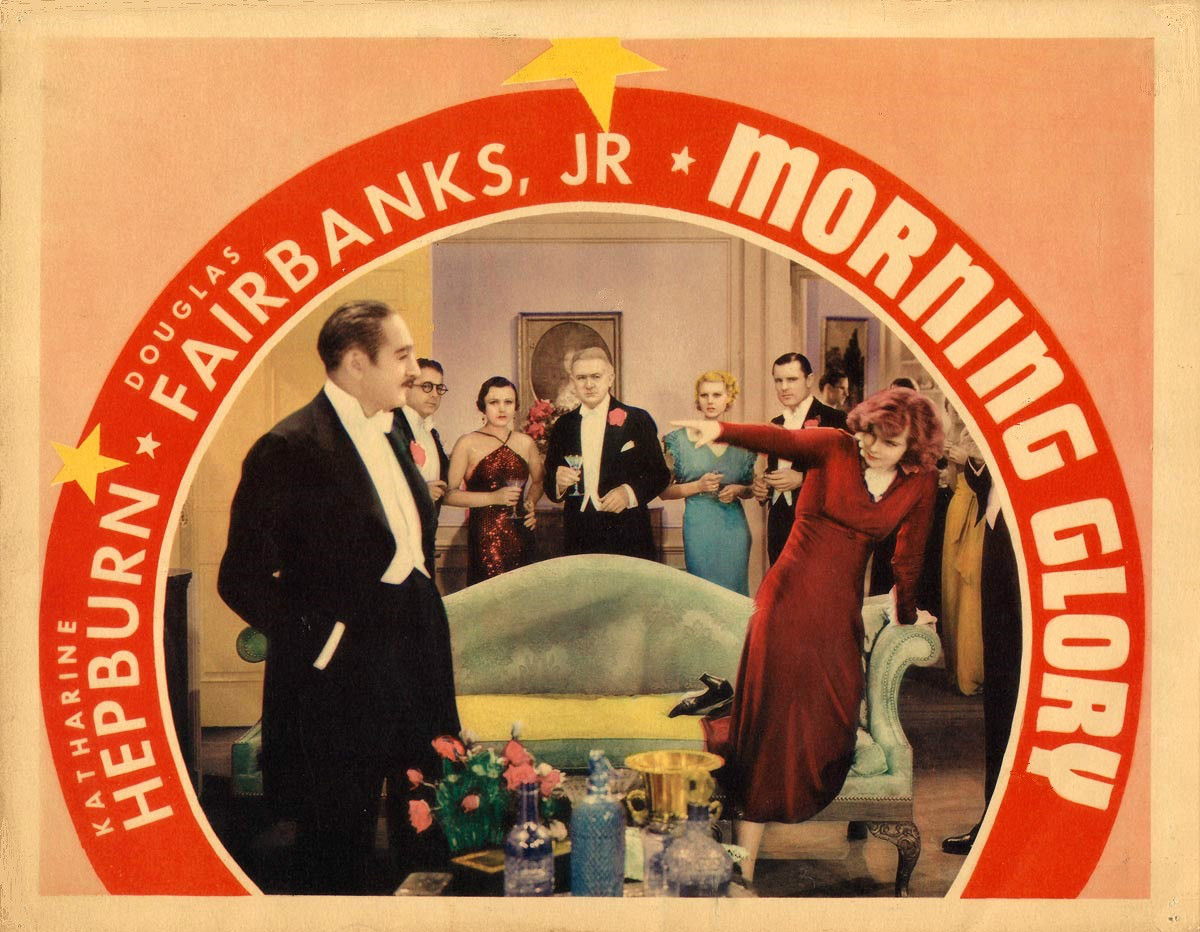
Lobby card

In pre-production, the script had been tailored to fit the talents of Constance Bennett, then RKO's biggest attraction. However, when newcomer Katharine Hepburn read the script, she convinced producer Pandro S. Berman that she was born to play the part, and she was given the role over the more popular Bennett, who was thereupon reassigned to Bed of Roses (1933).

When RKO bought the rights to the play from Zoë Akins, it still hadn't been produced on stage. It eventually saw a limited stage run in 1939. The director Lowell Sherman managed to get the RKO bosses to agree that he was given a week of rehearsal with the actors before the shooting began, in return for promising a shooting schedule of only 18 days (April 21 - May 12, 1933). Unlike most feature films, Morning Glory was shot in the same sequence as the script. Katharine Hepburn was paid $2,500 per week for her work on the picture, for which she eventually won her first Academy Award for Best Actress.

== Box office ==
After cinema circuits deducted their exhibition share of box office tickets, this film earned a profit of $115,000.

== Radio adaptations ==
On September 19, 1938 Lux Radio Theatre broadcast a one-hour radio adaptation of the film, starring Barbara Stanwyck, Melvyn Douglas and Ralph Bellamy. On October 12, 1942 a second Lux Radio Theatre adaptation was aired, this time starring Judy Garland as Eva Lovelace, with Adolphe Menjou reprising his role of Louis Easton. Garland performed the song "I'll Remember April" on the broadcast.

On April 7, 1949 a half-hour radio adaptation was aired on Hallmark Playhouse with Elizabeth Taylor in the lead role of Eva Lovelace.
