= Mrs. Delafield Wants to Marry =

1986 American television film

- Genre: Comedy; Drama; Romance
- Written by: James Prideaux
- Directed by: George Schaefer
- Starring: Katharine Hepburn; Harold Gould
- Music by: Peter Matz
- Country of origin: United States
- Original language: English

Production
- Executive producer: Merrill H. Karpf
- Producers: George Schaefer; James Prideaux
- Production location: Vancouver
- Cinematography: Walter Lassally
- Editor: Andy Blumenthal
- Running time: 95 minutes
- Production companies: Schaefer/Karpf Productions; Gaylord Productions

Original release
- Network: CBS
- Release: March 30, 1986

Mrs. Delafield Wants to Marry is a 1986 American made-for-television romantic comedy film directed by George Schaefer and starring Katharine Hepburn and Harold Gould which premiered on CBS on Easter Sunday, March 30, 1986. It tells the story of a widow who shocks her upper-class, Anglo-American family when she announces that she has fallen in love with her Jewish doctor. His family is equally unhappy with the news, and both individuals have to fight the prejudices of their families.

== Plot ==
Margaret Delafield, a rich elderly lady and widow of Spaulding 'Spud' Delafield (an unseen character), is rushed to hospital. She is not expected to survive, and her two sons and daughter gathering at her bedside are more concerned with their expected inheritance. Her doctor, Dr Marvin Elias, encourages her to fight. Margaret makes a full recovery and returns home to a welcome party for family and friends.

Her sons Horton and Chipper and daughter Doreen are concerned that Margaret and Marvin seem to be spending more time together than might be expected for a doctor/patient relationship. They are devastated when Margaret and Marvin announce their impending wedding, and see their inheritance slipping away. They try to persuade her to change her mind, and Marvin's children are equally doubtful.

Margaret's favourite church refuses to perform a mixed marriage (Marvin is Jewish) and Marvin's rabbi is equally unwilling. They decide on a small country church and invite all family and friends.

The wedding is a mixture of Jewish and Christian symbolism, with a monastic chorus, harp music and medieval minstrels. The families are reconciled and the newlyweds leave for a honeymoon in Hawaii.

The goings-on are observed by George, Margaret's neighbour and best friend, who breaks the fourth wall to comment on proceedings.

== Cast ==
- Katharine Hepburn as Margaret Delafield
- Harold Gould as Dr. Marvin Elias
- Bibi Besch as Doreen Delafield
- Denholm Elliott as George Parker
- Brenda Forbes as Gladys Parker
- Charles Frank as Chipper Delafield
- Suzanne Lederer as Shirley Elias
- John Pleshette as David Elias
- David Ogden Stiers as Horton Delafield
- Kathryn Walker as Sarah

== Award nominations ==
The film was nominated for three Primetime Emmy Awards: Outstanding Drama/Comedy Special, Outstanding Lead Actress in a Miniseries or a Special (Katharine Hepburn) and Outstanding Supporting Actor in a Miniseries or a Special (Harold Gould). George Schaefer was also nominated for Outstanding Directorial Achievement in Dramatic Specials at the Directors Guild of America Awards.
