= Love Among the Ruins (film) =

1975 television film by George Cukor

- DVD cover
- Genre: Comedy; Drama; Romance
- Written by: James Costigan
- Directed by: George Cukor
- Starring: Katharine Hepburn; Laurence Olivier
- Music by: John Barry
- Country of origin: United States
- Original language: English

Production
- Producer: Allan Davis
- Production locations: St. Pancras Station, St. Pancras, London, England; Pinewood Studios, Iver Heath, Buckinghamshire, England
- Cinematography: Douglas Slocombe
- Editor: John F. Burnett
- Running time: 103 minutes
- Production company: ABC Circle Films

Original release
- Network: ABC
- Release: March 6, 1975

Love Among the Ruins is a 1975 American made-for-television romantic comedy film directed by George Cukor and starring Katharine Hepburn and Laurence Olivier that premiered on ABC on March 6, 1975.

== Plot ==
The story is set in 1911, at the end of the Edwardian period. Jessica Medlicott is an aging grande dame, formerly an actress of the London theatre, accused of having met, courted, promised marriage to, and then jilted and abandoned her suitor. The much-younger ex-fiancé then files suit, seeking £50,000 in damages for breach of promise. She retains the greatest barrister in the empire, Sir Arthur Granville-Jones, to defend her. He is incidentally also a man she seduced and abandoned 40 years earlier, but who has remained hopelessly in love with her ever since.

== Cast ==
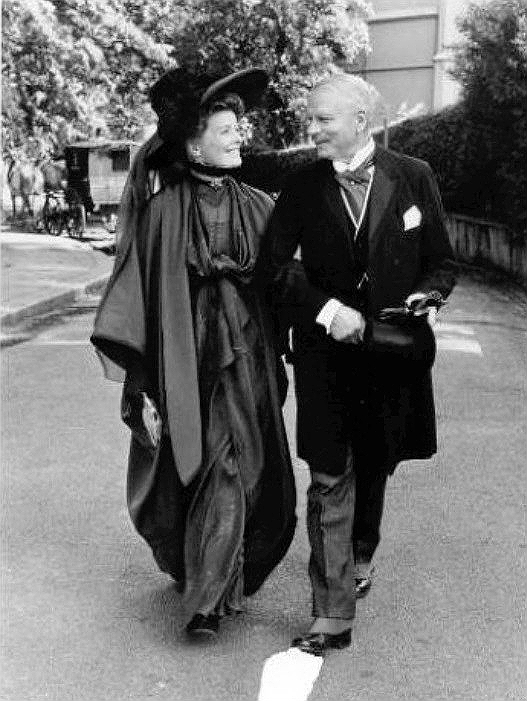
Hepburn and Olivier filming Love Among the Ruins (1975)

- Katharine Hepburn as Jessica Medlicott
- Laurence Olivier as Sir Arthur Granville-Jones
- Colin Blakely as J. F. Devine
- Richard Pearson as Druce
- Joan Sims as Fanny Pratt
- Leigh Lawson as Alfred Pratt
- Gwen Nelson as Hermione Davis
- Robert Harris as The Judge
- Peter Reeves as Maiden
- John Blythe as Tipstaff
- Arthur Hewlett as The Usher
- John Dunbar as Clerk of the Court
- Iain Sinclair as Pratt's Solicitor
- Mervyn Pascoe as 1st Barrister
- Colin Thomas as 2nd Barrister
- Lincoln Wright as 3rd Barrister
- Edward Arthur as 4th Barrister
- John Bromley as 5th Barrister
- Leslie Southwick as 6th Barrister
- Stanley Platts as Foreman of the Jury
- Philip Lennard as 1st Reporter
- Peter Lund as 2nd Reporter
- Frank Forsyth as Jessop
- John G. Heller as Head Waiter
- Rosamond Burne as 1st Woman Spectator
- Coral Fairweather as 2nd Woman Spectator
- Jacqueline Clarke as Miss Pratt
- T. C. Hogan as Teplow

== Score ==
The leitmotif for composer John Barry’s score is Schubert’s Waltz No. 1, Opus 9. The music serves to embellish the mise-en-scene in both its comedic and dramatic sequences.

== Awards and nominations ==
Year	Award	Category	Name	Result
1975	Peabody Award	Area of Excellence - ABC Theatre	Love Among the Ruins	Won
1975	Primetime Emmy Award	Outstanding Special - Drama or Comedy	Love Among the Ruins	Nominated
1975	Primetime Emmy Award	Outstanding Directing in a Special Program - Drama or Comedy	George Cukor	Won
1975	Primetime Emmy Award	Outstanding Lead Actress in a Special Program - Drama or Comedy	Katharine Hepburn	Won
1975	Primetime Emmy Award	Outstanding Lead Actor in a Special Program - Drama or Comedy	Laurence Olivier	Won
1975	Primetime Emmy Award	Outstanding Writing in a Special Program - Drama or Comedy - Original Teleplay	James Costigan	Won
1975	Primetime Emmy Award	Outstanding Achievement in Costume Design	Margaret Furse	Won
1975	Primetime Emmy Award	Outstanding Achievement in Art Direction or Scenic Design	Carmen Dillon (art director)	Won
1975	Primetime Emmy Award	Outstanding Achievement in Art Direction or Scenic Design	Tessa Davies (set decorator)	Won

== See also ==
- List of British films of 1975

== Sources ==
- McBride, Joseph. 2025. George Cukor’s People. Columbia University Press, New York. ISBN 978-0-231-21082-9
