= Happy New Year (musical) =

Musical by Cole Porter

- Music: Cole Porter
- Lyrics: Cole Porter
- Book: Burt Shevelove
- Basis: Holiday by Philip Barry
- Productions: 1980 Broadway

Happy New Year is a musical with a book by Burt Shevelove and music and lyrics by Cole Porter.

Based on Philip Barry's comic 1928 play Holiday and its subsequent 1930 film adaptation and better known 1938 remake, it focuses on hedonistic young Wall Street attorney Johnny Case who, driven by his passion to live life as a holiday, contemplates abandoning his career for a carefree existence by marrying wealthy upper class Julia Seton.

== History ==
Porter successfully had transformed Barry's 1939 play The Philadelphia Story into the 1956 musical film High Society, so Shevelove pored through the composer's catalogue in search of tunes that would fit Holiday's plot. When the show previewed at the Stratford Festival in Canada, the score consisted of lesser-known Porter songs, and Shevelove decided to eliminate most of them in favor of music more familiar to audiences. He also opted to replace much of Barry's original repartee with songs that suited neither the characters nor the situations, and replaced the gaps with a narrator whose purpose was to explain what was missing from the plot, a device that ultimately proved to be clumsy and confusing.

== Synopsis ==
The Narrator introduces the Seton family, who in December 1933 live in a five-story townhouse on Fifth Avenue in New York City. He relates their story.

Successful Wall Street lawyer Johnny Case has become engaged to Julia Seton. Julia and her sister Linda celebrate the engagement ("At Long Last Love"). However, Johnny has decided to abandon his well-paid career and instead live a life of pleasure, using Julia's money. Julia's banker father Edward is very upset and her willful sister Linda is fascinated. Johnny begins to realize that he loves the unconventional Linda, and they become a couple, disregarding the "old money and values" of others for a life together.

== Song list ==
Act I

- "At Long Last Love" – Julia, Linda and Ned
- "Ridin' High" † – Johnny and Julia
- "Let's Be Buddies" †† – Johnny and Linda
- "Boy, Oh, Boy" – Linda
- "You'd Be So Easy to Love" – The Young Men
- "You Do Something to Me" – Johnny
- "Red, Hot and Blue" † – Linda, Johnny, Patrick, and The Stork Club Set
- "Once Upon a Time" ††† – Ned and Linda

Act II

- "Night and Day" – The Narrator and Johnny
- "Let's Make It a Night" †††† – Linda, Thompson and Dixon
- "Ours" † – Julia
- "After You, Who?" – Johnny
- "I Am Loved" ††††† – Julia
- "When Your Troubles Have Started" † – Linda and Ned

† from Red, Hot and Blue
†† from Panama Hattie
††† from Ever Yours (1933-1934, never produced)
†††† written for Silk Stockings, but not used
††††† from Out of This World

== Productions ==
The Broadway production opened at the Morosco Theatre on April 27, 1980 and closed on May 10, 1980, after 17 performances and 27 previews. Directed by Shevelove and choreographed by Donald Saddler, the cast included Michael Scott as Johnny, Kimberly Farr as Julia, William Roerick as Edward, and Leslie Denniston as Linda, with John McMartin as the narrator and Richard Bekins and Lara Teeter and Tim Flavin in supporting roles.

== Response ==
Mel Gussow (The New York Times) wrote that the musical "turns out to be a musical bouquet of gentle charm and piquancy." He noted that the tryout at the Stratford (Ontario) Festival during the summer of 1979 "seemed like a good idea gone awry." Since that time, more than half the songs were replaced, the entire cast was replaced, and there was "considerable rewriting."

John Simon (The New York Magazine) called the musical a "hodgepodge" and advised: "Avoid...like the ho-hum bag of tricks it is, the other new (?) musical, Happy New Year."

Denniston won the Theatre World Award for her performance, and Pierre Balmain was nominated for the Tony Award for Best Costume Design and won the Drama Desk Award for Outstanding Costume Design.
