= Mary Astor filmography =

List of films featuring American actress Mary Astor

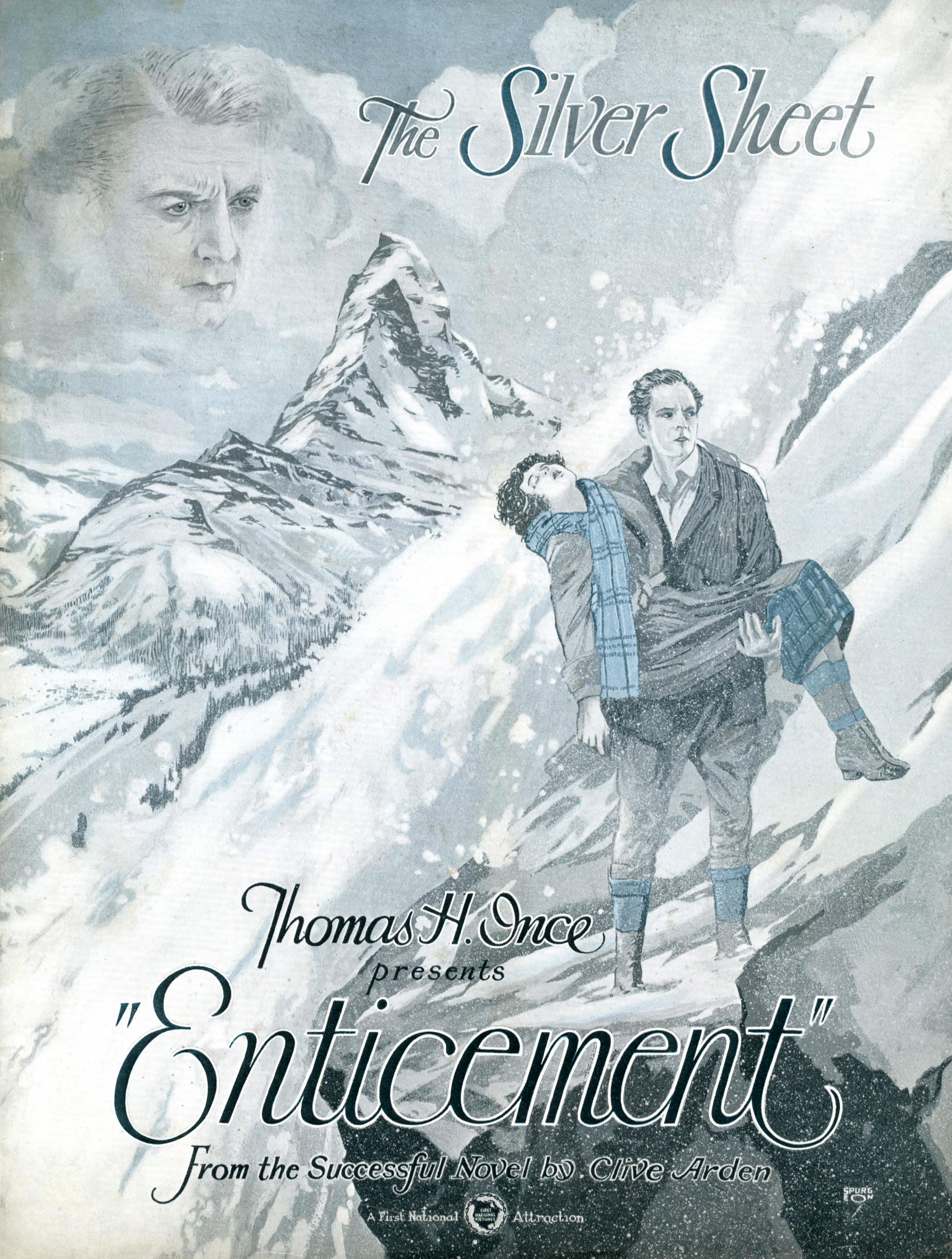
Front-cover poster for the 1925 film Enticement, featured in this issue of the Ince Studios periodical

Filmography for the actress Mary Astor:

== Silent films: 1920–1929 ==
Year	Film	Role	Notes
1921	Sentimental Tommy	Bit part	Lost film Scenes deleted
1921	My Lady o' the Pines	Norah Collison	Short subject
1921	Brother of the Bear	Marcia Harthorn	Short subject Uncredited role
1921	The Beggar Maid	Peasant Girl / Beggar Maid	Short subject Uncredited role
1921	Wings of the Border	Bit part	Uncredited role
1921	Bullets or Ballots	Bit part	Uncredited role
1921	The Bashful Suitor	Bit part	Uncredited role
1922	The Young Painter	Helen Seymour	Short subject Lost film
1922	John Smith	Irene Mason	Lost film
1922	Hope	Hope	Short subject
1922	The Man Who Played God	Young Woman	
1922	The Rapids	Elsie Worden	Lost film
1922	The Angelus	Bit part	Uncredited role
1922	One Exciting Night	Young mother who dies in Africa	Uncredited Bit role; (unconfirmed)
1923	Second Fiddle	Polly Crawford	
1923	Success	Rose Randolph	Lost film
1923	The Bright Shawl	Narcissa Escobar	
1923	Hollywood	Herself	cameo Lost film
1923	Puritan Passions	Rachel	Lost film
1923	The Marriage Maker	Vivian Hope-Clarke	Lost film
1923	Woman-Proof	Violet Lynwood	Lost film
1923	To the Ladies	Bit part	Uncredited role Lost film
1924	The Fighting Coward	Lucy	
1924	Beau Brummel	Lady Margery Alvanley	
1924	The Fighting American	Mary O'Mallory	
1924	Unguarded Women	Helen Castle	Lost film
1924	The Price of a Party	Alice Barrows	Incomplete film
1924	Inez from Hollywood	Fay Bartholdi	Lost film
1925	Oh Doctor!	Dolores Hicks	
1925	Enticement	Leonore Bewlay	Lost film
1925	Playing with Souls	Margo	Lost film
1925	Don Q, Son of Zorro	Dolores de Muro	
1925	The Pace That Thrills	Doris	Lost film
1925	Scarlet Saint	Fidele Tridon	Lost film
1926	High Steppers	Audrey Nye	Lost film
1926	The Wise Guy	Mary	
1926	Don Juan	Adriana della Varnese	
1926	Forever After	Jennie Clayton	
1927	The Sea Tiger	Amy Cortissos	Lost film
1927	The Sunset Derby	Molly Gibson	Lost film
1927	Two Arabian Knights	Mirza	
1927	Rose of the Golden West	Elena	
1927	The Rough Riders	Dolly	Incomplete film
1927	No Place to Go	Sally Montgomery	Incomplete BFI Institute, one reel missing
1928	Sailors' Wives	Carol Trent	Lost film
1928	Dressed to Kill	Jean MacDonald	
1928	Three-Ring Marriage	Anna	Lost film
1928	Heart to Heart	Princess Delatorre / Ellen Guthrie	
1928	Dry Martini	Elizabeth Quimby	Lost film
1928	Romance of the Underworld	Judith Andrews	
1929	New Year's Eve	Marjorie Ware	Lost film
1929	The Woman from Hell	Dee Renaud	Lost film

== Sound films: 1929–1964 ==
Year	Film	Role	Notes
1929	The Show of Shows	Performer in 'The Pirate' Number	
1930	The Runaway Bride	Mary Gray, AKA Sally Fairchild	
1930	Ladies Love Brutes	Mimi Howell	
1930	Holiday	Julia Seton	
1930	The Lash	Rosita Garcia	
1931	The Royal Bed	Princess Anne	
1931	Other Men's Women	Lily Kulper	
1931	Behind Office Doors	Mary Linden	
1931	The Sin Ship	Frisco Kitty	
1931	White Shoulders	Norma Selbee	Lost film
1931	Smart Woman	Mrs. Nancy Gibson	
1931	Men of Chance	Martha Silk	
1932	The Lost Squadron	Follette Marsh	
1932	Those We Love	May Ballard	
1932	A Successful Calamity	Emmy 'Sweetie' Wilton	
1932	Red Dust	Barbara Willis	
1933	The Little Giant	Ruth Wayburn	
1933	Jennie Gerhardt	Letty Pace	
1933	The Kennel Murder Case	Hilda Lake	
1933	The World Changes	Virginia 'Ginny' Clafflin Nordholm	
1933	Convention City	Arlene Dale	Lost film
1934	Easy to Love	Charlotte Hopkins	
1934	Upperworld	Mrs. Hettie Stream	
1934	Return of the Terror	Olga Morgan	
1934	The Man with Two Faces	Jessica Wells	
1934	The Case of the Howling Dog	Bessie Foley	
1934	I Am a Thief	Odette Mauclair	
1935	Red Hot Tires	Patricia Sanford	
1935	Straight from the Heart	Marian Henshaw	
1935	Dinky	Mrs. Martha Daniels	
1935	Page Miss Glory	Gladys Russell	
1935	Man of Iron	Vida	
1936	The Murder of Dr. Harrigan	Lillian Cooper	
1936	And So They Were Married	Edith Farnham	
1936	Trapped by Television	Barbara 'Bobby' Blake	
1936	Dodsworth	Mrs. Edith Cortright	
1936	Lady from Nowhere	Polly Dunlap	
1937	The Prisoner of Zenda	Antoinette de Mauban	
1937	The Hurricane	Madame Germaine De Laage	
1938	No Time to Marry	Kay McGowan	
1938	Paradise for Three	Mrs. Irene Mallebre	
1938	There's Always a Woman	Lola Fraser	
1938	Woman Against Woman	Cynthia Holland	
1938	Listen, Darling	Mrs. Dorothy 'Dottie' Wingate	
1939	Midnight	Helene Flammarion	
1940	Turnabout	Marion Manning	
1940	Brigham Young	Mary Ann Young	
1941	The Great Lie	Sandra Kovak	Academy Award for Best Supporting Actress
1941	The Maltese Falcon	Brigid O'Shaughnessy	
1942	The Palm Beach Story	The Princess Centimillia	
1942	Across the Pacific	Alberta Marlow	
1943	Young Ideas	Josephine 'Jo' Evans	
1943	Thousands Cheer	Hyllary Jones	
1944	Meet Me in St. Louis	Mrs. Anna Smith	
1944	Blonde Fever	Delilah Donay	
1946	Claudia and David	Elizabeth Van Doren	
1947	Fiesta	Señora Morales	
1947	Desert Fury	Fritzi Haller	
1947	Cynthia	Louise Bishop	
1947	Cass Timberlane	Queenie Havock	
1949	Act of Violence	Pat	
1949	Little Women	Mrs. March / 'Marmee'	
1949	Any Number Can Play	Ada	
1953	Yesterday and Today		Silent film compilation (archive footage only)
1956	A Kiss Before Dying	Mrs. Corliss	
1956	The Power and the Prize	Mrs. George Salt	
1957	The Devil's Hairpin	Mrs. Jargin	
1958	This Happy Feeling	Mrs. Tremaine	
1959	Stranger in My Arms	Virgily Beasley	
1961	Return to Peyton Place	Mrs. Roberta Carter	
1961	Rawhide	Emma Cardwell	S3:E13, "Incident of the Promised Land"
1964	Youngblood Hawke	Irene Perry	
1964	Hush...Hush, Sweet Charlotte	Mrs. Jewel Mayhew	

== Selected television appearances ==
- Alfred Hitchcock Presents (1958) (Season 4 Episode 12: "Mrs. Herman and Mrs. Fenimore") as Mrs. Fenimore
- Alfred Hitchcock Presents (1959) (Season 4 Episode 28: "The Impossible Dream") as Grace Dolan
