= Without Love (film) =

1945 film by Harold S. Bucquet

- Theatrical release poster
- Directed by: Harold S. Bucquet
- Screenplay by: Donald Ogden Stewart
- Based on: Without Love; 1942 play by Philip Barry
- Produced by: Lawrence Weingarten
- Starring: Spencer Tracy; Katharine Hepburn; Lucille Ball; Keenan Wynn; Carl Esmond; Patricia Morison; Felix Bressart
- Cinematography: Karl Freund
- Edited by: Frank Sullivan
- Music by: Bronislau Kaper
- Production company: Metro-Goldwyn-Mayer
- Distributed by: Loew's Inc.
- Release date: March 22, 1945 (New York City)
- Running time: 111 minutes
- Country: United States
- Language: English
- Budget: $1,813,000
- Box office: $3,784,000

Without Love is a 1945 romantic comedy film directed by Harold S. Bucquet and starring Spencer Tracy, Katharine Hepburn, and Lucille Ball. Based on a 1942 play by Philip Barry, the film's screenplay was written by Donald Ogden Stewart.

== Plot ==
Lonely widow Jamie Rowan helps the war effort by marrying a military research scientist, Patrick Jamieson, who has set up his lab in her house in Washington, D.C. Patrick has had all the worst of love, and Jamie all the best. They both believe a marriage could be a success without love, as it reduces the chances of jealousy and bickering and all the other marital disadvantages. But as the film progresses, the inevitable happens as they begin to fall in love with each other.

== Cast ==
- Spencer Tracy as Patrick Jamieson
- Katharine Hepburn as Jamie Rowan
- Lucille Ball as Kitty Trimble
- Keenan Wynn as Quentin Ladd
- Carl Esmond as Paul Carrell
- Patricia Morison as Edwina Collins
- Felix Bressart as Professor Ginza

== Production ==
The original Philip Barry stage play debuted on Broadway at the St. James Theatre in 1942. Katharine Hepburn starred as Jamie Rowan with actor/writer/director Elliott Nugent as Patrick Jamieson, the role Spencer Tracy would take in the film. Audrey Christie played the Lucille Ball role of Kitty Trimble, and the cast included Royal Beal and Lauren Gilbert. Lucille Ball broke a toe doing a dance number during filming.

Barry wrote the part expressly for Hepburn, as he had previously done with The Philadelphia Story, a major Broadway hit for Hepburn which she turned into her 1940 comeback film, also starring Cary Grant and James Stewart, and also adapted for the screen by Donald Ogden Stewart. Hepburn and Grant's 1938 film Holiday—which had already been a 1930 film—was based on a 1929 Barry play.

Without Love was the third film to co-star Hepburn and Tracy, and it would be the last film directed by Bucquet. Lucille Ball would turn to this film's cinematographer, Karl Freund, six years later in her struggle to launch a filmed television show, unheard of at the time.

== Reception ==
In his March 23, 1945 review Bosley Crowther of The New York Times wrote: “You'd never have known it by the weather, but spring came to the Music Hall yesterday. …in the vernal atmosphere engendered by a new picture, called "Without Love." And, in case anyone has misgivings about that title's propriety in the spring, let us hasten to reassure you that you can just overlook the "without." For this is a high-class discussion of the season's most popular yen, and Spencer Tracy and Katharine Hepburn do the talking in a most winning and witty style.The talking, did we say? We said the talking—for the fact of the matter is that "Without Love" is pretty largely a linguacious exercise....one of these conversational dramas in which the action chiefly flows on nimble words, spoken with smooth and saucy savour, and in which feats of little patter abound.... And—well, if you can't guess the ending, you can go to the theatre and be surprised. Indeed, you should all go to the theatre, for, despite its gab and weaknesses in spots, "Without Love" is really most amusing. And that goes for its bright particular stars. ....You can bet that this spring a lot of fancies are going to turn lightly to "Without Love."

On December 31, 1944 Variety staff wrote: “Competent trouping and topflight production make Without Love a click. But there's no gainsaying the general obviousness of it all, along with a somewhat static plot basis (from a play by Philip Barry).

Harrison's Reports observed: “In adapting this from the Theatre Guild's stage play of the same title, the producers have altered the plot considerably; to such an extent, in fact, that the story is unrecognizable. It is, however, an amusing comedy-drama, which should prove to be a pretty good box-office attraction because of the leading players' popularity. … good performances and some bright comedy situations make it the type of entertainment that leaves an audience in a pleasant mood. …There is more talk than action, but the sparkling dialogue is a compensating factor."

Wolcott Gibbs of The New Yorker wrote that the film had been changed significantly from the play but was "a very witty and engaging picture, recommended here without hesitation. Miss Hepburn and Mr. Tracy succeed brilliantly in the leading parts."

In 2020, Filmink included it in a top 10 list of famed screen couples who made unmemorable films, calling it the least known of the Tracy-Hepburn films, "absolutely, resolutely, and incredibly unmemorable."

Without Love holds an 83% rating on Rotten Tomatoes based on 6 reviews.

According to MGM records the film earned $2,702,000 in the US and Canada and $1,082,000 elsewhere resulting in a profit of $619,000.
