= Helen Hope Montgomery Scott =

Philadelphian socialite and philanthropist

Helen Hope Montgomery Scott (April 8, 1904 – January 9, 1995) was a socialite and philanthropist who was considered the epitome of Main Line high society. (Vanity Fair labeled her "the unofficial queen of Philadelphia's WASP oligarchy.") She was a longtime chairman and executive director of the Devon Horse Show and sponsored other events to raise money for the Bryn Mawr Hospital, her favorite charity.

As a symbol of aristocratic, free-spirited elegance, Scott was the inspiration for "Tracy Lord" in Philip Barry's play The Philadelphia Story (1939) — made into the 1940 film of the same name — and for the musical film High Society (1956).

== Early life and education ==
Hope Scott was one of the four children of Colonel Robert Leaming Montgomery, who founded the investment firm known today as Janney Montgomery Scott. Her mother was Charlotte Hope Binney Tyler Montgomery, whose family had made its fortune in banking. In 1923, Helen Hope Montgomery married Edgar Scott, an investment banker and heir to a railroad fortune. After her marriage, Scott began to appear regularly on the New York Couture Group's annual list of best-dressed women. Her beauty and slim, angular figure (size eight throughout her life) was much admired, inspiring artists such as Cecil Beaton and Augustus John. Scott became famous for hosting lavish parties at Ardrossan, the Montgomerys' 750-acre (3.0 km^{2}) estate in Radnor, Pennsylvania, where she entertained notables of society, government, and the arts, including W. Averell Harriman, Cole Porter, and Katharine Hepburn. Her son, Robert Montgomery Scott was also a philanthropist, and after a long legal career served as president of the Academy of Music, and even more visibly, the Philadelphia Museum of Art.

Montgomery was initially educated by a governess, and later spent a short period at Foxcroft School, a girls' boarding school in Middleburg, Virginia. She began riding at the age of four, and horsemanship was a major interest of hers throughout her lifetime. She was officially introduced to society as a debutante at Philadelphia's Assembly Ball in 1922. One of the oldest and most exclusive social gatherings in the United States, it has been held every year since 1748 and was historically reserved for members of Philadelphia's high society.

In the late 18th century, Philadelphia was the nation's leading city and became an industrial and commercial powerhouse by the 19th century. Its upper class at the time embraced a form of the class-consciousness described by Edith Wharton in such novels as The Age of Innocence, and the term White Anglo-Saxon Protestant (WASP) is said to have been coined to describe its members by sociologist Digby Baltzell. Philadelphia society, more traditional than that of New York City or San Francisco, consciously copied the manners and pursuits of the English aristocracy with private gentlemen's clubs, leisure pursuits such as fox hunting and rowing, and the annual debutante ball, held in the ballroom of the Bellevue-Stratford Hotel.

As the beautiful daughter of an "old money" Philadelphia family, Montgomery received four marriage proposals the evening of her society debut, but did not accept any of them. The following year she met 24-year-old Edgar Scott, a grandson of Pennsylvania Railroad president Thomas A. Scott, at a Main Line dinner party. They dated only a dozen times before deciding to marry, but her parents insisted they wait nine months more. Their marriage was described as the society wedding of the year, and covered in minute detail by the press. The newlyweds moved into Orchard Lodge, a circa 1720 fieldstone house given to Scott by her father as a wedding present, which is on the Ardrossan estate in Radnor Township.

== Career ==
=== Ardrossan ===
The Pennsylvania Railroad, at one time the largest publicly traded corporation in the world, was the source of many great Philadelphia fortunes. The railroad's main trunk line to Harrisburg, developed in the 1840s, ran west from the city through farming country. In addition to acquiring right-of-way for its rail lines, the railroad also purchased farmland for suburban development and marketed properties as vacation homes, allowing Philadelphia's wealthy urbanites to escape the city's notoriously humid summers. These suburbs, known collectively as "The Main Line", developed rapidly. Wealthy Philadelphians purchased nearby farms, and upon hiring leading architects such as Horace Trumbauer and Frank Furness to design mansions, created a facsimile of aristocratic English country life.

The Montgomery family had originated in Ardrossan, a Scottish town in Ayrshire. Colonel Montgomery was born into modest circumstances in Darby, Pennsylvania, and was determined to achieve social prominence. Upon becoming wealthy (as a result of his firm's handling the financing and initial public offering of the Baldwin Locomotive Works), he acquired several adjacent farms on the Main Line and developed them in 1909, naming the property Ardrossan. "The big house", the 45-room Georgian mansion that was to become an icon of the old Main Line, was completed in 1912 from a design by Trumbauer. The interior design was handled by White, Allom and Company, whose clientele included English royalty. The manor house features 45 rooms, 13-foot (4.0 m)-high ceilings, and a dining room with accommodations for 36. Among the family portraits that decorate the walls are some painted by Gilbert Stuart and Thomas Sully, along with a famed portrait of Hope Montgomery Scott by Augustus John.

An apocryphal story indicates that the piano in the ballroom was a gift to Colonel Montgomery's second daughter, Mary Binney Montgomery, from Leopold Stokowski, who unsuccessfully proposed marriage to her twice. The piano story has long been debunked, but the relationship between the couple was on and off again between two of Stokowski's marriages. In its heyday, a full-time staff of 12 managed duties at the big house at Ardrossan. In addition to the main house, the estate was home to 38 other structures, including a number of homes historically significant in their own right. One structure dates to 1689; another was built in 1742. Until the death of Scott, Ardrossan was a working farm, featuring a prize-winning herd of Ayrshire dairy cattle.

=== The Philadelphia Story ===
Scott became a noted figure in the international social scene of the 1920s and 1930s. She danced the Charleston with Josephine Baker in Paris and the foxtrot with the Duke of Windsor at El Morocco. Confident and high-spirited, she is said to have convinced Edward VIII to stand on his head and reveal what was beneath his kilt (long johns), and claimed to have had to fight off the advances of a lecherous Augustus John. On one occasion, she seated her dog as a guest at a formal dinner party.

Her insouciance was to make her indirectly responsible for James Stewart's only Oscar, Katharine Hepburn's development into a major film star, and it is said, the popularity of "Tracy" as a girl's first name.

Edgar Scott and future New York playwright Philip Barry became fast friends while taking a playwrighting workshop at Harvard, taught by George Pierce Baker and after their marriage, the Scotts became lifelong friends of Barry and his wife, Ellen. The idle rich were a source of inspiration to Barry, who had also become interested in the then-new phenomenon of the tabloid newspaper. Tabloids, then as now notorious for gossip and scandal, were anathema to conservative, high-society families, and while on a visit to St. Paul, Minnesota, Barry had heard of a local criminal enterprise in which prominent wealthy families were being blackmailed with threats of exposing family scandals.

His wife Ellen had also suggested basing a play on Philadelphia's social elite. The result was The Philadelphia Story, a comedy of manners about a tabloid's invasion of a society girl's second wedding, which appeared on Broadway in 1939 starring Katharine Hepburn. The motion-picture rights were purchased by Hepburn's then-paramour, Howard Hughes, and her reprise of the role in the Metro-Goldwyn-Mayer feature film is said to have jump-started her stalled movie career. A later musical remake of the film, High Society, starred Grace Kelly also the daughter of a wealthy Philadelphia family.

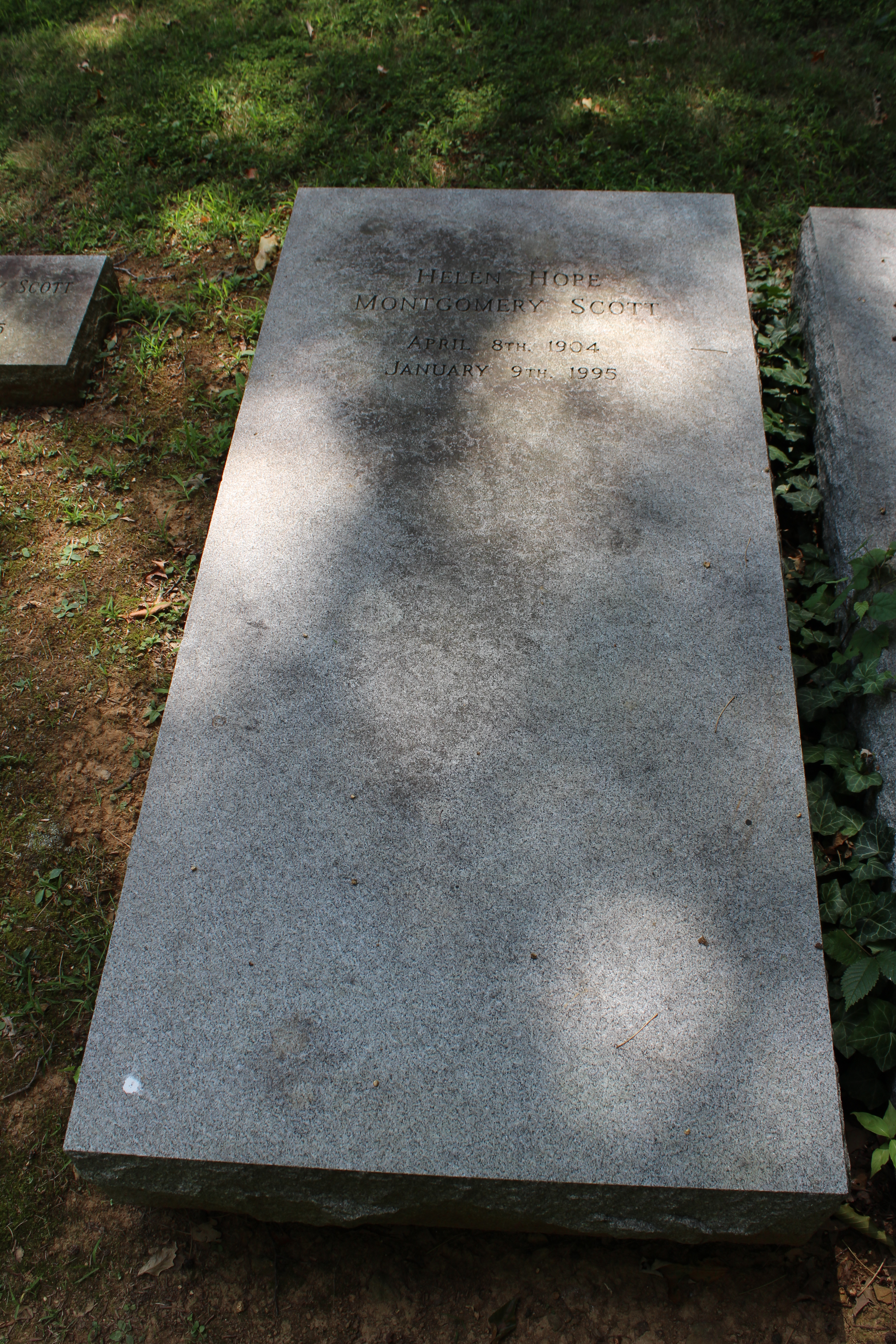
Scott's tombstone in St. David's Episcopal Church graveyard in Radnor, Pennsylvania

Following her father's death in 1949, Scott undertook the management of the Ardrossan Farms, modernizing the dairy facilities. Although her mother continued on as chatelaine of the big house, both Hope and her brother, who also lived on the estate, used the main house more and more for social events especially in support of the arts and during the week of the annual Devon Horse Show.

Scott won many awards for horsemanship during her lifetime. With her husband, she participated in fox hunting events and horse shows. A principal organizer of the Devon Horse Show after the Second World War, Scott was elected chairman and executive director of the annual event, which raises money to support the Bryn Mawr Hospital. She also served as a director of the United States Equestrian Team and of the American Horse Show Association.

== Death ==
Scott remained socially active until her death on January 9, 1995, at age 90. She was interred at St. David's Episcopal Church in Radnor, Pennsylvania.
