= Tomorrow and Tomorrow (film) =

1932 film

- Theatrical release poster
- Directed by: Richard Wallace
- Screenplay by: Josephine Lovett
- Starring: Ruth Chatterton; Robert Ames; Paul Lukas; Harold Minjir; Tad Alexander; Walter Walker; Arthur Pierson
- Music by: Herman Hand; Rudolph G. Kopp; John Leipold
- Production company: Paramount Pictures
- Distributed by: Paramount Pictures
- Release date: February 5, 1932
- Running time: 80 minutes
- Country: United States
- Language: English

Tomorrow and Tomorrow is a 1932 American Pre-Code drama film that was adapted from Philip Barry's play of the same name by Josephine Lovett. It was directed by Richard Wallace and stars Ruth Chatterton, Robert Ames, Paul Lukas, Harold Minjir, Tad Alexander, Walter Walker and Arthur Pierson. It was released on February 5, 1932, by Paramount Pictures.

== Cast ==
- Ruth Chatterton as Eve Redman
- Robert Ames as Gail Redman
- Paul Lukas as Dr. Nicholas Faber
- Harold Minjir as Samuel Gillespie
- Tad Alexander as Christian Redman
- Walter Walker as Dr. Walter Burke
- Arthur Pierson as Spike
- Margaret Armstrong as Miss Frazer
- Winter Hall as President Adee

== Critical reception ==
The Film Daily wrote that the film was an "absorbing triangle drama, expertly acted and directed", and commented that it was "probably more interesting because of the performances of Ruth Chatterton and Paul Lukas than for its story." They wrote that Chatterton's role was typical for her and would please her fans, while Lukas "scores strong" with "some of his best work to date."

== See also ==
- The House That Shadows Built (1931) Paramount promotional film with excerpts of Tomorrow and Tomorrow
