= The Philadelphia Story (play) =

1939 play by Philip Barry

- First edition
- Original language: English
- Written by: Philip Barry
- Subject: Love, marriage, divorce
- Genre: Comedy
- Setting: The suburbs of Philadelphia in the 1930s

Premiere
- Date: March 28, 1939
- Place: Shubert Theatre, New York City

The Philadelphia Story is a 1939 American comic play by Philip Barry. It tells the story of a socialite whose wedding plans are complicated by the simultaneous arrival of her ex-husband and an attractive journalist.

== Production ==
The character of Tracy Lord was inspired by Helen Hope Montgomery Scott, a Philadelphia socialite known for her hijinks, who had married a friend of playwright Philip Barry. Barry wrote The Philadelphia Story specifically for Katharine Hepburn, who ended up not only starring in but also financially backing the play, forgoing a salary in return for a percentage of the play's profits.

Produced by the Theatre Guild, The Philadelphia Story opened on March 28, 1939, at the Shubert Theatre in New York City, and closed on March 30, 1940. The three-act comedy was directed by Robert B. Sinclair, with lighting and scenery by Robert Edmond Jones.

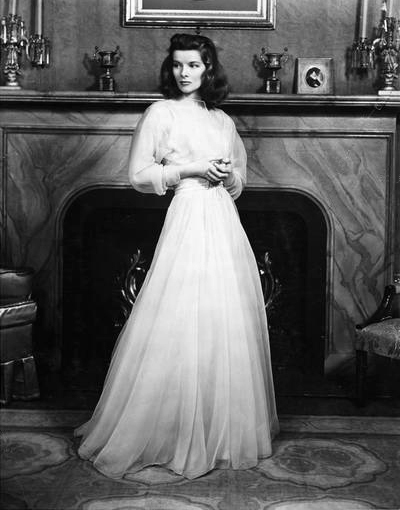
Katharine Hepburn

Vera Allen, Dan Tobin, Katharine Hepburn and Lenore Lonergan

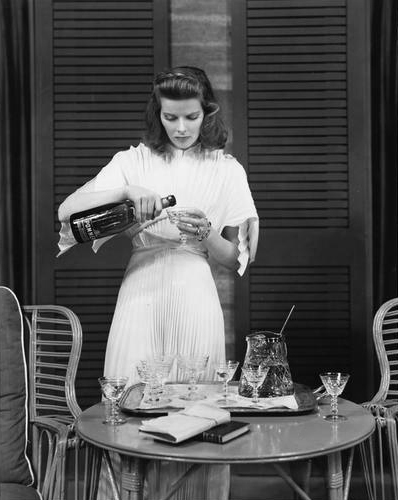
Katharine Hepburn

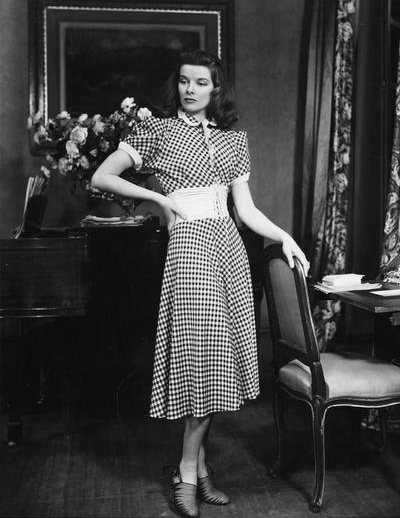
Katharine Hepburn

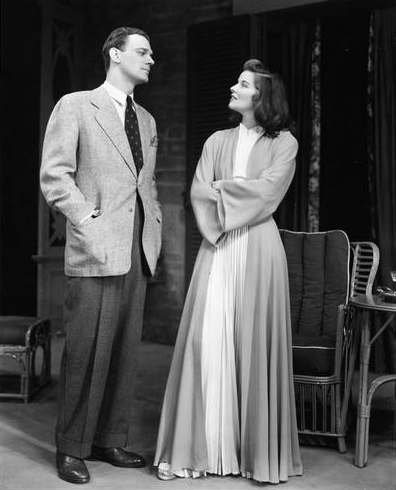
Joseph Cotten and Katharine Hepburn

== Cast ==
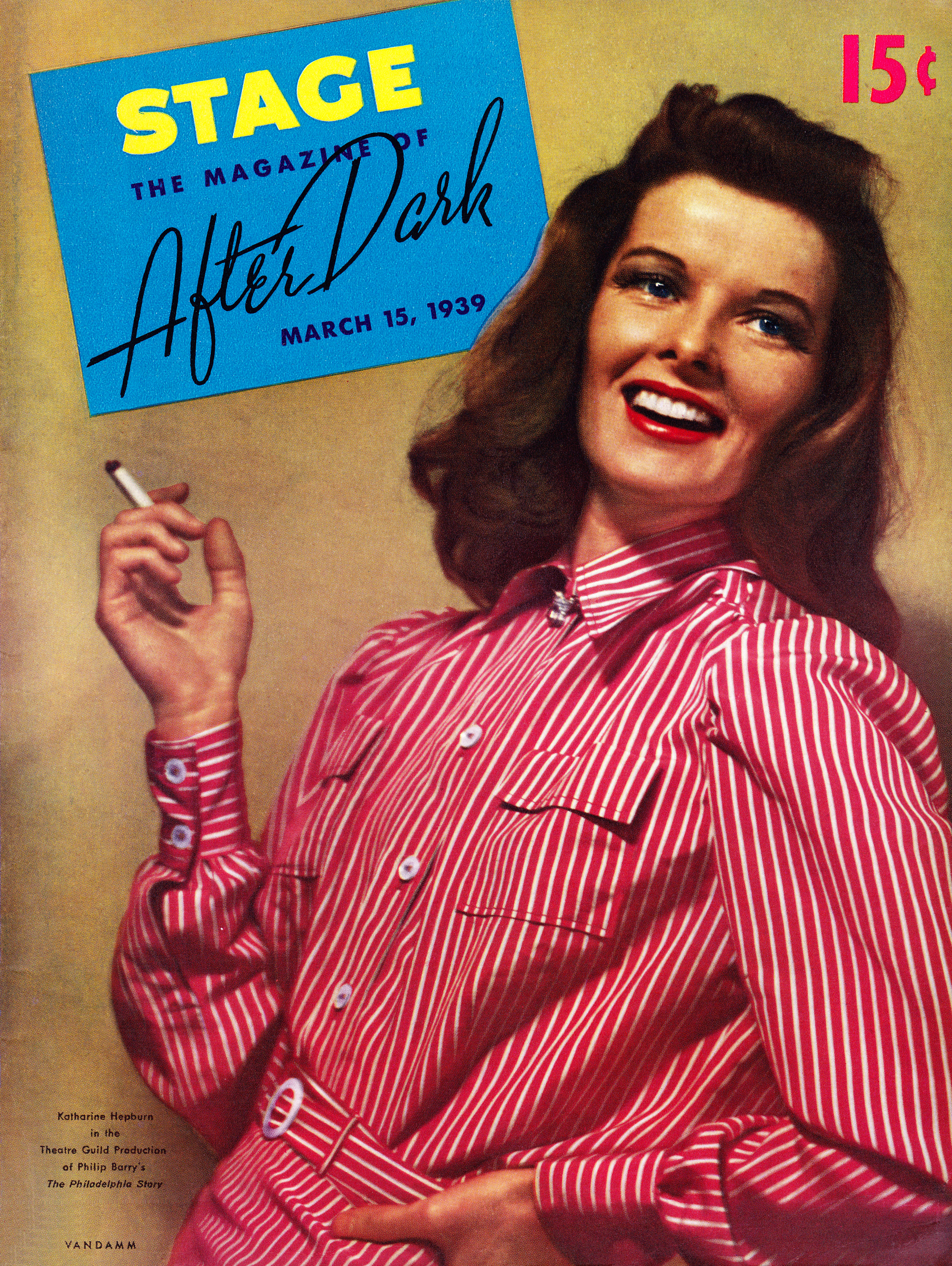
Katharine Hepburn in the Broadway stage production of The Philadelphia Story

- Lenore Lonergan as Dinah Lord
- Vera Allen as Margaret Lord
- Katharine Hepburn as Tracy Lord
- Dan Tobin as Alexander "Sandy" Lord
- Owen Coll as Thomas
- Forrest Orr as William Tracy
- Shirley Booth as Elizabeth Imbrie
- Van Heflin as Macauley Connor
- Frank Fenton as George Kittredge
- Joseph Cotten as C. K. Dexter Haven
- Nicholas Joy as Seth Lord
- Myrtle Tannahill as May
- Lorraine Bate as Elsie
- Hayden Rorke as Mac

== Adaptations ==
=== Film ===
Hoping to create a film vehicle for herself, which would erase the label of "Box Office Poison", Hepburn accepted the film rights to the play from Howard Hughes, who had purchased them as a gift for her. She then convinced MGM's Louis B. Mayer to buy them from her for only $250,000 in return for Hepburn having veto over producer, director, screenwriter, and cast.

In 1940 the play was adapted to film, in a Metro-Goldwyn-Mayer picture directed by George Cukor with Hepburn as the star, and starring Cary Grant as C.K. Dexter Haven and James Stewart as Macaulay Connor.

In 1956, it was adapted to a Metro-Goldwyn-Mayer musical film version, High Society with Grace Kelly in the Tracy Lord role, Bing Crosby as C.K. Dexter Haven and Frank Sinatra as Macaulay Connor.

=== Radio ===
Radio adaptations of The Philadelphia Story include a half-hour presentation on the Prudential Family Hour of Stars (February 26, 1950), starring Sarah Churchill, Norma Jean Nilsson, Gerald Mohr and Gene Kelly. An hour-long adaptation was broadcast August 17, 1952, on Best Plays, with a cast including Joan Alexander, Betty Furness, Myron McCormick and Vera Allen.

=== Television ===
The Philadelphia Story was adapted for the second season of the NBC-TV series, Robert Montgomery Presents. Starring Barbara Bel Geddes (Tracy Lord), Richard Derr (Macauley Connor) and Leslie Nielsen (C. K. Dexter Haven), the one-hour live program aired December 4, 1950.

On December 8, 1954, a live 60-minute adaptation of the play was broadcast on the CBS-TV series, The Best of Broadway. The cast included Mary Astor (Margaret Lord), Dorothy McGuire (Tracy Lord), Charles Winninger (Uncle Willie), Neva Patterson (Liz Imbrie), Richard Carlson (Mike Connor), Dick Foran (George Kittredge), John Payne (C.K. Dexter Haven) and Herbert Marshall (Seth Lord).

A two-hour adaptation aired on NBC-TV on December 7, 1959, directed by Fielder Cook and starring Gig Young (C.K. Dexter Haven), Diana Lynn (Tracy Lord), Christopher Plummer (Mike Connor), Ruth Roman (Liz Imbrie), Mary Astor (Margaret Lord), Don DeFore (George Kittredge), Alan Webb (Seth Lord), and Leon Janney (Sidney Kidd). The instrumental theme for this version, "Tracy's Theme", was released as a single by Robert Mersey under the name "Spencer Ross" and became a Top 20 hit.

== Copyright ==
Copyright for The Philadelphia Story was registered in 1939 by Barry and his wife, portrait artist Ellen Semple Barry, and was renewed by her in 1967. Her estate retains copyright to the play.
