= Donald Ogden Stewart =

American author and screenwriter (1894–1980)

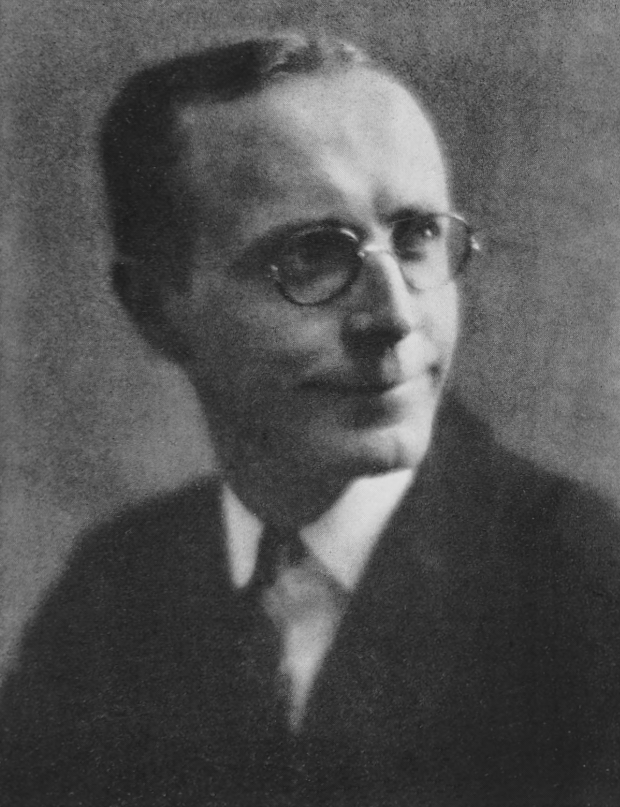
- Born: November 30, 1894; Columbus, Ohio
- Died: August 2, 1980 (aged 85); London, England
- Spouses: Beatrice Ames (m. 1924–1938) Ella Winter (m. 1939–1980)
- Awards: Academy Award for Best Adapted Screenplay; 1940 The Philadelphia Story

Donald Ogden Stewart (November 30, 1894 – August 2, 1980) was an American writer and screenwriter best known for his sophisticated golden age comedies and melodramas, such as The Philadelphia Story (based on the play by Philip Barry), Tarnished Lady and Love Affair. Stewart worked with a number of the directors of his time, including George Cukor (a frequent collaborator), Michael Curtiz and Ernst Lubitsch. Stewart was a member of the Algonquin Round Table and, with Ernest Hemingway's friend Bill Smith, the model for Bill Gorton in The Sun Also Rises. His 1922 parody on etiquette, Perfect Behavior, published by George H. Doran and Co., was a favorite book of P. G. Wodehouse.‍

== Life and career ==
His hometown was Columbus, Ohio. He graduated from Yale University, where he became a brother to the Delta Kappa Epsilon fraternity (Phi chapter), in 1916, and served in the U.S. Naval Reserve in World War I.

After the war he started to write, and found success with A Parody Outline of History, a satire of The Outline of History (1920) by H. G. Wells. This led him to becoming a member of the Algonquin Round Table. Around that time a friend of his got him interested in theater and he became a playwright on Broadway in the 1920s. He was friends with Dorothy Parker, Robert Benchley, George S. Kaufman, and Ernest Hemingway, who partly based the character of Bill Gorton in The Sun Also Rises on Stewart. In 1924, he wrote Mr. and Mrs. Haddock Abroad for the publishing house George H. Doran, a send-up of the "ugly American" tourist.

He became interested in adapting some of his plays to film, but on first entering Hollywood he had to adapt the plays of others as his own were initially shelved. Once there he mostly wrote, but he also had a small acting part in the film Not So Dumb. By the 1930s, he had become known primarily as a screenwriter, and won an Academy Award for The Philadelphia Story (1940). As World War II approached, he became a member of the Hollywood Anti-Nazi League, and admitted to being a member of the Communist Party USA at one of its public meetings.

During the Second Red Scare, Stewart was blacklisted in 1950; the following year, he and his wife, activist and writer Ella Winter (they had married in 1939), emigrated to England. In 1968, he signed the "Writers and Editors War Tax Protest" pledge, vowing to refuse tax payments in protest against the Vietnam War.‍ His 1975 memoir is entitled By a Stroke of Luck.

Stewart died in London on the 2nd August 1980. His widow died three days later. Stewart had two sons from a previous marriage.‍‍

== Film portrayal ==
Stewart was portrayed by the actor and playwright David Gow in the 1994 film Mrs. Parker and the Vicious Circle.

== Partial filmography ==
=== As a writer ===
- Brown of Harvard (1926) (adaptation)
- Humorous Flights (1929)
- Traffic Regulations (1929)
- Laughter (1930)
- Rebound (1931) (based on his play of the same name)
- Tarnished Lady (1931)
- Finn and Hattie (1931) (novel Mr and Mrs Haddock Abroad)
- Smilin' Through (1932) (dialogue)
- Dinner at Eight (1933) (additional dialogue)
- Going Hollywood (1933)
- Another Language (1933)
- The White Sister (1933)
- Manhattan Melodrama (1934)
- The Barretts of Wimpole Street (1934)
- No More Ladies (1935)
- The Prisoner of Zenda (1937) (additional dialogue)
- Marie Antoinette (1938) (screenplay)
- Holiday (1938) (screenplay)
- The Night of Nights (1939) (also story)
- Love Affair (1939)
- Kitty Foyle: The Natural History of a Woman (1940) (additional dialogue), aka Kitty Foyle (USA: short title)
- The Philadelphia Story (1940) (screenplay)
- Smilin' Through (1941) (screenplay)
- A Woman's Face (1941)
- That Uncertain Feeling (1941) (screenplay), aka Ernst Lubitsch's That Uncertain Feeling (USA: complete title)
- Keeper of the Flame (1942) (screenplay)
- Tales of Manhattan (1942)
- Forever and a Day (1943)
- Without Love (1945)
- Cass Timberlane (1947) (adaptation)
- Life with Father (1947)
- Edward, My Son (1949)
- The Prisoner of Zenda (1952) (additional dialogue) (originally uncredited)
- Summertime (1955) (uncredited)
- An Affair to Remember (1957) (originally uncredited)
- Love and Death (1975) (uncredited)‍

=== As an actor ===
- Holiday (1928) – Nick Potter
- Humorous Flights (1929) – Donald Ogden Stewart
- Night Club (1929/I)
- Not So Dumb (1930) – Skylar Van Dyke/Horace Patterson

== Journalism ==
- "The Love Life of Jimmy Durante", Photoplay, August 1932, p. 58.
