= Smart Woman =

Smart Woman is the title of the following films:

- Smart Woman (1931 film), starring Mary Astor, Robert Ames, and John Halliday
- Smart Woman (1948 film), featuring Brian Aherne, Constance Bennett, and Barry Sullivan
