= Holiday (play) =

1928 play by Philip Barry

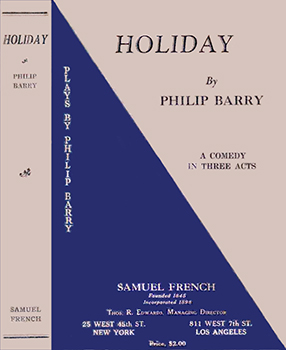
- First edition 1929
- Original language: English
- Written by: Philip Barry
- Genre: Comedy
- Setting: Edward Seton's home in New York City

Premiere
- Date: November 26, 1928
- Place: Plymouth Theatre; New York City, New York

Holiday is a 1928 play by Philip Barry which was twice adapted to film. The original play opened in New York on November 26, 1928, at the Plymouth Theatre and closed in June 1929, after 229 performances. It was directed by Arthur Hopkins, set design by Robert Edmond Jones, and costume design by Margaret Pemberton.

== Synopsis ==
The story follows Johnny Case, a corporate lawyer on Wall Street. He has abundant financial prospects but little social background. Before the start of the play, Julia, the eldest daughter of the Seton family, has met Johnny at Lake Placid. During the ten-day trip, they have fallen in love and are to be married. But there is one person who does not want the marriage this quickly: Julia's father, Edward, who questions Johnny's life's goal "to retire early and work late."

After Johnny makes $25,000, he plans to go away and enjoy life while he is still physically capable. The stock market being what it is in 1928, stocks keep climbing and climbing. Johnny achieves his goal and announces his plans even as Julia's father is announcing the engagement. Julia is upset at his decision; she wants a proper house in town and a place in the country. Now the woman Johnny met and fell in love with at Lake Placid is gone; she is just as materialistic as her father.

== Production ==
Produced and directed by Arthur Hopkins, Philip Barry's Holiday opened November 26, 1928 at the Plymouth Theatre. The three-act comedy featured scenic design by Robert Edmond Jones and costume design by Margaret Pemberton. It closed in June 1929 after 229 performances.

=== Cast ===
- Hope Williams as Linda Seton
- Ben Smith as Johnny Case
- Dorothy Tree as Julia Seton
- Monroe Owsley as Ned Seton
- Barbara White as Susan Potter
- Donald Ogden Stewart as Nick Potter
- Walter Walker as Edward Seton
- Rosalie Norman as Laura Cram
- Thaddeus Clancy as Seton Cram
- Cameron Clemens as Henry
- J. Ascher Smith as Charles
- Beatrice Ames as Delia

Katharine Hepburn was the understudy to Williams.

== Accolades ==
Holiday was included in Burns Mantle's The Best Plays of 1928–29.

== Adaptations ==
The play was adapted for film twice: The first filmed Holiday was released in 1930. Directed by Edward H. Griffith, it starred Ann Harding, Mary Astor, Edward Everett Horton, Robert Ames and Hedda Hopper. Holiday was filmed again in 1938. Directed by George Cukor, this version starred Katharine Hepburn, Cary Grant, Doris Nolan, Lew Ayres, and Edward Everett Horton, who reprised his role from the 1930 film. Donald Ogden Stewart wrote the screenplay adaptation.

The play was adapted by Richard Greenberg in 2026 at Goodman Theatre, running from January 31 - March 8.

== Revivals ==
The revival went up on December 3, 1995, at the Circle in the Square Theatre and closed on January 14, 1996, after 50 performances. It was directed by David Warren, sets by Derek McLane, costumes by Martin Pakledinaz, lighting by Donald Holder, sound and score by John Gromada, and style/movement by Loyd Williamson. The cast featured Tony Goldwyn as Johnny Case, Laura Linney as Linda Seton, Kim Raver as Julia Seton, Jim Oyster as Henry, Reese Madigan as Charles, Reg Rogers as Ned Seton, Tom Lacy as Edward Seton, Rod McLachlan as Seton Cram, Becca Lish as Laura Cram, Michael Countryman as Nick Potter, and Anne Lange as Susan Potter.
