= War Nurse =

1930 film

- Lobby card
- Directed by: Edgar Selwyn
- Written by: Joseph Farnham; Becky Gardiner
- Starring: Robert Montgomery; Anita Page; June Walker; Robert Ames
- Cinematography: Charles Rosher
- Edited by: William LeVanway
- Distributed by: Metro-Goldwyn-Mayer
- Release date: November 22, 1930
- Running time: 79 minutes
- Country: United States
- Language: English

War Nurse is a 1930 American pre-Code war film directed by Edgar Selwyn and starring Robert Montgomery, Anita Page, June Walker and Robert Ames.

== Plot ==
During World War I, a small diverse group of young American women leave for France to answer the urgent need for nurses, despite having little or no experience. Under the leadership of socialite Mrs. Townsend, they turn an abandoned building into a hospital.

They are soon joined by teenage blonde Joy Meadows (who later divulges to a patient she is "nearly nineteen"). Initially, she is teased for being inexperienced and coming from a privileged background. She is welcomed by Barbara "Babs" Whitney.

Babs attracts the persistent interest of Lieutenant Wally O'Brien, a fighter pilot. Joy has difficulty adjusting to the violent conditions and starts to miss her easy life on the Lower East Side in Manhattan after meeting a wounded New York soldier, Robbie Neil. She considers giving up, but Mrs. Townsend assures her that she will get used to it. Wally attempts to court Babs, but she is not vulnerable to his advances. They get acquainted, however, after Babs falls off of her bicycle and Wally takes care of her injured ankle.

As the months pass, Joy falls in love with Robbie. She dreams of getting married and having babies, and is certain that Robbie will soon ask her. Babs finally agrees to go out with Wally on her first leave since she arrived in France. The four go to a party, along with Brooklyn-born nurse Rosalie Parker and Wally's friend Frank Stevens. The other four leave first. On their way (in a car Wally "borrows"), the couple are subjected to a bomber attack; and Babs finally kisses Wally in the heat of the moment. When they arrive at the party, two drunk men maul her, so they return to her quarters. Wally wants to sleep with her, but Babs rejects him. They get into a major fight when he makes it clear he intends no serious relationship, only to live for the moment, knowing he may be killed at any time. The next morning, Wally announces to Babs that he is leaving on a mission over Germany. Babs is left wondering if she should have given in, while Joy believes she is engaged to Robbie.

Shortly after, Joy is told that Robbie is already married. Devastated, she arranges to be transferred to another hospital. Older nurse "Kansas" is killed by artillery while they are moving to a new location. Joy takes to partying wildly, even with married men, in Paris, causing such a scandal that Mrs. Townsend decides she has no choice but to send her back to America. Desperate to remain, Joy turns to Babs for help; Babs gives her an unofficial position. One day, Joy is shocked to find Robbie among their patients. He tells her that he has always loved her, then asks her to pray for him before dying. This soon causes Joy to crack under the pressure. The hospital is bombed, resulting in many deaths.

Later, Joy dies after giving birth to a son. Babs takes charge of the baby and considers naming him Wally. After the war ends, the adult Wally returns after being freed from a German prisoner-of-war camp, and tacitly admits he loves Babs.

== Cast ==
- Robert Montgomery as Lieutenant Wally O'Brien
- Anita Page as Joy Meadows
- June Walker as Barbara "Babs" Whitney
- Robert Ames as Lieutenant Robin "Robbie" Neil
- ZaSu Pitts as Cushie, a nurse
- Marie Prevost as Rosalie Parker
- Helen Jerome Eddy as Marian, aka "Kansas"
- Hedda Hopper as Mrs. Townsend
- Edward J. Nugent as Lieutenant Frank Stevens
- Martha Sleeper as Helen
- Michael Vavitch as Doctor
- John Miljan as French Medical Officer (uncredited)
- Loretta Young as Nurse (uncredited; scenes deleted except for a few far shots; replaced by Anita Page during filming)
- Sandra Ravel as French Chanteuse (uncredited)
