= The Wedding Song (1925 film) =

1925 film

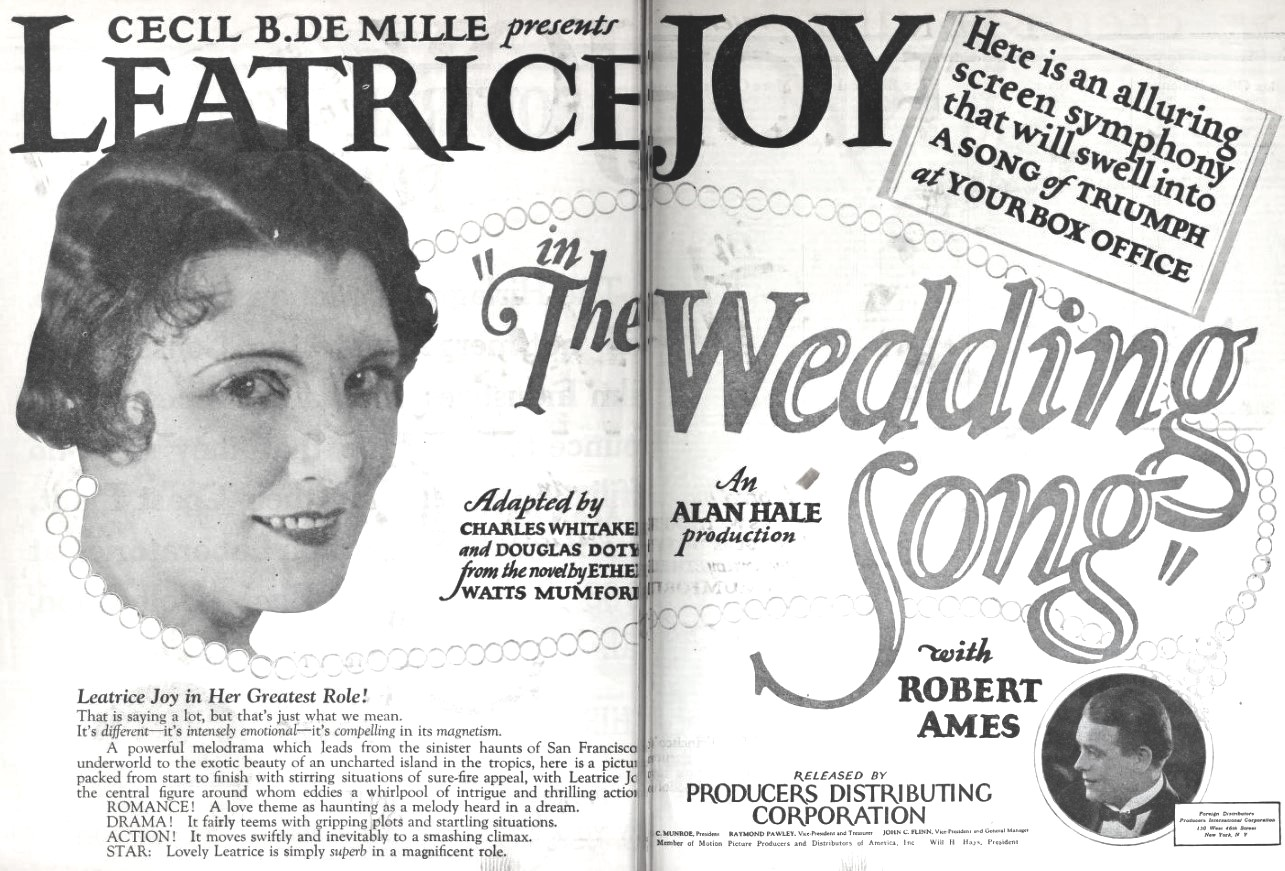
- Directed by: Alan Hale
- Written by: Douglas Z. Doty; George Marion Jr. Charles E. Whittaker
- Based on: The Wedding Song by Ethel Watts Mumford
- Produced by: Cecil B. DeMille
- Starring: Leatrice Joy; Robert Ames; Charles K. Gerrard
- Production company: Cinema Corporation of America
- Distributed by: Producers Distributing Corporation
- Release date: November 29, 1925
- Running time: 70 minutes
- Country: United States
- Language: Silent (English intertitles)

The Wedding Song is a 1925 American silent drama film directed by Alan Hale and starred Leatrice Joy, Robert Ames, and Charles K. Gerrard. It is based upon the novel of the same name by Ethel Watts Mumford.

== Plot ==
As described in a film magazine review, a young pearl fisher leaves his native island for the first time to go to San Francisco and dispose of the fortune in South Sea pearls he has gathered. On the steamer bound to San Francisco he meets and falls in love with a woman who is a member of a band of crooks who pose as her relatives. The pearler marries her, but she and her confederates are after the pearls. Following a series of adventures in which the woman is wounded with a gun, she learns that she really loves her husband. She warns him of a plot against his life in time to save him and they are reunited.

== Cast ==
- Leatrice Joy as Beatrice Glynn
- Robert Ames as Hayes Hallan
- Charles K. Gerrard as Paul Glynn
- Ruby Lafayette as Mother
- Rosa Rudami as Ethea
- Jack Curtis as George Pappadoulos
- Clarence Burton as Capt. Saltus
- Gertrude Claire as Grandma
- Ethel Wales as Auntie
- Gladden James as Jeffrey King
- Casson Ferguson as Madison Melliah
- Mai Wells as Old Woman (uncredited)

== Preservation ==
A complete print of The Wedding Song is held in the UCLA Film & Television Archive.

== Bibliography ==
- Munden, Kenneth White. The American Film Institute Catalog of Motion Pictures Produced in the United States, Part 1. University of California Press, 1997.
