= Confession (1929 film) =

1929 film

- Directed by: Lionel Barrymore
- Story by: Kenyon Nicholson
- Starring: Robert Ames; Carroll Nye; Christiane Yves
- Production company: Metro-Goldwyn-Mayer
- Distributed by: Metro-Goldwyn-Mayer
- Release date: January 12, 1929
- Country: United States

Confession is a 1929 American black and white short film directed by Lionel Barrymore and starring Robert Ames and Carroll Nye. It is based on a playlet by Kenyon Nicholson.

== Cast ==
- Robert Ames as 1st Soldier
- Carroll Nye as 2nd Soldier
- Christiane Yves as 1st French Woman
- Yvonne Starke as 2nd French Woman
