= Behind Office Doors =

1931 film

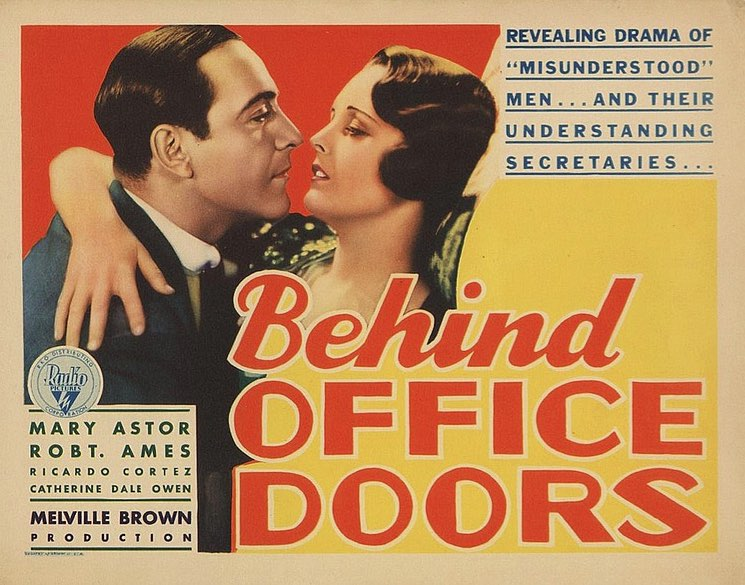
- Lobby card
- Directed by: Melville W. Brown
- Written by: Carey Wilson (screenplay); J. Walter Ruben (adaptation and dialogue)
- Based on: Private Secretary; 1929 novel by Alan Schultz
- Produced by: William LeBaron; Henry Hobart (associate)
- Starring: Mary Astor; Robert Ames; Ricardo Cortez
- Cinematography: J. Roy Hunt
- Edited by: Archie Marshek; Rose Loewinger
- Music by: Max Steiner
- Distributed by: RKO Radio Pictures
- Release date: July 5, 1931 (US)
- Running time: 82 minutes
- Country: United States
- Language: English

Behind Office Doors

Behind Office Doors is a 1931 American pre-Code drama film directed by Melville W. Brown, from a screenplay by Carey Wilson and J. Walter Ruben, based on Alan Schultz's 1929 novel, Private Secretary. It starred Mary Astor, Robert Ames and Ricardo Cortez, and revolved around the premise of "the woman behind the man". While not well received by critics, it did well at the box office.

== Plot ==
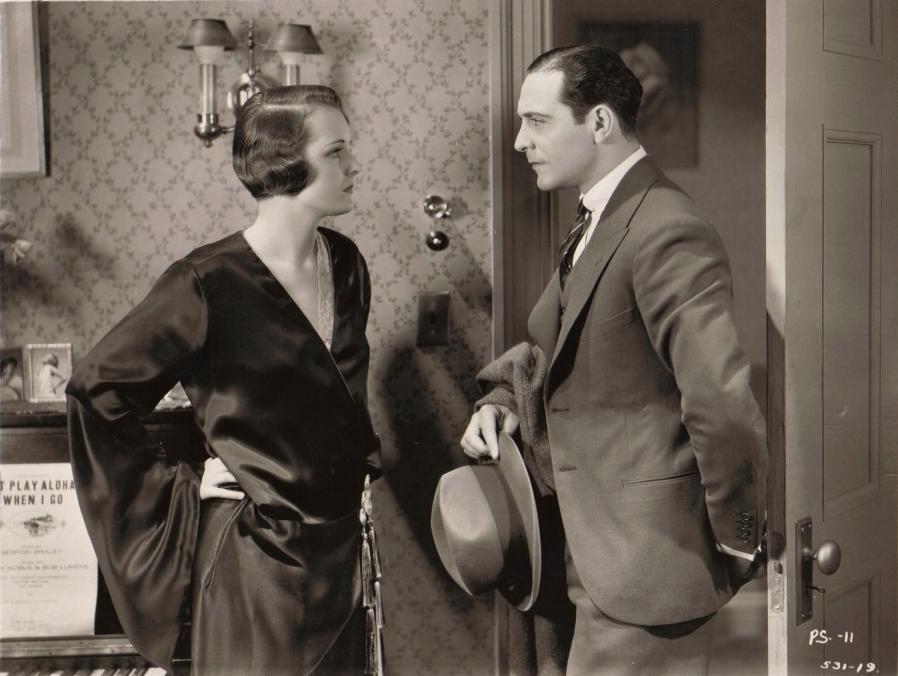
Mary Astor and Ricardo Cortez

Mary Linden is a receptionist at a paper milling company, who is secretly in love with one of the salesmen, James Duneen. Her extensive knowledge of the paper industry, the mill and its clients allows her to have input in company operations far outweighing her job title. As the president of the company, Ritter, approaches retirement, Mary uses her skill in company politics to enable James to make some important sales coups, after which she begins a fifth-column attempt to get him named as the next president. James, for his part, is grateful to her for her help, but is completely oblivious to her romantic interest in him, preferring more the party girl type.

When Ritter does retire, James wins the position, and Mary is promoted to be his personal secretary. Still unaware of her feelings, he hires his latest party girl, Daisy, to work in the office, and report to Mary. Mary is upset by this turn of events, but remains faithful to James, assisting him with running the company. In fact, it is her knowledge and acumen which makes the company successful. Mary even spurns the advances of several men, including the wealthy Ronnie Wales, who, although married, is estranged from his wife and wishes to pursue an affair with Mary.

However, when James becomes engaged to the daughter of a wealthy banker, Ellen May Robinson, that is the straw which breaks Mary's resolve. She resigns from the company, and eventually agrees to go away with Ronnie for an assignation in Atlantic City. The paper mill suffers terribly from a lack of good management, since most of James' success was due to Mary's guidance. James tracks her down before she can give in to the advances of Ronnie, and begs Mary to return. She is reluctant, until she discovers that James has broken off his engagement with Ellen, and upon her return to the company she is not only met with a job offer, but also a marriage proposal from him.

== Cast ==
- Mary Astor as Mary Linden
- Robert Ames as James Duneen
- Ricardo Cortez as Ronnie Wales
- Catherine Dale Owen as Ellen May Robinson
- Kitty Kelly as Delores Kogan
- Edna Murphy as Daisy Presby
- Charles Sellon as John Ritter
- William Morris as Banker Charles H. Robinson
- George MacFarlane

(Cast list as per AFI database)

== Soundtrack ==
- "Three Little Words", music by Harry Ruby, lyrics by Bert Kalmar - played as dance music in the nightclub

== Reception ==
While the public seemed to like the film, critics like Mordaunt Hall of The New York Times were less kind, stating that the film "is a witless and interminably dull exhibition on which three capable players, Mary Astor, Robert Ames and Ricardo Cortez, have been sacrifi[c]ed to very little purpose.

== Notes ==
In 1959, the film entered the public domain in the United States because the claimants did not renew its copyright registration in the 28th year after publication.

The working title for this film was the title of the novel on which it was based, Private Secretary.
