= Box Office Poison (magazine article) =

Term for unpopular actor

Box Office Poison is the title given in popular culture to a trade magazine advertisement taken out on May 4, 1938, in The Hollywood Reporter by the Independent Theatre Owners Association. Penned by the group's president, Harry Brandt, the title of the red-bordered ad was WAKE UP! Hollywood Producers. The ad named several actors "whose box office draw is nil", and added that "Dietrich, too, is poison at the box office" that led to the moniker by which it is popularly remembered.

== Content ==
The full content of the advert:

WAKE UP! HOLLYWOOD PRODUCERS

Practically all of the major studios are burdened with stars—whose public appeal is negligible—receiving tremendous salaries necessitated by contractual obligations. Having these stars under contract, and paying them sizeable sums weekly, the studios find themselves in the unhappy position to having put these box office deterrents in expensive pictures in the hope that some return on the investment might be had.

This condition is not only burdensome to the studios and its stockholders but is likewise no boon to exhibitors who in the final analysis, suffer by the non-drawing power of these players. Among these players, whose dramatic ability is unquestioned, but whose box office draw is nil, can be numbered Mae West, Edward Arnold, Garbo, Joan Crawford, Katharine Hepburn, and many, many others. Garbo, for instance, is a tremendous draw for Europe, which does not help theater owners in the United States. Hepburn turned in excellent performances in Stage Door and Bringing Up Baby, but both pictures died.

The combined salaries of these stars take millions out of the industry and millions out of the box office. We are not against the star system, mind you, but we don't think it should dominate the production of pictures. We want the Myrna Loys and Gary Coopers and Sonja Henies, but we want them when we get value, not when they drive people away from the box office. And here we meet up with a situation where the exhibitors suffer for the producers' mistakes. Producers know the stars who attract business because there are few producers who do not have theatre affiliates, and those who do not just have to read their percentage contracts to find out which stars bring in the shekels. Yet, so afraid are the studios of losing a star, they tie them up for many years with the result that stars continue to receive top salaries far after their box office rating slides. Kay Francis, for instance, is still receiving many thousands a week from Warners on an old contract. Yet so poor is her draw, she is now making 'B' pictures. Paramount showed cleverness and consideration for exhibitors by buying off Dietrich's contract, which called for one more picture. Dietrich, too, is poison at the box office.

There is no doubt but that stars draw business and when they do they are worth every cent they get. When they do not it is unfair to the industry at large and especially the exhibitor for a studio to continue paying them top salaries and putting them in top bracket pictures. From recent producer statements, it would seem they are just about getting around to that idea. The success of the Jones Family pictures, the Mr. Motos and the Charlie Chans, as well as the Judge Hardy pictures and others is a straw in the wind. Producers are now, or soon will be, concentrating on the making of good pictures, not merely surrounding a $5,000-a-week star with any sort of vehicle.

Sound judgment and good business sense are valuable assets in an industry that is far from being an art.

— Independent Theatre Owners Association

== Response ==
Articles appeared in many US newspapers chronicling the uproar in Hollywood after the association published the ad. Time magazine later that May published responses from some of the stars:

But a few of the stars themselves had ready answers. Actress Hepburn last week terminated the RKO Radio contract that had brought her from $75,000 to $100,000 a picture and was considering five better offers "They say I'm a has-been," scoffed she. "If I weren't laughing so hard, I might cry." Joan Crawford had just signed a new five-year contract with Metro-Goldwyn-Mayer at a figure reported to be $1,500,000. "Box-office poison?" chirruped Actress Crawford.

In Boston, maligned Mae West was breakfasting in bed. "Why. the independent theatre owners call me the mortgage-lifter." she burbled. "When business is bad they just re-run one of my pictures. ... The box-office business in the entire industry has dropped off 30%. ... The only picture to make real money was Snow White and the Seven Dwarfs, and that would have made twice as much if they'd had me play Snow White."

Louella Parsons included a mention of the Brandt ad in her 1938 New Year's Eve summation of the year in entertainment. When Hepburn's The Philadelphia Story opened at Radio City Music Hall to large crowds in December 1940, Brandt sent a telegram to Katharine Hepburn that stated "Come on back, Katie. All is forgiven."

Harry Brandt made other public demands of film studios.

== Legacy ==
The term "box office poison" continues in use in magazine articles and opinion pieces. Over the years, several more "Box Office Poison" lists have been submitted in newspapers, in magazines, or more recently, online. In 1949, Mary Armitage's Film Close-Ups newspaper labeled many stars as "poison" at the box office, among them Sylvia Sidney, James Cagney, Henry Fonda, Ingrid Bergman, Jennifer Jones, John Hodiak, and two actresses that in 1938 were said to have "deserved" their salaries, Bette Davis and Shirley Temple. A BBC article about Hepburn and The Philadelphia Story, written in 2021, still refers to her being labeled in 1938 by Brandt as "box office poison". Brandt's 1972 obituary in The New York Times did not mention his involvement in the creation of the term.

Music artist Snax has been producing under the moniker Box Office Poison since 2015. The musical genre is house and disco/pop produced by Snax and features guest vocalists.
