= Robert Ames (actor) =

American actor (1889–1931)

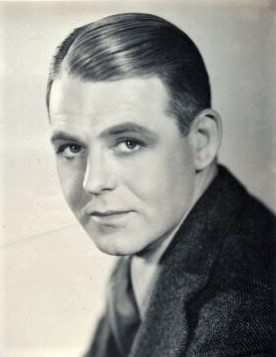
- Ames as Johnny Case in Holiday (1930)
- Born: Robert Downing Ames; March 23, 1889; Hartford, Connecticut, U.S.
- Died: November 27, 1931 (aged 42); New York City, U.S.
- Resting place: Cedar Hill Cemetery, Hartford, Connecticut
- Occupation: Actor
- Years active: 1915–1931
- Spouses: Alice Gerry (m. 1908; div. 1916) Frances Goodrich (m. 1917; div. 1923) Vivienne Segal (m. 1923; div. 1926) Muriel Oakes (m. 1927; div. 1930)
- Children: 2

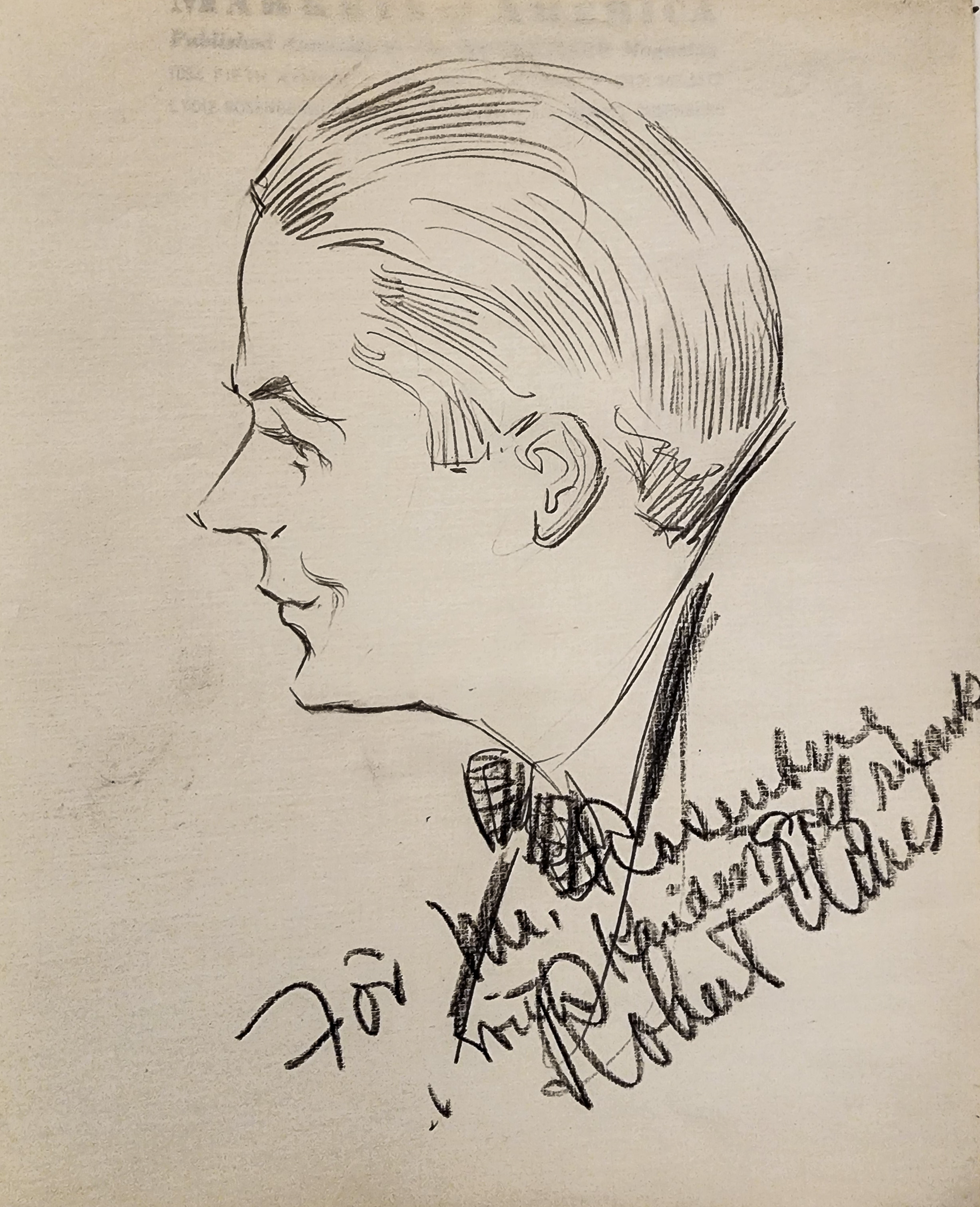
Signed drawing of Robert Ames by Manuel Rosenberg 1920

Robert Downing Ames (March 23, 1889 – November 27, 1931) was an American actor.

== Early life ==
Ames was born in Hartford, Connecticut, where his father, Louis Mason Ames, was employed as an accountant for an insurance company and his mother, Mary Elma (née Downing) Ames, worked as a voice coach.

== Career ==
=== Non-acting ===
Ames's first association with the theater came when he worked as a clerk in the box office of Parsons's Theater. In 1907, he left that job to become treasurer of the Academy of Music at Fall River He returned to Parsons's Theater in 1908, once more selling tickets.

=== Stage career ===
Ames's first big acting break came when a friend brought him to the attention of the actor Henry Miller, which led to a role in Miller's production of The Great Divide by William Vaughn Moody. Ames spent eleven seasons with Miller's company before moving on to Jessie Bonstelle's stock company for eight seasons and the Municipal Stock Company for three. His first Broadway success came in 1916 playing Charles Daingerfield (alias Brindlebury) opposite Ruth Chatterton in Come Out of the Kitchen by A.E. Thomas. Ames played leading roles in The Hero (1921) by Gilbert Emery, Lights Out (1922) by Paul Dickey and Mann Page, Icebound (1923) by Owen Davis, We've Got to Have Money (1923) by Edward Laska, and The Desert Flower (1924) by Don Mullally.

=== Film career ===
After a brief stint in vaudeville, Ames moved to Hollywood in the mid 1920s to concentrate on film work, though on occasion he would return to perform on the New York stage. He co-starred in several early talkies, including The Trespasser (1929) with Gloria Swanson, A Lady to Love (1930) with Vilma Bánky and Edward G. Robinson, and the 1930 version of Holiday, in the role later played by Cary Grant in the better-remembered 1938 remake.

== Personal life ==
Ames married Alice Gerry in May 1908. They had a daughter and son before their divorce nine years later. His second wife was actress/writer Frances Goodrich. This union ended in 1923 after six years of marriage. Later that same year Ames married actress/singer Vivienne Segal. She obtained a divorce from him on June 28, 1926. On February 10, 1927, he married socialite Muriel Oakes in Waukegan, Illinois. That marriage lasted three years before she filed for divorce in 1930. The day after his marriage to Oakes, Ames was slapped with a $200,000 breach-of-promise lawsuit by nightclub entertainer Helen Lambert, who claimed he had promised to marry her after his divorce from Segal. Over the last months of his life, Ames was linked romantically in the press with stage and film actress Ina Claire.

== Death ==
On November 27, 1931, Ames was found dead in his room at the Hotel Delmonico in New York City. Ames had traveled to New York from Hollywood to spend time with his family over the Thanksgiving holiday and to begin work on a film for Paramount Pictures. At the time of his death, Ames was taking a non-narcotic medication for alcohol withdrawal delirium. A later autopsy could find no trace of alcohol or other medications in his system, only that he was in the early stages of developing heart disease. The official cause of death was attributed to delirium tremens most likely brought on by his sudden abstinence from alcohol. He was interred at Cedar Hill Cemetery in Hartford, Connecticut.

== Partial filmography ==
- What Women Want (1920)
- Without Mercy (1925)
- The Wedding Song (1925)
- Three Faces East (1926)
- The Crown of Lies (1926)
- Marianne (1929 silent version)
- Voice of the City (1929)
- The Trespasser (1929)
- Rich People (1929)
- Nix on Dames (1929)
- Confession (1929)
- A Lady to Love (1930)
- Holiday (1930)
- War Nurse (1930)
- Not Damaged (1930)
- Madonna of the Streets (1930)
- Millie (1931)
- Behind Office Doors (1931)
- The Stolen Jools (1931 short)
- Rebound (1931)
- Three Who Loved (1931)
- Smart Woman (1931)
- Rich Man's Folly (1931)
