= Ellen Semple Barry =

American painter

- Born: Ellen Marshall Semple; October 4, 1898; New York City, New York, US
- Died: June 8, 1995 (aged 96); Los Angeles, California, US
- Spouse: Philip Barry
- Parent(s): Lorenzo Semple, Mary McAnerney
- Writing career
- Genres: Portraiture, Theatre

Ellen Semple Barry (née Semple; October 4, 1898 – June 12, 1995) was an American portrait artist whose subjects included Dean Acheson, William S. Paley, Vincent Astor, W. Averell Harriman and Pablo Picasso. Some of her portraits are hung in the National Portrait Gallery. She was married to the playwright Philip Barry.

== Biography ==
Ellen Semple was the daughter of Lorenzo Semple, a Southern lawyer, and Mary Semple.

Portraits hung in the National Portrait Gallery include Lady Bird Johnson, Archibald MacLeish and Eleanor Roosevelt.
