= Smart Woman (1931 film) =

1931 film

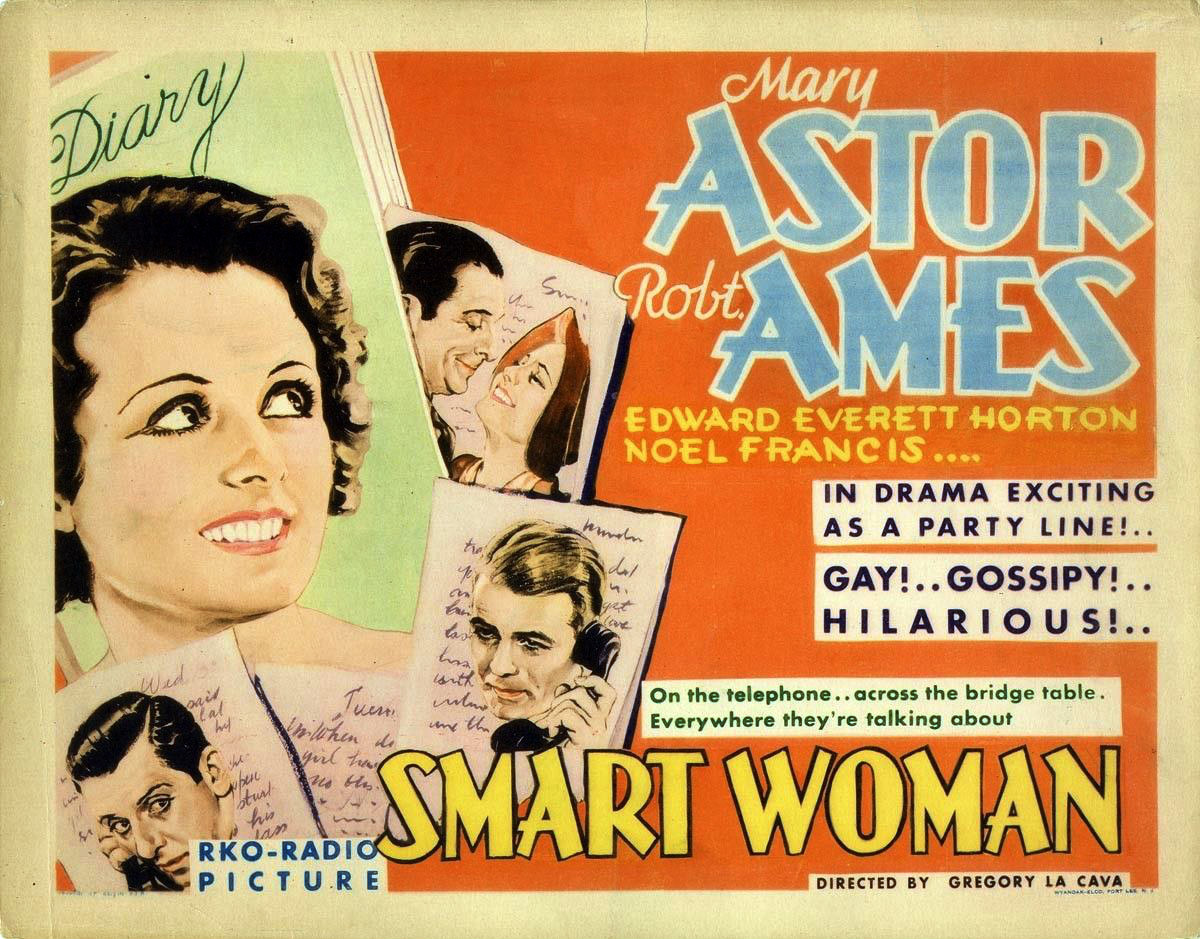
- Lobby card
- Directed by: Gregory La Cava
- Written by: Salisbury Field (adaptation and dialogue)
- Based on: Nancy's Private Affair; 1930 play by Myron Coureval Fagan
- Produced by: William LeBaron
- Starring: Mary Astor; Robert Ames; John Halliday
- Cinematography: Nick Musuraca
- Edited by: Ann McKnight
- Production company: RKO Radio Pictures
- Distributed by: RKO Radio Pictures
- Release date: September 12, 1931
- Running time: 68 minutes
- Country: United States
- Language: English

Smart Woman is a 1931 pre-Code comedy-romance and drama film directed by Gregory La Cava and starring Mary Astor, Robert Ames, and John Halliday.

== Plot ==
Nancy Gibson sets out to regain the affections of her cheating husband Donald Gibson, after she returns from a trip to Paris, where she had to look after her sick mother. To welcome her in her beautiful house are her servants as well as her husband, his business partner, Billy and sister Sally Ross. Nancy learns that Don is with his mistress, Peggy Preston, who very often is accompanied by her mother Mrs. Preston. Nancy has the affection of the Rosses and her servants, but she is at first very shocked. Then she decides to play the modern wife and invites Peggy Preston and her mother for the weekend in her house as her guests. Pretending she herself has fallen for Sir Guy Harrington, a man she met in Europe (in fact she met him on the ship on the way home), she invites him too, hoping his flirtation will help her to gain back her husband, whom she still loves.

== Cast ==
- Mary Astor as Mrs. Nancy Gibson
- Robert Ames as Donald Gibson
- John Halliday as Sir Guy Harrington
- Edward Everett Horton as Billy Ross
- Ruth Weston as Mrs. Sally Gibson Ross
- Noel Francis as Peggy Preston
- Gladys Gale as Mrs. Preston
- Alfred Cross as Brooks the Butler
- Lillian Harmer as Mrs. Windleweaver
- Bill Elliott as Reporter on Ship (uncredited)
- Harold Miller as Deck Lounger (uncredited)
- Dennis O'Keefe as Passenger Departing Ship (uncredited)
- Pearl Varvalle as Helen, Gibson's maid (uncredited)

== Reception ==
In his New York Times review, critic Mordaunt Hall called Smart Woman a "neat diversion"..."spoken by competent players and Gregory La Cava has directed it with a keen eye on its none too rugged story."
