= Holiday (1938 film) =

1938 film by George Cukor

- Theatrical release poster
- Directed by: George Cukor
- Screenplay by: Donald Ogden Stewart; Sidney Buchman
- Based on: Holiday 1928 play by Philip Barry; Holiday 1930 film by Philip Barry
- Produced by: Everett Riskin
- Starring: Katharine Hepburn; Cary Grant; Doris Nolan; Lew Ayres; Edward Everett Horton; Henry Kolker; Binnie Barnes; Jean Dixon; Henry Daniell
- Cinematography: Franz Planer
- Edited by: Al Clark; Otto Meyer
- Color process: Black and white
- Production company: Columbia Pictures
- Distributed by: Columbia Pictures
- Release date: June 15, 1938 (United States)
- Running time: 95 minutes
- Country: United States
- Language: English

Holiday (released in the United Kingdom as Free to Live) is a 1938 American romantic screwball comedy film directed by George Cukor, a remake of the 1930 film of the same name.

The film tells of a man who has risen from humble beginnings only to be torn between his free-thinking lifestyle and the tradition of his wealthy fiancée's family.

The film, adapted by Donald Ogden Stewart and Sidney Buchman from the 1928 play of the same name by Philip Barry, stars Katharine Hepburn and Cary Grant and features Doris Nolan, Lew Ayres, and Edward Everett Horton. Horton reprised his role as Professor Nick Potter from the 1930 version.

Although Hepburn had been Hope Williams's understudy in the original production of the play on Broadway, she played the part for only one performance. Screenwriter Donald Ogden Stewart appeared in the original stage version as Nick Potter.

== Plot ==
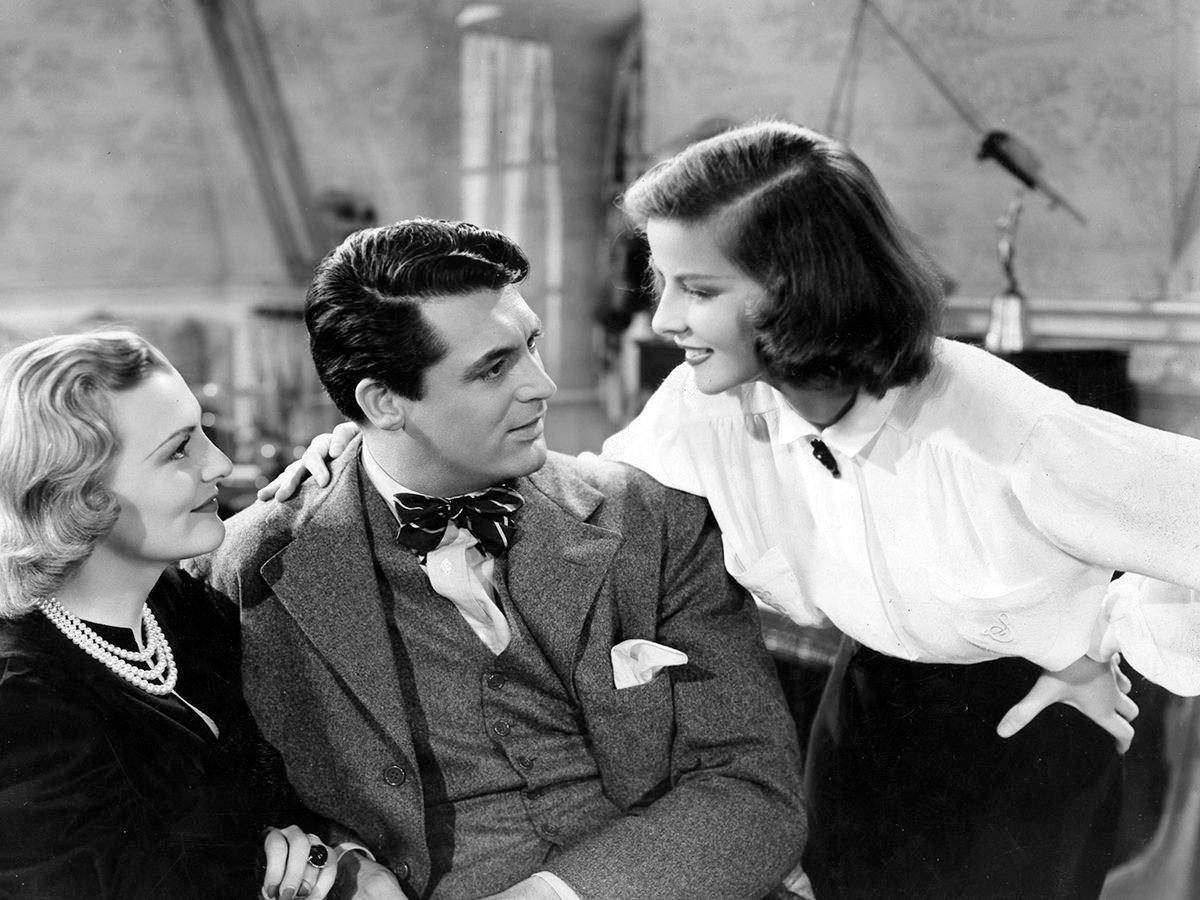
Doris Nolan, Cary Grant and Katharine Hepburn in Holiday

Jonathan "Johnny" Case is an investment banker and self-made man. He has worked all his life and is about to marry Julia Seton, whom he met while on holiday in Lake Placid, New York. He knows very little about his bride-to-be and is surprised to learn that she is from an extremely wealthy family, the older daughter of banker Edward Seton.

Johnny meets Julia's vivacious younger sister, Linda, to whom he confides his plan to take a long holiday from work to find the meaning of life. Johnny wants to retire at the age of 30. He told Linda he has worked since the age of 10. He also meets the sisters' brother, Ned Jr., an alcoholic whose spirit has been broken by subservience to their father. At first, Julia's father is stunned when she tells him her plan to marry Johnny, but he is appeased after meeting Johnny and looking into his work history. Edward Sr. plans an elaborate New Year's Eve engagement party, even though Julia had promised Linda that she, Linda, could throw a smaller party for Johnny and herself, one that would include only close friends.

On New Year's Eve, Linda is upset that she did not get to throw the engagement party she was promised and refuses to come downstairs. Julia sends Johnny to get her, and he finds her and Ned in "the playroom," the one truly human room in the enormous and over-built Park Avenue mansion. They are with Johnny's off-beat friends, Professor Nick Potter and his wife, Susan, who had gotten lost in the house and serendipitously ended up there. The group spends a joyful time together, and Julia and Edward Sr. find them just as Johnny and Linda are completing a tumbling trick.

Mr. Seton asks Linda to come downstairs to the engagement party, and she says no and that she would prefer her own holiday somewhere else. Mr. Seton is embarrassed. Mr. Seton later offers Johnny a job at his bank, and Johnny reveals his plans for a holiday from work. Julia is appalled that her boyfriend said no to her father. Julia tells Johnny that it is simply a thrill to work.

After bringing in the New Year with Linda, Johnny proceeds with the announcement of his engagement to Julia. Meanwhile, Linda confides her true feelings for Johnny to a drunken Ned, though she insists she will never act on them out of loyalty to her sister. Johnny soon slips out of the mansion alone, pausing only to wish the kitchen staff a happy New Year.

Hoping to patch things up between Johnny and Julia, Linda visits the Potters and finds them packing for a voyage to Europe. They tell her that Johnny is planning to go as well and that he has asked Julia to go with them. A telegram arrives, informing them that Julia has turned him down. Linda returns home, hoping to change her sister's mind, but they argue instead. Julia is certain that Johnny will give up his plans and return to her. Just then, Johnny arrives with a proposed compromise: he will work at the bank for two years but will quit then if he is unhappy.

Mr. Seton accepts this, and Julia and he begin planning the couple's honeymoon in minute detail, mixing together stops at the homes of relatives with business-related matters. They discuss hiring servants to work at Julia and Johnny's new home without consulting Johnny. He realizes that marrying Julia on those terms will be more of an encumbrance on his freedom than he can abide. He begs Julia to marry him that evening and travel to Europe with him. She says no. He leaves to meet the Potters and set sail.

Linda sees from Julia's reaction that she is relieved by Johnny's decision. Linda makes Julia admit that she does not really love Johnny after all. With the way now clear and inspired by Johnny, Linda renounces her father's stifling influence and declares her independence. She asks Ned to go with her, and when he cannot, she promises to come back for him. Linda rushes off to meet Johnny and the Potters to go on holiday.

Meanwhile, the Potters arrive at the ship, saddened that Johnny had decided to take the bank job. Johnny arrives, surprising them and explains that he could not go through with it. They cheerfully celebrate. In the middle of doing a back flip in the ship's hallway, Johnny sees Linda arrive. He falls on his stomach rather than finishing. As she greets the three of them, Johnny takes her hand, pulls her to the floor, and they kiss.

== Cast ==
- Katharine Hepburn as Linda Seton
- Cary Grant as Johnny Case
- Doris Nolan as Julia Seton
- Lew Ayres as Edward "Ned" Seton Jr.
- Edward Everett Horton as Professor Nick Potter
- Henry Kolker as Edward Seton Sr.
- Binnie Barnes as Laura Cram
- Jean Dixon as Susan Potter
- Henry Daniell as Seton Cram

Jean Dixon retired from films after this performance.

== Production ==
In 1936, Columbia Pictures purchased a group of scripts, including the script for Holiday, from RKO for $80,000. Although the film was intended to reunite The Awful Truth co-stars Cary Grant and Irene Dunne, George Cukor decided to cast Hepburn instead, and Columbia borrowed her from RKO, where she had just turned down the lead role in Mother Carey's Chickens. Joan Bennett and Ginger Rogers were considered to play Hepburn's role, and Rita Hayworth was tested for the role of Julia.

The character of Linda Seton, played by Hepburn, was loosely based on socialite Gertrude Sanford Legendre. Donald Ogden Stewart, who co-wrote the screenplay, had played Professor Nick Potter in the original Broadway cast. Katharine Hepburn had understudied the role of Linda Seton in the original Broadway cast. The working titles for the film were Unconventional Linda and Vacation Bound.

A scene that was to come before what is now the first scene of the film was set in the snows of Lake Placid, New York, but it was filmed in Bishop, California. The idea was to "open up" the stage play by utilizing an exterior scene, but when director George Cukor saw the scene, he did not like it and decided to cut it. A few still photographs, one of them on a lobby card that was distributed to theaters, are the only known remnants of this scene.

== Reception ==
Holiday currently holds an approval rating of perfect 100% on Rotten Tomatoes, based on 23 professional reviews. Although both The Hollywood Reporter and Variety predicted the film would have great box-office appeal, Holiday was not a financial success. It was well received by critics who praised the "modernizing" of the screenplay into an implied "contest between a young New Dealer and an Old Reactionary." The Hollywood Reporter went so far as to say it should "take its place in the parade of periodic hits, along with It Happened One Night, Mr. Deeds, and The Awful Truth." Pauline Kael wrote: "In the 30s, Katharine Hepburn's wit and nonconformity made ordinary heroines seem mushy, and her angular beauty made the round-faced ingenues look piggy and stupid. Here she is in her archetypal role ... she was the moving force behind this graceful film ... Cary Grant manages to make a likable and plausible character out of a dramatist's stratagem." Leonard Maltin gave it three and a half of four stars: "Fine, literate adaptation of Philip Barry's play ... " Leslie Halliwell gave it three of four stars: "Elegant, highly successful remake ... still a stage play on film, but subtly devised to make the very most of the lines and performances."

Hepburn biographers have speculated that Johnny Case's plans to give up working did not appeal to Great Depression audiences who were struggling to find jobs. Hepburn, at the time, had earned a reputation as box-office poison, causing her departure from RKO Pictures, but critics claimed the Holiday marked her comeback: "If she [Hepburn] is slipping, as Independent Theatre Owners claim, then her 'Linda' should prove that she can come back--and has."

Holiday was the third of four films starring Grant and Hepburn, the others being Sylvia Scarlett (1935), Bringing Up Baby (1938), and The Philadelphia Story (1940).

Time Out London referred to Holiday as "one of Cukor's best films".

== Awards and honors ==
The film was nominated for an Academy Award for Best Art Direction by Stephen Goosson and Lionel Banks.

== Adaptations ==
Holiday was presented on radio on Screen Guild Theater on November 13, 1944.

An adaptation of Holiday, set in 2020, was presented by the Goodman Theatre in Chicago in 2026.

== Home media ==
This film has been released on Blu-ray as part of The Criterion Collection.
