= The Philadelphia Story (film) =

1940 film by George Cukor

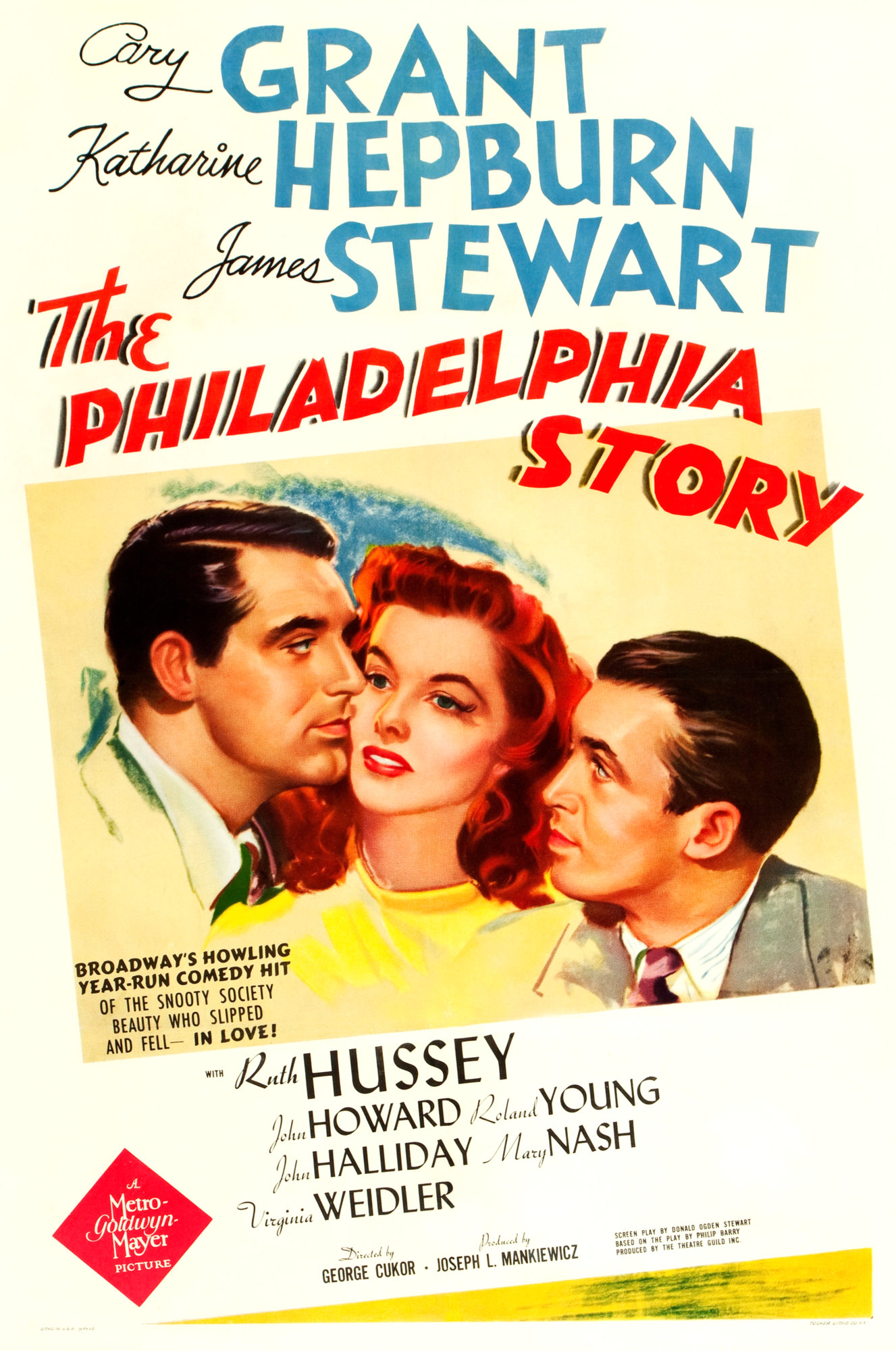
- Theatrical poster
- Directed by: George Cukor
- Screenplay by: Donald Ogden Stewart
- Based on: The Philadelphia Story by Philip Barry
- Produced by: Joseph L. Mankiewicz
- Starring: Cary Grant; Katharine Hepburn; James Stewart; Ruth Hussey; John Howard; Roland Young; John Halliday; Mary Nash; Virginia Weidler
- Cinematography: Joseph Ruttenberg
- Edited by: Frank Sullivan
- Music by: Franz Waxman
- Production company: Metro-Goldwyn-Mayer
- Distributed by: Loew's, Inc.
- Release dates: December 26, 1940 (New York City); January 17, 1941 (US)
- Running time: 112 minutes
- Country: United States
- Language: English
- Budget: $914,000
- Box office: $3.3 million

The Philadelphia Story is a 1940 American romantic comedy film starring Cary Grant, Katharine Hepburn, James Stewart, and Ruth Hussey. Directed by George Cukor, the film is based on the 1939 Broadway play of the same name by Philip Barry about a socialite whose wedding plans are complicated by the simultaneous arrival of her ex-husband and a tabloid magazine journalist. The socialite, played by Hepburn in both productions, was inspired by Helen Hope Montgomery Scott (1904–1995), a Philadelphia heiress who had married Barry's friend.

Written for the screen by Donald Ogden Stewart and an uncredited Waldo Salt, it is considered among the best examples of a comedy of remarriage, in which a couple divorce, flirt with outsiders and then remarry. The genre was popular in the 1930s and 1940s at a time when divorce was considered scandalous and the depiction of extramarital affairs was blocked by the Production Code.

The film was Hepburn's first success following several failures that caused her placement on a 1938 list of actors considered to be "box-office poison" compiled by theater owner Harry Brandt. Hepburn starred in the play and acquired the film rights, with the help of Howard Hughes, to control it as a vehicle for her screen comeback.

Nominated for six Academy Awards, including Outstanding Production (Best Picture), the film won two: Best Actor (Stewart) and Best Adapted Screenplay. MGM remade the film in 1956 as a musical retitled High Society, starring Bing Crosby, Grace Kelly, and Frank Sinatra.

The Philadelphia Story was produced by Joseph L. Mankiewicz and was selected for preservation in the United States National Film Registry in 1995.

== Plot ==
Tracy Lord is the elder daughter of a wealthy Philadelphia Main Line socialite family. She was married to C.K. Dexter Haven, a yacht designer and member of her social set, but divorced him two years prior because, according to her father, he does not meet the standards that she sets for all her friends and family. She is soon to marry the wealthy George Kittredge.

In New York, Spy magazine publisher Sidney Kidd is eager to cover the wedding and assigns reporter Mike Connor and photographer Liz Imbrie. Kidd intends to use the assistance of Dexter, who has been working for Spy in South America. Dexter tells Kidd that he will introduce them as friends of Tracy's brother Junius, a diplomat in Argentina. Tracy is not fooled, but Dexter tells her that Kidd has threatened her family's reputation with an innuendo-laden article about her father's affair with a dancer. Tracy deeply resents her father's infidelity, which has prompted her parents to live separately. Nonetheless, to protect her family's reputation, she agrees to let Mike and Liz stay and cover her wedding.

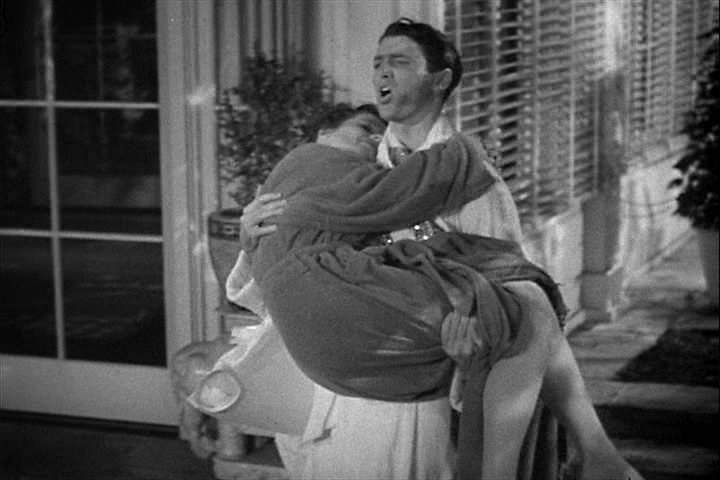
Mike carries Tracy into the house after a midnight dip.

Dexter is welcomed by Tracy's mother Margaret and teenaged sister Dinah, much to Tracy's frustration. She soon discovers that Mike has admirable qualities and finds his book of short stories in the library. As the wedding nears, she finds herself torn between George, Dexter, and Mike.

The night before the wedding, Tracy becomes drunk, kisses Mike, and takes an innocent midnight swim with him. When George observes Mike carrying Tracy into the house afterward, he assumes the worst. The next day, George tells her that he was shocked and feels entitled to an explanation before proceeding with the wedding. She admits to having no excuse and realizes that he does not really know her and has loved her as an idealized, perfect angel, so she cancels the engagement.

Tracy realizes that the guests have arrived and are waiting for the wedding ceremony to begin. Mike quickly volunteers to marry her, but she graciously declines because she perceives that Liz is in love with him. Dexter then offers to remarry her, and she gladly accepts.

== Cast ==
- Cary Grant as C.K. Dexter Haven
- Katharine Hepburn as Tracy Samantha Lord
- James Stewart as Macaulay "Mike" Connor
- Ruth Hussey as Elizabeth "Liz" Imbrie
- John Howard as George Kittredge
- Roland Young as William Q. Tracy (Uncle Willie)
- John Halliday as Seth Lord
- Mary Nash as Margaret Lord
- Virginia Weidler as Diana "Dinah" Lord
- Henry Daniell as Sidney Kidd
- Lionel Pape as Edward, a footman
- Rex Evans as Thomas, the butler
- David Clyde as Mac, the night watchman (uncredited)
- Hilda Plowright as the Librarian (uncredited)

== Production ==
"Everyone had enormous fun on the movie. The days and nights were sweltering that summer of 1940, but nobody cared. Cary got along very well with Kate Hepburn. She enjoyed him pushing her through a doorway in one scene (so she fell over backward) so much that she had him do it to her over and over again. There was a scene in which she had to throw Cary out the door of a house, bag and baggage, and she did it so vigorously he fell over and was bruised. As he stood up, looking rueful, Kate said, "That'll serve you right, Cary, for trying to be your own stuntman."

— Cameraman Joseph Ruttenberg, recalling The Philadelphia Story (1940).

Broadway playwright Philip Barry wrote the play specifically for Hepburn, who financially supported the play and declined a salary in return for a percentage of the profits. Her costars were Joseph Cotten as Dexter Haven, Van Heflin as Mike Connor, and Shirley Booth as Liz Imbrie.

The original play, starring Hepburn, ran for 417 performances.

Hepburn had hoped to create a film vehicle for herself that would erase the label of "box-office poison" that she had acquired after a number of commercial failures (such as Bringing Up Baby). Howard Hughes purchased the film rights for the play and gave them to her. Hepburn then sold the rights to MGM's Louis B. Mayer for $250,000 and the power of final approval of the film's producer, director, screenwriter, and cast.

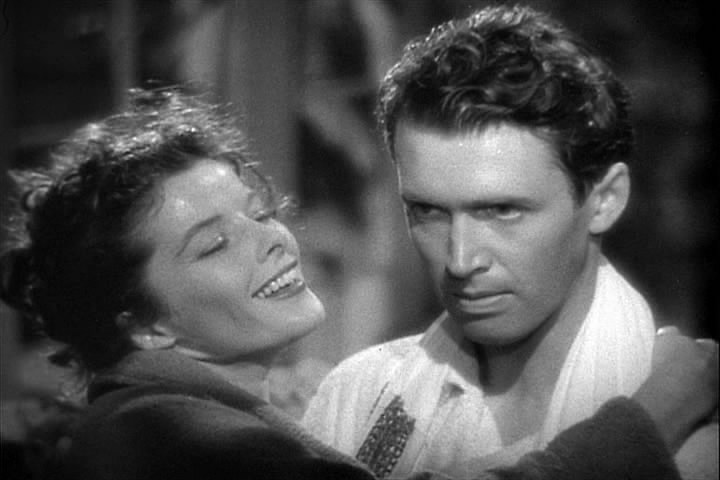
Hepburn as Tracy Lord and Stewart as Mike Connor

Hepburn selected director George Cukor, with whom she had worked for A Bill of Divorcement (1932) and Little Women (1933), and Barry's friend Donald Ogden Stewart, a writer experienced with adapting plays to the screen. Stewart, who won an Oscar for the script, said, "getting an Oscar for The Philadelphia Story was the easiest Oscar you could imagine. All you had to do was get out of the way." He wrote the script while listening to a tape recording of a live performance of the play to ensure that he preserved the lines that received the most laughter.

Hepburn wanted Clark Gable to play Dexter Haven and Spencer Tracy to play Mike Connor, but both had other commitments. The pairing of Cukor and Gable might have been problematic in any case, as they had clashed during the filming of the recent Gone with the Wind, with Cukor replaced by Gable's friend Victor Fleming. Grant agreed to play the part only if he were afforded top billing and that his salary would be $137,000, which he donated to the British War Relief Society.

According to the documentary MGM: When the Lion Roars, after Mayer purchased the film rights, he was skeptical about Hepburn's box-office appeal and took the unusual precaution of engaging two top male stars (Grant and Stewart) to support Hepburn.

The film was in production from July 5 to August 14, 1940, five days under schedule, at MGM's studios in Culver City. The art director was Cedric Gibbons, and the costume designer was Adrian.

== Reception ==
=== Release ===
Theatrical trailer

The film premiered in New York City on December 26, 1940, and was shown in select theaters in December, but MGM had agreed to hold its general release until January 1941 to avoid competition with the stage play that was touring the country. It entered general American release on January 17, 1941. It broke a box-office record at Radio City Music Hall by earning $600,000 in just six weeks.

According to MGM records, the film earned $2,374,000 in the U.S. and Canada, and $885,000 elsewhere, resulting in a profit of $1,272,000.

=== Critical reception ===
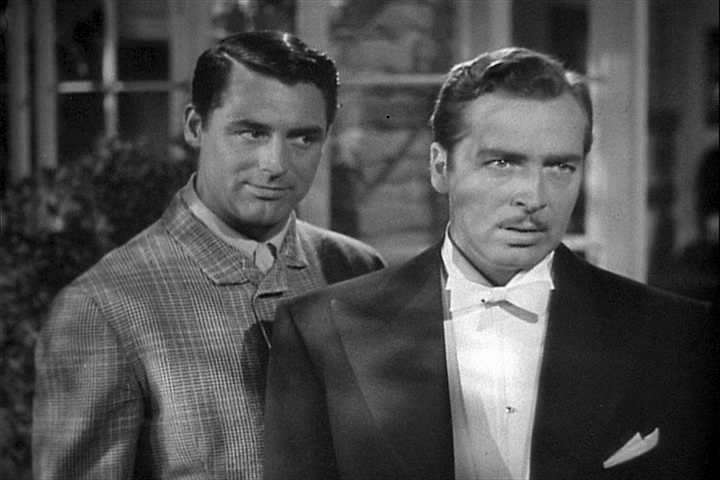
Grant as C.K. Dexter Haven, and John Howard as George Kittredge

Writing for The New York Times in 1940, Bosley Crowther wrote that the film "has just about everything that a blue-chip comedy should have—a witty, romantic script derived by Donald Ogden Stewart out of Philip Barry's successful play; the flavor of high-society elegance, in which the patrons invariably luxuriate; and a splendid cast of performers headed by Hepburn, Stewart, and Grant. If it doesn't play out this year and well along into next, they should turn the Music Hall into a shooting gallery ... Metro and Director George Cukor have graciously made it apparent, in the words of a character, that one of 'the prettiest sights in this pretty world is the privileged classes enjoying their privileges'. And so, in this instance, will you, too."

LIFE named The Philadelphia Story its film of the week in January 1941, describing it as "among the best funny pictures" of the year.

The film has a 100% rating on Rotten Tomatoes based on 103 reviews, with an average rating of 9.1/10. The consensus reads: "Offering a wonderfully witty script, spotless direction from George Cukor, and typically excellent lead performances, The Philadelphia Story is an unqualified classic." Rotten Tomatoes has also ranked it as the best romantic comedy of all time. Metacritic, which uses a weighted average, assigned the film a score of 96 out of 100, based on 13 critics, indicating "universal acclaim".

The film was the last of four starring Grant and Hepburn following Sylvia Scarlett (1935), Bringing Up Baby (1938), and Holiday (1938).

=== Awards and nominations ===
The film was nominated for six Academy Awards, winning two (Best Actor and Best Screenplay). James Stewart did not expect to win and felt that the award was given to him as compensation for his role in Mr. Smith Goes to Washington the previous year. Stewart later provided his Oscar statue for use in his father's hardware store in Indiana, Pennsylvania, where it was displayed for many years.

Award	Category	Nominee(s)	Result	Ref.
Academy Awards	Outstanding Production	Metro-Goldwyn-Mayer	Nominated	
Academy Awards	Best Director	George Cukor	Nominated	
Academy Awards	Best Actor	James Stewart	Won	
Academy Awards	Best Actress	Katharine Hepburn	Nominated	
Academy Awards	Best Supporting Actress	Ruth Hussey	Nominated	
Academy Awards	Best Screenplay	Donald Ogden Stewart	Won	
National Film Preservation Board	National Film Registry		Inducted	
New York Film Critics Circle Awards	Best Film		Nominated	
New York Film Critics Circle Awards	Best Actress	Katharine Hepburn	Won	
Online Film & Television Association Awards	Film Hall of Fame: Productions		Inducted	

The film was named the third-best of the year by The Film Daily.

In 1995, the film was deemed "culturally, historically, or aesthetically significant" by the Library of Congress and was selected for preservation in the United States National Film Registry.

The film was included in various American Film Institute lists:

- 1998: AFI's 100 Years...100 Movies – #51
- 2000: AFI's 100 Years...100 Laughs – #15
- 2002: AFI's 100 Years...100 Passions – #44
- 2007: AFI's 100 Years...100 Movies (10th Anniversary Edition) – #44
- 2008: AFI's 10 Top 10 – #5 Romantic Comedy Film

In 2006, Writers Guild of America West ranked its screenplay 37th in WGA’s list of 101 Greatest Screenplays.

== Adaptations ==
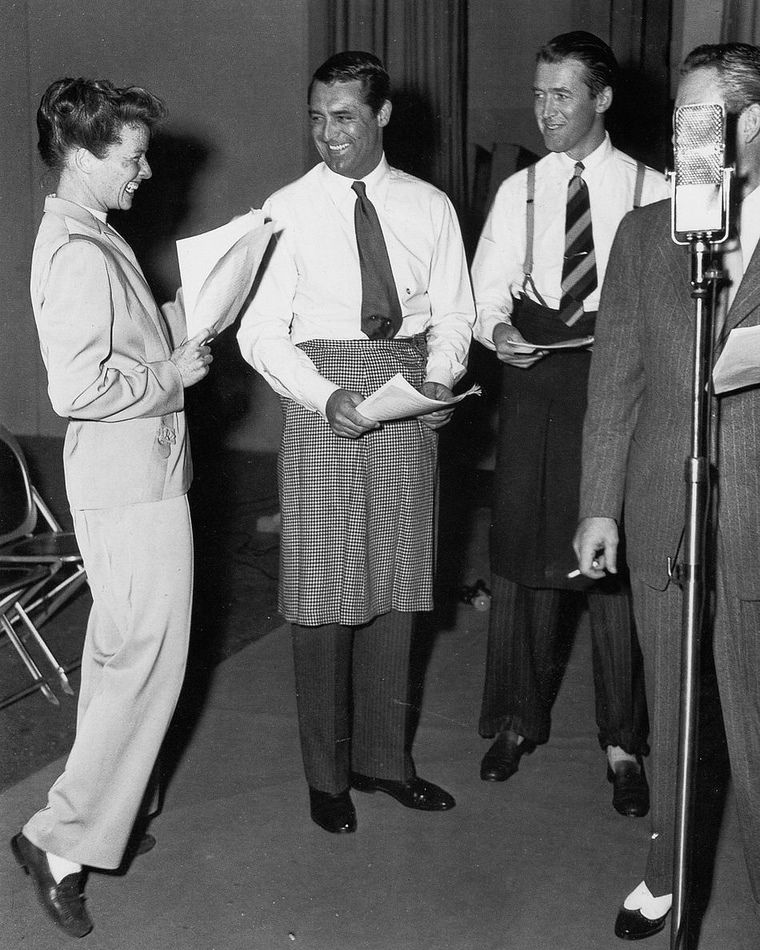
Hepburn, Grant and Stewart performed The Philadelphia Story for the Victory Theater radio program in 1947.

The stars of The Philadelphia Story appeared in a one-hour radio adaptation on the premiere episode of the Department of War's special Victory Theater summer series, airing on July 20, 1942. Lux Radio Theatre produced a second adaptation for its own use on June 14, 1943, starring Robert Taylor, Loretta Young, and Robert Young. The film was also adapted for two half-hour episodes of The Screen Guild Theater, first with Greer Garson, Henry Fonda, and Fred MacMurray (April 5, 1942), and then with Hepburn, Grant and Stewart reprising their film roles (March 17, 1947).

The film was adapted in 1956 as the MGM musical High Society, directed by Charles Walters and starring Bing Crosby, Grace Kelly, Frank Sinatra, Celeste Holm, and Louis Armstrong.

== In popular culture ==
In Radio Days, the main character watches the film at Radio City Music Hall with his family. The play is rehearsed in another Woody Allen film, Mighty Aphrodite. In Postcards from the Edge, two of the characters quote the film.

The final scene from the film is viewed by two characters in season seven, episode eight of Gilmore Girls, "Introducing Lorelai Planetarium". Another scene is viewed in season four, episode 14 of Gossip Girl, "While You Weren't Sleeping." In The Half of It (2020), two of the characters watch and discuss the movie.

Despite taking place in 1938, a character in Double Indemnity (1944) makes a reference to the title of the film and play.

== See also ==
- List of films with a 100% rating on Rotten Tomatoes, a film-review aggregator website
