= Holiday (1930 film) =

1930 film

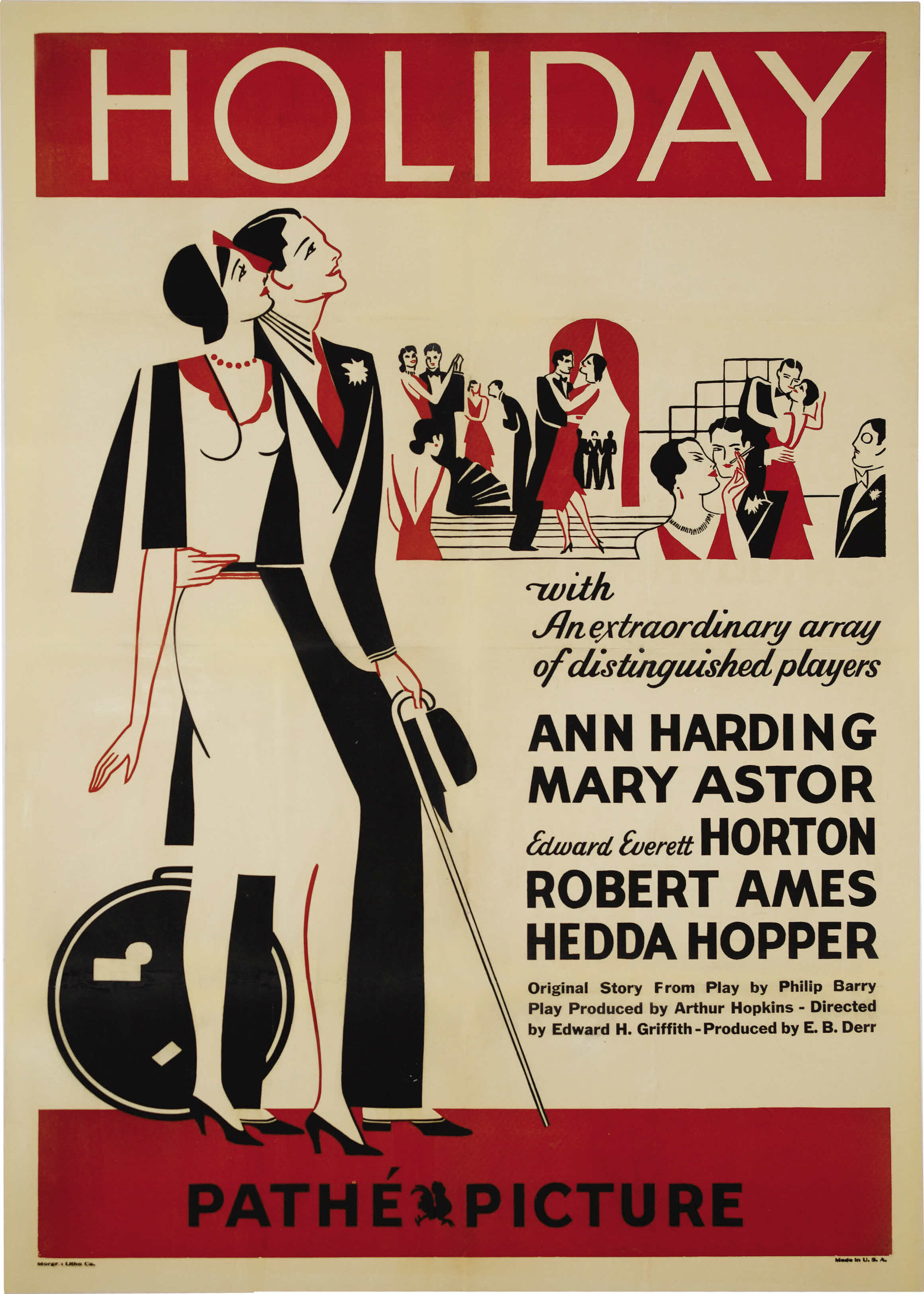
- Theatrical release poster
- Directed by: Edward H. Griffith
- Written by: Horace Jackson
- Based on: Holiday; 1928 play by Philip Barry
- Produced by: E. B. Derr
- Starring: Ann Harding; Mary Astor; Edward Everett Horton; Robert Ames; Hedda Hopper
- Cinematography: Norbert Brodine
- Edited by: Daniel Mandell
- Music by: Josiah Zuro
- Production company: Pathé Exchange
- Distributed by: Pathé Exchange
- Release date: July 3, 1930
- Running time: 98 minutes
- Country: United States
- Language: English

Holiday is a 1930 American pre-Code romantic comedy film which tells the story of a young man who is torn between his free-thinking lifestyle and the tradition of his wealthy fiancée's family. It stars Ann Harding, Mary Astor, Edward Everett Horton, Robert Ames and Hedda Hopper. It was produced and released by Pathé Exchange.

The film was adapted by Horace Jackson from the 1928 play by Philip Barry. It was directed by Edward H. Griffith.

== Plot ==
Holiday (1930)

== Cast ==
- Ann Harding as Linda Seton
- Mary Astor as Julia Seton
- Edward Everett Horton as Nick Potter
- Robert Ames as Johnny Case
- Hedda Hopper as Susan Potter
- Monroe Owsley as Ned Seton
- William Holden as Edward Seton
- Elizabeth Forrester as Laura
- Mabel Forrest as Mary Jessup
- Creighton Hale as Pete Hedges
- Hallam Cooley as Seton Cram
- Mary Forbes as Pritchard Ames

== Award nominations ==
It was nominated for Academy Awards for Best Actress in a Leading Role (Ann Harding) and Best Writing, Adaptation.

== Remake ==
The film was remade in 1938. Directed by George Cukor, it starred Katharine Hepburn and Cary Grant, with Horton reprising his role as Professor Nick Potter from the 1930 version.
