= Philip Barry =

American playwright

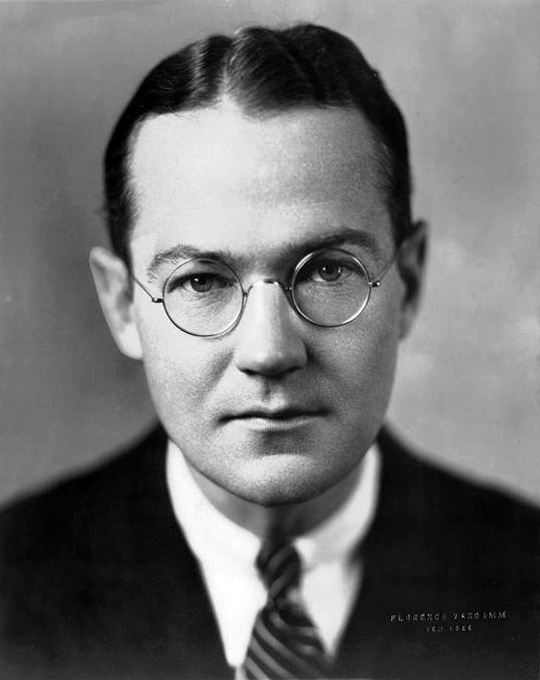
- Barry in 1928
- Born: June 18, 1896; Rochester, New York
- Died: December 3, 1949 (aged 53); New York City
- Occupation: Dramatist
- Writing career
- Genre: Theater

Philip Jerome Quinn Barry (June 18, 1896 – December 3, 1949) was an American dramatist best known for his plays Holiday (1928) and The Philadelphia Story (1939), which were both made into films starring Katharine Hepburn and Cary Grant.

== Biography ==
=== Early life ===
Philip Barry was born on June 18, 1896, in Rochester, New York, to James Corbett Barry and Mary Agnes Quinn Barry. James died of appendicitis a year after Philip's birth, and the family's marble-and-tile business faltered from then on. His oldest brother, Edmund, who was 16 at the time, left school to take over the business and became a father figure to Philip.

Barry's play The Youngest, written when he was 28, is an autobiographical account of his family history following his father's death. In 1910, at the age of 14, Barry discovered that a New York State interpretation of his father's will entitled him to a share of his father's estate that eventually left him the entire business. Family conflicts ensued; he later claimed he never intended to keep the money, and he eventually signed over the estate to his mother and brothers.

Because of his poor eyesight, Barry was rejected for military service during World War I, but he eventually found a wartime job deciphering cables at the U.S. Embassy in London and left Yale to assume his duties. At the end of the war, he returned to college, where he studied writing with Henry Seidel Canby, and earned his B.A. His mother and two elder brothers strongly demanded that he return to the family in Rochester after college and take a place in the family business. He was, however, determined to strike out on his own and, knowing that he wanted to be a writer, enrolled in George Pierce Baker's playwriting course "47 Workshop" at Harvard University. (Other alumni of Baker's course include Eugene O'Neill, Sidney Howard, S.N. Behrman, and Thomas Wolfe, as well as numerous critics, directors, and designers.)

=== Writing career ===
In 1919, when Barry returned from London, the Yale Dramatic Club staged his one-act play Autonomy. By the time he had enrolled in Baker's class at the end of the year, he was spending all his time writing plays. His first full-length play for the class was A Punch for Judy, written in the spring 1921. The Harvard workshop took the play on tour to Worcester, Massachusetts; Utica, New York; Buffalo, New York; Cleveland; and Columbus, Ohio, but it failed to win the backing of a New York producer. Playwright Robert E. Sherwood met Barry at this time and thought him an "exasperating young twirp". Sherwood would eventually become a good friend and colleague who came to appreciate what he termed Barry's "Irish, impish sense of comedy".

While still living in Cambridge, Barry became engaged to Ellen Semple but was determined to establish himself as a playwright before settling down. Ellen lived in New York while he remained in Cambridge, and there he wrote The Jilts, which reflected his own concern that marital obligations might thwart an artistic career and force him into the business world. The play won the Herndon Prize in 1922 as the best drama written in Baker's workshop. (On July 15, 1922, his doubts calmed, Barry and Semple were married, and their first son, Philip Semple Barry, was born the following year.)

Renamed You and I, the play opened on Broadway on February 19, 1923, and was a critical and commercial success. Barry's Broadway career was launched. Theater critic Brooks Atkinson wrote "If [his story of a businessman who gives up art for the sake of money and family] did not make Barry exactly a revolutionary, it made him a dissenter from the materialistic mythology of America. The story spoke to the tenor of the times, a decade that both glamorized and questioned the energetic pursuit of financial success. You and I ran for 170 performances, was followed by a successful tour and many productions in college and regional theaters, and was later included in Burns Mantle's Best Plays anthology series.

One person who was not happy with Barry's success was a classmate in Baker's seminar, Thomas Wolfe, who struggled to be a playwright before finding fame as a novelist. Wolfe was both envious of Barry's facility and quick rise and unforgiving about his barbed wit; Barry had written a play for their class about North Carolina bootleggers, parodying Wolfe, his background, and his stumbling efforts to write a play.

Barry's second work for the stage, The Youngest, was produced the following year to considerably less acclaim. The story dealt with a rich, provincial family who cannot accept the unconventional ways of one of its members. (This would eventually become a common Barry theme, handled more deftly in later plays.) Barry's third Broadway play, In a Garden (1925), served as a prototype for his classic comic works in which a gracious tone seems at odds with the often disturbing implications. In a Garden contains echoes of Luigi Pirandello and in its ending alludes to the famous final scene that concludes Ibsen's A Doll's House when Nora Helmer leaves her unsympathetic husband Torvald. The play also makes use of phallic symbolism and refers to Sigmund Freud's theories of the unconscious. Theater historians W. David Sievers and David C. Gild wrote that the play is an "innovative 'psychodrama' that enacts therapeutic Freudian techniques in a theatrical context," a method Barry employed in later plays such as Hotel Universe (1930) and Here Come the Clowns (1938). It featured a well-received performance by Laurette Taylor.

Even though he knew it "would probably ruin the man who produced it" because of its calculated departures from Broadway formulae, White Wings was produced in 1926. It was a complete failure. Seen as a precursor to Thornton Wilder's The Skin of Our Teeth, the play follows a group of proud street cleaners at the turn of the twentieth century; its theme is the increasing mechanization of life. Archie Inch, the protagonist, is caught between the "White Wings" (the men who clean up after horse-drawn carriages) and his sweetheart Mary Todd, who loves her father and the automobiles he designs which are a threat to the older way of life. In comparison to other plays of that era about the modern work force, such as Eugene O'Neill's The Hairy Ape and Dynamo, Elmer Rice's The Adding Machine, and the dramas of Ernst Toller and Georg Kaiser, Barry's was taken less seriously. It closed after 27 performances.

In 1927, a year after the birth of his second son, Jonathan Peter, Barry took his family to France. He lived in luxury on the Riviera for a year in a circle that included Scott and Zelda Fitzgerald, Gerald and Sara Murphy, Cole Porter, and Archibald MacLeish, and began work on two new plays. One of these plays, John, was not a success, lasting only several days. The plot dealt with events in the life of John the Baptist as he awaited the arrival of the Messiah. The writing was cited as being both grandiose and mundane, and the casting (with Yiddish actor Jacob Ben-Ami as John and British actress Constance Collier as Herodias) was strongly criticized. The second play, Paris Bound, a comedy about infidelity, opened a few weeks later and ran in New York for 234 performances. It became Barry's first major hit and, as it was picked up by theaters around the country, provided him with royalties for many years. Barry then strove to write a crowd-pleaser, Cock Robin (1928), with Elmer Rice, whom he had met on his European trip en route to Cannes. That play ran for only 100 performances.

Holiday (1928), a comedy which ran for 230 performances, was far more popular with critics and audiences and is considered to be one of Barry's best depictions of an affluent American family and its confrontation with less convention-bound values. The New Yorker writer Brendan Gill called it "a kindly comedy, whose precepts are Barry's own." It was filmed twice, first in 1930, when it garnered an Academy Award nomination for actress Ann Harding, and then, notably, in a 1938 version by George Cukor starring Katharine Hepburn as the elder daughter of a stiff-necked wealthy businessman and Cary Grant as the younger daughter's quirky, charismatic suitor who plans to leave his job in finance for the titular event, a chance to figure out his true calling, rather spend his entire life on Wall Street. The play was revived on Broadway in 1973 and 1995 and often was performed in regional theaters through the late 20th century.

Barry's was not a smooth career. Hotel Universe (1930) lasted for only eighty-one performances and added to the financial woes of the Theatre Guild, the famed organization of which Barry was an original member. Set in a villa in southern France based on the home of the famous expatriates Gerald and Sara Murphy, Hotel Universe tells the story of six unhappy characters in search of meaning, if not an author, though in effect they find one in Stephen Field, the aging invalid whose lonely daughter, Ann, they have all come to visit. When Field arrives in the later half of the play, the suicidal disillusionment, dark pasts, and unresolved issues of the other characters emerge. Each visitor begins to act out roles based on past traumas. In the view of theater historian Eleanor Flexner, the play's psychologizing and philosophizing are "little more than a jaunt to a Never-Never land." Other students of Barry's work consider it his most unjustly underrated play.

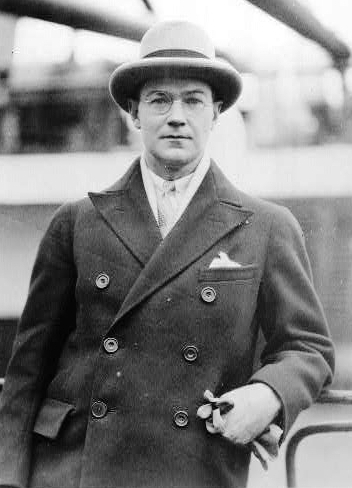
Barry in 1931

Tomorrow and Tomorrow was produced in 1931 and compared favorably to Eugene O'Neill's Strange Interlude. The story concerns Eve Redman, the young wife of a businessman whose grandfather founded the college in the Indiana town where the Redmans live. Dr. Nicholas Hay, a young psychologist and visitor from out of town, lectures at the college, advocating education for women, an opportunity Eve seizes. He teaches her the "science of the emotions," and her outlook evolves. They fall in love and eventually produce the child that Eve has always longed for, the one that her husband cannot give her. Her husband believes the child is his. For its time, the story was regarded as daring and sophisticated, and the screen rights were sold for a staggering $85,000.

Though remembered today for his vintage "comedies of manners" playfully skewering the rich and fashionable, Barry (a practicing Roman Catholic whose sister was a nun) wrote many serious dramas, often on religious themes. Brooks Atkinson, noting this dichotomy between the successful, high-living Broadway playwright of light fare and the serious-minded writer, wrote of Barry that, at heart, "[he] liked the role of prophet; he was attracted to moralistic themes about mankind." His 1927 play John is a New Testament story, and Barry described his 1938 allegory Here Come the Clowns as a study of "the battle with evil" in which his hero, Clancy, "at last finds God in the will of man." The Joyous Season (1934) is an admiring portrait of a strong-willed nun who has devoted her life to her faith. (The Joyous Season starred Lillian Gish in its original production and Ethel Barrymore in a 1946 Chicago revival that did not do well enough at the box office to bring it to New York, despite the many parish priests in Chicago who urged their parishioners to see it.)

Barry's best-known, most frequently revived work is The Philadelphia Story (1939), which was made into a 1940 film starring Katharine Hepburn, Cary Grant, and James Stewart. Hepburn, a close friend of Barry, had appeared in the play on Broadway, but she had doubts about its commercial possibilities and, proven wrong by its box-office success, bought the movie rights with the help of her ex-boyfriend Howard Hughes. She successfully restarted her previously flagging Hollywood career with the film version. The movie was remade as High Society, starring Frank Sinatra, Bing Crosby, Grace Kelly and Louis Armstrong. The popular play ran for 417 performances on Broadway.

In 1949 at the age of 53, Barry died of a heart attack in his family apartment on Park Avenue. "It was his misfortune", Atkinson wrote, "to be at the peak of his powers during a skeptical age that resisted moral instruction". He also noted a fundamental conservatism and didacticism in Barry: "Although Barry's literary style was modern, his mind was closer to Langdon Mitchell than to S.N. Behrman."

== Plays ==
- Autonomy (1919)
- A Punch for Judy (1921)
- You and I (1923), filmed in 1931 as The Bargain
- The Youngest (1924)
- In a Garden (1925)
- White Wings (1926), adapted as an opera by Douglas Moore, premiered in 1935
- John (1927)
- Paris Bound (1927), filmed in 1929 by Edward H. Griffith
- Holiday (1928), filmed in 1930 by Edward H. Griffith and in 1938 by George Cukor
- Cock Robin (with Elmer Rice) (1928), filmed as Who Killed Cock Robin? in 1938
- Hotel Universe (1930)
- Tomorrow and Tomorrow (1931), filmed in 1932 by Richard Wallace
- The Animal Kingdom (1932) filmed in 1932 by Edward H. Griffith and as One More Tomorrow in 1946 by Peter Godfrey
- The Joyous Season (1934)
- Bright Star (1935)
- Spring Dance (1936), filmed as Spring Madness in 1938 by S. Sylvan Simon
- Here Come the Clowns (1938)
- The Philadelphia Story (1939), filmed in 1940 by George Cukor and as High Society by Charles Walters in 1956
- Liberty Jones (1941)
- Without Love (1942), filmed in 1945 by Harold S. Bucquet
- Foolish Notion (1945)
- My Name is Aquilon (1949), adapted from Jean-Pierre Aumont's play
- Second Threshold (1951), completed by Robert Sherwood
