= Comedy of remarriage =

Film genre

The comedy of remarriage is a subgenre of American comedy films of the 1930s and 1940s. At the time, the Production Code, also known as the Hays Code, banned any explicit references to or attempts to justify adultery and illicit sex. The comedy of remarriage with the same spouse enabled filmmakers to evade this provision of the Code. The protagonists divorced, flirted, or even had relationships, with strangers without risking the wrath of censorship, and then got back together.

The genre was given its name by the philosopher Stanley Cavell in a series of academic articles that later became a 1981 book, Pursuits of Happiness: The Hollywood Comedy of Remarriage. Cavell argues that the genre represented Hollywood's crowning achievement, and that beneath all the slapstick and innuendo is a serious effort to create a new basis for marriage centered on mutual love – religious and economic necessity no longer applying for much of the American middle class.

In response to Cavell's article, scholar David R. Shumway claims it is possible "to make too much of the remarriage 'genre'". He points out that "only two of Cavell's seven comedies deal with characters who we actually see interacting as husband and wife for any length of time" and points out that all seven films fit into the screwball comedy genre.

More recently, film critics A. O. Scott and David Edelstein both argued that Eternal Sunshine of the Spotless Mind was a 21st-century example of the genre. The 2025 film Is This Thing On? has also been described as a comedy of remarriage.

== Notable comedies of remarriage ==
(Bold text denotes inclusion in Pursuits of Happiness)

- **It Happened One Night** (1934), directed by Frank Capra, starring Clark Gable and Claudette Colbert
- Theodora Goes Wild (1936), directed by Richard Boleslawski, starring Irene Dunne and Melvyn Douglas
- **The Awful Truth** (1937), directed by Leo McCarey, starring Cary Grant and Irene Dunne
- Second Honeymoon (1937), directed by Walter Lang, starring Tyrone Power and Loretta Young
- **Bringing Up Baby** (1938), directed by Howard Hawks, starring Cary Grant and Katharine Hepburn
- **The Philadelphia Story** (1940), directed by George Cukor, starring Cary Grant and Katharine Hepburn
- **His Girl Friday** (1940), directed by Howard Hawks, starring Cary Grant and Rosalind Russell
- My Favorite Wife (1940), directed by Garson Kanin, starring Cary Grant and Irene Dunne
- Love Crazy (1941), directed by Jack Conway, starring Myrna Loy and William Powell
- **The Lady Eve** (1941), directed by Preston Sturges, starring Barbara Stanwyck and Henry Fonda
- Mr. and Mrs. Smith (1941), directed by Alfred Hitchcock, starring Carole Lombard and Robert Montgomery
- That Uncertain Feeling (1941), directed by Ernst Lubitsch, starring Melvyn Douglas and Merle Oberon
- Bedtime Story (1941), directed by Alexander Hall, starring Fredric March and Loretta Young
- The Palm Beach Story (1942), directed by Preston Sturges, starring Claudette Colbert and Joel McCrea
- Woman of the Year (1942), directed by George Stevens, starring Spencer Tracy and Katharine Hepburn
- **Adam's Rib** (1949), directed by George Cukor, starring Spencer Tracy and Katharine Hepburn
- We're Not Married! (1952), directed by Edmund Goulding, starring Ginger Rogers, Fred Allen, Victor Moore, Marilyn Monroe, David Wayne, Eve Arden, Paul Douglas, Eddie Bracken, and Mitzi Gaynor.
- Phffft! (1954), directed by Mark Robson, starring Judy Holliday and Jack Lemmon
- Marriage on the Rocks (1965), directed by Jack Donohue, starring Frank Sinatra and Deborah Kerr
- What's Up, Doc? (1972), directed by Peter Bogdanovich, starring Barbra Streisand and Ryan O'Neal
