= Screwball comedy =

Genre of comedy film

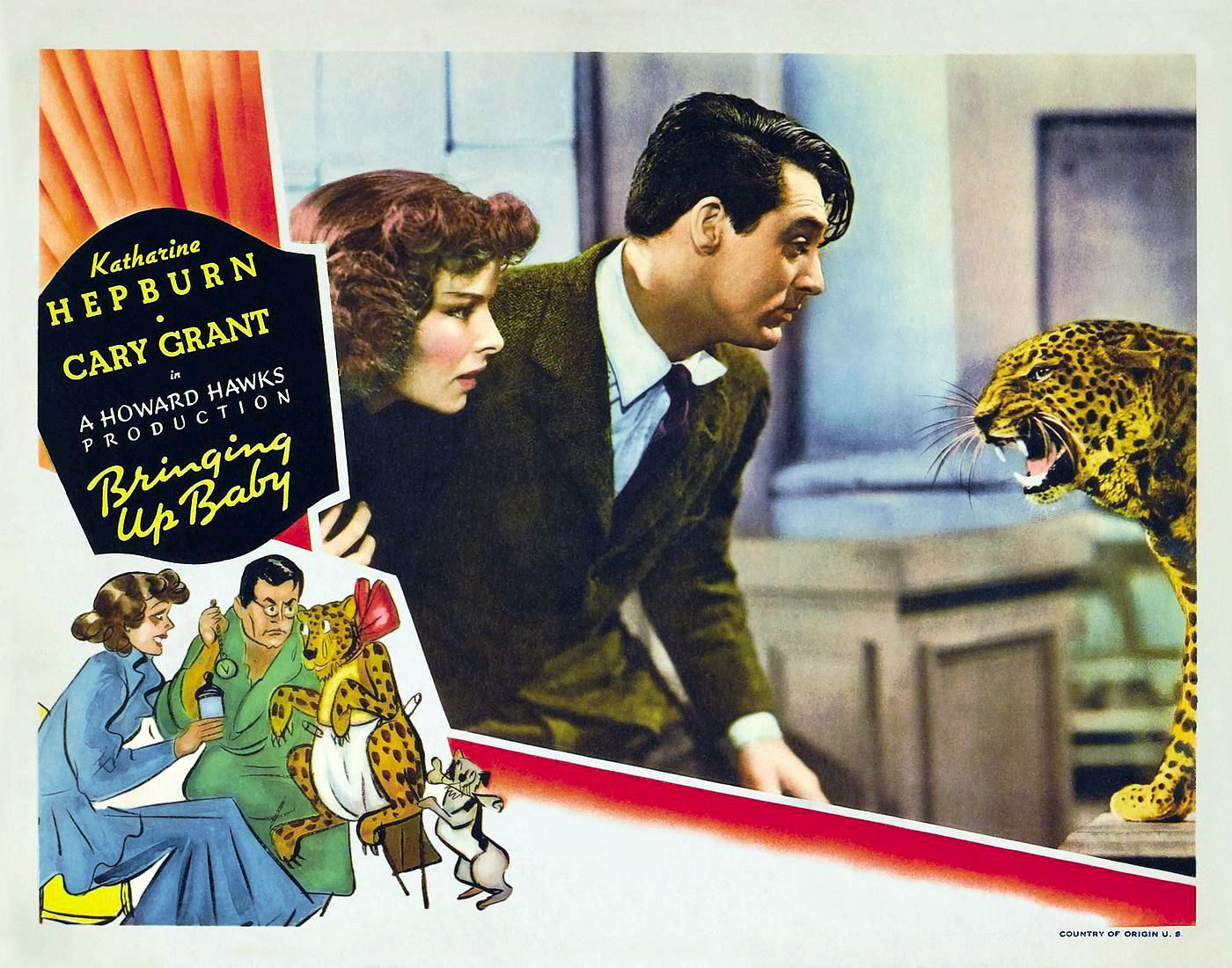
Bringing Up Baby (1938) is a screwball comedy from the genre's classic period.

Screwball comedy is a film subgenre of the romantic comedy genre that became popular during the Great Depression, beginning in the early 1930s and thriving until the early 1950s, that satirizes the traditional love story. It has secondary characteristics similar to film noir, distinguished by a female character who dominates the relationship with the male central character, whose masculinity is challenged, and the two engaging in a humorous battle of the sexes. Usually, the masculine part loses this battle.

The genre also featured romantic attachments between members of different social classes, as in It Happened One Night (1934) and My Man Godfrey (1936).

What sets the screwball comedy apart from the generic romantic comedy is that "screwball comedy puts the emphasis on a funny spoofing of love, while the more traditional romantic comedy ultimately accents love." Other elements of the screwball comedy include fast-paced, overlapping repartee, farcical situations, escapist themes, physical battle of the sexes, disguise and masquerade, and plot lines involving courtship and marriage. Some comic plays are also described as screwball comedies.

== Origins of the Genre Name ==
Screwball comedy gets its name from the screwball, a type of breaking pitch in baseball and fastpitch softball that moves in the opposite direction from all other breaking pitches. These features of the screwball pitch also describe the dynamics between the lead characters in screwball comedy films. According to Gehring (2002):

Still, screwball comedy probably drew its name from the term's entertainingly unorthodox use in the national pastime. Before the term's application in 1930s film criticism, "screwball" had been used in baseball to describe both an oddball player and "any pitched ball that moves in an unusual or unexpected way." Obviously, these characteristics also describe performers in screwball comedy films, from oddball Carole Lombard to the unusual or unexpected movement of Katharine Hepburn in Bringing Up Baby (1938). As with the crazy period antics in baseball, screwball comedy uses nutty behavior as a prism through which to view a topsy-turvy period in American history.

== History ==
Screwball comedy has proved to be a popular and enduring film genre. Three-Cornered Moon (1933), starring Claudette Colbert, is often credited as the first true screwball, though Bombshell starring Jean Harlow followed it in the same year. Although many film scholars agree that its classic period had effectively ended by 1942, elements of the genre have persisted or have been paid homage to in later films. Other film scholars argue that the screwball comedy lives on.

During the Great Depression, there was a general demand for films with a strong social class critique and hopeful, escapist-oriented themes. The screwball format arose largely due to the major film studios' desire to avoid censorship by the increasingly enforced Hays Code. Filmmakers resorted to handling these elements covertly to incorporate prohibited risqué elements into their plots. The verbal sparring between the sexes served as a stand-in for physical and sexual tension. Though some film scholars, such as William K. Everson, argue that "screwball comedies were not so much rebelling against the Production Code as they were attacking – and ridiculing – the dull, lifeless respectability that the Code insisted on for family viewing."

The screwball comedy has close links with the theatrical genre of farce, and some comic plays are also described as screwball comedies. Other genres with which screwball comedy is associated include slapstick, situation comedy, romantic comedy and bedroom farce.

== Characteristics ==
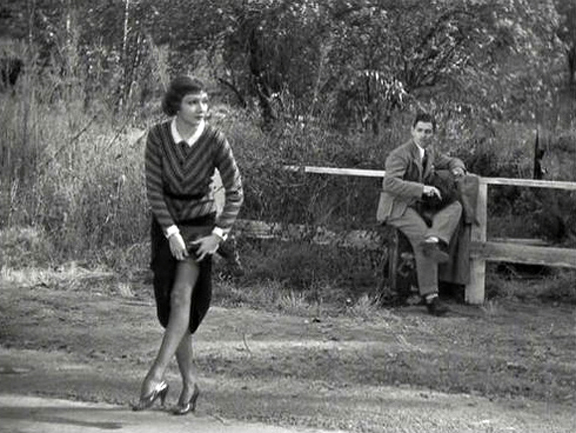
A still from a trailer for It Happened One Night

Films that are definitive of the genre usually feature farcical situations, a combination of slapstick and fast-paced repartee, and show the struggle between economic classes. They also generally feature a self-confident and often stubborn central female protagonist and a plot involving courtship, marriage, or remarriage. These traits can be seen in both It Happened One Night (1934) and My Man Godfrey (1936). The film critic Andrew Sarris has defined the screwball comedy as "a sex comedy without the sex."

Like farce, screwball comedies often involve masquerades and disguises in which a character or characters resort to secrecy. Sometimes screwball comedies feature male characters cross-dressing, further contributing to elements of masquerade (Bringing Up Baby (1938), Love Crazy (1941), I Was a Male War Bride (1949), and Some Like It Hot (1959)). At first, the couple seems mismatched and even hostile to each other, but eventually overcome their differences amusingly or entertainingly, leading to romance. Often, this mismatch comes about when the man is of a lower social class than the woman (It Happened One Night (1934), Bringing Up Baby and Holiday, both 1938). The woman often plans the final romantic union from the outset, and the man is seemingly oblivious to this. In Bringing Up Baby, the woman tells a third party: "He's the man I'm going to marry. He doesn't know it, but I am."

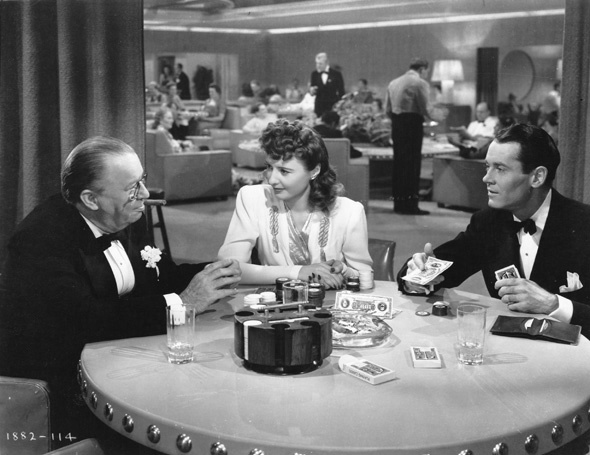
In The Lady Eve, Jean (center, played by Barbara Stanwyck) passes herself off as an upper-class woman.

These pictures also offered a cultural escape valve: a safe battleground to explore serious issues such as class under a comedic and non-threatening framework. Class issues are a strong component of screwball comedies: the upper class is represented as idle, pampered, and having difficulty coping with the real world. By contrast, when lower-class people attempt to pass themselves off as upper class or otherwise insinuate themselves into high society, they can do so with relative ease (The Lady Eve, 1941; My Man Godfrey, 1936). Some critics believe that the portrayal of the upper class in It Happened One Night was brought about by the Great Depression, and the financially struggling moviegoing public's desire to see the upper class taught a lesson in humanity.

Another common element of the screwball comedy is fast-talking, witty repartee, such as in You Can't Take It with You (1938) and His Girl Friday (1940). This stylistic device did not originate in the genre: it is also found in many of the old Hollywood cycles, including gangster films and traditional romantic comedies.

Screwball comedies also tend to contain ridiculous, farcical situations, such as in Bringing Up Baby, where a couple must take care of a pet leopard during much of the film. Slapstick elements are also frequently present, such as the numerous pratfalls Henry Fonda takes in The Lady Eve (1941).

One subgenre of screwball is known as the comedy of remarriage, in which characters divorce and then remarry one another, such as: The Ex-Mrs. Bradford (1936),The Awful Truth (1937), His Girl Friday (1940), The Philadelphia Story (1940). Some scholars point to this frequent device as evidence of the shift in the American moral code, as it showed freer attitudes toward divorce (though the divorce always turns out to have been a mistake, as seen in His Girl Friday: "You've got an old fashioned idea divorce is something that lasts forever, 'til death do us part.' Why divorce doesn't mean anything nowadays, Hildy, just a few words mumbled over you by a judge.")

Another subgenre of screwball comedy is the woman chasing a man who is oblivious to or uninterested in her. Examples include Barbara Stanwyck chasing Henry Fonda (The Lady Eve, 1941); Sonja Henie chasing John Payne (Sun Valley Serenade, 1941, and Iceland, 1942); Marion Davies chasing Antonio Moreno (The Cardboard Lover, 1928); Marion Davies chasing Bing Crosby (Going Hollywood, 1933); and Carole Lombard chasing William Powell (My Man Godfrey, 1936).

The philosopher Stanley Cavell has noted that many classic screwball comedies turn on an interlude in the state of Connecticut (Bringing Up Baby, The Lady Eve, The Awful Truth). In Christmas in Connecticut (1945), the action moves to Connecticut and remains there for the duration of the film. New York City is also featured in a lot of screwball comedies, which critics have noted may be because of the economic diversity of the city and the ability to contrast different social classes during the Great Depression. The screwball comedies It Happened One Night (1934) and The Palm Beach Story (1942) also feature characters traveling to and from Florida by train. Trains, another staple of screwball comedies and romantic comedies from the era, are also featured prominently in Design for Living (1934), Twentieth Century (1934) and Vivacious Lady (1938).

== Examples from the classic period ==
Year	Title	Director	Stars	Ref
1928	The Patsy	King Vidor	Marion Davies, Marie Dressler, and Lawrence Gray	
1931	Platinum Blonde	Frank Capra	Loretta Young, Robert Williams and Jean Harlow	
1931	The Front Page (remade as His Girl Friday (1940))	Lewis Milestone	Adolphe Menjou and Pat O'Brien	
1932	Trouble in Paradise	Ernst Lubitsch	Miriam Hopkins, Kay Francis, and Herbert Marshall	
1933	Three-Cornered Moon	Elliott Nugent	Claudette Colbert and Richard Arlen	
1933	Bombshell	Victor Fleming	Jean Harlow and Lee Tracy	
1934	Design for Living	Ernst Lubitsch	Fredric March, Gary Cooper and Miriam Hopkins	
1934	It Happened One Night	Frank Capra	Clark Gable and Claudette Colbert	
1934	Twentieth Century	Howard Hawks	John Barrymore and Carole Lombard	
1934	The Richest Girl in the World	William A. Seiter	Miriam Hopkins, Joel McCrea, and Fay Wray	
1935	Hands Across the Table	Mitchell Leisen	Carole Lombard, Fred MacMurray and Ralph Bellamy	
1935	She Couldn't Take It	Tay Garnett	George Raft and Joan Bennett	
1935	If You Could Only Cook	William A. Seiter	Herbert Marshall and Jean Arthur	
1936	Mr. Deeds Goes to Town	Frank Capra	Gary Cooper and Jean Arthur	
1936	The Ex-Mrs. Bradford	Stephen Roberts	William Powell and Jean Arthur	
1936	My Man Godfrey	Gregory La Cava	William Powell and Carole Lombard	
1936	Cain and Mabel	Lloyd Bacon	Marion Davies and Clark Gable	
1936	Libeled Lady	Jack Conway	Jean Harlow, William Powell, Myrna Loy, and Spencer Tracy	
1936	Theodora Goes Wild	Richard Boleslawski	Irene Dunne and Melvyn Douglas	
1936	Love on the Run	W. S. Van Dyke	Joan Crawford and Clark Gable	
1937	Love Is News	Tay Garnett	Tyrone Power, Loretta Young, and Don Ameche	
1937	Easy Living	Mitchell Leisen	Jean Arthur, Edward Arnold and Ray Milland	
1937	Topper	Norman Z. McLeod	Constance Bennett and Cary Grant	
1937	The Awful Truth	Leo McCarey	Irene Dunne, Cary Grant and Ralph Bellamy	
1937	Double Wedding	Richard Thorpe	William Powell and Myrna Loy	
1937	Nothing Sacred	William A. Wellman	Carole Lombard and Fredric March	
1937	True Confession	Wesley Ruggles	Carole Lombard, Fred MacMurray and John Barrymore	
1938	The Divorce of Lady X	Tim Whelan	Merle Oberon and Laurence Olivier	
1938	Merrily We Live	Norman Z. McLeod	Constance Bennett and Brian Aherne	
1938	Bringing Up Baby	Howard Hawks	Katharine Hepburn and Cary Grant	
1938	Bluebeard's Eighth Wife	Ernst Lubitsch	Claudette Colbert and Gary Cooper	
1938	Joy of Living	Tay Garnett	Irene Dunne and Douglas Fairbanks Jr.	
1938	Vivacious Lady	George Stevens	Ginger Rogers and James Stewart	
1938	Holiday	George Cukor	Katharine Hepburn and Cary Grant	
1938	You Can't Take It with You	Frank Capra	Jean Arthur, Lionel Barrymore, James Stewart and Edward Arnold	
1938	Three Loves Has Nancy	Richard Thorpe	Janet Gaynor, Robert Montgomery and Franchot Tone	
1938	The Mad Miss Manton	Leigh Jason	Barbara Stanwyck and Henry Fonda	
1938	Say It in French	Andrew L. Stone	Ray Milland and Olympe Bradna	
1939	Midnight	Mitchell Leisen	Claudette Colbert and Don Ameche	
1939	It's a Wonderful World	W. S. Van Dyke	Claudette Colbert and James Stewart	
1939	Bachelor Mother	Garson Kanin	Ginger Rogers, David Niven and Charles Coburn	
1939	Ninotchka	Ernst Lubitsch	Greta Garbo and Melvyn Douglas	
1940	His Girl Friday (remake of The Front Page (1931))	Howard Hawks	Cary Grant, Rosalind Russell and Ralph Bellamy	
1940	Too Many Husbands	Wesley Ruggles	Jean Arthur, Fred MacMurray and Melvyn Douglas	
1940	My Favorite Wife	Garson Kanin	Cary Grant and Irene Dunne	
1940	The Great McGinty	Preston Sturges	Brian Donlevy, Muriel Angelus and Akim Tamiroff	
1940	I Love You Again	W. S. Van Dyke	William Powell and Myrna Loy	
1940	Christmas in July	Preston Sturges	Dick Powell and Ellen Drew	
1940	The Philadelphia Story	George Cukor	Katharine Hepburn, Cary Grant and James Stewart	
1941	Mr. and Mrs. Smith	Alfred Hitchcock	Robert Montgomery and Carole Lombard	
1941	The Lady Eve	Preston Sturges	Barbara Stanwyck and Henry Fonda	
1941	The Devil and Miss Jones	Sam Wood	Jean Arthur, Robert Cummings and Charles Coburn	
1941	Love Crazy	Jack Conway	William Powell and Myrna Loy	
1941	Tom, Dick and Harry	Garson Kanin	Ginger Rogers	
1941	The Bride Came C.O.D.	William Keighley	James Cagney and Bette Davis	
1941	Unfinished Business	Gregory La Cava	Robert Montgomery and Irene Dunne	
1941	You Belong to Me	Wesley Ruggles	Barbara Stanwyck and Henry Fonda	
1941	Ball of Fire	Howard Hawks	Barbara Stanwyck and Gary Cooper	
1941	Sullivan's Travels	Preston Sturges	Joel McCrea and Veronica Lake	
1942	To Be or Not To Be	Ernst Lubitsch	Carole Lombard (her last role), Jack Benny, Robert Stack	
1942	The Major and the Minor	Billy Wilder	Ginger Rogers and Ray Milland	
1942	Girl Trouble	Harold Schuster	Don Ameche and Joan Bennett	
1942	I Married a Witch	René Clair	Fredric March and Veronica Lake	
1942	The Palm Beach Story	Preston Sturges	Claudette Colbert and Joel McCrea	
1943	The More the Merrier	George Stevens	Jean Arthur and Joel McCrea	
1943	Slightly Dangerous	Wesley Ruggles	Lana Turner and Robert Young	
1944	The Miracle of Morgan's Creek	Preston Sturges	Betty Hutton and Eddie Bracken	
1944	Arsenic and Old Lace	Frank Capra	Cary Grant and Priscilla Lane	
1944	Bride by Mistake (remake of The Richest Girl in the World (1934))	Richard Wallace	Alan Marshal and Laraine Day	
1945	Eve Knew Her Apples (the first musical remake of It Happened One Night (1934))	Will Jason	Ann Miller and William Wright	
1945	Christmas in Connecticut	Peter Godfrey	Barbara Stanwyck and Dennis Morgan	
1946	Cluny Brown	Ernst Lubitsch	Charles Boyer and Jennifer Jones	
1946	Easy to Wed (musical remake of Libeled Lady (1936))	Edward Buzzell	Van Johnson, Esther Williams, Lucille Ball and Keenan Wynn	
1947	The Bachelor and the Bobby-Soxer	Irving Reis	Cary Grant, Myrna Loy and Shirley Temple	
1948	Romance on the High Seas	Michael Curtiz	Jack Carson and Doris Day	
1948	A Song Is Born (musical remake of Ball of Fire (1941))	Howard Hawks	Danny Kaye and Virginia Mayo	
1948	That Wonderful Urge (remake of Love Is News (1937))	Robert B. Sinclair	Tyrone Power and Gene Tierney	
1949	I Was a Male War Bride	Howard Hawks	Cary Grant and Ann Sheridan	

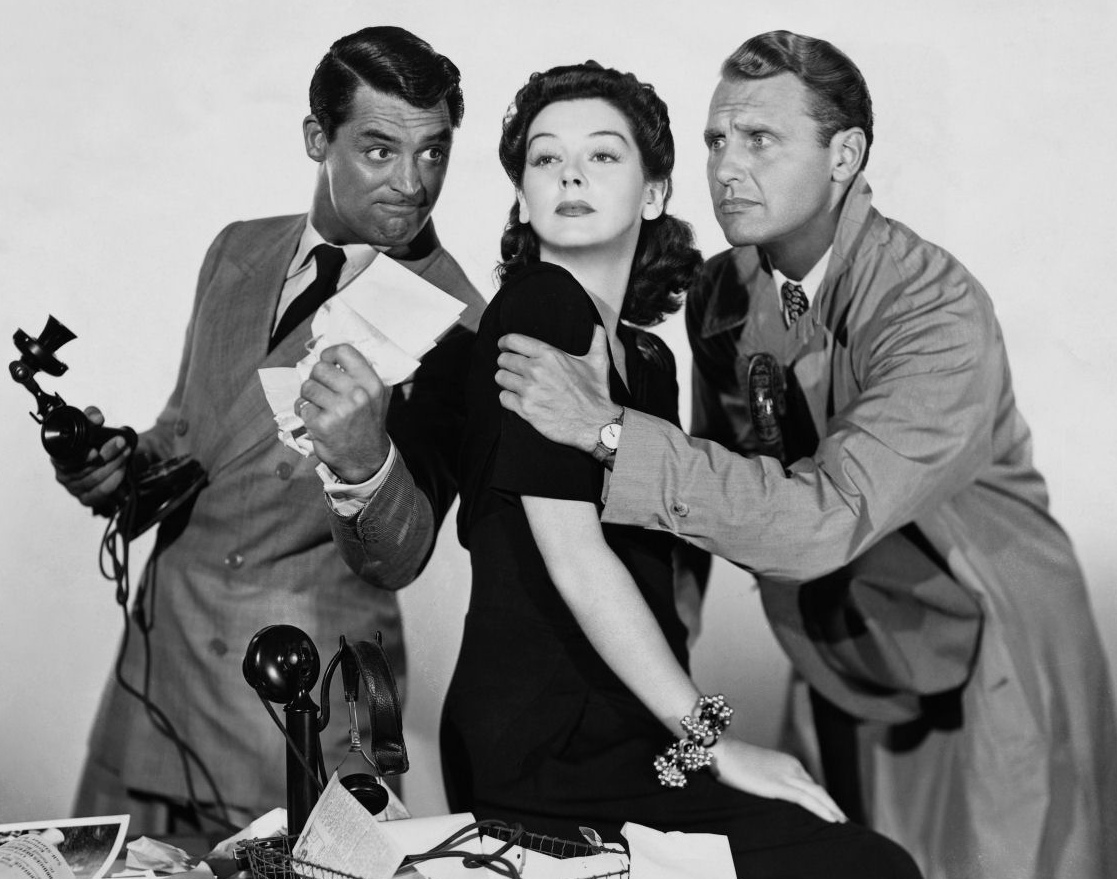
A promotional photo for the 1940 screwball comedy His Girl Friday

Other films from this period in other genres incorporate elements of the screwball comedy. For example, Alfred Hitchcock's thriller The 39 Steps (1935) features the gimmick of a young couple who finds themselves handcuffed together and who eventually, almost despite themselves, fall in love with one another, and Woody Van Dyke's detective comedy The Thin Man (1934), which portrays a witty, urbane couple who trade barbs as they solve mysteries together. Some of the Fred Astaire and Ginger Rogers musicals of the 1930s also feature screwball comedy plots, such as The Gay Divorcee (1934), Top Hat (1935), and Carefree (1938), which costars Ralph Bellamy. The Eddie Cantor musicals Whoopee! (1930) and Roman Scandals (1933), and slapstick road movies such as Six of a Kind (1934) include screwball elements. Some of the Joe E. Brown comedies also fall into this category, particularly Broadminded (1931) and Earthworm Tractors (1936). Screwball comedies such as The Philadelphia Story (1940) and Ball of Fire (1941) also received musical remakes, High Society (1956) and A Song is Born (1948).

Actors and actresses featured in or associated with screwball comedy:

- Jean Arthur
- Fred Astaire
- Ralph Bellamy
- Constance Bennett
- Eric Blore
- Jack Carson
- Charles Coburn
- Claudette Colbert
- Gary Cooper
- Marion Davies
- William Demarest
- Melvyn Douglas
- Irene Dunne
- Kay Francis
- Clark Gable
- Cary Grant
- Jean Harlow
- Katharine Hepburn
- Edward Everett Horton
- Harold Lloyd
- Carole Lombard
- Myrna Loy
- Fred MacMurray
- Fredric March
- Joel McCrea
- Ray Milland
- William Powell
- Tyrone Power
- Ginger Rogers
- Rosalind Russell
- Barbara Stanwyck
- James Stewart

Directors of screwball comedies:

- Lloyd Bacon
- Frank Capra
- George Cukor
- Michael Curtiz
- Tay Garnett
- Alexander Hall
- Howard Hawks
- Garson Kanin
- Gregory La Cava
- Mitchell Leisen
- Ernst Lubitsch
- Leo McCarey
- Norman Z. McLeod
- Wesley Ruggles
- William A. Seiter
- George Stevens
- Preston Sturges
- Richard Thorpe
- W. S. Van Dyke
- James Whale
- Billy Wilder

== Later examples ==
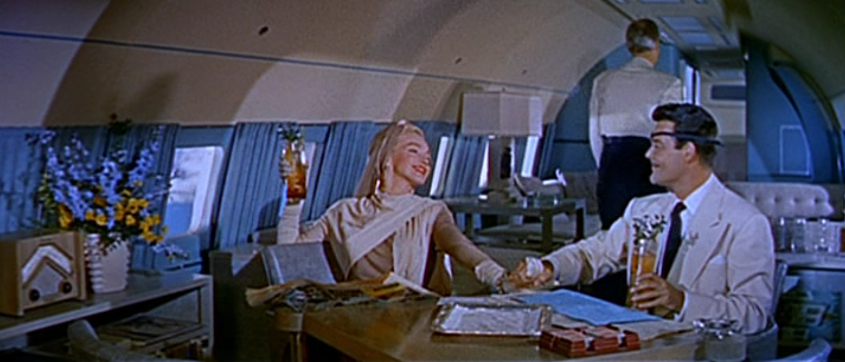
A screenshot from a trailer for How to Marry a Millionaire

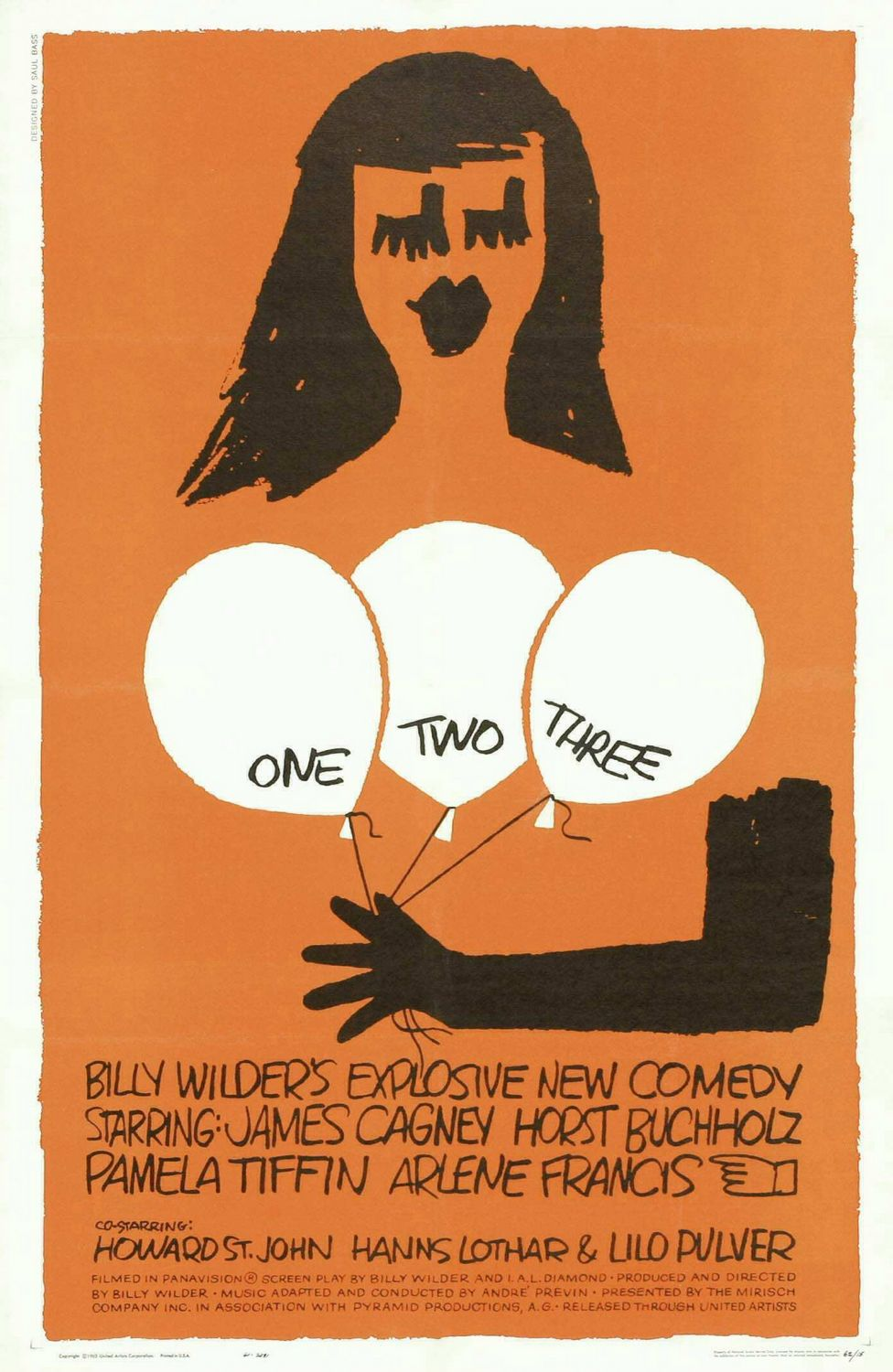
One, Two, Three (1961)

Later films thought to have revived elements of the classic era screwball comedies include:

- Champagne for Caesar (1950), d. Richard Whorf
- The Mating Season (1951), d. Mitchell Leisen
- Monkey Business (1952), d. Howard Hawks
- How to Marry a Millionaire (1953), d. Jean Negulesco
- Let's Do It Again (1953), d. Alexander Hall, musical remake of The Awful Truth (1937)
- Living It Up (1954), d. Norman Taurog, remake of Nothing Sacred (1937)
- Three for the Show (1955), d. H. C. Potter, musical remake of Too Many Husbands
- The Seven Year Itch (1955), d. Billy Wilder
- You're Never Too Young (1955), d. Norman Taurog, musical remake of The Major and the Minor
- The Birds and the Bees (1956), d. Norman Taurog, a musical remake of The Lady Eve (1941)
- High Society (1956), d. Charles Walters, musical remake of The Philadelphia Story (1940)
- You Can't Run Away from It (1956) d. Dick Powell, the second musical remake of It Happened One Night (1934)
- Bundle of Joy (1956) d. Norman Taurog, musical remake of Bachelor Mother (1939)
- Silk Stockings (1957), d. Rouben Mamoulian, musical remake of Ninotchka (1939)
- My Man Godfrey (1957), d. Henry Koster (1936), remake of 1936 film of the same name
- Chalti Ka Naam Gaadi (1958), d. Satyen Bose
- The Girl Most Likely (1958), d. Mitchell Leisen, a musical remake of Tom, Dick and Harry
- Rock-A-Bye Baby (1958), d. Frank Tashlin, a musical remake of The Miracle of Morgan's Creek (1944)
- Bell, Book and Candle (1958), d. Richard Quine
- Pillow Talk (1959), d. Michael Gordon
- Some Like It Hot (1959), d. Billy Wilder
- The Grass Is Greener (1960), d. Stanley Donen
- Lover Come Back (1961), d. Delbert Mann
- One, Two, Three (1961), d. Billy Wilder, which contains elements of Ninotchka, co-written by Wilder
- Charade (1963), d. Stanley Donen
- It's a Mad, Mad, Mad, Mad World (1963), d. Stanley Kramer
- Move Over, Darling (1963) d. Michael Gordon, remake of My Favorite Wife (1940)
- Man's Favorite Sport? (1964), d. Howard Hawks, homage to Bringing Up Baby (1938), also directed by Hawks
- Send Me No Flowers (1964), d. Norman Jewison
- What's New Pussycat? (1965), d. Clive Donner
- Walk, Don't Run (1966), d. Charles Walters, remake of The More the Merrier (1943)
- What's Up, Doc? (1972), d. Peter Bogdanovich
- For Pete's Sake (1974), d. Peter Yates
- Foul Play (1978), d. Colin Higgins
- Heaven Can Wait (1978), d. Warren Beatty and Buck Henry
- Arthur (1981), d. Steve Gordon
- Under the Rainbow (1981) d. Steve Rash
- To Be or Not to Be (1983), d. Alan Johnson, remake of the 1942 film of the same name
- Poochakkoru Mookkuthi (1984), d. Priyadarshan, based on Charles Dickens's play 'The Strange Gentleman'
- Unfaithfully Yours (1984), d. Howard Zieff, a remake of the 1948 Preston Sturges film of the same name
- Une Femme ou Deux (transl. "One Woman or Two"; 1985), d. Daniel Vigne
- Desperately Seeking Susan (1985), d. Susan Seidelman
- Something Wild (1986), d. Jonathan Demme
- Overboard (1987), d. Garry Marshall
- Raising Arizona (1987), d. Coen Brothers
- Who's That Girl (1987) d. James Foley
- Switching Channels (1988), d. Ted Kotcheff, a remake of His Girl Friday (1940)
- Women on the Verge of a Nervous Breakdown (1988), d. Pedro Almodóvar
- Oscar (1991) d. John Landis
- Sólo con tu pareja (1991), d. Alfonso Cuarón
- Housesitter (1992), d. Frank Oz
- The Hudsucker Proxy (1994), d. Joel Coen
- Radioland Murders (1994), d. Mel Smith from story by George Lucas
- Flirting with Disaster (1996), d. David O. Russell
- Runaway Bride (1999) d. Garry Marshall
- Little Nicky (2000), d. Steven Brill
- Rat Race (2001), d. Jerry Zucker
- Intolerable Cruelty (2003), d. Coen Brothers
- Anchorman: The Legend of Ron Burgundy (2004), d. Adam McKay
- I Heart Huckabees (2004), d. David O. Russell
- Miss Pettigrew Lives for a Day (2008), d. Bharat Nalluri
- Our Idiot Brother (2011), d. Jesse Peretz
- While We're Young (2014), d. Noah Baumbach
- She's Funny That Way (2014), d. Peter Bogdanovich
- Mistress America (2015), d. Noah Baumbach
- Night Owls (2015), d. Charles Hood
- Hail, Caesar! (2016), d. Coen Brothers
- Chongqing Hot Pot (2016), d. Yang Qing
- Hit Man (2023), d. Richard Linklater
- Anora (2024), d. Sean Baker
- Splitsville (2025), d. Michael Angelo Covino

Elements of classic screwball comedy often found in more recent films which might otherwise be classified as romantic comedies include the "battle of the sexes" (Down with Love, How to Lose a Guy in 10 Days), witty repartee (Down with Love), and the contrast between the wealthy and the middle class (You've Got Mail, Two Weeks Notice). Many of Elvis Presley's films from the 1960s had drawn, consciously or unconsciously, the many characteristics of the screwball comedy genre. Some examples are Double Trouble, Tickle Me, Girl Happy and Live a Little, Love a Little. Modern updates on screwball comedy are also sometimes categorized as black comedy (Intolerable Cruelty, which also features a twist on the classic screwball element of divorce and remarriage). The Coen Brothers often include screwball elements in a film which may not otherwise be considered screwball or even a comedy.

The Golmaal films, a series of Hindi-language Indian films, has been described as a screwball comedy franchise.

== Screwball comedy elements in other media and genres ==
The screwball film tradition influenced television sitcom and comedy drama genres. Notable screwball couples in television have included Sam and Diane in Cheers, Maddie and David in Moonlighting, and Joel and Maggie in Northern Exposure. The comedy-drama series Gilmore Girls has been compared by scholars to the screwball comedy genre, particularly for its fast-paced repartee and emphasis on class divisions. Creator Amy Sherman-Palladino has stated that repartee was inspired by the Katherine Hepburn-Spencer Tracy films.

In his 2008 production of the classic Beaumarchais comedy The Marriage of Figaro, author William James Royce trimmed the five-act play down to three acts and labeled it a "classic screwball comedy". The playwright made Suzanne the central character, endowing her with all the feisty comedic strengths of her classic film counterparts. In his adaptation, entitled One Mad Day! (a play on Beaumarchais' original French title), Royce underscored all of the elements of the classic screwball comedy, suggesting that Beaumarchais may have had a hand in the origins of the genre.

The plot of Corrupting Dr. Nice, a science fiction novel by John Kessel involving time travel, is modeled on films such as The Lady Eve and Bringing Up Baby.

The novel "Ticktock"(1996) by Dean Koontz showcases a blend of screwball comedy with supernatural horror.

== See also ==
- Comedy of manners
- Comedy of remarriage
- Farce
- Hawksian woman
- Love-hate relationship
- Sex comedy
- Slapstick film
