= The U.P. Trail =

1920 film

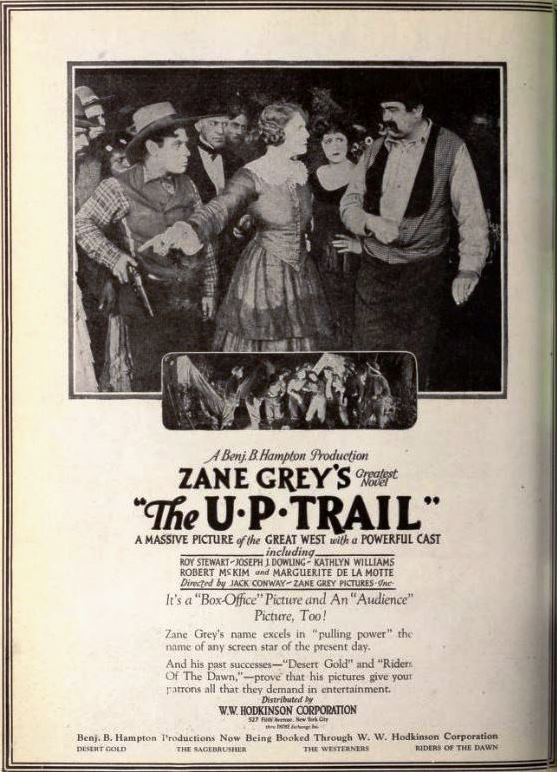
- Advertisement
- Directed by: Jack Conway
- Written by: Zane Grey (novel); William Clifford
- Produced by: Benjamin B. Hampton
- Starring: Kathlyn Williams; Roy Stewart; Marguerite De La Motte
- Cinematography: Enrique Juan Vallejo
- Production companies: Zane Grey Pictures; W. W. Hodkinson Corporation
- Distributed by: Pathé Exchange
- Release date: November 1920
- Running time: 7 reels
- Country: United States
- Languages: Silent; English intertitles

The U.P. Trail is a 1920 American silent Western film directed by Jack Conway and starring Kathlyn Williams, Roy Stewart, and Marguerite De La Motte. It is based the best-selling novel of the same name by Zane Grey.

== Cast ==
- Kathlyn Williams as 'Beauty' Stanton
- Roy Stewart as Warren Neale
- Marguerite De La Motte as Allie Lee
- Robert McKim as Jose Durade
- Joseph J. Dowling as 'Place' Hough
- Fred Starr as Fresno
- Charles Murphy as Larry 'Red' King
- Virginia Caldwell as Ruby Cortez
- Walter Perry as Casey
- George Berrell as Slingerland

== Bibliography ==
- Goble, Alan, ed. (1999). The Complete Index to Literary Sources in Film. Berlin: Walter de Gruyter. ISBN 978-3-11-095194-3.
