= Her Sacrifice =

1926 film

- Directed by: Wilfred Lucas
- Written by: Manuel Acuña (play); Edwin J. Sullivan
- Produced by: Frank M. Sanford
- Starring: Gaston Glass; Bryant Washburn; Gladys Brockwell
- Cinematography: Harry M. Fowler; Enrique Juan Vallejo
- Production company: Sanford Productions
- Distributed by: Sanford Productions
- Release date: September 27, 1926
- Running time: 60 minutes
- Country: United States
- Languages: Silent; English intertitles

Her Sacrifice is a 1926 American silent drama film directed by Wilfred Lucas and starring Gaston Glass, Bryant Washburn and Gladys Brockwell. It is based on an 1871 play by the Mexican writer Manuel Acuña.

== Plot ==
After discovering that he has won a scholarship to study painting in Paris, a young man proposes to his girlfriend. She is reluctant because of a secret in her past, but her persuades her to accompany him to France, where she models to augment his funds. He wins a large prize for his work, and the couple look set to return home in triumph. However, when the man who once seduced her appears and threatens her happiness, she attempts suicide. The story climaxes in a duel between the two men.

== Cast ==
- Gaston Glass as David Orland
- Bryant Washburn as Donald Gorham
- Herbert Rawlinson as James Romaine
- Gladys Brockwell as Mary Cullen
- Wilfred Lucas as Edwin Ramsey
- Ligia de Golconda as Margarita Darlow
- Gene Crosby as Wayne Landis
- Hector V. Sarno as Prof. Oliver
- Charles A. Post as Ambassador Dupree
- Barbara Tennant as Madame Dupree
- Marshall Ruth as Cyril

== Bibliography ==
- Connelly, Robert B. The Silents: Silent Feature Films, 1910-36, Volume 40, Issue 2. December Press, 1998.
- Munden, Kenneth White. The American Film Institute Catalog of Motion Pictures Produced in the United States, Part 1. University of California Press, 1997.
