= Enrique Juan Vallejo =

Mexican cinematographer, film director

- Born: May 6, 1882; Mexico
- Died: May 3, 1950 (aged 67); Hollywood, California
- Occupation(s): Cinematographer and film director
- Spouse: Katherine Chase

Enrique Juan Vallejo (6 May 1882 – 3 May 1950) was a Mexican cinematographer and film director.

He worked alongside Frank D. Williams on Kid Auto Races at Venice (1914), starring Charlie Chaplin, alongside Harry M. Fowler on Tarzan of the Apes (1918), and alongside Henry Sharp on Don Q, Son of Zorro (1925), directed by Donald Crisp. He also worked on Making a Living (1914), directed by Henry Lehrman, produced by Mack Sennett and written by Reed Heustis;

== Filmography ==
- Her Sacrifice (1926)
- Don Q Son of Zorro (1925)
- General Álvaro Obregón en el castillo de Chapultepec (1922)
- The Three Must-Get-Theres (1922)
- Hombre sin patria (1922)
- The Millionaire (1921)
- The Lure of Egypt (1921)
- The Spenders (1921)
- The Killer (1921)
- Mitad y mitad (1921)
- The U.P. Trail (1920)
- The Money Changers (1920)
- The Dwelling Place of Light (1920)
- Riders of the Dawn (1920)
- The Romance of Tarzan (1918)
- Tarzan of the Apes (1918)
- The Eyes of the World (1917)
- Ramona (1916)
- The Spanish Jade (1915)
- Kid Auto Races at Venice (1914)
- Making a Living (1914)
