= Bringing Up Baby =

1938 film by Howard Hawks

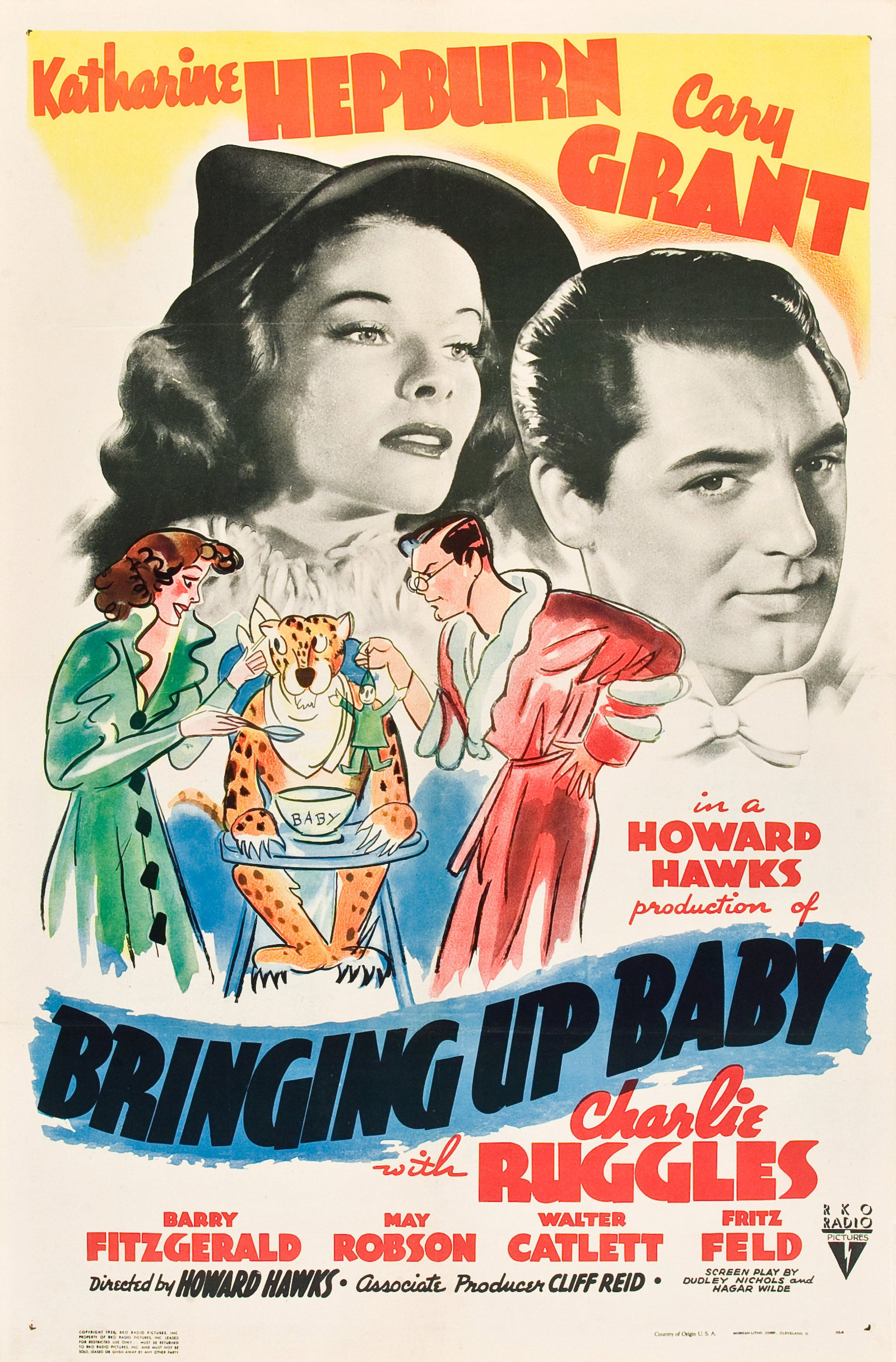
- Theatrical release poster
- Directed by: Howard Hawks
- Screenplay by: Dudley Nichols; Hagar Wilde
- Story by: Hagar Wilde
- Based on: Bringing Up Baby; 1937 short story in Collier's by Hagar Wilde
- Produced by: Cliff Reid; Howard Hawks
- Starring: Katharine Hepburn; Cary Grant; Charles Ruggles; Barry Fitzgerald; May Robson; Walter Catlett; Fritz Feld
- Cinematography: Russell Metty
- Edited by: George Hively
- Music by: Roy Webb
- Production company: RKO Radio Pictures
- Distributed by: RKO Radio Pictures
- Release date: February 16, 1938 (Golden Gate Theatre)
- Running time: 102 minutes
- Country: United States
- Language: English
- Budget: $1.1 million
- Box office: $1.1 million

Bringing Up Baby is a 1938 American screwball comedy film directed by Howard Hawks, and starring Katharine Hepburn and Cary Grant. It was released by RKO Radio Pictures. The film tells the story of a paleontologist in a number of predicaments involving a scatterbrained heiress and a leopard named Baby. The screenplay was adapted by Dudley Nichols and Hagar Wilde from a short story by Wilde which originally appeared in Collier's Weekly magazine in April 1937.

The script was written specifically for Hepburn, and tailored to her personality. Filming began in September 1937 and wrapped in January 1938, behind schedule and over budget. Production was frequently delayed by Hepburn and Grant's uncontrollable laughing fits. Hepburn struggled with her comedic performance and was coached by another cast member, vaudeville veteran Walter Catlett. A tame leopard named Nissa was used during the shooting and played two roles in the film; Nissa's trainer stood off-screen with a whip for all of its scenes.

Bringing Up Baby had the reputation of a flop upon its release, although it eventually made a small profit after its re-release in the early 1940s. Labeled "box office poison" by the Independent Theatre Owners of America, Hepburn saw her career wane until The Philadelphia Story two years later. Bringing Up Baby's reputation began to grow during the 1950s when it was shown on television gaining acclaim for its perfectly timed over-the-top screwball comedy. In 1990 it was selected for preservation in the National Film Registry of the Library of Congress as "culturally, historically, or aesthetically significant", and has appeared on a number of greatest-films rankings, including the American Film Institute's 100 Years...100 Movies list. Some have considered it one of the greatest comedy films of all time.

== Plot ==
David Huxley is a mild-mannered paleontologist. For the past four years, he has been assembling the skeleton of a Brontosaurus but is missing one bone: the intercostal clavicle. Adding to his stress is his impending marriage to Alice Swallow and the need to impress Elizabeth Random, who is considering a million-dollar donation to his museum. The day before his wedding, David meets Susan Vance by chance on a golf course. She plays his ball, oblivious that she has made a mistake. Susan is a free-spirited, somewhat scatterbrained, young lady, unfettered by logic. These qualities soon embroil David in several frustrating incidents.

Susan's brother Mark has sent her a tame leopard named Baby from Brazil. Its tameness is helped by hearing the song "I Can't Give You Anything but Love, Baby". Susan thinks David is a zoologist, and manipulates him into accompanying her in taking Baby to her farm in Connecticut. Complications arise when Susan falls in love with him, and she tries to keep him at her house as long as possible, even hiding his clothes, to prevent his imminent marriage.

David's prized intercostal clavicle is delivered, but Susan's aunt's dog George takes it and buries it somewhere. When Susan's aunt arrives, she discovers David in a negligee. To David's dismay, she turns out to be Elizabeth Random. A second message from Mark makes clear the leopard is for Elizabeth, as she always wanted one. Baby and George, who have befriended one another, run off. The zoo is called to help capture Baby. Susan and David race to find Baby before the zookeepers do and, mistaking a dangerous leopard from a nearby circus for Baby, they let it out of its cage.

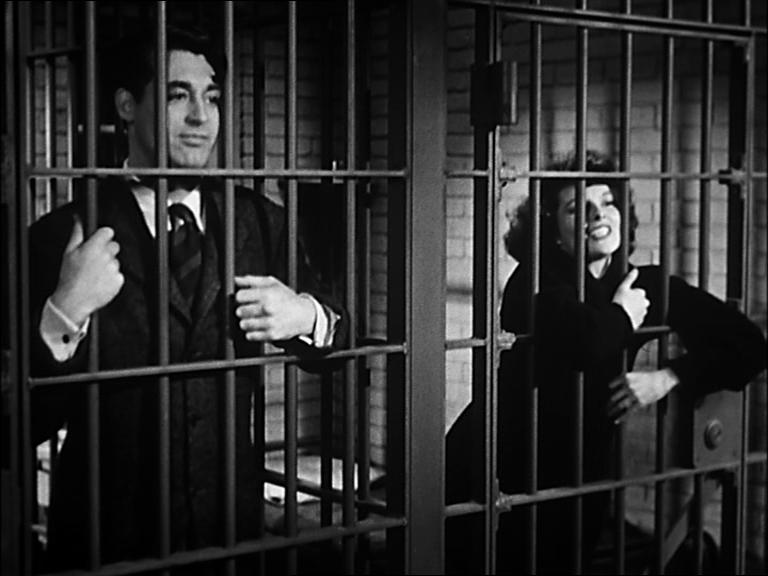
David and Susan in jail

David and Susan are jailed by a befuddled town policeman, Constable Slocum, for acting strangely at the house of Dr. Fritz Lehman, where they have cornered the circus leopard, thinking it is Baby. When Slocum does not believe their story, Susan tells him they are members of the "Leopard Gang"; she calls herself "Swingin' Door Susie", and David "Jerry the Nipper". Eventually, when everyone's identity has been cleared up, Susan (who earlier escaped out a window) returns, dragging a leopard on a rope. When she realizes this is not Baby but the highly irritated circus leopard, David saves Susan, using a chair to shoo the big cat into a cell.

Several weeks later, Susan finds David, who has been jilted by Alice because of her, working on his Brontosaurus reconstruction at the museum. After giving him the missing bone (which she found by trailing George for three days), and against his warnings, Susan climbs a tall ladder next to the dinosaur to be closer to him. She tells David that her aunt has given her the million dollars to donate to the museum, but David is more interested in telling her that the day spent with her was the best day of his life. They declare their love for each other, and Susan, distracted by the moment, unconsciously swings the ladder further from side to side. As they talk, and the ladder sways more and more with each swing, Susan and David finally notice that Susan is in danger. Frightened, she climbs onto the skeleton, eventually causing it to collapse. David grabs her hand before she falls, lifts her onto the platform, and, surveying the fallen dinosaur, halfheartedly complains about the loss of his years of work on his Brontosaurus as she talks him into forgiving her. Resigning himself to a future of chaos, David embraces Susan.

== Cast ==
- Katharine Hepburn as Susan Vance
- Cary Grant as Dr. David Huxley (alias Mr. Bone)
- Charles Ruggles as Major Horace Applegate, a big-game hunter
- Walter Catlett as Constable Slocum
- Barry Fitzgerald as Aloysius Gogarty, Mrs. Random's gardener
- May Robson as Elizabeth Carlton Random, Susan's aunt
- Fritz Feld as Dr. Fritz Lehman, an affluent psychiatrist
- Leona Roberts as Hannah Gogarty, Aloysius's wife and Mrs. Random's servant
- George Irving as Alexander Peabody, Mrs. Random's lawyer
- Tala Birell as Mrs. Lehman, Dr. Lehman's wife
- Virginia Walker as Alice Swallow, David's fiancée
- John Kelly as Elmer, Constable Slocum's assistant

Uncredited

- D'Arcy Corrigan as Professor LaTouche
- Billy Bevan as Tom, the barkeeper
- Billy Franey as the butcher
- Billy Benedict as David's caddy
- Dick Lane as the circus manager
- Ward Bond as a motorcycle policeman
- Jack Carson as a circus roustabout

Animals

- Skippy as George, Mrs. Random's dog
- Nissa as Baby and the circus leopard

== Production ==
=== Development and writing ===
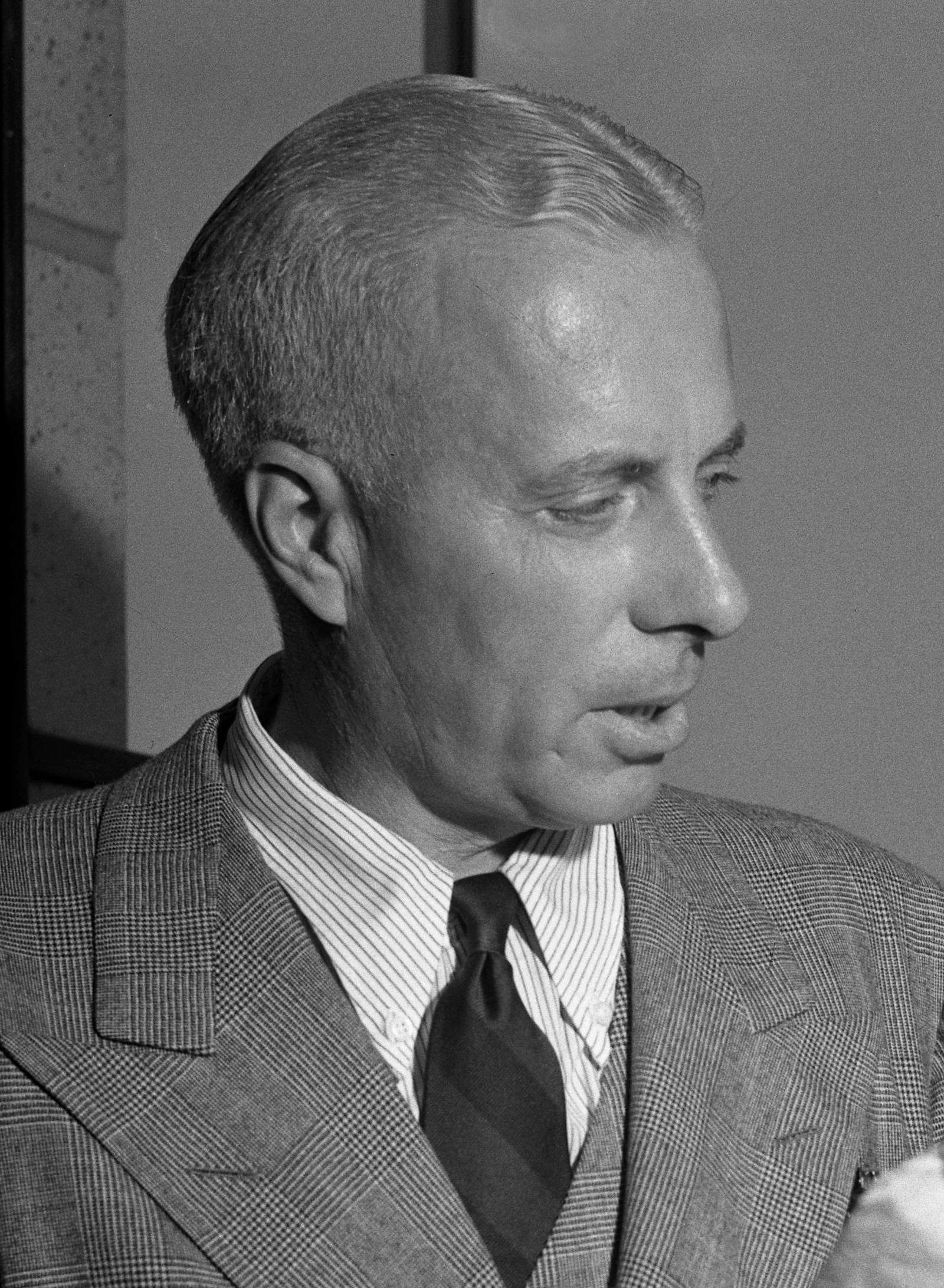
Director Howard Hawks began working on Bringing Up Baby after plans to adapt Gunga Din were delayed.

In March 1937 Howard Hawks signed a contract at RKO for an adaptation of Rudyard Kipling's Gunga Din, which had been in pre-production since the previous fall. When RKO was unable to borrow Clark Gable, Spencer Tracy and Franchot Tone from Metro-Goldwyn-Mayer, the adaptation was delayed and Hawks began looking for a new project. In April he read a short story by Hagar Wilde in Collier's magazine called Bringing Up Baby and immediately wanted to make a film from it, as it had made him laugh out loud. RKO bought the screen rights in June for $1,004, and Hawks worked briefly with Wilde on the film's treatment. Wilde's short story differed significantly from the film: David and Susan are engaged, he is not a scientist and there is no dinosaur, intercostal clavicle or museum. However, Susan gets a pet panther from her brother Mark to give to their Aunt Elizabeth; David and Susan must capture the panther in the Connecticut wilderness with the help of Baby's favorite song, "I Can't Give You Anything but Love, Baby".

Hawks then hired screenwriter Dudley Nichols, best known for his work with director John Ford, for the script. Wilde would develop the characters and comedic elements of the screenplay, while Nichols would take care of the story and structure. Hawks worked with the two writers during summer 1937, and they came up with a 202-page script. Wilde and Nichols wrote several drafts together, beginning a romantic relationship and co-authoring the Fred Astaire and Ginger Rogers film Carefree a few months later. The Bringing Up Baby script underwent several changes, and at one point there was an elaborate pie fight, inspired by Mack Sennett films. Major Applegate had an assistant and food taster named Ali (intended to be played by Mischa Auer), but this character was replaced with gardener Aloysius Gogarty. The final draft had several scenes in the middle of the film in which David and Susan declare their love for each other which Hawks cut during production.

Nichols was instructed to write the film for Hepburn, with whom he had worked on John Ford's Mary of Scotland (1936). Barbara Leaming alleged that Ford had an affair with Hepburn, and claims that many of the characteristics of Susan and David were based on Hepburn and Ford. Nichols was in touch with Ford during the screenwriting, and the film included such members of the John Ford Stock Company as Ward Bond, Barry Fitzgerald, D'Arcy Corrigan and associate producer Cliff Reid. Ford was a friend of Hawks, and visited the set. The round glasses Grant wears in Bringing Up Baby are reminiscent of Harold Lloyd and of Ford.

Principal photography was scheduled to begin on September 1, 1937 and wrap on October 31, but was delayed for several reasons. Production had to wait until mid-September to clear the rights for "I Can't Give You Anything but Love, Baby" for $1,000. In August Hawks hired gag writers Robert McGowan and Gertrude Purcell for uncredited script rewrites, and McGowan added a scene inspired by the comic strip Professor Dinglehoofer and his Dog in which a dog buries a rare dinosaur bone. RKO paid King Features $1,000 on September 21 to use the idea.

=== Casting ===
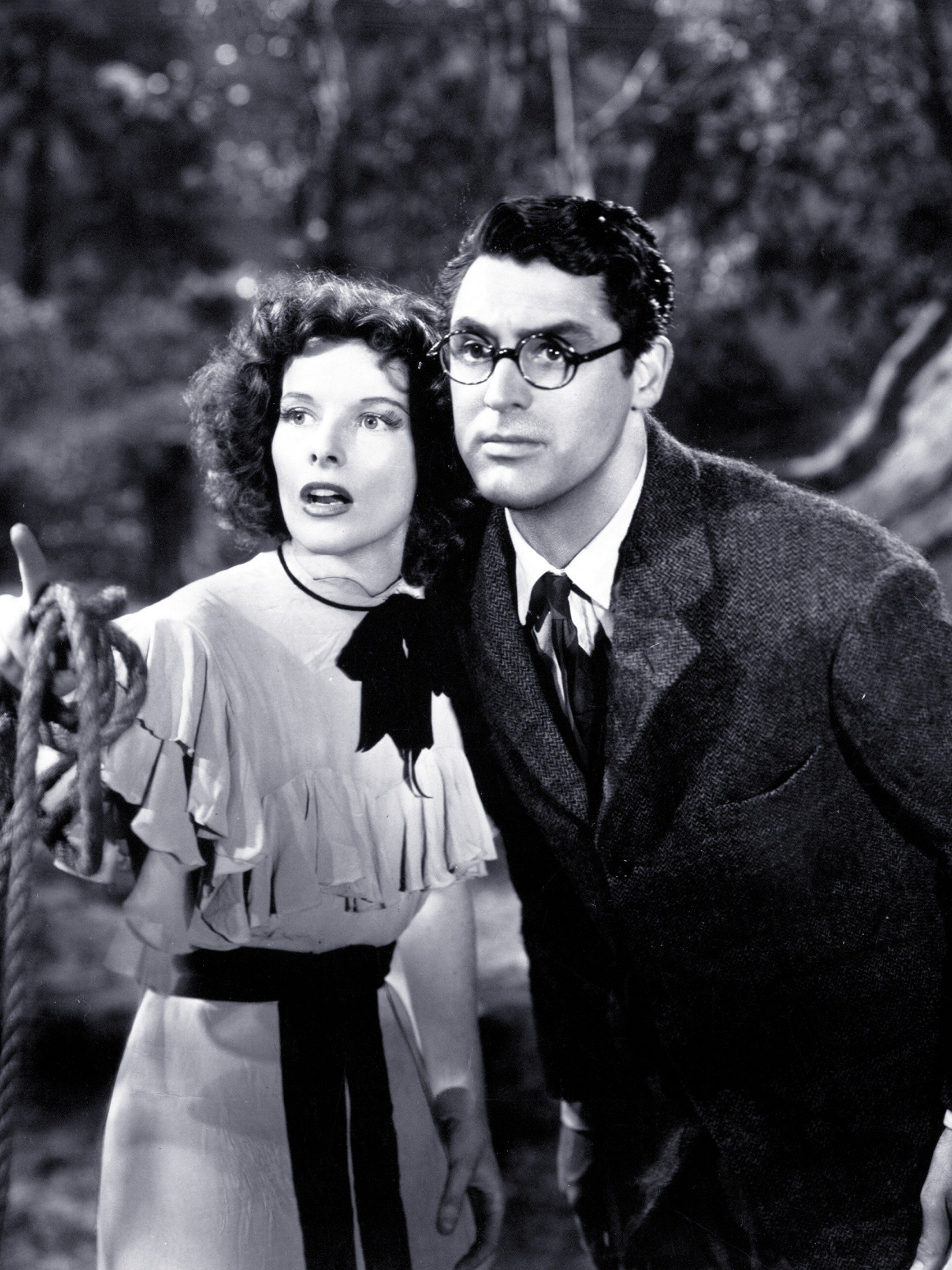
Hepburn and Grant in their second of four film collaborations

After briefly considering Hawks's cousin Carole Lombard for the role of Susan Vance, the producers chose Katharine Hepburn to play the wealthy New Englander because of her background and similarities to the character. RKO agreed to the casting, but had reservations because of Hepburn's salary and lack of box-office success for several years. Producer Lou Lusty said, "You couldn't even break even, if a Hepburn show cost eight hundred grand." Hawks and producer Pandro S. Berman could not agree on whom to cast in the role of David Huxley. Hawks initially wanted silent-film comedian Harold Lloyd; Berman rejected Lloyd and Ronald Colman, offering the role to Robert Montgomery, Fredric March and Ray Milland, all of whom turned it down.

Hawks' friend Howard Hughes finally suggested Cary Grant for the role. Grant had just finished shooting his breakthrough romantic comedy The Awful Truth (1937), and Hawks may have seen a rough cut of the unreleased film. At the time Grant had a non-exclusive, four-picture deal with RKO at $50,000 per film, but Grant's manager used his casting in Bringing Up Baby to renegotiate his contract, earning him $75,000 plus the bonuses Hepburn was receiving. Grant was concerned about being able to play an intellectual character and took two weeks to accept the role, despite the new contract. Hawks built Grant's confidence by promising to coach him throughout the production, instructing him to watch Harold Lloyd films for inspiration. Grant often met with Howard Hughes to discuss his character, which he said helped his performance.

Hawks obtained character actors Charlie Ruggles on loan from Paramount Pictures for Major Horace Applegate and Barry Fitzgerald on loan from The Mary Pickford Corporation to play Aloysius Gogarty. Hawks cast Virginia Walker as Alice Swallow, David's fiancée; Walker was under contract to him and later married his brother William Hawks.

=== Nissa the Leopard ===
As Hawks could not find a panther that would work for the film, Baby was changed to a leopard so they could cast the trained leopard Nissa, who had worked in the industry for eight years, making several B-movies.

Both the leopards in the story were played by Nissa, supervised by her trainer Olga Celeste, who stood by with a whip during shooting. Employed by the Luna Park Zoo in Los Angeles, Celeste trained a handful of leopards but her favorite was Nissa, whom she considered nothing more than a large house cat. Nissa was soothed to anything that smelled fragrant, so Celeste used perfume as her main training technique. In the first scene shot for the movie, Hepburn walking around her bedroom and talking on the phone wearing a floating dressing gown. Perfume was sprinkled on the cloth near Hepburn’s knee so that Nissa would rub up against Hepburn’s leg affectionately in the scene.

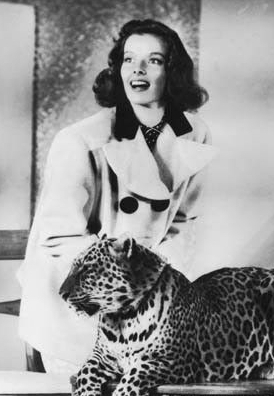
Katharine Hepburn and Nissa in a publicity photo; at one point, Nissa lunged at Hepburn but was stopped by the trainer's whip.

Hepburn was generally unafraid of Nissa until the filming one scene, when Hepburn's skirt twirled, and Nissa lunged at her and had to be subdued by Celeste cracking her whip. Grant, however, was terrified; most scenes of the two interacting are done in close-up with a stand-in. Hepburn played upon his fear by throwing a toy leopard through the roof of Grant's dressing room during production. There were several news reports about Hawks's difficulty filming the live leopard, and the potential danger to highly valuable actors, so some scenes required rear-screen projection.

=== Filming ===
Shooting began September 23, 1937 and was scheduled to end November 20, on a budget of $767,676. Filming began in-studio with the scenes in Susan's apartment, moving to the Bel Air Country Club in early October for the golf-course scenes. The production had a difficult start due to Hepburn's struggles with her character and her comedic abilities. She frequently overacted, trying too hard to be funny, and Hawks asked vaudeville veteran Walter Catlett to help coach her. Catlett acted out scenes with Grant for Hepburn, showing her that he was funnier when he was serious. Hepburn understood, acted naturally and played herself for the rest of the shoot; she was so impressed by Catlett's talent and coaching ability that she insisted he play Constable Slocum.

Most shooting was done at the Arthur Ranch in the San Fernando Valley, which was used as Aunt Elizabeth's estate for interior and exterior scenes. Beginning at the Arthur Ranch shoot, Grant and Hepburn often ad-libbed their dialogue and frequently delayed production by making each other laugh. The scene where Grant frantically asks Hepburn where his bone is, was shot from 10 am until well after 4 pm because of the stars' laughing fits. After one month of shooting Hawks was seven days behind schedule. During the filming, Hawks would refer to four different versions of the script and make frequent changes to scenes and dialogue. His leisurely attitude on set and shutting down production to see a horse race contributed to the lost time. He took twelve days to shoot the Westlake jail scene instead of the scheduled five. Hawks later facetiously blamed the setbacks on his stars' laughing fits and having to work with two animal actors. The terrier George was played by Skippy, known as Asta in The Thin Man film series and co-starring with Grant (as Mr. Smith) in The Awful Truth.

Hawks and Hepburn had a confrontation one day during shooting. While Hepburn was chatting with a crew member, Hawks yelled "Quiet!" until the only person still talking was Hepburn. When Hepburn paused and realized that everyone was looking at her, she asked what was the matter. Hawks asked her if she was finished imitating a parrot. Hepburn took Hawks aside, telling him never to talk to her like that again since she was old friends with most of the crew. When Hawks (an even older friend of the crew) asked a lighting tech whom he would rather drop a light on, Hepburn agreed to behave on set. A variation of this scene, with Grant yelling "Quiet!", was incorporated into the film.

The Westlake Street set was shot at 20th Century Fox Studios. Filming was eventually completed on January 6, 1938, with the scenes outside Mr. Peabody's house. RKO producers expressed concern about the delays and expense, coming in 40 days behind schedule and $330,000 over budget, and also disliked Grant's glasses and Hepburn's hair. The final production cost was $1,096,796.23, primarily due to overtime clauses in Hawks's, Grant's and Hepburn's contracts. While cost for sets and props was only $5,000 over budget, all the actors (including Nissa and Skippy) were paid approximately double their initial salaries. Hepburn's salary rose from $72,500 to $122,000, Grant's from $75,000 to $123,000 and Hawks's from $88,000 to $203,000; Hawks would receive an additional $40,000 to terminate his RKO contract on March 21, 1938.

=== Post-production and previews ===
Hawks's editor George Hively cut the film during its production, and final prints were made a few days after shooting ended. The first cut (10,150 feet long) was sent to the Hays Office in mid-January 1938. Despite several double entendres and sexual references the Office passed the film, overlooking Grant saying he "went gay" or Hepburn's reference to George urinating. The censor's only objections were to the scene where Hepburn's dress is torn, and references to politicians (such as Al Smith and Jim Farley). By February 18, the film was trimmed to 9,204 feet.

As is typical for a Hawks comedy, Bringing Up Baby is fast paced, despite being filmed primarily in long medium shots, with little cross-cutting. Hawks later told Peter Bogdanovich, "You get more pace if you pace the actors quickly within the frame rather than cross cutting fast". The musical score is minimal, primarily consisting of Grant and Hepburn singing "I Can't Give You Anything but Love, Baby". Musical director Roy Webb arranged an instrumental version of the song to play over the opening and closing credits, and the Ritz scene features incidental music.

Bringing Up Baby had two advance previews in January 1938, where it received either "A" or "A+" scores on audience-feedback cards. Producer Pandro S. Berman wanted to cut five more minutes, but relented when Hawks, Grant and Cliff Reid objected. At the second preview, the film received rave reviews and RKO expected a hit.

== Reception ==
=== Critical response ===
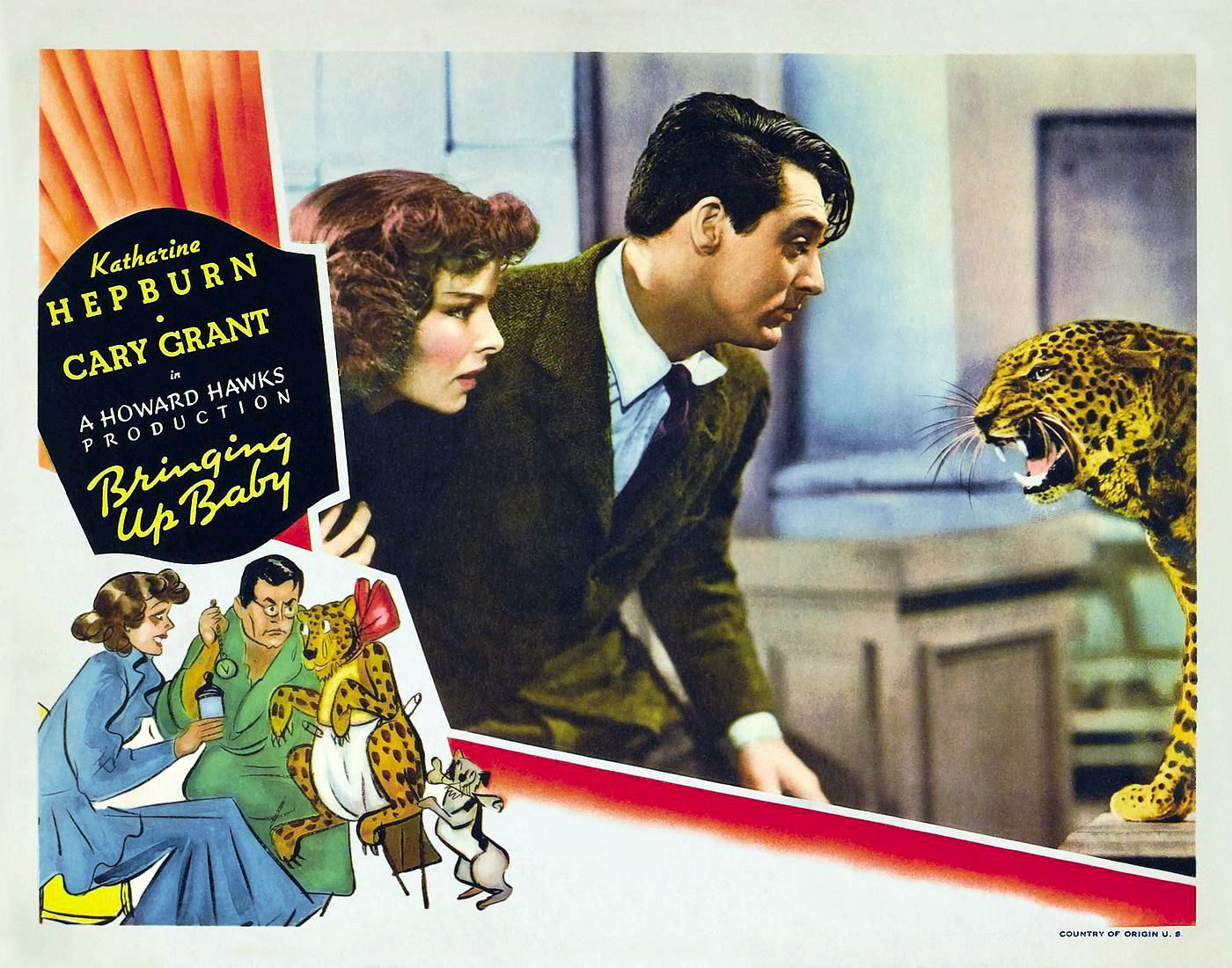
The Bringing Up Baby lobby card

Bringing Up Baby received good advance reviews. Otis Ferguson of The New Republic found the film to be very funny, and praised Hawks's direction. Variety was similarly appreciative, singling out Hawks' pacing and direction, calling Hepburn's performance "one of her most invigorating screen characterizations" and saying Grant "performs his role to the hilt"; their only criticism was the length of the jail scene. Film Daily called it "literally a riot from beginning to end, with the laugh total heavy and the action fast." Harrison's Reports thought the film "An excellent farce" with "many situations that provoke hearty laughter," and John Mosher of The New Yorker wrote that both stars "manage to be funny" and that Hepburn had never "seemed so good-natured." However, Frank S. Nugent of The New York Times disliked the film, considering it derivative and cliché-ridden, a rehash of dozens of other screwball comedies of the period. He labeled Hepburn's performance "breathless, senseless, and terribly, terribly fatiguing", and added, "If you've never been to the movies, Bringing Up Baby will be new to you – a zany-ridden product of the goofy-farce school. But who hasn't been to the movies?"

On review aggregator Rotten Tomatoes, the film holds an approval rating of 97% based on 74 reviews. The site's critical consensus reads: "With Katharine Hepburn and Cary Grant at their effervescent best, Bringing Up Baby is a seamlessly assembled comedy with enduring appeal." On Metacritic, the film holds a weighted average score of 91 out of 100, based on 17 critics, indicating "universal acclaim".

=== Box office ===
At the box office Bringing Up Baby was successful in some parts of the United States, but less so in others. It premiered on February 16, 1938 at the Golden Gate Theatre in San Francisco, where it was a hit, likewise in Los Angeles, Portland, Denver, Cincinnati and Washington, D.C.. However it was a financial disappointment in the Midwest, as well as most other cities. To RKO's chagrin, the film's premiere in New York City on March 3 at Radio City Music Hall made only $70,000, and it was pulled after one week in favor of Jezebel with Bette Davis. During its first run, Bringing Up Baby made $715,000 domestically and $394,000 in foreign markets for a total of $1,109,000. Its reissue in 1940 and 1941 made an additional $95,000 in the U.S. and $55,000 abroad. Following its second run, the film turned out a profit of $163,000.

Due to the perceived failure of Bringing Up Baby commercially, Hawks was released early from his two-film contract with RKO, and Gunga Din was handed over to George Stevens. Hawks later said the film "had a great fault and I learned an awful lot from that. There were no normal people in it. Everyone you met was a screwball and since that time I learned my lesson and don't intend ever again to make everybody crazy." The director went on to work with RKO on three films over the next decade. Long before Bringing Up Baby's release, Hepburn had been branded "box office poison" by Harry Brandt (president of the Independent Theatre Owners of America) and thus was allowed to buy out her RKO contract for $22,000. However, many critics marveled at her new skill at low comedy; Life magazine called her "the surprise of the picture". Hepburn's former boyfriend Howard Hughes bought RKO in 1948 and sold it in 1955, but retained the copyright to Bringing Up Baby (and five other films).

== Themes and interpretations ==
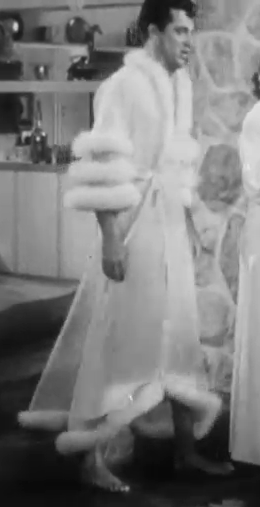
Cary Grant's character wearing a woman's marabou-trimmed negligee. Several writers have argued that Bringing Up Baby blurs or reverses stereotypical gender roles.

Several commentators have written that Bringing Up Baby blurs or reverses stereotypical gender roles assigned to men and women. The bumbling, "sexless" workaholic David is pursued and eventually won over by the anarchic, confident Susan. This is contrasted by David's fiancé Alice, who "dismisses sexuality and reproduction in favor of work." Academics Robin L. Murray and Joseph K. Heumann write, "The bone and leopard are not only real, but they also represent elements missing from David's urban life as resident museum paleontologist and Alice's fiancé: sex and children." By the end of the film, they note, "Instead of returning to his original role intact, David declares his love for Susan, even as his brontosaurus tumbles to the ground, signifying the success of Susan's reeducation of him. Not only has she crushed his glasses to enhance his beauty, but she has also demolished his work."

Murray and Heumann argue that the film's narrative "promotes a cynical view of marriage and a rational urban society", an element that film critic Sheila O'Malley characterizes as common in Hawks's filmography. "Marriage barely exists in Hawks's films, and when it does show up, it's not exactly a blessing," O'Malley writes, "[...] Bringing Up Baby may end in an embrace, but it is impossible to imagine David and Susan in a conventional domestic relationship." Over the course of the film, O'Malley adds, "David becomes a real person. Alice dumps him, saying, 'You showed yourself up in your true colors. You're just a butterfly.' Alice, of course, misses the point, [...] A butterfly doesn't symbolize irresponsibility. A butterfly symbolizes transformation. Susan forces David out of his chrysalis, and he emerges into the limitless night air, where a man can breathe, where a woman not only loves him but returns his bone to him, at last."

Murray and Heumann write that the film also contains themes of exploitation, and the impact of colonialism and the removing of animals from their natural habitats:

Focusing on the unlikely pairing of zany heiress Susan and befuddled paleontologist David, Bringing Up Baby broaches multiple ecocritical questions: Does a natural history museum and its paleontologist David deserve a $1 million donation from Susan's Aunt Elizabeth (May Robson)? Is a rational woman like David's fiancé Alice (Virginia Walker) more or less appealing than an irrational but sexualized Susan? Should wild creatures be extracted and domesticated from colonized jungles? And does reconstructed nature trump the natural landscape of the gendered body?

=== Use of gay ===
It has been debated whether Bringing Up Baby is the first fictional work (apart from pornography) to use the word gay in a homosexual context. In one scene, Cary Grant's character is wearing a woman's marabou-trimmed negligee; when asked why, he replies exasperatedly "Because I just went gay all of a sudden!" (leaping into the air at the word gay). As the term gay was not widely familiar to the general public until the Stonewall riots in 1969, it is questioned whether the word is used by Grant in its original sense (meaning carefree or uninhibited) or is an intentional, joking reference to homosexuality.

The line in the film was an ad-lib by Grant, and was not in the script. According to Vito Russo in The Celluloid Closet (1981, revised 1987), the script originally had Grant's character say "I...I suppose you think it's odd, my wearing this. I realize it looks odd...I don't usually...I mean, I don't own one of these". Russo suggests that this indicates that people in Hollywood (at least in Grant's circles) were familiar with the slang connotations of the word; however, there is no record that Grant or anyone involved with the film ever discussed the matter publicly.

== Legacy ==
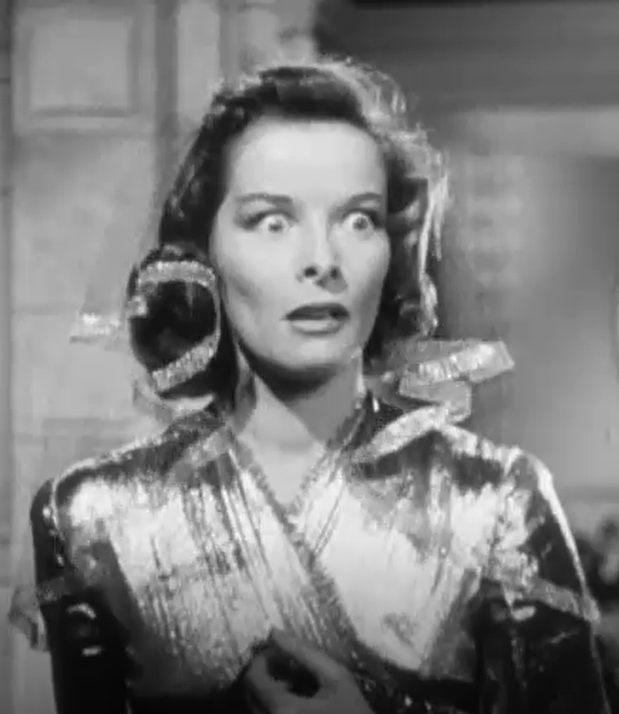
Hepburn's character in Bringing Up Baby has been cited as an early example of the Manic Pixie Dream Girl archetype.

Following Bringing Up Baby, Grant and Hepburn would collaborate again on Holiday (1938) and The Philadelphia Story (1940). These three films belong to a sub-genre of screwball comedy known as the comedy of remarriage, described by philosopher Stanley Cavell as Hollywood's crowning achievement. Cavell noted that Bringing Up Baby was made in a tradition of romantic comedy that harked back to ancient Rome and Shakespeare. In particular, Shakespeare's Much Ado About Nothing and As You Like It have been cited as an influence on the film and on screwball comedy in general, with their "haughty, self-sufficient men, strong women and fierce combat of words and wit." Hepburn's character has been cited as an early example of the Manic Pixie Dream Girl film archetype.

The popularity of Bringing Up Baby increased after it was shown on television during the 1950s, and by the 1960s film analysts (including the writers at Cahiers du Cinema in France) affirmed its quality. In a rebuttal of fellow New York Times critic Nugent's scathing review at the time of release, A. O. Scott has said that you'll "find yourself amazed at its freshness, its vigor, and its brilliance—qualities undiminished after sixty-five years, and likely to withstand repeated viewings." Leonard Maltin stated that it is now "considered the definitive screwball comedy, and one of the fastest, funniest films ever made; grand performances by all."

Bringing Up Baby has been adapted several times. Hawks recycled the nightclub scene in which Hepburn's dress is torn and Grant walks behind her in the 1964 comedy, Man's Favorite Sport. Peter Bogdanovich's 1972 film What's Up, Doc?, starring Barbra Streisand, was intended as a homage to Bringing Up Baby, and has contributed to its reputation. The coat-ripping scene in What's Up, Doc? was based on the scene in which Grant's coat and Hepburn's dress are torn in Bringing Up Baby. The 1987 film Who's That Girl?, starring Madonna, is also loosely based on Bringing Up Baby, while the 1985 French film One Woman or Two, starring Gérard Depardieu, is a rework of the film.

In 1990 Bringing Up Baby was selected for preservation in the National Film Registry of the Library of Congress as "culturally, historically, or aesthetically significant". Entertainment Weekly voted the film 24th on its list of greatest films. In 2000, readers of Total Film magazine voted it the 47th-greatest comedy film of all time. Premiere ranked Cary Grant's performance as Dr. David Huxley 68th on its list of 100 all-time greatest performances, and ranked Susan Vance 21st on its list of 100 all-time greatest movie characters.

The American Film Institute has ranked Bringing Up Baby 88th on its 100 greatest American films of all time list, and named it the 14th-funniest American film of all time. It was also ranked 51st on the 100 Passions list, and nominated for the AFI's 10 Top 10 romantic comedy list, as was the quote "It isn't that I don't like you, Susan, because after all, in moments of quiet, I'm strangely drawn toward you; but, well, there haven't been any quiet moments." for the AFI's 100 Years...100 Movie Quotes list. The National Society of Film Critics also included Bringing Up Baby on their "100 Essential Films", considering it to be arguably Howard Hawks's best film. In the Sight and Sound 2022 critic's poll, the film was ranked at number 108, tied with Wild Strawberries, Touch of Evil, The Man Who Shot Liberty Valance, and The Wizard of Oz.

== See also ==
- List of cult films
- List of films featuring dinosaurs
- Manic pixie dream girl
