= The Smart Set (film) =

1928 film by Jack Conway

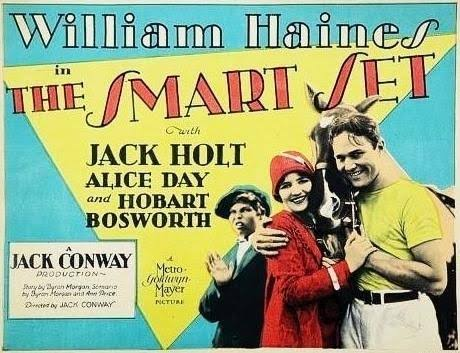
- Directed by: Jack Conway
- Written by: Byron Morgan; Robert Hopkins (intertitles)
- Produced by: Louis B. Mayer; Irving Thalberg
- Starring: William Haines
- Cinematography: Oliver T. Marsh
- Edited by: Sam Zimbalist
- Distributed by: Metro-Goldwyn-Mayer
- Release date: March 24, 1928
- Running time: 7 reels
- Country: United States
- Languages: Silent; English intertitles

The Smart Set (1928) is a silent film released by Metro-Goldwyn-Mayer, directed by Jack Conway, and starring William Haines, Jack Holt, and Alice Day.

== Cast ==
- William Haines as Tommy
- Jack Holt as Nelson
- Alice Day as Polly
- Hobart Bosworth as Durant
- Coy Watson, Jr. as Sammy
- Constance Howard as Cynthia
- Paul Nicholson as Mr. Van Buren
- Julia Swayne Gordon as Mrs. Van Buren

== Plot ==
A self-centered polo player (Haines) has to redeem himself after he is kicked off the U.S. team.
