= The Killer (1921 film) =

Silent film

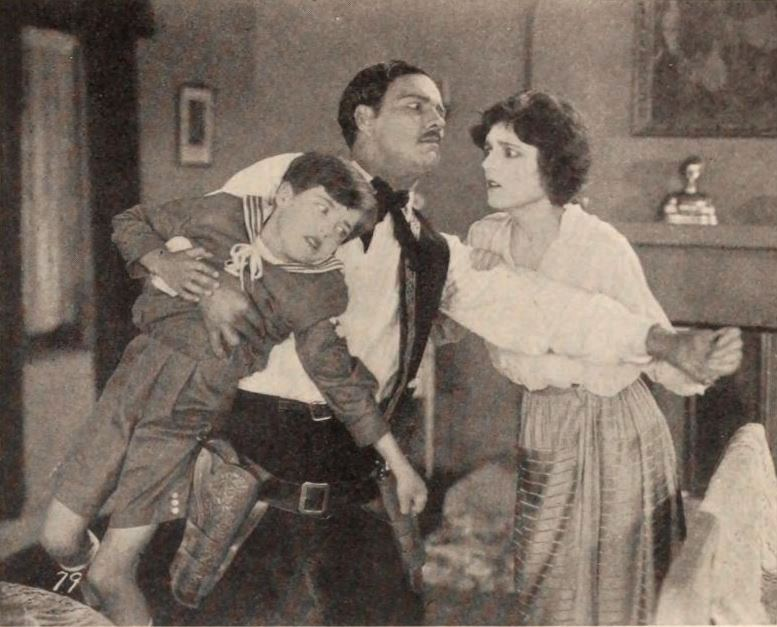
- Directed by: Jack Conway; Howard C. Hickman
- Written by: Stewart Edward White (novel); Richard Schayer
- Starring: Claire Adams; Jack Conway; Frankie Lee
- Cinematography: Enrique Juan Vallejo
- Production company: Benjamin B. Hampton Productions
- Distributed by: Pathé Exchange
- Release date: January 30, 1921
- Country: United States
- Languages: Silent; English intertitles

The Killer is a 1921 American silent Western film directed by Jack Conway and Howard C. Hickman and starring Claire Adams, Jack Conway and Frankie Lee.

== Plot ==
After being charged with murder, Henry Hooper flees to the border zone of Arizona and Sonora. Hooper successfully lures his former business partner John Emory and his children Ruth and Bobby to him. Once the Emorys arrive, Hooper has his henchman Ramon kill John and destroy their business papers. The children are rescued by the rancher William Sanborn, while Hooper is killed.

== Cast ==
- Claire Adams as Ruth Emory
- Jack Conway as William Sanborn
- Frankie Lee as Bobby Emory
- Frank Campeau as Henry Hooper
- Tod Sloan as Artie Brower
- Edward Peil Sr. as Ramon
- Frank Hayes as Windy Smith
- Will Walling as John Emory
- Milton Ross as Buck Johnson
- Tom Ricketts as Tim Westmore
- Zack Williams as Aloysius Jackson

== Bibliography ==
- Goble, Alan. The Complete Index to Literary Sources in Film. Walter de Gruyter, 1999.
