= The Millionaire (1921 film) =

1921 film

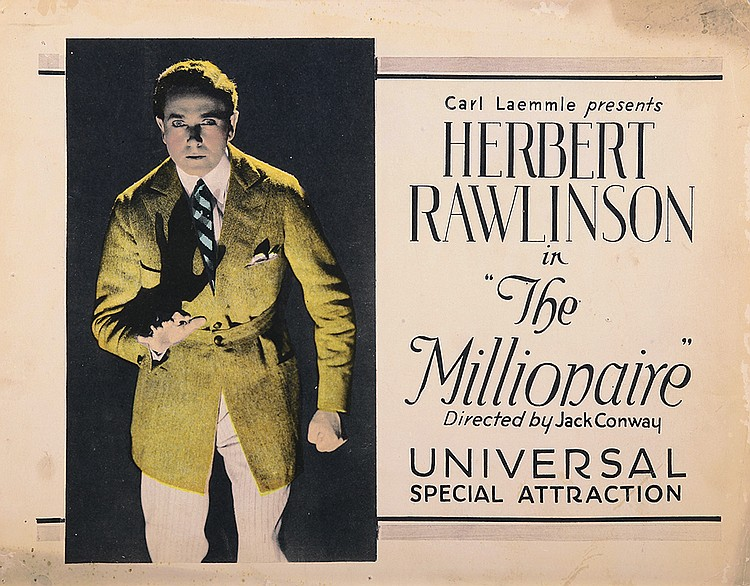
- Directed by: Jack Conway
- Written by: Wallace Clifton; Hulbert Footner
- Produced by: Carl Laemmle
- Starring: Herbert Rawlinson; Bert Roach; William Courtright
- Cinematography: Enrique Juan Vallejo
- Production company: Universal Pictures
- Distributed by: Universal Pictures
- Release date: November 14, 1921
- Running time: 5 reels
- Country: United States
- Languages: Silent; English intertitles

The Millionaire is a 1921 American silent drama film directed by Jack Conway and starring Herbert Rawlinson, Bert Roach and William Courtright.

== Cast ==
- Herbert Rawlinson as Jack Norman
- Bert Roach as Bobo Harmsworth
- William Courtright as Simon Fisher
- Verne Winter as Jimmy
- Lillian Rich as Kate Blair
- Margaret Mann as Grandmother
- Frederick Vroom as Delmar
- Mary Huntress as Mrs. Clever
- Doris Pawn as Marion Culbreth
- E. Alyn Warren as Evers

== Bibliography ==
- James Robert Parish & Michael R. Pitts. Film directors: a guide to their American films. Scarecrow Press, 1974.
