= Soul Mates (1925 film) =

1925 film

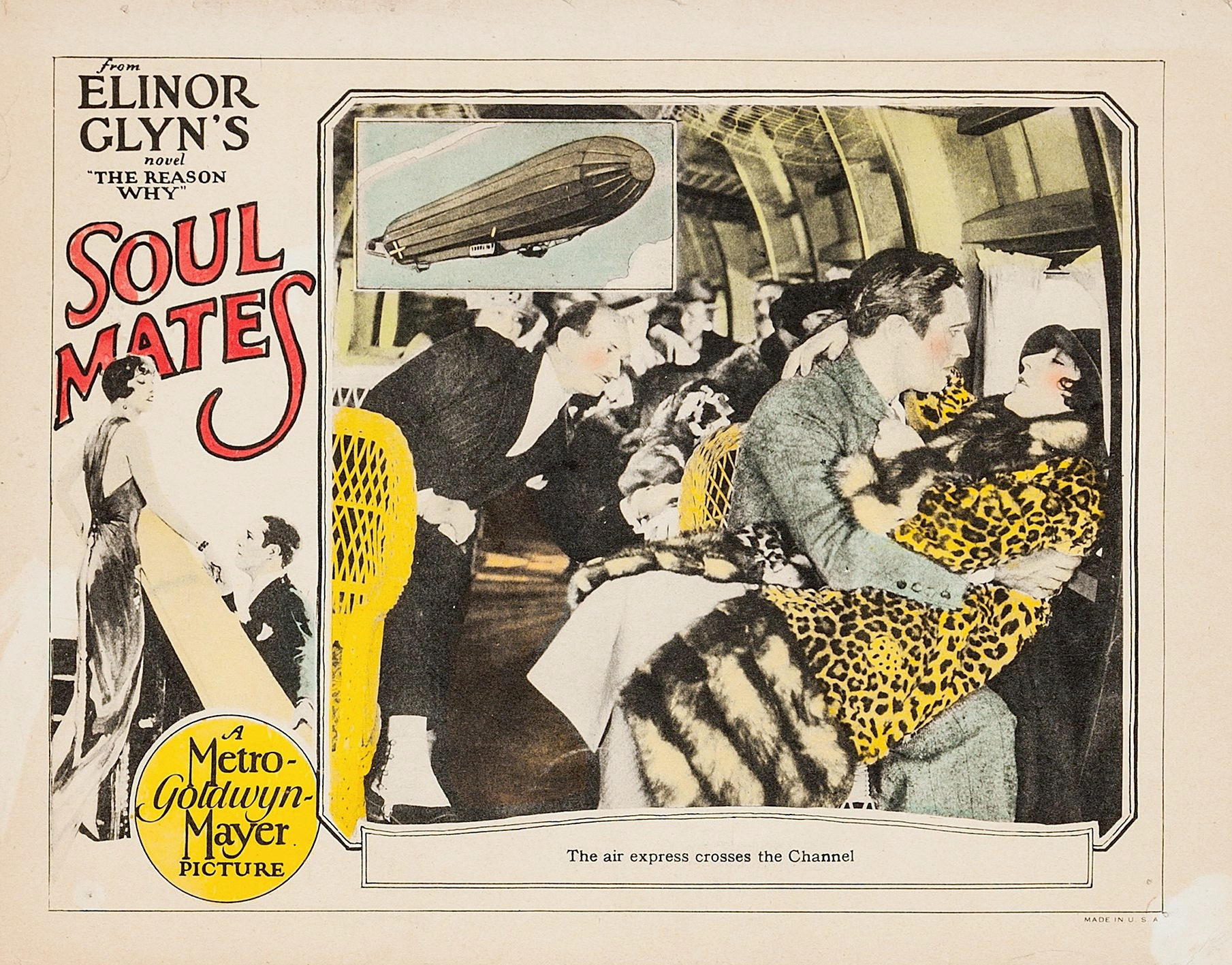
- Lobby card
- Directed by: Jack Conway
- Written by: Joseph Farnham; Carey Wilson
- Based on: The Reason Why by Elinor Glyn
- Starring: Aileen Pringle
- Cinematography: Oliver T. Marsh
- Edited by: James C. McKay
- Distributed by: Metro-Goldwyn-Mayer
- Release date: December 20, 1925
- Running time: 60 minutes
- Country: United States
- Language: Silent (English intertitles)

Soul Mates is a surviving 1925 American silent drama film directed by Jack Conway, based on the 1911 novel The Reason Why by Elinor Glyn. The movie was the second successful collaboration between Glyn and Conway.

The film's sets were designed by the art director James Basevi.

== Plot ==
Velma is a good little rich girl whose indomitable uncle orders her to wed Lord Tancred, a man she has never met. The same day, she becomes infatuated by a man she meets on the street, not knowing that it is Lord Tancred. When she finds out about his true identity, she becomes convinced he wants to marry her for monetary reasons. She feels betrayed and refuses to speak to him, until she makes an unusual discovery.

== Cast ==
- Aileen Pringle as Velma
- Edmund Lowe as Lord Tancred
- Phillips Smalley as Markrute
- Tony D'Algy as Velma's brother
- Edythe Chapman as Tancred's mother
- Mary Hawes as Velma's maid
- Catherine Bennett as Dolly
- Lucien Littlefield as Stevens
- Ned Sparks as Tancred's chauffeur

== Preservation status ==
Soul Mates was saved by MGM with a preservation print, probably located at the George Eastman House.
