= The Heart Buster =

1924 film

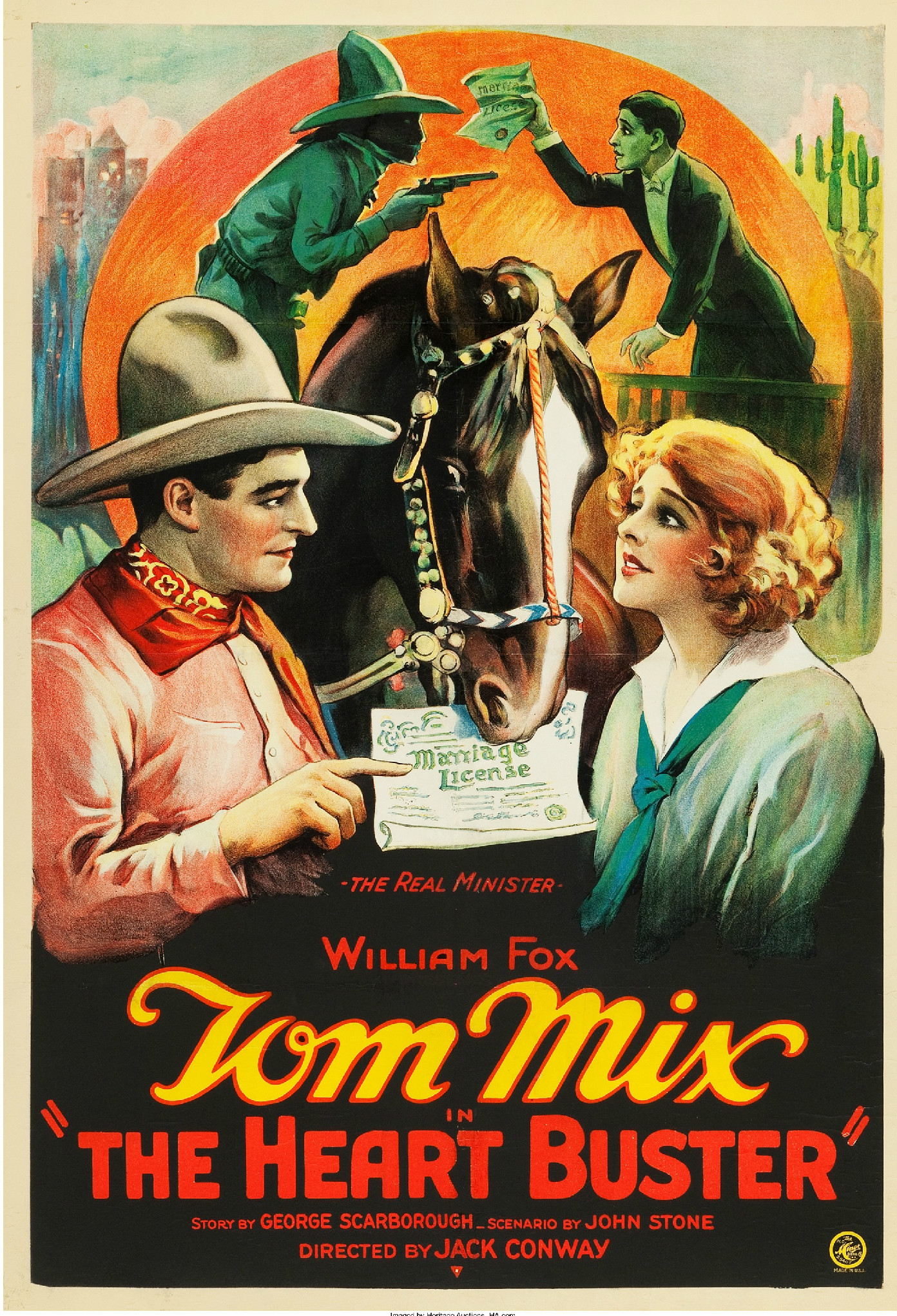
- Poster
- Directed by: Jack Conway
- Written by: John Stone
- Based on: "The Love Bandit" by George Scarborough
- Produced by: William Fox
- Starring: Tom Mix; Esther Ralston
- Cinematography: Daniel B. Clark
- Distributed by: Fox Film
- Release date: July 6, 1924
- Running time: 5 reels
- Country: United States
- Languages: Silent; English intertitles

The Heart Buster is a lost 1924 American silent Western film directed by Jack Conway and starring Tom Mix and Esther Ralston. It was produced by and distributed by Fox Film Corporation.

== Cast ==
- Tom Mix as Tod Walton
- Tony the Horse as Tony
- Esther Ralston as Rose Hillyer
- Cyril Chadwick as Edward Gordon
- William Courtright as Justice of the Peace
- Frank Currier as John Hillyer
- Tom Wilson as George
