= Love Crazy (1941 film) =

1941 film by Jack Conway

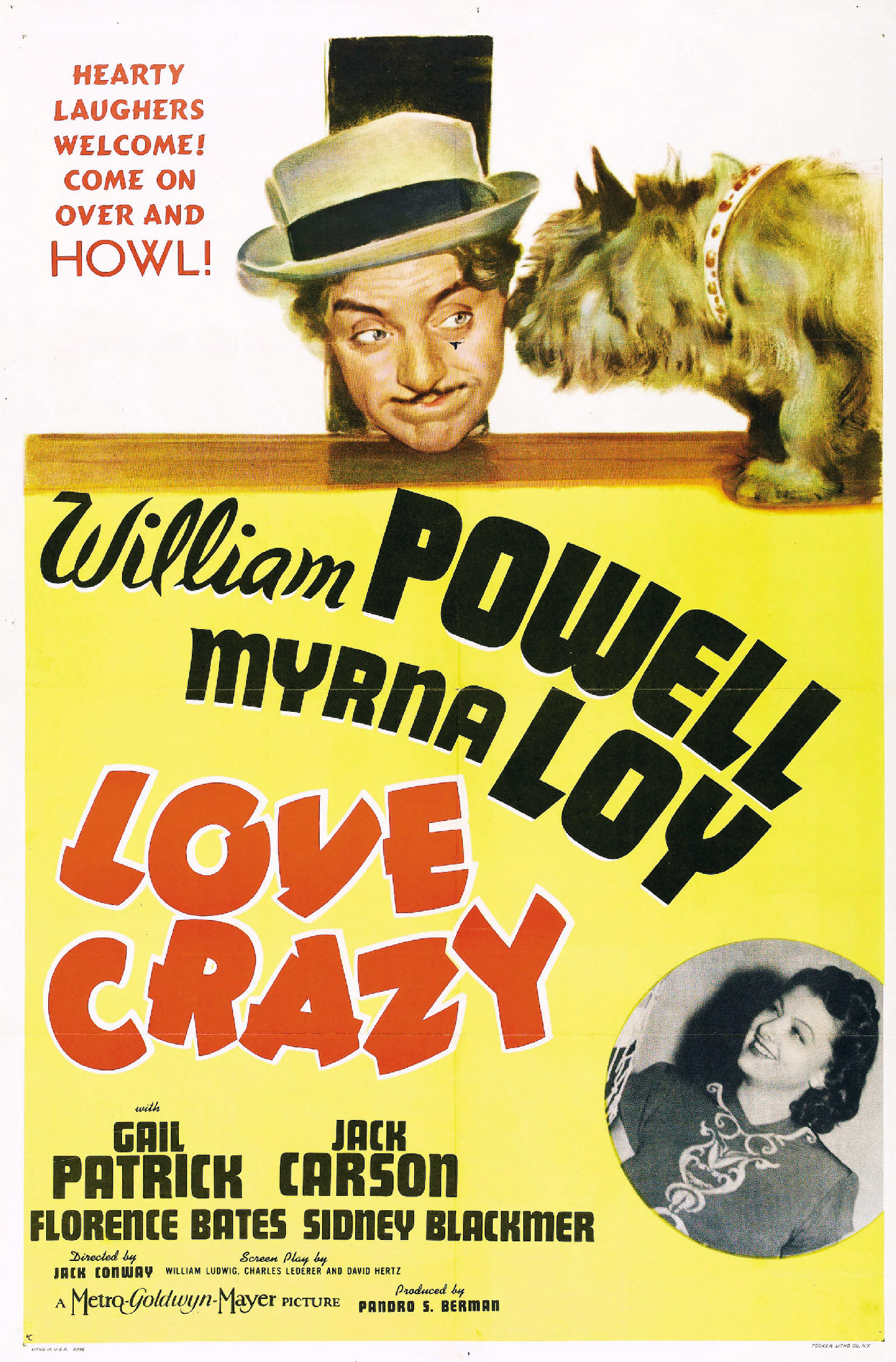
- Theatrical film poster
- Directed by: Jack Conway
- Screenplay by: David Hertz; William Ludwig; Charles Lederer
- Story by: David Hertz; William Ludwig
- Produced by: Pandro S. Berman
- Starring: William Powell; Myrna Loy; Gail Patrick; Jack Carson
- Cinematography: Ray June; William H. Daniels (uncredited)
- Edited by: Ben Lewis
- Music by: David Snell
- Production company: Metro-Goldwyn-Mayer
- Distributed by: Loew's Inc.
- Release date: May 23, 1941
- Running time: 99 minutes
- Country: United States
- Language: English
- Budget: $889,000
- Box office: $2 million

Love Crazy is a 1941 American screwball comedy film directed by Jack Conway and starring William Powell, Myrna Loy and Gail Patrick. Powell and Loy play a couple whose marriage is on the verge of being broken up by the husband's old girlfriend and the wife's disapproving mother. This was the eleventh of fourteen films in which they appeared together. The supporting cast includes Jack Carson and Sig Ruman.

== Plot ==
Architect Steve Ireland and his wife Susan eagerly look forward to their fourth wedding anniversary, but her mother Mrs. Cooper shows up and puts a damper on their eccentric and jokey plans for the evening: their personal recreation of a Baffin Island Inuit ritual, this year done backwards. Instead, Mrs. Cooper sends Steve to mail her insurance premium, having sprained her foot.

Downstairs he runs into his old girlfriend Isobel Kimble Grayson and learns that she has just moved into the same apartment building, one floor below. On the way up, the elevator gets stuck. While they are climbing out Steve is half-strangled and struck several times in the head becoming woozy. Isobel takes him to her apartment to recover where she plies him with numerous strong drinks. Though she is now also married, she makes it clear that she would not mind renewing their relationship, but Steve is hopelessly in love with his wife.

When he returns to his apartment in a disheveled state, he neglects to mention his encounter with Isobel. However, this becomes very evident when her shoes are found in his jacket pockets, taken when he helped her up out of the elevator, and it looks bad for him; later, while Susan is running an errand for her mother across town, Steve skips out from the dull chore of minding Mrs. Cooper on a pretext to talk to Isobel. However Mrs. Cooper finds out and tells her daughter, putting Steve in an awkward spot. Now jealous, for revenge, Susan calls Isobel's husband 'Pinky' and suggests that they pretend that they are seeing each other. He agrees, but Susan goes to the wrong apartment, that of world champion archer Ward Willoughby. He is puzzled but has no objection to being romanced by a beautiful woman. When Susan learns her mistake, she has difficulty extricating herself from Willoughby's apartment. They are seen by Steve and Isobel, resulting in much confusion. Things are finally cleared up, but then Susan is led to believe that, while she was out, Steve was alone with Isobel in her apartment for three hours, which could only mean one thing.

Susan decides to get a divorce, despite Steve's pleas. She hides from him in Arizona with her meddling mother. Willoughby follows, hoping to better his acquaintance with Susan. The night before the divorce hearing, Steve's lawyer, George Renny, spots Susan at a party and tells his client. Steve crashes the gathering, but is unable to change Susan's mind. A chance remark by Steve gives Renny an idea – a divorce can be delayed if one of the parties is insane. Steve does his best to act nutty, even pushing his mother-in-law into the pool. However, he had been so eccentric in the past, that everyone (with the exception of one stranger, an older man) just believes he is drunk.

Nonetheless, Renny gets the divorce judge to agree to a thirty-day delay to have Steve examined by the City Lunacy Commission. When he realizes that he has gone too far, Steve tries to convince the members that he is sane; but the head of the board, Dr. Klugle, turns out to be the one person Steve hoodwinked at the party. As a result, he is committed to a sanitarium.

Steve escapes by tricking the head of the psychiatric hospital, Dr. Wuthering, leaving him stuck upside-down in a net hanging from a tree. He returns to his apartment building one step ahead of the police, who now consider him a homicidal maniac. Steve dodges Willoughby and hides with Isobel's help. He then disguises himself as his "sister" by putting on some clothes from Isobel's apartment and shaving his mustache. He finally reaches Susan, only to have Mrs. Cooper and Willoughby show up soon afterwards. When Mrs. Cooper inadvertently confirms Steve left the apartment building to just talk to Isobel at a public bar down the street on the night of their anniversary, Susan finally believes her husband and decides to bunk-in with the "sister" and take "her" to Saskatchewan in the morning.

== Cast ==
- William Powell as Steve Ireland
- Myrna Loy as Susan Ireland
- Gail Patrick as Isobel Kimble Grayson
- Jack Carson as Ward Willoughby
- Florence Bates as Mrs. Cooper
- Sidney Blackmer as George Renny
- Sig Ruman as Dr. Wuthering, the head of the sanitarium
- Vladimir Sokoloff as Dr. David Klugle
- Donald MacBride as "Pinky" Grayson
- Sara Haden as Cecilia Landis
- Kathleen Lockhart as Mrs. Bristol
- Fern Emmett as Martha, the Irelands' maid
- Elisha Cook, Jr. as Elevator Operator

== Reception ==
In 1941, Variety called it "another marital comedy loaded with solid comedy, compactly set up and tempoed at a zippy pace. Love Crazy is a standout laugh hit of top proportions, a happy successor to previous Powell-Loy teamings."

In 2001, TV Guide rated it 4 out of 5 stars.

According to MGM records, the film earned $1,335,000 in the US and Canada and $725,000 elsewhere resulting in a profit of $514,000.

== Radio adaptation ==
Love Crazy was presented on Screen Directors Playhouse August 19, 1949. Powell starred in the adaptation.
