= Jack Conway (filmmaker) =

American film director and actor (1886-1952)

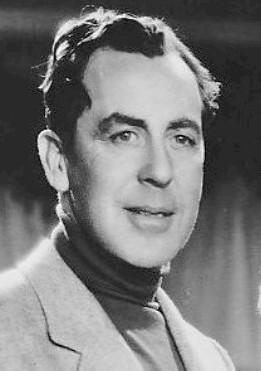
- Conway in 1937
- Born: Hugh Ryan Conway; July 17, 1886; Graceville, Minnesota, US
- Died: October 11, 1952 (aged 66); Pacific Palisades, Los Angeles, California, U.S.
- Occupations: Actor; director; producer
- Years active: 1909–1948
- Spouse(s): Viola Barry (1911–1918) (divorced) 2 children Virginia Bushman (1926–1952) (his death) 2 children

Hugh Ryan "Jack" Conway (July 17, 1886 – October 11, 1952) was an American film director and film producer, as well as an actor of many films in the first half of the 20th century.

Conway and director Edmund Goulding share the distinction of directing the most Best Picture-nominated films without ever being nominated for Best Director, with three apiece. Conway's nominated films were Viva Villa!, A Tale of Two Cities, and Libeled Lady.

== Early life and career ==
Conway was born as Hugh Ryan Conway on July 17, 1886, in Graceville, Minnesota, United States. He began his career as an actor, joining a repertory theater group shortly after graduating from high school. He later moved into film acting and, in 1911, became a member of D.W. Griffith’s stock company, where he appeared primarily in Westerns and gained experience in early film production techniques.

He briefly achieved recognition as a film actor with The Valley of the Moon (1914). During the 1910s, Conway transitioned from acting to directing, beginning a long career behind the camera in the American film industry.

== Director ==
Four years later, he made his mark as a director and gained valuable experience at Universal (1916–17 and 1921–23).

Conway made Quicksands (1923) written by Howard Hawks. He did some films for Fox, The Roughneck (1924) with George O'Brien, The Hunted Woman (1925) and two with Tom Mix, The Heart Buster (1924) The Trouble Shooter (1924).

== MGM ==
Conway moved to MGM in 1925. He made two films with Elinor Glyn, Soul Mates (1925) and The Only Thing (1925).

Conway directed films with MGM's top stars - William Haines (Brown of Harvard, Alias Jimmy Valentine, The Smart Set), John Gilbert (Twelve Miles Out), Joan Crawford (The Understanding Heart, Untamed, Our Modern Maidens ), Lon Chaney (While the City Sleeps, The Unholy Three) and Marie Dressler (Bringing Up Father).

Conway directed Viva Villa!, a hit MGM film starring Wallace Beery that was nominated for four Academy Awards. In his most famous film, A Tale of Two Cities (1935), he used 17,000 extras for the Paris mob scenes alone. This spectacular adaptation of the Dickens classic is still regarded by many as the definitive screen version.

One New York Night (1935) was a little-remembered comedy with Franchot Tone but the sophisticated all-star comedy Libeled Lady (1936) was a huge hit, with the New York Times reviewer commenting on Conway's "agile direction". It starred Harlow, William Powell, Myrna Loy and Spencer Tracy.

Saratoga (1937) with Clark Gable and Jean Harlow was very popular, in part due to publicity arising from the fact Harlow died during filming. Conway went into another film with Gable, Too Hot to Handle (1938) co starring Myrna Loy and Spencer Tracy.

He went to England to make A Yank at Oxford (1938) with Robert Taylor. Star and director were reunited in Lady of the Tropics (1938) with Hedy Lamarr. Let Freedom Ring (1939) was a Western with Nelson Eddy, then Conway had a big hit with Boom Town (1940) starring Gable, Claudette Colbert, Tracy and Lamar.

Honky Tonk (1941), with Gable and Turner, was another big hit as was Love Crazy (1941) with Powell and Loy and Crossroads (1942), a thriller with Powell and Lamar.

Conway made some war films - Assignment in Brittany (1943) with Jean Pierre Aumont and Dragon Seed (1944) with Katharine Hepburn. He did some uncredited directing on Desire Me (1947) a huge flop with Greer Garson. The Hucksters (1947) with Gable, Ava Gardner and Deborah Kerr was very popular. Less so was High Barbaree (1947) with Van Johnson and June Allyson. Conway's last film was Julia Misbehaves (1948), a popular comedy with Garson.

== Private life ==
His first marriage was to silent film actress Viola Barry. Together, they had two children, including writer Rosemary Conway. His second marriage was to Virginia Bushman, daughter of silent screen star Francis X. Bushman. They had two children, as well, including the actor Pat Conway. They resided in Pacific Palisades, California, in a house designed by architect Allen Siple (1900–1973). A street in Pacific Palisades, Jacon Way, is named for Conway. He retired from films in 1948 and died four years later at his home from pulmonary disease.

Conway was a registered Republican and a member of the America First Committee. He supported Robert A. Taft in 1952. At Conway's funeral, Spencer Tracy read the eulogy while Conway's pallbearers included Robert Z. Leonard, Edward Sutherland, Eddie Mannix, and John Lee Mahin.

== Appraisal ==
According to critic Andrew Sarris, Conway "was submerged in the Metro studio system, and few of his films are worth mentioning even in passing, but there are moments of enchantment" although "Most of the enchantment can be attributed to... acting luminaries."

Gloria Swanson wrote in her memoirs " Making a film with Jack Conway was like going to an elegant party every day." She also described him:

He was tall and lean, with blue eyes and wavy hair and a marvelous smile... He seemed to possess everything I thought of as refined and stylish behavior. He was like that man women in fashion magazines always had by the arm, the kind of man who automatically had a manicure when he had a haircut.

== Filmography ==
=== Director ===
- Her Indian Hero (1912, short)
- House of Pride (1912, short)
- His Only Son (1912, short)
- In the Long Run (1912, short)
- The Struggle (1913, short)
- When Sherman Marched to the Sea (1913, short)
- The Wrong Prescription (1914, short)
- The Old Fisherman's Story (1914, short)
- The Penitentes (1915)
- Bitter Sweet (1916, short)
- The Mainspring (1916)
- The Measure of a Man (1916)
- The Social Buccaneer (1916)
- The Beckoning Trail (1916)
- The Silent Battle (1916)
- Because of a Woman (1917)
- Bond of Fear (1917)
- The Charmer (1917)
- Come Through (1917)
- A Jewel in Pawn (1917)
- Polly Redhead (1917)
- The Little Orphan (1917)
- Her Soul's Inspiration (1917)
- A Diplomatic Mission (1918)
- Desert Law (1918)
- Her Decision (1918)
- Little Red Decides (1918)
- You Can't Believe Everything (1918)
- Lombardi, Ltd. (1919)
- The U.P. Trail (1920)
- The Dwelling Place of Light (1920)
- Riders of the Dawn (1920)
- The Money Changers (1920)
- A Daughter of the Law (1921)
- The Millionaire (1921)
- The Rage of Paris (1921)
- The Kiss (1921)
- The Servant in the House (1921)
- The Killer (1921)
- The Spenders (1921)
- Across the Deadline (1922)
- Another Man's Shoes (1922)
- The Long Chance (1922)
- Don't Shoot (1922)
- Step on It! (1922)
- Lucretia Lombard (1923)
- Sawdust (1923)
- What Wives Want (1923)
- Trimmed in Scarlet (1923)
- The Prisoner (1923)
- Quicksands (1923)
- The Roughneck (1924)
- The Heart Buster (1924)
- The Trouble Shooter (1924)
- Soul Mates (1925)
- The Only Thing (1925)
- The Hunted Woman (1925)
- Brown of Harvard (1926)
- Twelve Miles Out (1927)
- The Understanding Heart (1927)
- Alias Jimmy Valentine (1928)
- While the City Sleeps (1928)
- The Smart Set (1928)
- Bringing Up Father (1928)
- Untamed (1929)
- Our Modern Maidens (1929) (Also producer)
- The Unholy Three (1930)
- They Learned About Women (1930)
- New Moon (1930)
- Just a Gigolo (1931) (Also producer)
- The Easiest Way (1931)
- Red-Headed Woman (1932)
- But the Flesh Is Weak (1932)
- Arsène Lupin (1932)
- The Solitaire Man (1933)
- The Nuisance (1933)
- Hell Below (1933) (Also producer)
- The Gay Bride (1934)
- The Girl from Missouri (1934) (Also producer)
- Tarzan and His Mate (1934)
- Viva Villa! (1934)
- A Tale of Two Cities (1935)
- One New York Night (1935)
- Libeled Lady (1936)
- Saratoga (1937)
- Too Hot to Handle (1938)
- A Yank at Oxford (1938)
- Lady of the Tropics (1939)
- Let Freedom Ring (1939)
- Boom Town (1940)
- Honky Tonk (1941)
- Love Crazy (1941)
- Crossroads (1942)
- Assignment in Brittany (1943)
- Dragon Seed (1944)
- Desire Me (1947)
- The Hucksters (1947)
- High Barbaree (1947)
- Julia Misbehaves (1948)

=== Actor ===
- Roof Tops of Manhattan (1935)
- The Killer (1921)
- A Royal Democrat (1919)
- Restless Souls (1919)
- The Little Orphan (1917)
- Macbeth (1916)
- Bitter Sweet (1916)
- Big Jim's Heart (1915)
- Added Fuel (1915)
- Captain Macklin (1915)
- The Outcast (1915)
- What Might Have Been (1915)
- The Wrong Prescription (1914)
- The Wireless Voice (1914)
- Burning Daylight: The Adventures of 'Burning Daylight' in Alaska (1914)
- Valley of the Moon (1914)
- The Chechako (1914)
- The Old Maid (1914)
- The Claim Jumper (1913)
- In the End (1913)
- Patsy's Luck (1913)
- The Trail of the Lonesome Mine (1913)
- Good-for-Nothing Jack (1913)
- The Struggle (1913)
- Soldiers Three (1913)
- Birds of Prey (1913)
- When Sherman Marched to the Sea (1913)
- Brought to Bay (1913)
- A Child of War (1913)
- Will o' the Wisp (1913)
- The Twelfth Juror (1913)
- When Lincoln Paid (1913)
- The Old Armchair (1913)
- The Civilian (1912)
- His Only Son (1912)
- The Boomerang (1912)
- Sundered Ties (1912)
- Uncle Bill (1912)
- The Alibi (1912)
- How Steve Made Good (1912)
- The Obligation (1912)
- The Soldier Brothers of Susanna (1912)
- The Undoing of Slim Bill (1912)
- The Bugler of Battery B (1912)
- A Gentleman of Fortune (1912)
- Hard Luck Bill (1912)
- The Land of Might (1912)
- The Squatter's Child (1912)
- The Mountain Daisy (1912)
- The Scalawag (1912)
- The Sheriff's Round-Up (1912)
- The Counting of Time (1912)
- The Thespian Bandit (1912)
- The Everlasting Judy (1912)
- The Post Telegrapher (1912)
- The Little Nugget (1912)
- The Love Trail (1912)
- Her Indian Hero (1912)
- Two Men and the Law (1912)
- Across the Sierras (1912)
- A Pair of Jacks (1912)
- The Fighting Chance (1912)
- The Battle of the Red Men (1912)
- The Empty Water Keg (1912)
- George Warrington's Escape (1911)
- A Painter's Idyl (1911)
- Coals of Fire (1911)
- John Oakhurst, Gambler (1911)
- Arizona Bill (1911)
- The Voyager: A Tale of Old Canada (1911)
- Kit Carson's Wooing (1911)
- The Totem Mark (1911)
- The Sheriff of Tuolomne (1911)
- Her Indian Mother (1910)
- The Indian Scout's Vengeance (1910)
- The Old Soldier's Story (1909)
