= Rockwell Museum =

Museum in Corning, New York

The Rockwell Museum
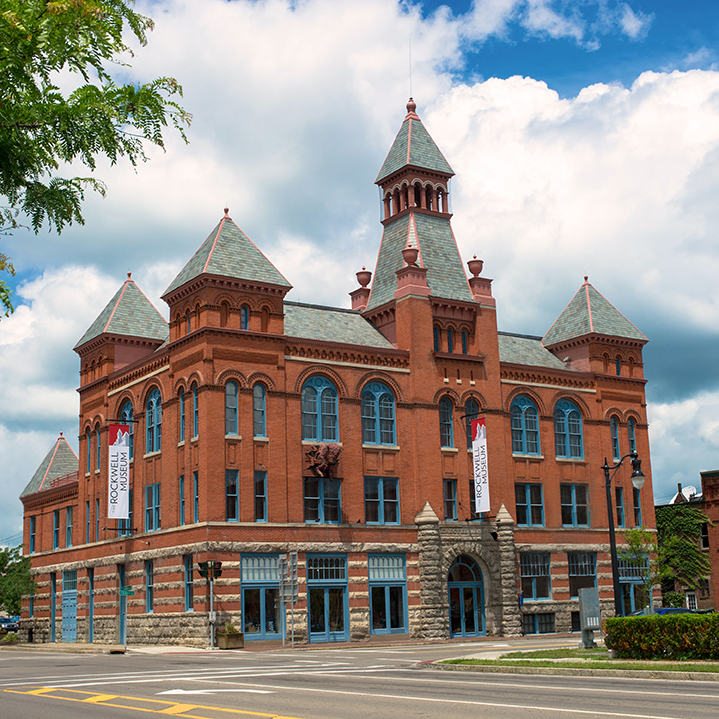
- The Rockwell Museum, 2015

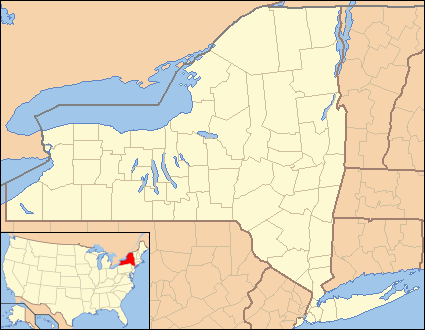
- Location within New York
- Established: 1976
- Location: Corning, New York, U.S.
- Coordinates: 42.14278°N 77.05290°W
- Type: Art museum
- Accreditation: American Association of Museums, Smithsonian Affiliate
- Key holdings: Albert Bierstadt's Mount Whitney
- Collections: American art, Native American art
- Collection size: 2,200+
- Visitors: Approximately 48,000 per year
- Founders: Bob and Hertha Rockwell
- Director: Erin M. Coe
- Parking: On site, behind building (no charge to park)
- Website: rockwellmuseum.org

The Rockwell Museum is a Smithsonian Affiliate museum of American art located in the Southern Tier region of New York in downtown Corning, New York. Frommer's describes it as "one of the best-designed small museums in the Northeast." In 2015, The Rockwell Museum was named a Smithsonian Affiliate, the first in New York State outside of New York City.

== History ==
=== The Rockwell Family ===
The museum founder, Robert F. Rockwell, Jr., moved to Corning in 1933 to run his grandfather's department store. Rockwell bought his first Western painting in 1959. Over the next 25 years he amassed a significant collection of paintings, bronze sculptures, etchings and drawings, and Native American ethnographic materials. Another collecting interest for Rockwell developed from his longtime friendship with Frederick Carder, founder of the Steuben Glass Works. He and his wife, Hertha, accumulated more than 2,500 pieces of Carder Steuben glass. In addition, they assembled a small collection of antique toys.

=== Institutional Timeline ===
==== Opening The Rockwell Museum ====
From 1960 to 1975, Bob Rockwell's growing collection of art was displayed to the public in the Rockwell Department Store on Market Street in Corning, New York. In 1973, Corning Glass Works executives Amory Houghton, Jr., Thomas S. Buechner, and George W. Douglas pledged company support to provide a proper home for the Rockwell's collection of western art and artifacts, Carder Steuben glass, and turn-of-the-century toys. The plan was to restore and renovate City Hall as the home for the collections as the company's bicentennial gift to the community and as a major tourist attraction.

The museum opened under the name The Rockwell-Corning Museum in the Baron Steuben Hotel on November 13, 1976. In 1981, the name of the museum was changed to The Rockwell Museum.

==== Move to Old City Hall ====
In 1980, The City of Corning offered its former 1893 City Hall, placed on the National Register of Historic Places in 1976, to house the Museum collections. Corning Glass Works funded the substantial exterior and interior renovation costs. On June 19, 1982, the museum re-opened as The Rockwell Museum in the restored Old City Hall.

In 1991, The Museums West consortium was established and the Rockwell Museum was a founding member. In 1995, The museum was awarded accreditation by the American Association of Museums, and subsequently awarded in 2005.

==== Renovations ====
In 2000, the museum was focused on becoming "The Best of the West in the East" and closed in August for a complete interior renovation led by ABC Architects and Planners, under the direction of James Vincent Czajka, AIA New York Chapter. Renovation costs were underwritten by Corning Incorporated. The museum reopened as the Rockwell Museum of Western Art on May 18, 2001, and celebrated its 25th anniversary.

==== Re-imagined Museum ====
In July 2014, the name was shortened again to The Rockwell Museum. With sponsorship from LeChase Construction, a Family Exploration Studio was introduced to the museum experience for hands-on learning. In 2015, The Rockwell Museum was named a Smithsonian Affiliate, the first in New York State outside of New York City.

=== Old City Hall Building History ===
In the Flood of 1972, the basement and much of the ground floor were submerged and suffered extensive damage due to Hurricane Agnes. Despite its condition, the old City Hall was placed on the National Register of Historic Places in 1974. In 1982, it became the permanent home of The Rockwell Museum. The building went through another major renovation early in 2000. In 2002, the building won the American Society of Landscape Architects Merit Award.

Designed by Rochester architect, AJ Warner and built by Corning contractor, Thomas Bradley, the building is Richardsonian Romanesque, a distinctly American style. Building costs were $28,579.50 in 1893. Polychromatic design with local brick & rusticated limestone quarried in Corning. The original bell in the bell tower held 20 weights of 50 lbs. each and is now at the city's current fire station.

From 1893 to 1974, the ground floor was the Corning Fire Station. The first floor had been the main entrance level from the outside stairs. Housed here were the City Clerk, City Court, Police Department and Jail Cells. By 1896, the Police Department was built as a two-story addition at the back of the building with a separate entrance. The second floor held City Council Chambers, Public Health Department, and dentist offices until 1972. The third floor was home to a public library and youth center.

=== Executive Directors ===
Paul E. Rivard: 1975 – 1978

Antony E. Snow: 1978 – 12/1/83

Michael W. Duty: 1/1//84 – 12/31/86

Thomas S. Buechner: 6/26/86 – 12/18/86 (Trustee, acting director)

Dwight P. Lanmon: 12/18/86 – 12/31/87 (Trustee, acting director)

Arthur Townsend: 1/1/88 – 11/29/89

Mercedes C. Skidmore: 12/7/89 – 12/8/90 (acting director)

Kent Ahrens: 12/8/90 – 9/7/95

Richard B. Bessey: July 9, 1995 – January 5, 1997

Stuart A. Chase: January 5, 1997 – January 28, 2002

Kristin A. Swain: January 28, 2002 – July 15, 2002 (acting director)

Kristin A. Swain: July 15, 2002 – December 31, 2016

Brian Lee Whisenhunt: January 1, 2017 - 2024

Erin M. Coe: January 6, 2025 - Current

== Community Partnerships ==
=== Alley Art Project ===
In 2010, the "Alley Art Project" was launched with the mural painting, "The Tree of Life." The Rockwell Education Department partners with the Corning-Painted Post School District High School Learning Center to create student-designed and painted murals that use The Rockwell's own art collection as inspiration. The murals are publicly visible in the alleyways of Corning, NY. The High School Learning Center provides an alternative setting for students who may otherwise be at risk of dropping out of school.

To celebrate the museum's 40th anniversary, The Rockwell and High School partnered with artist Virgil Ortiz. Students studied Ortiz's Ancient Elder sculpture on exhibit at The Rockwell. The sculpture was developed as part of Ortiz's futuristic revolution story taking place in 2180 that restores sacred lands to the Pueblo peoples. Inspired by this work, students created their own "super power" characters who are meant to help bring about critical change, such as equality for all peoples. The mural is located at Cap'n Morgan's on Bridge Street in Corning, NY.

All of the murals can be found on the Corning Public Art Map.

=== Garden of Fire Community Collaborative Summer Program ===
The Rockwell Museum collaborates with several area partners to offer the second phase of the educational Garden of Fire project to regional children during the summer. The program, which was conceived collaboratively by local organizations, focuses on building capacity, depth and the integration of art and science for programs serving youth in Steuben County.

=== Dia de los Muertos ===
During the month of October, middle-school Spanish students from the surrounding area create decorative objects for a Dia de Los Muertos student ofrenda (altar) that is installed in The Rockwell's Student Gallery. The collaboration is celebrated each year with a Dia de los Muertos museum-wide educational event, including music, presentations, and traditional crafts. The Rockwell Museum has celebrated el Dia de los Muertos since 2004.

== Collections ==
The museum houses three floors of works that focus on American art and artifacts, contemporary Native American art and bronze sculptures. Highlights include:

- Albert Bierstadt's "Mount Whitney"
- Ed Mell, "Jack Knife, 1993" Sculpture
- Robb Kendrick Tin Type Portraits
- Frederic Remington's "The Winter Campaign," "The Cheyenne," and "The Arizona Cowboy"
- Ernest Leonard Blumenschein's "Jury for Trail of a Sheepherder for Murder"
- Charles Marion Russell's "A Mix Up," and "One Down, Two to Go"
- Deborah Butterfield bronze
- Ernest Blumenschein's "Jury for a Sheepherder Murder," and "Star Road and White Sun"
- Sydney Laurence's "Mount McKinley," 1922
- Frederick Carder Glass Collection

Other artists in the museum collection include Jaune Quick-to-See Smith, N.C. Wyeth, William R Leigh, Thomas Moran, Cyrus Edwin Dallin, Andy Warhol, and other modern and contemporary artists.

In 2013, Albert Bierstadt's "Mount Whitney" painting received a new frame from Gill & Lagodich Fine Period Frames & Restoration in Manhattan. The new frame is a replica of an 1870s American frame for the museum's centerpiece. Its original frame had greatly deteriorated and was not an American 19th century frame. Another addition to the museum's collection includes the 1993 work by Ed Mell entitled Jack Knife, which is located on the corner of Cedar Street and Denison Parkway.

== Publications ==
1. 1976. The Painter's West. Paul E. Rivard.
2. 1984. Remington's West. Michael Duty.
3. 1986. A Limitless Sky: The West of Charles M. Russell. Ginger Renner with Northland Press.
4. 1987. Photography in the West. Frank Armstrong.
5. 1987. Boundless Realism. Exhibit Catalog. Robert C. Manchester.
6. 1987. Great Paintings of the Old West. Postcards.
7. 1989. American Western Art. Museum Catalog. The Rockwell Staff.
8. 1990. Clyde Aspevig: Field Studies. Thomas Buechner.
9. 1991. Play of Light: Glass Lamps of Frederick Carder. Exhibit Catalog. Thomas Dimitroff.
10. 1993. Collector's Choice Review. Robyn Peterson, ed. Frederick Carder and Steuben Glass.
11. 1993. American Frontier Photography. Robyn Peterson.
12. 1995. Cyrus E. Dallin: His Small Bronzes and Plasters. Kent Ahrens.
13. 1996. Warp and Weft. Exhibit Catalog. Robyn Peterson.
14. 2005. Elemental Solitude. Exhibit Catalog. Shelia K. Hoffman.
15. 2007. Crafted to Perfection. Shelia K. Hoffman.
16. 2016. American Masterworks of Howard Terpning. Kirsty Buchanan.
17. Undated. Carder's Corning. Manuscript by Stanley Weisenfeld. Two volumes and video.
18. 2000. The Rockwell Museum. DVD. Carder Steuben Glass Collection.

== Examples of Exhibits ==
- Lock, Stock & Barrel: Historic firearms from the collection of Robert F. "Bobby" Rockwell III - Exhibition Dates: November 20, 2013 – January 1, 2015
- Painted Journeys: In the Spirit of American West- Exhibition Dates: January 24, 2014 - May 4, 2014
- Untouched by Chaos: Karl Bodmer and the American Wilderness- Exhibition Dates: March 3, 2014 – March 8, 2015
- On Fire: the Nancy & Alan Cameros Collection of Southwestern Pottery- Exhibition Dates: April 8, 2014 – April 1, 2016
- The sculptures of Abraham Anghik Ruben- Exhibition Dates: May 16, 2014- September 7, 2014
- Illustration and Imagination: W.H.D. Koerner's Western Paintings- Exhibition Dates: May 16, 2014 – September 7, 2014
- Harmless Hunter: Charles M. Russell's Wildlife Art- Exhibition Dates: September 19, 2014 – January 4, 2015
- A Feeling of Humanity: Western Art from the Ken Ratner Collection- Exhibition Dates: September 26, 2014 – January 11, 2015
- Touching on Water: Paintings by Thomas Paquette - Exhibition Dates: January 23, 2015 – March 29, 2015.
- Between the States: Photographs of the American Civil War from the George Eastman House Collection. Exhibition Dates: April 10 – August 2, 2015.
- The Colorado River: Flowing Through Conflict, Photographs by Pete McBride. Exhibition Dates: August 14, 2015 - February 7, 2016.
- Richard Parrish: Aerial Perspectives of the American Landscape. Exhibition Dates: February 12 – June 19, 2016.
- Art of the Parks: Celebrating 100 Years of the National Park Service. Exhibition Dates: February 19 – December 31, 2016.
- Historic Photographs of Watkins Glen State Park. Exhibition Dates: February 23 – December 31, 2016.
- American Masterworks of Howard Terpning: Highlights from the Eddie Basha Collection. Exhibition Dates: June 24 – September 11, 2016.
- 40 for 40: Anniversary Highlights from the Permanent Collection, Curated by Celebrity Guest Artists Steven & William Ladd. Exhibition Dates: September 24, 2016 – January 15, 2017.
- Modernist Masters, Contemporary Icons: Highlights from the Old Jail Art Center. Exhibition Dates: February 3, 2017 – April 23, 2017.
- Marie Watt: The Western Door. Exhibition Dates: May 5, 2017 – September 5, 2017.
- The Harmon and Harriet Kelley Collection of African-American Art: Works on Paper. Exhibition Dates: September 15, 2017 – December 31, 2017.

Previous exhibits include a collection from National Geographic displaying the work of Ansel Adams and William Henry Jackson, and an Andy Warhol: Cowboys and Indians exhibit.

There are also some well-known pottery artists such as Tammy Garcia, Joseph Lonewolf, Nancy Youngblood, Margaret Tafoya, Maria Martinez, Al Qoyawayma and Popovi Da whose works are on display.
