= Houghton family =

Prominent New England and Upstate New York business family

The Houghton family is a prominent New England and Upstate New York business family. The Corning Glass Works was founded and run by some members of the family.

== Family members and descendants ==
The family includes

- Amory Houghton Sr. (1812–1882), founder of Corning Glass Works (1851), married Sophronia Mann Oakes (1814–1880)
  - Amory Houghton Jr. (1837–1909), president of Corning Glass Works, married Ellen Ann Bigelow (1840–1918)
    - Arthur A. Houghton Sr. (1866–1928), president of Corning Glass, married Mahitbel Hollister (1867–1938)
      - Arthur A. Houghton Jr. (1906–1990), philanthropist, president of Steuben Glass Co., a division of Corning Glass; co-founded the Corning Museum of Glass
    - Alanson Bigelow Houghton (1863–1941), president of Corning Glass, U.S. Representative from New York (1919–1922), U.S. Ambassador to Germany (1922–1925), and U.S. Ambassador to Britain (1925–1929), married Adelaide Wellington (1867–1945)
      - Amory Houghton (1899–1981), Corning Glass president and chairman; and Ambassador to France (1957–1961); co-founded the Corning Museum of Glass
        - Amo Houghton (1926–2020), CEO of Corning Glass and U.S. Representative from New York (1987–2005)
        - James R. Houghton (1936–2022), chairman of Corning Inc.
    - Clara Mabel Houghton (1870-1958), married William J. Tully (1870–1930), New York State Senator 1905 to 1908
      - Alice Tully (1902–1993), philanthropist and founding benefactor of Alice Tully Hall
      - Marion Tully Dimick (1904–1981), philanthropist and patron of the arts
  - Alfred Augustus Houghton (1851−1892), married Caroline Garlinghouse (1856-1894)
    - Katharine Martha Houghton Hepburn (1878–1951), suffragist and birth control advocate
      - Katharine Houghton Hepburn (1907–2003), four-time Academy Award-winning actress, and named the greatest female star of classic Hollywood cinema by the American Film Institute
      - Marion Grant (1918−1986), historian, writer, activist
        - Katharine Houghton (b. 1945), actress
    - Edith Houghton Hooker (1879–1948), suffragist
    - Marion Houghton Mason (1882–1968), suffragist

Other members more distantly related

- Schuyler Grant (b. 1970), actress, Anne of Green Gables
- Mundy Hepburn (b. 1955), sculptor
- Margaret Perry (1920–2006), librarian

== See also ==
- Wealthiest Americans (1957)
- List of U.S. political families
- President and Fellows of Harvard College (2006)
- Corning Incorporated
  - Steuben Glass Works
