= Connecticut Society of Social Hygiene =

The Connecticut Society of Social Hygiene was founded in 1911 to "limit the spread of social disease". Through public education efforts, legislative reform, and other methods, the Society attempted to use eugenics to raise public awareness and influence public policy. Losing influence during World War I, in 1920 they reincorporated as the Connecticut Social Hygiene Association, Inc., a branch of the American Social Hygiene Association.

Thomas N. Hepburn, father of actress Katharine Hepburn, was among the prominent Connecticut residents to co-found the society. Along with his wife, Katharine Martha Houghton Hepburn, and other members, they advocated for age-appropriate sex education and worked to slow the spread of sexually transmitted infections (STIs) or sexually transmitted disease (STD).

== Founding ==
The Society resulted from a petition signed by 110 Hartford, Connecticut residents in 1910. The petition read in part "We, the undersigned, realizing the serious menace to humanity – moral, physical, and financial, – of the diseases which have their origin in the social evil, agree to organize ourselves into a body for the purpose of studying the means, – moral sanitary, and administrative, - which may seem to us best suited to limit the spread of these diseases."
