= Marion Grant =

American historian, writer and activist (1918–1986)

- Born: Marion Houghton Hepburn; April 24, 1918; Hartford, Connecticut, U.S.
- Died: August 1, 1986 (aged 68); Old Saybrook, Connecticut, U.S.
- Burial place: Cedar Hill Cemetery
- Education: Bennington College
- Occupations: Historian; writer; activist
- Spouse: Ellsworth S. Grant (m. 1939)
- Children: 3, including Katharine Houghton
- Mother: Katharine Martha Houghton Hepburn
- Relatives: Houghton family

Marion Houghton Grant (née Hepburn; April 24, 1918 – August 1, 1986) was an American historian, writer and activist. She was the daughter of feminist Katharine Martha Houghton Hepburn and the sister of actress Katharine Hepburn. Her daughter Katharine Houghton and granddaughter Schuyler Grant are actresses.

== Early life ==
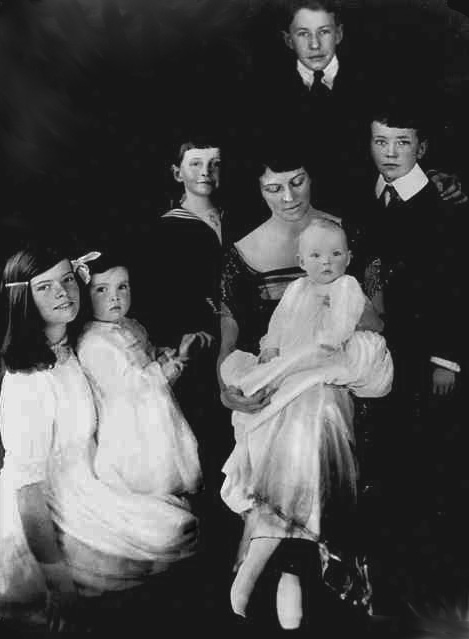
Hepburn (second from left) in a family portrait in 1921

Marion Houghton Hepburn was born on April 24, 1918, in Hartford, Connecticut, as the second daughter and fifth child of the six children of Katharine Martha Houghton and Thomas Naval Hepburn. She had three older brothers, Thomas Houghton, Richard Houghton, and Robert Houghton Hepburn, and two sisters, Katharine Houghton and Margaret Houghton Hepburn. Her sister, Katharine, was a four time Oscar-winning movie star, and her cousin, Alice Tully, was a philanthropist.

Hepburn was raised in Hartford, where she attended Oxford School. She attended summer school in Fenwick. She loved to travel abroad and spent two summers at a South Carolina plantation owned by novelist Julia Peterkin. At Bennington College she majored in creative writing and studied labor, government and sociology.

== Personal life ==
Hepburn was passionate about social issues, promoting justice and democracy, but considered the main purpose of her life getting married. She met Ellsworth Strong Grant, a historian and future mayor of West Hartford, at a dance party. They were engaged at Hepburn's parents' home on February 2, 1939, and married a week after graduation. The couple spent their time engaged in community activity, writing, and studying history. They had two sons, John, a writer, and Toby Grant, a student, and a daughter, Katharine Houghton, an actress.

After Marion's death in 1986, Grant remarried to Virginia Tuttle, remaining with her until her death in 2012. Grant died in 2013 at the age of 95. Her son, Toby, died in 2010.

== Career ==
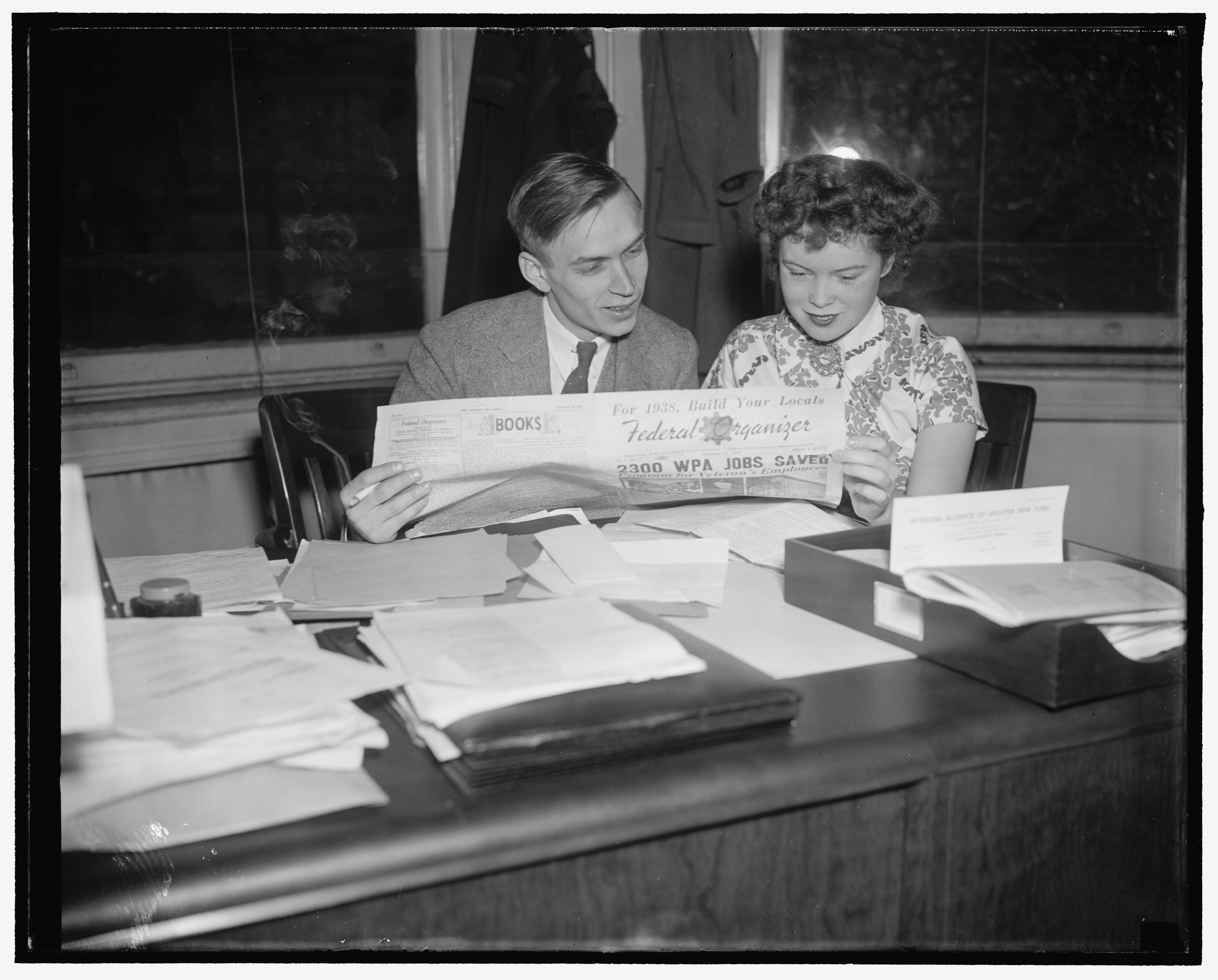
Hepburn with Arthur Goldschmidt in 1938

Hepburn started her career at the age of 17 working at the Hull House Chicago. Two years later she was working for the United Federal Workers of America. She was the co-founder of the Urban League of Hartford and served as President of the Junior League as well as President of the Women's Association of her church. She wrote three books about the history of Hartford, Saybrook, and Fenwick. In 1971, Hepburn published a book about the influential inhabitants of Fenwick to mark the 100th anniversary of the founding of the borough.

== Death ==
Hepburn died in her sleep at her seaside summer residence in Old Saybrook, Connecticut, on August 1, 1986, due to a heart attack at the age of 68. She was buried at Cedar Hill Cemetery in Hartford.
