= Thomas S. Buechner =

American artist and museum director (1926–2010)

Thomas Scharman Buechner (pronounced BEAK-ner; September 25, 1926 – June 13, 2010) was an artist who turned to working at museums. After working for New York's Metropolitan Museum of Art, he became the founding director of the Corning Museum of Glass, and later director of the Brooklyn Museum, where he oversaw a major transformation in its operation and displays, before returning to Corning.

== Early life and education ==
Buechner was born in Manhattan on September 25, 1926. He was raised in Bronxville, New York and attended the Lawrenceville School in Lawrence Township, Mercer County, New Jersey. After completing high school, he was assigned to attend a training program at Princeton University as part of his service in the United States Navy. After completing his military service he spent a year working for the Puerto Rico tourism board so that he could learn the Spanish language. He came back to New York City, working as a night elevator operator at the Plaza Hotel while he studied at the Art Students League of New York. He studied at the École des Beaux-Arts in Paris and under M.M. van Dantzig in Amsterdam.

== Professional career ==
After studying painting in Europe, Buechner returned to the United States and took a position as an assistant manager at the Metropolitan Museum of Art as a way to have a career in art without being an artist.

In 1951, aged 25, he was named as the founding director of the Corning Museum of Glass in Corning, New York which he created as a place where historic and modern glass works were displayed. Many of the exhibits he developed went on tour to other museums around the country. He also established the peer-reviewed Journal of Glass Studies, which covers the history of glassmaking to the mid-20th century, and New Glass Review, "an annual survey of glass in contemporary art, architecture, craft, and design".

He was named as director of the Brooklyn Museum in 1960, making him, at 33, one of the youngest directors of a prominent museum in the country. There he oversaw a program in which the museum's storage and display standards were upgraded, and many of the thousand works that had been languishing in storage were placed on view to the public. A sculpture garden he created displayed such items as capitals from Louis Sullivan's Bayard-Condict Building. He rescued sculptures by Daniel Chester French representing Brooklyn and Manhattan which had sat at the Brooklyn plaza of the Manhattan Bridge and that were removed as part of construction on the bridge's approaches, and placed them at the entrance to the museum. Buechner requested that the city give the sculptures to the museum after they were threatened with destruction as part of a project to connect the bridge to expressways on either side of the East River.

He was hired by Corning Glass in 1971, where he served as president of the firm's Steuben Glass division from 1973 to 1982, and headed the Glass Museum there from 1973 to 1980.

== Later life and legacy ==
He retired from Corning in 1987 and devoted his time to painting, including a portrait of Alice Tully that is on display in the foyer of Lincoln Center's Alice Tully Hall. Lincoln Center had commissioned Buechner to paint the full-length portrait in honor of Tully's 85th birthday.

Buechner died of lymphoma at age 83 on June 13, 2010, in his home in Corning, New York. He was survived by his wife, the former Mary Hawkins, as well as by a daughter, two sons and seven grandchildren.

Buechner was second cousin of the writer William Zinsser.
