= Marion Tully Dimick =

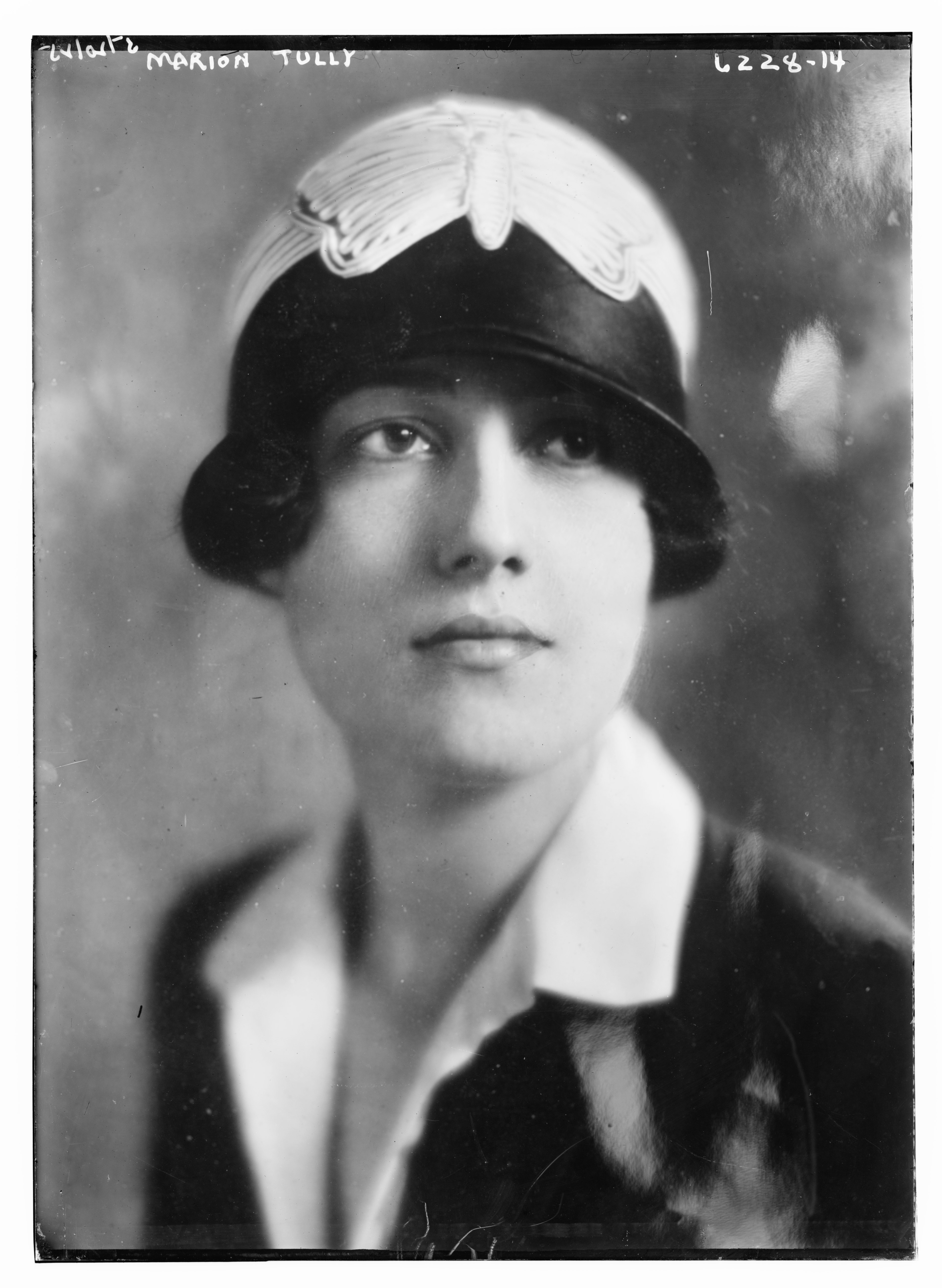
- Marion Tully, later Dimick, from the Bain News Service, Library of Congress
- Born: Marion Gordon Tully; May 4, 1904; Corning, New York
- Died: June 2, 1981 (aged 77); Washington, D.C.
- Other names: Marion T. Hoover, Teena Dimick
- Occupation(s): Philanthropist, arts patron
- Parent: William J. Tully
- Relatives: Alice Tully (sister), Alanson B. Houghton (uncle), Amory Houghton (cousin), Arthur A. Houghton Jr. (cousin

Marion Tully Dimick (May 4, 1904 – June 2, 1981), sometimes known as Teena Dimick, was an American philanthropist and arts patron, based in Washington, D.C. She funded archaeological work in Egypt, Central America, and the United States.

== Early life ==
Marion Tully was born in Corning, New York, the younger daughter of William J. Tully and Clara Mabel Houghton Tully. Her father was a lawyer and a New York state senator. Her uncle was ambassador Alanson B. Houghton, and her first cousins included ambassador Amory Houghton and industrialist Arthur A. Houghton Jr. Her older sister was opera singer and philanthropist Alice Tully. Their great-grandfather founded Corning Glass. She graduated from the Westover School in Connecticut in 1921, studied for two years in Paris after school, and was presented at Buckingham Palace in 1925.

== Career ==
Dimick volunteered with the American Red Cross during World War II. She was vice-president on the board of the National Symphony, and held board appointments at the Potomac School, the Washington Opera Society, National Savings and Trust Company, and the Washington Home for Incurables.

In the 1950s, with her second husband, Dimick traveled to archaeological sites in Egypt and Guatemala; the dig at Mit Rahina in Egypt was funded in part by her "substantial" donations to the University Museum of the University of Pennsylvania. She published a short book about Egypt, Memphis: The City of the White Wall (1956). She also donated funds to the University of Michigan, for archaeological work in the Great Lakes region.

== Personal life ==
Marion Tully married twice. Her first husband was Reeve Hoover. They married in 1926 and had four children; they divorced in March 1951. Her second husband was petroleum engineer and archaeologist John M. Dimick; they married in June 1951. Marion Tully Dimick died in Washington in 1981, aged 77 years.
