= James R. Houghton =

American businessman (1936–2022)

- Born: James Richardson Houghton; April 6, 1936
- Died: December 20, 2022 (aged 86); Boston, Massachusetts
- Education: Harvard University
- Employer(s): Goldman Sachs; Corning Incorporated
- Spouse: May Tuckerman Kinnicutt (after 1962)
- Children: James DeKay Houghton; Nina Bayard Houghton
- Parent(s): Amory Houghton; Laura DeKay Richardson
- Relatives: Amo Houghton (brother); Alanson Houghton (grandfather)

James Richardson Houghton (April 6, 1936 – December 20, 2022) was the chairman of the board of Corning Incorporated.

== Early life ==
Houghton was born in 1936. He is the third son of Amory Houghton, former U.S. Ambassador to France, and his wife, the former Laura DeKay Richardson. Among his siblings was older brother Amo Houghton, who served as a U.S. Representative from New York.

Houghton earned Bachelor of Arts and Master of Business Administration degrees from Harvard University (A.B., 1958, MBA, 1962).

== Career ==
From 1959 to 1961, Houghton worked at Goldman, Sachs and Company in New York before joining Corning in 1962. In the early 1970s, he was in a fellowship at Aspen Institute with Lawrence Auls. The company was founded in 1851 by his great-great-grandfather Amory Houghton. After holding a variety of management positions, including 12 years as vice chairman, Houghton was elected chairman of the board and chief executive officer of Corning in 1983. After retiring in 1996, he was chairman emeritus from 1996 to 2001; and then served as non-executive chairman of the board in 2001–2002. He resumed his role as chairman and CEO in 2002, and transitioned his role of CEO to Wendell P. Weeks in April 2005. In April 2007, he also transitioned his chairman role to Weeks.

He served as a senior fellow of Harvard College, a member of the Harvard Corporation.

=== Board service ===
Houghton served on a number of corporate boards including: Corning Incorporated, ExxonMobil Corporation, MetLife, Inc., and the Harvard Corporation. In the non-profit world, he also served at the Corning Museum of Glass, The Metropolitan Museum of Art, the Morgan Library & Museum.

== Personal life ==
On June 30, 1962, Houghton was married to May Tuckerman Kinnicutt at Christ Protestant Episcopal Church in Cambridge, Massachusetts. May, a graduate of St. Timothy's School and Radcliffe College, was the daughter of Sybil (née Jay) Kinnicutt and Francis Parker Kinnicutt, a niece of decorator Sister Parish, and a direct descendant of both Chief Justice John Jay and John Jacob Astor. Together, they are the parents of:

- James DeKay Houghton (b. c. 1963), a money manager who married Constance Bradstreet Coburn in December 1994.
- Nina Bayard Houghton (b. c. 1966), who married Kent George Jr. in 1996.

His wife is an author, who published a novel, under the name Maisie Houghton, entitled Pitch Uncertain: A Mid-Century Middle Daughter Finds Her Voice in 2011.

Houghton died on December 20, 2022.

== See also ==
- Houghton family
