= Schuyler Grant =

Former American actress

- Education: Columbia University
- Occupation: Actress
- Years active: 1985–2000
- Known for: Anne of Green Gables; Anne of Green Gables: The Sequel; Anne of Green Gables: The Continuing Story
- Spouse: Jeff Krasno (m. 1995)
- Relatives: Katharine Hepburn (great-aunt); Katharine Houghton (aunt)
- Family: See Houghton family
- Website: schuylergrant.com

Schuyler Grant is an American former actress best known for playing Diana Barry in Anne of Green Gables (1985) and for other supporting roles in television.

== Education and personal life ==
Grant is a graduate of Sebastopol, California's Analy High School, class of 1988, and of Columbia University, where she met her husband, Jeff Krasno, in 1993. They married in 1995 and have three children: Phoebe, Lolli, and Micah Krasno.

== Family ==
Grant is the daughter of Jack Grant and Ann Grant. She has one brother, Jason Grant.

Her paternal grandmother was Connecticut historian Marion Hepburn, sister of actress Katharine Hepburn and daughter of suffragist Katharine Martha Houghton Hepburn, who, with Margaret Sanger, played a prominent role in the American Birth Control League that would evolve into Planned Parenthood. Her paternal grandfather was Ellsworth Strong Grant, a historian and former mayor of West Hartford, Connecticut, who was a direct descendant of Puritan minister Thomas Hooker.

Notable relatives in the acting world include her aunt Katharine Houghton and her great-aunt Katharine Hepburn.

== Anne of Green Gables fame ==
Grant is best known for her work in the Canadian Anne of Green Gables mini-series, in which she played Diana Barry opposite Megan Follows as Anne Shirley. Grant reprised her role in the sequel Anne of Avonlea (1987), in which Diana married Fred Wright and had a child, as well as the trilogy's finale, Anne of Green Gables: The Continuing Story (2000).

== Additional roles ==
At age 17, Grant co-starred with her great-aunt Katharine Hepburn in Laura Lansing Slept Here (1988), and she later played the role of Camille Hawkins on All My Children. This character had a brief romance with another All My Children character, Tad Martin.

== Filmography ==
Year	Title	Role	Notes
1985	Anne of Green Gables	Diana Barry	TV movie
1987	Anne of Avonlea	Diana Barry	TV movie
1988	Laura Lansing Slept Here	Annette Gomphers	TV movie
1991	Law & Order	Callie	Episode: "Aria"
1998	Wrestling with Alligators	Delores	
1998	All My Children	Camille Hawkins / Joy Hawkins	3 episodes
2000	Anne of Green Gables: The Continuing Story	Diana Barry Wright	TV movie

== See also ==
- Houghton family
