= Arthur A. Houghton Jr. =

American industrialist (1906–1990)

10th President of the Metropolitan Museum of Art
- In office 1964–1970
- Preceded by: Roland L. Redmond
- Succeeded by: C. Douglas Dillon

Personal details
- Born: Arthur Amory Houghton Jr. December 12, 1906 Corning, New York, U.S.
- Died: April 3, 1990 (aged 83) Venice, Florida, U.S.
- Spouses: Jane Olmsted (m. 1929; div. 1938); Ellen Crenshaw (m. 1939; div. 1944); Elizabeth Douglas McCall (m. 1944; div. 1972); Nina Rodale (m. 1973)
- Children: 4
- Relatives: Houghton family
- Education: St. Paul's School
- Alma mater: Harvard University

Arthur Amory Houghton Jr. (December 12, 1906 – April 3, 1990) was an American industrialist who served as the president of Steuben Glass Works, the Metropolitan Museum of Art and the New York Philharmonic.

== Early life ==
Houghton was born in Corning, New York, on December 12, 1906. He was the son of Mahitbel "Mabel" (née Hollister) Houghton (1867–1938) and Arthur Amory Houghton Sr. (1866–1928), a former president of Corning Glass. His parents lived in Corning and in New York City at 920 and 941 Park Avenue. He had two older sisters, Phoebe Hollister Houghton, who died young, and Gratia Buell Houghton, who married writer and playwright Alan Rinehart.

His paternal grandparents were Amory Houghton Jr., a former president of Corning, and Ellen Ann (née Bigelow) Houghton. Arthur was nephew of Alanson Bigelow Houghton (a U.S. Representative and Ambassador to England and Germany) and a great-grandson of Amory Houghton Sr., a founder of Corning Glass Works in 1851. Among the many prominent family members of his generation were the U.S. Ambassador to France, Amory Houghton, and Alice Tully, who donated the funds for a chamber music hall at Lincoln Center named in her honor (Alice Tully Hall built in 1963).

Like his father before him, Houghton attended St. Paul's School in Concord, New Hampshire in 1925, and graduated from Harvard University in 1929.

== Career ==
After his graduation from Harvard, Houghton joined the family business. In 1933, he began his forty-year service as president of Steuben Glass Works, a subsidiary of the Corning Company, where he is credited for a change of artistic direction toward more modern forms, which incorporated Art Deco and modernist themes. He hired renowned sculptors including Sidney Waugh, Massimo Vignelli.

In 1940, while remaining in his role as president of Steuben but relinquishing day-to-day operations, he began to serve as the curator of rare books at the Library of Congress, in Washington, D.C., under Archibald MacLeish, the Librarian of Congress. Houghton served in this role for two years until the outbreak of World War II, where he served as an officer in the Army Air Corps for three years, retiring in 1945 as a Lieutenant colonel. He also served as a director of the USX Corporation (formerly U.S. Steel) and the New York Life Insurance Company as well as an honorary trustee of The United States Trust Company.

In 1951, along with his cousin Amory Houghton, he co-founded the Corning Museum of Glass.

=== Philanthropy ===
In 1942, he endowed Houghton Library at Harvard as a repository for the university's collections of rare books and manuscripts, and, later, donated Wye River, his plantation on the Eastern Shore of Maryland where he bred Black Angus cattle, to the Aspen Institute, the international public policy organization, which is today the Aspen Institute Wye River Conference Centers.

In 1952, he joined the board of the New York Philharmonic, serving as chairman from 1958 to 1963 and on the board itself until 1965. While he was on the board, and during his presidency, the Philharmonic moved from Carnegie Hall to the Lincoln Center for the Performing Arts, while he served, as vice-chairman, alongside John D. Rockefeller III, as chairman, of a committee to create Lincoln Center. He was also a vice president of the Pierpont Morgan Library, a president of the English-Speaking Union of the U.S., a trustee and chairman of the Cooper Union, a trustee and chairman of the Parsons School of Design, and chairman of the Institute of International Education.

In 1960, Mr. Houghton gifted 273 acres of land on Spencer Hill in Corning, New York for the development of Corning Community College. Warner, Burns, Toan & Lunde Architects of New York City were selected as campus architects. When the College’s permanent library was completed on the Spencer Hill campus in May 1964, it was appropriately dedicated to Arthur A. Houghton, Jr.

In September 1964, Houghton was elected to replace Roland L. Redmond as the 10th president of the Metropolitan Museum of Art in New York City, and became chairman in 1969 (and serving until 1972). Houghton, who was a member of more than 100 education and arts organizations, served on the board of the Museum from 1952 to 1974. He was succeeded as president by C. Douglas Dillon, a former investment banker who had worked with the Eisenhower, Kennedy and Johnson Administrations.

== Personal life ==
On June 12, 1929, Houghton married Jane Olmsted (1909–1982) at St. Stephen's Episcopal Church in Harrisburg. Jane was the daughter of Gertrude (née Howard) McCormick and Marlin Edgar Olmsted, a Republican member of the U.S. Congress from Pennsylvania. Before their divorce in July 1938, they were the parents of:

- Jane Olmsted Houghton (1930–1989), who married Rollin Van Nostrand Hadley Jr. in 1950. She later married Robert Gordon Hankey, Horace E. Henderson, and George R. Kneeland.
- Sylvia Houghton (b. 1933), who married Richard Gordon Garrett in 1963.

His first wife remarried to Hugh McMillan in 1947. On June 7, 1939, he was married for the second time to Ellen Crenshaw (1906–1961) in Queenstown, Maryland. Ellen was a friend of Washington journalist Joseph Alsop. Before their divorce in January 1944, they were the parents of one child:

- Arthur Amory Houghton III (b. 1940), who married Sherrill Jean Mulliken in 1968. He later married Linda Livingston Davis, daughter of Goodhue Livingston Jr., in 1987. Arthur was the assistant curator in antiquities at the J. Paul Getty Museum.

On January 15, 1944, he married for the third time to Elizabeth Douglas McCall (1919–1996), a daughter of Arthur May McCall. They lived at 3 Sutton Place, a four-story brick townhouse that was built in 1921 for Anne Morgan, daughter of financier J.P. Morgan. In 1971, Mr. Houghton Jr donated it to the United Nations for use as the official residence of the Secretary-General in 1972) and before their divorce in 1972, were the parents of one child:

- Hollister Douglas "Holly" Houghton (b. 1945), who married equestrian William D. Haggard III in 1968.

After their divorce, Elizabeth remarried to prominent architect Walker O. Cain in 1973. On May 22, 1973, he married for the fourth, and final time, to Nina (née Rodale) Horstmann (b. 1937) at Annapolis. Nina, the daughter of J. I. Rodale of Rodale, Inc. and sister of Robert Rodale, was previously married to Robert Horstmann. In 1979, the philanthropic couple donated the Wye Plantation, their previous compound, to the Aspen Institute.

Houghton, who also had a home in Boca Grande, died at Venice Hospital in Venice, Florida, on April 3, 1990. He was buried at the Old Wye Episcopal Church Cemetery in Wye Mills, Maryland. Nina went on to live at their compound in Queenstown, Maryland until her death on March 15, 2020.

In 1949, Houghton was awarded permanent, honorary membership at The Guild of Carillonneurs in North America. The organization sought to recognize him for funding the Houghton Memorial Carillon, a 23-bell carillon located at St. Paul's School in Concord, New Hampshire, in 1933.

In 1971, he was awarded the Skowhegan Gertrude Vanderbilt Whitney Award by the Skowhegan School of Painting and Sculpture for his outstanding efforts as "a patron of the arts."

Cultural offices
Preceded by Roland L. Redmond	President of the Metropolitan Museum of Art; 1964–1970	Succeeded by C. Douglas Dillon
