= Frederick Carder =

English artist and glassmaker (1863–1963)

- Frederick Carder, 1902
- Born: September 18, 1863; Wordsley, Staffordshire, England
- Died: December 10, 1963 (aged 100); Corning, New York, U.S.
- Occupations: Glass maker and glass designer
- Spouse: Annie Walker (m. 1887; died 1943)
- Children: 3
- Awards: Honorary doctorate from Alfred University (1960)

Frederick Carder (September 18, 1863 – December 10, 1963) was an English-born American glassmaker and designer known for his work in decorative glass. He began his career as a designer at Stevens & Williams, an English glass manufacturer, before co-founding Steuben Glass Works in Corning, New York, in 1903.

As Steuben’s managing director from 1903 to 1932, Carder developed more than 8,000 glass designs in a variety of styles. He was known for his experimentation with glass colors and forms, particularly the development of iridescent Aurene glass. His work is represented in numerous museum collections, including the Corning Museum of Glass, which holds an extensive collection of his glass designs.

== Early life and education ==
Frederick Carder was born on September 18, 1863, in Wordsley, Staffordshire, England, to Caleb and Ann Carder. His grandfather owned the Leys pottery in nearby Brierley Hill, which manufactured stone-glazed pottery. As a child, Carder developed an interest in glassmaking and spent much of his spare time sketching, modeling, and working with clay at his grandfather’s factory.

Carder left school at age 14 to work in his family's pottery business, where he learned about ceramic glazes and chemistry. He continued his education through evening classes at the Stourbridge School of Art and the Dudley Mechanics Institute. He later studied under John Northwood, a glass artist known for his cameo glass designs, who trained him in glass and marble carving.

== Career ==
=== Stevens & Williams (1881–1903) ===
At age 17, Frederick Carder began working at Stevens and Williams as a glass designer, where he learned glassmaking and engraving. Although the company primarily produced clear cut crystal, Carder persuaded the factory supervisor to manufacture some of his colored glass designs, which proved commercially successful. The following year, Northwood joined Stevens & Williams, where he and Carder worked together on several colored glass designs. Their professional relationship later deteriorated. While at Stevens & Williams, Carder worked with Peter Fabergé of Russia.

In addition to his work at Stevens & Williams, Carder taught glass design at the Stourbridge School of Art. In 1891, he helped establish the Wordsley School of Art, which provided advanced training for glassmakers. He traveled to Europe in 1902 and the United States in 1903 to study glassmaking techniques. During his visit to the U.S., he met Thomas G. Hawkes, who operated a glass engraving company in Corning, New York.

=== Steuben Glass Works (1903–1932) ===
Steuben Glass Works, 1908

In 1903, Carder partnered with Hawkes to establish Steuben Glass Works in Corning. Although the terms of their partnership are unknown, Hawkes is believed to have financed the venture, while Carder oversaw the company’s design, production, and daily operations. Carder recruited 15 glassmakers from England, but they were denied entry to the United States and detained in Montreal. Unable to bring over the English workers, he turned to American glass manufacturers to recruit experienced Swedish glassmakers, including Henning Overstrom, Steuben’s first glassblower.

Under Carder’s direction, the company began producing cut glass while Carder experimented with colored glass designs. In 1904, he patented Aurene, a gold-toned iridescent glass similar to Louis Comfort Tiffany’s Favrile glass. Carder directed the company’s design and production, developed glass formulas, and established sales policies. By 1932, he had introduced more than 8,000 glass designs in a variety of colours and styles.

During World War I, restrictions on raw materials threatened Steuben Glass Works with closure. In 1918, the company was sold to Corning Glass Works, becoming its Steuben Division. Carder remained managing director, although production shifted away from decorative glass toward industrial products, including light bulbs, tubing, and optical glass.

Following the Wall Street crash of 1929 and the onset of the Great Depression, declining sales led to changes at Steuben. Carder was instructed to introduce more modern glass designs. In February 1932, he was replaced as managing director by John MacKay and appointed art director of Corning Glass Works.

=== Later career at Corning Glass Works (1932–1959) ===
In 1932, Steuben Glass Works was reorganized under the leadership of Arthur A. Houghton Jr.. Carder continued working at Corning Glass Works as art director, overseeing the design and development of glass products. Although his involvement in production gradually diminished, he maintained an office and glass studio and continued to advise Corning’s scientists and management. Carder was awarded the Binns Medal in 1934, which recognized his professional accomplishments in ceramics and glass design.

In 1959, Carder retired from Corning Glass Works. He moved most of his glass collection to his home and donated the remaining contents of his office to the Corning Museum of Glass.

== Personal life ==
Frederick Carder married Annie Walker on May 21, 1887, in Dudley, Worcestershire. They had three children: Gladys, Stanley, and Cyril. Annie died in May 1943. Carder died in December 1963, at the age of 100.

== Legacy ==
Frederick Carder Elementary School in Corning was named in his honor in 1954. In 1960, Alfred University honored Carder with an honorary doctorate degree.

In May 2001, the Corning Museum of Glass opened the Frederick Carder Gallery, displaying more than 2,000 examples of his glass designs spanning seven decades. The gallery closed in October 2026.
