= The Gardener (1974 film) =

- Directed by: James H. Kay
- Written by: James H. Kay
- Produced by: Tony Belletier
- Starring: Joe Dallesandro; Katharine Houghton; Rita Gam
- Cinematography: Michael Zingale
- Edited by: Cal Schultz
- Music by: Marc Fredericks
- Production company: KKI Films Inc.
- Distributed by: Nolan Production
- Release date: October 1974
- Running time: 86 minutes
- Country: United States
- Language: English
- Budget: $800,000 (estimated)

The Gardener (also known as Garden of Death and Seeds of Evil) is a 1974 American horror film written and directed by James H. Kay and starring Joe Dallesandro and Katharine Houghton.

== Plot ==
Carl the Gardner (Joe Dallesandro) grows odd plants for a rich Yankee woman Ellen Bennett (Katharine Houghton) living in South America while exercising a mental hold over her. All his previous employers died mysteriously.

== Cast ==
- Joe Dallesandro as Carl, The Gardener
- Katharine Houghton as Ellen Bennett
- Rita Gam as Helena Boardman
- James Congdon as John Bennett
- Anne Meacham as Mrs. García
- Teodorina Bello as Liza, The Maid
- Ivan Rodriguez as Max
- Esther Mari as Rosa
- Irma Torres as Domenica

== Release ==
=== Home media ===
The film was released on DVD by Subversive on February 28, 2006. It was later released by Subversive Cinema on January 29, 2008 as a part of its two-disk "Greenhouse Gore Two-Fer".

== Reception ==
TV Guide gave the film a negative review, calling it "rotten". Reviewing Subversive's DVD release of the film, Johnny Butane from Dread Central awarded the film a score of 3.5 out of 5. While noting that the film was "dull and unexciting", Butane stated that the DVD's extras made it worth buying. Brett Gallman from Oh, the Horror! panned the film, criticizing the lack of atmosphere, threadbare plot, sluggish pacing, and dull photography.

Glenn Erickson from DVD Talk criticized the film's lack of scares or tension, and script, calling it "yet another ill-fated attempt to try something different in a horror movie".

== Other ==
According to director James H. Kay, on the evening when the scene in which Warhol superstar Joe Dallesandro's character swims nude in the pool was filmed half of San Juan showed up to watch the shoot.

== See also ==
- List of American films of 1974
