= Edith Houghton Hooker =

American journalist (1879–1948)

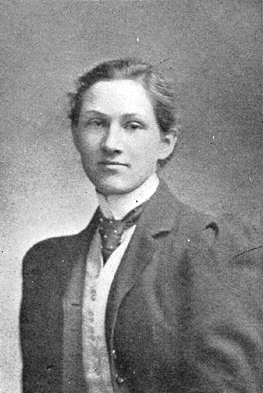
- At Bryn Mawr College in 1901
- Born: Edith Houghton; December 29, 1879; Buffalo, New York, US
- Died: October 23, 1948 (aged 68)
- Education: Bryn Mawr College; Johns Hopkins School of Medicine
- Occupations: Suffragist; Social worker
- Spouse: Donald Hooker (m. 1905)
- Children: 5 (+ 3 adopted)
- Relatives: See Houghton family
- Awards: Maryland Women's Hall of Fame

Edith Houghton Hooker (December 29, 1879 – October 23, 1948) was an American suffragist and social worker. She was a leader of the suffrage movement in Maryland in the early twentieth century and was posthumously inducted into the Maryland Women's Hall of Fame. She was a maternal aunt of actress Katharine Hepburn.

== Early years and education ==
Edith Houghton was born in 1879 in Buffalo, New York. A member of the Houghton family, her parents were Caroline Garlinghouse and Alfred Augustus Houghton, and her sister Katharine, was a prominent feminist. Alfred A. Houghton, Edith's father, died in 1892 of suicide. Her mother, Caroline, supported the advancement of education for women. Before Caroline's death in 1894 from stomach cancer, she provided instructions regarding the education of her daughters.

Close relatives preferred the girls attend a traditional finishing school. After a family conflict Edith and Katharine were permitted to engage in higher education and both applied to Bryn Mawr College. She attended Bryn Mawr College, graduating in 1901, before moving to Baltimore to enroll at the Johns Hopkins School of Medicine as one of the medical school's first female students.

While at Johns Hopkins, she met Donald Hooker, a professor, and married him in June 1905, and had 5 children, and adopted 3 more.

== Career ==
Hooker spent a year studying in Berlin before returning to Baltimore to commence a career in social work. Her studies in Berlin included casework related to prostitution issues in the military. During the first half of the 20th century social issues involving public health, such as prostitution, could contribute to prejudice towards unwed mothers. Discrimination could restrict housing options, limit the potential of marriage and financial stability. Through her research Hooker learned that prostitution had been connected to some types of illness, disease and death which she wrote about in an article written for the Journal of Social Hygiene in 1919.

Hooker's work in Berlin led to her determination that men and women should be held equally responsible in the societal issue of prostitution. In the context of public health, she further developed her views of equality and women's rights in one of her key publications, The Laws of Sex .

Edith and Donald Hooker established the Guild of St. George of Baltimore, which provided housing and services for unwed mothers and their children. Hooker was president of the Guild of St. George from 1906 to 1911. Through her work at the Guild she promoted awareness of public health issues and the rights of women. During the years 1918-1920 Hooker continued her research and wrote several journal articles on her findings. She considered sex education for both men and women an important strategy to decrease the societal costs of disease. Within the medical community there was continued research on germ theory, as well as recognition of the effect of germs on disease, and attempts were being made to isolate related bacteria.

Hooker and other suffragists working in the public health field knew that strategically there would be a struggle because of the entrenched double standard that permeated society. This kind of research further propelled Hooker in her decision to bring even greater awareness and support for sex education. Similar public health and societal issues worldwide led Hooker and other suffragists to study the benefits of women's right to vote.

== Suffrage activism ==
Hooker determined that the most efficient way to achieve reform was to campaign for the right of women to vote by joining the suffrage movement in Baltimore. She joined the Equal Suffrage League of Baltimore in 1907 but resigned in 1909 to found the Just Government League, an affiliate of the National American Woman Suffrage Association.

In 1910, she began educating the public about suffrage through open air meetings at locations across Maryland. As a speaker Hooker was deft with persuasive use of language and practical evidence gathered from her research. In order to promote support she noted that women's suffrage would reduce disease, improve water quality, and make women better wives. This was a tactic used by Hooker and other suffragists who supported combining Social Hygiene Movement and the women's suffrage movement to improve society. Additionally, Hooker would appeal to men by noting that women active in politics, which could arise only if given the right to vote, would encourage them to discuss politics with their husbands and thereby promote better marriages.

In 1912, Hooker established the Maryland Suffrage News, a weekly newspaper and the official organ of the Just Government League, and in 1917, she was invited to become the editor of The Suffragist, the weekly newspaper of the National Woman's Party.

The Maryland Suffrage News ceased publication in 1920 when the Nineteenth Amendment to the United States Constitution was ratified. Hooker was also active in the Congressional Union, and was elected finance chairman of the organization's executive committee in 1915. After suffrage was granted to American women, her efforts focused on introducing a bill that would ensure women equal political and civil rights. Although the bill was passed by the Maryland House of Delegates, it was rejected by the Maryland Senate; a subsequent revision, which was revised to include only a section stating that women would be allowed to hold office, was passed by both houses in 1922.

== Later years ==
Hooker died in 1948 after a seven-year illness. She was inducted into the Maryland Women's Hall of Fame in 1999.

== Publications ==
- Houghton Hooker, Edith (1921). The Laws of Sex. Boston: R.G. Badger. ISBN 9781290921848
- Houghton Hooker, Edith (1918). Life's Clinic: A Series of Sketches Written From Between the Lines of Some Medical Case Histories. New York: Association Press. ISBN 978-1342525123

== See also ==
- List of suffragists and suffragettes
- Women's rights
- Women's suffrage
- Katharine Martha Houghton Hepburn
- Houghton family
- Katharine Hepburn
- Quaker views on women
- Social Hygiene Movement
- Frances Harper
- Madeleine Lemoyne Ellicott
