= Roland L. Redmond =

American lawyer and museum administrator

9th President of the Metropolitan Museum of Art
- In office 1947–1964
- Preceded by: William Church Osborn
- Succeeded by: Arthur Amory Houghton Jr.

Personal details
- Born: Roland Livingston Redmond; September 13, 1892 Tivoli, New York, U.S.
- Died: April 20, 1982 (aged 89) Tivoli, New York, U.S.
- Spouse(s): Sara Delano (m. 1915; div. 1953) Lydia Bodrero (m. 1957)
- Parent(s): Geraldyn Redmond; Estelle Livingston Redmond
- Relatives: Goold H. Redmond (uncle)
- Education: Harvard University; Columbia Law School

Roland Livingston Redmond (September 13, 1892 – April 20, 1982) was an American lawyer who served as the president of the Metropolitan Museum of Art.

== Early life ==
Redmond was born on September 13, 1892, at his parents stately two-story 18th-century mansion, known as Callendar House, Tivoli, New York, which was inherited by his mother and redesigned by McKim, Mead & White in 1910. (Note: Callendar House was later purchased by Count Jean de Castella, a Swiss investment banker, in 1978. It was later purchased by Pierre Moulin.) He was the second son of Geraldyn Redmond (1854–1918) and Estelle Maud (née Livingston) Redmond (1860–1916). His brothers were Johnston Livingston Redmond and Geraldyn Livingston Redmond. In New York, the Redmonds lived at 701 Fifth Avenue, next door to their aunt at 705 Fifth Avenue, in what was disguised by McKim, Mead & White as a single French limestone mansion. (Note: The Redmond's Fifth Avenue mansion was sold in 1927 for $1.265 million, but not torn down until the early 1930s, when it was replaced by the new Union Club, which was designed and completed in 1933 by Delano & Aldrich.) His parents, who were prominent in Catholic circles, donated the funds to the Fathers of Mercy, a French community of priests, to build Church of Notre-Dame on 114th Street in Manhattan.

His paternal grandparents were Sabina Elizabeth (née Hoyt) Redmond and William Redmond, a prominent merchant with Wm. Redmond & Son, who was born in Ballymena, County Antrim in Northern Ireland, and was one of the founders of the Union Club. His paternal uncle was the bachelor Goold H. Redmond, and through his paternal aunt, Matilda Redmond Cross, the wife of banker Richard James Cross, he was a first cousin of John Walter Cross and Eliot Cross, prominent architects with the firm of Cross & Cross. His maternal grandparents were Johnston Livingston and Sylvia Mathilde (née Livingston) Livingston. Through his maternal grandmother, a granddaughter of U.S. Representative Henry W. Livingston, he was also a descendant of the Schuyler family. (Note: Sylvia Mathilde (née Livingston) Livingston (1827–1873) was a daughter of Henry Walter Livingston (1798–1848), who married Caroline de Grasse De Pau (1806–1871), daughter of Francis De Pau, a French shipping magnate and slave owner, and Silvie de Grasse, daughter of a French count, in 1823) In 1902, his mother and aunt, Countess Carola de Laugier-Villars, built St. Sylvia Church in Tivoli, in memory of Redmond's maternal grandmother.

Redmond attended Harvard University and after graduation in 1915 (cum laude), attended Columbia Law School where he obtained his Juris Doctor in 1917.

== Career ==
From May 12, 1917, to March 2, 1919, he served in the U.S. Army, obtaining the rank of 1st Lieutenant, Field Artillery. Redmond was a member of the Plattsburg Movement and attended Officers Training Camp. After sailing to France, he was detailed to the Artillery School at Fontainebleau and Gondrecourt. Beginning in 1918, he took part in the Battle of Château-Thierry, was transferred to the 306th Field Artillery and fought in the Oise-Aisne and the Meuse-Argonne Offensives. After his return from War, he was admitted to the bar in 1919.

In 1929, Redmond joined the prestigious New York law firm of Carter, Ledyard & Milburn and was with the firm, as counsel, until his death in 1982. (Note: Some sources claim he was a partner at Carter, Ledyard & Milburn from 1919 to 1955.) For a time, he was Vincent Astor's personal attorney.

He also served on the board of many institutions, including the Pierpont Morgan Library, the New York Public Library, the American Geographic Society and the United States Trust Company of New York.

=== Metropolitan Museum of Art ===
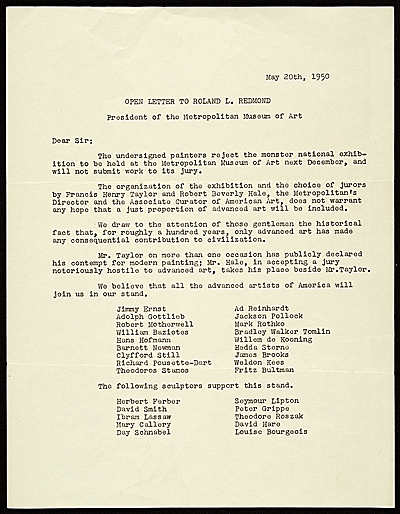
Open letter to Roland L. Redmond, May 20, 1950, from the Hedda Sterne papers.

From 1947 to 1964, Redmond served as president of the Metropolitan Museum of Art and was a "trustee, elective and emeritus, for 48 years, a record for a Met trustee." While president, two directors worked underneath him, Francis Henry Taylor and James Rorimer, and a massive expansion program that took place between 1951 and 1954, and involved nearly the entire reconstruction of the existing building and modernization of the Grace Rainey Rogers Auditorium.

The most popular exhibition while he was president was in 1963 when the Mona Lisa was on display for one-month. His tenure was also marked by several attacks from artists who felt the museum was opposed to contemporary art, which "Redmond did not take pains to conceal his own lack of sympathy with a good deal of modern art." In 1950, in response to a juried exhibition, entitled American Painting Today - 1950, eighteen well-known American painters later, including Clyfford Still, Robert Motherwell, Willem de Kooning, Mark Rothko and Jackson Pollock, collectively known as The Irascibles, sent an open letter to Redmond stating they would not participate because the juries were "notoriously hostile to advanced art."

== Personal life ==
On June 5, 1915, Redmond was married to Sara Delano (1894–1984) at St. Sylvia's Memorial Church with a reception held at the Delano country estate, Steen Valetje. Sara was the youngest daughter of coal tycoon Warren Delano and Jennie (née Walters) Delano. Her mother was the daughter of William Thompson Walters, a merchant and art collector, and the niece of Henry Walters, who formed the Walters Art Museum. Through her namesake aunt Sara Delano Roosevelt, Sara was a first cousin of President Franklin D. Roosevelt. They had a home in New York City, at 760 Fifth Avenue (and later at 350 Fifth Avenue), and a residence in Syosset on Long Island known as White Elephant Farm. Before their divorce in 1953, they were the parents of four daughters:

- Sylvie Livingston Redmond, a writer who married William Griffiths Jr. in December 1940.
- Sheila Delano Redmond (d. 2000), who married Malcolm D. Perkins in 1944.
- Joan Walters Redmond (1919–1995), who married Curtis Seaman Read.
- Cynthia Redmond, who married Maj. Peter Somes Hopkins in 1946. She later married Donald E. Mead.

In 1916, upon the death of his mother, he inherited $75,000 (equivalent to $2,219,037 today) outright and an interest in the trust set up for the remainder of her estate, valued between $3,000,000 and $4,000,000. 1925, he inherited his aunt's home at Tivoli-on-the-Hudson upon her death, along with a legacy in excess of $200,000 (equivalent to $3,671,727 today).

After he left his wife in the fall of 1952, he took up with Lydia (née Bodrero), Princess di San Faustino, and they married in Palm Beach on December 2, 1957. Lydia, the daughter of Commendatore Gen. Alessandro Bodrero, was the mother of two children, Edith Carpenter Macy (b. 1927) (the wife of Friedrich Karl von Schönborn-Buchheim), from her first marriage to Valentine E. Macy Jr., and Montino Bourbon del Monte, Prince di San Faustino (b. 1942), from her second marriage to Ranieri Bourbon del Monte, Prince di San Faustino. Ranieri was a son of Carlo Bourbon del Monte, Prince di San Faustino and brother to Virginia Bourbon del Monte, wife of industrialist Edoardo Agnelli.

Redmond died on April 20, 1982, at his home in Tivoli.

=== Honors and legacy ===
Redmond was awarded the Legion of Honor from France as well as decorations from the Netherlands (as Commander of the Order of Orange-Nassau) and Denmark.

Cultural offices
Preceded by William Church Osborn	President of the Metropolitan Museum of Art; 1947–1964	Succeeded by Arthur Amory Houghton Jr.
