= Katharine Houghton =

American actress and playwright

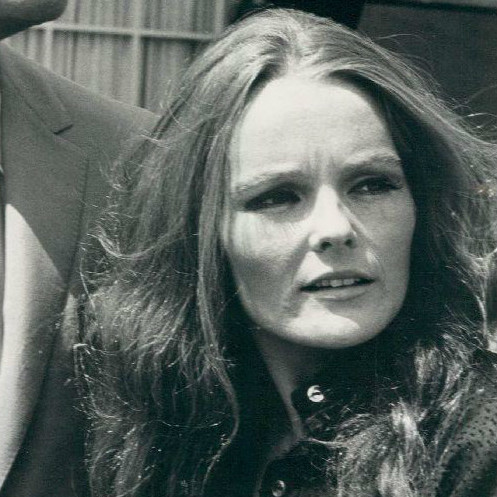
- Houghton as a guest star on Judd, for the Defense (1968)
- Born: Katharine Houghton Grant; Hartford, Connecticut, U.S.
- Education: Sarah Lawrence College
- Occupations: Actress; playwright
- Years active: 1965–present
- Known for: Guess Who's Coming to Dinner (1967); The Last Airbender (2010)
- Spouse: Ken Jenkins (m. 1970)
- Mother: Marion Grant
- Relatives: Katharine Martha Houghton Hepburn (grandmother); Katharine Hepburn (aunt); Schuyler Grant (niece)
- Family: Houghton

Katharine Houghton (born Katharine Houghton Grant, March 10, 1945) is an American actress and playwright. She portrayed Joanna "Joey" Drayton, a white woman who brings home her black fiancé to meet her parents, in the 1967 film Guess Who's Coming to Dinner. Katharine Hepburn, who played the mother of Houghton's character in the film, was Houghton's aunt. Houghton was nominated for a Golden Globe Award for her performance. She is also known for her role as Kanna, the grandmother of Katara and Sokka in the film The Last Airbender (2010).

== Early and personal life ==
Houghton was born in Hartford, Connecticut, the second child of Marion Hepburn and Ellsworth Grant. Houghton was named after her maternal grandmother, Connecticut suffragist and reformer Katharine Martha Houghton Hepburn.

Houghton attended Kingswood-Oxford School and Sarah Lawrence College, where she majored in philosophy. Partially influenced by her aunt, actress Katharine Hepburn, she pursued acting as a way to help alleviate her osteoarthritis.

Houghton has been married to fellow actor Ken Jenkins since 1970.

== Career ==
=== Acting ===
"Working with my aunt on that film was difficult and complex. It was an exceedingly hard time for her. Spencer was dying, and she was like a tinderbox. It was a fascinating experience for me but not easy. Spencer was darling, supportive, and protective. He had flaws, but he was wonderful to me. So was Sidney, who was kind, sweet, and available. He was like a big brother."

— Houghton reflecting on her experience filming Guess Who's Coming to Dinner

During her college junior year, Houghton began appearing in summer stock theater. In 1965, she made her Broadway debut in A Very Rich Woman and appeared in minor television roles.

Houghton made her film debut in Guess Who's Coming to Dinner (1967) as the daughter Joanna Drayton opposite Sidney Poitier. She auditioned for the role and believed that her aunt, who was also appearing in the film, was influential in her casting. During filming, the film's director Stanley Kramer decided her character was appearing too articulate and intelligent. He decided instead to have her character portrayed as an ordinary and sweet girl. Arthur D. Murphy, the chief film critic for Variety, praised Houghton's performance, writing she is "an attractive, talented girl who is off to a running start." Because of the interracial kiss depicted in the film, Houghton and Kramer received hate mail and death threats.

Following Guess Who's Coming to Dinner (1967), Houghton became typecast as the woman in interracial relationships. However, Houghton decided to leave behind her Hollywood career due to lackluster scripts. "I turned down these projects and returned to the theater," she explained. "It was fate. I went on to play Hedda and Nora and Nina and Kate." Since then, she has appeared in leading roles in over 60 productions on Broadway, Off-Broadway and in regional theatres throughout the United States. In 1970, she won the Theatre World Award for her performance in the Off-Broadway play A Scent of Flowers (written by James Saunders). She returned to film acting in the 1988 comedy-drama Mr. North.

Houghton has presented lectures at venues across the country including the 2001 Fall Concert & Lectures Series at the Metropolitan Museum of Art and at The Cosmopolitan Club in New York. She lectured at the Metropolitan Museum of Art again in June 2008, presenting "Saucy Gamine, Reluctant Penitent, and Glorious Victor", a review of her aunt's career in Hollywood as reflected in three of her films.

=== Writing ===
Houghton has also worked as a playwright, and by 1990, she had written nine Off-Broadway and regional productions. In 1975, Houghton wrote a children's story, "The Wizard's Daughter", which is collected in the book Two Beastly Tales, illustrated by Joan Patchen. The second story in the book is written by John Grant, Houghton's elder brother. During the early 1980s, she wrote and starred in a one-woman show To Heaven in a Swing, detailing Louisa May Alcott's life with her Transcendentalist father, Amos Bronson Alcott.

She also co-wrote a one-act play titled Buddha, exploring a psychological power struggle between a man and a woman. The play was subsequently published in The Best Short Plays of 1988–1989. Her musical Bookends premiered at the New Jersey Repertory Company on July 19, 2007. It is loosely inspired by rare book dealers Leona Rostenberg and Madeleine Stern, whom Houghton had met while researching Alcott. The musical's lyrics were composed by Dianne Adams and James McDowell. It received rave notices, and garnered the theater the highest box office sales in their 11-year history. Since then, it has twice been part of The York Theatre's Developmental Reading Series.

== Filmography ==
=== Film ===
Year	Title	Role
1967	Guess Who's Coming to Dinner	Joanna 'Joey' Drayton
1974	The Gardener	Ellen Bennett
1982	The Eyes of the Amaryllis	
1988	Mr. North	Mrs. Skeel
1991	Billy Bathgate	Charlotte
1993	Ethan Frome	Mrs. Hale
1993	The Night We Never Met	Less / More Cheese Lady
1995	Let It Be Me	Homeless Woman
2004	Kinsey	Mrs. Spaulding
2010	The Last Airbender	Kanna, Katara and Sokka's Grandmother

=== Television ===
Year	Title	Role	Notes
1966	ABC Stage 67	Bonnie	"The Confession"
1966	Hawk	Ophelia	"How Close Can You Get?"
1968	Judd, for the Defense	Suzy Thurston	"In a Puff of Smoke"
1974	CBS Daytime 90	Gabby	"Legacy of Fear"
1976	The Adams Chronicles	Abigail Adams Smith	TV miniseries
1981	ABC Afterschool Special	Miss James	"The Color of Friendship"
1987	I'll Take Manhattan	Pepper Delafield	TV miniseries
1992	All My Children	Flora Gresham	15 episodes
2017	Mr. Mercedes	Elizabeth Wharton	"Cloudy, with a Chance of Mayhem", "The Suicide Hour"

== See also ==
- Houghton family
