= Dwight Lanmon =

American art historian and museum director

- Born: Dwight Pierson Lanmon; July 28, 1938 (age 87)
- Education: University of Delaware (MA); University of Colorado (BS)
- Occupations: Art historian, museum director
- Employer(s): Corning Museum of Glass, Winterthur Museum

Dwight Pierson Lanmon (born July 28, 1938) is an American art historian and retired curator and museum director. An expert in ceramics and glass, he served as director of the Corning Museum of Glass (1981–1992) and the Winterthur Museum, Garden and Library (1992–1999). Lanmon holds a BA degree in physics from the University of Colorado and an MA from the Winterthur Program in Early American Culture, jointly administered by Winterthur Museum and the University of Delaware.

== Early life and education ==
Lanmon grew up in Denver, Colorado, and received a bachelor's degree in physics from the University of Colorado. He worked as an aerospace engineer at Northrop and TRW Inc and took night classes in art history, American history, and decorative arts at University of California, Los Angeles. In 1966, he received a fellowship to attend the Winterthur Program in Early American Culture, from which he received his master's degree in 1968. While at Winterthur, Lanmon met fellow graduate student, Ann Lorraine Welling, whom he married in 1970.

== Career and retirement ==
Lanmon started his career in the arts as assistant curator (later promoted to associate curator) for ceramics and glass at the Winterthur Museum. In 1973, the Corning Museum of Glass in New York recruited him to serve as chief curator and curator of pre-1900 European glass. He became deputy director of collections in 1976 and director in 1981. He also served as a trustee of the Rockwell Museum from 1983 to 1992, serving as board president from 1988 to 1992 and acting director from 1986 to 1988.

Lanmon returned to Winterthur Museum as director in 1992 and served until his retirement in 1999. During his tenure at Winterthur, he revitalized the museum's expansive gardens and made the collections more intellectually accessible. His tenure saw the opening of a new building, which permitted visitors to explore the museum's collections via rotating exhibitions. Before 1992, visitors had to make appointments to access the museum, which required guided tours and prohibited entrance to children under 12.

In 1999, Lanmon retired to the Southwestern United States, living in Santa Fe, New Mexico, and Phoenix, Arizona, where he published four books on Pueblo pottery and served as a research associate at both the Indian Arts Research Center of the School for Advanced Research and the Museum of Indian Arts and Culture in Santa Fe.In 2011, he published a comprehensive book on the history of glassmaking in England during the period 1650-1775:The Golden Age of English Glass, 1650-1775.
