= Frank C. Platt =

American politician

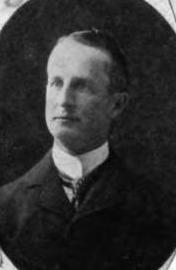
Frank C. Platt (1903)

Francis Cephas Platt (born January 23, 1866, in Painted Post, Steuben County, New York – died May 31, 1952) was an American politician from New York.

== Life ==
He was the son of Cephas F. Platt (died 1883) and Mary E. Platt. He attended the public schools, and then became a farmer. On January 7, 1895, he married Jennie Faulkner, and they had two sons. He was Supervisor of the Town of Erwin from 1896 to 1899.

Platt was a Republican member of the New York State Assembly (Steuben Co., 1st D.) in 1900, 1901, 1902, 1903, 1904 and 1905.

He was a member of the New York State Senate (43rd D.) from 1909 to 1912, sitting in the 132nd, 133rd, 134th and 135th New York State Legislatures.

In 1922, Platt ran for the Republican nomination for Congress, proposing to hold a popular referendum on the question of prohibition of alcohol. and in 1930, Platt ran for the Republican nomination for sheriff of Steuben County. In 1936, Platt made another bid for a seat in the state assembly.

Platt married Jane Faulkner, with whom he had two sons, Gerald and Chester.

== Sources ==
- Official New York from Cleveland to Hughes by Charles Elliott Fitch (Hurd Publishing Co., New York and Buffalo, 1911, Vol. IV; pg. 343f, 346, 348f, 351 and 367)
- The New York Red Book by Edgar L. Murlin (1903; pg. 169f)

New York State Assembly
Preceded by Edward D. Cross	New York State Assembly; Steuben County, 1st District; 1900–1905	Succeeded by William H. Chamberlain
New York State Senate
Preceded by William J. Tully	New York State Senate; 43rd District; 1909–1912	Succeeded by John Seeley
