= William J. Tully =

American politician (1870–1930)

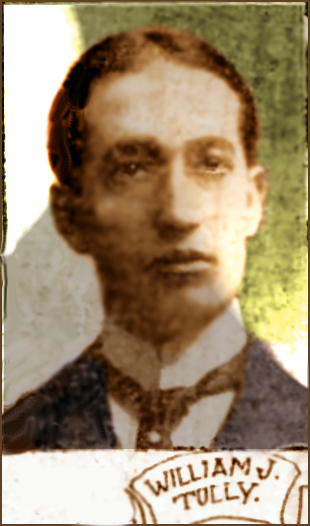

Member of the New York Senate from the 41st district
- In office 1905–1906
- Preceded by: Franklin D. Sherwood
- Succeeded by: Benjamin M. Wilcox

Member of the New York Senate from the 43rd district
- In office 1907–1908
- Preceded by: Merton E. Lewis
- Succeeded by: Frank C. Platt

Personal details
- Born: William John Tully; October 1, 1870 Corning, New York
- Died: August 22, 1930 (aged 59) Little Neck, New York
- Cause of death: Heart attack
- Resting place: Locust Valley Cemetery, Locust Valley, New York, U.S.
- Spouse: Clara M. Houghton
- Children: Three daughters
- Education: LL.B., New York Law School
- Alma mater: Brooklyn Polytechnic Institute and Columbia College
- Profession: Attorney, politician

William John Tully (October 1, 1870 in Corning, Steuben County, New York – August 22, 1930) was an American lawyer and politician from New York.

== Life ==
He was the son of Joseph J. Tully and Sarah (Byers) Tully. He attended Corning Free Academy, Brooklyn Polytechnic Institute and Columbia College. He graduated LL.B. from New York Law School, was admitted to the bar, and practiced in Corning. On October 5, 1898, he married Clara Mabel Houghton (1870–1958), and they had three daughters, among them philanthropists Alice Tully (1902–1993) and Marion Tully Dimick (1904–1981).

Tully was a member of the New York State Senate from 1905 to 1908, sitting in the 128th, 129th (both 41st D.), 130th and 131st New York State Legislatures (both 43rd D.). Afterwards he was General Counsel of the Metropolitan Life Insurance Company in New York City. He was also active in the Episcopal Church, serving as president of the Deputies of the Synod in New York and New Jersey.

He died on August 22, 1930, while riding in an automobile from his home in Locust Valley, Nassau County, New York, to New York City; and was buried at the Locust Valley Cemetery.

== See also ==
- Houghton family

== Sources ==
- Official New York from Cleveland to Hughes by Charles Elliott Fitch (Hurd Publishing Co., New York and Buffalo, 1911, Vol. IV; pg. 365f)
- WILLIAM J. TULLY DIES RIDING TO CITY in NYT on August 23, 1930 (subscription required)

New York State Senate
Preceded by Franklin D. Sherwood	New York State Senate; 41st District; 1905–1906	Succeeded by Benjamin M. Wilcox
Preceded by Merton E. Lewis	New York State Senate; 43rd District; 1907–1908	Succeeded by Frank C. Platt
