= William Zinsser =

American writer (1922–2015)

- Born: William Knowlton Zinsser; October 7, 1922; New York City, U.S.
- Died: May 12, 2015 (aged 92); New York City, U.S.
- Education: Princeton University
- Occupations: Writer; editor; teacher
- Known for: On Writing Well
- Spouse: Carolyn Fraser (m. 1954)
- Children: 2

William Knowlton Zinsser (October 7, 1922 – May 12, 2015) was an American writer, editor and teacher. He began his career working as a feature writer for the New York Herald Tribune. He then became a free-lance contributor to magazines, and authored numerous books; his best known was On Writing Well, a style guide for non-fiction writers that sold an estimated 1.5 million copies. Over the years he taught writing at several universities including Yale, The New School, and Columbia.

== Early life and family ==
William Zinsser was born in 1922 into an affluent New York City family. He was raised on the North Shore of Long Island. As a child he was interested in music; he studied piano and later worked part-time as a pianist. His parents regularly brought him sheet music from Broadway shows. He recalled how he memorized many of the popular songs of the 1920s and '30s, and developed an early appreciation of clever, concise phrasing: "The words appealed to me as much as the music; I already knew I wanted to grow up to be a newspaperman." He attended Buckley Country Day School and Deerfield Academy. After graduating from Princeton University, he enlisted in the U.S. Army in World War II and served in North Africa and Italy.

He married Carolyn Fraser, with whom he had two children, including John Zinsser, a painter of abstract art. The Zinssers owned homes in New York City and Niantic, Connecticut. Zinsser had several famous people in his wider family network. One of his cousins married Konrad Adenauer, first chancellor of West Germany; another relative was the spouse of John J. McCloy. Zinsser noted, "So it happened that the two men who collaborated most closely on the creation of the new Germany were Zinsser relatives." He was also a second cousin of the painter Thomas S. Buechner.

== Career ==
After leaving the Army, Zinsser was hired in 1946 by the New York Herald Tribune, and remained with the newspaper until 1959. During his time there he held a series of positions: feature writer, drama editor, chief movie critic, and editorial writer. He then started a career as a free-lance writer, contributing to magazines such as The Atlantic, The New Yorker, and The Saturday Evening Post. He also began authoring non-fiction books about varied subjects including travel, movies, and humorous observations on living in New York City. In 1968 he became a columnist for Life magazine. Two years later he joined the Yale University faculty, where he initiated a "Nonfiction Workshop" course, the first of its kind at the university. He also edited the Yale Alumni Magazine. In 1973 he was named master of Yale's Branford College. From 1979 to 1987, Zinsser was Executive Editor of the Book-of-the-Month Club. Starting in 1988 he taught writing at The New School, and was also an instructor at the Columbia University Graduate School of Journalism.

After nearly two decades as a relatively unknown author of non-fiction books, Zinsser achieved mainstream success in 1976 with his guide, On Writing Well, which he derived from his writing course at Yale. The book received laudatory reviews in the nation's newspapers, and went through seven printings in the first two years. A second edition came out in 1980 and more editions followed over the next 25 years. The book eventually sold more than a million copies and has been compared with The Elements of Style by William Strunk Jr. and E. B. White as an essential guide for writers. In his 2004 autobiography, Zinsser acknowledged that he did not find his own authorial voice and style until he wrote On Writing Well when he was in his fifties:

Until then my style more probably reflected who I wanted to be perceived as – the urbane essayist or columnist or humorist – than who I really was. Only when I began to write as a teacher and had no agenda except to be helpful – to pass along what I knew – did my style become integrated with my personality and my character. Now, whatever I write about, I make myself available. No hiding.

The success of On Writing Well led to Zinsser offering two follow-up books: Writing with a Word Processor (1983) and Writing to Learn (1988).

In the 1980s, Zinsser began compiling and editing a series of anthologies, published by Houghton Mifflin, on "the Art and Craft" of different book genres, among them biography, memoir, religious writing, political fiction, and children's and travel writing. In subsequent years he wrote about his boyhood passions: Spring Training (1989) is a journalistic account of the Pittsburgh Pirates preseason training camp, while also conveying his lifelong love of baseball; Easy to Remember (2000) is a tribute to 20th century American composers and lyricists, and the hundreds of songs they contributed to Broadway and Hollywood musicals.

In his writing about writing, Zinsser emphasized the importance of brevity, for instance:

Clutter is the disease of American writing. We are a society strangling in unnecessary words, circular constructions, pompous frills and meaningless jargon.

Author James J. Kilpatrick stated in his guide, The Writer's Art, that if he were limited to just one book on how to write, it would be Zinsser's On Writing Well. He quoted from the book that "Writing improves in direct ratio to the number of things we can keep out of it".

In the late 2000s, Zinsser began posting a weekly online column for the The American Scholar website. His musings ranged over a variety of topics including travel, the craft of memoir writing, the arts, and popular culture. The postings, known as "Zinsser on Friday", won the 2012 National Magazine Award in the Digital Commentary category and were collected in the anthology, The Writer Who Stayed (2012). At age 90, when asked to define success, Zinsser said it was "doing what you want to do and doing it well".

== Media appearances ==
Zinsser interviewed Woody Allen in 1963 for The Saturday Evening Post. After a chance encounter in 1980, Allen cast Zinsser, a Protestant, in a small uncredited role as an unsympathetic Catholic priest in the film Stardust Memories.

== Death ==
In his last years, Zinsser lost his eyesight due to glaucoma. He continued to teach by having writing students gather at his Upper East Side Manhattan apartment and read their work to him.

On May 12, 2015, William Zinsser died at his home. He was 92.

== Selected bibliography ==
- Any Old Place with You. New York: Simon and Schuster. 1957. LCCN 57005677. Illustrations by Robert Day.
- Seen Any Good Movies Lately?. Garden City: Doubleday. 1958. LCCN 58013266. Illustrations by Robert Day. Introduction by Elia Kazan.
- Search & Research: The Collections and Uses of the New York Public Library at Fifth Avenue and 42nd Street. New York: The Library. 1961. LCCN 61014647. Illustrations by Tom Funk.
- The City Dwellers. New York: Harper & Row. 1962. LCCN 62014551. Illustrations by Milton Glaser.
- Weekend guests, from "We're so glad you could come" to "We're so sorry you have to go," and vice-versa. New York: Harper & Row. 1963. LCCN 63016522. Illustrations by James Stevenson.
- The Haircurl Papers and Other Searches for the Lost Individual. New York: Harper & Row. 1964. LCCN 64012684.
- Pop Goes America. New York: Harper & Row. 1966. LCCN 66021714.
- The Paradise Bit. Boston: Little, Brown. 1967. LCCN 67014457. Zinsser's only published novel.
- Annual Report of the National Refractory & Brake Company. New York: Harper & Row. 1969. LCCN 72088641. Illustrations by James Stevenson.
- The Lunacy Boom. New York: Harper & Row. 1970. LCCN 74127220.
- On Writing Well: An Informal Guide to Writing Nonfiction (1st ed.). New York: Harper & Row. 1976. ISBN 978-0060147983.
- Writing with a Word Processor. New York: Harper & Row. 1983. ISBN 978-0060150556.
- Willie and Dwike: An American Profile. New York: Harper & Row. 1984. ISBN 978-0060152758. A biography of jazz musicians Willie Ruff and Dwike Mitchell, later retitled Mitchell & Ruff.
- Extraordinary Lives: The Art and Craft of American Biography. Boston: Houghton Mifflin. 1986. ISBN 978-0828112192. Edited by Zinsser.
- A Family of Readers: An informal portrait of the Book-of-the-Month Club and its members on the occasion of its 60th anniversary. Book-of-the-Month Club. 1986. LCCN 2021769586.
- Inventing the Truth: The Art and Craft of Memoir. Boston: Houghton Mifflin. 1987. ISBN 978-0395445266. Edited by Zinsser.
- Spiritual Quests: The Art and Craft of Religious Writing. Boston: Houghton Mifflin. 1988. ISBN 978-0395486160. Edited by Zinsser.
- Writing to Learn. New York: Harper & Row. 1988. ISBN 978-0060158842.
- Paths of Resistance: The Art and Craft of the Political Novel. Boston: Houghton Mifflin. 1989. ISBN 978-0395514269. Edited by Zinsser.
- Spring Training. New York: Harper & Row. 1989. ISBN 978-0060160593.
- Worlds of Childhood: The Art and Craft of Writing for Children. Boston: Houghton Mifflin. 1990. ISBN 978-0395514252. Edited by Zinsser.
- They Went: The Art and Craft of Travel Writing. Boston: Houghton Mifflin. 1991. ISBN 978-0395563373. Edited by Zinsser.
- American Places: A Writer's Pilgrimage to 15 of this Country's Most Visited and Cherished Sites. New York: HarperCollins. 1992. ISBN 978-0060166380.
- Speaking of Journalism: Twelve Writers and Editors Talk About Their Work. New York: William Morrow. 1994. ISBN 978-0062701152. Edited by Zinsser.
- Going on Faith: Writing As a Spiritual Quest. New York: Marlowe & Co. 1999. ISBN 978-1569246863. Edited by Zinsser.
- Easy to Remember: The Great American Songwriters and Their Songs. Jaffrey, New Hampshire: David R. Godine, Publisher. 2000. ISBN 978-1567921472.
- Writing About Your Life: A Journey into the Past. New York: Marlowe & Co. 2004. ISBN 978-1569244685.
- On Writing Well: The Classic Guide to Writing Nonfiction (7th ed.). New York: HarperCollins. 2006. ISBN 978-0060891541. 30th Anniversary Edition.
- The Writer Who Stayed. Philadelphia: Paul Dry Books. 2012. ISBN 978-1589880801.
