= List of presidents of the Metropolitan Museum of Art =

There have been sixteen presidents of the Metropolitan Museum of Art. Until 1978, the position was essentially a supervisory one belonging to the head of the museum's board of trustees. In 1978, following the departure of Thomas Hoving the board decided the museum had become too complex for one person to administer, and splitting the administration between the Director, who would retain curatorial oversight, and a President, who would handle administration and finance.

No.	Image	Name	Term
1		John Taylor Johnston	1870–1889
2		Henry Gurdon Marquand	1889–1902
3		Frederic W. Rhinelander	1902–1904
4		John Pierpont Morgan	1904–1913
5		Robert Weeks de Forest	1913–1931
6		William Sloane Coffin, Sr.	1931–1933
7		George Blumenthal	1933–1941
8		William Church Osborn	1941–1947
9		Roland L. Redmond	1947–1964
10		Arthur A. Houghton Jr.	1964–1970
11		C. Douglas Dillon	1970–1977
12		William B. Macomber Jr.	1978–1986
13		William H. Luers	1986–1999
14		David E. McKinney	1999–2005
15		Emily Kernan Rafferty	2005–2015
16		Daniel Weiss	2015–2023
