= John Seeley (politician, born 1872) =

American politician

Member of the New York State Senate from the 43rd district
- In office 1913–1914

Member of the New York State Assembly from the 2nd district
- In office 1911–1912

Personal details
- Born: 1872 Woodhull, New York
- Died: 1932 (aged 59–60)
- Resting place: Addison, New York

John Seeley (1872 – 1932) was an American physician and politician from New York.

== Life ==
Seeley was a member of the New York State Assembly (Steuben Co., 2nd D.) in 1911 and 1912; and was Chairman of the Committee on the Soldiers' Home in 1911.

He was a member of the New York State Senate (43rd D.) in 1913 and 1914; and was Chairman of the Committee on Public Health.

He was buried at St. Catherine's Cemetery in Addison, New York.

== Sources ==
- Official New York from Cleveland to Hughes by Charles Elliott Fitch (Hurd Publishing Co., New York and Buffalo, 1911, Vol. IV; pg. 360)
- New York Red Book (1911, pg. 166)
- DR. JOHN SEELEY DEAD; ONCE A STATE SENATOR in NYT on November 2, 1932
- St. Catherine's Cemetery transcriptions at RootsWeb

New York State Assembly
Preceded by Charles K. Marlatt	New York State Assembly; Steuben County, 2nd District; 1911–1912	Succeeded by James L. Seely, Jr.
New York State Senate
Preceded by Frank C. Platt	New York State Senate; 43rd District; 1913–1914	Succeeded by Charles D. Newton
