= Alice Tully =

American opera singer (1902–1993)

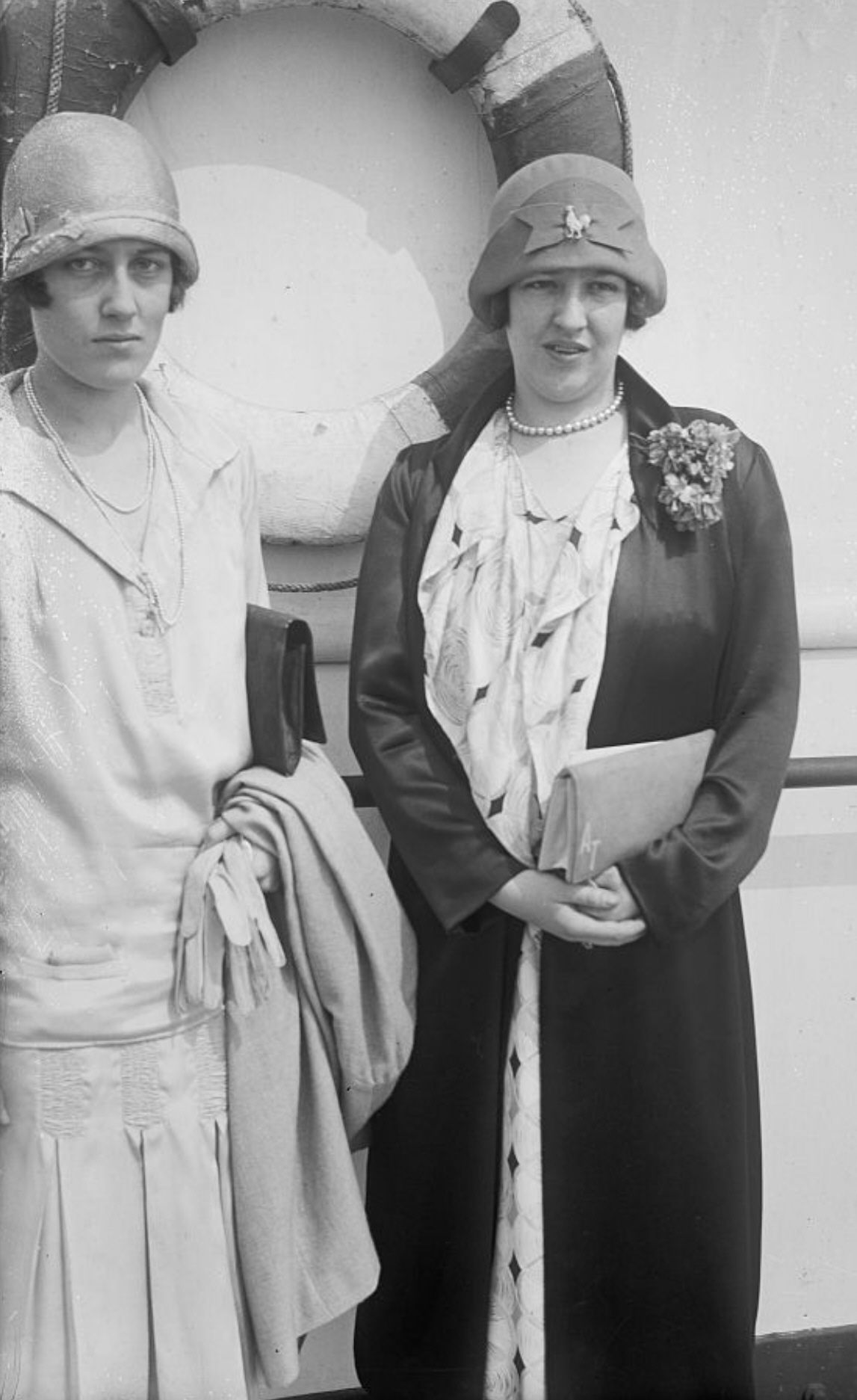
- Alice Tully (right), and her sister, Marion Tully
- Born: Alice Bigelow Tully; September 14, 1902; Corning, New York, U.S.
- Died: December 10, 1993 (aged 91); Manhattan New York City, U.S.
- Occupations: Singer, music promoter, philanthropist
- Relatives: Marion Tully Dimick (sister), Alanson Houghton (uncle), Amory Houghton (cousin), Arthur A. Houghton Jr. (cousin)
- Awards: National Medal of Arts (1985)

Alice Bigelow Tully (September 14, 1902 – December 10, 1993) was an American singer of opera and recital, music promoter, patron of the arts and philanthropist from New York. She was a second cousin of the American actress Katharine Hepburn.

== Life ==
Alice Tully was born in Corning, Steuben County, New York, the daughter of lawyer and State Senator William J. Tully (1870–1930) and Clara Mabel (Houghton) Tully (1870–1958) and had one younger sister Marion Gordon (Tully) Hoover Dimick (died Washington, 1981). She spent her high school years at the Westover School in Middlebury, Connecticut. Tully began her career as a mezzo-soprano, then became a soprano. She studied in Paris and made her debut in 1927 with the Pasdeloup Orchestra. In 1933, she appeared in Cavalleria rusticana in New York City.

Upon her mother's death in 1958, Tully inherited the estate of her grandfather, Amory Houghton Jr. (1837–1909), (son of Amory Houghton Sr., founder of the Corning Glass Works), who on June 19, 1860, married Tully's grandmother Ellen Ann Bigelow (daughter of Alanson Bigelow and his Bigelow first cousin, once removed, Anne Rebecca Bangs.) During the rest of her life, Tully donated much of her income to arts institutions, often anonymously. Her cousin, Arthur Amory Houghton Jr., one of the founders of the Lincoln Center for the Performing Arts, suggested that she give money for a chamber music hall, and in 1963 John D. Rockefeller III convinced her to allow it to be named Alice Tully Hall.

Tully chaired the board of directors of the New York Chamber Music Society, and served on the boards of the New York Philharmonic, the Metropolitan Opera and the Juilliard School.

In 1970, Tully was awarded the Handel Medallion for her contributions to the cultural life of New York City. Her most famous commission was for Olivier Messiaen who composed Des canyons aux étoiles... which had its first performance in the Alice Tully Hall in 1974. In 1985, she was awarded the National Medal of Arts.

William Schuman, Gian Carlo Menotti and Riccardo Malipiero dedicated works to her.

== Death ==
Tully never married; she had a stroke in 1991, and died in New York in 1993, aged 91.

== Sources ==
- Fuller, A., Alice Tully: An Intimate Portrait, 1999, University of Illinois Press. (Excerpts available online at Google Books.)
- "Alice Tully - philanthropist - Obituary". Dance Magazine. 68 (3). March 1994. Archived from the original on May 6, 2008 – via FindArticles.
- Lifetime Honors – National Medal of Arts
