= Amo Houghton =

American politician (1926–2020)

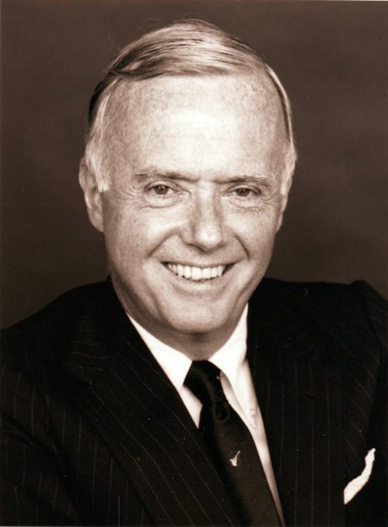

Member of the U.S. House of Representatives from New York
- In office January 3, 1987 – January 3, 2005
- Preceded by: Stan Lundine
- Succeeded by: Randy Kuhl
- Constituency: 34th district (1987–1993); 31st district (1993–2003); 29th district (2003–2005)

Personal details
- Born: Amory Houghton Jr. August 7, 1926 Corning, New York, U.S.
- Died: March 4, 2020 (aged 93) Corning, New York, U.S.
- Party: Republican
- Spouse(s): Ruth West (1950–1988); Priscilla Dewey (1989–2012)
- Children: 4
- Relatives: Amory Houghton (father); Alanson B. Houghton (grandfather)
- Education: Harvard University (BA, MBA)

Military service
- Branch/service: United States Marine Corps
- Years of service: 1944–1946
- Rank: Private first class
- Unit: USS Macon; Guantanamo Bay Naval Base
- Battles/wars: World War II • Battle of the Caribbean

Amory Houghton Jr. (August 7, 1926 – March 4, 2020) was an American Republican politician from the U.S. state of New York. He served as a member of the United States House of Representatives and was a member of one of upstate New York's most prominent business and political families, the Houghtons.

== Early life ==
The son of Amory Houghton and Laura DeKay Richardson, and the grandson of Alanson B. Houghton, Amory Houghton Jr. was born in Corning, New York. He attended St. Paul's School in Concord, New Hampshire and was a member of the class of 1945. Houghton later served as a member of the school's board of trustees.

== Military service ==
In 1944, Houghton enlisted in the United States Marine Corps for World War II. Assigned to USS Macon (CA-132) and Guantanamo Bay Naval Base, he took part with his unit in activities associated with the Battle of the Caribbean. Houghton attained the rank of private first class, and was discharged in 1946.

== Business career ==
He graduated from Harvard University with a Bachelor of Arts in 1950 and received his Master of Business Administration degree from Harvard in 1952.

Houghton spent his business career with his family's company, Corning Glass Works (now Corning Incorporated), a company founded in 1851 by his great-great-grandfather, Amory Houghton (1812-1882). He joined the company in 1951, and worked as an accountant, process engineer, manufacturing foreman, and sales manager. He joined the board of directors in 1955, became a vice president in 1957, and was appointed president in 1961. From 1964 to 1983, Houghton served as Corning's chairman and chief executive officer.

In addition to Corning Glass, his other business interests included membership on the board of directors of IBM, First National City Bank (later Citigroup), Procter & Gamble, Genentech, and B. F. Goodrich.

== U.S. Congress ==
In 1986, Houghton was elected to the United States House of Representatives as a Republican. Houghton reportedly was among the richest members of the House, with a wealth of $475 million.

=== Voting record ===
Houghton had a moderate voting record and was founder of the Republican Main Street Partnership, which he formed to encourage a more moderate stance to public issues. He was frequently called upon to serve as a broker between Democratic and Republican members on critical issues since he was a champion for improving civility between political parties. While he voted with Republicans on most issues relating to the budget, he also voted with the Democratic Party on issues of environmental protection, civil rights and funding for the arts and education.

=== Committee memberships ===
He served on the International Relations and Ways and Means Committees.

=== Issues ===
Statements by Houghton during the impeachment of Bill Clinton.

He was one of four Republicans to vote against all the impeachment articles against President Clinton in 1998.

In 2001, Houghton was one of only three Republicans to vote against permanently repealing the estate tax.

Statements by Houghton arguing against the 2003 invasion of Iraq.

On October 10, 2002, he was among the six House Republicans who voted against the resolution authorizing the invasion of Iraq.

Houghton was one of only three Republicans to vote against an initial version of the Jobs and Growth Tax Relief Reconciliation Act of 2003, the second of the two major Bush tax cuts. However, he voted for the final version of the bill.

=== Reputation ===
Throughout his career Houghton was one of Upstate New York's most well-known and respected members of Congress; he was usually re-elected with more than 65 percent of the vote. He clashed occasionally with the increasingly Southern, socially conservative orientation of the party. For example, Houghton was one of the most vocal pro-choice Republicans in Congress.

=== Later life and death ===
On April 7, 2004, Houghton announced his intention not to seek a tenth term in Congress. On January 3, 2005, Houghton's term expired and he was succeeded by John R. "Randy" Kuhl. He was a member of the ReFormers Caucus of Issue One. In 2016 and 2018, he spoke out against the presidency of Donald Trump and stated that he would support efforts to remove him from office.

Corning Inc. announced on March 5, 2020, that Houghton had died the previous day. He was 93 years old.

== Personal life ==
In 1950, Houghton married Ruth Frances West of Waccabuc, New York. Their children include Amory, Robert, Sarah, and Quincy. After their 1988 divorce, in 1989 Houghton married Priscilla B. Dewey (1924–2012).

Amo Houghton was a Christian who attended Christ Episcopal Church in Corning, New York, where he taught Sunday School throughout the 1950s. He also served as a trustee of Episcopal Theological School in Cambridge, Massachusetts, which later merged into Episcopal Divinity School.

== See also ==
- List of richest American politicians

U.S. House of Representatives
Preceded by Stan Lundine	Member of the U.S. House of Representatives from New York's 34th congressional district 1987–1993	Constituency abolished
Preceded by Bill Paxon	Member of the U.S. House of Representatives from New York's 31st congressional district 1993–2003	Constituency abolished
Preceded by John J. LaFalce	Member of the U.S. House of Representatives from New York's 29th congressional district 2003–2005	Succeeded by Randy Kuhl
