= Katharine Martha Houghton Hepburn =

American suffragist (1878–1951)

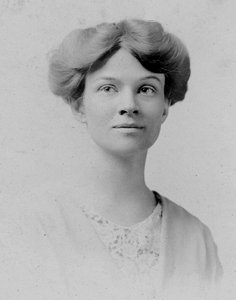
- Born: Katharine Martha Houghton; February 2, 1878; Buffalo, New York, US
- Died: March 17, 1951 (aged 73); West Hartford, Connecticut, US
- Education: Radcliffe College; Bryn Mawr College
- Occupation: Activist
- Known for: Mother and namesake of Katharine Hepburn
- Spouse: Thomas Norval Hepburn (m. 1904)
- Children: 6, including Katharine Hepburn and Marion Grant
- Relatives: See Houghton family

Katharine Martha Houghton Hepburn (February 2, 1878 – March 17, 1951) was an American feminist social reformer and a leader of the suffrage movement in the United States. Hepburn served as president of the Connecticut Woman Suffrage Association before joining the National Woman's Party. In 1923 Hepburn formed the Connecticut Branch of the American Birth Control League with two of her friends, Mrs. George Day and Mrs. M. Toscan Bennett. She was the mother and namesake of actress Katharine Hepburn and historian Marion Grant and the grandmother and namesake of actress Katharine Houghton.

== Early life ==
Katharine Martha Houghton was born on February 2, 1878, in Buffalo, New York. Her family and friends familiarly referred to her as "Kit". She was the daughter of Caroline (née Garlinghouse) and Alfred Augustus Houghton, a member of the Houghton family of Corning Incorporated glass works. She was named in part after her maternal grandmother, Martha Ann Spaulding Garlinghouse. Katharine had two younger sisters, Edith (1879–1948) and Marion (1882–1968).

When not in Buffalo, she and her family spent time at their property in the Athol Springs area of Hamburg, New York, and in Corning, New York, the seat of the family business. In contrast to the conservative views of the Episcopal Houghton family, Caroline and Alfred were progressive freethinkers. Thus, Houghton and her sisters were raised in a household that championed women's education and the ideas of the agnostic orator Robert G. Ingersoll.

In 1892, her father Alfred Houghton committed suicide, leaving Caroline to raise their three children. Not long after, Caroline was diagnosed with stomach cancer. Before her death in 1894, she inculcated her daughters, especially Katharine as the eldest, with the importance of a college education. In her will, Caroline Houghton did not name a legal guardian for her daughters, preferring that they be independent to pursue their own aspirations. After her death, the girls' education remained a point of contention between the sisters and their uncle, Amory Houghton Jr. (1837–1909), the family patriarch and president of Corning Glass. While Amory believed young women belonged in finishing school, Katharine had absorbed her mother's insistence on a college education.

Despite consistent opposition from the Houghton family, she was able to realize the promise she had made to her mother; Katharine Houghton graduated from Pennsylvania's Bryn Mawr College in 1899, with an A.B. in history and political science. She earned her master's degree in chemistry and physics the following year, although biographer Barbara Leaming claims Houghton's degree was in art history. She then briefly attended Radcliffe College. After completing preparatory studies at Baldwin School, her sisters, Edith and Marion, received degrees from Bryn Mawr in 1901 and 1906 respectively.

== Social and reform work ==
Hepburn became interested in the suffrage movement and consequently co-founded the Hartford Equal Franchise League in 1909. The following year, this organization was absorbed into the Connecticut Woman's Suffrage Association and became a branch of the National American Woman Suffrage Association.

As president of the CWSA, Hepburn represented the state of Connecticut as part of a 1913 deputation that met with President Woodrow Wilson to "seek some expression of the President of his attitude on the woman suffrage question." Earlier that year, Hepburn had played host to famed British suffragette, Emmeline Pankhurst, who was visiting Hartford on a speaking tour.

=== National Woman's Party ===
In 1917, she resigned as CWSA president, declaring the Association to be "old-fashioned and supine." She instead joined Alice Paul and the National Woman's Party, a suffrage organization with a more aggressive reputation. In an oral history interview, Paul recalled Hepburn as "the unquestioned leader of the suffragists . . . in Connecticut." She was elected to serve as legislative chairman of the organization's National Executive Committee.

After the Nineteenth Amendment was ratified in 1920, members of the Democratic Party asked Hepburn to run for the US Senate. Though Dr. Hepburn supported his wife's work, he did not wish that she campaign for office. She subsequently declined the offer.

=== Birth control advocacy ===
Having concluded her suffrage work, Hepburn allied herself with birth control advocate Margaret Sanger, a Socialist Party USA member, Industrial Workers of the World organizer. Sanger, a New York native, remembered Hepburn as "the Kathy Houghton of my Corning childhood." Together they founded the American Birth Control League. The League would eventually evolve into Planned Parenthood. Hepburn was elected chair of Sanger's National Committee on Federal Legislation for Birth Control. In her autobiography, Sanger wrote of Hepburn:

In her long public career she had learned great efficiency and […] she never let our witnesses run over their time. Just as we were swinging along briskly she invariably tugged at a coat and passed over a little slip – 'time up in one minute.'

In 1934, Hepburn, Sanger, Congressman Walter Marcus Pierce, and others met with the House Judiciary Committee in Washington, D.C. to rally on behalf of a bill which would allow doctors to disseminate contraceptive information. Among those speaking against birth control was popular Catholic radio priest Charles Coughlin. Coughlin's on-air ministry coupled with the fact that Hepburn's daughter Katharine had by that time established a film career in Hollywood, led newspapers to announce the event under the headline "Radio Father v. Movie Ma." Coughlin condemned prophylactics as communistic, and the House Committee eventually rejected the bill. Despite the defeat, TIME magazine afterward published an article noting the success of the Hepburn/Sanger birth control propaganda in yielding favorable local results for its cause.

Throughout her career, Hepburn gave numerous speeches in cities around the East Coast, including speaking engagements at Carnegie Hall. Her words were not always popular; editorials written against her in the Hartford Courant could be vitriolic enough to cause her friends to suggest she take the newspaper to court for calumny. At times, bricks or rocks were thrown through the windows of the Hepburn house. Nevertheless, Hepburn remained active in reform movements for the rest of her life, especially in the branches of women's health and birth control.

=== Political views ===
Hepburn was a socialist, and considered herself a Marxist. Talking about her parents to a Good Housekeeping reporter, Hepburn was described by her daughter as a "communist." She said to a Time Magazine journalist, "I don't think [Dad] leaned toward Communism. Mother did." Aside from her work and family, she enjoyed political debate, current events, Russian history, specifically the Bolshevik Revolution, the works of William Shakespeare and Bernard Shaw, and golf. She did not care for movies, preferring instead the theatre. Her daughter Katharine mused that it was "curious that Fate gave her a movie-queen daughter."

While one biographer of the activist's daughter claims Hepburn almost joined the Communist Party USA but did not. Yet records show that Congressional House Committees on Un-American Activities (HUAC) throughout the late 30's, 40’s and 50’s thought she had.

One early HUAC citation, from 1939, names Hepburn as one of "the overwhelming preponderance of fellow travelers" composing the CIO's National Citizens Political Action Committee, formed expressly "for the election of Franklin D Roosevelt and a Progressive Congress."

In May 1944, a HUAC reports Hepburn as one of "11 prominent American leaders" whose membership on the National Committee to Combat Anti-Semitism as suspicious. The HUAC report reads "the overwhelming preponderance of fellow travelers on the National Committee to Combat Anti-Semitism is convincing proof of Communist infiltration."

In 1948, Hepburn was identified in a HUAC report as a sponsor of the National Council of American-Soviet Friendship.

In July 1953, two years after Hepburn's death, progressive Garfield Bromley Oxnam, a bishop in the Methodist Episcopal church and IWW supporter, was called before the HUAC to explain his associations with communists, like Hepburn, and his links through her with the National Council of American-Soviet Friendship.

== Personal life ==
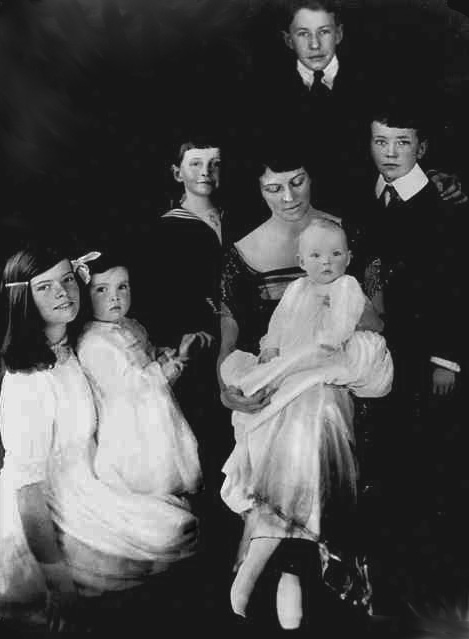
Hepburn with her six children, 1921

Around 1903, Houghton met Thomas Norval Hepburn (1879–1962), a medical student at Johns Hopkins School of Medicine in Baltimore, Maryland. Houghton spent that academic year teaching at the city's Calvert School before marrying Hepburn on June 6, 1904. Following their marriage, the Hepburns moved to Hartford, Connecticut, where Dr. Hepburn completed his internship and residency specializing in urology at Hartford Hospital. He maintained a practice at the Hospital for approximately 50 years. The family took up their primary residence in West Hartford, Connecticut, about 1928. The Hepburns also owned a home in Old Saybrook, Connecticut, where they summered. Together, Katharine and Thomas had six children over the course of 16 years, including:

- Thomas Houghton "Tom" Hepburn (1905–1921)
- Katharine Houghton Hepburn (1907–2003), four-time Academy Award-winning actress
- Richard Houghton "Dick" Hepburn (1911–2000), playwright
- Dr. Robert Houghton "Bob" Hepburn (1913–2007), urologist
- Marion Houghton Hepburn Grant (1918–1986), historian, author, Congress of Industrial Organizations (CIO) organizer, and social activist
- Margaret Houghton "Peg" Hepburn Perry (1920–2006), librarian and farmer

During the early 1930s, Hepburn home-schooled her two younger daughters, Marion and Margaret. Marion considered her mother "a natural-born teacher" who was "never happier than when introducing us children to some new book or idea."

She died unexpectedly of a cerebral hemorrhage in March 1951, at the age of 73.

== Legacy ==
In 1988, the Planned Parenthood Federation of America established the Katharine Houghton Hepburn Fund which provides emergency funding for the cause of reproductive rights. The regional Southern New England chapter of Planned Parenthood also sponsors a fund, the Hepburn Potter Society, "named in memory of two lifelong advocates of reproductive freedom." The Society offers membership to those who make a financial contribution.

In 1994, Hepburn was inducted into the Connecticut Women's Hall of Fame and included in the field of "Reformers."

In 2006, her alma mater Bryn Mawr opened the Katharine Houghton Hepburn Center in honor of Hepburn and her daughter, actress Katharine Hepburn, who graduated in 1928. The Center "inspires Bryn Mawr students and graduates to make a meaningful impact on the world."

== In popular culture ==
In the 2004 film The Aviator, Frances Conroy portrayed Katharine Martha Houghton Hepburn and Cate Blanchett played her daughter Katharine Hepburn. Blanchett received the Academy Award for Best Supporting Actress for her performance.

== See also ==
- Carrie Chapman Catt, M. Carey Thomas
- First-wave feminism, League of Women Voters, List of suffragists and suffragettes, National American Woman Suffrage Association
- Progressive Era, Comstock Laws, Silent Sentinels
