= Steuben Glass Works =

American art glass manufacturer

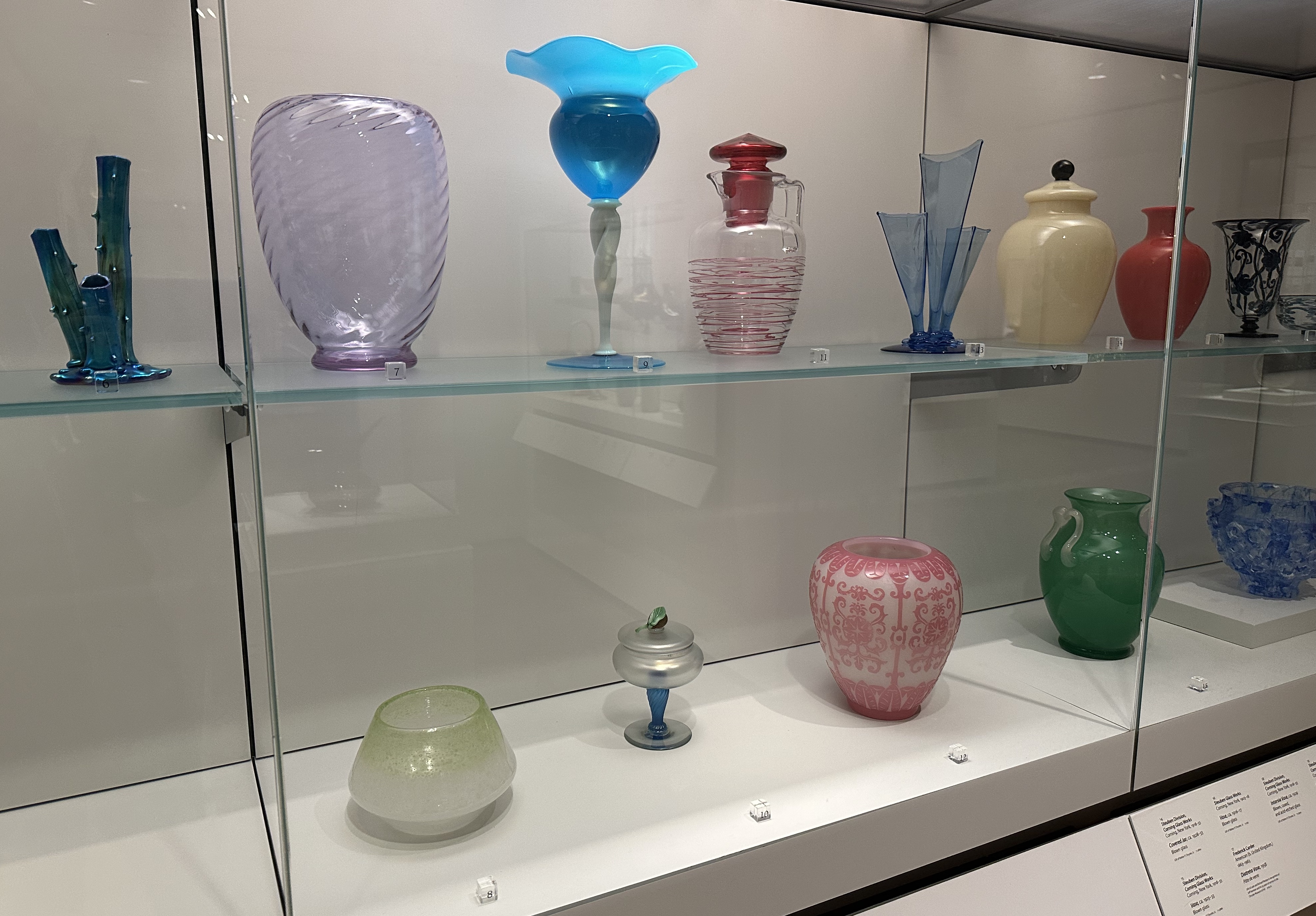
Steuben glassware at the Chrysler Museum of Art

Steuben Glass Works was an American art glass manufacturer, founded in 1903 by Frederick Carder and Thomas G. Hawkes in Corning, New York. Under Carder’s direction (1903–1932), Steuben produced a wide variety of colored and iridescent art glass, including its distinctive Aurene glass. Beginning in 1933, under the leadership of Arthur A. Houghton Jr., the company shifted to producing clear crystal glassware, including designs created in collaboration with prominent artists.

Steuben became part of Corning Glass Works in 1918 and was sold to Schottenstein Stores in 2008. The company ceased production in 2011 because of falling demand for luxury crystal glassware. In 2013, the Steuben brand resumed limited production through an arrangement with the Corning Museum of Glass to manufacture and sell its glassware.

== History ==
=== Founding and Carder period (1903–1932) ===
Henning Overstrom, glassblower, 1903

Steuben Glass Works was founded in 1903 by Frederick Carder and Thomas G. Hawkes in Corning, New York. The company was named after Steuben County, where Corning is located. Before establishing the company, Carder worked as a designer at the glass company, Stevens and Williams, in England, where he developed his skills in glassmaking and engraving. During a visit to the United States, he met Hawkes, whose glass engraving company was based in Corning, New York. Although the terms of their agreement are unknown, Hawkes is believed to have provided the financial backing, while Carder oversaw the company’s design, production, and management.

Steuben Glass Works, 1908

Steuben’s first factory occupied a former foundry on Erie Avenue in Corning, near railroad lines that provided access to coal supplies for its glass furnaces. Carder supervised the construction and installation of a ten-pot, coal-fired furnace in the converted foundry building.

Carder recruited 15 glassmakers from England, but they were denied entry to the United States and detained in Montreal. With the factory nearly ready for production but no glassmakers available, Carder hired experienced Swedish glassmakers from Dorflinger and other American glass manufacturers. Henning Overstrom, hired in 1903, was Steuben’s first glassblower. By late 1903, Steuben Glass Works was producing the glass blanks required for Hawkes's engraving business.

=== Development of colored and iridescent glass ===
Aurene glass vase, c. 1910

Steuben began producing cut glass and experimenting with colored glass. In September, 1904, Carder patented Aurene, a gold-toned iridescent glass similar to Louis Comfort Tiffany’s Favrile glass. Steuben soon became commercially successful.

Carder directed Steuben’s operations, from glass design and production to the development of glass formulas and sales policies. By 1912, additional buildings had been constructed to meet growing demand. Production peaked in 1916, when the company manufactured a wide range of tableware, decorative glass, and lighting fixtures in various colors and designs. By 1932, Carder had introduced approximately half of the company’s recorded glass colors and more than 8,000 designs.

=== Corning acquisition and financial difficulties ===
During World War I, the U.S. government classified Steuben as a nonessential manufacturer of luxury goods, preventing the company from purchasing raw materials reserved for the war effort. Facing possible closure, the company was sold to Corning Glass Works in 1918 and became its Steuben Division. Carder continued as managing director. The company greatly reduced its production of ornamental glass and began producing bulbs, tubing and optical glass.

The Wall Street crash of 1929 and the subsequent Great Depression led to declining sales at Steuben. Carder was directed to replace traditional glass designs with more modern styles. In February 1932, John MacKay replaced Carder as managing director, and Carder became art director of Corning Glass Works.

=== Clear crystal era (1933–2008) ===
Sidney Waugh vase, 1935

In 1933, Corning Glass Works appointed Arthur A. Houghton Jr. as president of Steuben. Under his leadership, the company adopted a more modern approach to glass design. Production of colored glass was gradually phased out in favor of clear crystal, using a new glass formula developed by Corning Glass Works. Steuben’s designers used the new material to create pieces with simpler, more fluid forms.

Under Houghton, Steuben expanded its retail presence, opening three shops on Fifth Avenue in New York City in 1934, followed by glass galleries in department stores across the United States. The company also collaborated with prominent artists, including Georgia O’Keeffe, Henri Matisse, Grant Wood, and Isamu Noguchi, who contributed drawings for designs engraved into Steuben crystal.

In the fall of 1934, Houghton appointed sculptor Sidney Waugh as Steuben’s chief designer. In the 1940s and 1950s, the company organized a series of international glass exhibitions featuring its glass designs. In 1951, it moved its glassmaking operations to a new factory attached to the Corning Glass Center, where visitors could watch crystal being made for the first time.

=== Sale, closure and continuation (2008–present) ===
In 2008, Corning Incorporated sold Steuben Glass for an undisclosed amount to Steuben Glass LLC, a newly formed subsidiary of Schottenstein Stores, a privately held investment company based in Columbus, Ohio. In 2011, Steuben Glass announced the closure of its factory in Corning, New York, and its flagship store on Madison Avenue in Manhattan. Company officials attributed the closure to declining demand for luxury crystal glassware, compounded by the economic downturn. In 2013, Corning Incorporated reached an agreement with the Corning Museum of Glass to resume limited production and sales of Steuben glass.

== Designers ==
Steuben’s designers included Sidney Waugh, known for his engraved glass designs, and James Houston, who worked with the company for four decades. Steuben also collaborated with artists and designers, including Dan Dailey (glass artist), Massimo Vignelli and Kiki Smith.

== Exhibitions and notable commissions ==
- In 1938, four Steuben pieces, including the Gazelle Bowl, entered the permanent collection of the Metropolitan Museum of Art.
- Steuben glass was exhibited at the 1939 New York World's Fair.
- In 1947, Steuben glassware was presented to Princess Elizabeth on the occasion of her wedding. The gifts included the Merry-Go-Round Bowl, Audubon plates, and a pair of candlesticks.
- In 1951, Steuben participated in L'Art du Verre, an exhibition held at the Musée des Arts Décoratifs in Paris.

== See also ==
- Tiffany glass
- Art Nouveau glass
- Corning Museum of Glass
