= Amory Houghton =

American diplomat (1899–1981)

- Amory Houghton (left), unknown date

United States Ambassador to France
- In office April 17, 1957 – January 19, 1961
- President: Dwight D. Eisenhower
- Preceded by: C. Douglas Dillon
- Succeeded by: James M. Gavin

President of the Boy Scouts of America
- In office 1946–1951
- Preceded by: Walter W. Head
- Succeeded by: John M. Schiff

Personal details
- Born: July 27, 1899 Corning, New York, U.S.
- Died: February 21, 1981 (aged 81) Charleston, South Carolina, U.S.
- Party: Republican
- Spouse: Laura DeKay Richardson (m. 1921)
- Relations: See Houghton family
- Children: 5, including Amory Jr., James
- Parent(s): Alanson B. Houghton; Adelaide Louise Wellington
- Education: Harvard University
- Awards: Legion of Honour

Amory Houghton (July 27, 1899 – February 21, 1981) served as United States ambassador to France from 1957 to 1961 and as national president of the Boy Scouts of America. He was chairman of the board of Corning Glass Works (1941–1961). In 1959 he was elected as an honorary member of the New York Society of the Cincinnati.

== Early life ==
Houghton was born on July 27, 1899, in Corning, New York. He was the only son of four children born to Adelaide Louise (née Wellington) Houghton and Alanson B. Houghton, who served as a United States representative from New York, as well as the U.S. ambassador to Germany and Great Britain. His second cousin was actress Katharine Hepburn.

He was educated at St. Paul's School in Concord, New Hampshire, and graduated from Harvard University in 1921.

== Career ==
After graduating from Harvard, Houghton began work in the blowing room of B Factory at Corning Glass Works (now Corning Incorporated) in 1921. In 1926, he became assistant to the president and two years later was elected executive vice-president.

In 1930, he became president and at the death of his father in 1941 chairman of the board. After leaving this position in 1961 he went on to serve as chairman of the executive committee from 1961 to 1964. He was then named chairman of the board again from 1964 to 1971.

Houghton served as a director of the National City Bank of New York (now Citibank), the Metropolitan Life Insurance Company (now MetLife), and the Erie Railroad. He was also on the Harvard Board of Overseers, was a trustee of the Institute for Advanced Study at Princeton, New Jersey, and was a trustee of Eisenhower College in Seneca Falls, New York.

=== Public service ===
Houghton began his career in government as a dollar-a-year man in 1941 when he was appointed assistant deputy director of the materials division in the Office of Production Management. An account cited that it was businessman Philip D. Reed who recruited him to the OPM. In this position, Houghton served as the liaison between the government and American manufacturers. It was reported that he was responsible for surmounting almost half the burden of the then production crisis.

In January 1942, President Franklin D. Roosevelt replaced the Office and Supply Priorities and Allocations Board with the War Production Board and Houghton was appointed deputy chief of the bureau of industry branches. By August of the same year, he resigned and did not serve any government position after a Hartford-Empire, subsidiary of Corning, faced an antitrust suit. He was also accused of monopolistic behavior and this particular case reached the Supreme Court.

From 1943 to 1944, he was appointed as the chief mission officer for the Lend-Lease Administration, a program by which the United States supplied the Allied nations with food, oil, warships, warplanes, and with other weaponry during World War II. He was forced to resign in 1943 due to antitrust problems with a Corning subsidiary.

On March 14, 1957, he was appointed the United States ambassador to France by President Dwight D. Eisenhower. He presented his credentials on April 17, 1957, and served until he left his post on January 19, 1961, shortly before President John F. Kennedy took office.

=== Scouting ===
Houghton received the Silver Buffalo Award in 1945 and served as the national president of the Boy Scouts of America from 1946 to 1951. He served on the World Scout Committee of the World Organization of the Scout Movement from 1949 to 1955. He was awarded the Bronze Wolf, the only distinction of the World Organization of the Scout Movement, awarded by the World Scout Committee for exceptional services to world Scouting, in 1955.

== Personal life ==
In 1921, Houghton was married to Laura DeKay Richardson (d. 2003), the daughter of James Richardson of Providence, Rhode Island. During his time as ambassador, his wife was referred to L'Ambassadrice Souriante (the Smiling Ambassadress) by the Herald Tribune. Together, they were the parents of five children, three sons and two daughters:

- Amory Houghton Jr. (1926–2020), who attended Harvard, worked at Corning, and served as a U.S. representative from New York.
- Alanson Bigelow Houghton II (1930–2016), who married Billie Fisher Carr (1932–2013) and worked at Corning, later becoming an ordained Episcopal priest.
- James Richardson Houghton (1936–2022), who also attended Harvard and worked at Corning.
- Elizabeth Houghton (1922–2018), who married Sidney James Weinberg Jr. (1923–2010), the son of Sidney Weinberg, the CEO of Goldman Sachs, in 1951.
- Laura DeKay Houghton (1938–2000), who married David Wells Beer, an architect in New York, in 1962.

Houghton died at the Medical University Hospital in Charleston, South Carolina, on February 21, 1981.

=== Descendants ===
Through his daughter Elizabeth, he was the grandfather of Elizabeth Livingston Weinberg, Sydney Houghton Weinberg, Peter Amory Weinberg (born 1957), the co-founder of Perella Weinberg Partners with merger specialist Joseph Perella in 2006.

== See also ==
- Houghton family

Diplomatic posts
Preceded by C. Douglas Dillon	U.S. ambassador to France; 1957–1961	Succeeded by James M. Gavin
Boy Scouts of America
Preceded by Walter W. Head	National president 1946–1951	Succeeded by John M. Schiff
