= E. E. Clive =

Welsh actor and director (1879–1940)

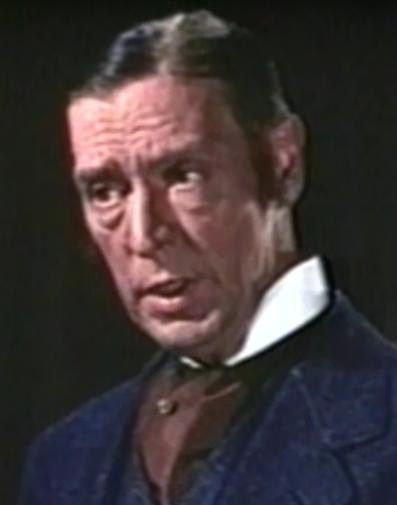
- Clive in the 1939 film The Little Princess.
- Born: Edward Erskholme Clive; 28 August 1879; Blaenavon, Monmouthshire, Wales
- Died: 6 June 1940 (aged 60); North Hollywood, California, U.S.
- Citizenship: British
- Years active: 1932–1940
- Spouse: Eleanor Ellis (m. 1915–1940)
- Partner: 1
- Children: David J. Clive (1923–2001)

Edward Erskholme Clive (28 August 1879 – 6 June 1940) was a Welsh stage actor and director who had a prolific acting career in Britain and America. He also played numerous supporting roles in Hollywood movies between 1933 and his death.

== Biography ==
E. E. Clive was born on 28 August 1879 in Blaenavon in Monmouthshire. He attended Pembroke Preparatory School and the University of Wales. His father, a minister, opposed Clive's becoming an actor. Clive studied for a medical career, and had completed four years of medical studies at St Bartholomew's Hospital before switching his focus to acting at age 22. Touring the provinces for a decade, Clive became an expert at virtually every sort of regional dialect in the British Isles. He moved to the U.S. in 1912, where after working in the Orpheum vaudeville circuit he set up his own stock company in Boston. By the 1920s, his company was operating in Hollywood; among his repertory players were such up-and-comers as Rosalind Russell. He also worked on Broadway in several plays. Clive's obituary in The New York Times stated that he acted in "1,159 Legitimate Plays Before Going into Moving Pictures".

Clive made his film debut as a village police constable in 1933's The Invisible Man with Claude Rains, then spent the next seven years showing up in wry supporting and bit parts, where he often portrayed comical versions of English stereotypes, sometimes also as a humourless authority figure. He often played butlers, reporters, aristocrats, shopkeepers and cabbies during his short film career. Though his roles were often small, Clive was a well-known and prolific character actor of his time. Among his best-known roles was the incompetent Burgomaster in James Whale's horror classic Bride of Frankenstein (1935). He was a semi-regular as 'Tenny the Butler' in Paramount Pictures' Bulldog Drummond "B" series starring John Howard; he also played butlers in other movies like Bachelor Mother with David Niven and Ginger Rogers. In 1939, Clive appeared in The Little Princess as the lawyer Mr. Barrows, and the first two entries of the classic Sherlock Holmes series starring Basil Rathbone. One of Clive's last roles was Sir William Lucas in the 1940 literature adaption Pride and Prejudice (1940) with Laurence Olivier and Greer Garson.

Clive died on 6 June 1940, of a heart ailment, in his Hollywood home. Clive was a member of the Euclid lodge of Freemasons in Boston.

== Complete filmography ==
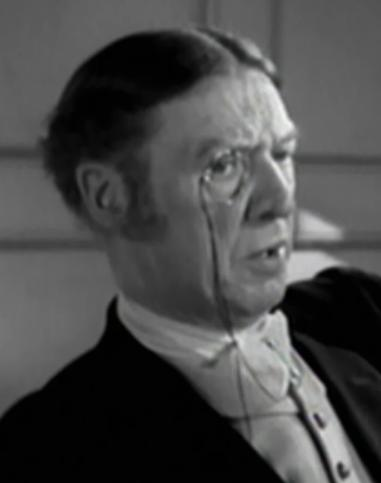
E.E. Clive as Sir Harry Lorradaile in David O. Selznick's Little Lord Fauntleroy

- Cheaters at Play (1932) – Steward
- Horse Play (1933) – Scotland Yard Officer (uncredited)
- The Invisible Man (1933) – Constable Jaffers
- Long Lost Father (1934) – Spot Hawkins
- The Poor Rich (1934) – Lord Fetherstone
- Riptide (1934) – Major Mills (uncredited)
- One More River (1934) – Chayne
- Bulldog Drummond Strikes Back (1934) – Bobby With Mustache
- Charlie Chan in London (1934) – Detective Sergeant Thacker
- The Gay Divorcee (1934) – Chief Customs Inspector (uncredited)
- Father Brown, Detective (1934) – Sergeant Dawes
- The Little Minister (1934) – Sheriff Greer (uncredited)
- Tin Pants (1934)
- David Copperfield (1935) – Sheriff's Man (uncredited)
- The Mystery of Edwin Drood (1935) – Mayor Thomas Sapsea
- Gold Diggers of 1935 (1935) – Westbrook – Thorpe's Chauffeur (uncredited)
- Bride of Frankenstein (1935) – Burgomaster
- We're in the Money (1935) – Jevons, Courtney's Butler
- Atlantic Adventure (1935) – McIntosh
- Page Miss Glory (1935) – Monogram Shirtmaker (uncredited)
- Three Kids and a Queen (1935) – Coachman (uncredited)
- A Feather in Her Hat (1935) – Higgins – Pub Proprietor (uncredited)
- Remember Last Night? (1935) – Coroner's Photographer (uncredited)
- The Man Who Broke the Bank at Monte Carlo (1935) – Waiter (uncredited)
- Stars Over Broadway (1935) – Crane
- Kind Lady (1935) – Gramophone Man (uncredited)
- A Tale of Two Cities (1935) – Judge in 'Old Bailey'
- Captain Blood (1935) – Clerk of the Court
- The Widow from Monte Carlo (1935) – Lord Holloway
- Sylvia Scarlett (1935) – Customs Inspector (uncredited)
- The Dark Hour (1936) – Foot, the Butler
- Little Lord Fauntleroy (1936) – Sir Harry Lorridaile
- Love Before Breakfast (1936) – Yacht Captain (uncredited)
- The Unguarded Hour (1936) – Lord Hathaway
- Dracula's Daughter (1936) – Sergeant Wilkes
- The King Steps Out (1936) – Tutor (uncredited)
- Show Boat (1936) – London Producer (uncredited)
- Trouble for Two (1936) – King
- The Golden Arrow (1936) – Walker
- Palm Springs (1936) – Morgan
- Ticket to Paradise (1936) – Barkins
- The White Angel (1936) – Dr. Smith, a Surgeon (uncredited)
- Piccadilly Jim (1936) – London Gossip Editor Bill Mechan
- Cain and Mabel (1936) – Charles Fendwick
- Libeled Lady (1936) – Fishing Instructor
- Isle of Fury (1936) – Dr. Hardy
- All American Chump (1936) – J. Montgomery Brantley
- The Charge of the Light Brigade (1936) – Sir Humphrey Harcourt
- Tarzan Escapes (1936) – Masters
- Lloyd's of London (1936) – Magistrate
- Camille (1936) – Saint Gaudens (uncredited)
- Bulldog Drummond Escapes (1937) – Tenny
- On the Avenue (1937) – Cabby
- They Wanted to Marry (1937) – Stiles
- Maid of Salem (1937) – Bilge
- Ready, Willing and Able (1937) – Sir Samuel Buffington (Credits) / Bloomington (in Film)
- Personal Property (1937) – Cosgrove Dabney
- Night Must Fall (1937) – Guide
- The Road Back (1937) – General (uncredited)
- The Emperor's Candlesticks (1937) – Auctioneer
- Love Under Fire (1937) – Captain Bowden
- Bulldog Drummond Comes Back (1937) – Tenny
- Danger – Love at Work (1937) – Wilbur
- It's Love I'm After (1937) – First Butler
- The Great Garrick (1937) – Pictures Vendor (uncredited)
- Live, Love and Learn (1937) – Mr. Palmiston
- Beg, Borrow or Steal (1937) – Lord Nigel Braemer
- Bulldog Drummond's Revenge (1937) – Tenny
- Arsène Lupin Returns (1938) – Alf
- The First Hundred Years (1938) – Chester Blascomb
- Bulldog Drummond's Peril (1938) – Tenny
- Kidnapped (1938) – Minister MacDougall
- Bulldog Drummond in Africa (1938) – Tenny
- Gateway (1938) – Room Steward
- Submarine Patrol (1938) – British Officer (uncredited)
- Arrest Bulldog Drummond (1938) – Tenny
- The Last Warning (1938) – Major Barclay
- Mr. Moto's Last Warning (1939) – Port Commandant General (uncredited)
- The Little Princess (1939) – Mr. Barrows
- I'm from Missouri (1939) – Mr. Arthur, Duke of Cricklewood
- Bulldog Drummond's Secret Police (1939) – Tenny
- The Hound of the Baskervilles (1939) – Cabby
- Rose of Washington Square (1939) – Barouche Driver
- Man About Town (1939) – Hotchkiss, Arlington's Butler
- Bachelor Mother (1939) – Merlin's Butler
- Bulldog Drummond's Bride (1939) – Tenny
- The Adventures of Sherlock Holmes (1939) – Inspector Bristol
- Raffles (1939) – Barraclough
- The Honeymoon's Over (1939) – Col. Shelby
- The Earl of Chicago (1940) – Mr. Redwood
- Congo Maisie (1940) – Horace Snell
- Adventure in Diamonds (1940) – Mr. MacPherson
- Pride and Prejudice (1940) – Sir William Lucas
- Foreign Correspondent (1940) – Mr. Naismith (uncredited)
- Flowing Gold (1940) – Mr. Naismith (uncredited) (final film role)
