= Neil Fitzgerald =

Irish actor (1893–1982)

- Photo from Theatre World: 1963-1964
- Born: 15 January 1893
- Died: 15 June 1982 (aged 89)
- Occupation: Film Actor
- Years active: 1934-1972

Neil Fitzgerald (15 January 1893 – 15 June 1982) was an Irish actor.

== Early life and education ==
Cornelius James Fitzgerald was born at Henry Street (now O'Brien Street), Tipperary, the son of James Joseph Fitzgerald, a grocer, and Ellen McGrath. He was educated in Trinity College Dublin, studying pharmacy, but chose to become an actor.

== Career ==
He made his Broadway debut in Leave Her to Heaven in 1940. He appeared in numerous Irish plays on Broadway during his life. His credited film debut was in 1935 in John Ford's The Informer as "Tommy Connor". He had numerous television credits also.

== Death ==
He died in 1982 in Princeton, New Jersey.

== Filmography ==
Year	Title	Role	Notes
1934	What Every Woman Knows	Shand's Friend	Uncredited
1935	The Gilded Lily	English Waiter	Uncredited
1935	Vanessa: Her Love Story	Army Doctor	Uncredited
1935	Bride of Frankenstein	Rudy	Uncredited
1935	$10 Raise	Warehouse Worker	Uncredited
1935	The Informer	Tommy Connor	
1935	Charlie Chan in Shanghai	Dakin	
1935	The Perfect Gentleman	Hotel Waiter	Uncredited
1936	Anything Goes	Sound Man	Uncredited
1936	The Unguarded Hour	Larkin - Helen's Chauffeur	Uncredited
1936	The King Steps Out	Captain	Uncredited
1936	The White Angel	Officer in Barracks	Uncredited
1936	Mary of Scotland	Nobleman	
1936	Charlie Chan at the Race Track	Minor Role	Uncredited
1936	The Plough and the Stars	Langon	
1937	Lost Horizon	Radio Operator	Uncredited
1937	The Thirteenth Chair	Constable	
1937	Parnell	Pigott / Dr. Gillespie	
1937	London by Night	Inspector Sleet	
1937	Lancer Spy	Orderly	Uncredited
1938	International Settlement	British Clerk	Uncredited
1938	Holiday	Edgar	Uncredited
1938	Kidnapped	English Officer	Uncredited
1938	Marie Antoinette	First Councilor	Uncredited
1938	Bulldog Drummond in Africa	McTurk	
1938	Arrest Bulldog Drummond	Sir Malcolm McLeonard	
1939	Mr. Moto's Last Warning	English Sergeant	Uncredited
1939	Sergeant Madden	Casey (police broadcaster)	
1939	Bulldog Drummond's Secret Police	Stationmaster	
1939	Bulldog Drummond's Bride	Evan Barrows	
1939	The Adventures of Sherlock Holmes	Clerk of the Court	Uncredited
1939	Rulers of the Sea	Dr. Taylor on Steamship	Uncredited
1952	Hollywood Off-Beat	Jim Bender	
1953	Niagara	Customs Officer	Uncredited
1965	Mirage	Joe Turtle	
1972	Savages	Sir Harry	(final film role)
