= Heather Angel (actress) =

British actress (1909–1986)

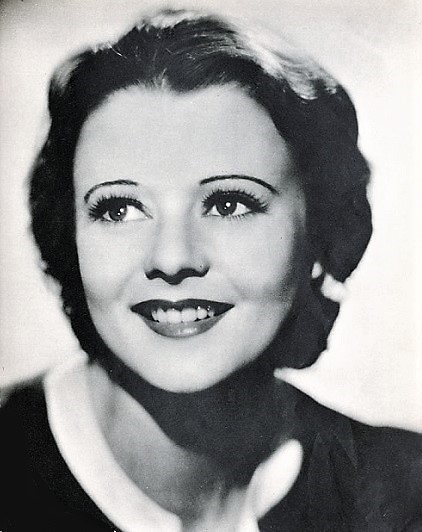
- Angel in 1934
- Born: Heather Grace Angel; 9 February 1909; Oxford, England
- Died: 13 December 1986 (aged 77); Los Angeles, California, US
- Occupation: Actress
- Years active: 1931–1979
- Known for: Peter Pan; Alice in Wonderland; The Three Musketeers; The Last of the Mohicans; The Informer
- Spouses: Ralph Forbes (m. 1934; div. 1941) Robert B. Sinclair (m. 1944; died 1970)
- Children: 1
- Awards: Hollywood Walk of Fame

Heather Grace Angel (9 February 1909 – 13 December 1986) was a British actress. She was known for providing the voice of Mrs. Darling, Wendy's mother in Peter Pan (1953) and Alice's sister in Alice in Wonderland (1951).

== Early life ==
Angel was born 9 February 1909 in Oxford, England. She was the daughter of Mary Letitia Stock and Andrea Angel, an Oxford University chemistry lecturer and initially a don at Brasenose College and later at Christ Church. They were married in 1904 and, after the wedding, they moved to Banbury Road. Andrea Angel's maternal grandfather was an Italian refugee, and Andrea was named after his uncle Andrea Rabagliati.

In the 1911 UK Census, the family is shown as living at 17 Banbury Road, Oxford, along with three servants. She was the younger of two sisters.

Andrea Angel was killed in the Silvertown explosion in January 1917, and posthumously awarded the Edward Medal (First Class). In his will, he left his wife £374 and shortly thereafter, his wife moved to London with the two daughters. By 1929, when Heather was 19, she was already appearing with an overseas touring theatre company managed by Charles Bradbury-Ingles. The same record shows that she was living at 20 Queen Anne's Grove, London W4, when she left.

== Career ==
=== Stage ===
Angel began her stage career at the Old Vic in 1926 and later appeared with touring companies. Her Broadway debut came in December 1937 in Love of Women at the Golden Theatre. She also appeared in The Wookey (1941–42).

=== Film ===
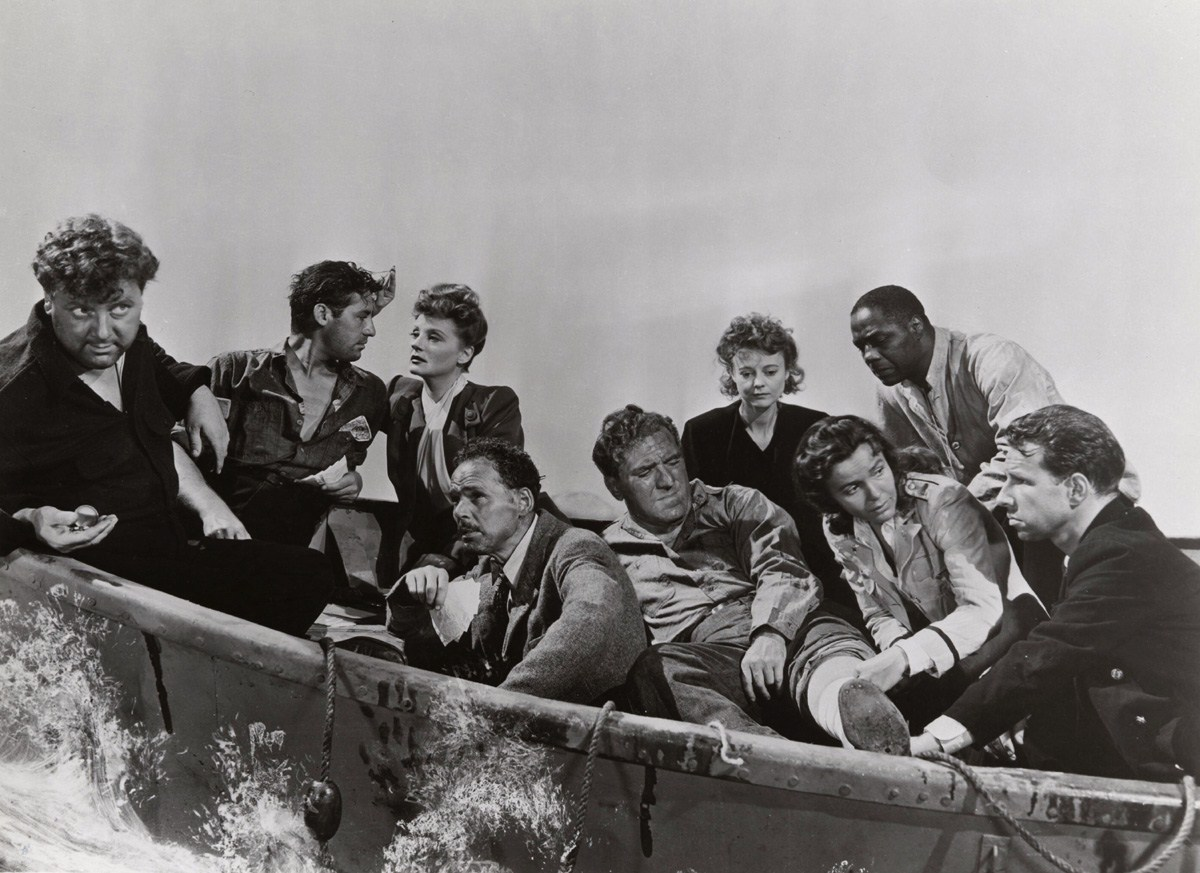
L–R: Walter Slezak, John Hodiak, Tallulah Bankhead, Henry Hull, William Bendix, Heather Angel, Mary Anderson, Canada Lee, and Hume Cronyn in Alfred Hitchcock's Lifeboat (1944)

Angel appeared in many British films. She made her first screen appearance in City of Song. She later had a leading role in Night in Montmartre (1931), and followed this success with The Hound of the Baskervilles (1932). She then decided to move to Hollywood. She sailed on the Majestic to New York on 21 December 1932 with her mother. Over the next few years, she played strong roles in such films as The Mystery of Edwin Drood (1935), The Three Musketeers (1935), The Informer (1935) and The Last of the Mohicans (1936).

In 1937 she made the first of five appearances as Phyllis Clavering in the popular Bulldog Drummond series. She was cast as Kitty Bennet in Pride and Prejudice (1940) and as the maid, Ethel, in Suspicion (1941). Angel was also the leading lady in the first screen version of Raymond Chandler's The High Window, released in 1942 as Time to Kill. She was one of the passengers of Alfred Hitchcock's Lifeboat (1944). Her film appearances in the following years were few, but she returned to Hollywood to provide voices for the Walt Disney animated films Alice in Wonderland (1951) and Peter Pan (1953). From 1964 until 1965, she played a continuing role in the television soap opera Peyton Place. After that role, she played Miss Faversham, a nanny and female friend of Sebastian Cabot's character of Giles French in the situation comedy Family Affair.

== Personal life ==
Angel married actor Ralph Forbes in Arizona in 1934, a union that lasted less than ten years. Angel had acted with Henry Wilcoxon in Self Made Lady (1932) when they were both in Britain. When she heard Wilcoxon was also in Hollywood, she contacted him. She invited him to polo matches at the home of Will Rogers and later taught him horseback riding. They acted together in two other films: The Last of the Mohicans (1936) and Lady Hamilton (1941). Though they remained lifelong friends, they never married. Heather and her husband were both present at the wedding of Wilcoxon to his first wife. They had intended to host the wedding at their house in Coldwater Canyon.

Angel married Robert B. Sinclair (1905–1970), a film and television director, in 1944. On 4 January 1970, an intruder, Billy McCoy Hunter, broke into their home. When Sinclair attempted to protect Angel, Hunter killed him in her presence, then fled. He was allegedly found with a knife and a pistol when arrested. The incident is believed to have been a failed burglary. Angel had one son with Sinclair in 1947.

== Death ==
On 13 December 1986, Angel died of cancer in Los Angeles. She was cremated at Santa Barbara Cemetery.

== Recognition ==
Angel has a motion pictures star on the Hollywood Walk of Fame for her contributions to the film industry. Her star is located at 6301 Hollywood Boulevard.

== Filmography ==
Year	Film	Role	Director	Notes
1931	City of Song	Carmela	Carmine Gallone	
1931	A Night in Montmartre	Annette Lefevre	Leslie S. Hiscott	
1931	The Hound of the Baskervilles	Beryl Stapleton	Gareth Gundrey	
1932	Frail Women	Girl	Maurice Elvey	uncredited
1932	Self Made Lady	Sookey (Sue Lee) Roberts	George King	
1932	Mr. Bill the Conqueror	Rosemary Lannick	Norman Walker	
1932	After Office Hours	Pat	Thomas Bentley	
1932	Men of Steel	Ann Ford	George King	
1933	Pilgrimage	Suzanne	John Ford	
1933	Charlie Chan's Greatest Case	Carlotte Eagan	Hamilton MacFadden	
1933	Berkeley Square	Helen Pettigrew	Frank Lloyd	
1933	Early to Bed	Grete	Ludwig Berger	
1934	Orient Express	Coral Musker	Paul Martin	
1934	Murder in Trinidad	Joan Cassell	Louis King	
1934	Romance in the Rain	Cynthia Brown	Stuart Walker	
1934	Springtime for Henry	Miss Smith	Frank Tuttle	
1935	The Mystery of Edwin Drood	Rosa Bud	Stuart Walker	
1935	It Happened in New York	Chris Edwards	Alan Crosland	
1935	The Informer	Mary McPhillip	John Ford	
1935	The Headline Woman	Myrna Van Buren	William Nigh	
1935	The Three Musketeers	Constance	Rowland V. Lee	
1935	The Imperfect Lady	Evelyn Alden	Tim Whelan	
1936	The Last of the Mohicans	Cora	George B. Seitz	
1936	Daniel Boone	Virginia Randolph	David Howard	
1936	The Bold Caballero	Lady Isabella Palma	Wells Root	
1937	Bulldog Drummond Escapes	Phyllis Clavering	James P. Hogan	
1937	Western Gold	Jeannie Thatcher	Howard Bretherton	
1937	Portia on Trial	Elizabeth Manners	George Nicholls Jr.	
1937	The Duke Comes Back	Susan Corbin Foster	Irving Pichel	
1938	Bulldog Drummond in Africa	Phyllis Clavering	Louis King	
1938	Army Girl	Mrs. Gwen Bradley	George Nicholls Jr.	
1938	Arrest Bulldog Drummond	Phyllis Clavering	James P. Hogan	
1939	Bulldog Drummond's Secret Police	Phyllis Clavering	James P. Hogan	
1939	Undercover Doctor	Cynthia Weld	Louis King	
1939	Bulldog Drummond's Bride	Phyllis Clavering	James P. Hogan	
1940	Half a Sinner	Anne Gladden	Al Christie	
1940	Pride and Prejudice	Kitty Bennet	Robert Z. Leonard	
1940	Kitty Foyle	Wife in Prologue	Sam Wood	uncredited
1941	Shadows on the Stairs	Sylvia Armitage	D. Ross Lederman	
1941	That Hamilton Woman	A Streetgirl	Alexander Korda	
1941	Singapore Woman	Frieda	Jean Negulesco	
1941	Suspicion	Ethel (Maid)	Alfred Hitchcock	
1942	The Undying Monster	Helga Hammond	John Brahm	
1942	Time to Kill	Myrle Davis	Herbert I. Leeds	
1943	Cry 'Havoc'	Andra	Richard Thorpe	
1944	Lifeboat	Mrs. Higley	Alfred Hitchcock	
1944	Three Sisters of the Moors	Anne Brontë		Short
1944	In the Meantime, Darling	Mrs. Nelson	Otto Preminger	
1948	The Saxon Charm	Vivian Saxon	Claude Binyon	
1951	Alice in Wonderland	Margaret, Alice's sister		Voice
1953	Peter Pan	Mrs. Darling		Voice
1962	The Premature Burial	Kate Carrell	Roger Corman	
1975	Gone with the West	Old Little Moon / Narrator	Bernard Girard	
1979	Backstairs at the White House	Mrs. Wallace		

== Bibliography ==
- Wilcoxon, Henry; Orrison, Katherine (1991). Lionheart in Hollywood: the autobiography of Henry Wilcoxon. Metuchen, NJ and London: The Scarecrow Press, Inc. ISBN 0-8108-2476-0.
