= John Sutton (actor) =

British actor (1908–1963)

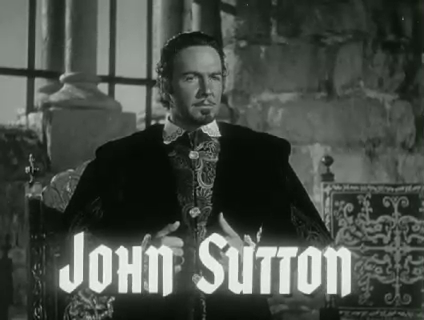
- Sutton in Captain from Castile (1947)
- Born: Eugene Osmond Stephen Congdon; 22 October 1908; Rawalpindi, Punjab, British India
- Died: 10 July 1963 (aged 54); Cannes, France
- Occupation: Actor
- Years active: 1936–1963
- Spouses: Charlotte Biddle Barrett (m. 1933; div. 1946) Roberta Fidler (m. 1946; div. 1955) Anita Rodney-Eden (m. 1957; annul. 1960)

John Sutton (born Eugene Osmond Stephen Congdon; 22 October 1908 – 10 July 1963) was a British actor with a prolific career in Hollywood of more than 30 years.

== Personal life ==
Sutton was born on 22 October 1908 in Rawalpindi, India (now Rawalpindi, Punjab, Pakistan). He was the son of Lt. Colonel Arthur Congdon (1861-1924) of the Royal Munster Fusiliers and his wife Ann Bell Sutton Moxley Congdon. Before moving to Hollywood as an actor, he was a tea planter in Assam, India, and, failing that, he farmed for a while in South Africa. Upon being naturalized as a U.S. citizen while serving in the U.S. Navy in 1943 during the Second World War, he legally changed his name to John Sutton.

Sutton was married at least three times. In 1933, he married wealthy socialite Charlotte Biddle Barrett. In the 1940 federal census, the household included his wife Charlotte and her daughter from a previous marriage. In October 1946, he divorced his high society wife and married Roberta Fidler, former wife of newspaper columnist and radio commentator Jimmie Fidler; this rather stormy second marriage ended in divorce in 1955. He married dancer Anita Rodney-Eden in 1957, but he received an annulment in 1960, when it was shown that she was still legally the ninth wife of oft-married (13 marriages to 11 women) Tommy Manville. He died suddenly of a heart attack on 10 July 1963.

== Filmography ==
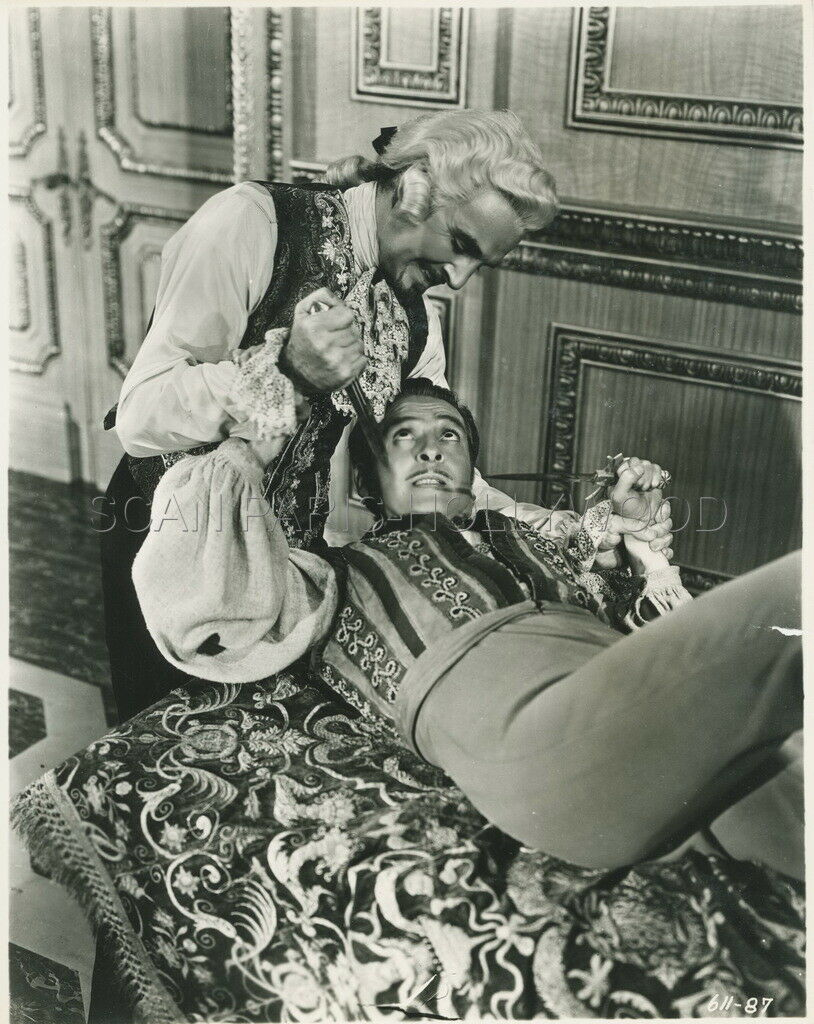
Sutton (with knife) and Arturo de Córdova in Adventures of Casanova (1948)

- The House of a Thousand Candles (1936) as Young Man (uncredited)
- Federal Agent (1936) as Elevator Operator (uncredited)
- The Princess Comes Across (1936) as Ship's Passenger at Baggage Check / At Concert (uncredited)
- The Last of the Mohicans (1936) as British officer, Fort Henry (uncredited)
- Bulldog Drummond Comes Back (1937) as Sanger
- Bulldog Drummond's Revenge (1937) as Jennings, Nielson's Secretary
- The Buccaneer (1938) as British Officer Before Battle (uncredited)
- Mad About Music (1938) as Photographer (uncredited)
- Bulldog Drummond's Peril (1938) as Doctor (uncredited)
- Fools for Scandal (1938) as Bruce Devon (uncredited)
- Four Men and a Prayer (1938) as Capt. Drake
- The Adventures of Robin Hood (1938) as Richard's Knight (uncredited)
- Kidnapped (1938) as English Officer (uncredited)
- Blond Cheat (1938) as Fred Percy
- Booloo (1938) as Ferguson
- The Affairs of Annabel (1938) as Man at Newsstand (uncredited)
- Arrest Bulldog Drummond (1939) as Inspector Tredennis (uncredited)
- The Dawn Patrol (1938) as Adjutant (uncredited)
- Zaza (1939) as Dandy (uncredited)
- I'm from Missouri (1939) as Subaltern (uncredited)
- Sons of Liberty (1939, Short) as Hessian Courier (uncredited)
- Susannah of the Mounties (1939) as Corporal Piggott
- Bulldog Drummond's Bride (1939) as Inspector Tredennis
- The Private Lives of Elizabeth and Essex (1939) as Capt. Armand of the Queen's Guard (uncredited)
- Tower of London (1939) as John Wyatt
- Charlie McCarthy, Detective (1939) as Bill Banning
- The Invisible Man Returns (1940) as Doctor Frank Griffin
- Sandy Is a Lady (1940) (uncredited)
- I Can't Give You Anything But Love, Baby (1940) as Boston
- South to Karanga (1940) as David Wallace
- The Sea Hawk (1940) as Captain of the Guard (uncredited)
- Murder Over New York (1940) as Richard Jeffery
- Hudson's Bay (1941) as Lord Edward Crewe
- A Very Young Lady (1941) as Dr. Franklin Meredith
- A Yank in the R.A.F. (1941) as Wing Commander Morley
- Moon Over Her Shoulder (1941) as Dr. Phillip Rossiter
- My Gal Sal (1942) as Fred Haviland
- Ten Gentlemen from West Point (1942) as Howard Shelton
- Thunder Birds (1942) as Peter Stackhouse
- Tonight We Raid Calais (1943) as Geoffrey Carter
- Jane Eyre (1943) as Dr. Rivers
- The Hour Before the Dawn (1944) as Roger Hetherton
- Claudia and David (1946) as Phil Dexter
- Captain from Castile (1947) as Diego De Silva
- Adventures of Casanova (1948) as Count de Brissac
- The Counterfeiters (1948) as Jeff MacAllister
- Mickey (1948) as Ted Whitney
- The Three Musketeers (1948) as The Duke of Buckingham
- The Fan (1949) as Cecil Graham
- Bride of Vengeance (1949) as Prince Bisceglie
- Bagdad (1949) as Raizul
- The Second Woman (1950) as Keith Ferris
- The Second Face (1950) as Jerry Allison
- Payment on Demand (1951) as Anthony Tunliffe
- David and Bathsheba (1951) as Ira
- Fireside Theatre (1951, TV Series)
- 5 Fingers (1952) as Narrator (voice, uncredited)
- Thief of Damascus (1952) as Khalid
- Lady in the Iron Mask (1952) as Duke de Valdac
- The Schaefer Century Theatre (1952, TV Series)
- Captain Pirate (1952) as Capt. Hilary Evans
- The Golden Hawk (1952) as Captain Luis del Toro
- My Cousin Rachel (1952) as Ambrose Ashley
- Sangaree (1953) as Harvey Bristol
- East of Sumatra (1953) as Daniel Catlin
- Lux Video Theatre (1954, TV Series) as Evan
- Private Secretary (1954, TV Series) as King Price
- General Electric Theater (1954–1955, TV Series) as Ted Preston / Tom Wickers
- Four Star Playhouse (1956, TV Series) as Rene Champion
- Playwrights '56 (1956, TV Series) as Mr. Black
- Studio 57 (1956, TV Series) as Mark Brinker
- The Count of Monte Cristo (1956, TV Series) as De Villefort
- Death of a Scoundrel (1956) as The Actor as 'Tom' in Stage Play
- The Amazon Trader (1956) as The Amazon Trader
- Tales of the 77th Bengal Lancers (1956, TV Series)
- Schlitz Playhouse of Stars (1958, TV Series)
- The United States Steel Hour (1958, TV Series) as Colonel Resnor
- Tumulto de Paixões (1958) as John Morgan
- The Californians (1958, TV Series) as Sam Crawford
- Behind Closed Doors (1958–1959, TV Series) as Harry Shaw
- Tombstone Territory (1959, TV Series) as David Armbruster
- Return of the Fly (1959) as Insp. Beecham
- The Bat (1959) as Warner, the chauffeur
- Beloved Infidel (1959) as Lord Donegall
- The Man From Blackhawk (1959, TV Series) as Bart Mason
- Bat Masterson (1959, TV Series) as Orrin Thackeray / Andrew Stafford
- 77 Sunset Strip (1959, TV Series) as Ralph Anderson
- Disneyland (1959–1960, The Swamp Fox TV Series) as Colonel Banastre Tarleton
- The Rebel (1960, TV Series) as C. Spencer Scott—The Earl of Durango / Gold Seeker
- Men into Space (1959–1960, TV Series) as Air Vice Marshal Malcolm Terry
- The Aquanauts (1960, TV Series) as Tony Randolph
- The Case of the Dangerous Robin (1960, TV Series)
- Stagecoach West (1961, TV Series) as Robert Allison / Rexford Jasper
- The Canadians (1961) as Superintendent Walker
- Checkmate (1961, TV Series) as George Parker
- The Brothers Brannagan (1961, TV Series) as John Elliot
- Perry Mason (1961, TV Series) as Clifton Barlow
- Rawhide (1961, TV Series) as Lord Ashton
- Shadow of Fear (1964) as Peter Halliday
- Of Human Bondage (1964) as Kingsford (uncredited) (final film role)
