= The Mad Doctor (1941 film) =

1941 film by Tim Whelan

- Theatrical release poster
- Directed by: Tim Whelan
- Written by: Howard J. Green; Ben Hecht; Charles MacArthur
- Produced by: George M. Arthur
- Starring: Basil Rathbone; Ellen Drew; John Howard
- Cinematography: Ted Tetzlaff
- Edited by: Archie Marshek
- Music by: Victor Young
- Production company: Paramount Pictures
- Distributed by: Paramount Pictures
- Release date: February 14, 1941
- Running time: 90 minutes
- Country: United States
- Language: English

The Mad Doctor is a 1941 American crime thriller film directed by Tim Whelan and starring Basil Rathbone as a physician whose successive wealthy wives die. Ellen Drew plays his latest bride. John Howard plays her ex-fiancé, who grows increasingly suspicious of her new husband. It was produced and distributed by Hollywood studio Paramount Pictures.

== Plot ==
A sophisticated but murderous physician woos, weds, and murders several of his wealthy female patients for their fortunes. The women appear to have died prematurely, with their above-suspicion doctor-husband diagnosing their deaths as the imminent result of disease. The doctor's loyal male assistant tampers with the victims buried bodies in order to hide the incriminating evidence. The ex-fiancé of the doctor's latest bride is able to save her from suffering the same fate of her predecessors, while also informing the authorities of just how the women died. With the police coming for him, the doctor has no recourse but suicide, in the form of a fatal plunge from a skyscraper.

== Cast ==
- Basil Rathbone as Dr. George Sebastian / Dr. Frederick Langamann
- Ellen Drew as Linda Boothe
- John Howard as Gil Sawyer
- Barbara Jo Allen as Louise Watkins
- Ralph Morgan as Dr. Charles Downer
- Martin Kosleck as Maurice Gretz
- Kitty Kelly as Winnie
- Hugh O'Connell as Lawrence Watkins
- William 'Billy' Benedict as Mickey Barnes
- Henry Victor as Furber
- Douglas Kennedy as Hotel Clerk
- George Chandler as Elevator Operator
- Edward Earle as Librarian
- Howard M. Mitchell as Butler
- Max Wagner as Taxicab Driver
- Sheila Ryan as Hostess at Charity Bazaar
- Wanda McKay as Woman at Charity Bazaar
- Norma Varden as Woman at Charity Bazaar

== Production ==
The Mad Doctor was in production from January 22 until mid-March 1940, and was released February 14, 1941. Paramount Pictures credits Howard J. Green for the screenplay, but early drafts titled The Monster and Destiny were written by Ben Hecht and Charles MacArthur. Before he accepted a role in the film, Basil Rathbone required changes to the script.

== Reception ==
The Hollywood Reporter called the film "one of the top efforts of its type", which it attributed to the "beautifully imaginative direction of Tim Whelan and the stunning performance of Basil Rathbone".
