= Bulldog Drummond Escapes =

1937 film by James P. Hogan

- Directed by: James P. Hogan
- Written by: Edward T. Lowe Jr.
- Based on: Bulldog Drummond Again play by Herman C. McNeile; Gerard Fairlie
- Produced by: Edward T. Lowe Jr.
- Starring: Ray Milland; Heather Angel; Guy Standing; Reginald Denny
- Cinematography: Victor Milner
- Edited by: William Shea
- Music by: Boris Morros
- Production company: Paramount Pictures
- Distributed by: Paramount Pictures
- Release date: January 22, 1937
- Running time: 67 minutes
- Country: United States
- Language: English

Bulldog Drummond Escapes is a 1937 American mystery thriller film directed by James P. Hogan and starring Ray Milland as Captain Hugh "Bulldog" Drummond alongside Heather Angel and Reginald Denny. Paramount continued with the Bulldog Drummond series, producing seven more films over the next two years. They replaced Milland with John Howard.

== Plot ==
Captain Hugh 'Bulldog' Drummond has just returned to England and as he is driving home in the dark, a young woman jumps out in front of his car. He misses her, but she falls to the ground. As he tries to revive her, he hears a shout for help, then gunshots and when he goes to investigate, the woman drives away in his car. He is soon able to trace her to nearby Greystone Manor and when he goes there to meet her she introduces herself as Phyllis Clavering and urges him to help her get out of a desperate situation.

== Cast ==
- Ray Milland as Capt. Hugh "Bulldog" Drummond
- Sir Guy Standing as Inspector Col. Sir Reginald Nielson
- Heather Angel as Miss Phyllis Clavering
- Reginald Denny as Algy Longworth
- Porter Hall as Maj. Norman Merridew
- Fay Holden as Mrs. Natalie Seldon, Maj. Merridew's sister (also referred to as Miss Seldon)
- E.E. Clive as "Tenny" Tennison
- Walter Kingsford as "Professor" Stanton
- Charles McNaughton as Chief Constable Higgins
- Clyde Cook as Constable Alf
- Frank Elliott as Bailey
- David Clyde as Gower
- Doris Lloyd as nurse
- Ernie Stanton as reporter (uncredited)

== Bibliography ==
- Backer, Ron. Mystery Movie Series of 1930s Hollywood. McFarland, 2012.
