= Isle of Missing Men =

1942 film by Richard Oswald

- Directed by: Richard Oswald
- Written by: Richard Oswald; Robert Chapin
- Screenplay by: Edward Eliscu; Robert Chapin
- Based on: White Lady play by Ladislas Fodor; Gina Kaus
- Produced by: Richard Oswald
- Starring: John Howard; Helen Gilbert; Gilbert Roland
- Cinematography: Paul Ivano
- Edited by: Jack Dennis
- Music by: Edward Kay
- Production company: Richard Oswald Productions
- Distributed by: Monogram Pictures
- Release date: August 18, 1942
- Running time: 67 min.
- Country: United States
- Language: English

Isle of Missing Men is a 1942 American drama film directed by Richard Oswald and starring John Howard, Helen Gilbert and Gilbert Roland. In the film, a young woman receives an invitation from the governor of an island prison to spend a week with him. She does so, but conceals the fact that her husband is being held as a convict on the island.

== Plot summary ==
Merrill Hammond (John Howard), governor on the prison island of Caruba, is traveling with S.S. Bombay towards Australia. The ship is attacked by Japanese bombers and the ship has to return to Caruba. Merrill invites one of the other passengers, a woman named Diana Bryce (Helen Gilbert), to stay at his place while they wait for another transport.

The island inhabitants are few; there is Doc Brown (Alan Mowbray), the prison doctor and George Kent (Bradley Page), prison administrator.

Diana gets to stay in a house that Merrill originally built for his wife, who died shortly after her arrival to the island. Her presence is not appreciated by Kent, who dislikes the idea of a woman living there. Diana is interested in the prisoners and expresses a wish to see them.

Soon after Doc Brown tells of a typhoid epidemic on the island. While the four inhabitants have dinner one night, they are watched by Dan Curtis (Gilbert Roland), one of the convicts, who has been found guilty of murder. The others are unaware that Diana is in fact Dan's wife. Dan is discovered and sent back to his room.

In the night, Diana secretly meets Dan and explains that she is there to set him free. He tells her he will try to escape, but she wants him to wait until his retrial, where she will help him get a new verdict. Kent hears someone talking and is about to investigate, when Merrill comes around and leaves Diana a book, this interrupting Kent in his search. Diana gives her money and jewels to Dan to help him in his escape.

Kent looks closer into Curtis' background, and finds the jewels when he searches his room. To avoid surprises he puts Curtis in an isolation cell, which makes it impossible for him to break out.

Diana tries to get Brown on her side, telling him about her husband. She wants the doctor to tell the others that Curtis has died from the epidemic and help him escape. The doctor agrees.

While Diana is left alone in the doctor's office, she happens to look into Curtis' records and finds out that he is a pathological liar and two-timer. She is appalled by this, and when Curtis has been safely stored on a ship on its away from the island, she tells him she will leave him because she doesn't love him anymore.

The doctor tells Merrill what he has done, but Merrill lets Curtis escape because of Diana, whom he has fallen in love with. When Kent questions his decisions and judgement, he resigns his position.

During a fight aboard the ship, Curtis is killed, and Diana returns to the island to look for Merrill. She finds him and confesses her love for him, and they leave the island together.

== Cast ==
- John Howard as Merrill Hammond
- Helen Gilbert as Diana Bryce
- Gilbert Roland as Thomas 'Dan' Bentley, alias Curtis
- Alan Mowbray as Doctor Henry Brown
- Bradley Page as George Kent
- George Chandler as Bar Steward
- Ernie Adams as Captain Sanchez of the Mariposa
- Geraldine Gray as Sally - Ship Passenger
- Egon Brecher as Richard Heller
- Kitty O'Neil as Nurse Pauline
- Kenne Duncan as Bob Henderson
- Charles Williams as Jo-Jo
- Dewey Robinson as Prisoner Tony
- Alex Havier as Sani

== Production ==
The film was made by Oswald for the Poverty Row studio Monogram Pictures. Oswald was an exiled Austrian director who had fled Germany when the Nazis came to power going back to Austria, then to the Netherlands, to France and finally to Hollywood where he made a handful of films. His son, Gerd Oswald, was assistant director and later went on to a career as a well-regarded director himself.

== Bibliography ==
- Langman, Larry. Destination Hollywood: The Influence of Europeans on American Filmmaking. McFarland & Co, 2000.
