= Tight Shoes (film) =

1941 film by Albert S. Rogell

- Directed by: Albert S. Rogell
- Based on: Tight Shoes by Damon Runyon
- Produced by: Jules Levey
- Starring: Leo Carrillo; John Howard; Broderick Crawford
- Cinematography: Elwood Bredell
- Edited by: Otto Ludwig
- Music by: Hans J. Salter
- Production company: Universal Pictures
- Distributed by: Universal Pictures
- Release date: June 13, 1941
- Running time: 67 minutes
- Country: United States
- Language: English

Tight Shoes is a 1941 American comedy film directed by Albert S. Rogell and starring Leo Carrillo, John Howard, and Broderick Crawford. It is based on the Damon Runyon story. The film was produced and distributed as second feature by Universal Pictures.

== Plot ==
Shoe store owner Amalfi is forced by crook Speedy Miller to allow the business to be a front for illegal gambling. Miller works for a crime boss Horace Grover "the Brain", managing editor of a newspaper. Jimmy Rupert is a clerk in the store and sells a pair of shoes to Miller that are too small and hurt his feet. Distracted by his pinched feet in the "tight shoes", Miller places a losing bet on the horse named Feet First.

A fight ensues with his girlfriend Sybil Ash and she leaves him. He blames his loss on Rupert and gets him fired from the shoe store. In response, Rupert complains about crooked politicians who allow crime to flourish, and successfully runs for office. He is opposed by the newspaper, but supported by Miller's ex-girlfriend Sybil Ash. On the day he wins the election, Rupert and Ash are engaged to be married. Amalfi ends up hiring Miller as a clerk in his store. On the wedding day, Miller sends a pair of "tight shoes" to Rupert as a wedding gift but Ruth, Jimmy's ex-girlfriend, suspects the shoebox is actually a bomb. After he delivers the shoes, Miller is knocked out by Ruth, who explains to Ash her conviction about the "bomb." The two women start fighting, with Jimmy in the middle. Jimmy stops the fight by throwing Ash into a flower arrangement. Miller wakes up, but before he can strike Jimmy, he is stopped by Grover, whom he exposes as The Brain. When Grover exits with the district attorney, the two couples begin fighting, and eventually become reunited and married as originally intended.

== Cast ==
- Leo Carrillo as Amalfi
- John Howard as Jimmy Rupert
- Broderick Crawford as Speedy Miller
- Edward Gargan as Blooch
- Binnie Barnes as Sybil Ash
- Anne Gwynne as Ruth
- Samuel S. Hinds as Horace Grover, 'the Brain'
- Shemp Howard as Okay
- Robert Emmett O'Connor as Honest John Beebe
- Richard Lane as Allan McGrath
- Sarah Padden as Mrs. Rupert

== Bibliography ==
- Fetrow, Alan G. Feature Films, 1940-1949: a United States Filmography. McFarland, 1994.
