= Soak the Rich =

1936 film by Ben Hecht

- Directed by: Ben Hecht; Charles MacArthur
- Screenplay by: Ben Hecht; Charles MacArthur
- Produced by: Ben Hecht; Charles MacArthur
- Starring: Walter Connolly; John Howard; Mary Taylor; Lionel Stander; Ilka Chase; Alice Duer Miller
- Cinematography: Leon Shamroy
- Edited by: Leo Zochling
- Production company: Paramount Pictures
- Distributed by: Paramount Pictures
- Release date: January 17, 1936
- Running time: 87 minutes
- Country: United States
- Language: English

Soak the Rich is a 1936 American comedy film written and directed by Ben Hecht and Charles MacArthur, and starring Walter Connolly, John Howard, Mary Taylor, Lionel Stander, Ilka Chase and Alice Duer Miller. It was released on January 17, 1936, by Paramount Pictures.

== Plot ==
Humphrey Craig is a tycoon who has endowed a university. His idealistic daughter Belinda enrolls there, hoping to get some idea of the "real world". When Professor Popper lectures his students on the merits of a "soak-the-rich" tax bill, Craig (who opposes the bill) gets Popper fired. Meanwhile, Joe Muglia is the leader of a band of radicals on campus. When the radicals protest the dismissal of Popper, Belinda falls in love with Buzz Jones, a radical and handsome idealist.

== Cast ==
- Walter Connolly as Humphrey Craig
- John Howard as Kenneth "Buzz" Jones
- Mary Taylor as Belinda "Bindy" Craig
- Lionel Stander as Muglia
- Ilka Chase as Mrs. Mabel Craig
- Alice Duer Miller as Miss Beasley
- Francis Compton as Tulio
- Joseph Sweeney as Capt. Pettijohn
- John W. Call as Sign carrier
- Edwin Phillips as Lockwood
- Robert Wallsten as Tommy Hutchins
- George Watts as Rockwell
- Percy Kilbride as Everett
- Isabelle Foster as Jenny
- Edward Garvey as Dean A. S. Phillpotts
- Allan Ross MacDougall as Keats
- Cornelius MacSunday as Craig's butler

== Reception ==
Frank Nugent of The New York Times wrote, "Collegiate radicals come in for a rather cruel lampooning at the hands of those old die-hards, Ben Hecht and Charles MacArthur, in the antic pair's latest picture, Soak the Rich, which moved into the Astor last night. Their spoofing of youth in revolt is frequently amusing and the quality of the dialogue proves that the premier filmmakers of Astoria have lost none of their wit. The same, alas, cannot be said of their sense of direction."

Variety criticised Hecht and MacArthur for failing to adapt their stage technique to that of a motion picture, and described this as "the chief stumbling block ... It's a simple plot which has possibilities, but it is developed along stage lines, with scenes held too long to one spot and over elaboratlon." The comments regarding the performances of the cast were lukewarm with the exception of Lionel Stander, whose performance was described as "outstanding."

Picturegoer’s Lionel Collier offered a three-star (very good) rating in his review and wrote : "When Ben Hecht and Charles MacArthur start satirising the pseudo-intellectuals and idealists you can be pretty sure that you are going to be entertained, and this picture does not belie that promise. It is a little haphazard but the dialogue is witty and subtle." Collier wrote approvingly of the cast and commented, "Walter Connolly gives a fine study … John Howard acts with sincerity as Buzz and Mary Taylor is excellent as Belinda. Lionel Stander as the eccentric revolutionary presents a brilliant piece of character work."
