= Reginald Denny (actor) =

English actor (1891–1967)

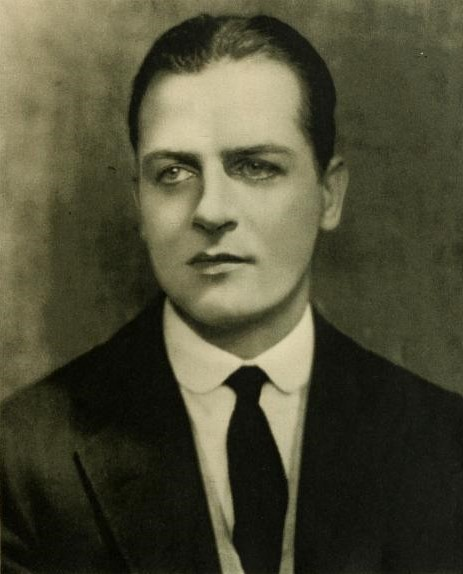
- Denny in 1924
- Born: Reginald Leigh Dugmore; 20 November 1891; Richmond, Surrey, England
- Died: 16 June 1967 (aged 75); Richmond, London, England
- Occupations: Actor, aviator, inventor
- Years active: 1915–1966
- Spouses: Irene Haisman (m. 1913; div. 1928) Isabelle "Bubbles" Stiefel (m. 1928)
- Children: 3

Signature
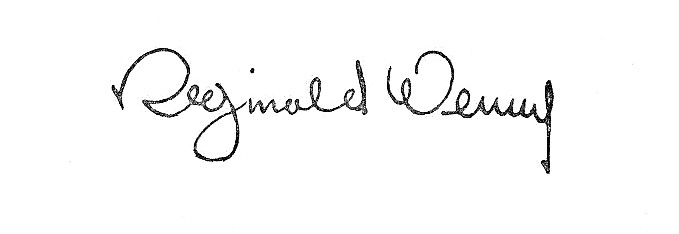

Reginald Leigh Dugmore (20 November 1891 – 16 June 1967), known professionally as Reginald Denny, was an English actor, aviator, and UAV pioneer.

== Acting career ==
Born Reginald Leigh Dugmore on 20 November 1891 in Richmond, Surrey, England (part of Greater London since 1965), he came from a theatrical family; his father was actor and opera singer W.H. Denny.

In 1899, he began his stage career in A Royal Family and starred in several London productions from age seven to twelve. He attended St. Francis Xavier College in Mayfield, Sussex, later known as Mayfield College, but, at 16, he ran away from school to train as a pugilist with Sir Harry Preston at the National Sporting Club. He also appeared in several British stage productions touring the music halls of England of The Merry Widow.

In 1911, he went to the United States to appear in Henry B. Harris's stage production of The Quaker Girl, then joined the Bandmann Opera Company as a baritone touring India and the Far East India where he performed for Krishna Raja Wadiyar IV.

Although he worked in "flickers" during 1911 and 1912, Reginald officially began his film career in 1915 with the World Film Company and made films both in the United States and Britain until the 1960s. Among the numerous stage productions in which he starred, Reginald appeared in John Barrymore's 1920 Broadway production of Richard III; the two actors became friends and starred in several films together including Sherlock Holmes (1922), Hamlet (1933), Romeo and Juliet (1936), and Paramount's Bulldog Drummond series (1937–1938).

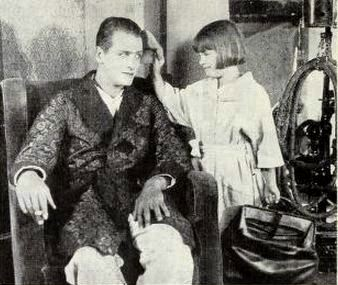
Denny and his daughter in 1922

Denny was a well-known actor in silent films, and with the advent of talkies he became a character actor. He played the lead role in a number of his earlier films, generally as a comedic Englishman in such works as Private Lives (1931) and later had reasonably steady work as a supporting actor in dozens of films, including The Little Minister (1934) with Katharine Hepburn, Anna Karenina (1935) with Greta Garbo, Alfred Hitchcock's Rebecca (1940) and the Frank Sinatra crime caper film Assault on a Queen (1966). He made frequent appearances in television during the 1950s and 1960s. His last role was in Batman (1966) as Commodore Schmidlapp. In 2020, Kino Lorber released 4K restorations on DVD and Blu-ray of three of Denny's silent comedies: The Reckless Age, Skinner's Dress Suit, and What Happened to Jones? in The Reginald Denny Collection.

== Aviation career ==
Denny, 1918

Denny served as an observer/gunner during the First World War in the new wartime Royal Air Force.

In the 1920s he performed as a stunt pilot with the 13 Black Cats aerial stunt team and loaned his World War I Sopwith Snipe biplane to Howard Hughes for use in Hell's Angels (1927). In the early 1930s, Denny became interested in free-flight model airplanes. In 1934, he and oil tycoon Max Whittier's son, Paul Whittier, formed Reginald Denny Industries and opened a model plane shop, which became a chain known as the Reginald Denny Hobby Shop, now California Hobby Distributors.

He designed his "Dennyplane" with its signature model engine "Dennymite" developed by engineer Walter Righter, in addition to the "Denny Jr." which child actors would enter in model plane competitions at Mines Field, which later became Los Angeles International Airport.

Denny had a great deal in common with Robert Loraine, an older actor/airman. They had been in a West End production together in 1902 in London, they were both veterans of the RFC (and its successor, the Royal Air Force) and were both flying and making films in Hollywood in the 1930s. Each of them visited their close relatives in the same area of London. At Loraine's wedding in 1921, his best man was an Air-Commodore who had been in charge of the RFC radio control weapons and developed the first powered drone aircraft. Denny became interested in radio controlled aircraft and started the first US military drone work at the start of WWII.

In 1935, Denny began developing his remote controlled "radioplane" for military use. In 1939, he and his partners won the first military United States Army Air Corps contract for their radio-controlled target drone, the Radioplane OQ-2. In July 1940, they formed the Radioplane Company and manufactured nearly fifteen thousand drones for the U.S. Army during the Second World War. It was here that he employed a teenage girl by the name of Norma Jeane Mortensen (later known as Marilyn Monroe) who is recorded as having said it was "the hardest work I ever had to do". The company was purchased by Northrop in 1952.

Reginald Denny's Hobby Shop, began selling his models, in 1935, on Hollywood Boulevard.

== Personal life ==
Denny married actress Irene Hilda Haismann on 28 January 1913 in Calcutta; both were with the Bandmann Opera Company. They had one daughter but were divorced in 1928. Denny married actress Isabelle "Bubbles" Stiefel in 1928 and they had two children.

== Death ==
Denny died on 16 June 1967, aged 75, after suffering a stroke whilst visiting his sister in his home town of Richmond, England. He was interred at Forest Lawn-Hollywood Hills Cemetery in Los Angeles, California. His three children and wife Isabelle (died 1996, aged 89) survived him.

== Partial filmography ==
=== Silent ===
- Niobe (1915) as Cornelius Griffin
- The Melting Pot (1915) in an undetermined role (uncredited)
- The Red Lantern (1919)
- Bringing Up Betty (1919) as Tom Waring
- The Oakdale Affair (1919) as Arthur Stockbridge
- A Dark Lantern (1920) as Prince Anton
- 39 East (1920) as Napoleon Gibbs Jr.
- Paying the Piper (1921) as Keith Larne
- The Price of Possession (1921) as Robert Dawnay
- Experience (1921)
- Disraeli (1921) as Charles, Viscount Deeford
- Footlights (1921) as Brett Page
- The Beggar Maid (1921 short) as the Earl of Winston / King Cophetua
- Tropical Love (1921) as the Drifter
- The Iron Trail (1921) as Dan Appleton
- Let's Go (1922 short) as Kane Halliday / "Kid" Roberts
- Round Two (1922 short) as Kane 'Kid Roberts' Halliday
- Sherlock Holmes (1922) as Prince Alexis
- Payment Through the Nose (1922 short) as Kane Halliday / Kid Roberts
- The Leather Pushers (1922) as Kane Halliday / Kid Roberts
- A Fool and His Money (1922 short) as Kane Halliday / Kid Roberts
- The Taming of the Shrewd (1922 short) as Kane Halliday / Kid Roberts
- Whipsawed (1922 short) as Kane Halliday / Kid Roberts
- Never Let Go (1922 short) as Campbell - the Mountie
- The Jaws of Steel (1922 short) as Cpl. Haldene, N.W.M.P.
- Plain Grit (1922 short)
- The Kentucky Derby (1922) as Donald Gordon
- Young King Cole (1922 short) as Kane Halliday / Kid Roberts
- He Raised Kane (1922) as Kane Halliday / Kid Roberts
- The Chickasha Bone Crusher (1923 short) as Kane Halliday / Kid Roberts
- When Kane Met Abel (1923 short) as Kane Halliday / Kid Roberts
- Strike Father, Strike Son (1923 short) as Kane Halliday / Kid Roberts
- Joan of Newark (1923 short) as Kane Halliday / Kid Roberts
- The Abysmal Brute (1923) as Pat Glendon, Jr
- The Wandering Two (1923 short) as Kane Halliday / Kid Roberts
- The Widower's Mite (1923 short) as Kane Halliday / Kid Roberts
- Don Coyote (1923 short) as Kane Halliday / Kid Roberts
- Something for Nothing (1923 short) as Kane Halliday / Kid Roberts
- Columbia, the Gem, and the Ocean (1923 short) as Kane Halliday / Kid Roberts
- Barnaby's Grudge (1923 short) as Kane Halliday / Kid Roberts
- The Thrill Chaser (1924) in a cameo appearance
- Sporting Youth (1924) as Jimmy Wood
- The Reckless Age (1924) as Dick Minot
- The Fast Worker (1924) as Terry Brock
- Oh Doctor! (1925) as Rufus Billings Jr.
- I'll Show You the Town (1925) as Alec Dupree
- Where Was I? (1925) as Thomas S. Berford
- California Straight Ahead (1925) as Tom Hayden
- What Happened to Jones (1926) as Tom Jones
- Skinner's Dress Suit (1926) as Skinner
- Rolling Home (1926) as Nat Alden
- Take It from Me (1926) as Tom Eggett
- The Cheerful Fraud (1926) as Sir Michael Fairlie
- Fast and Furious (1927) as Tom Brown
- Out All Night (1927) as John Graham
- On Your Toes (1927) as Elliott Beresford
- That's My Daddy (1927) as James "Jimmy" Norton
- Good Morning, Judge (1928) as Freddie Grey
- The Night Bird (1928) as Kid Davis (his last silent film)

=== Sound ===
- Red Hot Speed (1929) as Darrow
- Clear the Decks (1929) as Jack Armitage
- His Lucky Day (1929) as Charles Blaydon
- One Hysterical Night (1929) as William "Napoleon" Judd
- Embarrassing Moments (1930) as Thaddeus Cruikshank
- What a Man! (1930) as Wade Rawlins
- Madam Satan (1930) as Bob Brooks
- Those Three French Girls (1930) as Larry
- A Lady's Morals (1930) as Paul Brandt
- Oh, for a Man! (1930) as Barney McGann
- Parlor, Bedroom and Bath (1931) as Jeffrey Haywood
- Kiki (1931) as Victor Randall
- Stepping Out (1931) as Tom Martin
- Private Lives (1931) as Victor
- Strange Justice (1932) as Judson
- The Iron Master (1933) as Steve Mason
- The Barbarian (1933) as Gerald Hume - Diana's Fiancée
- The Big Bluff (1933)
- Only Yesterday (1933) as Bob
- Fog (1933) as Dr. Winstay
- The Lost Patrol (1934) as Brown
- Dancing Man (1934) as Paul Drexel
- The World Moves On (1934) as Erik von Gerhardt
- Of Human Bondage (1934) as Harry Griffiths
- We're Rich Again (1934) as Bookington "Bookie" Wells
- One More River (1934) as David Dornford
- The Richest Girl in the World (1934) as Phillip Lockwood
- The Little Minister (1934) as Captain Halliwell
- Lottery Lover (1935) as Capt. Payne
- Without Children (1935) as Phil Graham
- Vagabond Lady (1935) as John "Johnny" Spear
- No More Ladies (1935) as Oliver
- Here's to Romance (1935) as Emery Gerard
- Anna Karenina (1935) as Yashvin
- The Lady in Scarlet (1935) as Oliver Keith
- Remember Last Night? (1935) as Jake Whitridge
- Midnight Phantom (1935) as Prof. David Graham
- The Preview Murder Mystery (1936) as Johnny Morgan
- It Couldn't Have Happened - But It Did (1936) as Greg Stone
- Romeo and Juliet (1936) as Benvolio - Nephew to Montgue and Friend to Romeo
- Two in a Crowd (1936) as James Stewart Anthony
- More Than a Secretary (1936) as Bill Houston
- We're in the Legion Now! (1936) as Dan Linton
- Bulldog Drummond Escapes (1937) as Algy Longworth
- Join the Marines (1937) as Steve Lodge
- Women of Glamour (1937) as Fritz "Frederick" Eagan
- Let's Get Married (1937) as George Willoughby
- The Great Gambini (1937) as William Randall
- Jungle Menace (1937, Serial) as Ralph Marshall [Chs.1-3]
- Bulldog Drummond Comes Back (1937) as Algy Longworth
- Beg, Borrow or Steal (1937) as Clifton Summitt
- Bulldog Drummond's Revenge (1937) as Algy Longworth
- Bulldog Drummond's Peril (1938) as Algy Longworth
- Four Men and a Prayer (1938) as Capt. Douglas Loveland
- Blockade (1938) as Edward Grant
- Bulldog Drummond in Africa (1938) as Algy Longworth
- Arrest Bulldog Drummond (1938) as Algy Longworth
- Bulldog Drummond's Secret Police (1939) as Algy Longworth
- Everybody's Baby (1939) as Dr. Pilcoff
- Bulldog Drummond's Bride (1939) as Algy Longworth
- Rebecca (1940) as Frank Crawley
- Spring Parade (1940) as the Major
- Seven Sinners (1940) as Captain Church
- One Night in Lisbon (1941) as Erich Strasser
- International Squadron (1941) as Wing Commander Severn
- Appointment for Love (1941) as Michael Dailey
- Captains of the Clouds (1942) as Commanding Officer
- Sherlock Holmes and the Voice of Terror (1942) as Sir Evan Barham
- Eyes in the Night (1942) as Stephen Lawry
- Thunder Birds (1942) as Barrett
- Over My Dead Body (1942) as Richard "Dick" Brenner
- The Crime Doctor's Strangest Case (1943) as Paul Ashley
- Song of the Open Road (1944) as Director Curtis
- Love Letters (1945) as Defense Counsel Phillips
- Tangier (1946) as Fernandez
- The Locket (1946) as Mr. Wendell
- My Favorite Brunette (1947) as James Collins
- The Macomber Affair (1947) as Police Inspector
- The Secret Life of Walter Mitty (1947) as Colonel
- Christmas Eve (1947) as Phillip Hastings
- Escape Me Never (1947) as Mr. MacLean
- Mr. Blandings Builds His Dream House (1948) as Simms
- The Iroquois Trail (1950) as Capt. Edward Brownell
- Fort Vengeance (1953) as Inspector Trevett
- Abbott and Costello Meet Dr. Jekyll and Mr. Hyde (1953) as Inspector
- World for Ransom (1954) as Maj. Ian Bone
- Sabaka (1954) as Sir Cedric
- Escape to Burma (1955) as Commissioner
- The Donald O'Connor Show (NBC) (1955) as Himself
- G.E. Summer Originals (ABC) (1956), episode "Alias Mike Hercules"
- Around the World in 80 Days (1956) as Bombay Police Inspector
- Cat Ballou (1965) as Sir Harry Percival
- Batman Series TV (1966, episodes 11 and 12) as King Boris
- Assault on a Queen (1966) as Master-at-Arms
- Batman (1966) as Commodore Schmidlapp (final acting role)
