= Adventures of the Sea Hawk =

- Also known as: Caribbean Adventure
- Genre: Adventure
- Starring: John Howard
- Country of origin: United States
- Original language: English
- No. of seasons: 1
- No. of episodes: 26

Production
- Producers: Eugene Solow; Brewster Morgan
- Production location: Bermuda
- Production company: Wesmore Productions

Adventures of the Sea Hawk is a 1961 syndicated television series starring John Howard.

== Background ==
Episodes were filmed in 1958 with the title Caribbean Adventure, but the content "was too low-key and leisurely to foster sales in that violence-prone TV year." The title was changed, and Adventures of the Sea Hawk was released in 1961, amid "the public hue and cry over television mayhem". Even then, however, sales were limited.

An unsold pilot for a different Adventures of the Sea Hawk series was made in 1956. George O'Brien starred as the ship's captain. That pilot was broadcast as one episode of Studio 57.

== Plot ==
The series presents the travels of the floating electronics lab Sea Hawk as the schooner undertakes research projects in the Caribbean. The ship is piloted by Commander John Hawk. Hawk was based in Bermuda, but his research took him to other areas of the sea. Episodes related how he used his scientific resources to help people whom he met in his travels.

== Production ==
Brewster Morgan and Eugene Solow produced the series in association with MCA. TV Marketeers distributed the program.

== Cast and characters ==
- John Howard as John Hawk
- John Lee as Hawk's assistant
- Michael Brennan as Reilly
- Mary Holland as Jonesy
- Hatton Duprez as Kivi
