= That Navy Spirit =

1937 film by Kurt Neumann

- Directed by: Kurt Neumann
- Written by: Erwin S. Gelsey; Lloyd Corrigan; Albert S. Le Vino
- Produced by: Charles R. Rogers; William LeBaron; Edward T. Lowe Jr.
- Starring: Lew Ayres; Mary Carlisle; John Howard
- Cinematography: Henry Sharp
- Edited by: Edward Dmytryk
- Music by: Charles Kisco
- Production company: Paramount Pictures
- Distributed by: Paramount Pictures
- Release date: November 5, 1937
- Running time: 64 minutes
- Country: United States
- Language: English

That Navy Spirit is a 1937 American sports film directed by Kurt Neumann and starring Lew Ayres, Mary Carlisle and John Howard. It is also known by the alternative title Hold 'Em Navy. It follows two members of the American football team at the United States Naval Academy in Annapolis who compete over the same girl before the varsity game against West Point.

== Plot ==
As first-year "plebes" at the Naval Academy, newcomers Tommy and Stuffy are subjected to rude treatment by the upperclassmen. After one of them, Chuck Baldwin, gives him a hard time, Tommy decides to invite Chuck's sweetheart Judy to a school ball.

Tommy is also a talented football quarterback, but because Chuck informs on him being out after curfew, Tommy is suspended from the team and Navy loses the game. Judy is upset with Tommy, but a year later, when the situation is reversed and Chuck is caught out after dark, Tommy vouches for him. Chuck plays and helps Navy defeat Army in the big game, then dedicates the victory to Tommy.

== Main cast ==
- Lew Ayres as Tommy Graham
- Mary Carlisle as Judy Holland
- John Howard as Chuck Baldwin
- Elizabeth Patterson as Grandma Holland
- Benny Baker as Stuffy Miller
- Archie Twitchell as Jerry Abbott
- Tully Marshall as The 'Admiral'
- Billy Daniel as Midshipman Steve Crenshaw
- Richard Denning as Midshipman Jepson
- John Hubbard as Midshipman Hopkins
- Lee Bennett as Midshipman Blake

Alan Ladd has a small role.

== See also ==
- List of American football films

== Bibliography ==
- Quinlan, David. The Film Lover's Companion: An A to Z Guide to 2,000 Stars and the Movies They Made. Carol Publishing Group, 1997.
