= 13 Hours by Air =

1936 film by Mitchell Leisen

- Theatrical poster
- Directed by: Mitchell Leisen
- Written by: Kenyon Nicholson; Bogart Rogers
- Based on: Wild Wings by Bogart Rogers, Frank Mitchell Dazey
- Produced by: E. Lloyd Sheldon
- Starring: Fred MacMurray; Joan Bennett
- Cinematography: Theodor Sparkuhl
- Edited by: Doane Harrison
- Music by: Heinz Roemheld (composer); Irvin Talbot (conductor)
- Production company: Paramount Pictures
- Distributed by: Paramount Pictures
- Release date: April 30, 1936
- Running time: 77 minutes
- Country: United States
- Language: English

13 Hours by Air (also known as 20 Hours by Air) is a 1936 American drama film made by Paramount Pictures and directed by Mitchell Leisen. The film stars Fred MacMurray and Joan Bennett. The screenplay was written by Kenyon Nicholson and Bogart Rogers, based on story Wild Wings by Rogers and Frank Mitchell Dazey. 13 Hours by Air was also the forerunner of the disaster film, a genre featuring a complex, heavily character-driven ensemble cast, exploring the personal dramas and interactions that develop among the passengers and crew as they deal with a deadly onboard emergency.

== Plot ==
Airline pilot Jack Gordon (Fred MacMurray) on a flight from New York to San Francisco, is immediately attracted to beautiful passenger Felice Rollins (Joan Bennett). Known as a "lady's man", he bets stewardess Vi Johnson (Ruth Donnelly) that he will take Felice out to dinner that evening. A jewel robbery is in the news and a beautiful blonde is implicated, with Jack suspecting that Felice may be the culprit. On a stop over in Chicago, Jack learns instead that his passenger is a wealthy socialite at odds with another passenger, Count Stephani (Fred Keating). Jack worries that he may have a crisis involving the Count when he finds Stephani has a gun aboard. Other passengers include Dr. Evarts (Brian Donlevy) and Curtis Palmer (Alan Baxter), both of whom seem to be harboring a secret.

Felice is trying to get to San Francisco in order to prevent her sister from marrying the Count's brother, but the flight runs into bad weather. Jack and Freddie Scott (John Howard), his co-pilot, are persuaded to fly on, but are eventually forced to make an emergency landing. Dr. Evarts tells Jack he is a federal agent pursuing Palmer, a notorious criminal. Palmer shoots Freddie and Dr. Everts and hijacks the aircraft. Jack manages to overcome Palmer, and with the help of Felice, is able to take off and fly to San Francisco. When the flight lands, he is able to have his dinner with Felice, collecting his bet, knowing that he will need the money for a marriage license.

== Cast ==
- Fred MacMurray as Jack Gordon
- Joan Bennett as Felice Rollins
- ZaSu Pitts as Miss Harkins
- John Howard as Freddie Scott
- Benny Bartlett as Waldemar Pitt III (as Bennie Bartlett)
- Grace Bradley as Trixie La Brey
- Alan Baxter as Curtis Palmer
- Brian Donlevy as Dr. Evarts
- Ruth Donnelly as Vi Johnson
- Fred Keating as Count Gregore Stephani
- Adrienne Marden as Ann McKenna
- Dean Jagger as Hap Waller
- Mildred Stone as Ruth Bradford
- Jack Mulhall as Horace Lander
- Clyde Dilson as Fat Richhauser
- Dennis O'Keefe as Baker (as Bud Flannagan)
- Granville Bates as Pop Andrews
- Bruce Warren as Tex Doyle
- Marie Prevost as Waitress in Omaha

== Production ==
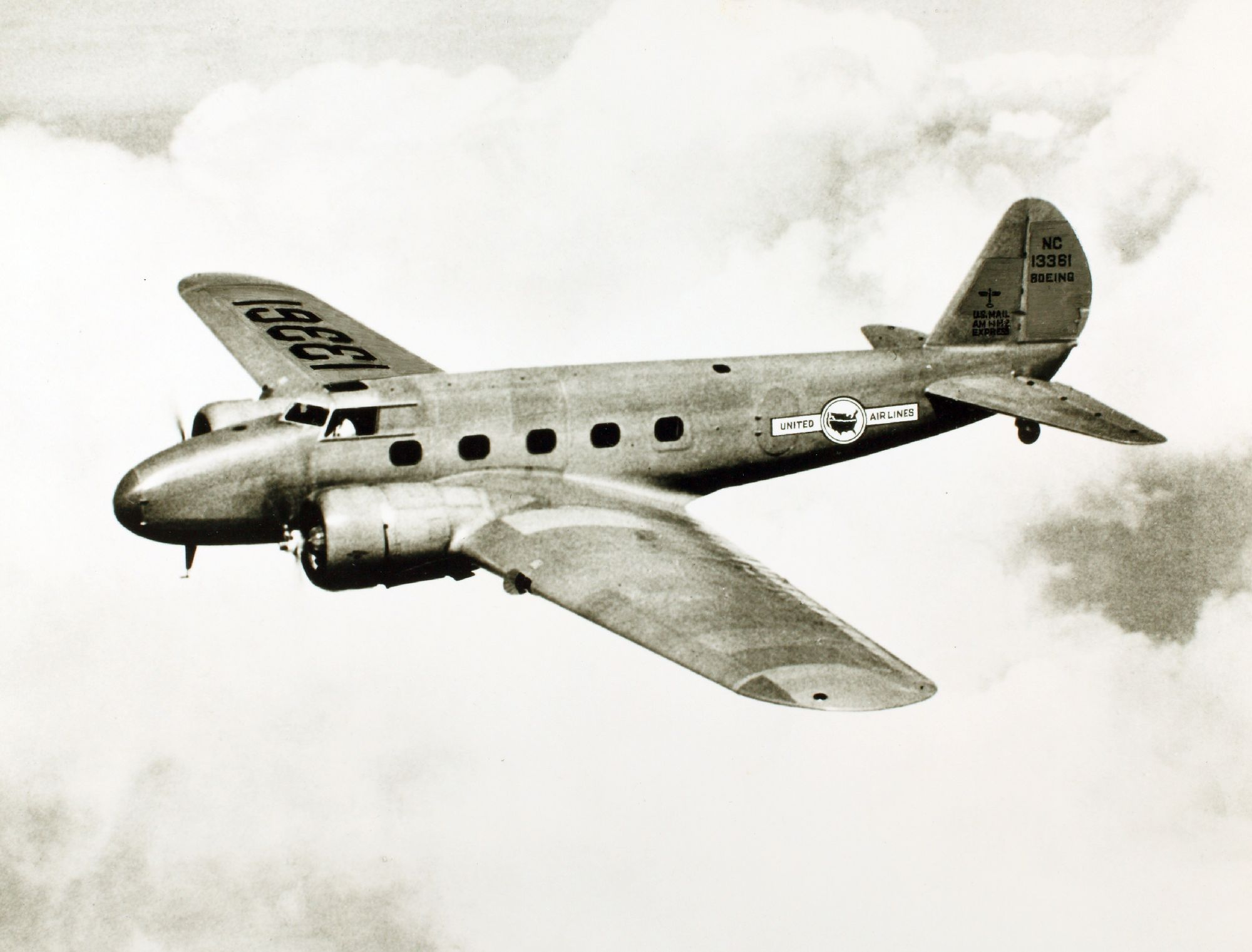
A Boeing 247 airliner was prominently featured in 13 Hours by Air.

Created under the working title 20 Hours by Air, the pace set in 1933 for transcontinental passenger flights, the production updated its name to match the recent exploits of Wiley Post, Jimmy Doolittle, and Roscoe Turner. The picture was filmed at the Alhambra Airport, California, in Cleveland, Ohio, and Beaver Dam, Wisconsin, using United Air Lines Boeing 247 airliners. Second unit filming involved a flight from Newark to Los Angeles to obtain footage to be used in the film. An aircraft assigned to the production was involved in a minor accident.

The pairing of MacMurray and Bennett brought together two dependable leads who worked as Paramount Studios contract players. They were sometimes loaned out to other concerns, and steadily advanced from films like 13 Hours by Air to more prestigious fare.

== Reception ==
Film reviewer Frank S. Nugent, in his review for The New York Times, called 13 Hours by Air "pleasant". "... there is no disputing the liveliness of the melodrama. The device of tossing a miscellany of humans and motives together on a bus, plane, train or airliner and letting them work out their destiny is as formular [sic] as the Bartender's Guide and has been used as often, but Bogart Rogers's and Frank Mitchell Dazey's story has been screened with a shrewd sense of pace, with a purposeful preservation of suspense and a knack for comic interlude."
