= Bulldog Drummond's Secret Police =

1939 film by James P. Hogan

- Directed by: James P. Hogan
- Screenplay by: Garnett Weston
- Based on: Temple Tower; 1929 novel by H. C. McNeile
- Produced by: Stuart Walker
- Starring: John Howard; Leo G. Carroll; Heather Angel; E. E. Clive; Reginald Denny; Forrester Harvey
- Cinematography: Merritt B. Gerstad
- Edited by: Arthur P. Schmidt
- Music by: Boris Morros
- Production company: Paramount Pictures
- Distributed by: Paramount Pictures
- Release date: April 14, 1939
- Running time: 56 minutes
- Country: United States
- Language: English

Bulldog Drummond's Secret Police is a 1939 murder mystery film directed by James P. Hogan, based on the H. C. McNeile novel Temple Tower. It is one of many films featuring the British sleuth and adventurer Bulldog Drummond. In 1930, Fox produced Temple Tower, directed by Donald Gallaher and starring Kenneth MacKenna and Marceline Day, which was also based on the McNeile book.

The story is set 28 miles outside London in Rockingham, as a sign on the railroad station states.

== Plot ==
An absent-minded Professor Downie (Forrester Harvey) makes a call upon Capt. Hugh "Bulldog" Drummond (John Howard) as he is making plans for his much-delayed wedding to fiancée Phyllis Claverling (Heather Angel) in his ancestral home Temple Tower.

The professor informs Drummond that a fortune was buried in one of the walled off storerooms underneath his estate, and that Downie was in possession of a book written in code that would lead them to discover the treasure. Unfortunately for the professor, someone else also wanted the riches and Drummond once again is dragged into the plot as the code book is stolen, Professor Downie is murdered, and Phyllis is kidnapped.

== Cast ==
- Heather Angel as Phyllis Clavering
- John Howard as Captain Hugh C. "Bulldog" Drummond
- H.B. Warner as Colonel Nielson
- Reginald Denny as Algy Longworth
- E.E. Clive as Tenny
- Elizabeth Patterson as Aunt Blanche
- Leo G. Carroll as Henry Seaton/Andrew Boulton
- Forrester Harvey as Professor Downie
- Clyde Cook as Constable Hawkins
- David Clyde as Constable Jenkins
- Neil Fitzgerald as Station Master
- Elspeth Dudgeon as Housekeeper
- Louise Campbell as Woman in Drummond's Dream (uncredited)

== Notes ==
The film uses flashbacks from previous Drummond films and dream sequences extensively, which has led some to criticize it as tiresome. Oddly, despite the phrase "secret police" in the title, there is nothing relating to any secret police in the plot except Col. Neilsen's quip when several of the characters are together. The production values are high as the sets are of high quality, but the script has not received much acclaim.
