= Arrest Bulldog Drummond =

1939 film by James P. Hogan

- Directed by: James P. Hogan
- Screenplay by: Stuart Palmer (writer)
- Based on: The Final Count; 1926 novel by Herman C. McNeile
- Produced by: William LeBaron (executive producer); Stuart Walker (producer)
- Starring: John Howard; Heather Angel; H. B. Warner
- Cinematography: Ted Tetzlaff
- Edited by: Stuart Gilmore
- Music by: Gerard Carbonara
- Production company: Paramount Pictures
- Distributed by: Paramount Pictures
- Release dates: November 25, 1938 (US); November 29, 1938 (London)
- Running time: 57 minutes
- Country: United States
- Language: English

Arrest Bulldog Drummond is a 1938 American crime thriller film directed by James P. Hogan. It was the sixth of eight B-pictures featuring the character produced by Paramount Pictures in the late 1930s. All but the first starred John Howard as Drummond.

== Plot ==
Bulldog Drummond and Algy Longworth are in the midst of preparations for Bulldog's wedding in London, to his fiancé, Phyllis. They are summoned to the house of Richard Gannett, an eccentric scientist, who has invented a prototype electric "death-ray" device which has the potential to revolutionize warfare. Upon arriving, they find Gannett, an apparent victim of murder, who says “Look out for The Stinger!” before dying. Bulldog and Algy report the murder and theft of the death ray to Scotland Yard, but a dock-yard knife-fight makes Bulldog a prime suspect. Bulldog is released for lack of evidence and visits the local botanical gardens where he discovers a loaned stingray is missing. “The Stinger” sends Bulldog a threatening note to stop his investigation. Drummond concludes the death ray machine is near areas reporting flickering lights. He and his pals, Algy and Tenny, are framed when they are found near the machine's targets which can be as far as a quarter mile away. Bulldog's pursuit leads him to board a cruise ship where he sees Phyllis leaving (believing Bulldog jilted her); and, he also sees The Stinger, who is a spy named Rolf Alferson. Bulldog returns to Scotland Yard to report. Phyllis becomes suspicious of Alferson after she receives a fake letter from Bulldog actually written by Alferson. Bulldog and Phyllis are reconciled and unite to stop Alferson. Algy and Tenny are captured trying to foil Alferson's attempt to sell the machine to a foreign power. Bulldog intervenes just as the deal goes down and a fight ensues. The authorities arrive arresting Alferson and his gang.

== Cast ==
- John Howard as Capt. Hugh Chesterton "Bulldog" Drummond
- Heather Angel as Phyllis Clavering
- H.B. Warner as Col. J.A. Nielson
- Reginald Denny as Algernon "Algy" Longworth
- E.E. Clive as "Tenny" Tennison
- Jean Fenwick as Lady Beryl Ledyard
- Zeffie Tilbury as Aunt Meg
- George Zucco as Rolf Alferson
- Leonard Mudie as Richard Gannett
- Evan Thomas as John Smith
- Clyde Cook as Short, Mustachio'd Constable (Sacker)
- David Clyde as Tall, Cleanshaven Constable (McThane)
- George Regas as Soongh, Lady Beryl's man
- Neil Fitzgerald as Sir Malcolm McLeonard
- Claud Allister as Sir Basil Leghorne
- Forrester Harvey as Constable Severn
- John Sutton as Inspector Tredennis
