= The Man from Dakota =

1940 film

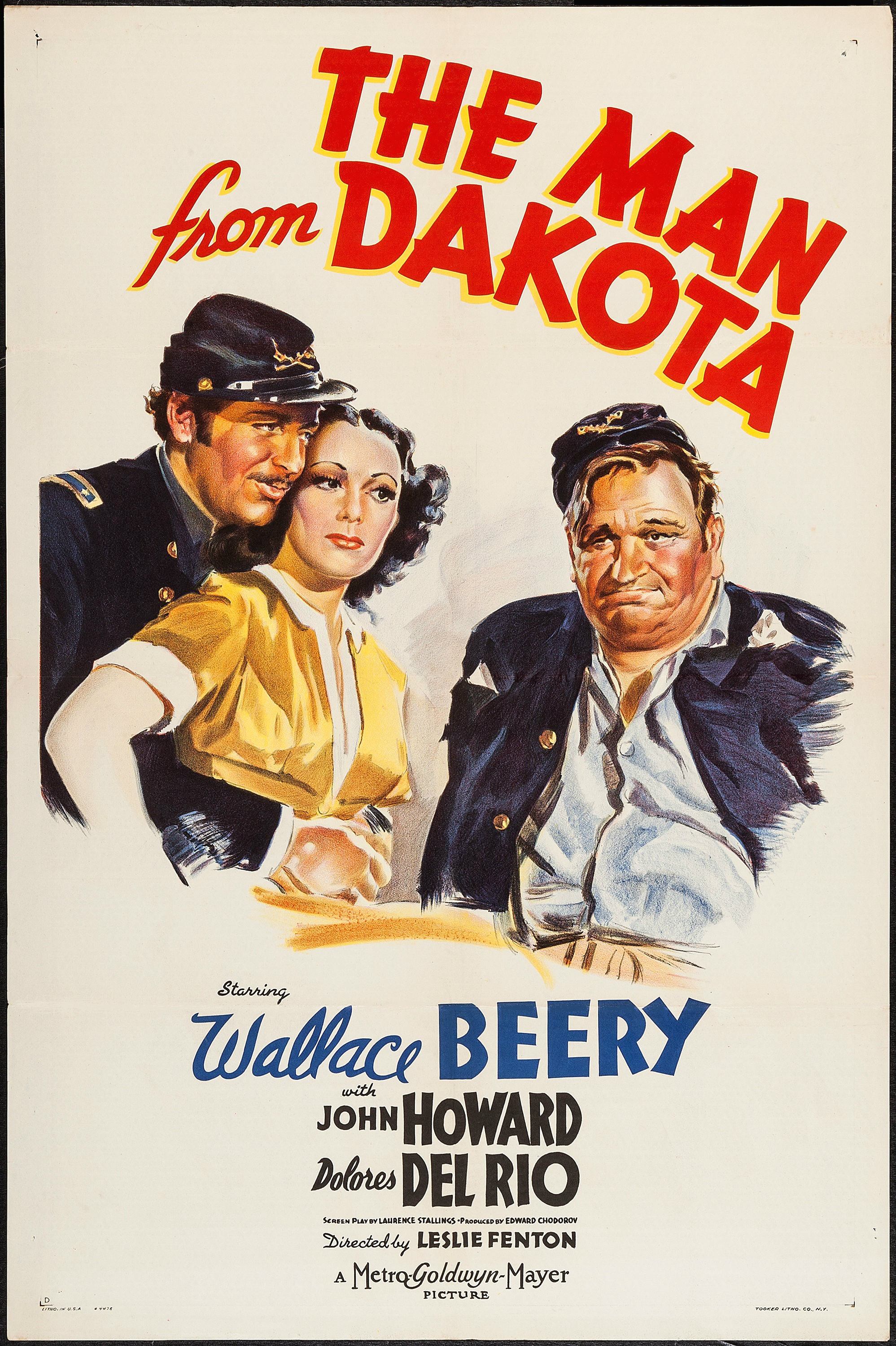
- Original theatrical poster
- Directed by: Leslie Fenton
- Written by: MacKinlay Kantor (novel); Laurence Stallings
- Produced by: Edward Chodorov
- Starring: Wallace Beery; John Howard; Dolores del Río
- Cinematography: Ray June
- Edited by: Conrad A. Nervig
- Music by: Daniele Amfitheatrof; David Snell et.al.
- Production company: Metro-Goldwyn-Mayer
- Distributed by: Loew's, Inc.
- Release date: 1940
- Running time: 75 minutes
- Country: United States
- Language: English

The Man from Dakota is a 1940 American Civil War film directed by Leslie Fenton and starring Wallace Beery and Dolores del Río. The film was adapted by Laurence Stallings from the novel Arouse and Beware by MacKinlay Kantor.

Francis Ford makes an unbilled appearance as a horseman on a bridge and Buddy Roosevelt also appears in an uncredited role, usually referred to as "Officer #1."

== Plot ==
During the American Civil War, Sergeant Bar Barstow and Lieutenant Oliver Clark, soldiers in the Union Army, are prisoners of war at the Confederate Belle Island Prison outside Richmond, Virginia. Barstow is a hard-boiled scout from the Dakota Territory while Clark is an idealist from Boston, Massachusetts.

Clark hatches an escape plan. The two men got themselves assigned to care for a group of soldiers infected with smallpox at a field hospital outside the prison. While being transported there, Barstow and Clark escape their guards. While in hiding, they see a young girl kill a Confederate officer. They find out that her name is Jenny and that she is Russian. She killed the officer because he betrayed her. On the dead officer's body, the two soldiers find a map written in Russian. With Jenny translating, they find out that it is a map detailing the positions of the Confederate Army for a massive ambush against the Union Army.

Clark and Oliver decided to deliver the map to Union General Ulysses S. Grant to thwart the attack. While heading to the Union front lines, they encounter a farmhouse with a murdered man inside. A posse of townspeople capture the trio, thinking them the murderers. However, Clark, Barstow and Jenny soon prove their innocence.

Back on the road, the group find themselves trapped by Confederate soldiers. Splitting up, they first hide in a farm owned by a Union sympathizer, then in the woods. They can now see Grant and his army moving towards a Confederate trap. Clark fails in an attempt to steal a horse to warn them. Barstow, motivated by a desire to collect his back pay, takes the map and rides through a hail of Confederate gunfire to the Union troops, saving the day.

== Cast ==
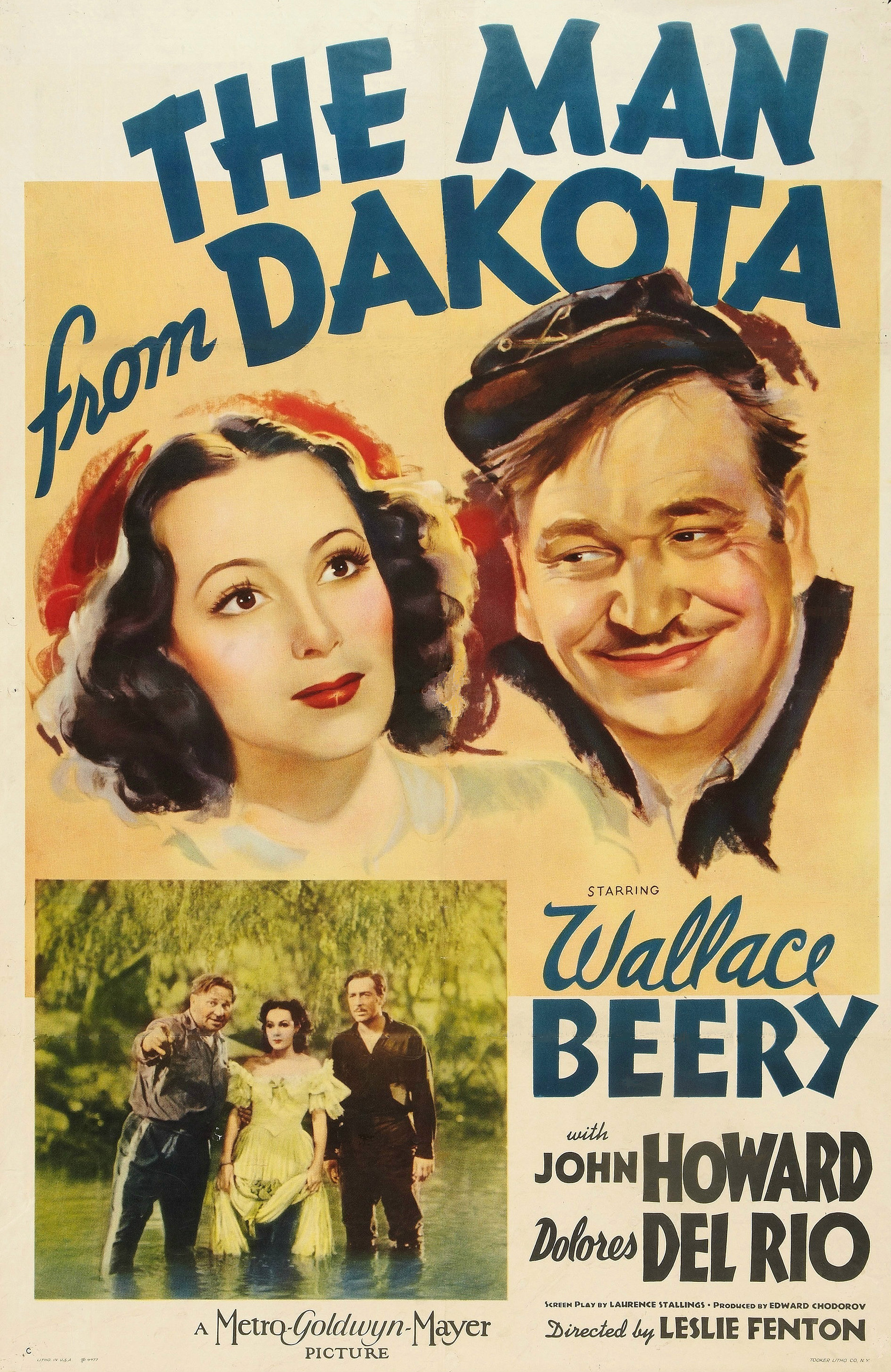
1940 poster

- Wallace Beery as Bar Barstow
- John Howard as Oliver Clark
- Dolores del Río as Jenny Sanford
- Donald Meek as Mr. Vestry
- Robert Barrat as Parson Summers
- Addison Richards as Confederate Provost Marshal

== Production ==
The Man from Dakota was filmed in Sherwood Lake, California in the backcountry of Ventura County.

== See also ==
- List of films and television shows about the American Civil War
