= Hitting a New High =

1937 film by Raoul Walsh

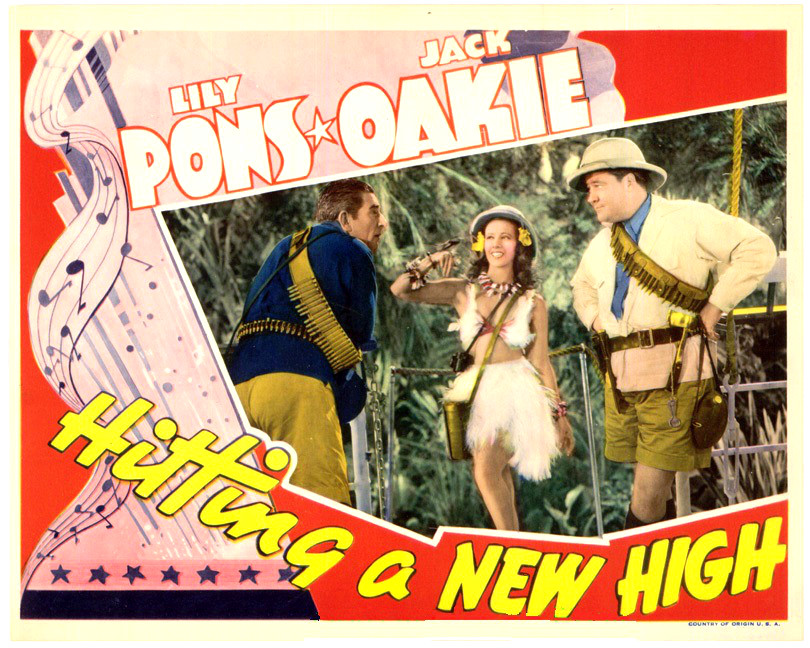
- Lobby card
- Directed by: Raoul Walsh
- Written by: Robert Harari; Maxwell Shane
- Screenplay by: Gertrude Purcell; John Twist
- Produced by: Jesse L. Lasky
- Starring: Lily Pons; Jack Oakie; John Howard
- Cinematography: J. Roy Hunt
- Edited by: Desmond Marquette
- Music by: Score: Nathaniel Shilkret; Songs: Jimmy McHugh (music); Harold Adamson (lyrics)
- Production company: RKO Radio Pictures
- Distributed by: RKO Radio Pictures
- Release date: December 24, 1937
- Running time: 85 minutes
- Country: United States
- Language: English
- Budget: $727,000
- Box office: $488,000

Hitting a New High is a 1937 American musical comedy film directed by Raoul Walsh. It stars Lily Pons and Jack Oakie. It was nominated for an Academy Award in 1938 in the category Best Sound Recording (John O. Aalberg).

== Plot ==
Corny Davis, a press agent of an American entertainment mogul based out of Paris, France is looking for a new work. After the mogul, Lucius B Blynn, faces a series of embrassments, his press agent tries to sign an opera singer for him. He finds an opera singer named Suzette (Lily Pons), Suzette is furious with her current agent and boyfriend (Jimmy James, played by John Howard) who wants her to sing cabaret instead of opera, so she walks out on him, where Corny is waiting. However, Davis's boss is already on a quest to rebuild his reputation by going on safari in French Equatorial Africa. Therefore, he has the opera singer (played by Lily Pons) go to the French Congo and pretend to be a "bird woman", something akin to Tarzan but having been raised amongst the birds. He "finds" her in the wild singing, just as Corny intended. Despite the farcical nature of this, Blynn buys it. He has her "captured" in a wooden cage, Corny says he'll "teach her" to speak, absurdly Blynn continues to fall for the entire charade. While Blynn frantically telegrams New York telling them about his "find", Corny and Suzette (who is pretending to be "Oogahunga the Bird-Girl") scheme to keep the farce going until she's famous and he's rich. Blynn excitedly debuts Suzette on radio in New York City while he wears full safari gear despite being on radio. When questioned on why he's dressed that way he says it's so he can have "an authentic mental juxtaposition". However, during her inaugural broadcast her ex-boss/ex-boyfriend hears her singing the song she was arguing with him about when she walked out on him. Immediately he knows it's her. Shortly thereafter Jimmy James shows up in Blynn's office. Blynn kicks him out but he scales the wall and finds Suzette upstairs playing piano and singing. Corny walks in on them and makes an arrangement with Jimmy, they get Suzette to agree to do shows for both of them in exchange for James not exposing their scheme. His friend and clarinet player Cedric Cosmos (played by Eric Blore) overhears Corny, Jimmy and Suzette discussing the entire scam backstage during one such cabaret show. He asks Jimmy for hush money and when he doesn't get it he shows up the next day as adventurer "Captain Braceridge Hemingway", explorer of Africa. Blynn, unaware he's being tricked yet again falls for Cedric's imitation. Cedric, as "Captain Braceridge Hemingway" tells an elaborate tale of shipwreck off of the coast Africa. He claims to be the long lost father of "Oogahunga, the Bird-Girl". Blynn gracefully allows him to reconnect with his "long lost daughter". When Cedric and Corny are alone, Cedric makes blackmail demands of Corny. However, during the next performance of "Oogahunga", she is recognized as Suzette by Blynn's main rival. Said rival confronts Corny and he too gets cut in on the blackmail money. Blynn goes to the nightclub where Suzette also sings cabaret. He sees Suzette there singing and "Captain Braceridge Hemingway" playing clarinet in Jimmy's band, and Blynn demands she stop singing, still believing she's "Oogahunga". Everything is exposed and explained to Blynn who erupts in fury. Cedric plays on the clarinet as Blynn storms away and the rest of the band joins in. Then Corny and Blynn begin drunkenly singing along, and then Suzette joins in as well. Then the entire audience joins in as well.

== Cast ==
- Lily Pons as Suzette, aka Oogahunga, the Bird-Girl
- Jack Oakie as Corny Davis
- John Howard as Jimmy James
- Eric Blore as Cedric Cosmo, aka Captain Braceridge Hemingway
- Edward Everett Horton as Lucius B Blynn

== Reception ==
The film lost a reported $431,000.
