= Grand Jury Secrets =

1939 film by James P. Hogan

- Directed by: James P. Hogan
- Screenplay by: Irving Reis; Maxwell Shane; Robert Yost
- Produced by: Samuel G. Engel
- Starring: John Howard; Gail Patrick; William Frawley; Jane Darwell; Porter Hall; Harvey Stephens
- Cinematography: Harry Fischbeck
- Edited by: Hugh Bennett
- Music by: Victor Young
- Production company: Paramount Pictures
- Distributed by: Paramount Pictures
- Release date: June 23, 1939
- Running time: 68 minutes
- Country: United States
- Language: English

Grand Jury Secrets is a 1939 American mystery film directed by James P. Hogan and written by Irving Reis, Maxwell Shane and Robert Yost. The film stars John Howard, Gail Patrick, William Frawley, Jane Darwell, Porter Hall and Harvey Stephens. The film was released on June 23, 1939, by Paramount Pictures.

== Plot ==
Newspaper reporter and amateur ham radio operator John Keefe, anxious for a scoop, plants a shortwave radio in the courtroom to eavesdrop on the grand jury's investigation into the brokerage house owned by Anthony Pelton and Thomas Reedy, which is allegedly dealing in fraudulent stocks. When the story breaks in the newspaper under John's byline, John's brother Michael, the assistant district attorney, is castigated by his boss. Nevertheless, John continues to jeopardize his brother's career and decides to infiltrate the brokerage house by posing as Avery, a wealthy young investor from the South. In a meeting at Pelton and Reedy's office, John leaves behind his briefcase, which has a microphone concealed in it. Soon afterward, Pelton, who has become squeamish over the grand jury investigation, decides to skip town. While emptying the safe, Pelton is accosted by a gun wielding young man, and in the ensuing skirmish, the gun discharges into John's briefcase. As the young man falls unconscious to the floor, Reedy enters and shoots Pelton. When the police arrive, the young man is charged with Pelton's murder and Mike is assigned to the case. Meanwhile, John, who has been fired for drunkenness, is told by his editor that he will be rehired if he uncovers the mystery killer. Posing as a priest, John visits the accused in prison, where the young man confesses that Pelton tried to blackmail his father. When Mike learns of his brother's duplicity, he orders his arrest, and John is brought before the grand jury to testify. For refusing to betray the young man's confidence, John is jailed for contempt. While in jail, John's friend brings him the briefcase, and when John sees the bullet hole, he realizes that the young man is innocent. Begging his brother for a chance to make amends, John is released and goes to Reedy's office, where he digs a bullet from the desk. At that moment, Reedy enters and orders John into his car at gunpoint. Using the radio hidden in his briefcase, John broadcasts his location in Morse code, and ham radio operators pick it up and radio for help. As the district attorney and grand jury listen in, a motorcade surrounds the car and Reedy shoots John. Reedy tries to escape, but is captured by the police, and John is taken to the hospital, where he is reinstated by the paper.

== Cast ==
- John Howard as John Keefe
- Gail Patrick as Agnes Carren
- William Frawley as Bright Eyes
- Jane Darwell as Mrs. Keefe
- Porter Hall as Anthony Pelton
- Harvey Stephens as Michael Keefe
- John Hartley as Robson
- Elisha Cook Jr. as Robert Austin / Norman Hazlitt
- Kitty Kelly as Miss Clark
- Morgan Conway as Thomas Reedy
- Jack Norton as Doyle
- Richard Denning as Murph
- Frank M. Thomas as Benton
- Eddie Marr as Malin

== In popular culture ==
In the TV series Friends, the film's poster hangs in Joey's and Chandler's living room.
