= Bulldog Drummond's Revenge =

1937 film by Louis King

- Directed by: Louis King
- Screenplay by: Edward T. Lowe Jr.
- Based on: The Return of Bulldog Drummond; 1932 novel by Herman C. McNeile
- Produced by: Adolph Zukor; Stuart Walker
- Starring: John Barrymore; John Howard; Louise Campbell
- Cinematography: Harry Fischbeck
- Edited by: Arthur P. Schmidt
- Color process: Black and white
- Production company: Paramount Pictures
- Distributed by: Paramount Pictures
- Release dates: December 16, 1937 (New York City); January 7, 1938 (United States)
- Running time: 57 minutes
- Country: United States
- Language: English

Bulldog Drummond's Revenge is a 1937 American adventure mystery film directed by Louis King, produced by Stuart Walker, written by Edward T. Lowe Jr. and Herman C. McNeile (novel), and featuring John Barrymore. The picture stars John Howard in his second appearance as Bulldog Drummond. Top-billed John Barrymore portrays his friend Colonel Nielsen of Scotland Yard.

== Plot ==
Captain Hugh "Bulldog" Drummond, a British officer, while on a drive with his friend Algy Longworth and valet Tenny, is the first to discover a mysterious suitcase that has been parachuted from an aircraft above, minutes before the plane crashes. The case contains the highly explosive chemical hexanite, the formula for which has been stolen. Despite the urging of his fiancee Phyllis Claverling, Drummond is dragged into the mystery surrounding the affair, traveling by both train and ship to recover the formula.

== Cast ==
- John Barrymore as Col. J.A. Nielson
- John Howard as Capt. Hugh Chesterton "Bulldog" Drummond
- Louise Campbell as Phyllis Clavering
- Reginald Denny as Algy Longworth
- E. E. Clive as "Tenny" Tennison
- Frank Puglia as Draven Nogais
- Nydia Westman as Gwen Longworth
- Robert Gleckler as Hardcastle
- Lucien Littlefield as Mr. Smith
- John Sutton as Jennings, Nielson's Secretary
- Miki Morita as Sumio Kanda
- Benny Bartlett as Cabin Boy
- Matthew Boulton as Sir John Haxton
