= Texas Rangers Ride Again =

1940 film

- Theatrical release poster
- Directed by: James P. Hogan
- Screenplay by: William R. Lipman; Horace McCoy
- Produced by: William LeBaron
- Starring: Ellen Drew; John Howard; Akim Tamiroff; May Robson; Broderick Crawford; Charley Grapewin; John Miljan
- Cinematography: Archie Stout
- Edited by: Arthur P. Schmidt
- Music by: John Leipold
- Production company: Paramount Pictures
- Distributed by: Paramount Pictures
- Release date: December 13, 1940
- Running time: 68 minutes
- Country: United States
- Language: English

Texas Rangers Ride Again is a 1940 American Western film directed by James P. Hogan, written by William R. Lipman and Horace McCoy, and starring Ellen Drew, John Howard, Akim Tamiroff, May Robson, Broderick Crawford, Charley Grapewin, and John Miljan. It was released on December 13, 1940, by Paramount Pictures. It was a sequel to The Texas Rangers.

== Plot ==
Ellen Dangerfield returns to her grandparents' ranch in Texas after a 10-year absence when her widowed grandmother Cecilia Dangerfield loses 3000 head of cattle to rustlers. Fed up with her grandson Carter's unwillingness to track down the thieves, Cecilia appeals to her old beau, Ben Caldwalder, of the Texas Rangers, for help. To infiltrate the rustlers, Ranger Jim Kingston poses as an outlaw known as the Pecos Kid, and is hired by Joe Yuma, who owns the packing company. There, Jim learns that Joe has been slaughtering Dangerfield cattle and disposing their carcasses in a lime pit. With his partner, Mace Townsley, Jim sets out to learn who else is involved in the syndicate. When Palo Pete, one of Yuma's henchmen, tries to frame Jim for the murder of ranch hand Jake Porter, Ellen returns to her tomboyish ways and takes up her rifle to defend the ranch hands. That night, Yuma and his men slaughter more cattle on the ranch, and after dismantling their operation, take a convoy of trucks to the Portos Packing Company. Mace manages to send a message to the Rangers, and they apprehend Carter, who has been involved with the rustlers all along. Jim returns to the ranch to get Carter's address book when Yuma and his men attack the Dangerfield house. As Ellen, Jim, Ben, and Cecilia return the rustlers' fire, the Dangerfields' Mexican servant, Mio Pio, risks his life to get more ammunition. After the Rangers arrive to apprehend the rustlers, Jim and Ellen plan to wed and Ben orders Cecilia to marry him.

== Cast ==
- Ellen Drew as Ellen 'Slats' Dangerfield
- John Howard as Jim Kingston
- Akim Tamiroff as Mio Pio
- May Robson as Cecilia Dangerfield
- Broderick Crawford as Mace Townsley
- Charley Grapewin as Ben Caldwalder
- John Miljan as Carter Dangerfield
- William Duncan as Capt. Inglis
- Anthony Quinn as Joe Yuma
- Harvey Stephens as Ranger Blair
- Eva Puig as Maria
- Harold Goodwin as Ranger Comstock
- Edward Pawley as Palo Pete
- Eddie Foy, Jr. as Mandolin
- Joseph Crehan as Johnson
- James Pierce as High Boots
- Monte Blue as Pablo Slide Along
