= Bulldog Drummond in Africa =

1938 film by Louis King

- Directed by: Louis King
- Screenplay by: Garnett Weston
- Based on: Challenge; 1937 novel by Herman C. McNeile
- Starring: John Howard; Heather Angel
- Cinematography: William C. Mellor
- Edited by: Anne Bauchens
- Color process: Black and white
- Production company: Paramount Pictures
- Distributed by: Paramount Pictures
- Release date: August 5, 1938
- Running time: 58 minutes
- Country: United States
- Language: English

== Plot ==
On the eve of his wedding, Captain Hugh Drummond has more pressing concerns when he needs to set off from London for Morocco, after his fiancée (Phillis Clavering) has seen Colonel Nielsen from Scotland Yard being kidnapped by an international criminal gang, who try to force him to reveal the secrets of the British Empire's latest military technology. With his fiancée, friend Algy and valet Tennyson in tow, Drummond outwits Scotland Yard's bureaucratic blundering and flies his own plane the 1,200 miles to Morocco, only for the local British Consul to order him home. Drummond and his friends remain though and mount a rescue plan, eventually freeing the Colonel and causing the death of the leader of the criminal gang, who is mauled by one of his own pet lions.

== Cast ==
- John Howard as Capt. Hugh Chesterton "Bulldog" Drummond
- Heather Angel as Phyllis Clavering
- H.B. Warner as Col. J.A. Nielson
- J. Carrol Naish as Richard Lane
- Reginald Denny as Algernon "Algy" Longworth
- E.E. Clive as "Tenny" Tennyson
- Anthony Quinn as Fordine (a henchman)
- Michael Brooke as Baron Nevsky
- Matthew Boulton as Major Grey
- Neil Fitzgerald as McTurk (a British spy)
