= Kitty Kelly =

American actress (1902–1968)

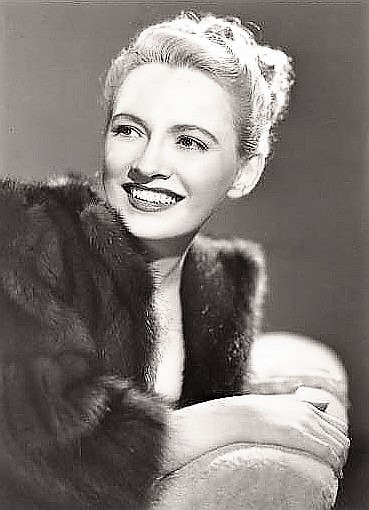
- Kelly in the 1930s
- Born: Sue O'Neil; April 27, 1902; New York City, U.S.
- Died: June 29, 1968 (aged 66); Los Angeles, California, U.S.
- Occupation: Actress
- Years active: 1925–1968

Kitty Kelly (born Sue O'Neil; April 27, 1902 – June 29, 1968) was an American stage and film character actress.

== Biography ==
Born in New York City in 1902, Kelly was best known as a member of the Ziegfeld Follies and her radio hosting with Columbia Broadcasting. One of her best-remembered roles is that of Lt. Ethel Armstrong in the 1943 Paramount wartime drama So Proudly We Hail!. She is probably better remembered, though, in the 1935 Our Gang comedy short Beginner's Luck.

After the war, she appeared in many TV series, including Bonanza, Alfred Hitchcock Presents, Batman, and Perry Mason, on which she made four guest appearances, including the role of Millie Foster in the 1958 episode "The Case of the Rolling Bones".

Kelly also performed in England.

== Death ==
Kelly died from cancer on June 29, 1968, in Hollywood, California.

== Partial filmography ==
Unless marked otherwise, filmography information was retrieved from the American Film Institute.

- A Kiss in the Dark (1925) - Chorus Girl
- La Nuit est à nous (1930) - Maud Sarazin
- Hot Bridge (1930, Short)
- Behind Office Doors (1931) - Delores Kogan
- Bachelor Apartment (1931) - Miss Clark, First Girl in Ladies Room
- White Shoulders (1931) - Maria Fontaine
- Men of Chance (1931) - Gertie Robbins
- Ladies of the Jury (1932) - Mayme Mixter
- Girl Crazy (1932) - Kate Foster
- The Girl in 419 (1933) - Kitty - Telephone Girl
- Headline Shooter (1933) - Sue, Burnett's New Moll (uncredited)
- Too Much Harmony (1933) - Patsy Dugan
- All of Me (1934) - Lorraine
- A Woman's Man (1934) - Molly Evans
- She Was a Lady (1934) - Daisy
- The Lemon Drop Kid (1934) - Cora Jennings
- Beginner's Luck (1935, Short) - Spanky's mother
- Dizzy Dames (1935) - La Vere
- The Farmer Takes a Wife (1935) - Ivy
- The Private Secretary (1935)
- The Man Behind the Mask (1936) - Marian Weeks
- Rhythm in the Air (1936) - Celia
- Blossoms on Broadway (1937) - Death Valley Cora Keane
- Men with Wings (1938) - Martha Ranson
- Grand Jury Secrets (1939) - Miss Clark
- Geronimo (1939) - Daisy Devine
- All Women Have Secrets (1939) - Flo
- Road to Singapore (1940) - Sailor's Wife (uncredited)
- Women Without Names (1940) - Countess
- Those Were the Days! (1940) - Mrs. Sanford (uncredited)
- The Mad Doctor (1941) - Winnie
- Hold Back the Dawn (1941) - American Lady at Bullfight (uncredited)
- The Lady Is Willing (1942) - Nellie Quigg
- Larceny, Inc. (1942) - Fourth customer (uncredited)
- They All Kissed the Bride (1942) - Spotter (uncredited)
- Holiday Inn (1942) - Drunk (uncredited)
- Lucky Jordan (1942) - Vera Maggotti
- So Proudly We Hail! (1943) - Lieutenant Ethel Armstrong
- Swing Out the Blues (1943) - Queenie (uncredited)
- Practically Yours (1944) - Wife - newsreel theater (uncredited)
- Two Years Before the Mast (1946) - Girl in Pub (uncredited)
- The Birds and the Bees (1956) - (uncredited)
- Gunsight Ridge (1957) - Mrs. Donahue
- Official Detective (1957, TV series) - Mrs. Johnson (uncredited)
- The Lost Missile (1958) - Mama - Ella's Mother
- Twelve Hours to Kill (1960) - Train Passenger
- Mary, Mary (1963) - Wife in Elevator (uncredited)
- The Lieutenant (1964, episode: "Gone the Sun") - Housekeeper
- The Third Day (1965) - Secretary (uncredited)
- Get Smart (1965, episode: "School Days") - The Woman
- Firecreek (1968) - Mrs. Sawyer (uncredited, final film role)

== Selected television appearances ==
- Alfred Hitchcock Presents (1958) (season 3, episode 32: "Listen, Listen...!") as Miss Andrews
- Alfred Hitchcock Presents (1958) (season 3, episode 39: "Little White Frock") as Marie
