= The Schaefer Century Theatre =

1952 American television anthology series

The Schaefer Century Theatre is a 30-minute American television anthology series sponsored by Schaefer Beer. A total of fourteen episodes aired in first-run syndication in 1952.

Natalie Wood made her TV debut in the show's "Playmates" episode. Among its other guest stars were Alan Napier, Bonita Granville, Garry Moore, Billy Gray, Ruth Warrick, Randy Stuart, Lynn Roberts, Robert Paige, Lynn Bari, Robert Hutton, John Sutton, Onslow Stevens, Whitfield Connor, and Alan Mowbray.

Writers whose works were adapted for the program included A. M. Burrage.
