= Radar Secret Service =

1950 film by Sam Newfield

- Theatrical release poster
- Directed by: Sam Newfield
- Written by: Beryl Sachs
- Produced by: Robert L. Lippert; Barney A. Sarecky
- Starring: John Howard; Adele Jergens
- Cinematography: Ernest Miller
- Edited by: Carl Pierson
- Music by: Russell Garcia; Richard Hazard
- Distributed by: Lippert Pictures
- Release date: January 28, 1950
- Running time: 61 minutes
- Country: United States
- Language: English

Radar Secret Service is a 1950 action film starring John Howard, produced by Barney A. Sarecky, and directed by Sam Newfield. The film was featured on the American television show Mystery Science Theater 3000.

== Plot ==
In the post-World War II era, Michael, a big wheel in the organized crime world, and his head man Mickey Moran devise a plan to steal a shipment of uranium-238. The theft is a success, but one of their henchmen named Blackie is caught. Radar Patrol sends Bill Travis, head of its OX-3 division, to find more information about the stolen radioactive material. Radar Patrol uses a picture of a waitress found on Blackie as a clue. They correctly deduce that the waitress must be Blackie's girlfriend and search every restaurant in town for her. When they finally find her, they recruit her as an informant.

OX-Q, the Radar Patrol headquarters, uses new radar technology to find a car carrying the radioactive material and tells OX-3 to pursue the car, but it did not have all of the material, and Mickey Moran manages to escape again. Radar Patrol uses a helicopter to detect where the rest of the material is hidden while Michael, Mickey and a woman pretending to be a girlfriend to both of them all try to concoct another plan. The finalized plan is to send a decoy car while Mickey delivers the bulk of the stuff to a river as Michael had instructed.

Mickey learns that he is being double-crossed by Michael right as Radar Patrol arrives. There is a three-way fight between Michael’s men, Mickey’s men and Radar Patrol. Mickey is shot but manages to drive to Michael’s apartment, but is shot a second time by Michael and killed. Michael and the woman who is with him try to escape, but then Blackie’s girlfriend appears with a gun, angry that Michael has not yet found a way to spring Blackie from jail. She tries to call the police, but Michael abruptly shoots her. Michael and the woman try to escape yet again, but Radar Patrol arrives and catches them. Radar Patrol can now acquire some new equipment because their budget has been increased.

== Cast ==
- John Howard as Bill Travis
- Adele Jergens as Lila
- Tom Neal as Mickey Moran
- Myrna Dell as Marge
- Sid Melton as Pill Box
- Ralph Byrd as Static
- Robert Kent as Henchman Benson
- Pierre Watkin as Mr. Hamilton (credited as Pierre Watkins)
- Tristram Coffin as Michael
- Riley Hill as Henchman Blackie
- Robert Carson as Tom, Radar Operator
- Kenne Duncan as Michael's Henchman
- Holly Bane as Truck Radio Operator, OX-2
- Bill Crespinel as Helicopter Operator
- Bill Hammond as Henchman Joe #2
- Jan Kayne as Myrtle the Maid
- John McKee as Second Bruiser
- Marshall Reed as First Bruiser
- Boyd Stockman as Henchman Joe #1
- Bob Woodward as Henchman Gus

== Mystery Science Theater 3000 episode ==
The Mystery Science Theater 3000 presentation of the film was paired with the railroad crossing safety short film Last Clear Chance in Episode #520, which first aired on December 18, 1993.
