= Bulldog Drummond's Bride =

1939 film by James P. Hogan

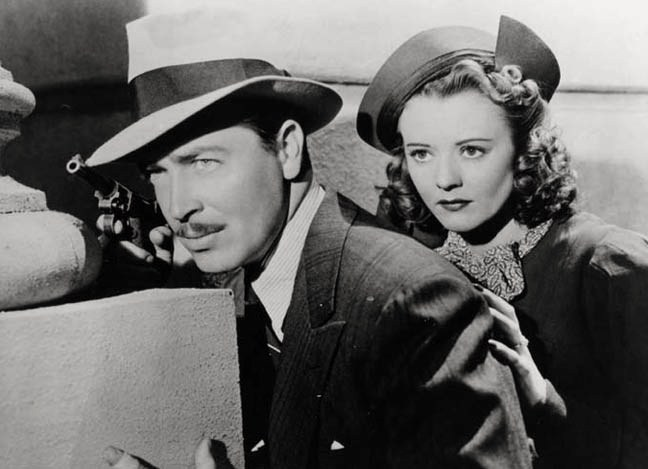
- John Howard and Heather Angel
- Directed by: James P. Hogan
- Screenplay by: Stuart Palmer; Garnett Weston
- Based on: The Oriental Mind; 1937 story in Strand Magazine by H.C. McNeile
- Produced by: William LeBaron (producer); Stuart Walker (producer)
- Starring: John Howard; Heather Angel; H.B. Warner
- Cinematography: Harry Fischbeck
- Edited by: Chandler House
- Music by: John Leipold
- Production company: Paramount Pictures
- Release date: July 12, 1939
- Running time: 56 minutes
- Country: United States
- Language: English

Bulldog Drummond's Bride is an American crime comedy thriller film produced in 1939. It was the last film of Paramount Pictures' Bulldog Drummond film series.

== Plot ==
Henri Armides believes he has a foolproof plan for robbing a London bank and outwitting Scotland Yard's pursuit. During his getaway he hides his haul in a radio set in the flat to be occupied by Capt. Bulldog Drummond and Phyllis Clavering after their imminent and long-delayed wedding. Phyllis is waiting for Drummond in a French village, once again expecting to be married the next day. She sends a telegram, asking Drummond to send her the radio, both unaware of its contents. The ensuing pursuit of the radio leads to fights, an expedition to France, a night in a French jail cell for Drummond and a break-out. The villain meets his end in a rooftop fight and Bulldog Drummond and Phyllis Clavering finally tie the matrimonial knot.

== Cast ==
- John Howard as Captain Hugh Chesterton "Bulldog" Drummond
- Heather Angel as Phyllis Clavering
- H.B. Warner as Col. J.A. Nielson
- Reginald Denny as Algy Longworth
- E.E. Clive as "Tenny" Tennison
- Elizabeth Patterson as Aunt Blanche Clavering
- Eduardo Ciannelli as Henri Armides
- Gerald Hamer as Garvey (Armides' Henchman)
- John Sutton as Inspector Tredennis
- Neil Fitzgerald as Evan Barrows
- Louis Mercier as Mayor Jean Philippe Napoleon Dupres
- Adia Kuznetzoff as Gaston
- Adrienne D'Ambricourt as Theresa
- Clyde Cook as Constable Sacker

== See also ==
- Bulldog Drummond
