= John Howard (American actor) =

American actor (1913–1995)

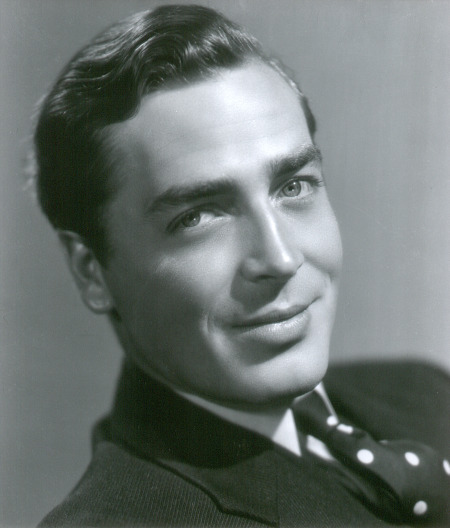
- Born: John Richard Cox Jr. April 14, 1913; Cleveland, Ohio, U.S.
- Died: February 19, 1995 (aged 81); Santa Rosa, California, U.S.
- Education: Case Western Reserve University
- Occupation: Actor
- Years active: 1934–1978
- Spouse: Eva Ralf
- Children: 4

John Howard (born John Richard Cox Jr.; April 14, 1913 – February 19, 1995) was an American actor. He is best remembered for his roles in the films Lost Horizon (1937) and The Philadelphia Story (1940).

Howard played Bulldog Drummond in seven films which were produced by Paramount. He also appeared in many television series and received a star on the Hollywood Walk of Fame.

== Early life ==
Howard was born in Cleveland, Ohio. He was a Phi Beta Kappa graduate of what now is Case Western Reserve University. At college he discovered a love for the theater, and took part in student productions.

One night, a talent scout from Paramount was in Cleveland to see the local stock company. The show was not on that night, so the scout decided to go and see a play at the local university. He was impressed by Howard in a production of John Brown's Body and arranged for a screen test.

== Career ==
=== Paramount ===
Howard became a contract player for Paramount under the name of "Jon Cox". He appeared uncredited in One Hour Late (1934). Small roles followed in Car 99 (1935) and Four Hours to Kill! (1935).

He changed his name to John Howard and had a bigger part in Annapolis Farewell (1935).

=== Leading man ===
Paramount promoted him to a leading man in just his fourth film, Millions in the Air (1935), though it was a "B" movie.

He was second billed in Soak the Rich (1936), made for Paramount by the team of Ben Hecht and Charles MacArthur.

Paramount put him in an "A" feature, 13 Hours by Air (1936), and he was fourth billed in the credits. He starred in Border Flight (1936) alongside Frances Farmer and had a good part in Valiant Is the Word for Carrie (1936), with Gladys George.

Howard also starred in the comedy Easy to Take (1936) with Marsha Hunt.

According to David Shipman, "Howard..., was tried out in various capacities – supporting roles in As, leads in Bs, and on loan-outs. These last could be significant: the smaller studios had restricted contract lists and were prepared to pay well to borrow good-looking guys whose acting consisted mainly of not bumping into the furniture".

=== Lost Horizon ===
Howard's first memorable role came on loan out to Columbia: as Ronald Colman's younger brother in Lost Horizon (1937), directed by Frank Capra. Capra had seen him in Annapolis Farewell and arranged for a screen test. The film was a huge success and really established Howard, who later said "without Lost Horizon I doubt very much whether I would have survived in Hollywood".

Howard was borrowed by Universal for the lead in Let Them Live (1937). Back at Paramount, he supported Bob Burns and Martha Raye in Mountain Music (1937).

At RKO, Howard did Hitting a New High (1937) with Lily Pons and Jack Oakie. Columbia used him in Penitentiary (1938) with Walter Connolly.

He and Lew Ayres were in a buddy comedy, Hold 'Em Navy (1937), then Howard supported Lloyd Nolan and Shirley Ross in Prison Farm (1938) and starred in Touchdown, Army (1938) and Grand Jury Secrets (1939).

=== Bulldog Drummond ===
Since 1937, Paramount had made a series of "B" movies about daring adventurer Bulldog Drummond. The first of the actors to play the role, Ray Milland, was in Bulldog Drummond Escapes (1937). Milland was being groomed for more important pictures, so the studio offered the role of the British hero, Captain Hugh Drummond, to John Howard. Howard was himself not British, so he chose not to attempt a British accent, relying instead on diction to get the idea across. In his first performance as Drummond, Bulldog Drummond Comes Back (1937), Howard took second billing to John Barrymore, who played Inspector Nielson of Scotland Yard. According to Shipman, Howard "proved himself a resourceful, debonair, and witty player, his double-breasted suits and trilbies an admirable choice." Howard continued opposite Barrymore in Bulldog Drummond's Revenge (1937), and Bulldog Drummond's Peril (1938). H. B. Warner replaced Barrymore in Bulldog Drummond in Africa (1938), Arrest Bulldog Drummond (1939), Bulldog Drummond's Secret Police (1939), and Bulldog Drummond's Bride (1939), the last in the series. As Shipman said, about the Drummond films, "[The] titles, splendidly, had nothing to do with the plots (since Drummond was never captured, there was nowhere to escape from) and the inconsequence was pleasing... All the while the spider's-web plots (of death threats, disguises, ambushes, sobbing women and booby-trapped motor-cars) hurtled to the screen – under various directors – with superior production values. They are more enjoyable than competitors featuring the Falcon, Charlie Chan, the Lone Wolf, Sexton Blake et al. due in part to Howard's insouciant playing".

=== The Philadelphia Story ===
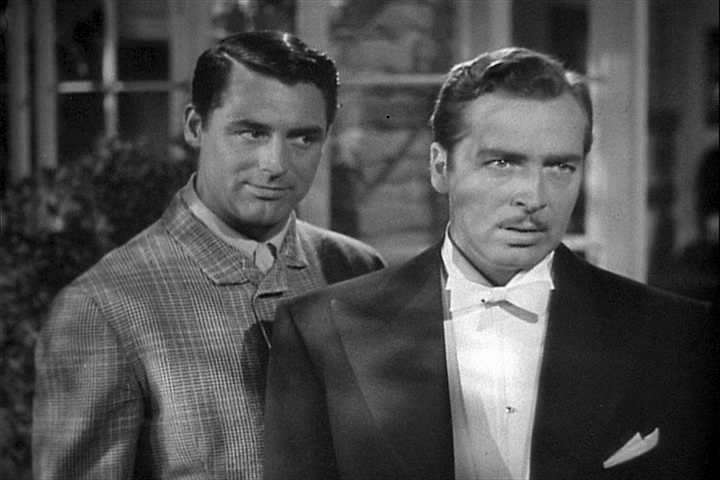
With Cary Grant in The Philadelphia Story

Howard made What a Life (1939) with Betty Grable and Disputed Passage (1940) with Dorothy Lamour. The latter was a flop at the box office, and Paramount began to cool on Howard.

Universal borrowed him to play a key role in Green Hell (1940). MGM used him in The Man from Dakota (1940), supporting Wallace Beery, and The Philadelphia Story (1940), where he played the fiancé of Katharine Hepburn, competing for her amorous attentions with characters played by Cary Grant and James Stewart. It remains one of his best-known films.

Back at Paramount, Howard was top-billed in Texas Rangers Ride Again (1940). Universal borrowed him to play the leading man in The Invisible Woman (1941) with Barrymore and Virginia Bruce.

At Paramount, he supported Basil Rathbone in The Mad Doctor (1941), then Universal gave him the lead in Tight Shoes (1941). At RKO, he supported Adolphe Menjou and Gloria Swanson in Father Takes a Wife (1941), then at Columbia he was Joan Blondell's leading man in the farce comedy Three Girls About Town (1941).

Howard was top billed in Republic Pictures' A Tragedy at Midnight (1942). At Columbia, he had the starring role in The Man Who Returned to Life (1942), and Submarine Raider (1942), then he did Isle of Missing Men (1942) for Monogram Pictures.

Howard wanted to join the navy, but there was a delay after he signed a contract with 20th Century Fox, who put him in The Undying Monster (1942), in which he was third billed.

== Military service ==
Howard served in the United States Navy as a lieutenant during World War II, later becoming an executive officer aboard the minesweeper USS YMS-24, aboard which he participated in landing operations at the Allied invasion of Sicily, Allied invasion of Italy, and Anzio, and deception operations against the island of Sardinia and in "Operation Dragoon" on the South coast of Vichy France. During 'Operation Dragoon' off the French coast on August 16, 1944 USS YMS-24 struck a sea mine, killing its captain and severely damaging the ship. Howard took command and fought to save the vessel, jumping into the sea several times to save crew members who had fallen overboard. For his actions he was awarded both the United States' Navy Cross and the French Croix de Guerre.

== Return to acting ==
Upon his return to Hollywood, Howard struggled to re-establish himself. He was told that Fox had no projects for him, so he ended his contract with them to do a play -- which closed out of town. "It was a long, long period of absolute dearth," he later said.

He had support parts in Love from a Stranger (1947) for Bryan Foy at Eagle-Lion Films and I, Jane Doe (1948) for Republic.

He starred in Public Prosecutor, the first dramatic TV drama series shot on film. It was filmed in 1947 but not shown until several years later. Public Prosecutor was ultimately broadcast as part of Crawford Mystery Theatre in 1951.

He was in "Entrapment" on NBC Presents in 1949.

Howard supported John Wayne in The Fighting Kentuckian (1949) for Republic and had the lead in Radar Secret Service (1950) for the low-budget Lippert Pictures.

Howard guest-starred on shows like Lights Out, The Bigelow Theatre and Pulitzer Prize Playhouse and had leads in low-budget films like Experiment Alcatraz (1950).

Howard was in Models Inc. (1952) and Make Haste to Live (1954) and guest starred on Schlitz Playhouse, Suspense, Four Star Playhouse, and The Loretta Young Show. His first high-profile film in a long while came when he played Laraine Day's husband in The High and the Mighty (1954).

Howard made his Broadway debut in 1953 in Hazel Flagg where he met his future wife, the ballerina and actress Eva Ralf.

=== Television star ===
Howard continued to work in TV appearing in General Electric Theater, The Pepsi-Cola Playhouse, The Millionaire, The Whistler, The Ford Television Theatre, The Star and the Story, Science Fiction Theatre, Studio 57, Fireside Theatre, TV Reader's Digest, Front Row Center, and Lux Video Theatre.

He had the lead in a series, Dr. Hudson's Secret Journal (1955–57). The series raised Howard's profile, and he was offered the lead in The Unknown Terror (1957). In 1958 he starred in another TV series, Adventures of the Sea Hawk, which ran for 26 episodes.

=== 1960s ===
Howard's 1960s acting work included guest spots on Lawman, Wagon Train, Men into Space, Cheyenne, The Magical World of Disney, The Americans, Outlaws, Gunslinger, Lock Up, Bronco, Surfside 6, 77 Sunset Strip, Rawhide, Hawaiian Eye, Perry Mason, Branded, Profiles in Courage, Days of Our Lives, and The Lucy Show, and The Legend of Jesse James.

He formed a friendship with Fred MacMurray, star of the TV series My Three Sons who, like Howard, had worked in Paramount features of the 1930s. Howard was a regular guest star on the show, playing MacMurray's boss. Series producer Don Fedderson used Howard in his other series, Family Affair and To Rome with Love. Howard also had roles in the feature films Destination Inner Space (1966) and The Destructors (1967).

=== 1970s ===
Howard could be seen in Eye for an Eye (1971), The Bold Ones: The New Doctors, Mission: Impossible, Buck and the Preacher (1972), The Brady Bunch, Mod Squad, The ABC Afternoon Playbreak, The New Perry Mason, So Evil, My Sister, Capone (1975), Little House on the Prairie, Bronk, Wonder Woman, Police Woman and The Rockford Files.

== Filmography ==
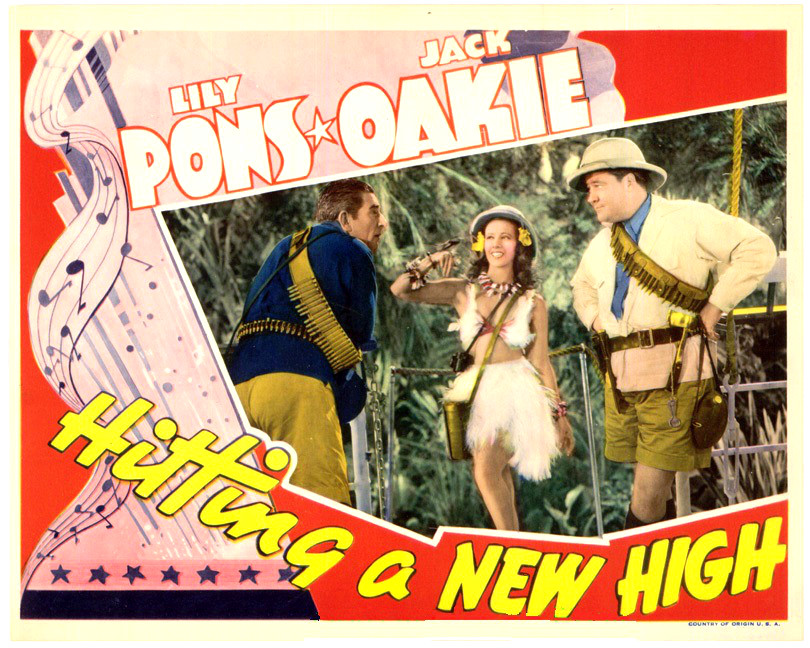
Lobby card for Hitting a New High (1937)

Title	Year	Role	Notes
One Hour Late	1934	Elevator Operator	Uncredited
Car 99	1935	Recruit Carney	
Four Hours to Kill!	1935	Assistant Repairman	
Annapolis Farewell	1935	Duncan Haley	
Millions in the Air	1935	Eddie Warren	
Soak the Rich	1936	Kenneth "Buzz" Jones	
Thirteen Hours by Air	1936	Freddie Scott	
Border Flight	1936	Lt. Dan Conlon	
Valiant Is the Word for Carrie	1936	Paul Darnley	
Easy to Take	1936	Rodney Garfield	
Lost Horizon	1937	George Conway	
Let Them Live	1937	Dr. Paul Martin	
Mountain Music	1937	Ardinger Burnside	
Bulldog Drummond Comes Back	1937	Captain Hugh C. 'Bulldog' Drummond	Lead
That Navy Spirit	1937	Chuck Baldwin	
Bulldog Drummond's Revenge	1937	Captain Hugh C. 'Bulldog' Drummond	
Hitting a New High	1937	Jimmy James	
Penitentiary	1938	William Jordan	
Bulldog Drummond's Peril	1938	Captain Hugh C. 'Bulldog' Drummond	
Prison Farm	1938	Dr. Roi Conrad	
Bulldog Drummond in Africa	1938	Captain Hugh C. 'Bulldog' Drummond	
Touchdown, Army	1938	Cadet Brandon Culpepper	
Arrest Bulldog Drummond	1938	Captain Hugh C. 'Bulldog' Drummond	
Bulldog Drummond's Secret Police	1939	Captain Hugh C. 'Bulldog' Drummond	Lead
Grand Jury Secrets	1939	John Keefe	
Bulldog Drummond's Bride	1939	Captain Hugh C. 'Bulldog' Drummond	Lead
What a Life	1939	Mr. Nelson	
Disputed Passage	1939	John Wesley Beaven	
Green Hell	1940	Hal Scott	
The Man from Dakota	1940	Lt. Oliver Clark	
The Philadelphia Story	1940	George Kittredge	
Texas Rangers Ride Again	1940	James Kingston aka Pecos Kid	Lead
The Invisible Woman	1940	Richard Russell	
The Mad Doctor	1941	Gil Sawyer	
Tight Shoes	1941	Jimmy Rupert	Lead
Father Takes a Wife	1941	Frederic Osborne Junior	
Three Girls About Town	1941	Tommy Hopkins	
A Tragedy at Midnight	1942	Greg Sherman	Lead
The Man Who Returned to Life	1942	David Hampton Jameson / George Bishop	Lead
Submarine Raider	1942	Commander Chris Warren	Lead
Isle of Missing Men	1942	Merrill Hammond	Lead
The Undying Monster	1942	Oliver Hammond	
Love from a Stranger	1947	Nigel Lawrence	
I, Jane Doe	1948	William Hilton	
The Fighting Kentuckian	1949	Blake Randolph	
Radar Secret Service	1950	Bill Travis	
Experiment Alcatraz	1950	Dr. Ross Williams	
Models Inc.	1952	John Stafford	
Make Haste to Live	1954	Josh Blake	
The High and the Mighty	1954	Howard Rice	
The Unknown Terror	1957	Dan Matthews	
Destination Inner Space	1967	Dr. James	
The Destructors	1968	Ernest Bushnell	
El sabor de la venganza	1971		
Buck and the Preacher	1972	George	
So Evil, My Sister	1974	Dr. Thomas	
Capone	1975	Warden J. Johnston	last film

== Television ==
TV series	Year	Role	Episode
Science Fiction Theatre	1955	John Emerson	episode: The Brain of John Emerson
Lawman	1960	Lance Creedy	episode: The Showdown
Wagon Train	1960	Colonel James Harris	episode: The Colonel Harris Story
Cheyenne	1960	John Thompson	episode: Home Is the Brave
Walt Disney's Wonderful World of Color	1962	Mayor Wood	episodes: Moochie of Pop Warner Football: Pee Wees Versus City Hall & Moochie of Pop Warner Football: From Ticonderoga to Disneyland
Rawhide	1962	James Carr	episode: The Captain's Wife
Perry Mason	1964	Harley Leonard	episode: The Case of the Ruinous Road
My Three Sons	1964	Buddy Albert	episode: Adventures in New York
My Three Sons	1965	Mr. Hargraves	episode: Be My Guest
My Three Sons	1965–1967	Dave Welch	episodes: Office Mother & Douglas a Go-Go & Charley, the Pigeon & From Maggie with Love & Whatever Happened to Baby Chip? & Stag at Bay & Good Guys Finish Last & Happy Birthday World & A Falling Star & My Pal Dad & TV or Not TV & Weekend in Paradise
The Legend of Jesse James	1966	Dr. Samuel	episode: 1863
Family Affair	1967	Myron Fox	episode: Star Dust
Mannix	1969	Dr. Daniels	episode: A Question of Midnight
The Brady Bunch	1971–1972	Dr. Howard & Doctor	episodes: Coming Out Party & Today, I Am a Freshman
Mission: Impossible	1972	Foreman	episode: Committed
Mod Squad	1973	Dr. Brandson	episode: Put Out the Welcome Mat for Death
The New Perry Mason	1973–1974	Judge Channing & Judge	episodes: The Case of the Ominous Oath & The Case of the Tortured Titan
Police Woman	1974	Leland Perrier	episode: The End Game
Bronk	1976	Judge Sheehan	episode: Long Time Dying
Little House on the Prairie	1976	Hiram Potter	episode: The Pride of Walnut Grove
Wonder Woman	1977	Dr. Diderich	episode: Last of the $2 Bills
Police Woman	1977	David Earl	episode: Bondage
The Rockford Files	1978	Mort	episodes: Black Mirror: Parts 1 & 2, (final appearance)

== Bibliography ==
- Wise, James. Stars in Blue: Movie Actors in America's Sea Services. Annapolis, Maryland: Naval Institute Press, 1997. ISBN 1557509379 OCLC 36824724
