= James P. Hogan (director) =

Director

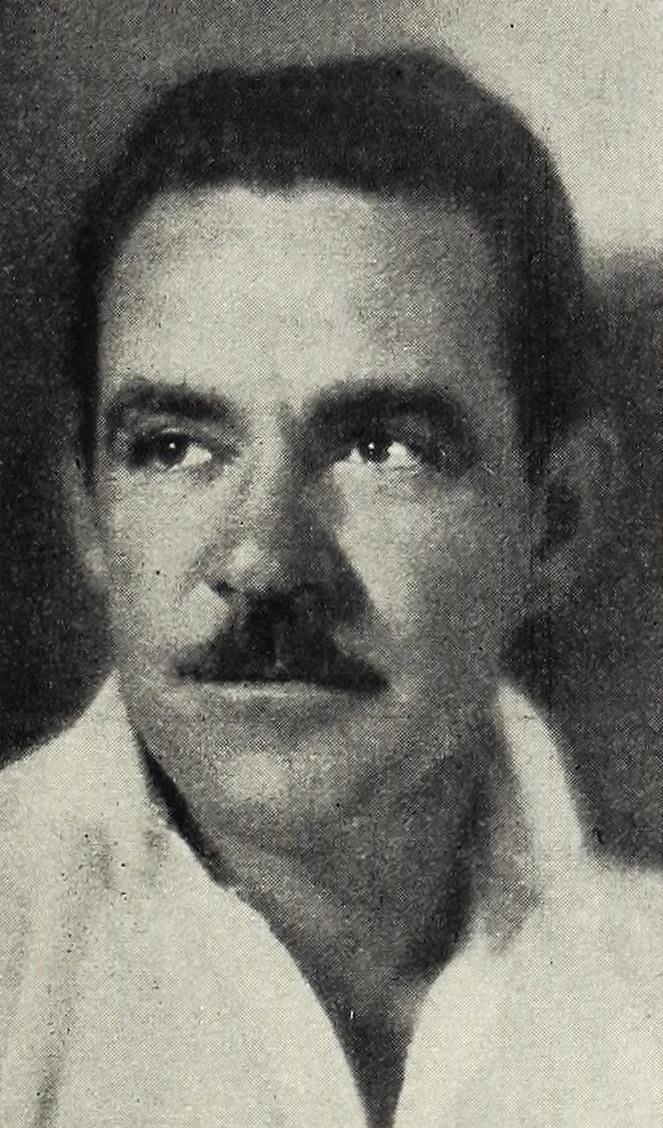
- Hogan c. 1926
- Born: James Patrick Hogan; September 21, 1890; Lowell, Massachusetts
- Died: November 4, 1943 (aged 53); Van Nuys, California
- Occupation: Director

James Patrick Hogan (commonly referred to as simply James Hogan) (September 21, 1890 – November 4, 1943) was an American filmmaker and playwright. The films Hogan directed include Bulldog Drummond's Secret Police (1939) and The Mad Ghoul (1943), his last film.

== Early life ==
James Patrick Hogan was born in Lowell, Massachusetts. As a young man, he worked as a professional baseball player.

== Career ==
In 1916, Hogan began working as a propman for Mary Pickford. His career was disrupted by World War I, serving with the United States Army in the Philippines and Siberia. He returned to the film industry in 1919, becoming assistant director to Douglas Fairbanks.

In 1943, Hogan teamed with comedian Tom Dugan to write a play titled The Barber Had Two Sons.

== Personal life ==
Hogan died at his Van Nuys home on November 4, 1943. At the time of his death, he had been married to his wife Ina for twelve years and had a three-year-old daughter named Kathleen.

== Filmography ==
- The Skywayman (1920)
- The Little Grey Mouse (1920)
- Bare Knuckles (1921)
- Where's My Wandering Boy Tonight? (1922)
- Unmarried Wives (1924)
- Black Lightning (1924)
- Capital Punishment (1925)
- Women and Gold (1925)
- The Mansion of Aching Hearts (1925)
- Capital Punishment (1925)
- Jimmie's Millions (1925)
- The Bandit's Baby (1925)
- My Lady's Lips (1925)
- S.O.S. Perils of the Sea (1925)
- Steel Preferred (1925)
- The King of the Turf (1926)
- The Isle of Retribution (1926)
- Flaming Fury (1926)
- The Final Extra (1927)
- The Silent Avenger (1927)
- Mountains of Manhattan (1927)
- Finnegan's Ball (1927)
- The Broken Mask (1928)
- Hearts of Men (1928)
- Burning Bridges (1928)
- Code of the Air (1928)
- Top Sergeant Mulligan (1928)
- The Border Patrol (1928)
- The Sheriff's Secret (1931)
- The Seventh Commandment (1932)
- Paradise Valley (1934)
- Life Returns (1935)
- Desert Gold (1936)
- The Arizona Raiders (1936)
- The Accusing Finger (1936)
- Arizona Mahoney (1936)
- Bulldog Drummond Escapes (1937)
- The Last Train from Madrid (1937)
- Ebb Tide (1937)
- Scandal Street (1938)
- Bulldog Drummond's Peril (1938)
- The Texans (1938)
- Sons of the Legion (1938)
- Arrest Bulldog Drummond (1939)
- Bulldog Drummond's Secret Police (1939)
- Grand Jury Secrets (1939)
- Bulldog Drummond's Bride (1939)
- $1000 a Touchdown (1939)
- The Farmer's Daughter (1940)
- Queen of the Mob (1940)
- Texas Rangers Ride Again (1940)
- Ellery Queen's Penthouse Mystery (1941)
- Power Dive (1941)
- Ellery Queen and the Perfect Crime (1941)
- Ellery Queen and the Murder Ring (1941)
- A Close Call for Ellery Queen (1942)
- A Desperate Chance for Ellery Queen (1942)
- Enemy Agents Meet Ellery Queen (1942)
- No Place for a Lady (1943)
- The Strange Death of Adolf Hitler (1943)
- The Mad Ghoul (1943)
