= Kidnapped (1938 film) =

1938 adventure film by Alfred L. Werker en Otto Preminger

- 1938 US Theatrical Poster
- Directed by: Otto Preminger (uncredited); Alfred L. Werker
- Screenplay by: Sonya Levien; Eleanor Harris; Ernest Pascal; Edwin Blum; Walter Ferris (uncredited); Richard Sherman (uncredited)
- Story by: Curtis Kenyo (uncredited)
- Based on: Kidnapped; 1886 novel by Robert Louis Stevenson
- Produced by: Kenneth Macgowan
- Starring: Warner Baxter; Freddie Bartholomew; C. Aubrey Smith; Miles Mander; Reginald Owen
- Cinematography: Gregg Toland
- Edited by: Allen McNeil
- Music by: Arthur Lange
- Production company: 20th Century-Fox
- Distributed by: 20th Century-Fox
- Release date: May 27, 1938
- Running time: 85 minutes
- Country: United States
- Language: English

Kidnapped is a 1938 American adventure film directed by Otto Preminger (who was uncredited) and Alfred L. Werker, starring Warner Baxter and Freddie Bartholomew. It is based on the 1886 novel Kidnapped by Robert Louis Stevenson.

The copyright to the film was renewed.

== Plot ==
In 1747, David Balfour's evil uncle arranges for him to be kidnapped and sent to sea where he meets exile Alan Breck. The two make their way back to Scotland and justice.

== Cast ==
- Warner Baxter as Alan Breck
- Freddie Bartholomew as David Balfour
- Arleen Whelan as Jean MacDonald
- C. Aubrey Smith as Duke of Argyle
- Reginald Owen as Captain Hoseason
- John Carradine as Gordon
- Nigel Bruce as Neil MacDonald
- Miles Mander as Ebenezer Balfour
- Ralph Forbes as James
- H. B. Warner as Angus Rankeillor
- Arthur Hohl as Riach
- E. E. Clive as Minister MacDougall
- Halliwell Hobbes as Dominie Campbell
- Montagu Love as Colonel Whitehead
- Moroni Olsen as Douglas
- Leonard Mudie as Red Fox
- Mary Gordon as Mrs. MacDonald
- C. Montague Shaw as Scotch Statesman
- Russell Hicks as Bailiff
- Holmes Herbert as Judge
- Brandon Hurst as Doomster
- Harry Tenbrook as Crewman (uncredited)

== Production notes ==
- Production Dates: 3 Jan-mid-Mar 1938
- The film's credits open with a picture of Robert Louis Stevenson lying in bed writing.
- The screen credit for the title reads, "Robert Louis Stevenson's Kidnapped: The Adventures of David Balfour."
- In his autobiography, Otto Preminger recounts that he was surprised when, after having directed only two films in Hollywood, he was assigned to Kidnapped, a big-budget film. Preminger, who was not familiar with the book, read the script and complained to his friend, Gregory Ratoff, who was acting as Zanuck's assistant, that he did not want to direct the film because he had no understanding of the people in the part of the world where the story took place. Ratoff, however, persuaded him to accept. When Zanuck saw some of the rushes, he accused Preminger of cutting out a portion of the script without permission. During a heated argument, Preminger denied the charge, and when Zanuck yelled at him, Preminger yelled back. Preminger subsequently refused to apologize, and, according to the autobiography, because of the incident, he was prevented from working in Hollywood. He returned to stage direction and did not direct another film until 1943.
- Other films based on the same book include a 1948 Monogram release starring Roddy McDowell and Dan O'Herlihy and directed by William Beaudine; a 1960 Walt Disney production directed by Robert Stevenson and starring Peter Finch and James MacArthur; and a 1971 American International Pictures version, directed by Delbert Mann and starring Michael Caine and Lawrence Douglas.

== See also ==
- List of American films of 1938
- Kidnapped (1960 film)
