= List of works by H. C. McNeile =

H. C. McNeile bibliography
- Novels↙: 15
- Articles↙: 1
- Stories↙: 20
- Collections↙: 1
- Plays↙: 3
- Scripts↙: 1
- Books edited↙: 1

Cyril McNeile, MC (born Herman Cyril McNeile; 1888–1937) was a British soldier and author. During the First World War he wrote short stories based on his experiences in the trenches with the Royal Engineers. These were published in the Daily Mail under the pseudonym Sapper, the nickname of his regiment, and were later published as collections through Hodder & Stoughton. McNeile also wrote a series of articles titled The Making of an Officer, which appeared under the initials C. N., in five issues of The Times between 8 and 14 June 1916; these were also subsequently collected together and published. During the course of the war, McNeile wrote more than 80 collected and uncollected stories.

McNeile continued writing after he left the army in 1919, although he stopped writing war stories and began to publish thrillers. In 1920 he published Bulldog Drummond, whose eponymous hero became his best-known creation. The character was based on McNeile himself, his idea of an English gentleman and his friend Gerard Fairlie. (Note: Bourn disputes the Fairlie background to the character, noting that it was Fairlie who made the claim, although "he was still at school when Sapper created his ... hero".) McNeile wrote ten Bulldog Drummond novels, as well as three plays and a screenplay.

McNeile interspersed his Drummond work with other novels and story collections, including two characters who appeared as protagonists in their own works, Jim Maitland and Ronald Standish. McNeile was one of the most successful British popular authors of the inter-war period, before his death in 1937 from throat cancer, which has been attributed to being caught in a gas attack in the war.

== Short story collections ==
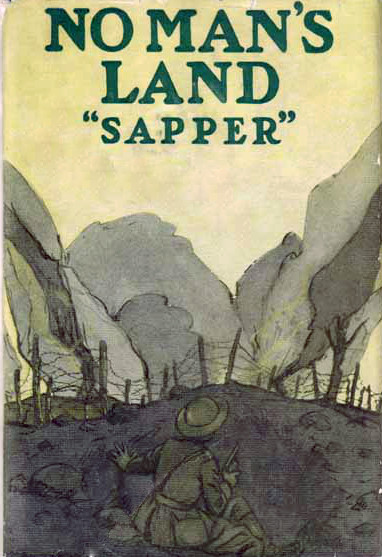
US cover of No Man's Land, published in 1917

The short story collections of H. C. McNeile
Title	Year of first publication	First edition publisher	Name or pseudonym used	Ref.
The Lieutenant and Others	1915	Hodder & Stoughton (London)	Sapper	
Sergeant Michael Cassidy, R.E.	1915	Hodder & Stoughton (London)	Sapper	
Men, Women, and Guns	1916	Hodder & Stoughton (London)	Sapper	
No Man's Land	1917	Hodder & Stoughton (London)	Sapper	
The Human Touch	1918	Hodder & Stoughton (London)	Sapper	
The Man in Ratcatcher, and other stories	1921	Hodder & Stoughton (London)	McNeile	
The Dinner Club	1923	Hodder & Stoughton (London)	McNeile	
Out of the Blue	1925	Hodder & Stoughton (London)	Sapper	
Jim Brent	1926	Hodder & Stoughton (London)	Sapper	
Word of Honour	1926	Hodder & Stoughton (London)	Sapper	
Shorty Bill	1927	Hodder & Stoughton (London)	Sapper	
The Saving Clause	1927	Hodder & Stoughton (London)	Sapper	
When Carruthers Laughed	1927	George H. Doran Company (New York)	McNeile	(Note: Published in the UK in 1934 by Hodder & Stoughton under the pseudonym Sapper.)
John Walters	1927	Hodder & Stoughton (London)	Sapper	
Sapper's War Stories	1930	Hodder & Stoughton (London)	Sapper	
The Finger of Fate	1930	Hodder & Stoughton (London)	Sapper	
Ronald Standish	1933	Hodder & Stoughton (London)	Sapper	
51 Stories	1934	Hodder & Stoughton (London)	Sapper	
Ask For Ronald Standish	1936	Hodder & Stoughton (London)	Sapper	
The Best Short Stories	1984	Littlehampton Book Services (Littlehampton)	Sapper	

== Novels ==
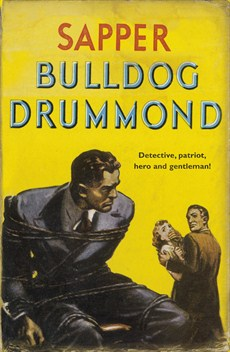
First edition cover of Bulldog Drummond

The novels of H. C. McNeile
Title	Year of first publication	First edition publisher	Name or pseudonym used	Ref.
Mufti	1919	Hodder & Stoughton (London)	McNeile	
Bull-Dog Drummond	1920	Hodder & Stoughton (London)	McNeile	
The Black Gang	1922	Hodder & Stoughton (London)	McNeile	
Jim Maitland	1923	Hodder & Stoughton (London)	McNeile	
The Third Round	1924	Hodder & Stoughton (London)	McNeile	
The Final Count	1926	Hodder & Stoughton (London)	Sapper	
The Female of the Species	1928	Hodder & Stoughton (London)	Sapper	
Temple Tower	1929	Hodder & Stoughton (London)	Sapper	
Tiny Carteret	1930	Hodder & Stoughton (London)	Sapper	
The Island of Terror	1931	Hodder & Stoughton (London)	Sapper	
The Return of Bull-Dog Drummond	1932	Hodder & Stoughton (London)	Sapper	
Knock-Out (US title Bulldog Drummond Strikes Back)	1933	Hodder & Stoughton (London)	Sapper	
Bull-Dog Drummond at Bay	1935	Hodder & Stoughton (London)	Sapper	
Challenge	1937	Hodder & Stoughton (London)	Sapper	
Bulldog Drummond—His Four Rounds with Carl Peterson	1967	Hodder & Stoughton (London)	Sapper	(Note: Omnibus edition, containing Bull-Dog Drummond, The Black Gang, The Third Round and The Final Count.)

== Others ==
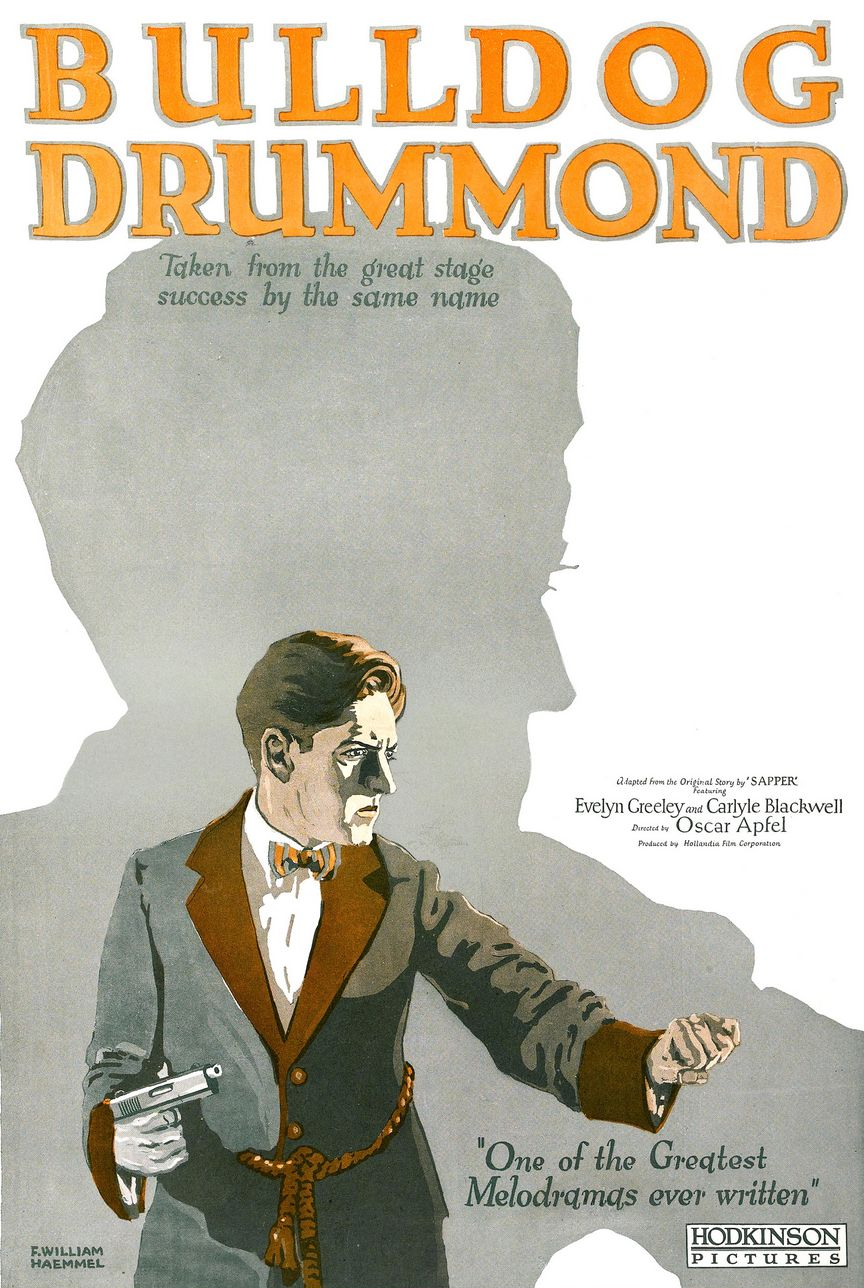
Poster for the 1922 film Bulldog Drummond, based on McNeile's play of the same name

Other works of H. C. McNeile
Title	Year of first publication	First edition publisher	Category	Name or pseudonym used	Notes	Ref.
The Making of an Officer	1916	Hodder & Stoughton (London)	Newspaper articles	C. N.	Collection of articles first published in The Times	
Bulldog Drummond: A Play in Four Acts	1921	Samuel French Ltd (London)	Play	Sapper	Co-published with Gerald du Maurier	
Bulldog Drummond	1929	Unpublished	Screenplay	Sapper	Writing credit; based on the 1921 play of the same name	
The Way Out	1930	Unpublished	Play	Sapper	Staged in January 1930	
The Best of O. Henry	1930	Hodder & Stoughton (London)	Short story collection	McNeile, as editor	Collection of stories by O. Henry	
Bulldog Jack	1935	Unpublished	Screenplay	McNeile	With Gerard Fairlie, J.O.C. Orton and others; written for Gaumont British	
Bulldog Drummond Hits Out	1937	Unpublished	Play	McNeile	Staged in 1937	

== Notes and references ==
Notes

== Bibliography ==
=== Books ===
- Bertens, Hans (1990). "A Society of Murderers Run on Sound Conservative Lines: The Life and Times of Sapper's Bulldog Drummond". In Bloom, Clive (ed.). Twentieth-Century Suspense: The Thriller Comes of Age. Basingstoke: The Macmillan Press. ISBN 978-0-333-47592-8.
- DelFattore, Joan (1988). "Herman Cyril McNeile (Sapper)". In Benstock, Bernard; Staley, Thomas (eds.). British Mystery Writers, 1920–1939. Detroit: Gale Research. ISBN 978-0-7876-3072-0.
- Neuburg, Victor E. (1983). The Popular Press Companion to Popular Literature. Bowling Green: Bowling Green State University Popular Press. ISBN 978-0-87972-233-3.
- Usborne, Richard (1983). Clubland Heroes: A Nostalgic Study of the Recurrent Characters in the Romantic Fiction of Dornford Yates, John Buchan and "Sapper". London: Hutchinson. ISBN 978-0-09-152821-8.
- Treadwell, Lawrence P. (2001). The Bulldog Drummond Encyclopedia. Jefferson: McFarland & Company. ISBN 978-0-7864-0769-9.

=== Journals ===
- Bourn, J. D. (October 1990). "Sapper: Creator of Bull-Dog Drummond". The Book and Magazine Collector. No. 79. UPC 977-0-9528-6001-4.
- Green, Jonathon (2004). "McNeile, (Herman) Cyril [pseud. Sapper]". Oxford Dictionary of National Biography (online ed.). Oxford University Press. doi:10.1093/ref:odnb/34810. (Subscription, Wikipedia Library access or UK public library membership required.)
- Jaillant, Lise (2011). "Sapper, Hodder & Stoughton, and the Popular Literature of the Great War". Book History. 14. Johns Hopkins University Press. ISSN 1098-7371.
