= Bulldog Drummond (disambiguation) =

Bulldog Drummond is a fictional gentleman adventurer created by H. C. McNeile.

Bulldog Drummond may also refer to:

- Bulldog Drummond (novel), a 1920 novel by McNeile under the pen name Sapper
- Bulldog Drummond (play), a 1921 play co-written by McNeile and Gerald du Maurier
- Bulldog Drummond (1922 film), a British adaptation of the novel starring Carlyle Blackwell and directed by Oscar Apfel
- Bulldog Drummond (1929 film), an American crime drama starring Ronald Colman and directed by F. Richard Jones
- Bulldog Drummond (radio program), an American series broadcast from 1941 to 1954
