= The Return of Bulldog Drummond =

1934 film by Walter Summers

- Film poster
- Directed by: Walter Summers
- Written by: Walter Summers
- Based on: The Black Gang by H.C. McNeile
- Produced by: Walter C. Mycroft
- Starring: Ralph Richardson; Ann Todd; Claud Allister
- Cinematography: Jack Parker
- Edited by: Bert Bates
- Production company: British International Pictures
- Distributed by: Wardour Films
- Release date: 19 April 1934
- Running time: 73 minutes
- Country: United Kingdom
- Language: English

The Return of Bulldog Drummond is a 1934 British thriller film directed by Walter Summers and starring Ralph Richardson, Ann Todd and Claud Allister. It was written by Summers based on the 1922 novel The Black Gang by H.C. McNeile and was the fourth film in the series of twenty-five.

== Plot ==
Captain Hugh Drummond comes out of retirement to do battle against a gang of international renegades. Carl Peterson, the head of the gang, kidnaps Drummond's wife Phyllis, and Drummond himself is captured while trying to free her. Drummond and his wife are rescued just in time, and Peterson meets his fate.

== Cast ==
- Ralph Richardson as Bulldog Drummond
- Ann Todd as Phyllis Drummond
- Joyce Kennedy as Irma Peterson
- Francis L. Sullivan as Carl Peterson
- Claud Allister as Algy Longworth
- Harold Saxon-Snell as Zadowa
- Spencer Trevor as Sir Bryan Johnstone
- Charles Mortimer as Inspector McIver
- Wallace Geoffrey as Charles Latter
- Patrick Aherne as Jerry Seymour
- Raymond Raikes as Ted Jerningham

== Reception ==
Kine Weekly wrote: "The theme is wildly fantastic, but is nevertheless good, thrilling fun, the tongue-in-the-cheek treatment of which cleverly cloaks its disregard for credulity. Ralph Richardson plays Drummond with sly nonchalance and puts over the stout-fellow act with intriguing bravado, the support is good, and the thrills are presented with serial-like extravagance and enthusiasm."

The Daily Film Renter wrote: "Crudely told ... An interesting feature of the picture is the performance of Ralph Richardson as Drummond, this screen newcomer revealing a pleasant personality, although he is hardly the popular conception of Bulldog. Francis L. Sullivan is well cast as Petersen, and Claud Allister repeats his famous Algy role. Supporting players are patchy in performance, Ann Todd being very colourless."
