= Bulldog Drummond's Peril =

1938 film by James P. Hogan

- Film poster
- Directed by: James P. Hogan
- Screenplay by: Stuart Palmer
- Based on: The Third Round; 1924 novel by Herman C. McNeile
- Starring: John Barrymore; John Howard
- Cinematography: Harry Fischbeck
- Edited by: Edward Dmytryk
- Color process: Black and white
- Production company: Paramount Pictures
- Distributed by: Paramount Pictures
- Release date: March 18, 1938
- Running time: 66 minutes
- Country: United States
- Language: English

Bulldog Drummond's Peril is a 1938 American adventure crime mystery film directed by James P. Hogan and starring John Barrymore and John Howard. The film is based on Herman C. McNeile's novel The Third Round.

== Plot ==
The intended wedding of Captain Hugh "Bulldog" Drummond to Phyllis Clavering at her villa in Switzerland is once again stopped short when someone murders the Swiss policeman who is guarding their wedding presents. The killer makes off with their prize possession, a synthetic diamond, made by a secret process by Professor Bernard Goodman, the father of their good friend Gwen Longworth. A guest, Sir Raymond Blantyre, head of the Metropolitan Diamond Syndicate, disappears at the same time, and Drummond suspects that Sir Raymond, who has the most to lose if Professor Goodman proceeds with his plans to publish his secret process, has something to do with the theft. He leaves Phyllis and returns to England.

Colonel Nielsen of Scotland Yard scoffs, as usual, at Drummond's suspicions and insists that a man as respected as Sir Raymond could not possibly be involved in such a crime. An explosion that wrecks Goodman's house, and apparently kills him, makes Drummond more positive that the diamond king has again resorted to murder to protect his business. He follows Professor Botulian, a lifelong rival of Goodman's, whom he believes to be involved in the affair. His hunt leads him to a lonely house on the outskirts of London where he finds Goodman a prisoner. Drummond's valet Tenny soon joins them as captive, but brings with him the means of escape. After Goodman is taken to safety, Drummond discovers that Phyllis, who was searching for him, is now being held by the crooks. Drummond quickly returns to the house to confront Sir Raymond and his armed confederates. Drummond begins to fight his way out, but is met by superior forces.

== Cast ==
- John Barrymore as Colonel Neilson
- John Howard as Captain Hugh C. 'Bulldog' Drummond
- Louise Campbell as Phyllis Clavering
- Reginald Denny as Algy Longworth
- E.E. Clive as Tenny
- Porter Hall as Dr. Max Botulian
- Elizabeth Patterson as Aunt Blanche Clavering
- Nydia Westman as Gwen Longworth
- Michael Brooke as Anthony Greer
- Halliwell Hobbes as Professor Bernard Goodman
- Matthew Boulton as Sir Raymond Blantyre
- Zeffie Tilbury as Mrs. Weevens
- David Clyde as Constable McThane
- Clyde Cook as Constable Sacker
- Austin Fairman as Roberts

== See also ==
- Public domain film
- List of American films of 1938
- List of films in the public domain in the United States
