= Bulldog Drummond at Bay =

Bulldog Drummond at Bay may refer to:

- Bulldog Drummond at Bay (novel), a 1935 novel by Herman Cyril McNeile
- Bulldog Drummond at Bay (1937 film)
- Bulldog Drummond at Bay (1947 film)
