= The Challenge (1948 film) =

1948 film by Jean Yarbrough

- Directed by: Jean Yarbrough
- Screenplay by: Frank Gruber; Irving Elman
- Based on: Challenge; 1935 novel by H. C. McNeile
- Produced by: Bernard Small; Edward Small
- Starring: Tom Conway; John Newland; June Vincent
- Cinematography: George Robinson
- Edited by: Fred R. Feitshans Jr.
- Music by: Milton Rosen
- Production company: Reliance Pictures
- Distributed by: 20th Century Fox
- Release date: April 2, 1948
- Running time: 68 minutes
- Country: United States
- Language: English
- Budget: $150,000
- Box office: $400,000 (worldwide)

The Challenge is a 1948 American mystery film starring Tom Conway as Bulldog Drummond.

== Plot ==
Vivian Bailey travels with Cliff Sonnenberg to visit his uncle, unaware that Capt. Sonnenberg has been flung from a cliff to his death. After a model of a schooner bought by Bulldog Drummond's friend Algy leads to a pursuit of a sunken treasure, Drummond helps bring the co-conspirators, including the captain's housekeeper Kitty Fyffe, to justice.

== Cast ==
- Tom Conway as Bulldog Drummond
- June Vincent as Vivian Bailey
- John Newland as Algy
- Eily Malyon as Kitty
- Richard Wyler as Cliff
- Houseley Stevenson as Capt. Sonnenberg
