= Temple Tower =

1930 film by Donald Gallaher

- Lobby card
- Directed by: Donald Gallaher
- Written by: Llewellyn Hughes
- Based on: Temple Tower by Herman C. McNeile
- Produced by: William Fox
- Starring: Kenneth MacKenna; Marceline Day; Peter Gawthorne
- Cinematography: Charles G. Clarke
- Edited by: Clyde Carruth
- Music by: George Lipschultz
- Production company: Fox Film Corporation
- Distributed by: Fox Film Corporation
- Release date: April 13, 1930
- Running time: 58 minutes
- Country: United States
- Language: English

Temple Tower is a 1930 American pre-Code crime film directed by Donald Gallaher and starring Kenneth MacKenna, Marceline Day. and Peter Gawthorne.

The film depicts the character of Bulldog Drummond, a British adventurer, and is based on the 1929 novel Temple Tower by Herman Cyril McNeile. It is sandwiched between more celebrated portrayals of the character by Ronald Colman in two United Artists films, Bulldog Drummond and Bulldog Drummond Strikes Back.

Although described as lost, the film still survives, with copies held in the UCLA Archives.

== Plot ==
Bulldog Drummond goes up against a gang of jewel thieves led by Benjamin Blackton, and also a masked stranger who wants unhallowed revenge upon them.

== Cast ==
- Kenneth MacKenna as Bulldog Drummond
- Marceline Day as Patricia Verney
- Henry B. Walthall as Blackton
- Cyril Chadwick as Peter Darrell
- Peter Gawthorne as Marrhews
- Ivan Linow as Gaspard
- Frank Lanning as The Nightingale
- Yorke Sherwood as Constable Muggins

== Bibliography ==
- Backer. Ron. Mystery Movie Series of 1930s Hollywood. McFarland, 2012.
