= The Third Round =

The Third Round may refer to:

- The Third Round (novel), a 1924 Bulldog Drummond novel
- The Third Round (film), a 1925 silent film based on the novel
