= Bulldog Drummond Strikes Back (1934 film) =

1934 film by Roy Del Ruth

- Directed by: Roy Del Ruth
- Written by: Nunnally Johnson; Henry Lehrman
- Based on: Bulldog Drummond Strikes Back; 1933 novel by Herman C. McNeile
- Produced by: Darryl F. Zanuck
- Starring: Ronald Colman; Loretta Young; C. Aubrey Smith; Charles Butterworth
- Cinematography: J. Peverell Marley
- Edited by: Allen McNeil
- Music by: Alfred Newman
- Production company: Twentieth Century Pictures
- Distributed by: United Artists
- Release date: August 15, 1934
- Running time: 83 mins
- Country: United States
- Language: English

Bulldog Drummond Strikes Back is a 1934 American comedy-mystery-adventure film directed by Roy Del Ruth. The film stars Ronald Colman and Loretta Young. It was a loose sequel to the 1929 film Bulldog Drummond which had also starred Colman.

== Plot ==
Bulldog Drummond's partner Algy is set to wed. Bulldog attends the wedding but on his return home in the deep foggy night he wanders into an old mansion of Prince Achmed in search of a telephone. To his shock he finds the corpse of an old man. Bodies keep disappearing as Drummond attempts to contact the authorities, including neighbour Captain Nielsen. But a woman is on the case, Lola, who is the daughter of the dead man.

== Cast ==
- Ronald Colman as Capt. Hugh (Bulldog) Drummond
- Loretta Young as Lola Field
- C. Aubrey Smith as Captain Reginald Neilsen a.k.a. Colonel
- Charles Butterworth as Algy a.k.a. Mousey
- Una Merkel as Gwen
- Warner Oland as Prince Achmed
- E.E. Clive as London Bobbie
- Mischa Auer as Hassan
- Douglas Gerrard as Parker, Drummond's Valet
- Ethel Griffies as Mrs. Field
- Halliwell Hobbes as Bobby
- Arthur Hohl as Dr. Sothern
- George Regas as Singh
- Olaf Hytten as Hotel Clerk (uncredited)
- Ronnie Coleman as extra
- Billy Bevan as Man In Hotel
- H. N. Clugston as Mr. Field
- Halliwell Hobbes as Second Bobbie

== See also ==
- List of American films of 1934
- Bulldog Drummond
