= Bulldog Drummond =

Fictional character by H. C. McNeile

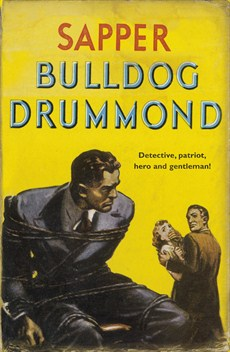
First edition cover of Bulldog Drummond

Hugh "Bulldog" Drummond is a fictional character, created by H. C. McNeile and published under his pen name "Sapper". Following McNeile's death in 1937, the novels were continued by Gerard Fairlie. Drummond is a First World War veteran who, fed up with his sedate lifestyle, advertises looking for excitement, and becomes a gentleman adventurer. The character has appeared in novels, short stories, on the stage, in films, on radio and television, and in graphic novels.

After an unsuccessful one-off appearance as a policeman in The Strand Magazine, the character was reworked by McNeile into a gentleman adventurer for his 1920 novel Bulldog Drummond. McNeile went on to write ten Drummond novels, four short stories, four stage plays and a screenplay before his death in 1937. The stories were continued by his friend Gerard Fairlie between 1938 and 1954.

Brutalised by his experiences in the trenches and bored with his post-war lifestyle, Drummond publishes an advertisement looking for adventure. He soon finds himself embroiled in a series of exploits, many of which involve Carl Peterson—who becomes his nemesis—and Peterson's mistress, the femme fatale Irma. After his first adventure, Drummond marries his client, Phyllis Benton. In later episodes, Benton becomes involved in Drummond's exploits, often as the victim of kidnapping by Drummond's enemies.

In 1921 an adaptation of the first novel was staged in London, with Gerald du Maurier playing the role of Drummond; the play was further adapted for the 1922 silent film Bulldog Drummond, with Carlyle Blackwell in the lead role. Several other Drummond films followed, either based on McNeile's stories or with unique storylines.

== Fictional biography ==
"Demobilised officer, ... finding peace incredibly tedious, would welcome diversion. Legitimate, if possible; but crime, if of a comparatively humorous description, no objection. Excitement essential."

— Advertisement placed in The Times by Drummond in Bulldog Drummond

The Bulldog Drummond stories of H. C. McNeile follow Captain Hugh "Bulldog" Drummond, DSO, MC. Drummond is a member of "the Breed", a class of Englishman who were patriotic, loyal and "physically and morally intrepid". Drummond is a wealthy gentleman, formerly an officer in the fictional "Royal Loamshire Regiment", who, after the First World War, spends his new-found leisure time looking for adventure. McNeile first wrote the Drummond character as a detective for a short story in The Strand Magazine, but the portrayal was not successful and was changed for the novel Bull-dog Drummond, which was a thriller. (Note: The novel was first published as Bull-Dog Drummond, with a hyphen, but was later changed to Bulldog.) The character was an amalgam of McNeile's friend Gerard Fairlie, and his idea of an English gentleman, although writer J.D. Bourn disputes Fairlie's claim to be a model for the character, noting that "he was still at school when Sapper created his ... hero". Drummond also had roots in the literary characters Sherlock Holmes, Sexton Blake, Richard Hannay and The Scarlet Pimpernel.

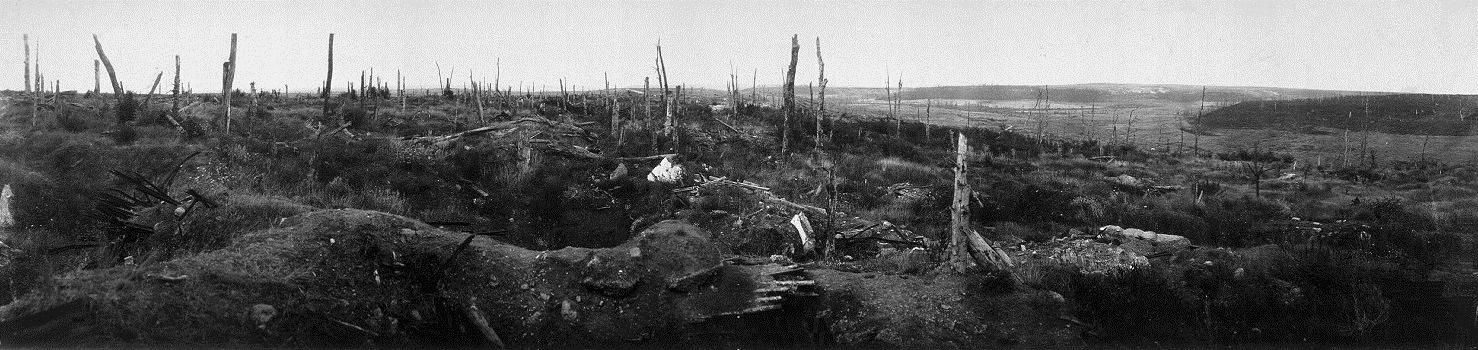
No man's land, where Drummond honed the skills he later used during his exploits

Drummond's wartime experience had given him a series of abilities akin to that of a hunter: stealth—"he could move over ground without a single blade of grass rustling"—and the ability to incapacitate others—"he could kill a man with his bare hands in a second". During his time on the Western Front he would take himself on solitary raids through no man's land. Drummond was also proficient in jujutsu and boxing, was a crack shot, played cricket for the Free Foresters, and was an excellent poker player. In addition to Drummond's physical attributes is his common sense, which allows him to equal and beat his opponents, even if they have a superior intellect.

Drummond is characterised as large, very strong, physically unattractive and an "apparently brainless hunk of a man", He is 6 feet (1.8 m) tall, weighs around 14 stone (200 lb; 89 kg), and has a "cheerful type of ugliness which inspires immediate confidence in its owner". Throughout his exploits, Drummond is joined by several of his ex-army friends and colleagues, including Algy Longworth (who would appear in many of the films, as Drummond's sidekick), MC; Toby Sinclair, VC; (Note: The VC is "a good one", according to Drummond.) Peter Darrell and Ted Jerningham. Drummond's ex-batman from his military days, James Denny, runs Drummond's flat on Half-Moon Street in Mayfair, London, along with Mrs Denny. (Denny appeared as Drummond's sidekick in the radio series, a version of the character named Tenny appeared in the films) Drummond is a gentleman with a private income; he is also construed as "a brutalized ex-officer whose thirst for excitement is also an attempt to reenact [sic] the war", although the character was later described by Cecil Day-Lewis, author of gentleman detective Nigel Strangeways, as an "unspeakable public school bully".

The novel Bulldog Drummond begins when Drummond places an advertisement in a newspaper looking for adventure to lift the ennui of his life in post-war London. The response comes from Phyllis Benton, who is concerned for the health and well-being of her father, over whom Henry Lakington and Carl Peterson have a hold. At the end of the novel Drummond and Phyllis marry, and remain married throughout the course of the McNeile and Fairlie series of books, in contrast to the films, which generally portray Drummond as unmarried. Phyllis becomes integral to the plot of some of the novels: she is kidnapped by Irma Peterson in several stories, including The Black Gang and The Female of the Species.

In the matter of his personal tastes, Drummond is a member of the fictional Junior Sports Club, a gentleman's club on St. James's Square, London. His preferred drink is beer although he also enjoys drinking martinis and is knowledgeable about wines. Drummond owns both a Rolls-Royce and a Bentley.

Although Drummond's actions are intended to maintain the conservative status quo of Britain, academic Hans Bertens considers that instead, he comes across as "a murderous exponent of a fierce competitive individualism".

=== Carl and Irma Peterson ===
The first four books deal with Drummond against Carl Peterson, who becomes Drummond's arch-enemy. Peterson is also a master of disguise and uses several aliases. Peterson is killed in the fourth book, The Final Count, although Fairlie brings him back for his final novel, The Return of the Black Gang. Drummond forms a grudging respect for Peterson, and offers an honourable duel to the death at the end of The Third Round, instead of the usual summary justice that normally befalls members of Peterson's gang. The writer Richard Usborne sees the mass-murdering terrorist Peterson as "quite a sympathetic character. Almost, in fact, a hero", and wrote that "authors ... fall in love with their big villains ... Sapper came to love Carl Peterson dearly, and so did Drummond".

The title of the fifth Drummond book, The Female of the Species refers to Rudyard Kipling's line "the female of the species is more deadly than the male". Irma is described by Jonathon Green as "the slinky epitome of a twenties 'vamp'", and by Lawrence Treadwell as dark, sexy and from an oriental background, "a true femme fatale". After Carl Peterson's death in The Final Count, Irma swears revenge on Drummond and kidnaps his wife—whom he had met in Bulldog Drummond—with the intent of killing him in the ensuing chase. Irma Peterson appears in six of McNeile's books, and in a further five by Fairlie. (Note: The six Drummond novels with Irma Peterson are: Bulldog Drummond (1920), The Black Gang (1922), The Third Round (1924), The Final Count (1926), The Female of the Species (1928) and The Return of Bulldog Drummond (1932).)

== Works ==
=== Novels ===
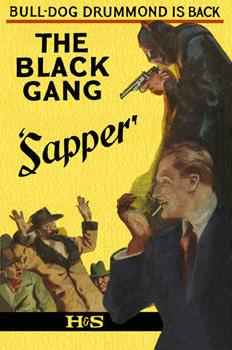
Cover of The Black Gang, the second Drummond novel

All were published through Hodder & Stoughton.

Title	Author	Date	Length (first edition)	Refs.
Bull-Dog Drummond	H. C. McNeile	1920	320 pp	
The Black Gang	H. C. McNeile	1922	318 pp	
The Third Round	H. C. McNeile	1924	320 pp	
The Final Count	H. C. McNeile	1926	319 pp	
The Female of the Species	H. C. McNeile	1928	312 pp	
Temple Tower	H. C. McNeile	1929	320 pp	
The Return of Bulldog Drummond	H. C. McNeile	1932	316 pp	
Knock-Out	H. C. McNeile	1933	317 pp	
Bulldog Drummond at Bay	H. C. McNeile	1935	310 pp	
Challenge	H. C. McNeile	1937	311 pp	
Bulldog Drummond on Dartmoor	Gerard Fairlie	1938	254 pp	
Bulldog Drummond Attacks	Gerard Fairlie	1939	287 pp	
Captain Bulldog Drummond	Gerard Fairlie	1945	256 pp	
Bulldog Drummond Stands Fast	Gerard Fairlie	1947	319 pp	
Hands Off Bulldog Drummond	Gerard Fairlie	1949	271 pp	
Calling Bulldog Drummond	Gerard Fairlie	1951	255 pp	
The Return of the Black Gang	Gerard Fairlie	1954	192 pp	
Deadlier Than the Male	H. R. F. Keating, writing as "Henry Reymond" (Note: From the screenplay by Jimmy Sangster, David Osborne, and Liz Charles-Williams.)	1967	192 pp	
Some Girls Do	H. R. F. Keating writing as "Henry Reymond" (Note: From the screenplay by David Osborne and Liz Charles-Williams.)	1969	192 pp	

Drummond has also appeared in other works. In 1983 Jack Smithers wrote the spoof Combined Forces, (Note: Subtitled being the latter-day adventures of Maj-Gen Sir Richard Hannay, Captain Hugh 'Bulldog' Drummond and Berry and Co.) and in 1990 Kim Newman—under the name Jack Yeovil—wrote the short story "Pitbull Brittan", which features Drummond.

=== Short stories ===
These short stories are all by McNeile, and are collected in the 1984 publication 'Sapper' The Best Short Stories edited by Jack Adrian.

Title	Date	Earliest publication	Refs.
"The Mystery Tour"	February 1937	The Strand Magazine	
"The Lonely Inn"	August 1937	The Strand Magazine	
"The Oriental Mind"	October 1937	The Strand Magazine	
"Wheels Within Wheels"	November 1937	The Strand Magazine	
"Thirteen Lead Soldiers"	December 1937	The Strand Magazine	

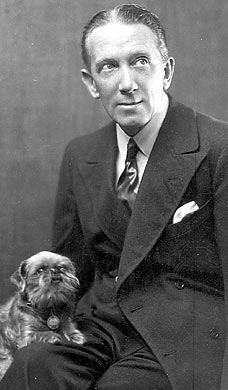
Gerald du Maurier, who first portrayed Drummond on stage in 1921

=== Stage ===
McNeile and Gerald du Maurier adapted the first novel, for the stage; Bulldog Drummond was shown at Wyndham's Theatre during the 1921–22 season. Du Maurier played the title role in a run of 428 performances. Du Maurier again played the role on 8 November 1932 in a special charity performance at the Royal Adelphi Theatre attended by King George V. The play also ran in New York during the same season, with A. E. Matthews as Drummond. McNeile also wrote The Way Out, which was staged at the Comedy Theatre, London in January 1930 with Ian Hunter as Drummond. A third Drummond play, Bulldog Drummond Hits Out, was co-written by McNeile and Fairlie. It went on a tour of the UK in 1937 with Henry Edwards as Drummond, and opened on 21 December 1937 at the Savoy Theatre, London, where it had a short run. Fairlie later turned the storyline into the novel Bulldog Drummond on Dartmoor, published in 1938.

In 1974 the play Bullshot Crummond, by Ron House, was staged with Alan Shearman as Crummond. The play was subsequently made into the 1983 film Bullshot.

=== Film ===
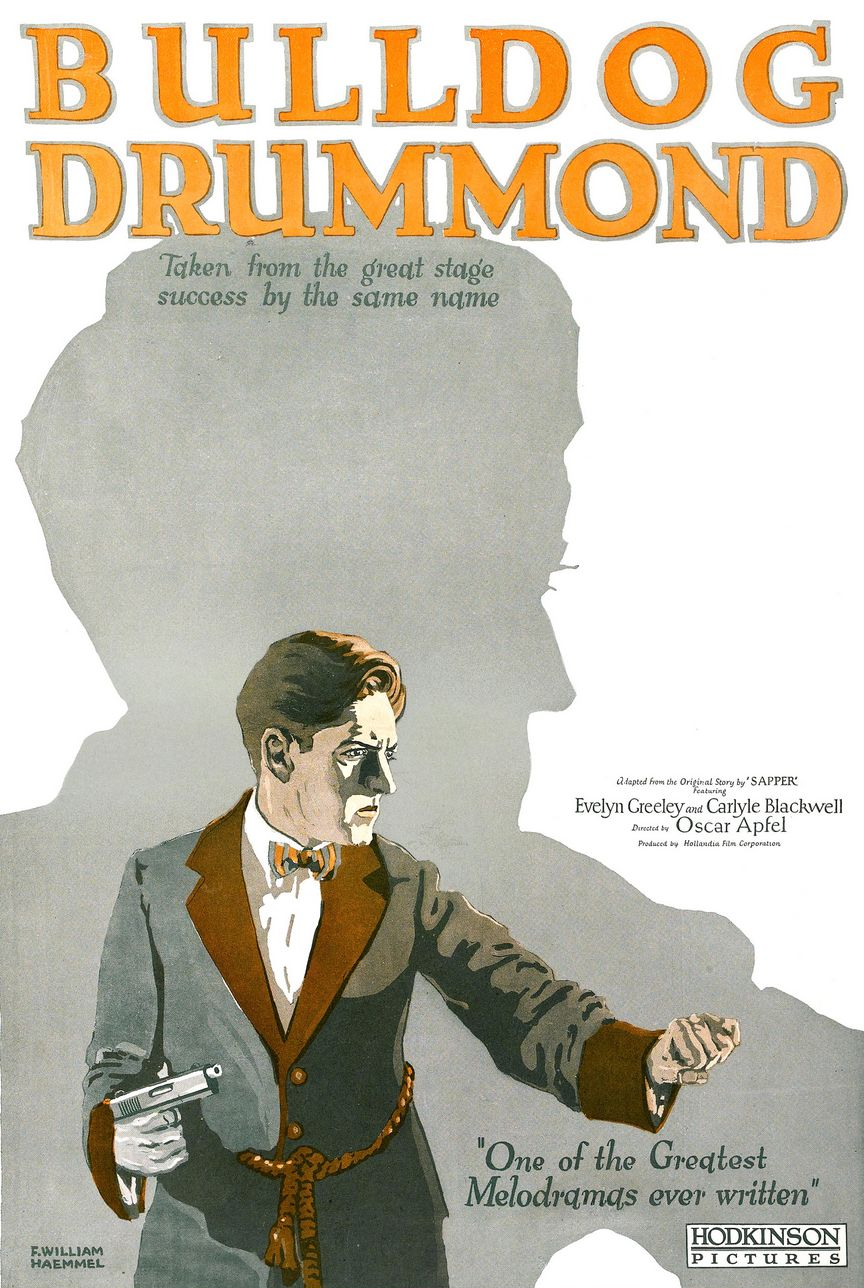
Poster for the 1922 film Bulldog Drummond, based on McNeile's play of the same name

==== Sound films ====
The most important of the Bulldog Drummond pictures was the first talking-picture adaptation of the McNeile works, Bulldog Drummond (1929), starring Ronald Colman in his first sound film. This was a major motion picture and was well received. From the Screenland review: "Bulldog Drummond is a good, old-fashioned wow of a motion picture. If splendid acting, intelligent direction, expert photography, and interesting camera angles mean anything – and say, they do! – then Bulldog Drummond is one of the best motion pictures of this or any other season."

==== The Bulldog Drummond series ====
Motion Picture Herald explained: "When Philo Vance, Perry Mason, Charlie Chan, Oscar Piper, Hildegarde Withers et al. go to work, there's always an assurance of action, excitement, thrills, mystery, and romance. There's not as many pictures produced featuring the redoubtable Bulldog Drummond as starring the other notable detectives, but when one comes along, there is reason for similar expectancy. Those elements are what Paramount is counting upon." The columnist for Silver Screen wrote, "Our favorite detective does a comeback. And that's good news for all the mystery story lovers who like to have their sleuthing done with a bit of British finesse."

The casting varied in the first few features. Up-and-coming juvenile Ray Milland was chosen for the first film, Bulldog Drummond's Romance (released as Bulldog Drummond Escapes in 1937), with Sir Guy Standing as Inspector Nielson. The story treatment, "Bulldog Drummond Meets a Lady", was purchased by Paramount in November 1936.

John Barrymore, a major star of stage and screen, was under contract to Paramount in the late 1930s. He was assigned to the Bulldog Drummond series as Inspector Nielson, and given his professional standing he was awarded top billing in the films. By this time in his career, Barrymore did not memorise the routine dialogue in his scripts, and would simply read his lines from cue cards. His first, Bulldog Drummond Comes Back (1937), allowed the actor to improvise by adopting outrageous disguises and makeups, and his enthusiasm was obvious. Reviewer Eileen Creelman noted Barrymore's broad performance amid the headlong action: "There's a wild-eyed new film at the New Criterion, one more like a good old-fashioned serial than a John Barrymore drama." Tom Pryor of the New York Times attended the same screening: "The picture is the pleasantest the Criterion has had in several weeks." Unfortunately, Barrymore's next two Drummonds gave Barrymore little to do except to sputter explosively and register exasperation with Drummond. John Mosher of The New Yorker commented on the actor's rushed participation: "John Barrymore seems a little too incidental and casual in Bulldog Drummond's Revenge." Barrymore left the series in 1938, but the Boxoffice reviewer was satisfied: "By far the best of the current Bulldog Drummond series, this films sets an entertainment standard reminiscent of the old cycle which starred Ronald Colman."

=== The Bulldog Drummond films ===
Title	Release	Drummond	Director	Distributor	Refs.
Bulldog Drummond	1922	Carlyle Blackwell	Oscar Apfel	Hodkinson	
The Third Round	1925	Jack Buchanan	Sidney Morgan		
Captain Swagger	1928	Rod La Rocque	Edward H. Griffith	Pathe Exchange	source
Bulldog Drummond	1929	Ronald Colman	F. Richard Jones	United Artists	
Temple Tower	1930	Kenneth MacKenna	Donald Gallaher	Fox Film Corporation	
The Return of Bulldog Drummond	1934	Ralph Richardson	Walter Summers	Wardour Films	
Bulldog Drummond Strikes Back	1934	Ronald Colman	Roy Del Ruth	United Artists	
Bulldog Jack (Note: Screenplay was by McNeile, Fairlie, J.O.C. Orton and Sidney Gilliat.)	1935	Atholl Fleming	Walter Forde	Gaumont British	
Bulldog Drummond Escapes	1937	Ray Milland	James P. Hogan	Paramount Pictures	
Bulldog Drummond at Bay	1937	John Lodge	Norman Lee	Wardour Films	
Bulldog Drummond Comes Back	1937	John Howard	Louis King	Paramount Pictures	
Bulldog Drummond's Revenge	1937	John Howard	Louis King	Paramount Pictures	
Bulldog Drummond's Peril	1938	John Howard	James P. Hogan	Paramount Pictures	
Bulldog Drummond in Africa	1938	John Howard	Louis King	Paramount Pictures	
Arrest Bulldog Drummond	1938	John Howard	James P. Hogan	Paramount Pictures	
Bulldog Drummond's Secret Police	1939	John Howard	James P. Hogan	Paramount Pictures	
Bulldog Drummond's Bride	1939	John Howard	James P. Hogan	Paramount Pictures	
Bulldog Drummond at Bay	1947	Ron Randell	Sidney Salkow	Columbia Pictures	
Bulldog Drummond Strikes Back	1947	Ron Randell	Roy Del Ruth	Columbia Pictures	
The Challenge	1948	Tom Conway	Jean Yarbrough	20th Century-Fox	
13 Lead Soldiers	1948	Tom Conway	Frank McDonald	20th Century-Fox	
Calling Bulldog Drummond	1951	Walter Pidgeon	Victor Saville	MGM	
Deadlier Than the Male	1967	Richard Johnson	Ralph Thomas	The Rank Organisation	
Some Girls Do	1969	Richard Johnson	Ralph Thomas	The Rank Organisation	

In 1933 Alfred Hitchcock was set to direct a Bulldog Drummond film with a screenplay by Charles Bennett entitled Bulldog Drummond's Baby. The rights to the character of Drummond were then held by British International Pictures, who would not sell the rights to use the characters for Bennett's screenplay. Bennett and Hitchcock turned the film into The Man Who Knew Too Much without Drummond.

=== Radio ===
A Bulldog Drummond radio series ran on the Mutual Broadcasting System from 13 April 1941 to 12 January 1949. An attempt was made at a revival between 3 January and 28 March 1954. Drummond was initially portrayed by George Coulouris, before being taken over by Santos Ortega and Ned Wever after 1942; Cedric Hardwicke took over in 1954.

=== Television ===
A 30-minute episode of Douglas Fairbanks Presents featured Drummond in "The Ludlow Affair", first broadcast on UK television on 16 December 1956. Drummond was played by Robert Beatty; he was aided by Kelly, played by Michael Ripper. A 1973 BBC documentary Omnibus, "The British Hero", featured Christopher Cazenove playing Drummond, as well as a number of other such heroic characters, including Richard Hannay, Beau Geste and James Bond.

=== Graphic novels ===
Adaptations of the first and fourth novels appeared in Super Detective Library #3 and #13 respectively. In 2004 Moonstone Books released a Bulldog Drummond comic book written by William Messner-Loebs and illustrated by Brett Barkley, while in The League of Extraordinary Gentlemen: Black Dossier, written by Alan Moore and illustrated by Kevin O'Neill, a thinly disguised, elderly version of Drummond, called "Hugo Drummond", is one of the three Secret Service agents tasked to hunt down the heroes of the piece.

== Reception ==
The Drummond series proved popular with contemporary audiences, with Bulldog Drummond selling 396,302 copies between 1920 and 1939, exceeding the 100,000-copy benchmark for "best-sellers". At his peak in the 1920s, McNeile was the highest-paid short-story writer in the world, and it was estimated that in the last five years of his life he was earning around £10,000 a year (approximately equivalent to £588,966 in 2025); the Daily Mirror estimated that during his writing career he had earned £85,000.

When reviewing Bulldog Drummond Strikes Back (Note: The novel was first published in the UK under the title Knock-Out and had been renamed Bulldog Drummond Strikes Back for the US market.) for The New York Times, the critic observed that "if you like a good knock-down-and-drag-out yarn with excitement and violence on nearly every page, you can't go wrong on Bulldog Drummond"; for the novel Bulldog Drummond at Bay, the reviewer considered that "as a piece of fictional melodrama, the book is first rate". In the British market, The Times Literary Supplement also characterised McNeile as a mass-market thriller writer, which contrasted with its consideration of his earlier works.

Throughout the Drummond stories, much of the language used by McNeile's characters relating to ethnic minorities or Jews is considered by the academic Joan DelFattore to be "intensely conservative by modern standards"; Green observes that while the characters of other contemporary writers, such as Agatha Christie, "exhibit the inevitable xenophobia and anti-semitism of the period, McNeile's go far beyond the 'polite' norms". J.D. Bourn considers his language to be "rather distasteful", while the academic Michael Denning observed that "Drummond is a bundle of chauvinisms, hating Jews, Germans, and most other foreigners". The author and publisher Ion Trewin comments that for the readers of the 1920s and '30s, McNeile was seen at the time as "simply an upstanding Tory who spoke for many of his countrymen".

== Influence ==
Drummond later became a model for other literary characters created in the 1940s and 1950s: W. E. Johns used McNeile's work as a model for his character Biggles, while Ian Fleming stated that James Bond was "Sapper from the waist up and Mickey Spillane below".

== Notes and references ==
=== Sources ===
- Bertens, Hans (1990). "A Society of Murderers Run on Sound Conservative Lines: The Life and Times of Sapper's Bulldog Drummond". In Bloom, Clive (ed.). Twentieth-Century Suspense: The Thriller Comes of Age. Basingstoke: The Macmillan Press. ISBN 978-0-333-47592-8.
- Bourn, J. D. (October 1990). "Sapper: Creator of Bull-Dog Drummond". The Book and Magazine Collector (79). Diamond Publishing Group.
- DelFattore, Joan (1988). "Herman Cyril McNeile (Sapper)". In Benstock, Bernard; Staley, Thomas (eds.). British Mystery Writers, 1920–1939. Detroit: Gale Research. ISBN 978-0-7876-3072-0.
- Denning, Michael (1987). Cover Stories: Narrative and Ideology in the British Spy Thriller. London: Routledge & K. Paul. ISBN 978-0-7100-9642-5.
- Dunning, John (1998). On the Air:The Encyclopedia of Old-Time Radio. Oxford: Oxford University Press. ISBN 978-0-19-984045-8.
- Green, Jonathon (2004). "McNeile, (Herman) Cyril [pseud. Sapper]". Oxford Dictionary of National Biography (online ed.). Oxford University Press. doi:10.1093/ref:odnb/34810. (Subscription, Wikipedia Library access or UK public library membership required.)
- Hardy, Phil, ed. (1997). The BFI Companion to Crime. London: Continuum. ISBN 978-0-304-33215-1.
- Jaillant, Lise (2011). "Sapper, Hodder & Stoughton, and the Popular Literature of the Great War". Book History. 14. Johns Hopkins University Press. ISSN 1098-7371.
- Johns, Eric (1974). British Theatre Review. Eastbourne: Vance-Offord Publications. ISBN 0-903931-07-9.
- McNeile, H. C. (1920). Bull-Dog Drummond: The Adventures of a Demobilised Officer Who Found Peace Dull. London: Hodder & Stoughton. OCLC 562338129.
- McNeile, H.C.; Trewin, Ion (1983). The Black Gang. London: Dent. ISBN 978-0-460-02245-3.
- Meyer, Jessica (2007). "The Tuition of Manhood: Sapper's War Stories and the Literature of the War". In Hammond, Mary; Towheed, Shafquat (eds.). Publishing in the First World War: Essays in Book History. Basingstoke: Palgrave Macmillan. ISBN 978-0-230-50076-1.
- Panek, LeRoy (1981). The Special Branch: The British Spy Novel, 1890–1980. Popular Press. ISBN 978-0-87972-178-7.
- Sutherland, John (2012). Lives of the Novelists. New Haven: Yale University Press. ISBN 978-0-300-18243-9.
- Treadwell, Lawrence P. (2001). The Bulldog Drummond Encyclopedia. Jefferson: McFarland & Company. ISBN 978-0-7864-0769-9.
- Usborne, Richard (1983). Clubland Heroes: A Nostalgic Study of the Recurrent Characters in the Romantic Fiction of Dornford Yates, John Buchan and "Sapper". London: Hutchinson. ISBN 978-0-09-152821-8.
- Watson, Colin (1971). Snobbery With Violence: English Crime Stories and their Audience. London: Eyre Methuen. ISBN 0-413-46570-5.
