= Bulldog Drummond Comes Back =

1937 film by Louis King

- DVD cover
- Directed by: Louis King
- Screenplay by: Edward T. Lowe Jr.
- Based on: The Female of the Species; 1928 novel by Herman C. McNeile
- Produced by: Stuart Walker; Adolph Zukor
- Starring: John Barrymore; John Howard; Louise Campbell
- Cinematography: William C. Mellor
- Edited by: James Smith
- Production company: Paramount Pictures
- Distributed by: Paramount Pictures
- Release date: September 24, 1937
- Running time: 64 minutes
- Country: United States
- Language: English

Bulldog Drummond Comes Back is a 1937 American mystery thriller film directed by Louis King and starring John Howard as the English adventurer Bulldog Drummond. John Barrymore plays Drummond's friend Colonel Nielsen and is actually Top-billed in the picture. The supporting cast includes Drummond series regular Louise Campbell, Reginald Denny, E.E. Clive, and J. Carrol Naish. It was produced and distributed by Paramount Pictures, and is the second in the studio's series following Bulldog Drummond Escapes which had starred Ray Milland.

== Plot ==
Phyllis Clavering, the girlfriend of Captain Drummond, is kidnapped. Murderer Mikhail Valdin and his sister, Irena Soldanis, seek revenge for the death of her husband, sent to the gallows a year ago through Drummond's actions. Though Valdin could shoot Drummond, he informs the captain that it would be too quick. Drummond and his friend Colonel Nielsen are instead given a series of riddles to solve.

== Cast ==
- John Barrymore as Colonel Nielson
- John Howard as Captain Hugh Bulldog Drummond
- Louise Campbell as Phyllis Clavering
- Reginald Denny as Algy Longworth
- E.E. Clive as Tenny
- J. Carrol Naish as Mikhail Valdin
- Helen Freeman as Irena Soldanis
- Zeffie Tilbury as Zeffie
- John Sutton as Sanger
- Phyllis Barry as Hortense
- Rita Page as Barmaid
- John Rogers as Blanton
- Phyllis Barry as Hortense - Barmaid
- Otto Fries as Sanghil Wun
- Kay Deslys as Pub Singer
- Frank Baker as Bobby
- Forrester Harvey as Barman
- Colin Kenny as Policeman

== Bibliography ==
- Backer, Ron. Mystery Movie Series of 1930s Hollywood. McFarland, 2012.
