= Bulldog Drummond at Bay (1937 film) =

1937 British film by Norman Lee

- Film poster
- Directed by: Norman Lee
- Screenplay by: Patrick Kirwan; James Parrish
- Based on: Bulldog Drummond at Bay; 1935 novel by Herman C. McNeile
- Produced by: Walter C. Mycroft
- Starring: John Lodge; Dorothy Mackaill; Claud Allister
- Cinematography: Walter J. Harvey
- Edited by: James Corbett
- Production company: Associated British Picture Corporation
- Distributed by: Wardour Films; Republic Pictures
- Release date: 5 March 1937
- Running time: 78 minutes
- Country: United Kingdom
- Language: English

Bulldog Drummond at Bay is a 1937 British mystery film directed by Norman Lee and starring John Lodge, Dorothy Mackaill and Claud Allister. It was written by Patrick Kirwan and James Parrish based on the 1935 novel of the same name by Herman C. McNeile. It was made at Elstree Studios.

== Plot ==
Bulldog Drummond goes up against a gang of foreign agents who are members of a British pacifist organisation called "The Key". The agents kidnap an inventor to steal the plans for a top-secret robot aircraft.

== Cast ==
- John Lodge as Hugh Drummond
- Dorothy Mackaill as Doris Thompson
- Victor Jory as Gregoroff
- Claud Allister as Algy Longworth
- Richard Bird as Caldwell
- Hugh Miller as Ivan Kalinsky
- Leslie Perrins as Maj. Grayson
- Brian Buchel as Meredith
- Jim Gérald as Veight
- Maire O'Neill as Norah, the housekeeper
- Annie Esmond as Mrs. Caldwell
- Frank Cochrane as Dr. Belfrus
- William Dewhurst as Reginald Portside
- Wilfrid Hyde-White as Conrad (uncredited)

== Reception ==
The Monthly Film Bulletin wrote: "The usual story elements – distressed maiden, bewildered inventor, and determined villain – form the framework for a series of incidents that are anything but usual. All the variations of cinema action are present, from the poison gas chamber to the castle fire, and the director's commendable emphasis on pure speed of incident makes this an excellent British thriller. There is little attempt on the part of the actors to create memorable characters, and this subordination of personality to incident helps, not hinders, a first-rate thriller."

Film Weekly wrote: "The trouble is that the whole thing is a little too exciting: there is practically nothing else in the picture but helter-skelter thrills, explosions, fires and chases. There is very little reason behind the most dramatic incidents; and the villains are of that engaging type who are satisfied with nothing less than the destruction of all who stand in their path. A little more characterisation and attention to plausibility would have made all the difference to this picture."

Kine Weekly wrote: "Here is thick-ear melodrama with a vengeance, a picture which rides roughshod over story plausibility and clarity in its hot pursuit of thrills, and, thanks to enthusiastic team work and colourful stagecraft, makes the grade in the hearty manner of the serial. The intelligentsia is not, of course, its main objective, but industrial and provincial houses are, and it can be confidently relied upon to keep the unsophisticated on the edge of their seats."

Harrison's Reports also offered a negative review and wrote, "The plot is wildly melodramatic and so far-fetched that some of the situations, intended to thrill one, will prove ludicrous."Motion Picture Herald wrote, "The material is there for a rousing mystery melodrama, but the finished product is uneven and lacks suspense."
