= The Return of Bulldog Drummond (novel) =

1932 novel by H. C. McNeile

- First edition cover of The Return of Bulldog Drummond
- Author: H. C. McNeile (as Sapper)
- Language: English
- Series: Bulldog Drummond
- Genre: Crime fiction
- Publisher: Hodder and Stoughton
- Publication date: 1932
- Publication place: United Kingdom
- Media type: Print (Hardcover)
- Pages: 316pp
- OCLC: 20579670
- Preceded by: Temple Tower
- Followed by: Knock-Out

The Return of Bulldog Drummond was the seventh Bulldog Drummond novel. It was published in 1932 and written by H. C. McNeile under the pen name Sapper.

It was serialised in The Strand Magazine from August 1931 to March 1932 under the title The Mystery of the Studio.

== Bibliography ==
- Treadwell, Lawrence P. (2001). The Bulldog Drummond Encyclopedia. Jefferson: McFarland & Company. ISBN 978-0-7864-0769-9.
