= Joan DelFattore =

Joan DelFattore (born 1946) is a professor emerita of English and legal studies at the University of Delaware. She is known for her advocacy of academic freedom and for her 1992 book What Johnny Shouldn't Read: Textbook Censorship in America; the book won the American Library Association's Eli M. Oboler Memorial Award (which is awarded for "the best published work in the area of intellectual freedom" ). She has also received awards from the Spencer Foundation, the Gustavus Myers Center, the American Educational Research Association, and the Delaware state affiliate of the American Civil Liberties Union.

== Biography ==
Born in Newark, New Jersey, Joan DelFattore graduated in 1970 with a B.A. from Caldwell College (renamed in 2014 Caldwell University) and in 1976 with an M.A. from St. Bonaventure University. At Pennsylvania State University, she graduated in 1978 with an M.S. in clinical psychology and in 1979 with a Ph.D. in English. In 2011, as president of the Delaware chapter of the American Association of University Professors, she pointed out that the First Amendment to the U.S. Constitution does not necessarily protect the freedom of speech of professors at public institutions and that, instead of relying on the First Amendment, professors at public institutions should consider "defining academic freedom as a professional standard embodied in university policies." She was for more than thirty years a professor at the University of Delaware, During her academic career, she published three books with Yale University Press and many articles about freedom of speech. In 2014, she became professor emerita and established a program called "Writing as Healing" at Delaware's Christiana Care Health System. In the program, she taught techniques for reducing stress using writing by the program's participants.

In 2011, DelFattore was diagnosed with advanced gallbladder cancer. She relied on her network of friends and extended family to help her as she underwent surgery at the Memorial Sloan Kettering Cancer Center. After the surgery was performed, she went for chemotherapy. Because DelFattore was unmarried, the first oncologist she consulted recommended a milder, rather than a more aggressive, course of treatment. The oncologist wanted to avoid serious side effects of the more aggressive treatment because he believed that single people have less effective social support than married people. DelFattore went to another oncology and was given the harsher, more effective chemotherapy by her new oncologist, who accepted DelFattore's insistence that she had the necessary support. The surgery and chemotherapy were successful. In September 2019, The New England Journal of Medicine published DelFattore's article Death by Stereotype? Cancer Treatment in Unmarried Patients. The article examines 84 medical articles that use a huge National Cancer Institute database to show that unmarried patients are significantly less likely to receive surgery or radiotherapy than patients who are married. DelFattore's article suggests that many physicians believe in cultural stereotypes that cause such physicians to make inappropriate recommendations for unmarried cancer patients.

In recent years, DelFattore has held an appointment as a scholar in residence at the New York Public Library. She is an active member of PEN America, the Cosmos Club, the Wilmington, Delaware Rotary Club of Rotary International, the International Women's Forum, the New York chapter of the Mystery Writers of America, and the Authors Guild,.

DelFattore gave a 2017 TEDx talk, Sick While Single? Don't Die of Discrimination and was interviewed on All Things Considered. Her articles about unmarried life and other topics have appeared in the Washington Post, the New York Herald Tribune, Psychology Today, Health Psychology, Psych Central, Quartz, and other popular news publications. She has appeared on many talk shows, including 20/20, The Diane Rehm Show, Radio Times with Marty Moss-Coane, Talk of the Nation, and Fresh Air. She lives in Newark, Delaware and frequently commutes to New York City.

== Selected publications ==
=== Articles ===
- Magill, Frank N., ed. (1981). "Chapter. Horror Short Fiction by Joan DelFattore". Critical Survey of Short Fiction, vol. 2. Englewood Cliffs, New Jersey: Salem Publishing. pp. 726–747.
- DelFattore, Joan (1989). "Religious Implications of Children's Literature as Viewed by Religious Fundamentalists: The Mozert Case". Children's Literature Association Quarterly. 14: 9–13. doi:10.1353/chq.0.0679.
- book chapters Eric Ambler (1909- ), pp. 13–24; Leslie Charteris (1907- ), pp. 58–67; Herman Cyril McNeile (Sapper) (1888-1937), pp. 221–226 by Joan DelFattore in Benstock, Bernard; Staley, Thomas F., eds. (1989). British mystery writers, 1920-1939. Gale Research Company. ISBN 978-0-8103-4555-3. (See Eric Ambler, Leslie Charteris, and H. C. McNeile.)
- book chapters Ian Fleming (1908-1964), pp. 85–112, and John le Carre (David John Moore Cornwell) (1931- ), pp. 240–255 by Joan DelFattore in Benstock, Bernard; Staley, Thomas, eds. (1989). British Mystery and Thriller Writers Since 1940. Dictionary of Literary Biography, vol. 87. Detroit: Gale Research. ISBN 978-0-7876-3072-0. (See Ian Fleming and John le Carre.)
- Karolides, Nicholas J.; Burress, Lee; Kean, John M., eds. (2001). "Fueling the Fire of Hell: A Reply to Censors of The Crucible by Joan DelFattore". Censored Books: Critical Viewpoints. Scarecrow Press. ISBN 978-0-8108-4038-6. (1st edition 1993)
- Green, Melanie C.; Strange, Jeffrey J.; Brock, Timothy C., eds. (30 January 2003). "Controversial narratives in the schools: Content, values, and conflicting viewpoints by Joan DelFattore". Narrative Impact: Social and Cognitive Foundations. Psychology Press. pp. 131–155. ISBN 978-1-135-67327-7.
- Justice, Ellen M.; Wolf, Diane G.; DelFattore, Joan; Wallace, Wendy; Holveck, Leanne (2017). "Healing Through Creativity: Library Staff Collaboration in Arts and Writing Programs". Journal of Hospital Librarianship. 17: 53–64. doi:10.1080/15323269.2017.1259446.
- DelFattore, Joan (September 5, 2019). "Death by Stereotype? Cancer Treatment in Unmarried Patients". New England Journal of Medicine. 381 (10): 982–985. doi:10.1056/NEJMms1902657. PMID 31483973.

=== Books ===
- DelFattore, Joan (January 1992). What Johnny Shouldn't Read: Textbook Censorship in America. Yale University Press. ISBN 0-300-06050-5. brief description, Yale University Press
- DelFattore, Joan (January 2004). The Fourth R: Conflicts over Religion in America's Public Schools. Yale University Press. ISBN 0-300-10217-8. LCCN 2003017364.
- DelFattore, Joan (26 October 2010). Knowledge in the Making: Academic Freedom and Free Speech in America's Schools and Universities. Yale University Press. ISBN 978-0-300-16851-8.
