= The Final Count =

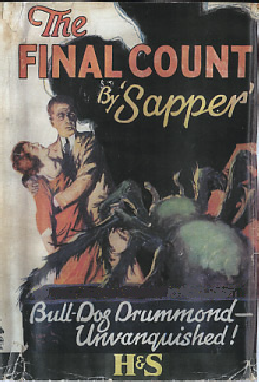
- First edition cover of The Final Count
- Author: H. C. McNeile (as Sapper)
- Language: English
- Series: Bulldog Drummond
- Genre: Crime fiction
- Publisher: Hodder & Stoughton
- Publication date: 1926
- Publication place: United Kingdom
- Media type: Print (Hardcover)
- Pages: 319pp
- OCLC: 774491286
- Preceded by: The Third Round
- Followed by: The Female of the Species

The Final Count was the fourth Bulldog Drummond novel. It was published in 1926 and written by H. C. McNeile under the pen name Sapper.

== Premise ==
Bulldog Drummond's old enemy Carl Peterson obtains the secret of brilliant scientist Robin Gaunt's newly developed chemical weapon and plots to use it to commit a series of spectacular crimes.

== Bibliography ==
- Treadwell, Lawrence P. (2001). The Bulldog Drummond Encyclopedia. Jefferson: McFarland & Company. ISBN 978-0-7864-0769-9.
