= Atholl Fleming =

British actor (1894–1972)

Atholl Fleming MBE
- Born: 6 December 1894; London, England
- Died: 6 May 1972 (aged 77); Sydney, Australia
- Occupation(s): Actor, radio personality

Atholl Fleming MBE (6 December 1894 – 6 May 1972) was a British actor and an Australian radio personality.

== Early life ==
He was the third of nine children of the Rev R. S. Fleming, a Scottish Baptist minister of Pitlochry and later Beckenham in Kent. After a fall as a child, he became deaf in his right ear. He was educated at the City of London School. He saw fighting in France during World War I with the Royal West Kent Regiment, notably the Battle of the Somme, and was wounded three times – a shrapnel wound to the head, a bayonet wound in the knee and gas injuries, which left him with a cough for the rest of his life. He was awarded the Freedom of the City of London.

== Career ==
After the War, he abandoned a career with the Bank of England for the stage, appearing in a number of Whitehall farces and dramas on BBC television at Alexandra Palace. He starred in People Like Us at The Strand in 1929. He toured Australia in 1932 with Dame Sybil Thorndike and Sir Lewis Casson, (playing Dunois in St Joan and Macduff in the Scottish play) and while in Sydney married fellow company member, Phyllis Best, daughter of Sir Robert Best, a former member of the Australian parliament from Hawthorn, Victoria. Their son Robert Atholl Fleming (later a British television director and producer and MD of Argo Productions,) was born in 1933. Fleming appeared in a number of British films throughout the 1930s most notably as Bulldog Drummond in the Jack Hulbert comedy thriller Bulldog Jack (1935).

Before the outbreak of the Second World War he volunteered for duty, but was rejected because of his age and WWI injuries. His Australian father-in-law persuaded him to take his family to Australia. He joined E. J. Tait's touring company, then the Australian Broadcasting Commission as actor and drama producer. He was active in the British Drama League and acted as adjudicator for its annual competitions. In 1946 he was a member of the "Radio Players", who performed Max Catto's They Walk Alone and Philip Johnson's Lover's Leap to outstanding reviews. For a time, he was co-producer (with Richard Parry) for Kathleen Robinson's "Whitehall Institute of Dramatic Art", a competitor of Doris Fitton's Independent Theatre. He notably appeared as Gloucester in John Alden's 1951 production of King Lear at St James' Hall in Phillip Street. He was called upon to adjudicate at major drama festivals.

As "Mac" he became the central figure in the Australian Broadcasting Commission's 'Children's Session' and, as "Jason", became the leader, to children all over Australia, of the hugely popular Argonauts Club for most of its 31-year run, from 7 January 1941 until 2 April 1972. With his wife Phyllis he visited countless schools and children's hospitals. He became a figure much loved by generations of Australian children.

== Honours ==
He was awarded an MBE on 14 June 1969 for his contribution to broadcasting and his work with children.

Fleming loved sport. He was a founder member of the Stage Golfing Society (handicap 7) and the Stage Cricket Club in England. He started the Stage and Radio Cricket Club in Sydney. He was a useful bat, a good slip field and a Machiavellian captain.

Atholl Fleming retired in 1969, shortly before the Children's Session and Argonauts Club were closed due to the rise of television. He was one of the best-loved and most respected figures in Australian broadcasting.

== Filmography ==
Year	Title	Role	Notes
1932	Men Like These		Film debut
1932	Tin Gods	Padre	
1933	Mixed Doubles	Ian MacConochie	
1934	Little Friend	Shepherd	
1935	Bulldog Jack	Bulldog Drummond	
1936	The Shadow of Mike Emerald	Clive Warner	
1937	O.H.M.S.	Military Instructor	Uncredited
1937	Non-Stop New York	Pilot	Final film, Uncredited
