= The Third Round (film) =

1925 film by Sidney Morgan

- Directed by: Sidney Morgan
- Written by: Sidney Morgan
- Based on: The Third Round; 1924 novel by H. C. McNeile
- Starring: Jack Buchanan; Betty Faire; Juliette Compton; Allan Jeayes
- Production company: Astra-National
- Distributed by: Charles Urban Trading Company
- Release date: November 1925
- Running time: 2,225.04 m
- Country: United Kingdom
- Language: None

The Third Round (1925) was the second silent film adaptation of the Bulldog Drummond character, starring Jack Buchanan and Betty Faire, adapted by Sidney Morgan from the novel of the same name by H. C. McNeile, and directed by Morgan.

== Cast ==
- Jack Buchanan as Captain Hugh Drummond
- Betty Faire as Phyllis Benton
- Juliette Compton as Irma Peterson
- Allan Jeayes as Carl Peterson
- Austin Leigh as Professor Goodman
- Frank Goldsmith as Sir Raymond Blayntree
- Edward Sorley as Julius Freyder
- Phil Scott as Sparring Partner
