= Knock-Out (novel) =

1933 novel by H. C. McNeile

- First edition cover of Knock-Out
- Author: H. C. McNeile (as Sapper)
- Language: English
- Series: Bulldog Drummond
- Genre: Crime fiction
- Publisher: Hodder & Stoughton
- Publication date: 1933
- Publication place: United Kingdom
- Media type: Print (Hardcover)
- Pages: 317pp
- OCLC: 54391529
- Preceded by: The Return of Bulldog Drummond
- Followed by: Bulldog Drummond at Bay

Knock-Out was the eighth Bulldog Drummond novel. It was published in 1932 and written by H. C. McNeile under the pen name Sapper. It was adapted into the film Bulldog Drummond Strikes Back.

== Bibliography ==
- Treadwell, Lawrence P. (2001). The Bulldog Drummond Encyclopedia. Jefferson: McFarland & Company. ISBN 978-0-7864-0769-9.
