= The Female of the Species (novel) =

1928 novel by H. C. McNeile

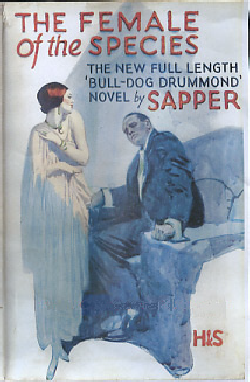
- First edition cover for The Female of the Species
- Author: H. C. McNeile (as Sapper)
- Language: English
- Series: Bulldog Drummond
- Genre: crime fiction
- Publisher: Hodder and Stoughton
- Publication date: 1928
- Publication place: United Kingdom
- Media type: Print (Hardcover)
- Pages: 312pp
- OCLC: 5877515
- Preceded by: The Final Count
- Followed by: Temple Tower

The Female of the Species was the fifth Bulldog Drummond novel. It was published in 1928 and written by H. C. McNeile under the pen name Sapper.

It was adapted into the 1937 American film Bulldog Drummond Comes Back directed by Louis King and starring John Barrymore and John Howard.

== Bibliography ==
- Treadwell, Lawrence P. (2001). The Bulldog Drummond Encyclopedia. Jefferson: McFarland & Company. ISBN 978-0-7864-0769-9.
