= Bulldog Drummond (radio program) =

Radio program

- Other names: The Adventures of Bulldog Drummond; The American Adventures of Bulldog Drummond
- Genre: Crime drama
- Running time: 30 minutes
- Country of origin: United States
- Language: English
- Syndicates: Mutual
- Starring: George Coulouris; Santos Ortega; Ned Wever; Cedric Hardwicke; Everett Sloane; Luis Van Rooten; Rod Hendrickson
- Announcer: Ted Brown; Henry Morgan
- Written by: Allan E. Sloane; Leonard Leslie; Edward J. Adamson; Jay Bennett
- Directed by: Himan Brown
- Produced by: Himan Brown
- Original release: April 13, 1941 – March 28, 1954

Bulldog Drummond is a radio crime drama in the United States. It was broadcast on Mutual April 13, 1941 – March 28, 1954. Garyn G. Roberts wrote in his book, Dick Tracy and American Culture: Morality and Mythology, Text and Context, "With its trademark foghorn, Bulldog Drummond was one of the premiere mystery programs of its time."

For a broader look at the character on which this program was based, see Bulldog Drummond.

== Format ==
Bulldog Drummond was "a British investigator called 'Bulldog' because he was relentless in the pursuit of criminals." The character was created by British author H. C. McNeile. In addition to McNeile's books, Drummond was featured in a series of films from Paramount Pictures in the 1930s. Drummond was described as "a polished man-about-town, whose hobby is crime detection and the apprehension of criminals."

Radio historian John Dunning commented, "With his sidekick Denny, Captain Hugh Drummond solved the usual run of murders, collected the usual run of bumps on the head, and ran afoul of underworld characters ranging from radium thieves to counterfeiters." In a 1948 column in the Oakland Tribune, media critic John Crosby called the program "the first of the more successful exemplars of radio espionage and intrigue."

One notable aspect of Bulldog Drummond was its opening (created by producer-director Himan Brown), which "evoked a London ambiance with footsteps, a foghorn, shots, and three blasts of a police whistle." Following the sound effects, an announcer introduced the program with the line, "Out of the fog ... out of the night ... and into his American adventures ... comes ... Bulldog Drummond."

The program was initially set in Great Britain, but after two months, the setting was moved to the United States, thus leading some sources to identify it as The American Adventures of Bulldog Drummond. In another change from the books, the radio program omitted Drummond's wife "and his gaggle of ex-army comrades." He did, however, keep his butler, Denny.

== Personnel ==
Drummond and Denny were the series' only regular characters. Over the years, Drummond was played by George Coulouris, Santos Ortega, Ned Wever, and Cedric Hardwicke. Actors portraying Denny were Everett Sloane, Luis van Rooten, and Rod Hendrickson. Others appearing frequently on the program were Agnes Moorehead, Paul Stewart, Ray Collins, and Mercedes McCambridge.

Announcers for Bulldog Drummond were Ted Brown, Henry Morgan, and Robert Shepard. The show's writers were Allan E. Sloane, Leonard Leslie, Edward J. Adamson, and Jay Bennett.

== Distribution ==
Bulldog Drummond was first broadcast on WOR in New York City. From there, it was distributed nationwide on the Mutual Broadcasting System. It was also carried in Canada.

In 1948, distribution shifted from Mutual's network to syndication via electrical transcription. The program continued to originate at WOR, with the Chartoc-Coleman company handling syndication. An advertisement in the trade publication Billboard touted: "Year after year, since 1941, 'Drummond' has rung up top ratings ... The name alone pulls listeners ... Want a low-priced show to do a top-price selling job? Don't pass up 'Bulldog Drummond.'"

A new version of Bulldog Drummond aired in 1953, once again on Mutual. Sir Cedric Hardwicke had the title role in what the network promoted as "a strengthened program structure" that also included Counterspy, and Starlight Theatre. The network also introduced "a new plan to pay stations in 'top-quality' programs instead of cash," with the revived Bulldog Drummond as one of "18 new 'star-name' shows." Those efforts were largely ineffective, however, as the final network version of Bulldog Drummond was broadcast only January 3, 1954 – March 28, 1954.
