= Bulldog Drummond (novel) =

1920 novel by H. C. McNeile

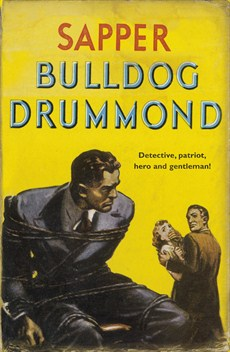
- First edition cover of Bulldog Drummond
- Author: H. C. McNeile (as Sapper)
- Language: English
- Series: Bulldog Drummond
- Genre: Crime fiction
- Publisher: Hodder & Stoughton
- Publication date: 1920
- Publication place: United Kingdom
- Media type: Print (Hardcover)
- Pages: 320pp
- OCLC: 30645323
- Followed by: The Black Gang
- Text: Bulldog Drummond at Wikisource

Bull-dog Drummond (later Bulldog Drummond) was the first Bulldog Drummond novel, written by H. C. McNeile under the pen name Sapper. Following serialisation in Hutchinson's Story Magazine from September 1919 to July 1920 under the title "Bull-Dog Drummond, D.S.O., M.C.", the book was published in 1920. The book included a Prologue that was absent from the serialisation. In 1921 it was adapted into a play of the same title starring Gerald du Maurier. In 1929, the book was adapted into a film of the same name starring Ronald Coleman.

== Plot ==
The novel begins with ex-British Army Captain Hugh "Bulldog" Drummond, DSO, MC, a wealthy former World War I officer of the Loamshire Regiment, dashing and strong, but not handsome, placing an advertisement in The Times stating his desire for an adventure. He receives a reply from a young woman, concerned about some business acquaintances of her father. It turns out that her father is being blackmailed by archvillain Carl Peterson who is attempting to organise a coup d'état to enable a pro-communist takeover of Britain. This is being done for financial gain as Peterson is being paid by wealthy foreigners who will profit from this.

Drummond is captured several times, and manages to escape several times, before eventually defeating Peterson and his henchmen, with the aid of ex-army friends.
