= Temple Tower (novel) =

1929 novel by H. C. McNeile

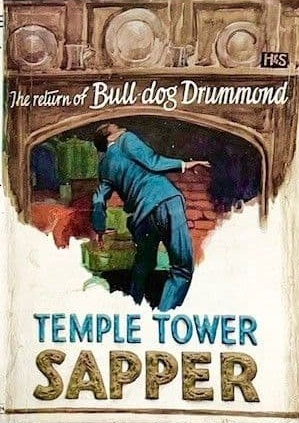
- First edition cover of Temple Tower
- Author: H. C. McNeile (as Sapper)
- Language: English
- Series: Bulldog Drummond
- Genre: crime fiction
- Publisher: Hodder and Stoughton
- Publication date: 1929
- Publication place: United Kingdom
- Media type: Print (Hardcover)
- Pages: 320pp
- OCLC: 504761284
- Preceded by: The Female of the Species
- Followed by: The Return of Bulldog Drummond

Temple Tower was the sixth Bulldog Drummond novel. It was published in 1929 and written by H. C. McNeile under the pen name Sapper. It was adapted into the 1930 film Temple Tower.

== Bibliography ==
- Treadwell, Lawrence P. (2001). The Bulldog Drummond Encyclopedia. Jefferson: McFarland & Company. ISBN 978-0-7864-0769-9.
