= Loamshire Regiment =

Fictional entity used for training purposes by the British Army

Loamshire Regiment is a placeholder name used by the British Army to provide examples for its procedures. For example, the Loamshire Regiment is provided by the British Forces Post Office to show how to write a British Army address, and is used to set out specimen charges for violations of military law. It is used in Hesketh Hesketh-Prichard's Sniping in France, a World War One manual for training British Army sharpshooters.

BFPO Specimen Address

12345678 LCPL B Jones
B Company
1 Loamshire Regt
BFPO 61

Specimen Charge

Using violence towards his superior officer contrary to section 33(1)(a) of the Army Act 1955 in that he at — on — [struck] [punched] [kicked] No 12345678 Sergeant J Brown, The Loamshire Regiment.

The Loamshire Regiment can be taken to be the county regiment of the fictional county of Loamshire. The regiment itself has been featured in several works of fiction. Bulldog Drummond, the hero of the stories by "Sapper", was an officer in the Loamshire Regiment (in this case the 'Royal Loamshires') during the First World War, as was one of the characters in The Life and Death of Colonel Blimp. The regiment is also mentioned by Evelyn Waugh in Men at Arms, part of the Sword of Honour trilogy, and Put Out More Flags. Loamshire is the setting for one of George Eliot's novels, Felix Holt, the Radical. Peter Fleming, brother of Ian Fleming, refers to the regiment and the Loamshire Argos newspaper in his essay The Last Day in Camp.

== See also ==
- Tommy Atkins
