= Bulldog Jack =

1935 British film by Walter Forde

- UK film poster
- Directed by: Walter Forde
- Written by: Gerard Fairlie; Sidney Gilliat; Jack Hulbert; J. O. C. Orton; H. C. McNeile (novel)
- Produced by: Michael Balcon
- Starring: Jack Hulbert; Fay Wray; Ralph Richardson
- Cinematography: Mutz Greenbaum
- Edited by: Otto Ludwig
- Music by: Hubert Bath; Bretton Byrd; Louis Levy
- Distributed by: Gaumont-British Picture Corp. of America
- Release date: 15 July 1935 (UK)
- Running time: 72 minutes
- Country: United Kingdom
- Language: English

Bulldog Jack (released as Alias Bulldog Drummond in the USA) is a 1935 British comedy film produced by Gaumont British, directed by Walter Forde, and starring Jack Hulbert, Fay Wray, Ralph Richardson and Atholl Fleming.

The film was followed by many others involving the story of Captain Hugh 'Bulldog' Drummond; however, because of the various production companies involved, the actor playing Bulldog was frequently changed.

It premiered at the Tivoli Theatre in London on 15 July 1935 and reached the US in September the same year, renamed Alias Bulldog Drummond.

Bulldog Jack includes action set in a fictional London Underground station of Bloomsbury.

== Plot ==
Bulldog Drummond is injured when his sabotaged car is involved in a crash. When Jack Pennington agrees to masquerade as the sleuth, he is enlisted to help Ann Manders find her jeweller grandfather who has been kidnapped by a gang of crooks who want him to copy a valuable necklace they want to steal. Their plan backfires in the British Museum and the film climaxes in a chase on a runaway train in the London Underground.

== Production ==
The movie was mostly filmed on a stage sets, however they used real driver views of the Underground tunnels.

A fictional closed Tube station (Bloomsbury) is featured as an important part of the staging of the film, being part of an intricate hideaway for the bad guys. The Underground becomes a key element in the film when the trail "Bulldog" and his assistant are on leads them to the boarded-up street entrance of a closed "Bloomsbury" station; the dapper detectives in tophats and tails ride the Tube circuit back around to the nearest station to the closed one, and then sneak onto the tracks headed to the closed platform. Part way there, a train appears down the tunnels and the men hastily climb onto the tube walls and lay flat, only to see the train disappear one car after another, switching to another Tube line.

In a short but memorable scene, "Bulldog" turns a table upside-down and rides the long spiral staircase all the way to the bottom, passing two crooks on the way, and sliding across the platform and tumbling onto the tracks. The film's smashing climax is on a runaway train in the Tube, and throughout the scene the point of view is from the front of the train.

Bulldog Jack shows the basic appearance of the Underground in the 1930s and WWII, including the seemingly endless spiral staircases and other features that most Londoners would have been familiar with.

== Cast ==
- Jack Hulbert as Jack Pennington
- Fay Wray as Ann Manders
- Ralph Richardson as Morelle
- Claude Hulbert as Algy Longworth
- Gibb McLaughlin as Denny
- Atholl Fleming as Bulldog Drummond
- Paul Graetz as Salvini
- Cyril Smith as Duke (uncredited)

== Reception ==
The reviewer for The Times wrote: "The progress of this picture is like many a left-hander's innings – slow and quite unconvincing at the start, but providing some highly entertaining fireworks before the finish."

== See also ==
- Bulldog Drummond
- Fictional underground stations
