= Challenge (novel) =

1937 novel by H. C. McNeile

- UK cover for Challenge
- Author: H. C. McNeile (as Sapper)
- Language: English
- Series: Bulldog Drummond
- Genre: crime fiction
- Publisher: Hodder & Stoughton
- Publication date: 1937
- Publication place: United Kingdom
- Media type: Print (Hardcover)
- Pages: 311pp
- OCLC: 2476396
- Preceded by: Bulldog Drummond at Bay

Challenge was the tenth and final Bulldog Drummond novel written by H. C. McNeile. It was published in 1935 under McNeile's pen name Sapper.

== Bibliography ==
- Treadwell, Lawrence P. (2001). The Bulldog Drummond Encyclopedia. Jefferson: McFarland & Company. ISBN 978-0-7864-0769-9.
