= The Black Gang (novel) =

1922 novel by H. C. McNeile

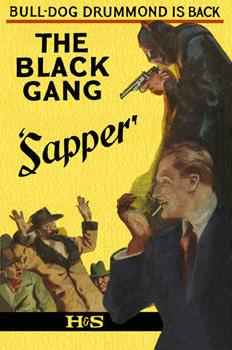
- First edition cover of The Black Gang
- Author: H. C. McNeile (as Sapper)
- Language: English
- Series: Bulldog Drummond
- Genre: crime fiction
- Publisher: Hodder & Stoughton
- Publication date: 1922
- Publication place: United Kingdom
- Media type: Print (Hardcover)
- Pages: 318pp
- OCLC: 5877465
- Preceded by: Bulldog Drummond
- Followed by: The Third Round

The Black Gang was the second Bulldog Drummond novel. It was published in 1922 and written by H. C. McNeile under the pen name Sapper.

== Premise ==
Following his experiences in Bulldog Drummond, Bulldog Drummond forms an organisation (the titular Black Gang) to operate, using brutal and illegal means, against left-wing movements in England. Alarmed by setbacks caused by the gang's activities, Carl Peterson, who is secretly the mastermind behind the left-wing movements, comes to England in disguise, accompanied by the femme fatale Irma, to stamp out the gang and gain revenge on Drummond for the events of the first novel.

== Bibliography ==
- Treadwell, Lawrence P. (2001). The Bulldog Drummond Encyclopedia. Jefferson: McFarland & Company. ISBN 978-0-7864-0769-9.
