= Bulldog Drummond at Bay (novel) =

1935 novel by H. C. McNeile

- First edition cover of Bulldog Drummond at Bay
- Author: H. C. McNeile (as Sapper)
- Language: English
- Series: Bulldog Drummond
- Genre: Crime fiction
- Publisher: Hodder & Stoughton
- Publication date: 1935
- Publication place: United Kingdom
- Media type: Print (Hardcover)
- Pages: 310pp
- OCLC: 504760947
- Preceded by: Knock-Out
- Followed by: Challenge

Bulldog Drummond at Bay was the ninth Bulldog Drummond novel. It was published in 1935, and written by H. C. McNeile under the pen name Sapper. It was filmed in 1937 and in 1947.

== Bibliography ==
- Treadwell, Lawrence P. (2001). The Bulldog Drummond Encyclopedia. Jefferson: McFarland & Company. ISBN 978-0-7864-0769-9.
