= Bulldog Drummond (1929 film) =

1929 film

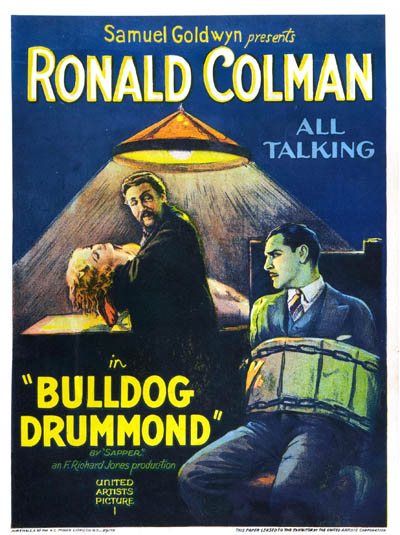
- Theatrical release poster
- Directed by: F. Richard Jones
- Written by: Sidney Howard (adaptation); Wallace Smith
- Based on: Bulldog Drummond by Herman C. McNeile
- Produced by: Samuel Goldwyn
- Starring: Ronald Colman; Claud Allister; Lawrence Grant; Montagu Love; Joan Bennett; Lilyan Tashman; Wilson Benge
- Cinematography: George S. Barnes; Gregg Toland
- Edited by: Frank Lawrence; Viola Lawrence
- Music by: Hugo Riesenfeld
- Production company: Samuel Goldwyn Productions
- Distributed by: United Artists
- Release date: May 2, 1929 (U.S.)
- Running time: 90 minutes
- Country: United States
- Language: English

Bulldog Drummond is a 1929 American pre-Code crime film in which Hugh "Bulldog" Drummond helps a young woman in distress. The film stars Ronald Colman as the title character, Claud Allister, Lawrence Grant, Montagu Love, Wilson Benge, Joan Bennett, and Lilyan Tashman. Produced by Samuel Goldwyn and directed by F. Richard Jones, the film was adapted by Sidney Howard from the 1921 play by H. C. McNeile (credited onscreen as "Sapper").

Colman was nominated for the Academy Award for Best Actor in a Leading Role, and William Cameron Menzies for Best Art Direction.

Two previous Bulldog Drummond films had been produced: Bulldog Drummond (1923) and Bulldog Drummond's Third Round (1925). The 1929 film was the first Bulldog Drummond movie with sound, and was also Ronald Colman's first talkie. A series of Drummond movies followed, beginning with Temple Tower made in the UK in 1930; see the main article on Bulldog Drummond for a complete list.

== Plot ==
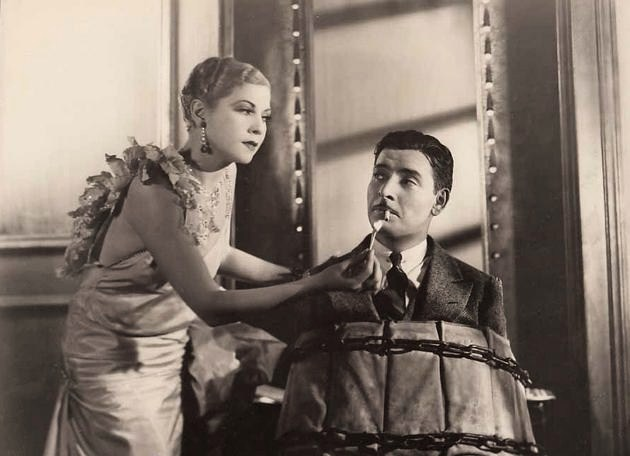
Still with Lilyan Tashman and Ronald Colman

Bulldog Drummond (1929)

Hugh "Bulldog" Drummond, a demobilised British captain bored with civilian life, places a personal advertisement in The Times offering his services for "any excitement". One of the many replies intrigues him: Phyllis Benton claims she is in great danger. He immediately sets out for the Green Bay Inn, where she has reserved some rooms for him. Unable to persuade him to give up this mad adventure, his friend Algy Longworth follows after, dragging Drummond's valet, Danny, along.

Phyllis turns out to be all Drummond had hoped for: beautiful and desperately in need of help. Her wealthy uncle, John Travers, is being treated in a hospital by a Dr. Lakington for a nervous breakdown, but she is sure there is something wrong about the hospital and Dr. Lakington, and that she is being watched constantly. She runs away when she spots the outline of two eavesdropping men (Algy and Danny), much to Drummond's annoyance. She is caught and taken to Dr. Lakington's Nursing Home by Carl Peterson, Irma and the doctor.

When Drummond follows, he witnesses Travers' unsuccessful attempt to escape. Drummond drives away, but returns stealthily and rescues Phyllis. Sending her off with Algy and Danny, he sneaks back once more and overhears Irma convince the others to stay and try to get Travers' signature on a document transferring securities and jewels to them. Drummond manages to save Travers.

However, he makes a serious error when he takes Travers back to the inn. The villains soon arrive there. Drummond manages to disguise himself as Travers; the crooks take him back, along with Phyllis. When they realise they have the wrong man they threaten to torture Phyllis. Drummond tells them Travers is hidden at the inn (whereas he is really being driven to London). While Peterson and Irma go to check, Drummond is freed by Phyllis before Lakington can kill him. He strangles the doctor. Drummond disarms Peterson when he returns, but his gang pose as policemen and take him away. Phyllis persuades Drummond to let them go, telling him she loves him.

== Cast ==
- Ronald Colman as Hugh Drummond
- Claud Allister as Algy Longworth
- Lawrence Grant as Dr. Lakington
- Montagu Love as Carl Peterson
- Wilson Benge as Danny, Drummond's valet
- Joan Bennett as Phyllis Benton
- Lilyan Tashman as Irma
- Charles Sellon as John Travers
- Adolph Milar as Marcovitch
- Tetsu Komai as Chong
- Gertrude Short as Barmaid
- Donald Novis as Country Boy
- Tom Ricketts as Colonel in club (uncredited)

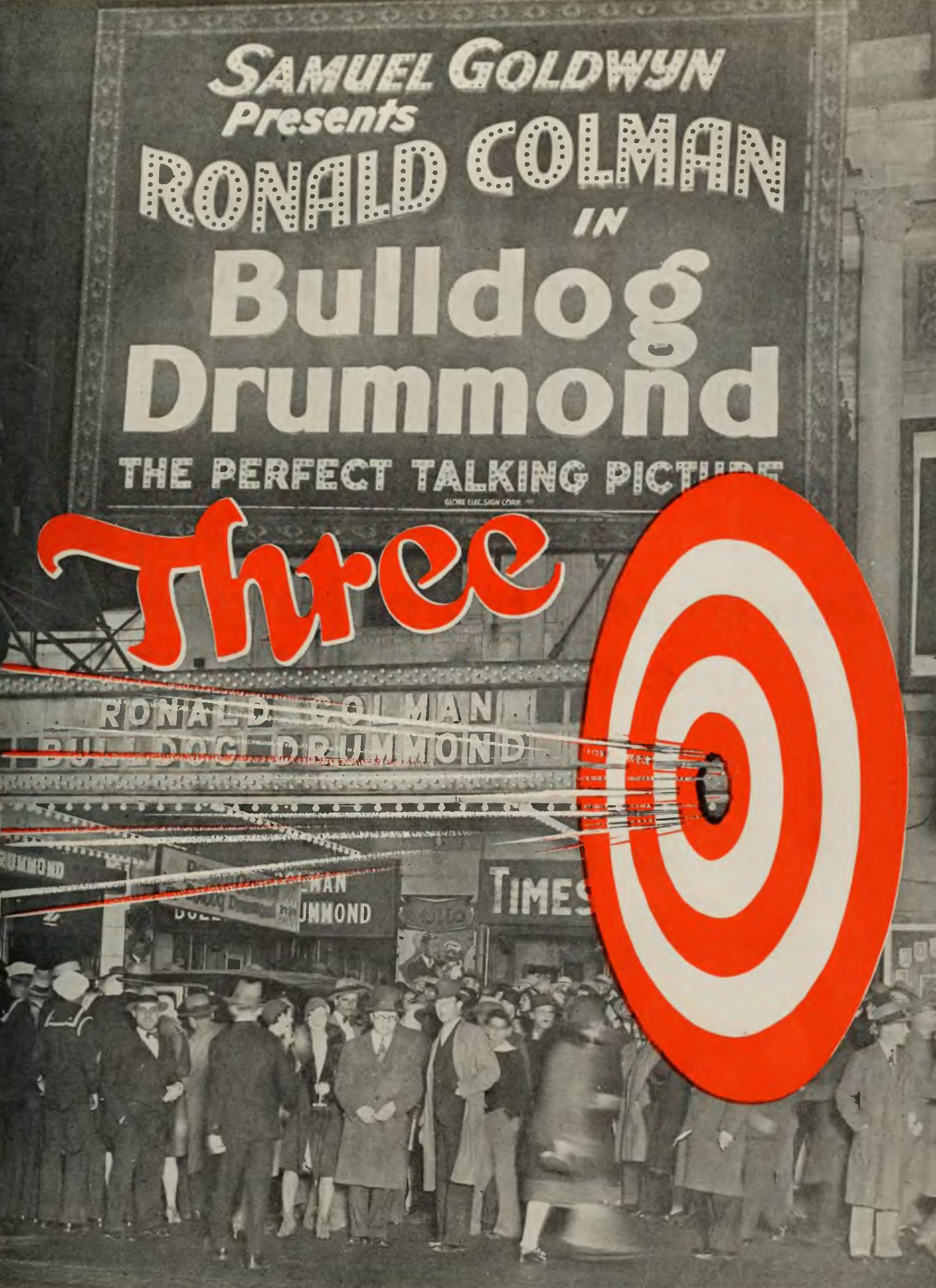
Bulldog Drummond ad in The Film Daily, 1929

== Critical reaction ==
Mordaunt Hall of The New York Times called the film "the happiest and most enjoyable entertainment of its kind that has so far reached the screen", and recommended it to those who had harsh words for the burgeoning phenomenon of motion pictures with sound. Hall lauded the film for going beyond a mere filmed version of the stage show, and the "artistry" with which director F. Richard Jones fashioned his scenes with an eye toward humor and thrills. Hall also praised the technical achievement of the sound quality, and the performances of Ronald Colman, Montagu Love, and Lilyan Tashman.

== See also ==
- List of early sound feature films (1926–1929)
- List of films in the public domain in the United States
