= Michael Denning =

American historian (born 1954)

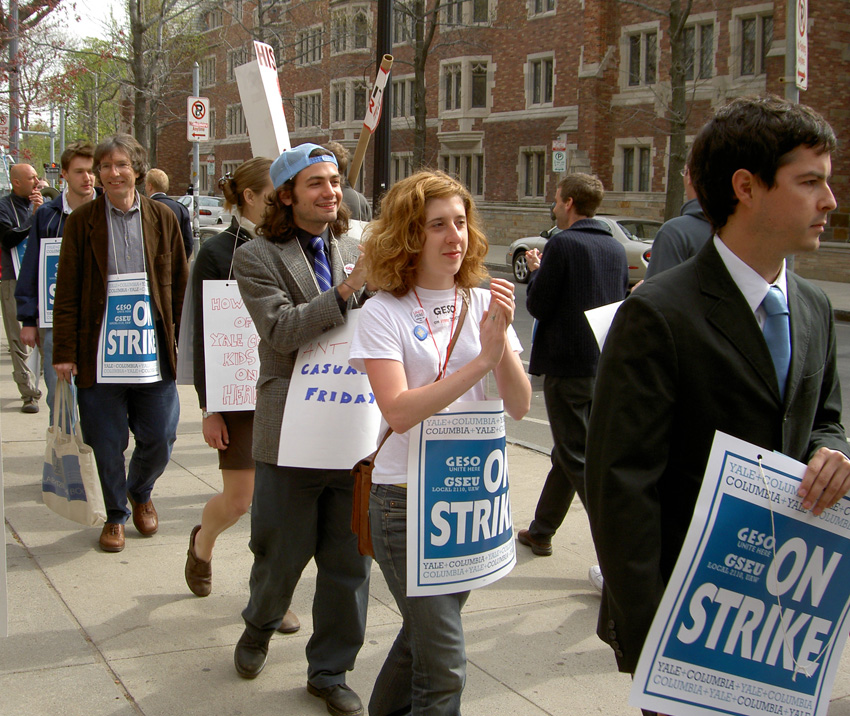
- Denning, on left in a brown jacket, in 2005
- Born: 1954 (age 71–72)
- Education: Yale University (PhD)
- Occupation: Cultural historian
- Spouse: Hazel Carby

Michael Denning (born 1954) is an American cultural historian and William R. Kenan, Jr. Professor of American Studies at Yale University. His work has been influential in shaping the field of American Studies by importing and interpreting the work of British Cultural Studies theorists. Although he received his Ph.D. from Yale University and studied with Fredric Jameson, perhaps the greatest influence on his work is the time he spent at the Centre for Contemporary Cultural Studies working with Stuart Hall.

He is married to literary scholar Hazel Carby.
