= Bulldog Drummond (1922 film) =

1922 British film by Oscar Apfel

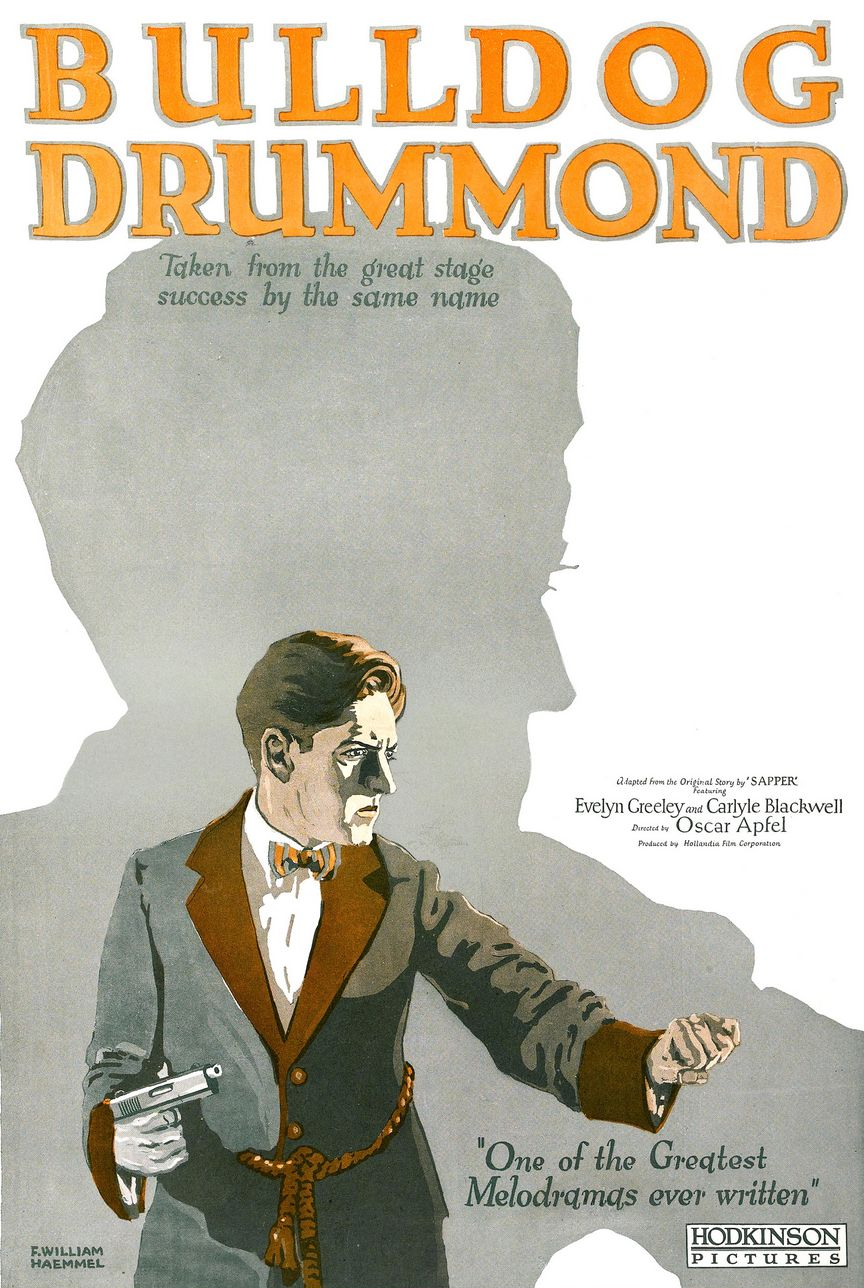
- Film poster
- Directed by: Oscar Apfel
- Written by: B. E. Doxat-Pratt; Wallace Smirh; Sidney Howard
- Based on: Bulldog Drummond; 1921 play by Herman C. McNeile
- Produced by: Maurits Binger
- Starring: Carlyle Blackwell; Evelyn Greeley; Dorothy Fane; Warwick Ward
- Cinematography: George Barnes; Gregg Toland
- Edited by: Frank Lawrence; Viola Lawrence
- Production company: Hollandia Film Corporation
- Distributed by: Astra-National; United Artists Corp.
- Release date: 21 October 1922
- Running time: 6 reels
- Country: United Kingdom
- Budget: £5,000

Bulldog Drummond is a 1922 British silent mystery film directed by Oscar Apfel and starring Carlyle Blackwell Sr. and Evelyn Greeley. The story was adapted by B. E. Doxat-Pratt and produced by Maurits Binger.

It is the first film adaptation of the Bulldog Drummond fictional character.

== Cast ==
- Carlyle Blackwell as Hugh Drummond
- Evelyn Greeley as Phyllis Benton
- Dorothy Fane as Irma Peterson
- Warwick Ward as Dr. Lakington
- Willem van der Veer as Carl Peterson (as Horace de Vere)
- Gerald Dean as Algy Longworth
- Harry Bogarth as Sparring Partner
- William Browning as James Handley

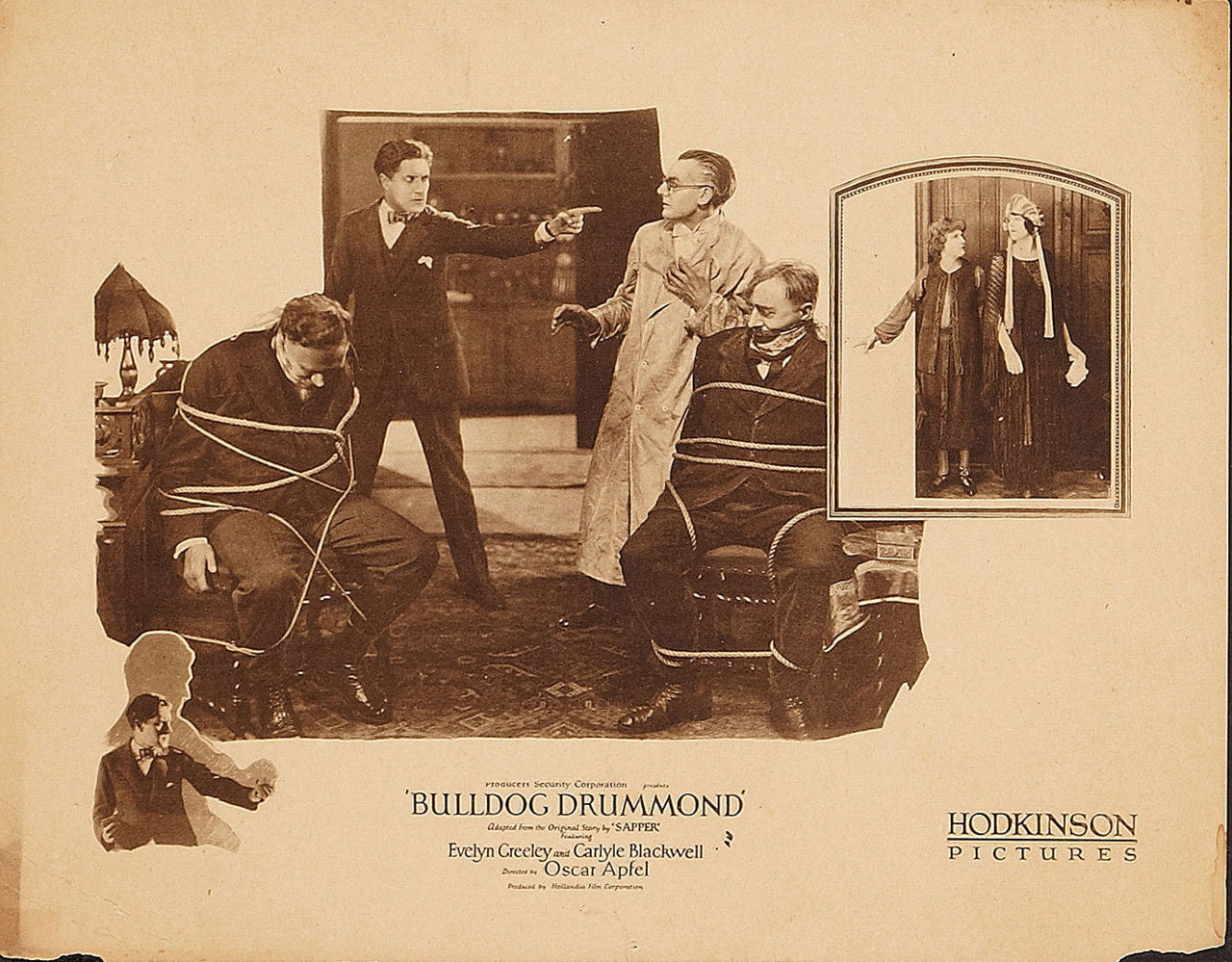
Lobby card for Bulldog Drummond

== Production ==
Bulldog Drummond was filmed in the Netherlands.

== Survival status ==
It is unknown whether any recording of the film survives, so it may be a lost film.
