= The Third Round (novel) =

1924 novel by H. C. McNeile

- Title page for The Third Round (1949 edition)
- Author: H. C. McNeile (as Sapper)
- Language: English
- Series: Bulldog Drummond
- Genre: crime fiction
- Publisher: Hodder and Stoughton
- Publication date: 1924
- Publication place: United Kingdom
- Media type: Print (Hardcover)
- Pages: 320pp
- OCLC: 5166846
- Preceded by: The Black Gang
- Followed by: The Final Count

The Third Round is the third Bulldog Drummond novel. It was published in 1924 and written by H. C. McNeile under the pen name Sapper.

== Premise ==
Bulldog Drummond's old enemy Carl Peterson is hired by a diamond syndicate to suppress, by any means necessary, the eccentric Professor Goodman's newly discovered method for producing artificial diamonds. While accepting the syndicate's money, Peterson secretly plans to obtain the method for his own use. Drummond is drawn into the matter because his friend Algy Longworth happens to be engaged to the professor's daughter.

== Bibliography ==
- Treadwell, Lawrence P. (2001). The Bulldog Drummond Encyclopedia. Jefferson: McFarland & Company. ISBN 978-0-7864-0769-9.
