= Bernard Benstock =

American literary critic and English professor

- Born: 1930
- Died: July 14, 1994 (aged 63–64); Egremont, Massachusetts, U.S.
- Occupations: University of Miami English professor and literary critic
- Writing career
- Movements: Irish literature, Modernism

Bernard Benstock (1930 – July 14, 1994) was a literary critic and professor of English at the University of Miami and an authority on British mystery writers and Irish writers Seán O'Casey and James Joyce.

Benstock was editor of the James Joyce Literary Supplement and a co-founder of the International James Joyce Foundation, where he served as president for eight years. He died on July 14, 1994, at the age of 64, in South Egremont, Massachusetts.

His wife, Shari Benstock, donated about 1,500 documents of his to the Roberto Ruffilli Library in Forli, Italy.

== Selected works ==
- Benstock, Bernard (1965). Joyce-Again's Wake: An Analysis of Finnegans Wake. University of Washington Press.
- Benstock, Bernard (1971). Sean O'Casey. Irish writers. Vol. 4. Bucknell University Press. ISBN 0838777481.
- Benstock, Bernard (1976). Paycocks and Others: Sean O'Casey's World. Barnes & Noble Books. ISBN 0-06-490363-X.
- Benstock, Bernard; Staley, Thomas F., eds. (1976). Approaches to Joyce's Portrait: Ten Essays. University of Pittsburgh Press. ISBN 0822933314.
- Benstock, Bernard (1977). James Joyce: The Undiscover'd Country. Barnes & Noble Books. ISBN 0-06-493278-8.
- Benstock, Bernard; Benstock, Shari (1980). Who's He When He's At Home: A James Joyce Directory. University of Illinois Press. ISBN 0252007565.
- Benstock, Bernard (1985). Art in Crime Writing: Essays on Detective Fiction. St. Martin's Press. ISBN 0-312-05397-5.
- Benstock, Bernard (1989). British Mystery and Thriller Writers Since 1940: First Series (Dictionary of Literary Biography). Gale Cengage. ISBN 0-8103-4565-X.
- Benstock, Bernard (1993). Narrative Con/Texts in Dubliners. University of Illinois Press. ISBN 0-252-02058-8.
