= H. C. McNeile =

British soldier and author (1888–1937)

McNeile, 1930s Portrait by Howard Coster

Herman Cyril McNeile, MC (28 September 1888 – 14 August 1937), commonly known as Cyril McNeile and publishing under the name H. C. McNeile or the pseudonym Sapper, was a British soldier and author. Drawing on his experiences in the trenches during the First World War, he started writing short stories and getting them published in the Daily Mail. As serving officers in the British Army were not permitted to publish under their own names, he was given the pen name "Sapper" by Lord Northcliffe, the owner of the Daily Mail; the nickname was based on that of his corps, the Royal Engineers.

After the war McNeile left the army and continued writing, although he changed from war stories to thrillers. In 1920 he published Bulldog Drummond, whose eponymous hero became his best-known creation. The character was based on McNeile himself, on his friend Gerard Fairlie and on English gentlemen generally. McNeile wrote ten Bulldog Drummond novels, as well as three plays and a screenplay.

McNeile interspersed his Drummond work with other novels and story collections that included two characters who appeared as protagonists in their own works, Jim Maitland and Ronald Standish. He was one of the most successful British popular authors of the inter-war period before his death in 1937 from throat cancer, which has been attributed to damage sustained from a gas attack in the war.

McNeile's stories are either directly about the war, or contain people whose lives have been shaped by it. His thrillers are a continuation of his war stories, with upper class Englishmen defending England from foreigners plotting against it. Although he was seen at the time as "simply an upstanding Tory who spoke for many of his countrymen", after the Second World War his work was criticised as having fascist overtones, while also displaying the xenophobia and anti-semitism apparent in some other writers of the period.

== Biography ==
=== Early life ===
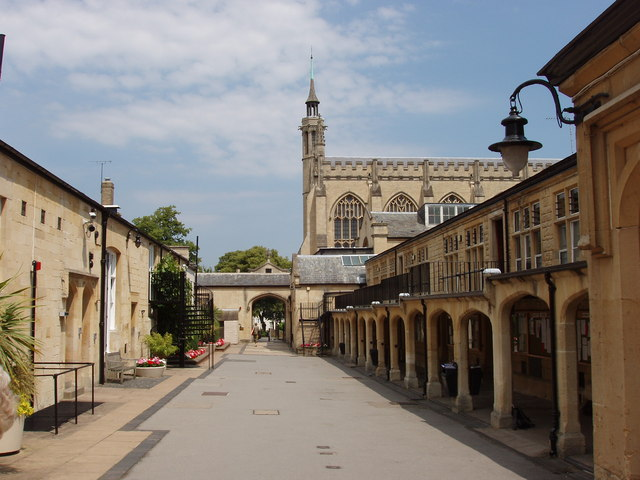
Cheltenham College, where McNeile enjoyed playing sports, but did not excel at them

McNeile was born in Bodmin, Cornwall. He was the son of Malcolm McNeile, a captain in the Royal Navy who at the time was governor of the naval prison at Bodmin, (Note: Malcolm McNeile was also later the governor of Lewes Naval Prison.) and Christiana Mary (née Sloggett). The McNeile family had ancestral roots from both Belfast and Scotland, and counted a general in the British Indian Army among their members.

McNeile did not like either of his given names but preferred to be called Cyril, although he was always known by his friends as Mac. After attending a prep school in Eastbourne, he was further educated at Cheltenham College. On leaving the college, he joined the Royal Military Academy, Woolwich, from which he was commissioned into the Royal Engineers as a second lieutenant in July 1907. He underwent further training at the Royal School of Military Engineering before a short posting to Aldershot Garrison. He received promotion to lieutenant in June 1910 and was posted to Canterbury, serving three years with the 3rd Field Troop, until January 1914, when he was posted to Malta.

In 1914 McNeile was promoted to the rank of captain. He was still in Malta when the war broke out and was ordered to France in October 1914; he travelled via England and married Violet Evelyn Baird on 31 October 1914. She was the daughter of Lieutenant-Colonel Arthur Baird Douglas of the Cameron Highlanders. (Note: He is also named as Arthur Sholto Douglas in some sources.)

=== First World War service ===
On 2 November 1914 McNeile travelled to France as part of the British Expeditionary Force. Few details are known about McNeile's wartime service, as his records were destroyed by incendiary bombs during the Second World War. He spent time with a number of Royal Engineer units on the Western Front, including 1st Field Squadron RE, 15th Field Company RE and RE elements of the 33rd Division.

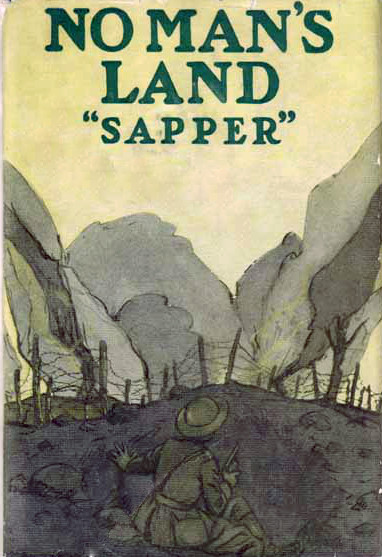
US cover of No Man's Land, published in 1917

McNeile's first known published story, Reminiscences of Sergeant Michael Cassidy, was serialised on page four of the Daily Mail from 13 January 1915. (Note: Although there are claims that suggest Sapper's first stories were published in Blackwood's Magazine, none of these appear in the 1914–1918 issues under the name McNeile or Sapper. His obituary in The Sunday Times states that he had written "practically nothing" prior to the war.) As serving officers in the British Army were not permitted to publish under their own names except during their half-pay sabbaticals, many would write under a pseudonym; Lord Northcliffe, the owner of the Daily Mail, gave McNeile the pen name "Sapper", as the Royal Engineers were commonly known as the Sappers. McNeile later confided that he had started writing through "sheer boredom". Some of his stories appeared on page four of the Daily Mail over the following months. Northcliffe was impressed by his writing and attempted, but failed, to have him released from the army to work as a war correspondent. By the end of 1915, he had written two collections of short stories, The Lieutenant and Others and Sergeant Michael Cassidy, R.E., both of which were published by Hodder & Stoughton. Although many of the stories had already appeared in the Daily Mail, between 1916 and 1918 Sergeant Michael Cassidy, R.E. sold 135,000 copies and The Lieutenant and Others published in 1915 sold 139,000 copies. By the end of the war he had published three more collections, Men, Women, and Guns (1916), No Man's Land (1917) and The Human Touch (1918). In 1916 he wrote a series of articles titled The Making of an Officer, which appeared under the initials C. N., in five issues of The Times between 8 and 14 June 1916. The articles were aimed at young and new officers to explain their duties to them; these were collected together and published by Hodder & Stoughton later in 1916.

During his time with the Royal Engineers, McNeile saw action at the First and Second Battles of Ypres—he was gassed at the second battle—and the Battle of the Somme. In 1916 he was awarded the Military Cross and was mentioned in dispatches; in November that year he was gazetted to acting major. From 1 April to 5 October 1918, he commanded a battalion of the Middlesex Regiment and was promoted to acting lieutenant-colonel; the scholar Lawrence Treadwell observes that "for an engineer to command an infantry regiment was ... a rarity". 18th Battalion, Middlesex Regiment under McNeile saw action for the remainder of his command, and were involved in fighting during the Hundred Days Offensive in the St. Quentin-Cambrai sector in September 1918; during the year, he was again mentioned in dispatches. On 2 October 1918 he broke his ankle and was briefly hospitalised, which forced him to relinquish his command of the battalion on 4 October. He was on convalescent leave when the war ended in November 1918. During the course of the war, he had spent a total of 32 months in France, and had probably been gassed more than once. His literary output from 1915 to 1918 accounted for more than 80 collected and uncollected stories. His brother—also in the Royal Engineers—had been killed earlier in the war.

=== Post-war years ===
McNeile had a quiet life after the war; his biographer Jonathon Green notes that "as in the novels of fellow best-selling writers such as P. G. Wodehouse or Agatha Christie, it is the hero who lives the exciting life". Although he was an "unremittingly hearty man", he suffered from delicate health following the war. He had a loud voice and a louder laugh, and "liked to enliven clubs and restaurants with the sight and sound of military good fellowship"; his friend and collaborator Gerard Fairlie described him as "not everybody's cup of tea", and commented that "he was loud in every possible way—in his voice, in his laugh, in his clothes, in the unconscious swagger with which he always motivated himself, in his whole approach to life". McNeile and his wife had two sons.

On 13 June 1919 McNeile retired onto the reserve officer list and was confirmed in the rank of major. The same year he also published a novel, Mufti, in which he introduced a type of character as "the Breed", a class of Englishman who was patriotic, loyal and "physically and morally intrepid". Although well received by the critics, the book failed commercially and, by the end of 1922, had only sold 16,700 copies from its first print run of 20,000; the unsold copies were pulped and the novel went out of print later that year.

"Demobilised officer, ... finding peace incredibly tedious, would welcome diversion. Legitimate, if possible; but crime, if of a comparatively humorous description, no objection. Excitement essential."

— Advertisement placed in The Times by Drummond in Bulldog Drummond

In 1920 McNeile published Bull-Dog Drummond, whose eponymous hero—a member of "the Breed"—became his most famous creation. He had first written Drummond as a detective for a short story in The Strand Magazine, but the character was not successful and was changed for the novel, which was a thriller. Captain Hugh "Bulldog" Drummond DSO, MC was described in the novel's sub-title as "a demobilised officer who found peace dull" after service during the First World War with the fictional Loamshire Regiment. Drummond went on to appear in ten full-length novels by McNeile (Note: The ten Drummond novels are: Bull-Dog Drummond (1920), The Black Gang (1922), The Third Round (1924), The Final Count (1926), The Female of the Species (1928), Temple Tower (1929), The Return of Bull-Dog Drummond (1932), Knock-Out (1933), Bull-Dog Drummond at Bay (1935) and Challenge (1937).) and a further seven by his friend Gerard Fairlie. The character was an amalgam of Fairlie, himself, and his idea of an English gentleman. (Note: Bourn disputes the Fairlie background to the character, noting that it was Fairlie who made the claim, although "he was still at school when Sapper created his ... hero".) Drummond also had roots in the literary characters Sherlock Holmes, Sexton Blake, Richard Hannay and The Scarlet Pimpernel. Drummond was characterised as large, very strong, physically unattractive and an "apparently brainless hunk of a man", who was also a gentleman with a private income; he could also be construed as "a brutalized ex-officer whose thirst for excitement is also an attempt to reenact [sic] the war". The character was later described by Cecil Day-Lewis, author of rival gentleman detective Nigel Strangeways, as an "unspeakable public school bully". Drummond's main adversary across four novels is Carl Peterson, (Note: The four Drummond novels with Carl Peterson are: Bull-Dog Drummond (1920), The Black Gang (1922), The Third Round (1924) and The Final Count (1926).) a master criminal with no national allegiance, who is often accompanied by his wife, Irma. Irma is described by Jonathon Green as "the slinky epitome of a twenties 'vamp'", and by Lawrence Treadwell as dark, sexy and from an oriental background, "a true femme fatale". After Carl Peterson's death in The Final Count, Irma swears revenge on Drummond and kidnaps his wife—whom he had met in Bull-Dog Drummond—with the intent of killing him in the ensuing chase. Irma Peterson appears in six of McNeile's books, and in a further five by Fairlie. (Note: The six Drummond novels with Irma Peterson are: Bull-Dog Drummond (1920), The Black Gang (1922), The Third Round (1924), The Final Count (1926), The Female of the Species (1928) and The Return of Bulldog Drummond (1932).)

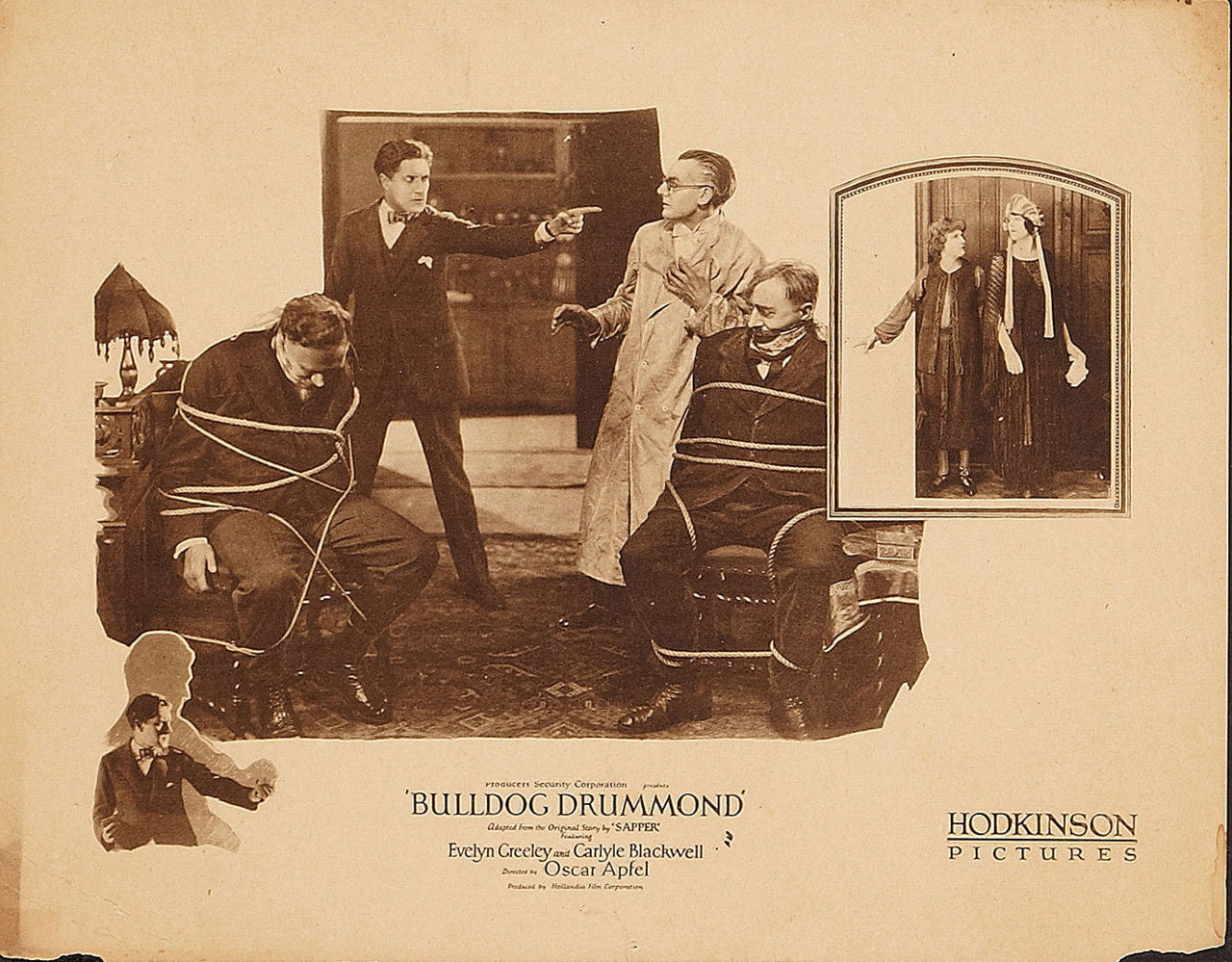
Lobby card for US screenings of the 1922 film, Bulldog Drummond

McNeile adapted Bulldog Drummond for the stage. It was produced at Wyndham's Theatre during the 1921–22 season, with Gerald du Maurier playing the title role; it ran for 428 performances. (Note: Du Maurier again played the role on 8 November 1932 in a special charity performance at the Royal Adelphi Theatre attended by King George VI.) The play also ran in New York during the same season, with A. E. Matthews as Drummond. (Note: The play was later adapted for the screen and became the silent 1922 film Bulldog Drummond, with Carlyle Blackwell as the lead.) Later in 1922 McNeile resigned his reserve commission with the rank of lieutenant-colonel, and moved as a tax exile to Territet, Montreux, Switzerland, with his wife; the Swiss countryside was later described in a number of his stories.

The following year McNeile introduced the character of Jim Maitland, a "footloose sahib of the period". (Note: Although published in the 1920s and 30s, the Maitland stories were set in 1912–13.) Maitland was the protagonist of the 1923 novel Jim Maitland; he later appeared in a second novel in 1931, The Island of Terror. Around the time McNeile killed off the Carl Peterson character in The Final Count (1926), he also introduced the character Ronald Standish, who first appeared in The Saving Clause (1927) and Tiny Carteret (1930) before becoming the protagonist in two collections of short stories, Ronald Standish (1933) and Ask for Ronald Standish (1936). The character also appeared in the final three Drummond novels, Knock-Out (1933), Bull-Dog Drummond at Bay (1935) and Challenge (1937). Standish was a sportsman who played cricket for England and was a part-time consultant with the War Office.

In 1929 McNeile edited a volume of short stories from O. Henry, The Best of O. Henry; the stories had served as models for him when he had started as a writer. The same year, the film Bulldog Drummond was released, starring Ronald Colman in the title role. Colman was nominated for an Academy Award for Best Actor at the 3rd Academy Awards ceremony. The film earned $750,000 at the box office, and McNeile received an estimated £5,000 for the rights to his novel. The same year he wrote his second play—The Way Out—which was staged at the Comedy Theatre in January 1930. (Note: The cast for The Way Out included Ian Hunter and Beatrix Thomson.) About a year later he and his wife returned to England, and settled near Pulborough, West Sussex.

In 1935 McNeile, Fairlie, Sidney Gilliat and J.O.C. Orton collaborated on the screenplay Bulldog Jack, a "comedy thriller" with Jack Hulbert and Fay Wray, which was produced by Gaumont British.

=== Death and legacy ===
In 1937 McNeile was working with Fairlie on the play Bulldog Drummond Hits Out (Note: Jonathon Green names the play as Bulldog Drummond Again, although this is not supported by any other sources.) when he was diagnosed with terminal throat cancer. He came to an agreement with Fairlie for the play to continue after his death and for Fairlie to continue writing the Drummond stories. McNeile died on 14 August 1937 at his home in West Chiltington, West Sussex. Although most sources identify throat cancer as the cause of death, Treadwell also suggests that it may have been lung cancer. It was "traceable to his war service", and attributed to a gas attack. His funeral, with full military honours, was conducted at Woking crematorium. At his death his estate was valued at over £26,000.

Bulldog Drummond Hits Out was finished by Fairlie and had a short tour of Brighton, Birmingham, Manchester and Edinburgh, before opening in London at the Savoy Theatre on 21 December 1937. The story was later turned into a novel by Fairlie, with the title Bulldog Drummond on Dartmoor. Fairlie continued to write Drummond novels, seven in total. When the Second World War broke out, Fairlie put Bulldog Drummond firmly in the anti-fascist camp, fighting for Britain. (Note: The seven Bulldog Drummond novels written by Fairlie are: Bulldog Drummond on Dartmoor (1938), Bulldog Drummond Attacks (1939), Captain Bulldog Drummond (1945), Bulldog Drummond Stands Fast (1947), Hands Off Bulldog Drummond (1949), Calling Bulldog Drummond (1951) and The Return of the Black Gang (1954).)

Drummond, McNeile's chief literary legacy, became a model for other literary heroes created in the 1940s and '50s. W. E. Johns used McNeile's work as a model for his character Biggles, while Ian Fleming admitted that James Bond was "Sapper from the waist up and Mickey Spillane below". Sydney Horler's popular character "Tiger" Standish was also modelled on Drummond.

== Writing ==
McNeile's works fall into two distinct phases. Those works published between 1915 and 1918 are his war stories, and relate directly to his experiences during the First World War, while the later works are largely thrillers. His war stories were marketed by the Daily Mail and Hodder & Stoughton as a soldier's eyewitness accounts. When he started writing thrillers, Hodder & Stoughton advertised McNeile as a "light and entertaining" writer, and began publishing his works in the "Yellow Jacket" series.

=== Style and technique ===
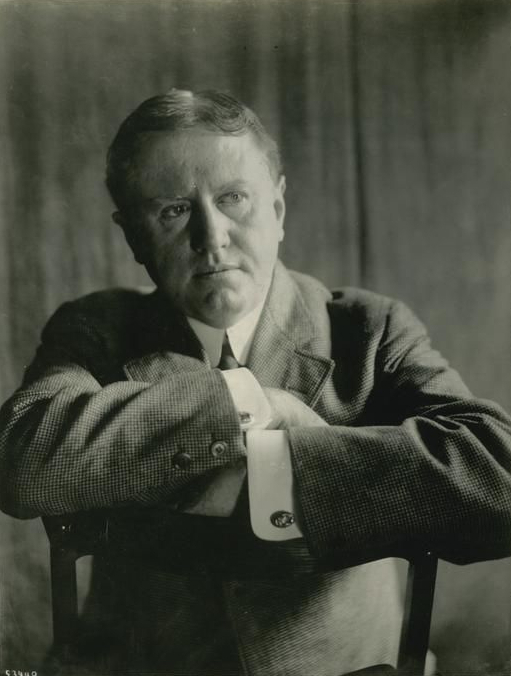
O. Henry was a literary model for McNeile

McNeile's early works, the war stories published before 1919, are either "plot-driven adventure narrative[s]", such as the short stories "The Song of the Bayonet" and "Private Meyrick, Company Idiot", or "atmospheric vignette[s]", such as "The Land of Topsy Turvy" and "The Human Touch". McNeile would write about 1,000 words every morning in a routine that was rarely disturbed; he took no breaks while writing and would do no re-writes until he completed his work. The academic Jessica Meyer has criticised his style as having "little aesthetic merit, being stylised, clichéd and often repetitive"; Richard Usborne agreed, adding that the female characters were "cardboard" and that McNeile was "wonderfully forgetful" about characters dead in one book and alive in the next. In the Bulldog Drummond stories, Watson identifies the central character as "a melodramatic creation, workable only within a setting of melodrama". The academic Joan DelFattore points out that while the characters and plots cannot be considered to be unique, credible or well-rounded, his books "make no claim to literary excellence", and are instead, "good, solid thrillers". Usborne agrees, and believes that McNeile wrote good stories that were flawed but well told. Meyer classifies the non-war stories as middlebrow, with "sentimental plotlines and presenting a social message about the condition of England". His early novels, particularly Bull-Dog Drummond and The Black Gang, were structured loosely and in some ways as short stories. The academic Hans Bertens blamed this on McNeile's lack of experience and self-confidence, noting that in his later novels, McNeile "mastered the tricks of his trade".

DelFattore outlines the use of double adjectives to reinforce feelings towards enemies in both his war stories and thrillers, such as "filthy, murdering Boche", and "stinking, cowardly Bolshevik". She and the scholar Lise Jaillant also comment on the dehumanisation of the enemy, comparing them to animals and vermin. Watson noted the frequency of the use of the word "devil"—and variations—when discussing antagonists.

=== Major themes ===
==== First World War ====
The major theme running throughout McNeile's works is the First World War. Between 1915 and 1918 he had five collections of short stories published about the war, while his post-war fiction can be seen as an extension of those stories, as "both treat the war as a trial with manhood at stake". His war stories were considered by contemporary audiences as anti-sentimental, realistic depictions of the trenches, and as a "celebration of the qualities of the Old Contemptibles". McNeile's view, as expressed through his writing, was that war was a purposeful activity for the nation and for individuals, even if that purpose was later wasted: a "valuable chance at national renewal that had been squandered". The positive effects of war on the individual were outlined by McNeile in The Making of an Officer, his series of articles in The Times, in which he wrote about "the qualities of leadership and selflessness essential to 'inspire' subalterns", a theme he returned to in his war stories—particularly The Lieutenant and Others and Sergeant Michael Cassidy, R.E—and then afterwards in his fictional stories, notably the Bulldog Drummond works.

McNeile's fictional work—particularly his Drummond series of books—shows characters who have served in the war and have been affected by it; Jaillant comments that Drummond's war-time experience "has shaped his social identity, his skills, and even his physical appearance". The Drummond character has been "brutalized by war", which accounts for his physical approach when dealing with Peterson and others.

==== England ====
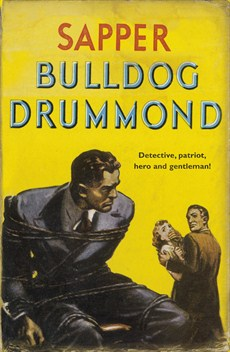
First edition cover of Bulldog Drummond

McNeile provided Drummond with a "flamboyantly aggressive patriotism" towards England, which Drummond defends physically against those who challenge its stability or morality. Bertens tried to argue that the patriotism demonstrated by Drummond was closer to nationalistic pride and a paranoia about threats directed at the upper middle classes, of which Drummond was a member. Drummond's nickname—Bulldog—is symbolic of England, and he and his English gentlemen friends—"the Breed"—fight the conspiracy of foreigners threatening England's stability. McNeile's thriller stories do not often pit Englishman against Englishman as the main characters; most of the foreigners in his books are the villains.

==== Sport ====
Running throughout McNeile's books is the metaphor of warfare as sport. His war stories include descriptions of fights between individuals that carry a sporting motif: in Sergeant Michael Cassidy, R.E., he writes, "To bag a man with a gun is one thing; there is sport—there is an element of one against one, like when the quality goes big game shooting. But to bag twenty men by a mine has not the same feeling at all, even if they are Germans". The motif was continued into the Drummond novels. McNeile reinforces this theme through his use of the language of public school sports, or of boxing, poker or hunting. The titles of his books also use sporting imagery: The Third Round, The Final Count, Knock-Out and Challenge.

=== Reception ===
McNeile's war story collections sold well; nearly 50,000 copies of his first book, Sergeant Michael Cassidy, R.E., were purchased in its first year, and nearly 58,000 copies the following year. His thrillers were also popular, with Bulldog Drummond selling 396,302 copies between 1920 and 1939, exceeding the 100,000-copies benchmark for "best-sellers". At his peak in the 1920s, he was the highest paid short story writer in the world, and it was estimated that in the last five years of his life he was earning around £10,000 a year; the Daily Mirror estimated that during his writing career he had earned £85,000.

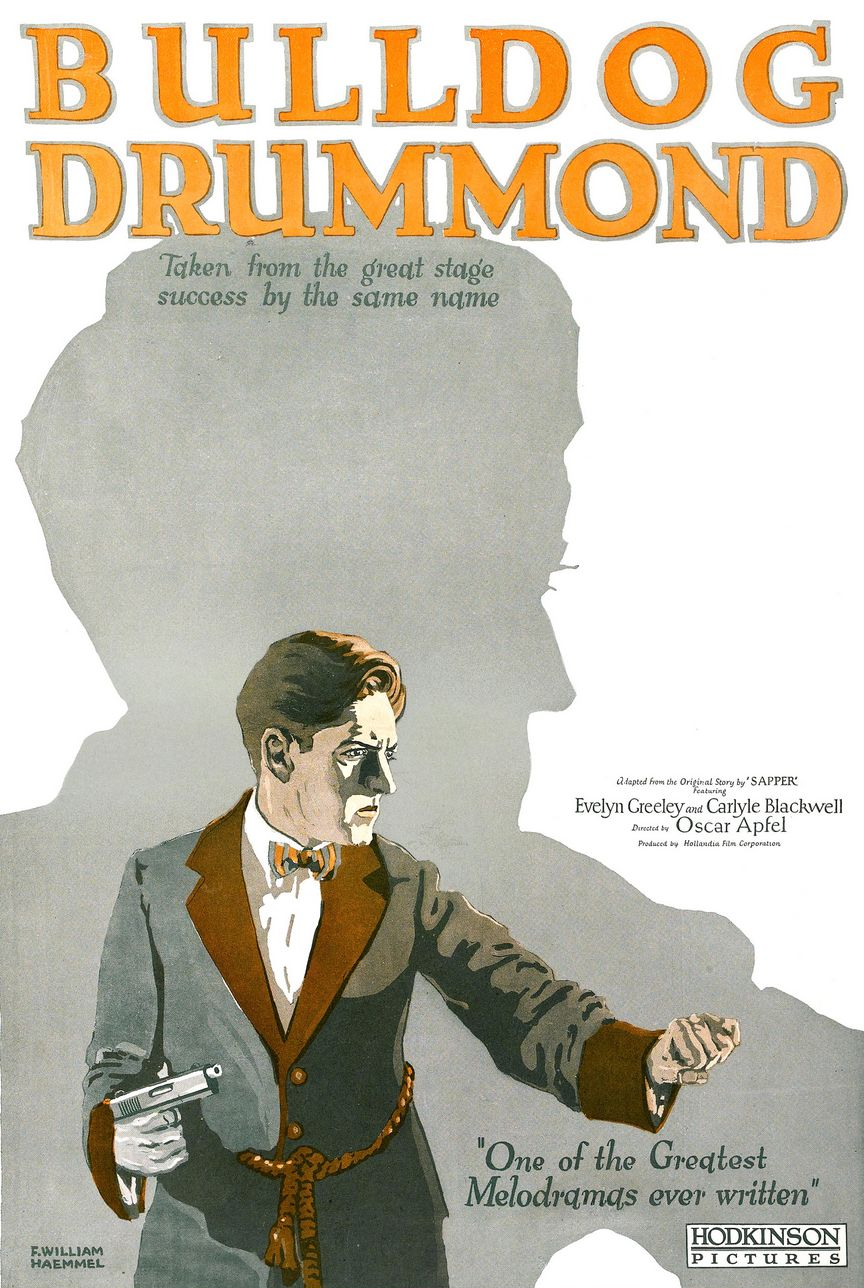
Poster for the 1922 film Bulldog Drummond, based on McNeile's play of the same name

McNeile's war stories were seen by reviewers as honest portrayals of the war, with British and American reviewers in the mainstream press praising his realism and avoidance of sentimentality in dealing with his subject matter. Reviewing Men, Women, and Guns for The Times Literary Supplement, Francis Henry Gribble wrote that "Sapper has been successful in previous volumes of war stories ... When the time comes for picking out the writers whose war fiction has permanent value, his claim to be included in the list will call for serious examination." The reviewer of Sergeant Michael Cassidy, R.E. for The Atlanta Constitution reminded its readers that McNeile "has been called the foremost literary genius of the British army." Jaillant observes that once McNeile moved from war stories to thrillers, with the concurrent re-positioning of advertising and marketing by Hodder & Stoughton, the reviewers also treated him differently, and presented him as "a writer of thrillers, without any pretension to literary seriousness". When reviewing Bulldog Drummond Strikes Back (Note: The novel was first published in the UK under the title Knock-Out and was renamed Bulldog Drummond Strikes Back for the US market.) for The New York Times, the critic observed that "if you like a good knock-down-and-drag-out yarn with excitement and violence on nearly every page, you can't go wrong on Bulldog Drummond"; for the novel Bulldog Drummond at Bay, the reviewer considered that "as a piece of fictional melodrama, the book is first rate". In the British market, The Times Literary Supplement also characterised him as a mass-market thriller writer, which contrasted with its consideration of his earlier works.

==== Controversy ====
From the 1950s on, McNeile's work came to be viewed in the light of events of the Second World War, and journalists such as Richard Usborne highlighted aspects of the stories which he considered were "carrying the Führer-principle". DelFattore agrees, and considers that the second Bulldog Drummond novel—The Black Gang (1922)—is when the fascist element was introduced. Jaillant notes that the accusations of fascism only came about after the Second World War, while the academic Ion Trewin considers that through the Drummond stories, McNeile was seen at the time as "simply an upstanding Tory who spoke for many of his countrymen".

Throughout the Drummond stories, much of the language used by McNeile relating to ethnic minorities or Jews is considered by DelFattore to be "intensely conservative by modern standards"; Green observes that while the characters of other contemporary writers, such as Agatha Christie, "exhibit the inevitable xenophobia and anti-Semitism of the period, McNeile's go far beyond the 'polite' norms". J. D. Bourn considers his language to be "rather distasteful", while the academic Michael Denning observed that "Drummond is a bundle of chauvinisms, hating Jews, Germans, and most other foreigners".

== Notes and references ==
Notes

== Bibliography ==
- Adrian, Jack; Symons, Julian (1992). Strange tales from the Strand. Oxford: Oxford University Press. ISBN 978-0-19-282997-9.
- Bertens, Hans (1990). "A Society of Murderers Run on Sound Conservative Lines: The Life and Times of Sapper's Bulldog Drummond". In Bloom, Clive (ed.). Twentieth-Century Suspense: The Thriller Comes of Age. Basingstoke: The Macmillan Press. ISBN 978-0-333-47592-8.
- Bourn, J. D. (October 1990). "Sapper: Creator of Bull-Dog Drummond". The Book and Magazine Collector (79). Diamond Publishing Group.
- DelFattore, Joan (1988). "Herman Cyril McNeile (Sapper)". In Benstock, Bernard; Staley, Thomas (eds.). British Mystery Writers, 1920–1939. Detroit: Gale Research. ISBN 978-0-7876-3072-0.
- Denning, Michael (1987). Cover Stories: Narrative and Ideology in the British Spy Thriller. London: Routledge & K. Paul. ISBN 978-0-7100-9642-5.
- Frank, Sam (1997). Ronald Colman: A Bio-bibliography. Westport, CT: Greenwood Publishing Group. ISBN 978-0-313-26433-7.
- Fairlie, Gerard (1952). With Prejudice: Almost an Autobiography. London: Hodder & Stoughton. OCLC 2195522.
- Green, Jonathon (2004). "McNeile, (Herman) Cyril [pseud. Sapper]". Oxford Dictionary of National Biography (online ed.). Oxford University Press. doi:10.1093/ref:odnb/34810. (Subscription, Wikipedia Library access or UK public library membership required.)
- Haycraft, Howard (2005). The Boy's Second Book of Great Detective Stories. Whitefish, MT: Kessinger Publishing. ISBN 978-1-4191-2277-4.
- Hynes, Samuel (1990). A War Imagined: The First World War and Modern Memory. London: The Bodley Head. ISBN 978-0-370-30451-9.
- Jaillant, Lise (2011). "Sapper, Hodder & Stoughton, and the Popular Literature of the Great War". Book History. 14. Johns Hopkins University Press. ISSN 1098-7371.
- McNeile, H. C. (1920). Bull-Dog Drummond: The Adventures of a Demobilised Officer Who Found Peace Dull. London: Hodder & Stoughton. OCLC 562338129.
- McNeile, H.C.; Trewin, Ion (1983). The Black Gang. London: Dent. ISBN 978-0-460-02245-3.
- Meyer, Jessica (2007). "The Tuition of Manhood: Sapper's War Stories and the Literature of the War". In Hammond, Mary; Towheed, Shafquat (eds.). Publishing in the First World War: Essays in Book History. Basingstoke: Palgrave Macmillan. ISBN 978-0-230-50076-1.
- Neuburg, Victor E. (1983). The Popular Press Companion to Popular Literature. Bowling Green: Bowling Green State University Popular Press. ISBN 978-0-87972-233-3.
- Panek, LeRoy (1981). The Special Branch: The British Spy Novel, 1890–1980. Popular Press. ISBN 978-0-87972-178-7.
- Sutherland, John (2012). Lives of the Novelists. New Haven: Yale University Press. ISBN 978-0-300-18243-9.
- Treadwell, Lawrence P. (2001). The Bulldog Drummond Encyclopedia. Jefferson, NC: McFarland & Company. ISBN 978-0-7864-0769-9.
- Usborne, Richard (1983). Clubland Heroes: A Nostalgic Study of the Recurrent Characters in the Romantic Fiction of Dornford Yates, John Buchan and "Sapper". London: Hutchinson. ISBN 978-0-09-152821-8.
- Watson, Colin (1971). Snobbery With Violence: English Crime Stories and their Audience. London: Eyre Methuen. ISBN 0-413-46570-5.
- Who Was Who, Volume 3 (1929–1940). London: A & C Black. 1967. ISBN 978-0-7136-0170-1. (subscription required)
