= William Flannery =

American art director

- Born: November 17, 1898; Ohio
- Died: January 25, 1959 (aged 60); Los Angeles, California
- Occupation: Art director
- Years active: 1937-1959

William Edward Flannery (November 17, 1898 – January 25, 1959) was an American art director and architect for William Randolph Hearst. He won an Academy Award in the category Best Art Direction for the film Picnic.

As an architect, his projects included a beachside mansion for Hearst's girlfriend Marion Davies. The main mansion was demolished, but part of the property survives as the Annenberg Community Beach House.

Flannery married silent film actress Mary Mercedes Campbell and they had a son Patrick John, born in 1927. During the Great Depression he became an art director.

== Select art direction ==
Film

- Forlorn River (1937)
- Sons of the Legion (1938)
- Campus Confessions (1938)
- Disbarred (1939)
- Ambush (1939)
- Persons in Hiding (1939)
- Undercover Doctor (1939)
- Million Dollar Legs (1939)
- $1000 a Touchdown (1939)
- All Women Have Secrets (1939)
- Women Without Names (1940)
- Untamed (1940)
- Golden Gloves (1940)
- North West Mounted Police (1940)
- World Premiere (1941)
- True to the Army (1942)
- Mrs. Wiggs of the Cabbage Patch (1942)
- Night Plane from Chungking (1943)
- Dixie (film) (1943)
- Going My Way (1944)
- Murder, He Says (1945)
- Incendiary Blonde (1945)
- Duffy's Tavern (1945)
- The Bells of St. Mary's (1945)
- Sister Kenny (1946)
- Abie's Irish Rose (1946)
- Arch of Triumph (1948)
- The Sun Sets at Dawn (1950)
- Valentino (1951)
- My Son John (1952)
- The Savage (1952
- Never Wave at a WAC (1953)
- Captain Scarface (1953
- The Shanghai Story (1954)
- Phffft (1954)
- Tarzan's Hidden Jungle (1955)
- Picnic (1955)
- The Harder They Fall (1956)
- Full of Life (1956)
- Space Ship Sappy (1957)
- The 30 Foot Bride of Candy Rock (1959)
- The Crimson Kimono (1959)
- Going My Way (1944)

Television

- Damon Runyon Theater (2 episodes, 1955))
- Playhouse 90 (1 episode, 1957)
- The Ford Television Theatre (15 episodes, 1956-1957)
- Father Knows Best (5 episodes, 1956)
- Shirley Temple's Storybook (4 episodes, 1958))
- The Donna Reed Show (1 episode, 1959)
