= Saigon (1948 film) =

1948 film by Leslie Fenton

- Theatrical release poster
- Directed by: Leslie Fenton
- Screenplay by: P.J. Wolfson; Arthur Sheekman
- Based on: Julian Zimet
- Produced by: P.J. Wolfson
- Starring: Alan Ladd; Veronica Lake; Douglas Dick
- Cinematography: John F. Seitz
- Edited by: William Shea
- Music by: Robert Emmett Dolan
- Production company: Paramount Pictures
- Distributed by: Paramount Pictures
- Release date: March 31, 1948 (U.S.)
- Running time: 93 minutes
- Country: United States
- Language: English
- Box office: $2,250,000 (US rentals); 1,365,485 admissions (France)

Saigon is a 1948 American crime film directed by Leslie Fenton, starring Alan Ladd and Veronica Lake in their fourth and final film together. It was distributed by Paramount Pictures and was one of the last films Veronica Lake made under her contract with the studio. Ladd and Lake had made This Gun for Hire and The Glass Key, both in 1942, and The Blue Dahlia in 1946 for Paramount. While the earlier films all proved to be big box office successes, Saigon did not do as well financially. Ladd continued to be one of Paramount's top male stars, while Lake's career was in decline. By the end of 1948 her contract with Paramount had expired and the studio chose not to renew it.

For Ladd, Saigon was one of a series of adventure films set in foreign locales, starting with Two Years Before the Mast (1946) and Calcutta (1947).

== Plot ==
World War II has ended and Major Larry Briggs finds out that his friend Captain Mike Perry has only two months to live due to a head injury. Larry and Sergeant Pete Rocco are determined to show Mike a good time before he dies. For a $10,000 fee, Larry takes a flying job working for Alex Maris, a profiteer. Everything is set until Maris' secretary, Susan Cleaver, shows up to board the aircraft. Mike falls for Susan and Larry convinces her to play along but she has fallen in love with Larry.

The first flight is disrupted by Maris arriving a half-hour late with the police right behind. Larry takes off but is forced to make an emergency landing after both engines fail. After checking into a small hotel, the Americans find Police Lieutenant Keon, who is shadowing them, believing that they are smugglers.

When Larry sees Mike falling for Susan, he wants the romance to end and despite her carrying $500,000 for Maris, Larry tells her to leave immediately. When Mike longs for Susan, Larry relents and blackmails her into seeing him or he will turn her into Keon. Sailing to Saigon on a boat, Larry tricks Keon by stowing the money away into an envelope he mails to himself, and throws all suspicion off Susan.

On reaching Saigon, Larry knows he has fallen in love with Susan even though Mike has proposed to her. At Susan's hotel, an enraged Maris and his valet Simon hold Larry hostage, demanding the money that has been posted. Bursting in, Pete realizes what is happening, and fights with Simon, but both men fall off a balcony to their deaths. Susan has secretly arranged to retrieve the money from the post office, returning it to Maris. Mike and Larry confront him but in an exchange of gunfire, Mike and Maris are killed. After Mike's funeral, Larry and Susan start a new life together.

== Cast ==
- Alan Ladd as Major Larry Briggs
- Veronica Lake as Susan Cleaver
- Douglas Dick as Captain Mike Perry
- Wally Cassell as Sergeant Pete Rocco
- Luther Adler as Lieutenant Keon
- Morris Carnovsky as Alex Maris
- Luis Van Rooten as Simon
- Mikhail Rasumny as Hotel clerk
- Eugene Borden as Boat captain
- Griff Barnett as Surgeon

== Production ==
In May 1943, Harry Hervey sold an original story to MGM about the Japanese invasion of French Indochina called Saigon. This film was never made. In October 1945 it was announced that Paramount would make a film called Saigon about the relationship between a British officer and an American woman during the Japanese occupation of Indochina. Wells Root was to write and produce. Eventually the studio abandoned this project, in early 1946.

Later, the studio decided to use the title for a new story, set in post-World War II Indochina and starring Alan Ladd, who had previously appeared in exotic adventure tales such as China and (the then still unreleased) Calcutta. In September 1946 it was announced Ladd would star, PJ Wolfson would produce and James Henagan and John Leman were writing the script. Leslie Fenton was assigned to direct in October. It was meant to start that month but shooting was pushed back when Wild Harvest (1947), starring Ladd, took an extra 10 days to film. This meant that Fenton was replaced as director on The Big Clock by John Farrow.

Douglas Dick was cast in November. Luther Adler joined the same month.

Filming took place in late 1946 and early 1947. For the movie, Veronica Lake reverted to her famous "peek-a-boo bob" hairstyle, which she had abandoned during the war at the request of the government because female factory workers kept getting their hair caught in machinery while imitating it.

== Reception ==
=== Critical ===
Film critic Philip K. Scheuer in his review of Saigon for the Los Angeles Times, called the film "long on atmosphere and short on logic." In a similar vein, Bosley Crowther simply dismissed the film as "sorry" and "a fine lot of super-silly moonshine, more to be laughed at than esteemed."

Diabolique magazine says "it's the least effective" of the Lake-Ladd teamings, arguing "It starts off excellently but tails away in its second half. The storyline feels cobbled together from elements of previous Paramount hits, particularly ones starring Ladd."

=== Box office ===
Although commonly regarded in retrospect as a flop, due to comparison with Ladd's more successful motion pictures, the film was reasonably popular. Variety listed Saigon as the fourth most popular film at the box office in March 1948 and the 7th most popular film in April.

The film was also popular at the British box office.

== See also ==
- Mess jacket (civil)
