= Joyce Mathews =

American actress (1919–1999)

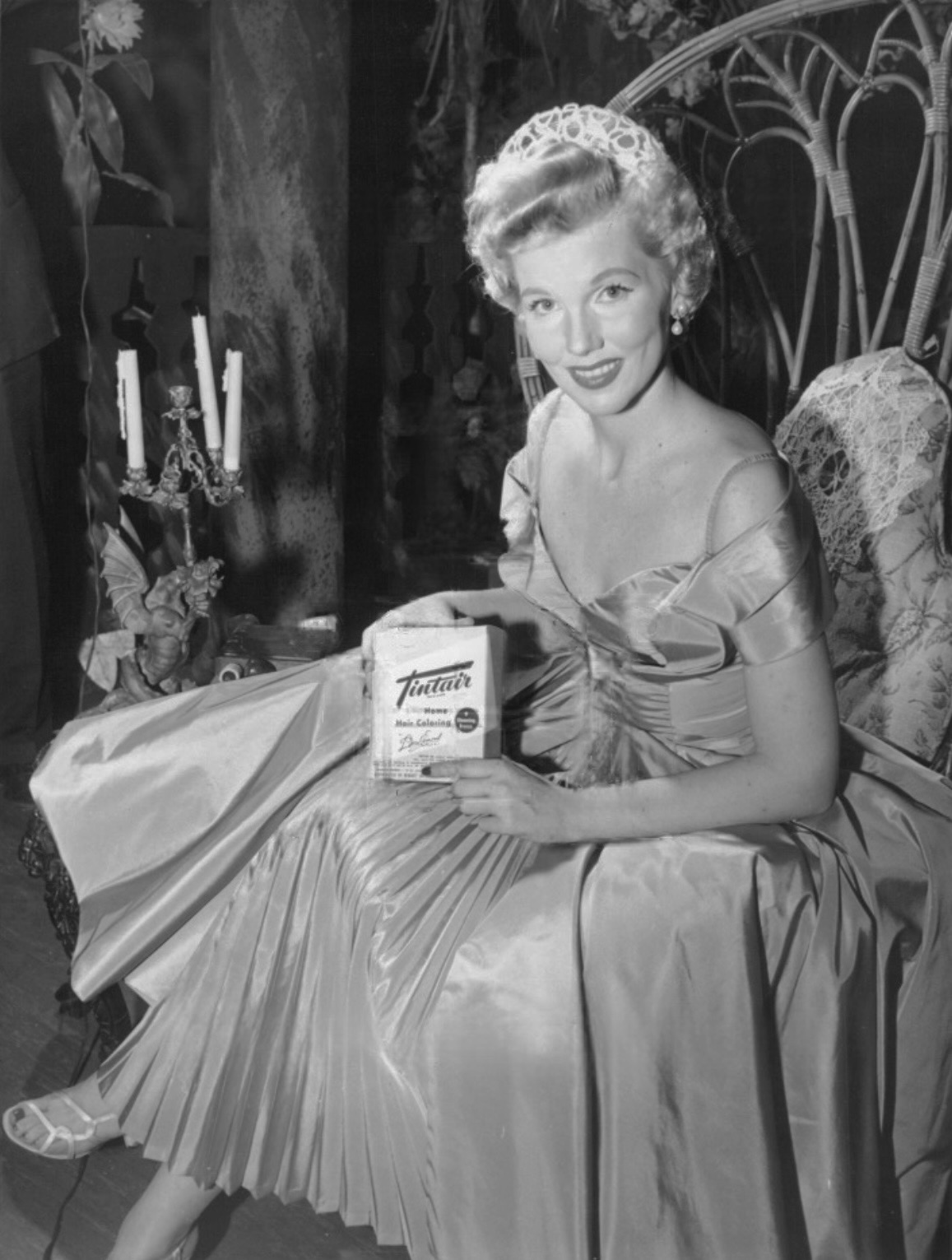
- Mathews in 1951
- Born: Jane Mathews; December 5, 1919; New York City, U.S.
- Died: January 17, 1999 (aged 79); Laguna Beach, California, U.S.
- Occupations: Actress, dancer, showgirl
- Years active: 1932–1951
- Spouses: Gonzales Gomez (m. 19??; div. 19??); Milton Berle (m. 1941; div. 1947); (m. 1949; div. 1950); Billy Rose (m. 1956; div. 1959); (m. 1961; div. 1963); Don Beddoe (m. 1974; died 1991)
- Children: 1 (adopted daughter)

Joyce Mathews (born Jane Mathews; December 5, 1919 – January 17, 1999) was an American actress, dancer, and showgirl who appeared in films, on Broadway, and in early television productions from the late 1930s through the 1950s. She was known for her stage and screen work as well as for her marriages to comedian Milton Berle, theatrical producer Billy Rose, and actor Don Beddoe.

== Early life ==
Mathews was born Jane Mathews on December 5, 1919, in New York City. She later attended the Ida M. Fisher School in Miami Beach, Florida, where she studied art before entering show business. She subsequently changed her first name from Jane to Joyce.

== Career ==
Mathews began her entertainment career in the late 1930s as a dancer at Nicky Blair’s Paradise nightclub in New York.

She appeared in several motion pictures, including The Big Broadcast of 1938 and Artists and Models Abroad (1938). Additional film credits included All Women Have Secrets (1939), Sudden Money (1939), and Mister Universe (1951).

On Broadway, she appeared in the musical Hold On to Your Hats, associated with Al Jolson. By the early 1950s, she was also working in television.

She was often described variously as a “showgirl” and an “actress,” reflecting her work across nightclub, stage, and screen productions.

== Personal life ==
Her first marriage was to Gonzales Gomez.

Mathews married comedian Milton Berle on December 5, 1941, in Beverly Hills, California. The couple divorced in 1947, remarried in June 1949, and divorced again in 1950 in the Virgin Islands. They adopted a daughter, Victoria.

In July 1951, Mathews was hospitalized following a reported suicide attempt at the New York apartment of theatrical producer Billy Rose. Rose at the time was still married to Eleanor Holm.

Mathews married Rose July 2, 1956 and they divorced July 23, 1959. They then remarried on December 29, 1961, only to divorce again on February 10, 1964, exactly two years before he died.

In 1974, Mathews married actor Don Beddoe.

By 1977, she owned and operated a travel agency in California.

Mathews lived in California in her later years. She died on January 17, 1999, in Laguna Beach, California, at the age of 79.

== Filmography ==
=== Film ===
Year	Title	Role	Notes
1932	Jewel Robbery	Maid	Uncredited
1933	Sitting Pretty	Blonde Chorus Girl	Uncredited
1936	College Holiday	Dancer	Uncredited
1936	The Champ's a Chump	Student	Uncredited (Short)
1937	Wells Fargo	Pioneer Girl	Uncredited
1937	Daughter of Shanghai	Girl	Uncredited
1937	Bulldog Drummond's Revenge	Minor Role	Uncredited
1937	True Confession	Girl in Cocktail Lounge	Uncredited
1937	Thrill of a Lifetime	Chorus Girl	Uncredited
1938	Bluebeard's Eighth Wife	Undetermined Role	Uncredited
1938	Dangerous to Know	Minor Role	Uncredited
1938	Tip-Off Girls	Tessie	Uncredited
1938	The Big Broadcast of 1938	Chorus Girl	Uncredited
1938	The Buccaneer	Undetermined Role	Uncredited
1938	Artists and Models Abroad	Jersey	
1938	Arrest Bulldog Drummond	Undetermined Secondary Role	Uncredited
1938	Say It in French	Girl	Uncredited
1938	The Arkansas Traveler	Girl	Uncredited
1938	Sing You Sinners	Hat-Check Girl	Uncredited
1938	You and Me	Sales Clerk	Uncredited
1938	Cocoanut Grove	Dancer	Uncredited
1938	College Swing	Student	Uncredited
1939	Midnight	Girl	Uncredited
1939	King of Chinatown	Nightclub Girl	Uncredited
1939	Cafe Society	Girl	Uncredited
1939	St. Louis Blues	Dancer	Uncredited
1939	Boy Trouble	Patricia Fitch	
1939	Disbarred	Cigarette Girl	Uncredited
1939	All Women Have Secrets	Peggy	
1939	$1,000 a Touchdown	Lorelei	
1939	Honeymoon in Bali	Girl with Umbrella	Uncredited
1939	Night Work	Patricia Fitch	
1939	Million Dollar Legs	Bunny Maxwell	
1939	Sudden Money	Yolo	
1939	I'm from Missouri	Bit Role	Uncredited
1940	The Way of All Flesh	Telegraph Girl	Uncredited
1940	Those Were the Days!	Telephone Operator	Uncredited
1941	Ball of Fire	Chorus Girl	Uncredited
1947	A Double Life	Janet	Uncredited
1949	The Barkleys of Broadway	Genevieve	Uncredited
1951	Mister Universe	Maroni's Moll	

=== Television ===
Year	Title	Role	Notes
1950	Armstrong Circle Theatre	Episode appearance	1 episode
1950	The Silver Theatre	Episode appearance	1 episode
1951	Somerset Maugham TV Theatre	Hostess	1 episode
