= Flesh Feast =

Flesh Feast may refer to:

- Flesh Feat (film)
- Flesh Feast (video game)
