= John S. Detlie =

American art director, set designer (1908–2005)

- Born: John Stewart Detlie; December 23, 1908; Sioux Falls, South Dakota, U.S.
- Died: November 30, 2005 (aged 96); Westlake Village, California, U.S.
- Occupation: Art director
- Spouses: Veronica Lake (m. 1940; div. 1943) Virginia Crowell (m. 1947)
- Children: 4

John Stewart Detlie (December 23, 1908 – November 30, 2005) was an American motion picture art director, set designer, and architect.

== Background ==
Detlie was born on December 23, 1908 in Sioux Falls, South Dakota. He received an undergraduate degree in engineering from the University of Alabama and a Master of Architecture degree from the University of Pennsylvania. His brother, Stanley Detlie, was a set designer in the 1930s and 1940s.

== Career ==
After graduation, Detlie spent a short time working in the office of Albert Kahn in Philadelphia. Detlie then moved to Hollywood and spent seven years working for the movie industry. He was nominated for an Academy Award in 1941 for Best Art Direction for the film Bitter Sweet.

Detlie served in the Army in World War II, including directing the camouflage of Boeing Plant 2 in Seattle. After the war, he remained in Seattle and established a career in architecture, designing Temple de Hirsch Sinai in Seattle and a number of large churches and parts of downtown Honolulu. He was an accomplished artist in water colors, acrylics, and oils.

== Death ==
Detlie died of lung cancer in Westlake Village, California on November 30, 2005, aged 96.
