= Veronica Lake =

American actress (1922–1973)

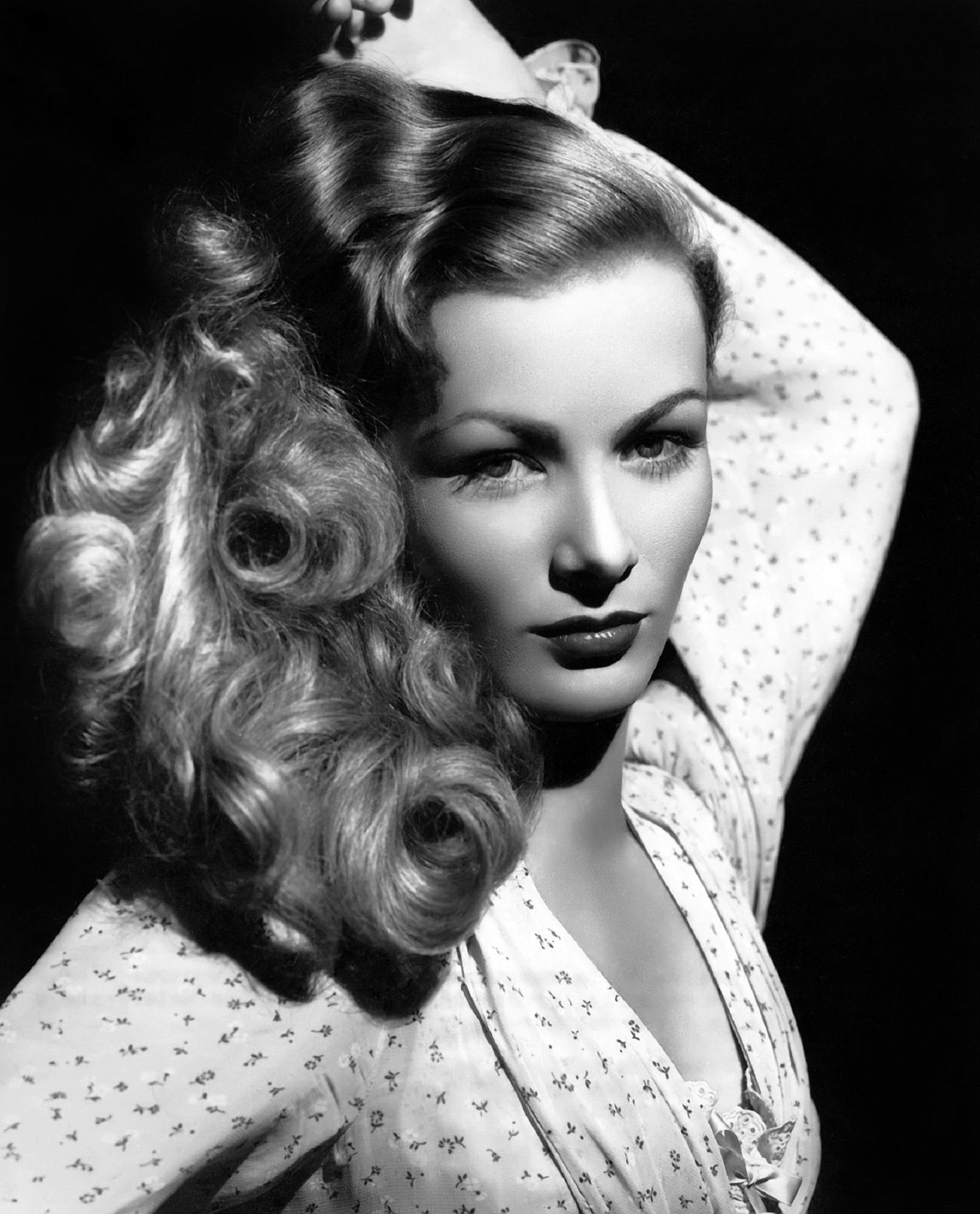
- Lake, c. 1952
- Born: Constance Frances Marie Ockelman; November 14, 1922; New York City, U.S.
- Died: July 7, 1973 (aged 50); Burlington, Vermont, U.S.
- Other names: Constance Keane; Connie Keane
- Occupation: Actress
- Years active: 1939–1970
- Spouses: John S. Detlie (m. 1940; div. 1943) Andre de Toth (m. 1944; div. 1952) Joseph Allan McCarthy (m. 1955; div. 1959) Robert Carleton-Munro (m. 1972)
- Children: 4

Constance Frances Marie Ockelman (November 14, 1922 – July 7, 1973), known professionally as Veronica Lake, was an American film, stage, and television actress. Lake was best known for her femme fatale roles in films noir with Alan Ladd during the 1940s, her peek-a-boo hairstyle, and films such as Sullivan's Travels (1941) and I Married a Witch (1942). By the late 1940s, Lake's career began to decline, in part because of alcoholism. She made only one film in the 1950s, but had several guest appearances on television. She returned to the big screen in the film Footsteps in the Snow (1966), but the role failed to revitalize her career.

Lake's memoir, Veronica: The Autobiography of Veronica Lake, was published in 1970. Her final screen role was in a low-budget horror film, Flesh Feast (1970). After years of heavy drinking, Lake died at the age of 50 in July 1973, from hepatitis and acute kidney injury.

== Early life ==
Lake was born Constance Frances Marie Ockelman in the New York City borough of Brooklyn. Her father, Harry Eugene Ockelman, was of German and Irish descent, and worked for an oil company aboard a ship. He died in an oil tanker explosion in Marcus Hook, Pennsylvania. in 1932. Lake's mother, Constance Frances Charlotta (née Trimble), of Irish descent, in 1933 married Anthony Keane, a newspaper staff artist also of Irish descent, and Lake began using his surname.

The Keanes lived in Saranac Lake, New York, where young Lake attended St. Bernard's School. She was then sent to Villa Maria, an all-girls Catholic boarding school in Montreal, Canada, from which she was expelled. Lake later claimed she attended McGill University and took a premed course for a year, intending to become a surgeon. This claim was included in several press biographies, although Lake later admitted it was bogus. Lake subsequently apologized to the president of McGill, who was simply amused when she explained her habit of self-dramatizing. In 1936, the Keane family moved to Miami, Florida. Lake attended Miami High School, where she was known for her beauty. She had a troubled childhood and was diagnosed with schizophrenia, according to her mother.

== Career ==
=== Constance Keane ===
In 1938, the Keanes moved to Beverly Hills, California. While briefly under contract to MGM, Lake enrolled in that studio's acting farm, the Bliss-Hayden School of Acting (now the Beverly Hills Playhouse). She made friends with a girl named Gwen Horn and accompanied her when Horn went to audition at RKO. She appeared in the play Thought for Food in January 1939. A theatre critic from the Los Angeles Times called her "a fetching little trick" for her appearance in She Made Her Bed.

Lake's first appearance on screen was as an extra for RKO, playing a small role as one of several students in the film Sorority House (1939). The part wound up being cut from the film, but she was encouraged to continue. Similar roles followed, including All Women Have Secrets (1939), Dancing Co-Ed (also 1939), Young as You Feel (1940), and Forty Little Mothers (also 1940). Forty Little Mothers was the first time she let her hair down on screen.

=== Name change and stardom ===
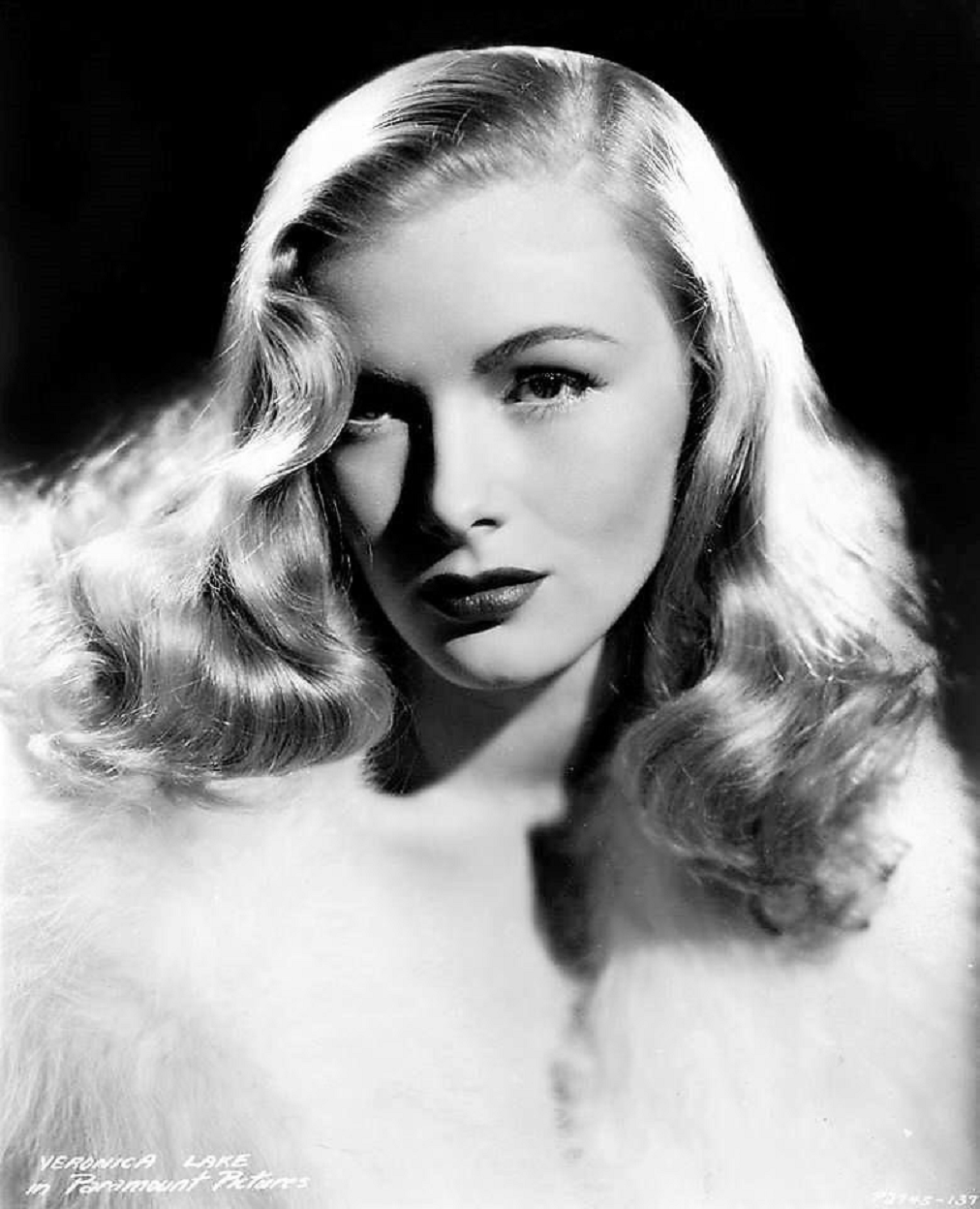
Publicity photo for I Wanted Wings (1941)

Lake attracted the interest of Fred Wilcox, an assistant director, who shot a test scene of her performing from a play and showed it to an agent. The agent, in turn, showed it to producer Arthur Hornblow Jr., who was looking for a new girl to play the part of a nightclub singer in a military drama, I Wanted Wings (1941). Hornblow changed the actress's name to Veronica Lake. According to him, her eyes, "calm and clear like a blue lake", were the inspiration for her new name.

The film became a big hit, and made the teenage Lake a star overnight; even before the film came out, Lake was dubbed "the find of 1941". During filming, Lake's long blonde hair accidentally fell over her right eye during a take and created a "peek-a-boo" effect. "I was playing a sympathetic drunk, I had my arm on a table ... it slipped ... and my hair – it was always baby fine and had this natural break – fell over my face ... It became my trademark and purely by accident", she recalled. The film's success influenced women to copy the style, which became Lake's trademark. However, Lake did not think this meant she would have a long career and maintained her goal was to be a surgeon. "Only the older actors keep on a long time ... I don't want to hang on after I've reached a peak. I'll go back to medical school", she said.

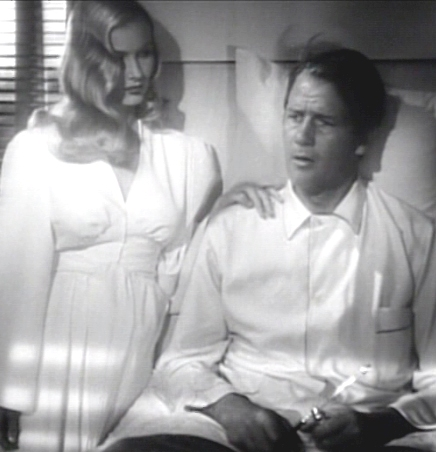
Lake with Joel McCrea in Sullivan's Travels (1941). As seen, she is sporting her peek-a-boo hairstyle, with her hair covering one of her eyes.

Paramount announced Lake to star in China Pass and a remake of Blonde Venus. Instead, she was cast in Preston Sturges's Sullivan's Travels with Joel McCrea; and film noir This Gun for Hire (1942) with Robert Preston and Alan Ladd. Her scenes with Ladd in the latter became popular with audiences, prompting Paramount to reteam them in The Glass Key, with Lake replacing Patricia Morison in the leading role. Lake was meant to be reunited with McCrea in the comedy I Married a Witch, but his withdrawal from the project led to a delay in production; Fredric March was eventually cast as his replacement. Both films were highly successful, but also prevented a reunion with Hornblow for Hong Kong in which she was meant to co-star with Charles Boyer.

The trailer for Sullivan's Travels

Upon the United States' entrance into World War II, Lake traveled throughout the United States to raise money for war bonds. She also became a popular pin-up girl for soldiers, and participated in awareness campaigns to help decrease accidents involving women getting their hair caught in machinery. Lake's only 1943 releases were both patriotic-themed. She made an appearance in Paramount's all-star musical revue Star Spangled Rhythm performing "A Sweater, Sarong and a Peek-A-Boo Bang" with Paulette Goddard and Dorothy Lamour. Her only film of the year was So Proudly We Hail! (1943) with Goddard and Claudette Colbert, in which she received acclaim for her role of a suicidal nurse. At the peak of her career, she was earning $4,500 a week.

=== Personal struggles and box-office disappointments ===
Despite her initial success, Lake suffered a series of setbacks that ultimately derailed her career. Her complex personality quickly led to her acquiring a reputation for being difficult to work with. On Sullivan's Travels, Lake did not disclose she was six months pregnant when filming began, upsetting director Preston Sturges to the point he had to be physically restrained. Lake also clashed with co-star McCrea to the point that he dropped out of I Married a Witch, reportedly saying that "Life's too short for two films with Veronica Lake" (although he did later go on to work with her in Ramrod (1947)). His replacement Fredric March also clashed with Lake after he made crude remarks about her during pre-production. Eddie Bracken was quoted as saying, "She was known as 'The Bitch' and she deserved the title." I Married A Witch director René Clair had a differing view of Lake, saying "She was a very gifted girl, but she didn't believe she was gifted." Lake's behavior eventually spilt over into public view during a publicity stunt in which Lake's services as a dishwasher and revue performer were auctioned off for war bonds. One paper claimed Lake's "talk was on the grim side", while columnist Hedda Hopper claimed that "Lake clipped her own wings in her Boston bond appearance ... It's lucky for Lake, after Boston, that she isn't out of pictures".

With her role in The Hour Before the Dawn (1944), Lake changed her trademark hairstyle to encourage women working in war industry factories to adopt more practical, safer hairstyles. Lake had done so at the urging of the government to help decrease accidents involving women getting their hair caught in machinery. The film was not a success; Lake's image change and her unsympathetic role of Nazi spy Dora Bruckman earned negative reviews.

In late 1943, Lake took time off after undergoing a series of personal struggles. After tripping on a lighting cable while on the set of The Hour Before Dawn, Lake went into premature delivery and gave birth to a son who died shortly after birth. Within weeks, Lake had also filed for divorce from her husband. Lake also began drinking more heavily during this time.

Upon returning to work in 1944, Lake took stock of her career, claiming, "I had to learn about acting. I've played all sorts of parts, taken just what came along regardless of high merit. In fact, I've been a sort of general utility person. I haven't liked all the roles. One or two were pretty bad". Lake also expressed interest in renegotiating her deal with Paramount:

The studio feels that way about it too. They have indicated they are going to fuss more about the pictures in which I appear. I think I'll enjoy being fussed about ... I want this to be the turning point and I think that it will. I am free and clear of unpleasant characters, unless they are strongly justified. I've had a varied experience playing them and also appearing as heroines. The roles themselves haven't been noteworthy and sometimes not even especially spotlighted, but I think they've all been beneficial in one way or another. From here on there should be a certain pattern of development, and that is what I am going to fight for if necessary, though I don't believe it will be because they are so understanding here at Paramount.

Lake returned with roles in the musical Bring On the Girls (1945) with Eddie Bracken and Sonny Tufts; and Hold That Blonde with Bracken. Lake enjoyed making the film, saying "it's a comedy, rather like what Carole Lombard used to do ... It represents a real change of pace". However, neither film was successful, as were minor roles in Out of This World and Miss Susie Slagle's (1946).

=== Final years at Paramount and freelance ===
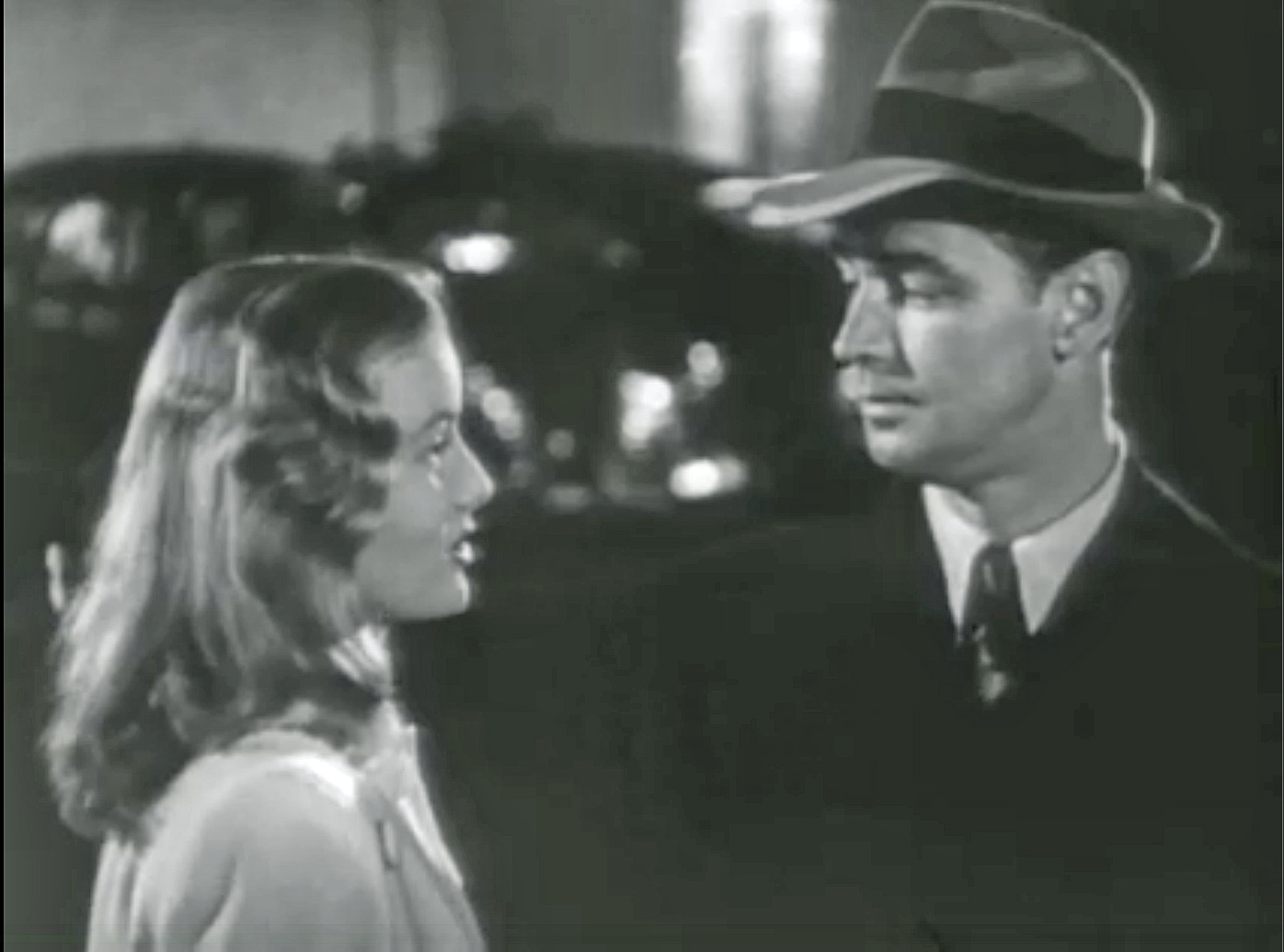
Lake and Alan Ladd in trailer for The Blue Dahlia (1946)

After her role in Miss Susie Slagle's, producer John Houseman cast Lake in the film noir The Blue Dahlia (1946). The film reunited her with Alan Ladd, who had become one of Paramount's top stars since their last pairing in The Glass Key. Lake was pleased with the role, but her performance in the film did not impress its screenwriter Raymond Chandler, who referred to her as "Moronica Lake". Nonetheless, it became her first success since So Proudly We Hail! and the largest of her career.

For the first time in her career, Lake ventured outside of Paramount with the United Artists Western Ramrod (1947). The film was directed by her then-husband Andre de Toth, in their first collaboration. The film also reunited her with Joel McCrea, despite his earlier insistence that he would not work with her again. The film was also successful, continuing her comeback.

Following a cameo in Variety Girl (1947), Lake and Ladd reunited again for the crime film Saigon (1948). Lake returned to her former peek-a-boo hairstyle for the film, which unlike their previous films was not a noir. Reaction to the film was mixed; although financial success, it received a more mixed critical reception in comparison to the couple's earlier vehicles. Coupled with the flops The Sainted Sisters and Isn't It Romantic, Paramount opted not to renew Lake's contract in 1948.

Following her release from Paramount, Lake took a top supporting role in Slattery's Hurricane (1949). The film, directed by de Toth, was released by 20th Century Fox. She also appeared with Zachary Scott in the Western Stronghold (1951). Shot in Mexico for Lippert Pictures, Lake later described the film as "a dog" and sued for unpaid wages on the film.

Lake and de Toth announced plans to make Flanagan Boy and Before I Wake, the latter from a suspense novel by Mel Devrett. However, neither were made as the couple ran into financial difficulties. In April 1951, the IRS seized their home for unpaid taxes. Later that same year, Lake and de Toth filed for bankruptcy. Bankrupt and on the verge of a nervous breakdown, Lake left de Toth and flew alone to New York. Reflecting on her departure years later, Lake said:

"They said, 'She'll be back in a couple of months,'" recalled Lake. "Well I never returned. Enough was enough already. Did I want to be one of the walking dead or a real person?"

Lake performed in summer stock theatre and in stage roles in England. In October 1955, she collapsed in Detroit, where she had been appearing on stage in The Little Hut.

== Later years ==
After her third divorce, Lake drifted between cheap hotels in New York City, and was arrested several times for public drunkenness and disorderly conduct. In 1962, a New York Post reporter found her living at the all-women's Martha Washington Hotel in Manhattan, working as a waitress downstairs in the cocktail lounge. She was working under the name "Connie de Toth". Lake said she took the job in part because "I like people. I like to talk to them".

The reporter's widely distributed story led to speculation that Lake was destitute. After the story ran, fans of Lake sent her money which she returned as "a matter of pride". Lake vehemently denied that she was destitute and stated, "It's as though people were making me out to be down-and-out. I wasn't. I was paying $190 a month rent then, and that's a long way from being broke". The story did revive some interest in Lake and led to some television and stage appearances, including the 1963 off-Broadway revival of the musical Best Foot Forward.

In 1966, she had a brief employment as a hostess on a TV show in Baltimore, Maryland, along with a largely ignored film role in Footsteps in the Snow. She also continued appearing in stage roles. She went to Freeport in the Bahamas to visit a friend and stayed on, living there for a few years.

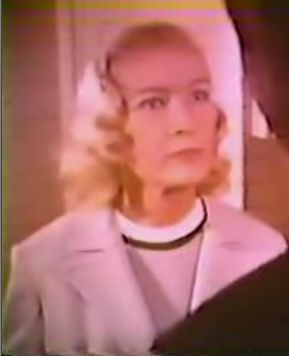
Lake in Flesh Feast (1970), her final film

Lake's memoirs, Veronica: The Autobiography of Veronica Lake, which she dictated to writer Donald Bain, were published in the United Kingdom in 1969 and in the United States the following year. In the book, Lake discusses her career, her failed marriages; romances with Howard Hughes, Tommy Manville and Aristotle Onassis; her alcoholism; and her guilt over not spending enough time with her children. In the book, Lake stated to Bain that her mother pushed her into a career as an actress. Bain quoted Lake, looking back at her career, as saying, "I never did cheesecake like Ann Sheridan or Betty Grable. I just used my hair". She also laughed off the term "sex symbol" and instead referred to herself as a "sex zombie".

When she visited the UK to promote her book in 1969, she received an offer to appear on stage in Madam Chairman. Also in 1969, Lake essayed the role of Blanche DuBois in a revival of A Streetcar Named Desire on the English stage; her performance won rave reviews. With the proceeds from her autobiography, after she had divided them with Bain, she co-produced and starred in her final film, Flesh Feast (1970), a low-budget horror movie with a Nazi-myth storyline.

== Personal life ==
Lake's first marriage was to art director John S. Detlie, in 1940. They had a daughter and a son. According to news from the time, Lake's son was born prematurely after she tripped on a lighting cable while filming a movie. Lake's son died in 1943. Lake and Detlie separated in August 1943 and divorced in December 1943.

In 1944, Lake married film director Andre de Toth with whom she had a son and a daughter. Days before her daughter's birth, Lake's mother sued her for support payments. After purchasing an airplane for de Toth, Lake earned her pilot's license in 1946. She later flew solo between Los Angeles and New York when leaving him. Lake and de Toth divorced in 1952.

In September 1955, she married songwriter Joseph Allan McCarthy. They were divorced in 1959.

In 1969, she revealed that she rarely saw her children.

Her last marriage was in June 1972 in England to Royal Navy captain Robert Carleton-Munro; however, the marriage lasted just for a year, Lake returning alone to the US in June 1973.

== Death ==
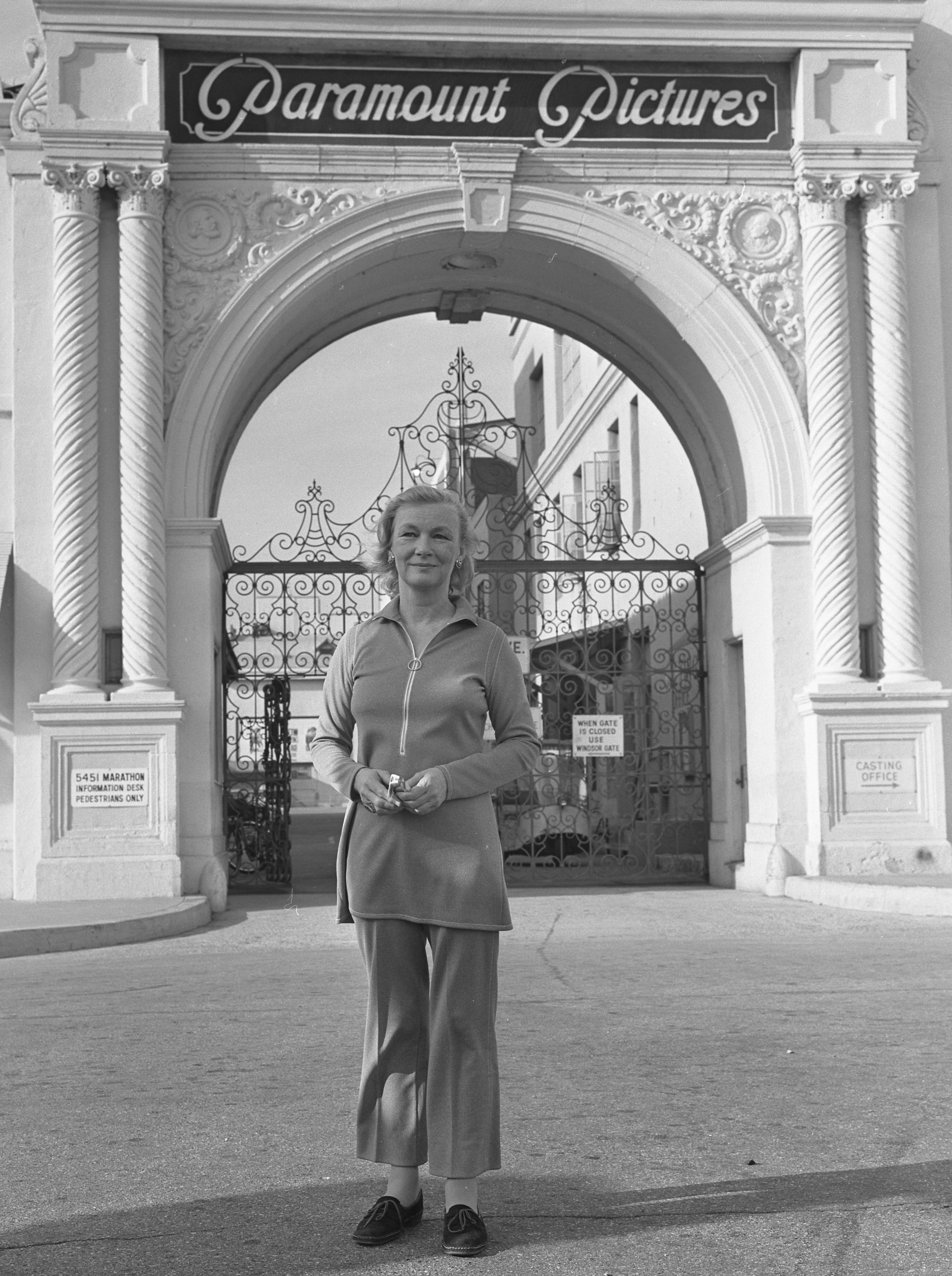
Lake outside the gates of Paramount Pictures in 1971, two years prior to her death

In June 1973, Lake returned from her autobiography promotion and summer stock tour in England to the United States and, while traveling in Vermont, visited a local doctor complaining of stomach pains. She was discovered to have cirrhosis of the liver as a result of her years of drinking, and on June 26, she checked into the University of Vermont Medical Center in Burlington.

She died there on July 7, 1973, of acute hepatitis and acute kidney injury. One of her sons claimed her body. Lake's memorial service was held at the Universal Chapel in New York City on July 11.

She was cremated and, according to her wishes, her ashes were scattered off the coast of the Virgin Islands. In 2004, some of Lake's ashes were reportedly found in a New York antique store.

== Legacy ==
For her contribution to the motion picture industry, Lake has a star on the Hollywood Walk of Fame at 6918 Hollywood Boulevard.

== Filmography ==
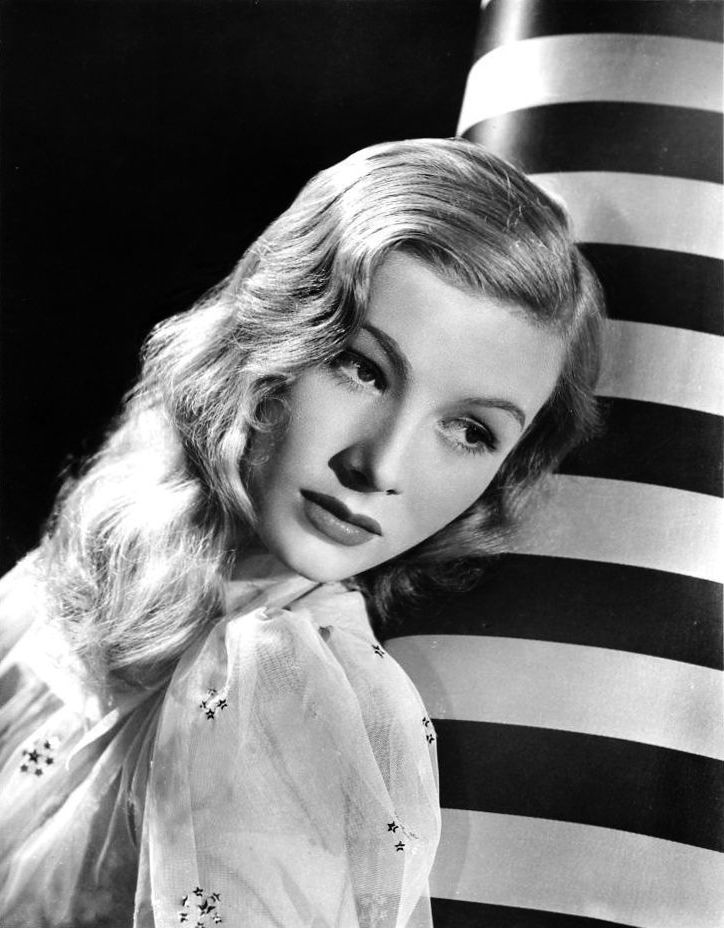
Lake, c. 1940s

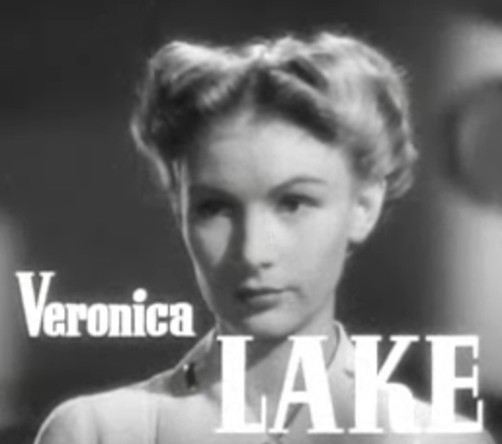
Lake sporting a different hairstyle to the peek-a-boo one in So Proudly We Hail (1943)

Film
Year	Title	Role	Notes
1939	Sorority House	Student	Uncredited, alternative title: That Girl from College
1939	The Wrong Room	The Attorney's New Bride	Credited as Connie Keane
1939	Dancing Co-Ed	One of a Couple on a Motorcycle	Uncredited; Alternative title: Every Other Inch a Lady
1939	All Women Have Secrets	Jane	Credited as Constance Keane
1940	Young as You Feel	Bit part	Credited as Constance Keane
1940	Forty Little Mothers	Granville girl	Uncredited
1941	I Wanted Wings	Sally Vaughn	First featured role
1941	Hold Back the Dawn	Movie Actress	Uncredited
1941	Sullivan's Travels	The Girl	Directed by Preston Sturges
1942	This Gun for Hire	Ellen Graham	First film with Alan Ladd
1942	The Glass Key	Janet Henry	With Alan Ladd
1942	I Married a Witch	Jennifer	Directed by René Clair
1942	Star Spangled Rhythm	Herself	One of a number of Paramount stars making cameos
1943	So Proudly We Hail!	Lt. Olivia D'Arcy	
1944	The Hour Before the Dawn	Dora Bruckmann	
1945	Bring On the Girls	Teddy Collins	
1945	Out of This World	Dorothy Dodge	
1945	Duffy's Tavern	Herself	One of a number of Paramount stars making cameos
1945	Hold That Blonde	Sally Martin	
1946	Miss Susie Slagle's	Nan Rogers	
1946	The Blue Dahlia	Joyce Harwood	With Alan Ladd
1947	Ramrod	Connie Dickason	Directed by her then-husband Andre de Toth; first film made outside Paramount since becoming a star
1947	Variety Girl	Herself	One of a number of Paramount stars making cameos
1948	Saigon	Susan Cleaver	Last film with Alan Ladd
1948	The Sainted Sisters	Letty Stanton	
1948	Isn't It Romantic	Candy Cameron	
1949	Slattery's Hurricane	Dolores Greaves	Directed by André de Toth
1951	Stronghold	Mary Stevens	
1966	Footsteps in the Snow	Therese	
1970	Flesh Feast	Dr. Elaine Frederick	Alternative title: Time Is Terror

Television
Year	Title	Role	Notes
1950	Your Show of Shows	Herself – Guest Performer	Episode #2.11
1950	Lights Out	Mercy Device	Episode: "Beware This Woman"
1950–1953	Lux Video Theatre	Various	3 episodes
1951	Somerset Maugham TV Theatre	Valerie	Episode: "The Facts of Life"
1952	Celanese Theatre	Abby Fane	Episode: "Brief Moment"
1952	Tales of Tomorrow	Paula	Episode: "Flight Overdue"
1952	Goodyear Television Playhouse	Judy "Leni" Howard	Episode: "Better Than Walking"
1953	Danger		Episode: "Inside Straight"
1954	Broadway Television Theatre	Nancy Willard	Episode: "The Gramercy Ghost"

== Selected stage credits ==
Theatre
Play	Venue	Her run
Thought for Food	Bliss Hayden Theatre, Beverly Hills	1939: January–February
She Made Her Bed	Bliss Hayden Theatre, Beverly Hills	1939: July–August
Private Confusion	Bliss Hayden Theatre, Beverly Hills	1940: October
Direct Hit		1944: June
The Voice of the Turtle	Atlanta	1951: February
The Curtain Rises	Olney Theatre	1951
Peter Pan	Road tour	1951
Brief Moment		1952
Gramercy Hill		1952
Masquerade	Walnut Street Theatre, Philadelphia	1953
The Little Hut	Road tour, including: Erlanger Theatre, Buffalo; Murat Theatre, Indianapolis; Shubert Theatre, Detroit; Shubert Theatre, Cincinnati	1955: September; October
Bell Book and Candle		1956
Fair Game	Road tour, including: Arena Playhouse, Atlanta; Hinsdale Strawhatter, Chicago	1959: July
Best Foot Forward	Stage 73 (Off-Broadway), Manhattan	1963
Madam Chairman	Tour of English provinces	1969
A Streetcar Named Desire	New Theatre, Bromley	1969

== In popular culture ==
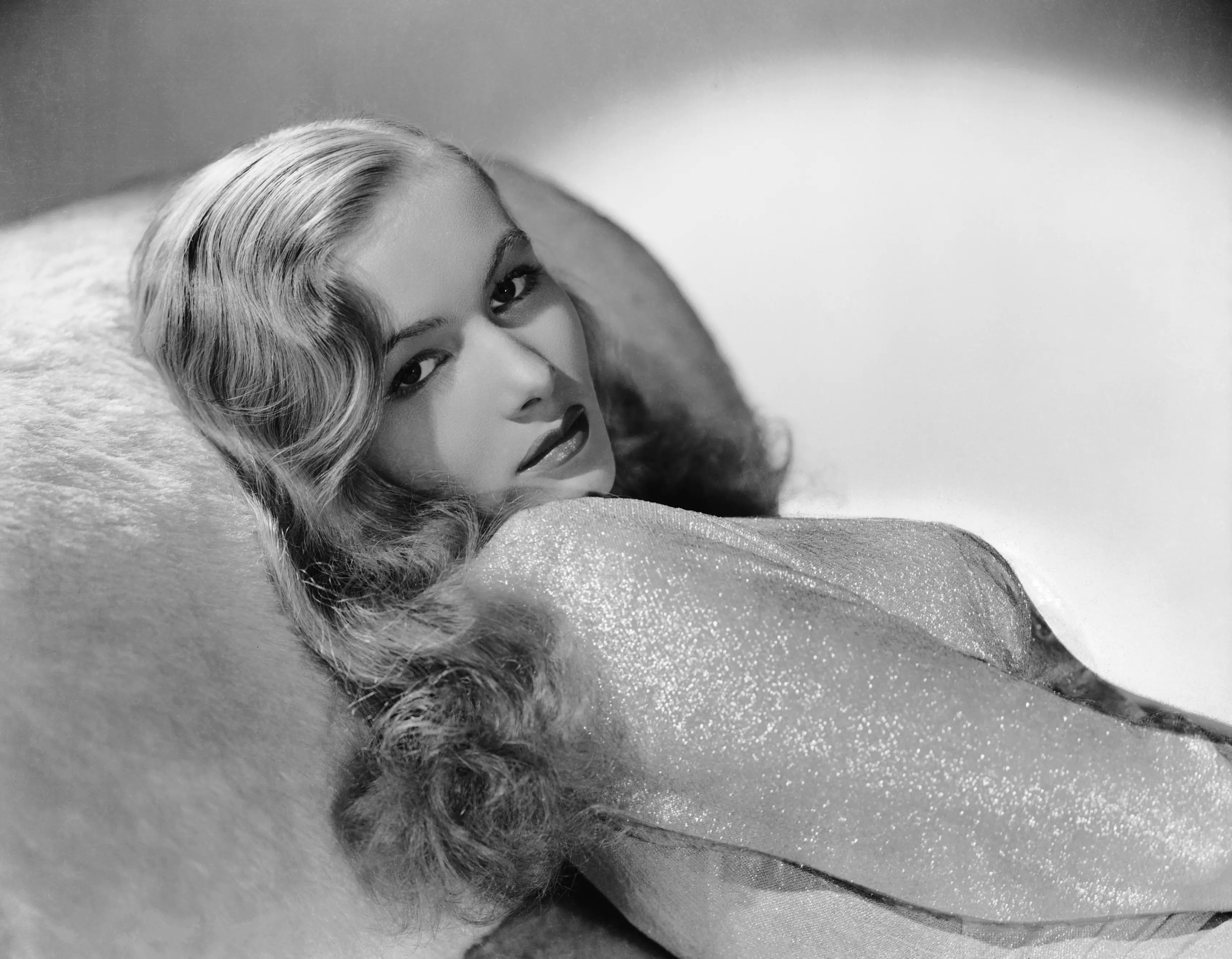
Veronica Lake circa 1950

Clips from her role in The Glass Key (1942) were integrated into the 1982 film Dead Men Don't Wear Plaid as character Monica Stillpond.

Lake was one of the models for the animated character Jessica Rabbit in the 1988 film Who Framed Roger Rabbit?, especially for her hairstyle.

In the 1997 film L.A. Confidential, Kim Basinger won the Academy Award for Best Supporting Actress for her portrayal of a prostitute who is a Veronica Lake look-alike.

A geographical feature called "Lake Veronica" was a recurring joke in the Rocky and Bullwinkle series and film.

In the video game BioShock Infinite: Burial at Sea (2013–14), the visual style of the character Elizabeth was inspired by Veronica Lake's femme fatale roles.

In April 2023, Sparks released "Veronica Lake", a single from their album The Girl Is Crying in Her Latte. The song describes how Lake was asked to change her hairstyle so that women on the war assembly lines who imitated it wouldn't harm themselves by catching their hair in the machinery, and that, by agreeing to do so, she voluntarily gave up much of the popularity that she had gained by her distinctive hairstyle.

== Radio appearances ==
Date	Program	Episode/source
March 30, 1943	Lux Radio Theater	I Wanted Wings
February 9, 1943	Bob Hope	Guest star Paulette Goddard and Veronica Lake
February 16, 1943	Burns and Allen	Guest star Veronica Lake
November 1, 1943	Lux Radio Theater	So Proudly We Hail!
January 8, 1944	Command Performance	Guest star Veronica Lake
February 18, 1945	Charlie McCarthy	Guest stars Ginny Simms and Veronica Lake
April 2, 1945	The Screen Guild Theater	This Gun for Hire
November 18, 1946	Lux Radio Theatre	O.S.S.
April 20, 1947	Exploring the Unknown	The Dark Curtain
April 21, 1949	The Screen Guild Theater	The Blue Dahlia
March 6, 1950	Lux Radio Theatre	Slattery's Hurricane
December 15, 1950	Duffy's Tavern	"Archie Wants Veronica Lake to Help Promote a New Latin Singer"
December 12, 1954	The Jack Benny Program	"A Trip to Palm Springs"
