= Dr. Cyclops =

1940 film by Ernest B. Schoedsack

- Theatrical release poster
- Directed by: Ernest B. Schoedsack
- Written by: Tom Kilpatrick; Malcolm Stuart Boylan (uncredited)
- Produced by: Dale Van Every; Merian C. Cooper
- Starring: Albert Dekker; Thomas Coley; Janice Logan; Charles Halton; Victor Kilian
- Cinematography: Henry Sharp
- Edited by: Ellsworth Hoagland
- Music by: Gerard Carbonara; Albert Hay Malotte; Ernst Toch
- Color process: Technicolor
- Production company: Paramount Pictures
- Distributed by: Paramount Pictures
- Release date: April 12, 1940
- Running time: 77 minutes
- Country: United States
- Language: English

Dr. Cyclops is a 1940 American science fiction horror film from Paramount Pictures, produced by Dale Van Every and Merian C. Cooper, directed by Ernest B. Schoedsack, and starring Thomas Coley, Victor Kilian, Janice Logan, Charles Halton, Frank Yaconelli and Albert Dekker.

The film was nominated for an Oscar for Best Visual Effects (by Farciot Edouart and Gordon Jennings) at the 13th Academy Awards.

Fantasy and science fiction writer Henry Kuttner wrote a novelette adapting the film's story that appeared in the June 1940 issue of the pulp magazine Thrilling Wonder Stories.

== Plot ==
In his primitive laboratory somewhere in the Peruvian jungle, mad scientist Alexander Thorkel attempts to shrink all of humanity to reduce its impact on the environment. At one point, he summons a team of expert biologists from America to examine a specimen in his microscope, since his eyesight is too poor for him to do so himself. One of them identifies iron crystal contamination, much to Thorkel's satisfaction. He then thanks them for their services and asks them to leave. Annoyed that they have travelled thousands of miles for nothing, they set up camp in Thorkel's stockade. There, they discover the area is rich with pitchblende, an ore of uranium and radium. Thorkel reveals he is shrinking living creatures, using radiation piped in from a radium deposit down a deep shaft. He invites the biologists to observe his apparatus, then locks them inside his radiation chamber, where they are shrunk to twelve inches in height.

Later, when Thorkel discovers their shrunken state is only temporary, he angrily suffocates one of them. The rest flee into the jungle. He sets out to hunt them down so they cannot report him to the authorities. After he shoots one of them, the other fugitives hide in one of Thorkel's specimen cases and are brought back undetected to his lab. There, they conspire to kill Thorkel with his own shotgun when he lies down on his bed. Instead he falls asleep at his desk. They do manage to smash one lens of his glasses before he awakens. Thorkel chases the shrunken group to the mineshaft and is left hanging by a rope when a plank he is lying on breaks. One of them cuts the rope, and Thorkel plunges to his death. In time, the survivors are restored to their original size and begin their trek back to America.

== Cast ==
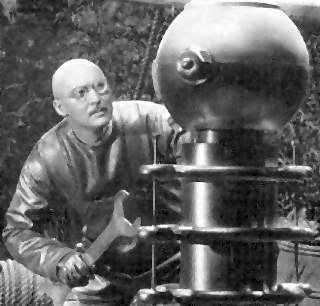
Albert Dekker as Dr. Thorkel

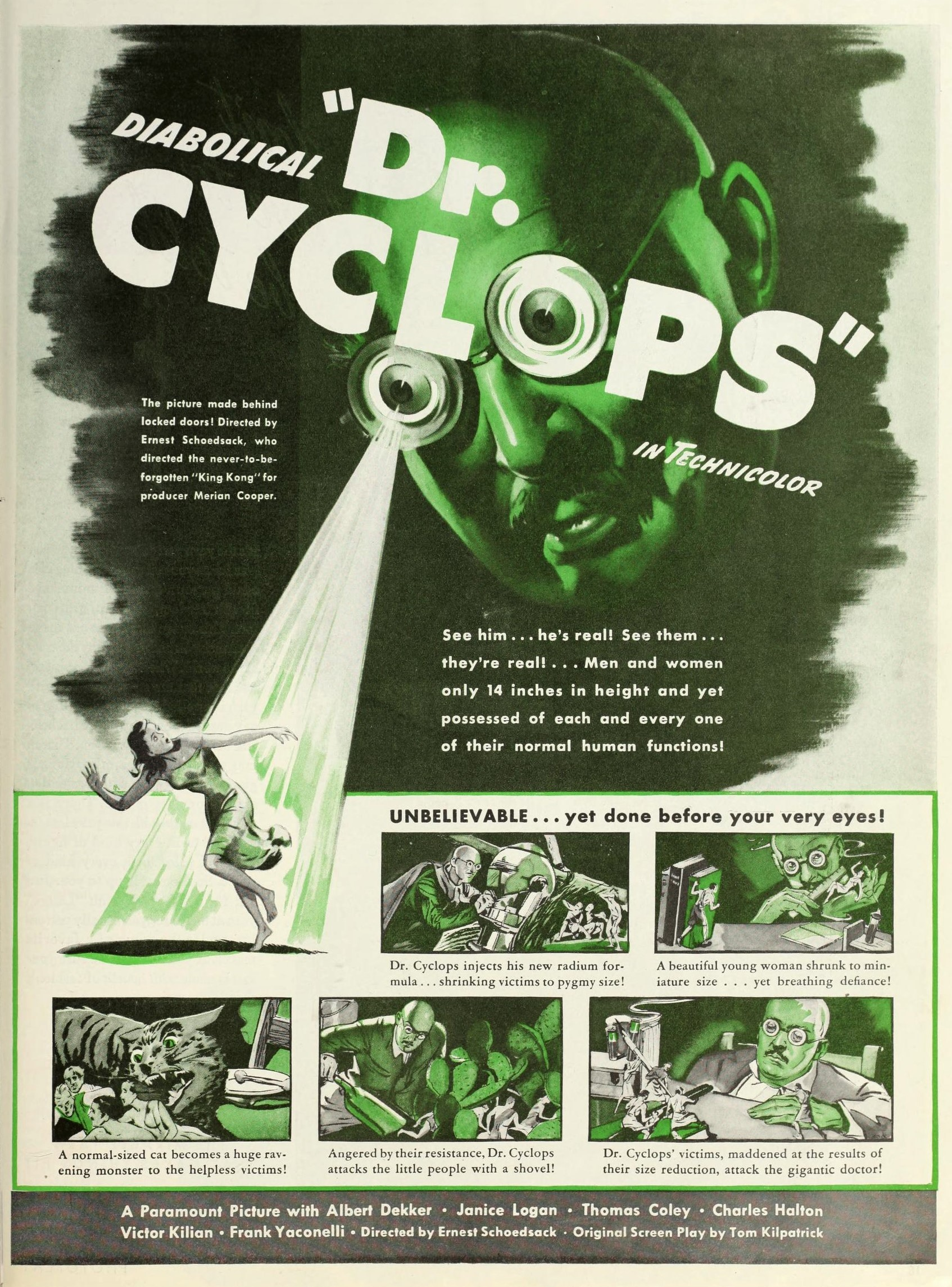
Magazine advertisement (1940)

- Albert Dekker as Dr. Alexander Thorkel
- Thomas Coley as Bill Stockton
- Janice Logan as Dr. Mary Robinson
- Charles Halton as Dr. Rupert Bulfinch
- Victor Kilian as Steve Baker
- Frank Yaconelli as Pedro Caroz
- Paul Fix as Dr. Mendoza
- Frank Reicher as Professor Kendall

== Production ==
Dr. Cyclops was directed by Ernest B. Schoedsack, responsible a few years earlier for King Kong. Like that film, Dr. Cyclops features elaborate sets and special effects. It is the first American horror film made in full, three-strip Technicolor; Doctor X (1932) and Mystery of the Wax Museum (1933) were made using the earlier two-color process. Schoedsack took special care to make certain that the color effects were believable.

== Reception ==
=== Critical response ===
Variety gave the film a negative review, calling the film "dull" and criticizing the film's direction, story, and jumbled ideas. TV Guide awarded the film a mixed two out of four stars, noting the film's "novel" special effects, but felt that the film 'wasted the opportunity to explore its subject'.

Time Out London gave the film a mostly positive review, calling it "An engaging fantasy with brilliantly executed (though mostly rather unimaginative) special effects which look back to The Devil Doll and forward to The Incredible Shrinking Man. Let down by a dull supporting cast, but retrieved by the attractively pale, tremulous Technicolor." Dennis Schwartz from Ozus' World Movie Reviews rated the film a grade B+, commending Dekker's performance while also noting that the film was "one of those bad films that is good because it's so much fun, and its noteworthy trick photography is effectively used for its dazzling special effects – way before the use of CGI".

Film historian John Brosnan has written of Dr. Cyclops: "It's a fast-paced, inventive film though the dialogue is awful and the acting is undistinguished with the exception of Albert Dekker's portrayal of Dr Thorkel. As with Charles Laughton's version of Dr. Moreau, his evil is not a byproduct of scientific zeal but a deliberate choice of action. The special effects deserve a mention, being ingeniously contrived and rather convincing, but the film is also noteworthy for its two unintentional references to the war that was about to engulf the world and end with the prospect of a nuclear apocalypse – Thorkel draws the power for his device from a 'radium mine' and, with his shaven head and thick, round glasses, he resembles the wartime caricature of the 'beastly Jap'".

== Home media ==
Universal Studios Home Entertainment released it on DVD in 2007 as part of a boxed set called The Classic Sci-Fi Ultimate Collection Vol. 2, along with The Land Unknown, The Leech Woman, The Deadly Mantis and Cult of the Cobra.

== See also ==
- List of films featuring miniature people
