= The Shanghai Story =

1954 film by Frank Lloyd

- Directed by: Frank Lloyd
- Screenplay by: Steve Fisher; Seton I. Miller
- Based on: a novel by Lester Yard
- Produced by: Frank Lloyd
- Starring: Ruth Roman; Edmond O'Brien; Richard Jaeckel
- Cinematography: Jack A. Marta
- Edited by: Tony Martinelli
- Music by: R. Dale Butts
- Production company: Republic Pictures
- Distributed by: Republic Pictures
- Release date: September 1, 1954 (United States)
- Running time: 90 minutes
- Country: United States
- Language: English

The Shanghai Story is a 1954 American film noir crime film directed by Frank Lloyd and starring Ruth Roman, Edmond O'Brien and Richard Jaeckel. It was based on a novel by Lester Yard. The film's sets were designed by the art director William Flannery. It was produced and distributed by Republic Pictures as one of the company's more prestigious releases.

== Plot ==
A number of people, the last Westerners in Shanghai, are interned in a hotel by Major Ling Wu and his men. The Chinese government refuses to let anyone go until identifying a spy in their midst. When an assassin named Sun Lee breaks into the hotel and tries to kill one of the hostages, Dan Maynard, a doctor, and Knuckles Greer, a sailor, manage to intervene.

Dan is confounded by the beautiful Rita King's seeming ability to come and go as she pleases. It becomes obvious that the police chief Colonel Zorek considers himself her protector.

Ling is so determined to frighten the captives into exposing the spy that he kills Sun Lee the would-be assassin right in front of them, just to prove how far he is prepared to go. Ling tries to rape a young newlywed, Leah De Verno, and cuts the rations so that the captives have barely enough food to stay alive. Some are killed or mysteriously led away.

Zorek propositions Rita if she will cooperate. Dan still doesn't know that she is being held against her will, just like everyone else. A young girl named Penny, daughter of another interned couple, requires emergency medical help and Dan appeals to his captors to permit him to operate on the child. The only way permission is granted is for Rita to grant Zorek her favors.

A captive named Paul Grant is discovered to have a hidden radio. He has received a coded message that a rescue submarine will be waiting nearby. Dan helps him attempt an escape, but before he leaves, Grant shares with Dan the coded information, just in case.

Grant is reported dead. Dan places the blame on Rita, presuming she tipped off Zorek how to capture and kill the spy. Dan finally becomes aware that Rita did not assist the police, and after he and Knuckles escape and meet the submarine, he goes back to her. By delivering a list of the captive Westerners along with Grant's coded information, Dan has embarrassed New China and ensured their release from the hotel. Zorek, summoned and assuming he will be rewarded, is instead punished for permitting the escape.

== Cast ==
- Ruth Roman as Rita King
- Edmond O'Brien as Dr. Dan Maynard
- Richard Jaeckel as 'Knuckles' Greer
- Barry Kelley as Ricki Dolmine
- Whit Bissell as Paul Grant
- Basil Ruysdael as Rev. Hollingsworth
- Marvin Miller as Colonel Zorek
- Yvette Duguay as Mrs. Leah De Verno
- Paul Picerni as Mr. Emilio De Verno
- Isabel Randolph as Mrs. Merryweather
- Philip Ahn as Major Ling Wu
- Frances Rafferty as Mrs. Warren
- Frank Ferguson as Mr. Haljerson
- James Griffith as Carl Hoyt
- John Alvin as Mr. Warren
- Frank Puglia as Mr. Chen
- Victor Sen Yung as Sun Lee
- Janine Perreau as Penny Warren
- Richard Loo as Junior Officer

== Bibliography ==
- Goble, Alan. The Complete Index to Literary Sources in Film. Walter de Gruyter, 1999.
