= Footsteps in the Snow =

- Directed by: Martin Green
- Written by: Dan Daniels; Martin Green
- Starring: George Carron; Melody Greer; Peter Kastner; Veronica Lake
- Cinematography: Guy Desbiens
- Edited by: André Desbiens
- Release date: October 27, 1966
- Running time: 90 minutes
- Country: Canada
- Language: English

Footsteps in the Snow is a 1966 low-budget Canadian thriller film directed by Martin Green and co-written by Green with Dan Daniels. The film features, in a minor role, Veronica Lake, in her penultimate film role, after 15 years away from the screen. The film was not released in the United States, and went largely unnoticed.
