= Mister Universe (film) =

1951 film

- Directed by: Joseph Lerner
- Written by: Searle Kramer
- Produced by: Rex Carlton; Joseph Lerner
- Starring: Jack Carson; Janis Paige; Vince Edwards
- Cinematography: Gerald Hirschfeld
- Edited by: Geraldine Lerner
- Music by: Dimitri Tiomkin
- Production company: Laurel Films
- Distributed by: Eagle-Lion Classics
- Release dates: March 22, 1951 (New York); April 18, 1951 (Los Angeles)
- Running time: 87 minutes
- Country: United States
- Language: English

Mister Universe is a 1951 American comedy film directed by Joseph Lerner and starring Jack Carson, Janis Paige and Vince Edwards. It was produced independently and distributed by Eagle-Lion Films. A number of professional wrestlers of the era appear as themselves, and Joan Rivers can be briefly seen as a teenage girl in the audience.

== Plot ==
Honest "Mister Universe" winner Tommy Tompkins is recruited by a dishonest wrestling promoter and wins a series of matches. Tommy is horrified when he is told to throw a match and proves that he is unable to do it because of his natural honesty.

== Cast ==
- Jack Carson as Jeff Clayton
- Janis Paige as Lorraine
- Vince Edwards as Tommy Tompkins
- Bert Lahr as Joe Pulaski
- Robert Alda as Fingers Maroni
- Maxie Rosenbloom as Big Ears
- Joyce Mathews as Maroni's Moll
- Harry Landers as Henchman
- Donald Novis as Singer
- Murray Rothenberg as Reporter
- Dennis James as Himself

== Reception ==
In a contemporary review for The New York Times, critic Howard Thompson called the film "a transparent, soft-pedaled little spoof" and wrote: "[T]he actors scamper around with offhand raucousness, and the restrictions of Searle Kramer's script and Mr. Lerner's own direction, while original, make the picture seem a lot breezier than it actually is. Whether intentional or not, however, it's the good-natured air of the cast that pulls the picture along."

Picturegoer wrote: "True, much of the fun springs from the mauling of stooges, but the humour is no less effective for being elementary, or rather primitive."

== Comic-book adaption ==
A comic-book adaptation of the film was published by Eastern Color in the December 1950 issue of the anthology comic book Movie Love.
