= Opened by Mistake =

- Directed by: George Archainbaud
- Written by: Kenneth Earl; Hal Hudson; Louis S. Kaye; Stuart Palmer; Garnett Weston
- Produced by: Stuart Walker
- Starring: Charlie Ruggles; Janice Logan; Robert Paige; William Frawley; Florence Shirley
- Cinematography: Theodor Sparkuhl
- Edited by: Arthur P. Schmidt
- Music by: John Leipold
- Distributed by: Paramount Pictures
- Release date: 1940
- Running time: 67 minutes
- Country: United States
- Language: English

Opened by Mistake is a 1940 film starring Charlie Ruggles and Janice Logan.

== Plot ==
Journalist buddies Jimmie Daniels and Buzz Nelson have decided to spend their vacation together at the Latonia horse race track on Yucatán, Mexico. Their plans are seemingly spoiled when their publisher Kingsley orders Jimmie, who is the newspaper's most prominent reporter, to do a story on missing banker Martin James, who stole one million dollars from his bank before disappearing.

Buzz comes up with an idea that Jimmie tells the publisher that intelligence places the banker in Yucatán. The publisher buys this argument and the two buddies leave for Mexico, with a thousand dollars in cash to cover the expenses. They quickly lose most of the money on the track, without even so much as lift their eyes to find the missing banker.

Somehow, Kingsley sniffs the scam the two men are pulling and orders Jimmie back to the office immediately. Kingsley plans to meet Jimmie at the boat and disclose the plot. But Jimmie finds out about the plan from Kingsley's secretary, Elizabeth Stiles, and tries to intercept Kingsley, flying home with Buzz and then sneaking onto the ship he was supposed to arrive on. Buzz buys a second-hand trunk in a riff-raff store to look like he has traveled on his own.

Jimmie's plan fails as Kingsley finds the two original tickets for Jimmie and Buzz, and Jimmie is fired right away. When the two men come home and open Buzz's trunk it turns out there is a dead woman's body in it. Soon after their discovery, a mysterious woman named Margaret Nicholls arrives and offers to buy the trunk from them. When the woman leaves, Jimmie follows her and later contemplates alerting the police, when he hears a radio broadcast announcing himself and a female accomplice as suspected murderers.

Jimmy acts with the belief that Margaret is innocent, and together they team up to try to find the real killer. Buzz tells them he bought the trunk at Sam Peter's warehouse. When they go there they find Sam Peter dead. They manage to flee the scene and get Peters' orderbook and get three names to check up on.

The first name turns out to be dead ends, but the second leads to the address of a pair of newly-weds. The brand new Mrs. De Borest becomes suspicious and opens up the trunk her husband has, finding out from the contents that he is a traveling salesman and not a count as he has led her to believe.

When Jimmie and Margaret arrive at the last address, they meet perfumer Jarvis Woodruff. He offers Margaret to try his latest creation, but sees a picture of Jimmie and Margaret in the paper and alerts the police. Jimmie and Margaret still manage to flee to a nearby diner. Margaret confesses that she is an insurance investigator on the lookout for the banker's stolen money. Using a handkerchief to wipe Jimmies face, she notices that it's not hers but the dead woman's and that it smells just like the perfume she tried at Woodruff's apartment.

Jimmie and Margaret both sneak back to Woodruff's apartment but are caught by him and locked into a refrigerator room. The police soon arrive and are also tricked into the refrigerator room.

Buzz has picked up Jimmie's trail and arrives at the building, lures his way in and then manage to release everyone locked into the refrigerator room. The police arrest Woodruff for the murder of his wife and Margaret find the million dollars in another trunk in the apartment. Jimmie gets an exclusive on the story to bring to his publisher. Since he has fallen in love with Margaret, they marry and go to Mexico on honeymoon. While they are there, Jimmie reads about the banker's capture in Central Park.

== Cast ==
- Charlie Ruggles as Buzz Nelson
- Janice Logan as Margaret Nichols
- Robert Paige as Jimmie Daniels
- William Frawley as Matt Kingsley
- Florence Shirley as Elizabeth Stiles
- Lawrence Grossmith as Jarvis Woodruff
- Rafael Corio as Mr. DeBorest
- Esther Dale as Mrs. DeBorest
- James Burke as Sergeant Wilkins
- Jack Norton as Al, bartender
- Byron Foulger as Roger Weatherby
- Cy Kendall as Oberweiser
