= Arthur P. Schmidt =

American film editor and producer

- Born: August 21, 1912
- Died: July 22, 1965 (aged 52); Los Angeles, California, U.S.
- Occupation: Film editor
- Years active: 1933–1965
- Spouse: Madeline Wilson (later Mrs. Groenewegen)
- Children: Arthur Schmidt

Arthur P. Schmidt (August 21, 1912 – July 22, 1965) was an American film editor and producer. He had more than sixty film credits for editing from 1934 through 1962. In the 1950s, Schmidt edited five films directed by Billy Wilder. In the 1960s, Schmidt was the associate producer for seven Jerry Lewis comedies.

== Biography ==
Schmidt's first editing credits are for films from RKO Pictures, which was one of the major Hollywood studios in the 1930s; his RKO credits include Anne of Green Gables (1934). By 1936 he was working at a second studio, Paramount Pictures, where he remained for twenty years. He worked on several of the Bulldog Drummond B-movies, The Blue Dahlia (1946) and When Worlds Collide (1951). He edited seven films directed by George Marshall, including three comedies starring Bob Hope (Monsieur Beaucaire (1946), Sorrowful Jones (1949), and Off Limits (1953)).

At Paramount, Schmit began his notable collaboration with the director Billy Wilder. With Doane Harrison, he edited Sunset Boulevard (1950), which was nominated for the Academy Award for Best Film Editing. Harrison had been the editor for all of Wilder's films since his first American film as a director, The Major and the Minor (1942); ultimately, the two worked together on films for nearly thirty years.

Schmidt edited Wilder's next film, Ace in the Hole (1951), with Harrison again being credited as "editorial supervisor". Roger Ebert recently commented on this film, "There's not a wasted shot in Wilder's film, which is single-mindedly economical. Students of Arthur Schmidt's editing could learn from the way every shot does its duty. There's not even a gratuitous reaction shot."

Schmidt's third film with Wilder was Sabrina (1954), which was Wilder's last film with Paramount. Harrison's credit had changed to "editorial advisor". By 1957 both Schmidt and Wilder were working independently of Paramount. He edited The Spirit of St. Louis (1957); by then, Harrison was being credited as a producer. Schmidt's editing of The Spirit of St. Louis still attracts critical attention long after the film's release; the film tells the story of Charles Lindbergh's historic, first aircraft crossing of the Atlantic Ocean in 1927.

In 2004, Richard Armstrong wrote, "Lindbergh's takeoff is spellbinding. Like the aircraft, the editing is superbly designed. Editor Arthur Schmidt juggles shots of the runway, the plane, Lindbergh's goggled concentration, the muddying undercarriage, Mahoney, the girl, back to the plane, ... for as long as it takes Lindbergh to clear the telegraph wires and trees. Notice that the shots of the pilot find him visibly connected to the controls. Man and machine have never been more at one. It is an alarming passage, suggesting just how many are being "carried" by that flimsy little aircraft." Gene D. Phillips wrote in 2010 that, "The takeoff in the rain from Roosevelt Field in Long Island is a virtuoso set piece" that is "superbly edited by Schmidt".

In the same year as Spirit of Saint Louis, Schmidt and Philip W. Anderson were nominated for the Academy Award for their editing of Sayonara (1957-directed by Joshua Logan). Schmidt also edited The Old Man and the Sea (1958-directed by John Sturges). Schmidt's fifth and final film with Wilder was Some Like It Hot (1959); Daniel Mandell edited Wilder's Witness for the Prosecution (1957), and subsequently edited Wilder's films through the 1960s.

The final phase of Schmidt's career was working on Jerry Lewis comedy films. He edited Cinderfella (1960) and It's Only Money (1962), which was his last editing credit. He was the associate producer for seven of Lewis' films, from The Errand Boy (1961) through The Family Jewels (1965). Schmidt died suddenly on July 22, 1965, in Los Angeles, California.

Schmidt's son Arthur R. Schmidt was also an Academy Award-winning film editor.

== Selected filmography ==
Editor
| Year | Film | Director | Notes |
|---|---|---|---|
| 1934 | Finishing School | George Nicholls Jr.; Wanda Tuchock | First collaboration with George Nicholls Jr. |
| 1934 | Anne of Green Gables | George Nicholls Jr. | Second collaboration with George Nicholls Jr. |
| 1935 | Chasing Yesterday | George Nicholls Jr. | Third collaboration with George Nicholls Jr. |
| 1935 | The Return of Peter Grimm | George Nicholls Jr. | Fourth collaboration with George Nicholls Jr. |
| 1935 | In Person | William A. Seiter | |
| 1936 | Chatterbox | George Nicholls Jr. | Fifth collaboration with George Nicholls Jr. |
| 1936 | Hideaway Girl | George Archainbaud | First collaboration with George Archainbaud |
| 1937 | Clarence | George Archainbaud | Second collaboration with George Archainbaud |
| 1937 | Hotel Haywire | George Archainbaud | Third collaboration with George Archainbaud |
| 1937 | Blonde Trouble | George Archainbaud | Fourth collaboration with George Archainbaud |
| 1937 | Bulldog Drummond's Revenge | Louis King | First collaboration with Louis King |
| 1938 | Dangerous to Know | Robert Florey | First collaboration with Robert Florey |
| 1938 | Touchdown, Army | Kurt Neumann | First collaboration with Kurt Neumann |
| 1939 | Disbarred | Robert Florey | Second collaboration with Robert Florey |
| 1939 | Bulldog Drummond's Secret Police | James P. Hogan | First collaboration with James P. Hogan |
| 1939 | Undercover Doctor | Louis King | Second collaboration with Louis King |
| 1939 | Million Dollar Legs | Nick Grinde | |
| 1939 | All Women Have Secrets | Kurt Neumann | Second collaboration with Kurt Neumann |
| 1940 | Seventeen | Louis King | Third collaboration with Louis King |
| 1940 | Opened by Mistake | George Archainbaud | Fifth collaboration with George Archainbaud |
| 1940 | Queen of the Mob | James P. Hogan | Second collaboration with James P. Hogan |
| 1940 | Texas Rangers Ride Again | James P. Hogan | Third collaboration with James P. Hogan |
| 1941 | Las Vegas Nights | Ralph Murphy | First collaboration with Ralph Murphy |
| 1941 | Aloma of the South Seas | Alfred Santell | |
| 1942 | Fly-by-Night | Robert Siodmak | |
| 1942 | Dr. Broadway | Anthony Mann | |
| 1942 | Priorities on Parade | Albert S. Rogell | |
| 1942 | Street of Chance | Jack Hively | |
| 1943 | Salute for Three | Ralph Murphy | Second collaboration with Ralph Murphy |
| 1943 | Henry Aldrich Gets Glamour | Hugh Bennett | |
| 1943 | The Good Fellows | Jo Graham | |
| 1944 | Rainbow Island | Ralph Murphy | Third collaboration with Ralph Murphy |
| 1945 | A Medal for Benny | Irving Pichel | |
| 1945 | Duffy's Tavern | Hal Walker | |
| 1946 | The Blue Dahlia | George Marshall | First collaboration with George Marshall |
| 1946 | Monsieur Beaucaire | George Marshall | Second collaboration with George Marshall |
| 1947 | The Perils of Pauline | George Marshall | Third collaboration with George Marshall |
| 1947 | I Walk Alone | Byron Haskin | |
| 1948 | Hazard | George Marshall | Fourth collaboration with George Marshall |
| 1949 | Sorrowful Jones | Sidney Lanfield | |
| 1949 | Top o' the Morning | David Miller | |
| 1950 | Sunset Boulevard | Billy Wilder | First collaboration with Billy Wilder |
| 1951 | The Redhead and the Cowboy | Leslie Fenton | |
| 1951 | Ace in the Hole | Billy Wilder | Second collaboration with Billy Wilder |
| 1951 | When Worlds Collide | Rudolph Maté | |
| 1952 | The Savage | George Marshall | Fifth collaboration with George Marshall |
| 1952 | Off Limits | George Marshall | Sixth collaboration with George Marshall |
| 1953 | The Stars Are Singing | Norman Taurog | |
| 1953 | Here Come the Girls | Claude Binyon | |
| 1954 | Red Garters | George Marshall | Seventh collaboration with George Marshall |
| 1954 | Sabrina | Billy Wilder | Third collaboration with Billy Wilder |
| 1955 | We're No Angels | Michael Curtiz | First collaboration with Michael Curtiz |
| 1956 | The Vagabond King | Michael Curtiz | Second collaboration with Michael Curtiz |
| 1957 | The Spirit of St. Louis | Billy Wilder | Fourth collaboration with Billy Wilder |
| 1957 | Sayonara | Joshua Logan | |
| 1958 | The Naked and the Dead | Raoul Walsh | |
| 1958 | The Old Man and the Sea | John Sturges | |
| 1959 | Some Like It Hot | Billy Wilder | Fifth collaboration with Billy Wilder |
| 1959 | Li'l Abner | Melvin Frank | |
| 1960 | Cinderfella | Frank Tashlin | First collaboration with Frank Tashlin |
| 1962 | It's Only Money | Frank Tashlin | Second collaboration with Frank Tashlin |

Editorial department
| Year | Film | Director | Role | Notes |
|---|---|---|---|---|
| 1933 | Midshipman Jack | Christy Cabanne | Assistant editor | Uncredited |
| 1964 | The Patsy | Jerry Lewis | Editorial supervisor | Fifth collaboration with Jerry Lewis |
| 1964 | The Disorderly Orderly | Frank Tashlin | Editorial supervisor | Fourth collaboration with Frank Tashlin |
| 1965 | The Family Jewels | Jerry Lewis | Editorial supervisor | Sixth collaboration with Jerry Lewis |

Additional crew
| Year | Film | Director | Role | Notes |
|---|---|---|---|---|
| 1960 | The Bellboy | Jerry Lewis | Assistant to producer | First collaboration with Jerry Lewis |
| 1961 | The Ladies Man | Jerry Lewis | Assistant to producer | Second collaboration with Jerry Lewis |

Producer
| Year | Film | Director | Credit | Notes |
|---|---|---|---|---|
| 1961 | The Errand Boy | Jerry Lewis | Associate producer | Third collaboration with Jerry Lewis |
| 1963 | The Nutty Professor | Jerry Lewis | Associate producer | Fourth collaboration with Jerry Lewis |
| 1963 | Who's Minding the Store? | Frank Tashlin | Associate producer | Third collaboration with Frank Tashlin |
| 1964 | The Patsy | Jerry Lewis | Associate producer | |
| 1964 | The Disorderly Orderly | Frank Tashlin | Associate producer | |
| 1965 | The Family Jewels | Jerry Lewis | Associate producer | |

Shorts

Editor
| Year | Film | Director |
|---|---|---|
| 1943 | Paramount Victory Short No. T2-4: The Aldrich Family Gets in the Scrap | Hugh Bennett |

Producer
| Year | Film | Director | Credit |
|---|---|---|---|
| 1963 | Scorpio Rising | Kenneth Anger | Co-producer |

TV series

Editor
| Year | Title | Notes |
|---|---|---|
| 1959 | Bonanza | 1 episode |
| 1962 | Mrs. G. Goes to College | 3 episodes |

== See also ==
- List of film director and editor collaborations
