= Slattery's Hurricane =

1949 film by André de Toth

- Theatrical release poster
- Directed by: Andre de Toth
- Screenplay by: Richard Murphy; Herman Wouk
- Story by: Herman Wouk
- Produced by: William Perlberg
- Starring: Richard Widmark; Linda Darnell; Veronica Lake; John Russell; Gary Merrill
- Narrated by: Gary Merrill
- Cinematography: Charles G. Clarke
- Edited by: Robert Simpson
- Music by: Cyril J. Mockridge
- Production company: 20th Century Fox
- Distributed by: 20th Century Fox
- Release date: August 9, 1949 (United States)
- Running time: 83 minutes
- Country: United States
- Language: English
- Box office: $1,650,000

Slattery's Hurricane is a 1949 American drama film directed by Andre de Toth and starring Richard Widmark, Linda Darnell and Veronica Lake. It is based on a story submitted by Herman Wouk, who also coauthored the screenplay and published a novel of the film in 1956.

== Plot ==
Disgruntled with the US Navy, in part because he was disciplined instead of decorated for a hazardous mission, Lt. Willard Francis "Will" Slattery (Richard Widmark) left the service to become a private pilot for candy manufacturer R. J. Milne (Walter Kingsford), on the recommendation of his girlfriend, Dolores Grieves (Veronica Lake), Milne's secretary.

Slattery lives an easy life, until the day he literally bumps into Lt. "Hobby" Hobson (John Russell), an old Navy buddy. Amused that Hobson stayed in the Navy, he nonetheless accepts an invitation to fly along on a weather flight into the heart of a hurricane. Slattery is disturbed to find that Hobby is married to his former lover, Aggie (Linda Darnell), who ended their unhappy relationship years before. When the two couples go for dinner, he pretends to have just met her, but Dolores immediately suspects their past attachment. Slattery invites Hobby to fly with him the next day, maneuvering Aggie into coming along, to show off his lifestyle, and introduces them to Milne and his shady partner, Mr. Gregory (Joe De Santis).

Slattery tricks Aggie into meeting him alone while Hobby is away, and although she initially rejects his "fast one", he seduces her. Dolores confronts Slattery and they argue over his betrayal of Hobby and the effect his job is having on him. He soon discovers Dolores has not only moved out, but quit her job as well, alarming Milne and Gregory, who fear she knows too much about their dealings. In the meantime, Slattery's affair with Aggie continues.

Milne has Slattery fly him to a remote Caribbean island, where Milne has a heart attack. Slattery tries to save his life on the flight back, and discovers that Milne is smuggling drugs, taped to his chest. Milne dies and Slattery keeps the "parcel". Dolores telephones him and warns him again to get out, but he gets drunk instead. Gregory beats him up to get back the "parcel", but Slattery counters with a warning that he has hidden information about the smuggling ring in a safe deposit box, should anything happen to him.

The Navy unexpectedly awards Slattery the Navy Cross for his wartime heroics. Dolores attends the ceremony but collapses when she sees Slattery embrace Aggie. Dolores is hospitalized in a psychiatric ward for "pharmacopsychosis," or drug addiction. Slattery is called in by her doctor and castigated for his role in her illness. He leaves his Navy Cross with Dolores and goes to Aggie's to end the relationship. A drunken Hobby is there, having discovered the affair. He beats an unresisting Will, but is ordered to report for a hurricane mission. Slattery sees that Hobby is in no condition to fly the mission and knocks him out to prevent it. He then steals his employer's plane and flies into the storm.

Slattery flies into the eye of the hurricane and reports its position. His warning is instrumental in saving Miami from serious loss of life and property, but in returning to Miami, he loses an engine. Believing he will crash, he also radios the tower about the location of the drug-smuggling information. When the aircraft does crash, he unexpectedly survives. Slattery is accepted back on active duty, and he and Delores reconcile.

== Cast ==
- Richard Widmark as Willard Francis "Will" Slattery
- Linda Darnell as Mrs. Aggie Hobson
- Veronica Lake as Dolores Grieves
- John Russell as Lieutenant F. J. "Hobby" Hobson
- Gary Merrill as Commander E. T. Kramer
- Walter Kingsford as R. J. Milne
- Raymond Greenleaf as Adm. William F. Ollenby
- Stanley Waxman as Frank
- Joe De Santis as Gregory
- Morris Ankrum as Dr. Holmes

== Production ==
Herman Wouk came upon the idea for Slattery's Hurricane while researching weather data for his future Pulitzer Prize-winning novel, The Caine Mutiny.

After publishing it as a short story in The American Magazine, he submitted the idea to Twentieth Century Fox, and was commissioned by Fox in January 1948 to write a concise plot and flesh out characters for a proposed screenplay.

Wouk, a budding novelist, instead rewrote the story as a book, for which Fox procured the film rights for $50,000. He was paid an additional $25,000 to co-write the screenplay with Richard Murphy. Fox writers A. I. Bezzerides, John Monks, Jr. and William Perlberg also had uncredited roles in drafting the screenplay, which was finished in September 1948. The novel itself was not published until 1956. Both Tyrone Power and Dana Andrews were originally considered for the role of Slattery before Widmark, in just his sixth role, was cast as the lead.

Dolores' characterization as a drug addict in the original story became a major issue between the studio and the Production Code Administration (PCA). The studio apparently ignored a memo from PCA head Joseph Breen sent in November 1948, which advised that it would be necessary to remove this characterization as it was in direct violation of the Production Code. Several weeks later, the PCA again complained that the revised final script still characterized Dolores as a drug addict, and noted "that there has now been introduced into this script a highly offensive sexuality and adulterous relationship between Slattery and Aggie." As a result, the adultery was diluted down to dialogue innuendo and actions suggestive of a sexual affair.

Breen warned Colonel Jason S. Joy, Director of Public Relations for Fox, that if the drug addiction were to be left in the finished picture, it would not be approved by the PCA. In April 1949, her hospitalization sequence was reshot, and the script rewritten so that the drug problem was replaced with an implied psychiatric condition. However, her fictional admission slip to a psychiatric ward is shown close-up to the audience and displays a diagnosis of "pharmacopsychosis", or psychosis resulting from drug use.

Filming of Slattery's Hurricane began "at the close of the hurricane season in 1948" at Master Field, Florida, part of the Naval Air Station Miami complex. The U.S. Navy weather reconnaissance squadron depicted in the film, VP-23, was deployed to Miami to support the production, with extensive footage shot of its PB4Y-2M Privateer aircraft. Squadron personnel were employed as extras, including nearly all members assembled in the decoration ceremony. At the close of filming, a projected move to NAS Patuxent River was cancelled and PatRon Twenty Three remained at Master Field until 1952. (Note: A private Grumman Mallard amphibian was also used in Slattery's Hurricane.)

In the preliminary print of Slattery's Hurricane pre-screened in mid-May 1949, Slattery was killed in the crash of the aircraft and died a hero. Veronica Lake, then married to the film's director, Andre de Toth, unsuccessfully used the film as a vehicle for her possible career comeback. In her autobiography Veronica, Lake wrote:

"The Navy, proud of Slattery's Hurricane and the salute it gave to Navy pilots, previewed the film in its 90-ton giant aircraft, the Constitution. Eighty-six people made that flight and circled around Manhattan for three hours, ate lunch and watched 'Slattery's Hurricane'. A temporary projection system had been installed as well as a silver screen in the front of the plane ... and some writers covering the flight speculated on what use in-flight films might have in commercial aviation. If they only knew."

== Reception ==
When first released, Thomas M. Pryor (known as T.M.P), film critic for The New York Times, gave Slattery's Hurricane a mostly positive review, writing, "His redemption up in the wild and not-so-blue yonder is a palpable hoax. However, Richard Widmark plays this conventional rogue with more intensity and professional acumen than the role deserves. But it is a good thing that Mr. Widmark was so willing and earnest because had his acting been less worthy Slattery's Hurricane would have tumbled like a stack of cards in the wind. Andre de Toth's direction is good in that it keeps the story moving and, curiously enough, the constant switching via flashbacks from the plane to detailed visualizations of Slattery's recollections is not as disturbing as might be expected."

According to Diabolique magazine in 2020 Lake "gives a poor performance – the sexy bombshell of Alan Ladd pictures looks like a bland wallflower doormat – she’s got no spunk or life, she’s a colorless nothing."

== Adaptation ==
A radio adaptation of Slattery's Hurricane starring Richard Conte, Maureen O'Hara and Lake was broadcast on Lux Radio Theatre in March 1950.
