= Hold That Blonde! =

1945 film by George Marshall

- Directed by: George Marshall
- Screenplay by: Walter DeLeon; Earl Baldwin; Eddie Moran
- Based on: The Heart of a Thief; 1914 play by Paul Armstrong
- Produced by: Paul Jones
- Starring: Eddie Bracken; Veronica Lake; Albert Dekker
- Cinematography: Daniel L. Fapp
- Edited by: Leroy Stone
- Music by: Werner R. Heymann
- Production company: Paramount Pictures
- Distributed by: Paramount Pictures
- Release date: November 23, 1945
- Running time: 76 minutes
- Country: United States
- Language: English

Hold That Blonde! is a 1945 American comedy crime film directed by George Marshall and starring Eddie Bracken, Veronica Lake and Albert Dekker.

== Plot ==
Bracken plays a kleptomaniac who unwittingly becomes involved with a gang of jewel thieves, including a beautiful woman, Sally, whom he promptly falls in love with, initially unaware of her true occupation.

== Cast ==
- Eddie Bracken as Ogden Spencer Trulow III
- Veronica Lake as Sally Martin
- Albert Dekker as Insp Callahan
- Frank Fenton as Mr. Phillips
- George Zucco as Dr. Paval Storasky
- Donald MacBride as Mr. Kratz
- Lewis Russell as Henry Carteret
- Norma Varden as Mrs. Carteret
- Willie Best as Willie
- Jack Norton as the drunk
- Lyle Latell as Tony

== Production ==
The film was originally known as Good Intentions.

Officially it is a remake of Paths to Paradise, a 1925 silent comedy starring Raymond Griffith, inasmuch as both are based on the same play, The Heart of a Thief by Paul Armstrong. However, the storyline was almost entirely reworked, to the extent that the two films have almost nothing in common apart from a few sight gags and a party sequence in which a valuable necklace is the target of the thieves.

The movie was originally offered to Bob Hope, then under contract to Paramount. He refused to do it unless he could make one film per year outside Paramount. The studio refused and Hope was put on suspension. The part was given instead to Eddie Bracken. (Hope and Paramount would eventually resolve their differences and sign a new seven-year contract.)

Filming started 20 November 1944. The part was a favorite of Lake's because it represented a change of pace for her ("it's a comedy, rather what Carole Lombard used to do") and she liked working with George Marshall, calling him "splendid... he's lots of fun, acts out the scenes himself," she said.

== Reception ==
Diabolique said "this is the sort of movie that should have been great fun but just isn’t; Bracken flails about, Lake is dull and lacking sexiness, and together they lack the chemistry of, say, Bob Hope and Paulette Goddard."
