= Janice Logan =

American actress

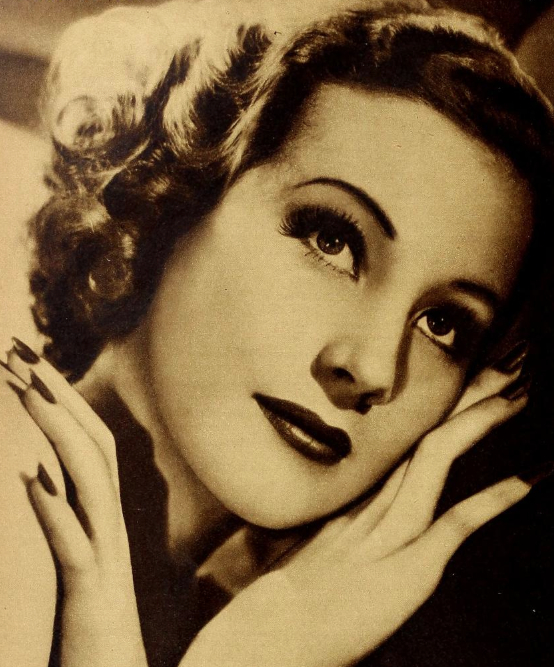
- Logan, 1940
- Born: Shirley Logan; May 30, 1915; Chicago, Illinois, U.S.
- Died: October 23, 1965 (aged 50); Glendale, California, U.S.
- Resting place: Forest Lawn Memorial Park
- Occupation: Actress
- Years active: 1939–1944
- Spouse: Jacques Schoeller

Janice Logan (May 30, 1915 – October 23, 1965) was an American film actress.

== Early years ==
Logan was a native of Chicago. Her father was Stuart Logan, "one of Chicago's leading investment brokers."

== Film ==
Logan's film debut came in Dr. Cyclops, in which she played Dr. Mary Robinson. She worked for Paramount in the late 1930s and during the 1940s. She also starred in Opened by Mistake (1940) with Charles Ruggles. She starred in Hotel de verano, directed by René Cardona in 1944. She was photographed by Leo Matiz in 1943 during the period of her career when she was filming Mexican movies.

== Personal life ==
Logan was married to French journalist Jacques Schoeller.

== Death ==
Shirley Logan Schoeller died in 1965. She is buried at Rosehill Cemetery and Mausoleum, Chicago, Cook County Illinois next to her mother Gladys.

== Filmography ==
Year	Title	Role	Notes
1939	Undercover Doctor	Margaret Hopkins	
1939	What a Life	Miss Shea	
1940	Dr. Cyclops	Dr. Mary Robinson	
1940	Opened by Mistake	Margaret Nichols	
1944	Summer Hotel		
1944	El as negro		(final film role)
