= Flesh Feast (film) =

1970 film by Brad F. Grinter

- Directed by: Brad F. Grinter
- Written by: Thomas Casey; Brad F. Grinter
- Produced by: Brad F. Grinter; V.L. Grinter; Veronica Lake
- Starring: Veronica Lake
- Cinematography: Thomas Casey
- Production company: Viking International Pictures
- Distributed by: Cineworld Pictures
- Release date: April 8, 1970
- Running time: 72 minutes
- Country: United States
- Language: English

Flesh Feast (released in 1970, though shot in 1967) is a 1970 American horror film that features Veronica Lake in her final screen performance.

== Plot ==
Dr. Elaine Frederick, a mad scientist, is working on developing maggots that prefer human flesh, while her services are used to make a clone of Adolf Hitler. She cooperates with the plan to resurrect Hitler as a way of exacting revenge for the death of her mother, a political prisoner executed in Ravensbrück concentration camp. While convincing everyone that the flesh-eating maggots are for regeneration research, she simply wants to throw them in the resurrected Hitler's face, which she does.

== Cast ==
- Veronica Lake - Dr. Elaine Frederick
- Phil Philbin - Ed Casey
- Heather Hughes - Kristine
- Martha Mischon - Virginia Day
- Yanka Mann - Miss Powell
- Dianne Wilhite - Nurse
- Chris Martell - Max Bauer
