= $1,000 a Touchdown =

1939 film by James P. Hogan

- Theatrical release poster
- Directed by: James P. Hogan
- Screenplay by: Delmer Daves
- Produced by: William C. Thomas
- Starring: Joe E. Brown; Martha Raye; Eric Blore; Susan Hayward; John Hartley; Joyce Mathews
- Cinematography: William C. Mellor
- Edited by: Chandler House
- Music by: Charles Bradshaw; John Leipold; Leo Shuken
- Production company: Paramount Pictures
- Distributed by: Paramount Pictures
- Release date: October 4, 1939
- Running time: 71 minutes
- Country: United States
- Language: English

$1,000 a Touchdown is a 1939 American comedy film directed by James P. Hogan, written by Delmer Daves, and starring Joe E. Brown, Martha Raye, Eric Blore, Susan Hayward, John Hartley and Joyce Mathews. It was released on October 4, 1939, by Paramount Pictures.

== Plot ==
Marlowe Mansfield Booth, the heir of an illustrious stage family, is a histrionic failure onstage because he loses his voice when faced with medium-to-large-sized audiences. While seeking a cure, he meets the love-starved Martha Madison, who runs a destitute drama school that she inherited from her relatives. Determined to keep the establishment from closing down and being converted into a shoe factory, Martha mortgages her house to pay her creditor, the stingy Mr. Fishbeck, and assisted by a group of stranded stage performers, she renovates the property before announcing that the school is ready for business. Marlowe is appointed president, and actress Betty McGlen is hired to teach a course in romance. When students fail to appear, Martha's ex-butler, Henry, suggests that the school needs a football team. By offering a course in romance, the school attracts numerous football players from various colleges, including Bill Anders, who is attracted to Betty. Aided only by a book on how to coach football, Marlowe manages to assemble a capable team, but decides against allowing substitute players due to his inability to face more than 11 people simultaneously. When all the legitimate schools decline to play against her team, Martha hires a professional team to put on an exhibition game and bets every cent on her team, hoping to win enough money to pay off the school's debts. Just as the professional players are winning the game easily, Martha cleverly bets Fishbeck $1,000 for every touchdown her team scores, and then proposes the same wager to the captain of the professional team, successfully turning the tide towards her team. However, Fishbeck cancels the wager after he begins losing, and Martha's bribe money dries up. The professional players then start scoring numerous touchdowns, and all seems lost when Bill suffers an injury on the field. Marlowe, however, accidentally ingests some alcohol and, thus fortified, enters the game. In a whirlwind finish, he wins the match and the prize money for his school.

== Cast ==
- Joe E. Brown as Marlowe Mansfield Booth
- Martha Raye as Martha Madison
- Eric Blore as Henry
- Susan Hayward as Betty McGlen
- John Hartley as Bill Anders
- Joyce Mathews as Lorelei
- George McKay as Mr. Fishbeck
- Syd Saylor as Bangs
- Tom Dugan as Popcorn vendor
- Matt McHugh as Brick Benson
- Don Wilson as Announcer
- Paula DeCardo as Dora (uncredited)
- Dot Farley as Hysterical Girl (uncredited)
- Bill Thompson as Animal and Bird Impersonator (uncredited)
- Adrian Morris as Two Ton Terry (uncredited)

== Reception ==
Frank Nugent of The New York Times criticized the film as unoriginal.

== See also ==
- List of American football films
