= Million Dollar Legs (1939 film) =

1939 film by Edward Dmytryk, Nick Grinde

- Directed by: Nick Grinde; Edward Dmytryk (uncredited)
- Written by: Richard English; Lewis R. Foster
- Produced by: William C. Thomas
- Starring: Betty Grable; Jackie Coogan
- Cinematography: Harry Fischbeck
- Edited by: Arthur P. Schmidt
- Music by: John Leipold
- Distributed by: Paramount Pictures
- Release date: July 14, 1939
- Running time: 65 minutes
- Country: United States
- Language: English

Million Dollar Legs is a 1939 American comedy film starring Betty Grable, Jackie Coogan, John Hartley and Donald O'Connor.

The film has no relation to the W. C. Fields movie from seven years earlier also entitled Million Dollar Legs.

== Plot synopsis ==
Freddie Frye, the charming student body president of Middleton College, is struggling to find ways to impress his ex-girlfriend Susie so that she will get back with him. The college is heavily controlled by its rich donors, who only allow traditional sports to be played. Despite this Freddie tries his best to start a rowing team at the college and gets into a conflict with the school administration for his rebellious ways. The team finally has to face down State University as a final test to their skills.

== Cast ==
- Betty Grable as Carol Parker
- John Hartley as Greg Melton Jr.
- Buster Crabbe as Coach Jordan (as Larry Crabbe)
- Donald O'Connor as Sticky Boone
- Jackie Coogan as Russ Simpson
- Dorothea Kent as Susie Quinn
- Joyce Mathews as Bunny Maxwell
- Peter Lind Hayes as Freddie 'Ten-Percent' Fry (as Peter Hayes)
- Richard Denning as Hunk Jordan
- Phil Warren as Buck Hogan
- Edward Arnold Jr. as Blimp Garrett
- Thurston Hall as Gregory Melton Sr.
- Roy Gordon as Dean Wixby
- Matty Kemp as Ed Riggs
- William Tracy as Egghead Jackson
- William Holden as Graduate Who Says 'Thank You' (uncredited)

== Production ==
Betty Grable and Jackie Coogan were married at the time and had appeared together the previous year playing supporting roles in the musical comedy College Swing starring George Burns, Gracie Allen, Martha Raye and Bob Hope. Not long after this film, Twentieth Century-Fox insured Grable's legs for $1 million.
