= Undercover Doctor =

1939 film by Louis King

- Theatrical release poster
- Directed by: Louis King
- Screenplay by: William R. Lipman; Horace McCoy
- Produced by: Edward T. Lowe Jr.
- Starring: Lloyd Nolan; Janice Logan; J. Carrol Naish; Heather Angel; Broderick Crawford; Robert Wilcox
- Cinematography: William C. Mellor
- Edited by: Arthur P. Schmidt
- Music by: John Leipold; Victor Young
- Production company: Paramount Pictures
- Distributed by: Paramount Pictures
- Release date: June 9, 1939
- Running time: 67 minutes
- Country: United States
- Language: English

Undercover Doctor is a 1939 American crime film directed by Louis King, written by William R. Lipman and Horace McCoy. The film stars Lloyd Nolan, Janice Logan, J. Carrol Naish, Heather Angel, Broderick Crawford and Robert Wilcox. It was released on June 9, 1939, by Paramount Pictures.

== Plot ==
Dr. Bartley Morgan appears to be a highly respectable doctor and runs a profitable private practice with his nurse Margaret Hopkins. Underneath his respectable veneer, he is engaged in a range of illegal activities. FBI agent Robert Anders investigates Morgan.

== Cast ==
- Lloyd Nolan as Robert Anders
- Janice Logan as Margaret Hopkins
- J. Carrol Naish as Dr. Bartley Morgan
- Heather Angel as Cynthia Weld
- Broderick Crawford as Eddie Krator
- Robert Wilcox as Tom Logan
- Richard Carle as Elmer Porter
- Stanley Price as Johnny Franklin
- John Eldredge as Gordon Kingsley
- George Meeker as Dapper Dan Barr
- Raymond Hatton as Dizzy Warner
- Phil Warren as Spats Edwards
- Paul Fix as Monk Jackson
- Richard Denning as Frank Oliver
- Paul E. Burns as Mack Belton
- Paul Stanton as Courtney Weld
- Clem Bevans as Sam Whitmore
- Charles Trowbridge as Lt. Watson
- Charles Williams as Pinky Valkus
