= The Blue Dahlia =

1946 American crime film by George Marshall

- Theatrical release poster
- Directed by: George Marshall
- Written by: Raymond Chandler
- Produced by: John Houseman
- Starring: Alan Ladd; Veronica Lake; William Bendix
- Cinematography: Lionel Lindon
- Edited by: Arthur P. Schmidt
- Music by: Victor Young
- Production company: Paramount Pictures
- Distributed by: Paramount Pictures
- Release date: April 19, 1946
- Running time: 100 minutes
- Country: United States
- Language: English
- Box office: $2,750,000 (US rentals); 1,063,165 admissions (France)

The Blue Dahlia is a 1946 American crime film and film noir with an original screenplay by Raymond Chandler directed by George Marshall and starring Alan Ladd, Veronica Lake and William Bendix. It was Chandler's first original screenplay.

== Plot ==
After the war, three demobilized United States Navy aviators, Johnny Morrison, Buzz Wanchek, and George Copeland, members of the same flight crew, arrive in Hollywood, California. Buzz has shell shock and a metal plate in his head above his ear. He is triggered by jazz, which he calls "monkey music".

While George and Buzz get an apartment together, Johnny surprises his wife, Helen, at her hotel bungalow, where she is hosting a riotous party. Johnny discovers that she is having an affair with Eddie Harwood, the owner of the Blue Dahlia nightclub on the Sunset Strip. Johnny punches Eddie as he leaves; the other guests depart. Helen, drunk, confesses to Johnny that their son, Dickie, whom she had told Johnny died of diphtheria, actually died in a car crash due to her drunk driving. Johnny and Helen scuffle, which is witnessed by the hotel detective, "Dad" Newell. Johnny pulls a gun on her, but drops it on a chair and leaves.

Buzz goes to find Johnny, but meets Helen in the hotel bar. They are unaware of each other's identity. They go to her bungalow for a drink. When Buzz discovers who she is, he leaves.

Helen telephones Eddie, who breaks up with her. However, she blackmails him into seeing her again. Eddie visits Helen at her bungalow.

Walking in the rain, Johnny is given a ride by Joyce Harwood, a complete stranger who is driving to Malibu. She is estranged from Eddie. Neither reveals their names. Although attracted to each other, they part ways. Johnny and Joyce happen to spend the night at the same beachside inn. They see each other at breakfast the next morning and decide to walk on the beach. While purchasing a bus ticket for Los Angeles, Johnny hears the radio announce that Helen has been murdered and that he is the prime suspect. He then quickly leaves to board a bus. Joyce also hears the announcement, sees Johnny's reaction and him disposing of his coat, arousing her suspicions.

Johnny checks into a cheap hotel in Los Angeles under an assumed name. Corelli, the hotel manager, discovers his identity, finds Johnny's framed photo of himself with Dickie, and tries to blackmail him. Johnny punches Corelli out, smashing the frame in the process; he discovers on the back of the photograph, a note Helen had written for insurance that reveals that Eddie is really a murderer wanted in New Jersey.

Corelli revives and sells information on Johnny's identity to a gangster named Leo, Eddie's nightclub partner, who then kidnaps Johnny. Johnny escapes, knocking Leo and his sidekick both out just before Eddie arrives. They talk, and Eddie admits with regret that, fifteen years earlier, he was involved in the shooting of a bank messenger. Leo comes around and tries to shoot Johnny, but during their scuffle, the gun discharges, killing Eddie. Johnny shoots Leo and flees to the Blue Dahlia, where the police are trying to force a confused Buzz to confess that he killed Helen.

Johnny enters and suggests that Joyce turn up the jazz music. As his head pounds, Buzz remembers leaving Helen alive in her bungalow. Newell tries to shift suspicion towards George, then attempts to leave as Police Captain Hendrickson accuses him of trying to blackmail Helen about her affair and killing her when she refused to comply. Newell tries to escape, but is shot dead by Hendrickson when he pulls his own gun.

Afterward, Buzz and George decide to go for a drink, leaving Johnny and Joyce together.

== Cast ==
- Alan Ladd as Johnny Morrison
- Veronica Lake as Joyce Harwood
- William Bendix as Buzz Wanchek
- Howard da Silva as Eddie Harwood
- Doris Dowling as Helen Morrison
- Hugh Beaumont as George Copeland
- Tom Powers as Captain Hendrickson
- Howard Freeman as Corelli
- Don Costello as Leo
- Will Wright as "Dad" Newell
- Frank Faylen as man recommending motel
- Walter Sande as Heath

Uncredited performances include Mae Busch as Jenny the maid, Anthony Caruso as a corporal playing a jukebox, and Noel Neill as Nolie the hatcheck girl.

== Production ==
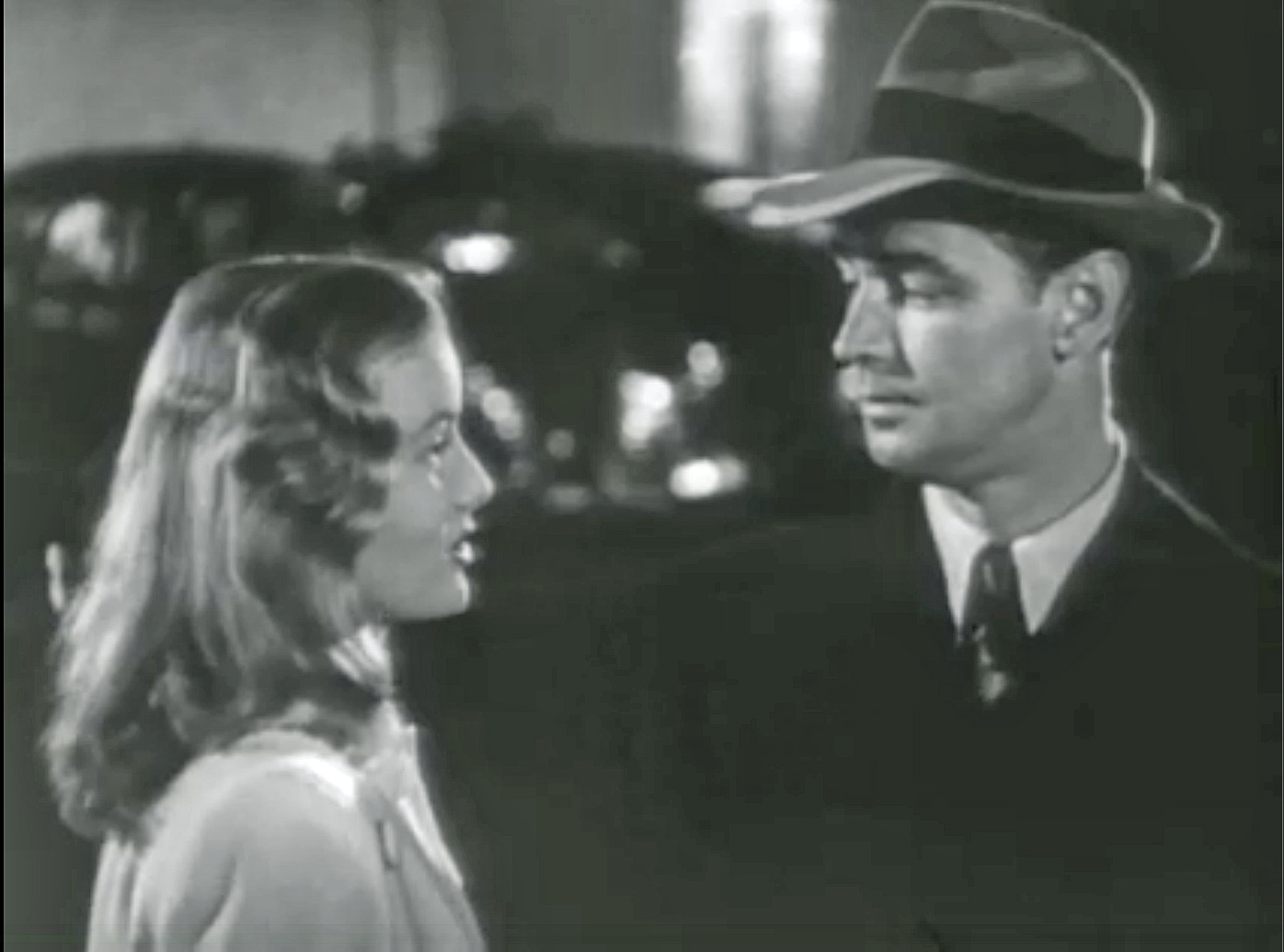
Veronica Lake and Alan Ladd in the trailer for The Blue Dahlia (1946)

=== Development ===
In 1945 Alan Ladd was one of Paramount's top stars. He had served for ten months in the army in 1943 before being honorably discharged due to illness; however, he had recently been reclassified 1-A for the military draft, and he might have had to go back into the Army. Paramount kept applying for deferments so he could make films but Ladd was due for induction in May 1945.

The studio wanted to make a movie starring him before that happened, but had nothing suitable. Producer John Houseman knew Raymond Chandler from having collaborated on Paramount's The Unseen, which Houseman produced and Chandler rewrote. Houseman says Chandler had started a novel but was "stuck" and was considering turning it into a screenplay for the movies instead. Houseman read the 120 pages Chandler had written and, within 48 hours, it was sold to Paramount. Houseman would produce it under the supervision of Joseph Sistrom.

It was the first original script for the screen that Chandler had ever written. He wrote the first half of the script in under six weeks and sent it to Paramount. Delighted, the studio arranged for filming to start in three weeks' time.

Paramount announced the film in February 1945, with Ladd, Lake, Bendix and Marshall (the director) all attached from the beginning. Houseman said George Marshall had a reputation for rewriting extensively on the set and had to persuade him to stick to the script. (Marshall said he was so impressed with the writing he never had any intention of rewriting.)

Houseman recalled that Ladd was unhappy with the casting of Doris Dowling as his wife because she was half a foot taller than he but this was disguised during their scenes together.

=== Shooting ===
Shooting began in March 1945 without a completed screenplay. Houseman was not worried initially because of his confidence in Chandler. He says four weeks into filming the studio began to worry as they were running out of script. "We had shot sixty-two pages in four weeks; Chandler, during that time, had turned in only twenty-two—with another thirty to go."

The problem was the ending. Originally, Chandler intended the killer to be Buzz having a blackout. However, the Navy did not want a serviceman to be portrayed as a murderer, and Paramount told Chandler that he had to come up with a new ending. Chandler responded at first with writer's block. Paramount offered Chandler a $5,000 incentive to finish the script, which did not work, according to Houseman:

It was the front-office calculation, I suppose, that by dangling this fresh carrot before Chandler's nose they were executing a brilliant and cunning maneuver. They did not know their man. They succeeded, instead, in disturbing him in three distinct and separate ways: One, his faith in himself was destroyed. By never letting Ray share my apprehensions, I had convinced him of my confidence in his ability to finish the script on time. This sense of security was now hopelessly shattered. Two, he had been insulted. To Ray, the bonus was nothing but a bribe. To be offered a large additional sum of money for the completion of an assignment for which he had already contracted and which he had every intention of fulfilling was by his standards a degradation and a dishonor. Three, by going to him behind my back they had invited him to betray a friend and fellow Public School man. The way the interview had been conducted ('sneakily') filled Ray with humiliation and rage.

Chandler wanted to quit, but Houseman convinced him to sleep on it. The next day, Chandler said he would be able to finish the film if he resumed drinking. Houseman said that the writer's requirements were "two Cadillac limousines, to stand day and night outside the house with drivers available", "six secretaries", and "a direct line open at all times to my office by day, to the studio switchboard at night and to my home at all times." Houseman agreed and says Chandler then started drinking:

[Chandler] did not minimize the hazards [of drinking]", said Houseman in 1964, "He pointed out that his plan... would call for deep faith on my part and supreme courage on his, since he would in effect be completing the script at the risk of his life. (It wasn't the drinking that was dangerous, he explained, since he had a doctor who gave him such massive injections of glucose that he could last for weeks with no solid food at all. It was the sobering up that was parlous; the terrible strain of his return to normal living)."

At the end of that time, Chandler presented the finished script.

Chandler was unhappy with the forced ending, saying it made "a routine whodunnit out of a fairly original idea." He also disliked the performance of Lake. "The only times she's good is when she keeps her mouth shut and looks mysterious", he told a friend. "The moment she tries to behave as if she had a brain she falls flat on her face. The scenes we had to cut out because she loused them up! And there are three godawful close shots of her looking perturbed that make me want to throw my lunch over the fence."

Chandler received a lot of deference on the set, but Lake was not familiar with him so, upon asking about him and being told, "He's the greatest mystery writer around", she made a point of listening intently to an analysis of his work by the film's publicity director to impress newspaper reporters with her knowledge of a writer she had never read. Chandler developed an intense dislike for Lake and referred to her as "Moronica Lake".

Lake later said about her role, "I'm not much of a motivating force, but the part is good."

By May 1945, the government ruled that all men aged 30 or over would be released from the obligation to go back into the Army. Ladd did not have to re-enlist after all.

== Reception and legacy ==
=== Box office ===
The Blue Dahlia ranked among the most popular films at the British box office in 1946.

=== Critical response ===
In a contemporary review for The New York Times, critic Bosley Crowther called the film "a honey of a rough-'em-up romance" and wrote: "[A]n air of deepening mystery overhangs this tempestuous tale which shall render it none the less intriguing to those lovers of the brutal and bizarre. ... George Marshall has tautly directed from Mr. Chandler's crafty script. The tact of all this may be severely questioned, but it does make a brisk, exciting show."

Variety magazine wrote: "Playing a discharged naval flier returning home from the Pacific first to find his wife unfaithful, then to find her murdered and himself in hiding as the suspect, Alan Ladd does a bangup job. Performance has a warm appeal, while in his relentless track down of the real criminal, Ladd has a cold, steel-like quality that is potent. Fight scenes are stark and brutal, and tremendously effective."

James Agee, critic and author writing in 1946, called the film "convincing and entertaining in a dry, nervous, electric way ... I hope there will be more films of the quality of The Blue Dahlia ... The picture is as neatly stylized and synchronized, and as uninterested in moral excitement, as a good ballet; it knows its own weight and size perfectly and carries them gracefully and without self-importance; it is ... about as good a movie as can be expected from the big factories. In its own uninsistent way, for that matter, it does carry a certain amount of social criticism. For it crawls with American types; and their mannerisms and affectations, and their chief preoccupations—blackmail and what's-in-it-for-me—all seem to me to reflect, however coolly, things that are deeply characteristic of this civilization."

Diabolique called it "a fantastic film noir, full of atmosphere, intrigue, crackling dialogue and sensational performances, which was recognized as a classic almost immediately and made a tonne of money."

The film's title has been speculated to be the origin of the Black Dahlia nickname, given to 1947 murder victim Elizabeth Short.

On the review aggregator website Rotten Tomatoes, 100% of 12 critics' reviews are positive.

=== Awards and honors ===
Chandler was nominated for the Academy Award for Best Original Screenplay.

== Adaptations ==
The Blue Dahlia was dramatized as a half-hour radio play on the April 21, 1949 broadcast of The Screen Guild Theater, starring Lake and Ladd in their original film roles. The movie was also adapted into a stage play in 1989.

Houseman's narrative of the film's creation was dramatized for BBC Radio by Ray Connolly in 2009.
