= All Women Have Secrets =

1939 film by Kurt Neumann

- Theatrical release poster
- Directed by: Kurt Neumann
- Written by: Agnes Christine Johnston
- Story by: Dale Eunson
- Produced by: Edward T. Lowe, Jr.
- Starring: Virginia Dale; Joseph Allen; Jeanne Cagney; Peter Lind Hayes; Betty Moran; John Arledge
- Cinematography: Theodor Sparkuhl
- Edited by: Arthur P. Schmidt
- Music by: Charles Bradshaw; Victor Young; John Leipold
- Production company: Paramount Pictures
- Distributed by: Paramount Pictures
- Release date: December 15, 1939
- Running time: 85 minutes
- Country: United States
- Language: English

All Women Have Secrets is a 1939 American comedy film directed by Kurt Neumann and written by Agnes Christine Johnston. The film stars Virginia Dale, Joseph Allen, Jeanne Cagney, Peter Lind Hayes, Betty Moran and John Arledge. Also appearing briefly in one of her first screen roles is Veronica Lake, billed as Constance Keane.

The film was released on December 15, 1939, by Paramount Pictures.

== Plot ==
Three young couples, all having financial struggles, decide to risk getting married. Joe Tucker and new wife Susie begin their new life living in a trailer. Slats Warwick is in a continuous quarrel with bride Jennifer, whose allowance from her parents is keeping them afloat.

The couple having the hardest time is John and Kay Gregory, a pre-med student whose studies barely give him time to juggle part-time jobs and a singer who finds work in a nightclub, but hasn't yet broken the news to her husband that she's expecting a baby.

== Cast ==
- Virginia Dale as Jennifer Warwick
- Joseph Allen as John Gregory
- Jeanne Cagney as Kay Parker Gregory
- Peter Lind Hayes as Slats Warwick
- Betty Moran as Susie Blair
- John Arledge as Joe Tucker
- Janet Waldo as Doris
- Lawrence Grossmith as Professor Hewitt
- Una O'Connor as Mary
- Kitty Kelly as Flo
- Joyce Mathews as Peggy
- Audrey Maynard as Jill
- Wanda McKay as Jessie
- Margaret Roach as Betty
- Veronica Lake as Jane
- Fay McKenzie as Martha
- Barbara Denny as Alice
- Gwen Kenyon as Helen
- Marge Champion as Marion
- Lorraine Miller as Marie
- Fay Cotton as Connie
- Mildred Shay as Chloe
- Lorraine Krueger as Molly
- Phyllis Adair as Sybil
- Dick Elliott as Justice of the Peace
- Billy Lee as Bobby
- George Meeker as Doc
- Lambert Rogers as Dick
