= Disbarred (film) =

1939 film by Robert Florey

- Theatrical release poster
- Directed by: Robert Florey
- Screenplay by: Lillie Hayward; Robert R. Presnell
- Story by: Harry Sauber
- Produced by: Stuart Walker
- Starring: Gail Patrick; Robert Preston; Otto Kruger; Sidney Toler
- Cinematography: Harry Fischbeck
- Edited by: Arthur P. Schmidt
- Music by: Gerard Carbonara; John Leipold (uncredited)
- Production company: Paramount Pictures
- Distributed by: Paramount Pictures
- Release date: January 6, 1939
- Running time: 59 minutes
- Country: United States
- Language: English

Disbarred is a 1939 American crime film about a crooked lawyer starring Gail Patrick and Robert Preston. The supporting cast includes Otto Kruger, Virginia Vale and Sidney Toler. The movie was directed by film noir specialist Robert Florey.

== Plot ==
Tyler Craden is disbarred by the legal profession after destroying evidence against his client, gangster Mardeen, following the murder of a cop.

While on vacation, Craden ends up in a town in which a murder trial is taking place. He is impressed by defense attorney Joan Carroll and gets her a job with a firm run by Roberts, a corrupt pal.

Bradley Kent, an honest prosecutor, is a rival and a suitor to Joan. She rejects marriage proposals from Kent and Craden but joins the district attorney's office to fight crime. Mardeen turns up and tries to blackmail Craden, who shoots him. The district attorney arrests Craden and Roberts, which frees Joan to continue her work and to marry Kent.

== Cast ==
- Gail Patrick as Joan Carroll
- Robert Preston as Bradley Kent
- Otto Kruger as Tyler Craden
- Sidney Toler as G.L. 'Mardy' Mardeen
- Helen MacKellar as Abbey Tennant
- Virginia Dabney as Miss Gita LaRue
- Clay Clement as Attorney Roberts
- Frank M. Thomas as D.A. Blanchard
- John Hart as Reporter
- Virginia Vale as Stewardess (as "Dorothy Howe")
- Paul Fix as Stone
