= Bowery Boys =

Bowery Boys may refer to:

- Bowery Boys (gang), a 19th-century New York gang
- The Bowery Boys, a comedy team headlined by Huntz Hall and Leo Gorcey

== See also ==
- Bowery Boy (film), 1940
