= Doctor Rhythm =

1938 film by Frank Tuttle

- Theatrical release poster
- Directed by: Frank Tuttle
- Written by: Richard Connell; Jo Swerling
- Based on: The Badge of Policeman O'Roon by O. Henry
- Produced by: Emanuel Cohen
- Starring: Bing Crosby; Mary Carlisle; Beatrice Lillie; Andy Devine
- Cinematography: Floyd Crosby; Charles Lang
- Edited by: Alex Troffey
- Music by: James V. Monaco
- Production company: Major Pictures Corporation
- Distributed by: Paramount Pictures
- Release date: May 6, 1938 (USA)
- Running time: 80 minutes
- Country: United States
- Language: English
- Budget: $1.15 million

Doctor Rhythm is a 1938 American musical comedy film directed by Frank Tuttle and starring Bing Crosby, Mary Carlisle, Beatrice Lillie, and Andy Devine. Based on the 1907 short story The Badge of Policeman O'Roon by O. Henry, the film is about a doctor who pretends to be a policeman assigned as the bodyguard of a wealthy matron, whose beautiful niece becomes the object of his affections. The film features the songs "On the Sentimental Side" and "My Heart Is Taking Lessons".

== Plot ==
Dr. Bill Remsen (Bing Crosby) helps cover for his ailing policeman friend (Andy Devine) and takes the policeman's latest assignment as the bodyguard for a quirky but wealthy matron Mrs. Lorelei Dodge-Blodgett (Bea Lillie). Soon Bill falls in love with the lady's beautiful niece (Mary Carlisle). When the older woman becomes the target of thieves, Bill is able to thwart their efforts.

== Cast ==
- Bing Crosby as Dr. Bill Remsen
- Mary Carlisle as Judy Marlowe
- Beatrice Lillie as Mrs. Lorelei Dodge-Blodgett
- Andy Devine as Officer Lawrence O'Roon
- Rufe Davis as Al, the zookeeper
- Laura Hope Crews as Mrs. Minerva Twombling
- Fred Keating as Chris LeRoy
- John Hamilton as Insp. Bryce
- Sterling Holloway as Luke, the ice cream man
- Henry Wadsworth as Otis Eaton, the drunk
- Franklin Pangborn as Mr. Stenchfield, the store clerk
- Harold Minjir as Mr. Coldwater
- William Austin as Mr. Martingale, the floorwalker
- Gino Corrado as Cazzatta
- Harry Stubbs as Police captain
- Frank Elliott as Lorelei's butler
- Charles R. Moore as Tooter, the Chauffeur
- Emory Parnell as Sgt. Olson
- Louis Armstrong was cast as "Trumpet player" but his part was cut from the film.

== Production ==
The movie was filmed in Hollywood starting on October 13, 1937, and finishing in December of the same year. It had its Los Angeles premiere at the Paramount on April 28, 1938, and its New York premiere at the Paramount on May 18, 1938. This was Crosby's second independent feature outside his Paramount contract. George Stoll was the musical director with John Scott Trotter handling the musical arrangements and orchestration.

== Reception ==
Frank S. Nugent writing in The New York Times was not impressed. "In the Paramount’s Doctor Rhythm, Bing Crosby, Bea Lillie & Co. are wooing the comic muse as though they had a $5 bet on its surrender. Maybe a $3 bet. Nothing quite so grim as their pursuing of the elfin guffaw has been seen in these parts since Martha Raye fell down the incinerator chute....An advantage — we might say the only advantage — is the complete informality of the show, an attitude for which Miss Lillie is largely and blessedly responsible....This puts her one up on Mr. Crosby, whose crooning is almost too liquid this time. “On the Sentimental Side”, “This Is My Night to Dream” and “My Heart Is Taking Lessons” were not so much sung as wrung out. Too bad, too, for they're good numbers."

Variety liked it though. "...There is good marquee display in the title and top names, and customers will spread favorable comment after leaving theatres. This film should do nice business...‘On the Sentimental Side,’ one of five songs by John Burke and James V. Monaco, looms the likeliest along with ‘My Heart Is Taking Lessons.’ Frank Tuttle, who directed Waikiki Wedding with Crosby starred, seems to have the right combination on the crooner's films...Dr. Rhythm will keep Crosby at his present high box-office rating."

== Soundtrack ==
- "This Is My Night to Dream" (James V. Monaco, Johnny Burke by Bing Crosby
- "On the Sentimental Side" (James V. Monaco, Johnny Burke) by Bing Crosby
- "My Heart is Taking Lessons" (James V. Monaco, Johnny Burke) by Bing Crosby
- "There's Rhythm in This Heart of Mine" (Rodgers and Hart) by Beatrice Lillie
- "Only a Gipsy Knows" (James V. Monaco, Johnny Burke) by Beatrice Lillie, Bing Crosby and chorus
- "Public School 43" by Bing Crosby, Sterling Holloway, Andy Devine and Rufe Davis.

Bing Crosby recorded several of the songs for Decca Records. "On the Sentimental Side" reached the No. 4 spot in the charts of the day and spent 10 weeks in the lists. Crosby's songs were also included in the Bing's Hollywood series.
