= Louise Campbell (actress) =

American actress (1911–1997)

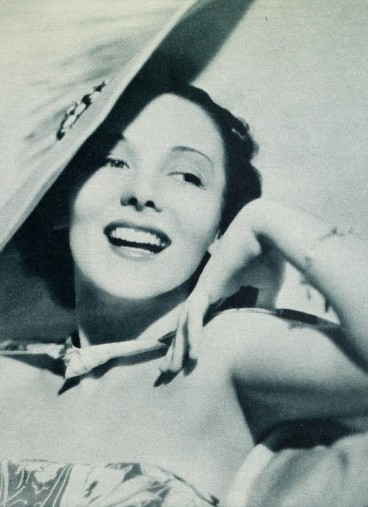
- Campbell in 1938
- Born: Louise Campbell Weisbecker; May 30, 1911; Chicago, Illinois, U.S.
- Died: November 5, 1997 (aged 86); Norwalk, Connecticut, U.S.
- Resting place: Saint Mary's Cemetery, Norwalk, Connecticut, U.S.
- Education: DePaul University
- Occupation: Actress
- Years active: 1930s–1980s
- Spouse: Horace McMahon (m. 1937; died 1971)
- Children: 3
- Parent(s): Joseph Weisbecker; Martha Langer

Louise Campbell Weisbecker (May 30, 1911 – November 5, 1997) was an American actress. Despite her success in Hollywood, she made it clear she preferred the stage.

Campbell was a leading lady in the late 1930s films, notably Bulldog Drummond Comes Back (1937) and The Star Maker (1939).

== Early years ==
Campbell was born Louise Weisbecker in Chicago, Illinois. She had a sister named Ottilia.

Campbell attended St. Michael's School, Northwestern University and DePaul University, studying dramatic arts at the latter. She gained additional dramatic training at the Chicago School of Expression. She said that when she was six years old, she decided to be an actress after she watched a production of Uncle Tom's Cabin.

At one point, she worked as a dental assistant, an experience which she said was "invaluable to me in my acting" as she observed changes in patients' facial expressions in the dentist's office, with their changing expressions displaying "their real character."

== Stage ==
Campbell gained early theatrical experience by performing in stock theater. Her Broadway debut was in Three Men on a Horse (1935). Her other Broadway credits include Julie the Great, Guest in the House (1941), A House in the Country (1936) and White Man (1936). A column in the June 13, 1942, issue of Billboard complimented "Louise Campbell, that fine actress, for a lovely, beautifully projected, altogether excellent performance in Guest in the House."

== Film ==
Campbell went to Hollywood in 1937 and made 13 films in the 1930s and 1940s. Her film debut was in Bulldog Drummond Comes Back (1937). Her film credits included Bulldog Drummond sequels, Night Club Scandal (1937), Men with Wings (1938), The Buccaneer (1938) with Fredric March, and The Star Maker (1939).

== Personal life ==
Campbell was married to actor Horace McMahon, whom she met when they were both in the Broadway play Three Men on a Horse. They wed in 1938 and remained married until his death in 1971.

== Death ==
Campbell died November 5, 1997, in Norwalk Hospital in Norwalk, Connecticut. She is buried at St. Mary's Cemetery in Norwalk, Connecticut.

== Filmography ==
Year	Title	Role	Notes
1937	Wild Money	Judy McGowan	
1937	Bulldog Drummond Comes Back	Phyllis Clavering	
1937	Night Club Scandal	Vera Marsh	
1937	Bulldog Drummond's Revenge	Phyllis Clavering	
1938	The Buccaneer	Marie de Remy	
1938	Scandal Street	Nora Langdon	
1938	Bulldog Drummond's Peril	Phyllis Clavering	
1938	Men with Wings	Peggy Ranson	
1939	Bulldog Drummond's Secret Police	Woman in Drummond's Dream	Uncredited, (archival footage)
1939	The Star Maker	Mary	
1940	Emergency Squad	Betty Bryant	
1940	Anne of Windy Poplars	Catherine Pringle	
1940	Bowery Boy	Anne Cleary	
1947	Bush Pilot		
1947	Devil Ship	Madge Harris	(final film role)
