= Rovin' Tumbleweeds =

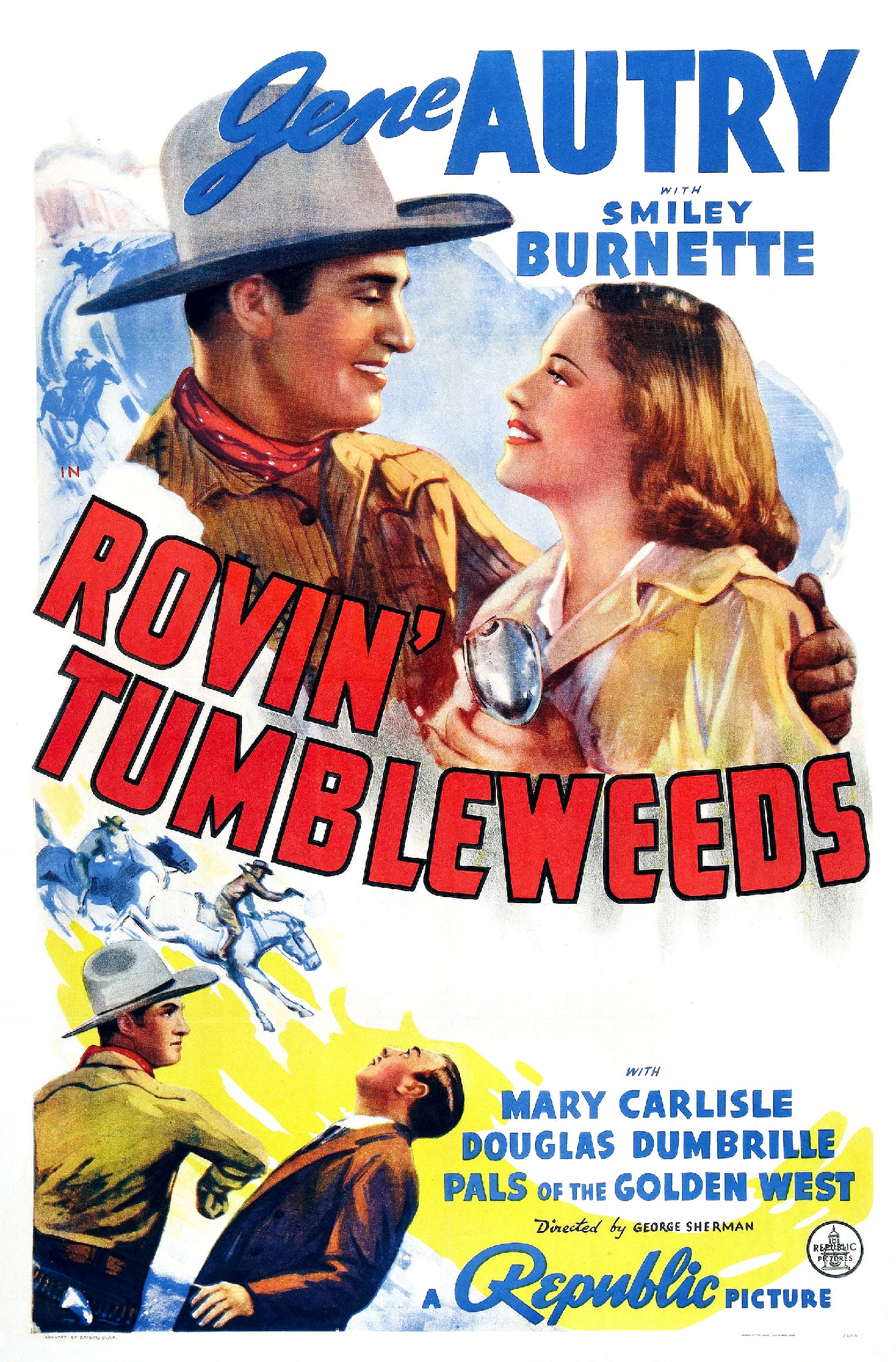
- Theatrical release poster
- Directed by: George Sherman
- Written by: Betty Burbridge; Dorrell McGowan; Stuart E. McGowan
- Produced by: William Berke (associate producer)
- Starring: Gene Autry; Smiley Burnette; Mary Carlisle
- Cinematography: William Nobles
- Edited by: Tony Martinelli
- Music by: Raoul Kraushaar (supervisor)
- Production company: Republic Pictures
- Distributed by: Republic Pictures
- Release date: November 16, 1939 (U.S.)
- Running time: 64 minutes
- Country: United States
- Language: English

Rovin' Tumbleweeds is a 1939 American Western film directed by George Sherman and starring Gene Autry, Smiley Burnette and Mary Carlisle. Written by Betty Burbridge, Dorrell McGowan, and Stuart E. McGowan, the film is about a cowboy congressman who exposes a crooked politician who is delaying passage of a flood control bill.

== Plot ==
Following a disastrous flood of the Green River, the ranchers of the valley are forced to abandon their land and migrate to neighboring Rand County. They are met with hostility by the citizens of Randville, who feel threatened by the influx of the dispossessed. The Green River ranchers find a friend in Gene Autry (Gene Autry), a cowboy who accepts a job singing on the local radio station in order to finance relief efforts.

Unknown to Gene and the migrant ranchers, Stephen Holloway (Douglass Dumbrille), the owner of the Rand Development Company, is conspiring with Congressman Fuller (Gordon Hart) to block a flood control bill in Congress until he can drive the ranchers out and buy up their land. When the citizens of Randville become disenchanted with Fuller, Holloway persuades an unwitting Gene to run for Congress on a flood control platform. After being elected, Gene goes to Washington, accompanied by his sidekick Frog Millhouse (Smiley Burnette) and Mary Ford (Mary Carlisle), the radio station reporter who quit her job to become Gene's secretary.

Six months later, tensions increase between the migrant ranchers and the citizens of Randville. In Washington, Gene finds it difficult to accomplish anything, stymied by the red tape of Congressional procedures and the secret efforts of Holloway's lobbyist. After his efforts to pass a flood control bill are defeated, Gene returns to Randville in the midst of another torrential downpour. The valley narrowly avoids disaster when Gene rallies the migrants to fight the raging river. Holloway finally realizes the importance of flood control and agrees to support Gene's bill.

== Cast ==
- Gene Autry as Gene Autry
- Smiley Burnette as Frog Millhouse
- Mary Carlisle as Mary Ford
- Douglass Dumbrille as Stephen Holloway
- Pals of the Golden West as Singers and Musicians
- William Farnum as Senator Timothy Nolan
- Lee "Lasses" White as Storekeeper
- Ralph Peters as Satchel
- Gordon Hart as Congressman Fuller
- Victor Potel as Man in Store
- Jack Ingram as Blockade Boss
- Sammy McKim as Eddie
- Reginald Barlow as Higgins, a migrant
- Eddie Kane as Congressman
- Guy Usher as Mr. Craig, Mary's Boss
- Slim Whitaker as Migrant (uncredited)
- Dan White as Townsman (uncredited)
- Champion as Gene's Horse (uncredited)

== Production ==
=== Stuntwork ===
Stuntwork on the film was performed by Joe Yrigoyen (Gene's double), Jack Kirk (Smiley's double), and David Sharpe.

=== Filming locations ===
Rovin' Tumbleweeds was filmed on location in Burro Flats in Simi Hills, California, Corriganville, and the Chatsworth Railroad Station.

=== Soundtrack ===
- "Away Out Yonder" (Fred Rose) by Gene Autry and Cowhands (during the opening credits and reprised at the end)
- "Ole Peaceful River" (Johnny Marvin) by Gene Autry and Cowhands
- "On the Sunny Side of the Cell" by Smiley Burnette and Cowhands in jail
- "Paradise in the Moonlight" (Gene Autry, Fred Rose) by Gene Autry and Cowhands
- "Back in the Saddle Again" (Ray Whitley) by Gene Autry and Pals of the Golden West
- "Rocky Mountain Express" (Harry Tobias, Charles Tobias, Albert von Tilzer) by Smiley Burnette and Pals of the Golden West, with Nora Lou Martin as soloist
- "Hurray" by Smiley Burnette
- "A Girl Like You and a Night Like This" (Gene Autry, Johnny Marvin) by Gene Autry

== Memorable lines ==
- Mary Ford: Congressman Fuller isn't going to run for re-election.

Gene Autry: Well, that won't break my heart.
Frog Millhouse: Who's going to run in his place?
Mary Ford: Gene!
Gene Autry: Say, did you land on your head?
Mary Ford: The evidence points to the other extremity.

- Gene Autry: I'm no politician.

Mary Ford: You were no radio singer, either, until I shoved a microphone in front of you.

- Hutton: I'm working for the boys who know how to take care of me.

Gene Autry: Well, here's my way of taking care of boys like you. [Gene slugs him]

- Gene Autry: Folks, if you're as tired of listenin' to your favorite commentator as I am, you'll be glad to know this is her last broadcast. From now on, she'll do her broadcastin' from the kitchen, 'cause I'm going to marry her.
