= Night Club Scandal =

1937 film by Ralph Murphy

- Theatrical release poster
- Directed by: Ralph Murphy
- Screenplay by: Lillie Hayward
- Produced by: William LeBaron
- Starring: John Barrymore; Lynne Overman; Louise Campbell; Charles Bickford; Harvey Stephens; J. Carrol Naish; Evelyn Brent
- Cinematography: Leo Tover
- Edited by: Archie Marshek
- Production company: Paramount Pictures
- Distributed by: Paramount Pictures
- Release date: November 11, 1937 (New York)
- Running time: 70 minutes
- Country: United States
- Language: English

Night Club Scandal is a 1937 American thriller film directed by Ralph Murphy and written by Lillie Hayward, based on a play by Daniel Nathan Rubin. The film stars John Barrymore, Lynne Overman, Louise Campbell, Charles Bickford, Harvey Stephens, J. Carrol Naish and Evelyn Brent. It was released on November 11, 1937, by Paramount Pictures.

== Plot ==
After murdering his unfaithful wife in his apartment, Dr. Ernest Tindal leaves before his wife's lover Frank discovers the body. Frank panics and flees, leaving his fingerprints. He is arrested, convicted and condemned to die.

A newspaper reporter, Kirk, and a police captain, McKinley, continue to investigate. Kirk becomes attracted to Vera, the suspect's sister. They successfully prove that Frank was falsely accused while Tindal conspires with gangsters Jack and Julia Reed, hoping to escape implication in the crime. Tindal shoots Jack but is taken into custody by McKinley.

== Cast ==
- John Barrymore as Dr. Ernest Tindal
- Lynne Overman as Russell Kirk
- Louise Campbell as Vera Marlin
- Charles Bickford as Det. Capt. McKinley
- Harvey Stephens as Frank Marlin
- J. Carrol Naish as Jack Reed
- Evelyn Brent as Julia Reed
- Elizabeth Patterson as Mrs. Elvira Ward
- Cecil Cunningham as Mrs. Alvin
- Barlowe Borland as Dr. Sully
- John Sheehan as Duffy
- George Guhl as Broun
- Frank O'Connor as Alcott
- Leonard Willey as Dr. Goodman
- George Offerman Jr. as Messenger Boy
- Virginia Vale as Marsh's Maid
- Robert Brister as District Attorney
- Richard Cramer as Prison Guard
- John Hamilton as Governor

== Reception ==
In a contemporary review for The New York Times, critic Bosley Crowther called Night Club Scandal a "workmanlike and reasonably exciting melodrama" and wrote:

The screen's finest Westphalian is still being purveyed by John Barrymore ... The role is merely a quoditian chore for John, but he brings it to a Barrymore-ish dignity, authority and presence which add immeasurably to its dramatic effectiveness. Though not especially "ambitious" in a productional sense, the film itself—largely in consequence—may be counted among the more tolerable of recent corpse operas.
