= News Gal =

- Starring: Betty Furness; Barry Kelley; Mark Stevens
- Country of origin: United States

Production
- Running time: 30 minutes

Original release
- Network: DuMont (1951); ABC (1957)
- Release: 1951 – 1957

News Gal is a TV series produced by the DuMont Television Network, and shown on both DuMont and ABC.

== Broadcast history ==
News Gal was produced by DuMont in 1951, and shown on ABC as Your Kaiser Dealer Presents Kaiser-Frazer "Adventures In Mystery" Starring Betty Furness In "Byline" from November 4 to December 9, 1951, and again in syndication in the fall of 1957.

The show starred Betty Furness, Barry Kelley, and Mark Stevens. It was reportedly shown on DuMont on Saturdays at 12 noon ET for two weeks in October 1951 under the title News Gal.

== Episode series ==
As with most DuMont series, no episodes are known to exist.

== See also ==
- List of programs broadcast by the DuMont Television Network
- List of surviving DuMont Television Network broadcasts

== Bibliography ==
- David Weinstein, The Forgotten Network: DuMont and the Birth of American Television (Philadelphia: Temple University Press, 2004) ISBN 1-59213-245-6
- Alex McNeil, Total Television, Fourth edition (New York: Penguin Books, 1980) ISBN 0-14-024916-8
- Tim Brooks and Earle Marsh, The Complete Directory to Prime Time Network and Cable TV Shows 1946–Present, Ninth edition (New York: Ballantine Books, 2007) ISBN 978-0-345-49773-4
