= Mary Carlisle =

American actress (1914–2018)

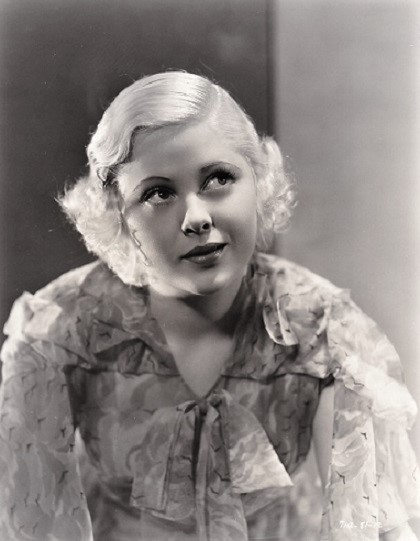
- Carlisle in 1933
- Born: Gwendolyn Witter; February 3, 1914; Boston, Massachusetts, U.S.
- Died: August 1, 2018 (aged 104); Los Angeles, California, U.S.
- Resting place: Westwood Village Memorial Park Cemetery
- Occupations: Actress, singer, dancer
- Years active: 1923–1943
- Spouse: James Blakeley (m. 1942; died 2007)
- Children: 1
- Relatives: Leotta Whytock (aunt)

Mary Carlisle (born Gwendolyn Witter; February 3, 1914 – August 1, 2018) was an American actress, singer and dancer, best known for her roles as a wholesome ingénue in numerous 1930s musical-comedy films.

Carlisle starred in more than 60 Hollywood films, moving beyond bit parts after coming to attention, alongside the likes of Gloria Stuart and Ginger Rogers, as one of 15 girls selected by the Western Association of Motion pictures as their WAMPAS Baby Stars in 1932. Her first major role was in the 1933 film College Humor with Bing Crosby. The two performers worked together in two additional films, Double or Nothing (1937) and Doctor Rhythm (1938). After her marriage in 1942 and a starring role in Dead Men Walk (1943), she retired from acting.

== Early life ==
Carlisle was born Gwendolyn Witter in Boston, Massachusetts on February 3, 1914, to Arthur William and Leona Ella (Wotton) Witter. Born into a religious family, she was educated in a convent in Back Bay, Boston, after her family moved to that neighborhood when she was six months old.

Some time after her father's death, when she was 4, Carlisle and her mother relocated to Los Angeles. Through her uncle Robert Carlisle, who was a film editor and producer, she learned of a casting call at Metro-Goldwyn-Mayer.

== Hollywood career ==
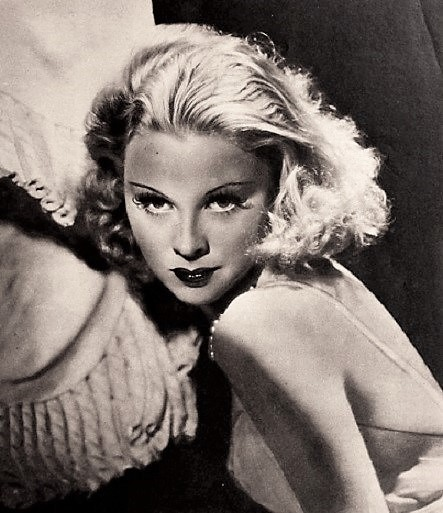

Carlisle's uncle, who lived in California, gave Carlisle the opportunity to appear in the Jackie Coogan silent movie Long Live the King in 1923, a performance for which she was uncredited. Carlisle was discovered by studio executive Carl Laemmle Jr. at the age of 14 while she was eating lunch with her mother at the Universal Studios canteen. She was praised for her angelic looks, and Laemmle offered her a screen test. Though she passed the test and started doing extra work at Universal, she was stopped by a welfare officer who noticed that she was underage and had to finish school first.

After completing her education two years later, she headed to MGM. Carlisle, who had lied about her dancing ability, took a one-day basic tap-dancing lesson, won a part along with future star Ann Dvorak, and appeared briefly in one film. Carlisle signed a one-year contract with MGM in 1930, and was used as a back-up dancer. At the start of her movie career, Carlisle had small parts in movies such as Madam Satan and Passion Flower (both 1930). She also had a role in Grand Hotel (1932), as a bride named Mrs. Hoffman. She gained recognition when, in 1932, she was selected as one of the WAMPAS Baby Stars (young actresses believed to be on their way to stardom).

Her major acting break came when Paramount Pictures "loaned" her out to star in the musical comedy College Humor (1933) alongside Bing Crosby. (In the Hollywood "star system", stars could not work for companies other than the one to which they were contracted.) The performance was well regarded by critics, and catapulted Carlisle to leading-actress status. She made two more movies with Crosby, Double or Nothing in 1937, and Doctor Rhythm (1938). She continued working for different studios, mainly in B-movies as a leading lady. One of Carlisle's few appearances in an A-movie was in Dance, Girl, Dance (1940), opposite Lucille Ball and Maureen O'Hara.

She acted in more than 60 movies in a career that spanned about a dozen years, and retired after co-starring as the doctor's wife in Dead Men Walk (1943).

== Personal life ==
In 1942, Carlisle married British-born actor James Edward Blakeley, who later became an executive producer at 20th Century Fox. She retired from films shortly after. The couple had one son, James, and two grandchildren during their nearly 65-year marriage. In later life, Carlisle was the manager of the Elizabeth Arden Salon in Beverly Hills, California.

After the death of Barbara Kent at age 103 in 2011, Carlisle became the last surviving WAMPAS Baby Star. She died on August 1, 2018, at the Motion Picture & Television Fund, a retirement community for actors in Woodland Hills, Los Angeles; no cause of death was reported. She was believed to be 104, but never personally confirmed her age or birth date during her life. Carlisle is buried in Westwood Memorial Park in Los Angeles, California.

Her mother's twin sister, Leotta Whytock, was a film editor.

== Accolades ==
On February 8, 1960, Carlisle received a star on the Hollywood Walk of Fame, at 6679 Hollywood Boulevard.

== Filmography ==
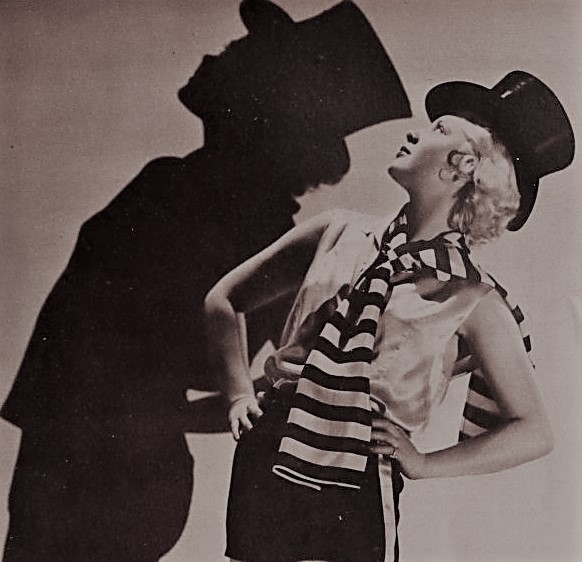
Mary Carlisle, motion silhouette

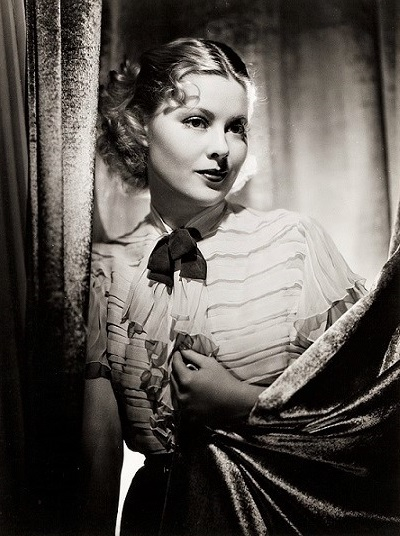
Carlisle in 1936 MGM publicity shot

Year	Title	Role	Source
1923	Long Live the King	Bit part (uncredited)	
1930	Children of Pleasure	Secretary (uncredited)	
1930	Madam Satan	Little Bo Peep (uncredited)	
1930	Passion Flower	Blonde party guest (uncredited)	
1931	The Great Lover	Blonde autograph-seeker (uncredited)	
1932	This Reckless Age	Cassandra Phelps	
1932	Hotel Continental	Alicia	
1932	Grand Hotel	Mrs. Hoffman (uncredited)	
1932	Night Court	Elizabeth Osgood	
1932	Down to Earth	Jackie Harper	
1932	Smilin' Through	Young party guest (uncredited)	
1932	Her Mad Night	Constance 'Connie' Kennedy	
1933	Men Must Fight	Evelyn	
1933	College Humor	Barbara Shirrel	
1933	East of Fifth Avenue	Edna Howard	
1933	Ladies Must Love	Sally Lou Cateret	
1933	Saturday's Millions	Thelma Springer	
1933	The Sweetheart of Sigma Chi	Vivian	
1933	Should Ladies Behave	Leone Merrick	
1934	Palooka	Anne Howe	
1934	This Side of Heaven	Peggy Turner	
1934	That's Gratitude	Dora Maxwell	
1934	Once to Every Woman	Doris Andros	
1934	Murder in the Private Car	Ruth	
1934	Handy Andy	Janice Yates	
1934	Kentucky Kernels	Gloria	
1934	Girl o' My Dreams	Gwen	
1935	Grand Old Girl	Gerry Killaine	
1935	The Great Hotel Murder	Olive Temple	
1935	Super Speed	Nan Gale	
1935	One Frightened Night	Doris Waverly	
1935	Champagne for Breakfast	Edie Reach	
1935	The Old Homestead	Nancy Abbott	
1935	It's in the Air	Grace Gridley	
Kind Lady	Phyllis		
1936	Love in Exile	Emily Stewart	
1936	Lady Be Careful	Billie 'Stonewall' Jackson	
1937	Hotel Haywire	Phyllis	
1937	Double or Nothing	Vicki Clark	
1937	That Navy Spirit	Judy Hollan	
1938	Tip-Off Girls	Marjorie Rogers	
1938	Doctor Rhythm	Judy Marlowe	
1938	Hunted Men	Jane Harris	
1938	Touchdown, Army	Toni Denby	
1938	Illegal Traffic	Carol Butler	
1938	Say It in French	Phyllis Carrington	
1939	Fighting Thoroughbreds	Marian	
1939	Inside Information	Crystal	
1939	Call a Messenger	Marge Hogan	
1939	Beware Spooks!	Betty Lou Winters	
1939	Rovin' Tumbleweeds	Mary Ford	
1940	Dance, Girl, Dance	Sally	
1941	Rags to Riches	Carol Patrick	
1942	Torpedo Boat	Jane Townsend	
1942	Baby Face Morgan	Virginia Clark	
1943	Dead Men Walk	Gayle Clayton	
