= The Cheat (1931 film) =

1931 film

- Directed by: George Abbott
- Written by: Harry Hervey; Hector Turnbull
- Starring: Tallulah Bankhead; Harvey Stephens; Irving Pichel
- Cinematography: George J. Folsey
- Edited by: Emma Hill
- Distributed by: Paramount Pictures
- Release date: November 28, 1931
- Running time: 74 minutes
- Country: United States
- Language: English

The Cheat is a 1931 American pre-Code drama film directed by George Abbott and starring Tallulah Bankhead and Harvey Stephens. The film is a remake of the 1915 silent film of the same title, directed by Cecil B. DeMille.

== Plot ==
Elsa Carlyle, in contrast to her charming personality and loving relationship with her indulgent husband, Jeffrey, is a compulsive gambler and spendthrift who is overly concerned with social standing and appearances.

Jeffrey tries to convince Elsa to avoid spending while he makes investments in an effort to provide them with enough wealth to live comfortably for the rest of their lives, but she had impulsively placed a large bet and immediately is $10,000 in debt. Later, after helping raise money for a charitable cause, she steals this money and invests it in a stock scheme, and promptly loses it as well when the stock tanks. Hardy Livingston, a wealthy ladies' man, has his eye on Elsa and finds his chance to trap her into an adulterous affair by giving her the money she needs to repay the charity money.

The next day Jeffrey informs her his investments have paid off and they are now fabulously wealthy. She attempts to repay the money she had borrowed from Livingston, however he wants sexual favors instead. Elsa says she would rather commit suicide; Livingston hands her a pistol and invites her to do so and when she does not, he brands her on the left side of her chest and she responds by taking the pistol and shooting him.

A suspicious Jeffrey has followed her and takes the blame for the shooting. As Jeffrey is on trial, Livingstone claims Jeffrey had tried to cheat him out of a debt and then shot him. To protect Elsa, Jeffrey refuses to deny this, and so Elsa stops the trial by shouting out the truth and showing the court the brand Livingstone had placed on her. The judge drops the charges against Jeffrey, Elsa promises again to stop gambling and the film ends.

== Cast ==
- Tallulah Bankhead as Elsa Carlyle
- Harvey Stephens as Jeffrey Carlyle
- Irving Pichel as Hardy Livingstone
- Jay Fassett as Terrell
- Ann Andrews as Mrs. Albright
- William Ingersoll as Croupier
- Hanaki Yoshiwara as Japanese Servant
- Willard Dashiell as Judge
- Edward Keane as Defense Attorney
- Robert Strange as District Attorney
- Ruth Donnelly as Woman in Court Behind Elsa (uncredited)
- Jimmy Granato as Orchestra Musician (uncredited)
- Porter Hall as Leslie (uncredited)
- Arthur Hohl as Defense Attorney (uncredited)
- Millard Mitchell as Courtroom Spectator (uncredited)
- Henry Warwick as Butler (uncredited)

== Production ==
The film was the last of three Bankhead vehicles made at Paramount's New York studio, now the Kaufman Astoria Studios.

== Release ==
The film was released in November, 1931. Because of this late released, reviews and screenings in many parts of the United States didn't occur until well into 1932.

The Cheat is available on DVD and Blu-ray. It was included in the Universal Backlot Series "Pre-Code Hollywood Collection" DVD box set released on April 7, 2009. It was released on blu-ray by Kino Lorber on October 26, 2021.

== Critical Assessment ==
The Cheat received mixed-to-negative reviews upon general release. Rollin Palmer of The Buffalo News said the film was not a suitable enough vehicle for Bankhead's obvious talent, although it "gives ample opportunity to study Miss Bankhead and appreciate those qualities which some day will make her one of the outstanding stars of the screen." Harry M. Cochran also praised the performances of Bankhead and Pichel but said "the picture somehow fails to measure up, probably because the story is just a step beyond the realms of reasonable possibility." International Photographer lamented that Pichel's role was so "repellant" that his "unusual talents are here employed to his own personal disadvantage."

Martin Dickstein, in his column "The Cinema Circuit" for The Brooklyn Daily Eagle said that "Bankhead, sadly treated in her first two talking pictures ... is more than ever unfortunate in her assignment to such an undistinguished vehicle as The Cheat," saying the film gave her "no opportunities for the fine acting of which she is surely capable." Dickstein went on to call it "one of the season's worst" films, noting the audience's reaction: "Laughs and applause in the wrong places were a bad sign." The Pittsburgh Press echoed many reviewers when it called the film "preposterous" and "quite old fashioned," but said Pichel was "quite effective as the sinister lad who's been spending his time somewhere east of Suez," while "Bankhead does all she can" and "may some day do something suitable to the powers very likely within her."

21st century reviewers have called The Cheat "a curiosity" and "high-toned trash," chiefly of value to viewers interested in seeing Bankhead's early work in talking pictures. The reviewer for Pre-Code.com criticizes the racism and slow pacing of the film but allows that "it will at least inspire interesting conversations with your loved one afterward." Matt Brewster of Cinema Sentries writes that The Cheat proves "classic movies aren't always classics."
