= It's in the Air (1935 film) =

1935 film by Charles Reisner

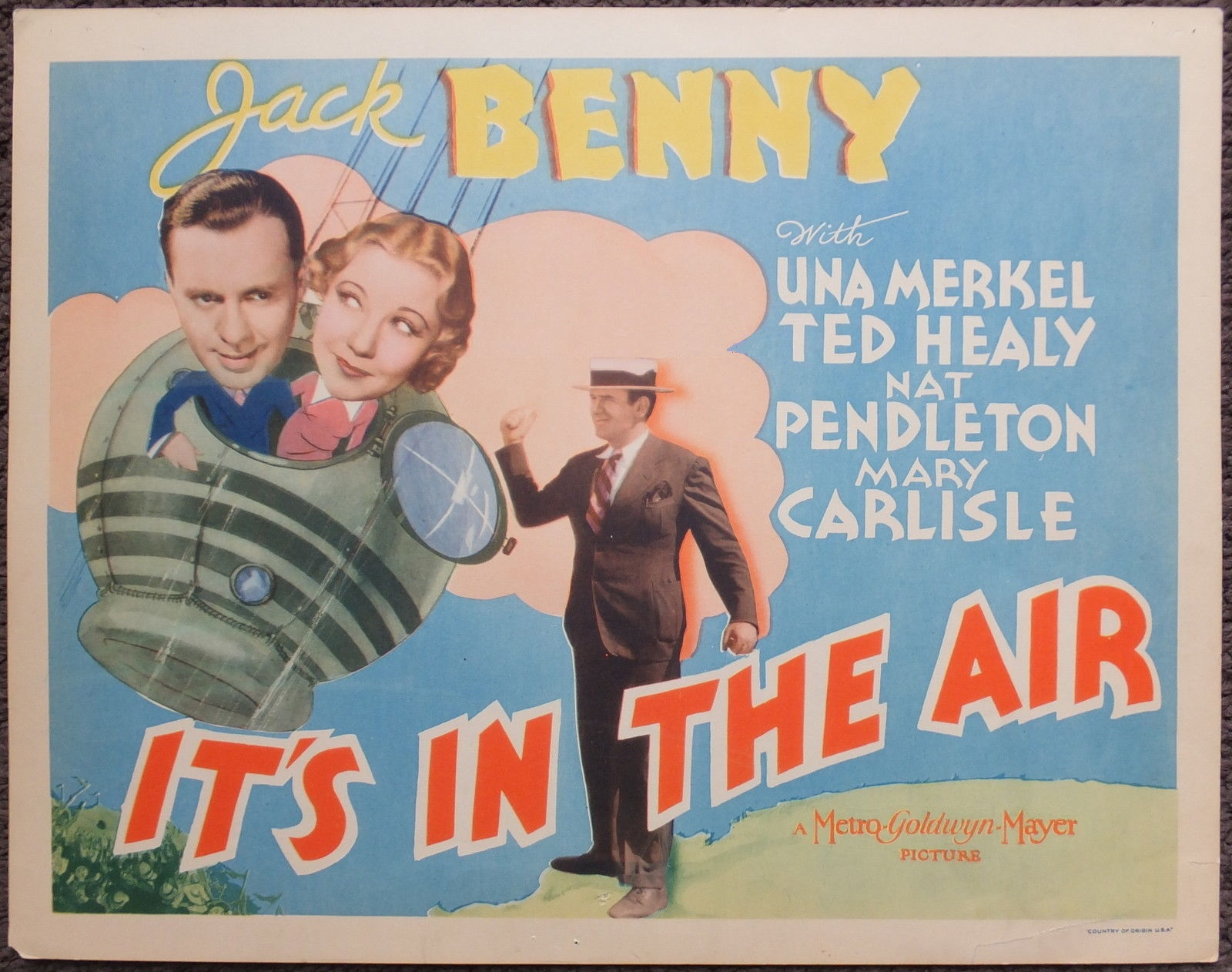
- Lobby card
- Directed by: Charles Reisner
- Screenplay by: Byron Morgan; Lew Lipton
- Story by: Byron Morgan; Lew Lipton
- Produced by: E.J. Mannix
- Starring: Jack Benny; Ted Healy; Una Merkel; Nat Pendleton; Mary Carlisle; Grant Mitchell
- Cinematography: Charles Edgar Schoenbaum
- Edited by: William S. Gray
- Music by: William Axt
- Production company: Metro-Goldwyn-Mayer
- Distributed by: Loew's Inc. (Metro-Goldwyn-Mayer)
- Release date: October 11, 1935
- Running time: 80 minutes
- Country: United States
- Language: English

It's in the Air (aka Chiseling Chiselers, In the Bag and Let Freedom Ring) is a 1935 American comedy film directed by Charles Reisner and written by Byron Morgan and Lew Lipton. The film stars Jack Benny in his final film for MGM, Ted Healy, Una Merkel, Nat Pendleton, Mary Carlisle and Grant Mitchell. It's in the Air was released on October 11, 1935, by Metro-Goldwyn-Mayer.

== Plot ==
Con men Calvin Churchill (Jack Benny) and "Clip" McGurk (Ted Healy), in the business of fixing races, boxing matches and other sporting events, are forced to go on the run when Henry Potke (Nat Pendleton), special investigator from the Revenue Department, is after them for tax evasion. Potke tracks the con men to a hotel room, where they trick him by claiming they are suffering from a highly infectious influenza. Potke flees in terror.

In a hurry to skip town, Calvin tells Clip to go to Desert Springs, California, to see his wife Alice (Una Merkel), who is a tennis instructor at a resort. Calvin meets W. R. Gridley (Grant Mitchell), a devious schemer who uses his lovely daughter Grace (Mary Carlisle) to convince Calvin to buy an air balloon. Calvin thinks that Gridley is the sucker, however, and negotiates a free aircraft ride to find the perfect location for a stratospheric flight in his new balloon. Calvin introduces Clip as one of the most daring balloonists in America. Clip, however, is afraid of heights.

Alice tells Calvin that she will not return to him until he quits his devious schemes but no sooner does he comply, than she witnesses him fleecing some hotel guests to pay for his room. When Calvin's photo appears in a newspaper, Potke heads off to the resort.

After leaving $85,000 in cash with Alice, Calvin tries to find Clip, who is in hiding, afraid to be forced to fly in the balloon. At the launch; the two hucksters finally arrive, and soar off into space. They make radio contact at a record 73,900 feet and after they broadcast their promoters' advertisements, Calvin and Clip find themselves in trouble when the balloon falls apart.

Forced to parachute to safety, Calvin tells reporters about his desire to be reunited with his wife. Potke arrives to announce that the charges for delinquent tax payments have been dropped, and Calvin and Alice reunite for good.

== Cast ==
- Jack Benny as Calvin Churchill
- Ted Healy as "Clip" McGurk
- Una Merkel as Alice Lane Churchill
- Nat Pendleton as Henry Potke
- Mary Carlisle as Grace Gridley
- Grant Mitchell as W. R. Gridley
- Harvey Stephens as Sidney Kendall
- Charles Trowbridge as Alfred Drake
- Johnny Arthur as Jones
- Al Shean as Mr. Johnson
- Purnell Pratt as Horace McNab
- Phillips Smalley as Mr. Winterby
- Howard Hickman as Mr. Ruby
- Larry Wheat as Tubbs
- Richard Kipling as Mr. Platt
- Jim Toney as Curly
- Maude Allen as Mrs. Smith Burlington
- George Chandler as Reporter (uncredited)

== Production ==
Principal photography on It's in the Air took place from mid-July to August 17, 1935. The film, followed Lost in the Stratosphere (1935) as one of the few 1930s aviation films that focused on high altitude balloons. (Note: The proposed Benny-Healy comedy team featured in It’s in the Air was the only pairing of the comedians as Benny went back to radio shortly after.)

== Reception ==
Frank Nugent, writing for The New York Times, called It's in the Air, an "... engaging a bit of nonsense", He further described, "Metro's new comedy team proves its superiority over the material placed at its disposal. The dialogue may read like a radio continuity, and most of the situations admittedly are as old as the "Cheating Cheaters" theme, but you probably won't be aware of that when Mr. Benny and Mr. Healy surge into action. When they take off in their balloon with the Revenue Bureau's Nat Pendleton as a supercargo and with Stratosphere Healy clutching a bottle of smelling salts—even a professional scowler is apt to find himself chuckling as heartily as the benighted little man who always used to read the subtitles aloud. If Metro regarded this Benny-Healy union as an experiment, let it be informed now that it was a success."

Aviation film historian James H. Farmer in Celluloid Wings: The Impact of Movies on Aviation (1984) considered It’s in the Air, (simply) "A hilarious comedy."
