= Lynne Overman =

American actor (1887–1943)

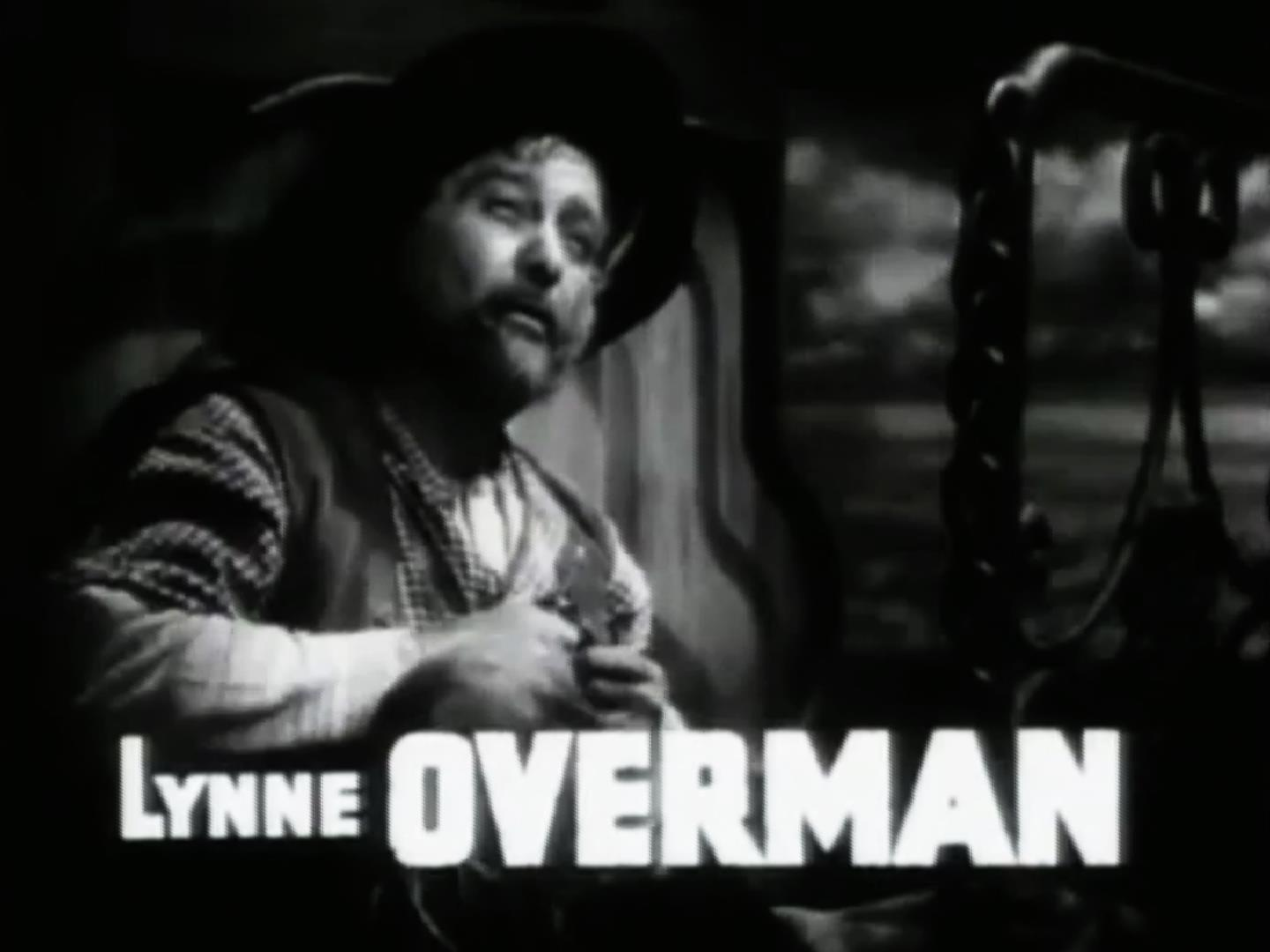
- Trailer for Union Pacific (1939)
- Born: September 19, 1887; Maryville, Missouri, U.S.
- Died: February 19, 1943 (aged 55); Santa Monica, California, U. S.
- Occupation: Film actor
- Years active: 1928–1943
- Spouse(s): Emily Helen Drange (m. 1932)

Lynne Overman (September 19, 1887 – February 19, 1943) was an American actor. In films he often played a sidekick.

== Early life and career ==
Overman was born in Maryville, Missouri. He began his career in theatre before becoming a film actor in the 1930s and early 1940s.

Early in his career, he sang in musical comedies, but he left that genre after a severe cold and an operation on his throat affected his larynx. His credits on Broadway included The Budget (1932), Hot-Cha! (1932), Company's Coming (1931), Dancing Partner (1930), Button, Button (1929), Sunny Days (1928), People Don't Do Such Things (1927), The Gossipy Sex (1927), Just Married (1921), Honey Girl (1920), Come-on Charlie (1919), and Fair and Warmer (1916). He also performed in London in Just Married, The Hottentot, and Little Accident.

His film debut came in Little Miss Marker (1934).

== Personal life and death ==
Overman married Emily Helen Drange on November 4, 1922, in a double ceremony with popular bandleader Paul Whiteman and Vanda Hoff.

Overmann died in Santa Monica, California, on February 19, 1943, five days after having suffered his second heart attack in less than two months.

== Partial filmography ==
- The Perfect Crime (1928) - Newlywed (uncredited)
- Midnight (1934) - Joe Biggers
- Little Miss Marker (1934) - Regret
- The Great Flirtation (1934) - Joe Lang
- She Loves Me Not (1934) - Gus McNeal
- You Belong to Me (1934) - Brown - Theatre Manager
- Broadway Bill (1934) - Oscar 'Happy' McGuire
- Enter Madame (1935) - Mr. Farnum
- Rumba (1935) - Flash
- Paris in Spring (1935) - DuPont
- Men Without Names (1935) - Gabby Lambert
- Two for Tonight (1935) - Harry
- Collegiate (1936) - Sour-Puss
- Poppy (1936) - Attorney Eddie G. Whiffen
- Yours for the Asking (1936) - Honeysuckle
- Three Married Men (1936) - Jeff Mullins
- The Jungle Princess (1936) - Frank
- Don't Tell the Wife (1937) - Steven A. 'Steve' Dorsey
- Murder Goes to College (1937) - Henry 'Hank' Hyer
- Nobody's Baby (1937) - Det. Lt. Emory Littleworth
- Hotel Haywire (1937) - Dr. Parkhouse
- Wild Money (1937) - Perry Brown
- Blonde Trouble (1937) - Joe Hart
- Partners in Crime (1937) - Hank Hyer
- Night Club Scandal (1937) - Russell Kirk - Reporter
- True Confession (1937) - Bartender
- The Big Broadcast of 1938 (1938) - Scoop McPhail
- Her Jungle Love (1938) - Jimmy Wallace
- Hunted Men (1938) - Peter Harris
- Men with Wings (1938) - Hank Rinebow
- Spawn of the North (1938) - 'Jack' Jackson
- Sons of the Legion (1938) - Charles Lee
- Ride a Crooked Mile (1938) - Oklahoma
- Persons in Hiding (1939) - Agent Pete Griswold
- Union Pacific (1939) - Leach Overmile
- Death of a Champion (1939) - Oliver Quade
- Typhoon (1940) - Skipper Joe
- Edison, the Man (1940) - Bunt Cavatt
- Safari (1940) - Jock McPhail
- Northwest Mounted Police (1940) - Tod McDuff
- The Hard-Boiled Canary (1941) - George Thomas
- Caught in the Draft (1941) - Steve Riggs
- Aloma of the South Seas (1941) - Corky
- New York Town (1941) - Sam
- Roxie Hart (1942) - Jake Callahan
- Reap the Wild Wind (1942) - Captain Phillip Philpott
- The Forest Rangers (1942) - Jammer Jones
- Silver Queen (1942) - Hector Bailey
- Star Spangled Rhythm (1942) - Mark in Card Playing Skit
- Dixie (1943) - Mr. Whitlock
- The Desert Song (1943) - Johnny Walsh (final film role)
