= Betty Furness =

American actress, consumer advocate, and special assistant to the president (1916-1994)

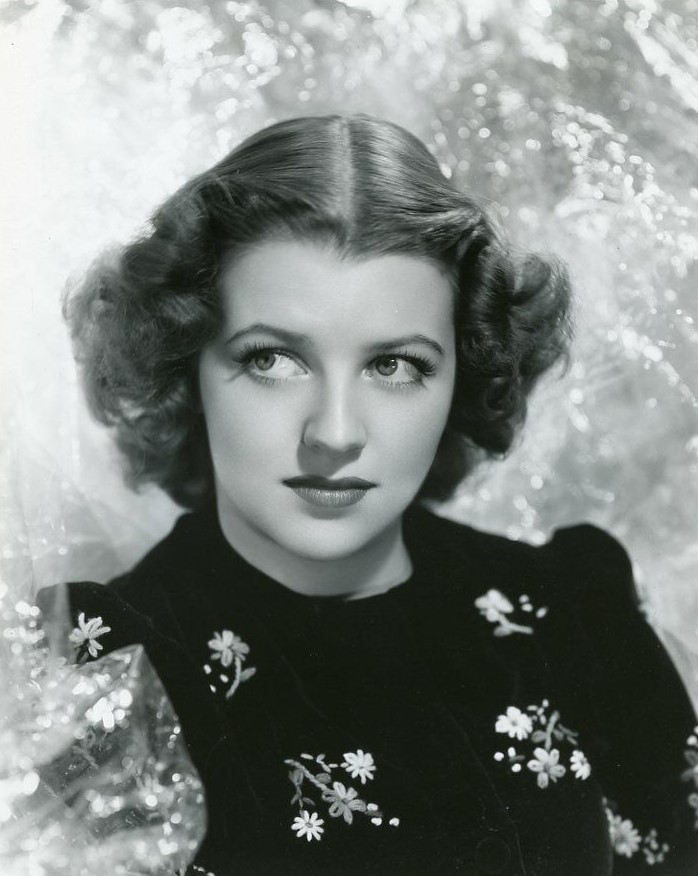
- Furness in 1937

2nd Special Assistant to the President for Consumer Affairs
- In office May 1, 1967 – January 20, 1969
- President: Lyndon B. Johnson
- Preceded by: Esther Peterson
- Succeeded by: Virginia Knauer

Personal details
- Born: Elizabeth Mary Furness; January 3, 1916 New York City, U.S.
- Died: April 2, 1994 (aged 78) New York City, U.S.
- Party: Democratic
- Spouse(s): Johnny Green (1937-1943; Hugh "Bud" Ernst (1945-1946; 1946-1950) (his death); Leslie Midgley (1967-1994) (her death)
- Children: 4
- Known for: Magnificent Obsession; Swing Time

Elizabeth Mary Furness (January 3, 1916 – April 2, 1994) was an American actress, consumer advocate, and current affairs commentator.

== Early years ==
Furness was born in Manhattan, the daughter of wealthy business executive George Choate Furness and his wife Florence. She attended the Brearley School and Bennett Junior College.

== Acting career ==
Furness made her stage debut in the school holidays in the title role of Alice in Wonderland. She also posed for commercial advertising. She began her professional career as a model before being noticed by a talent scout and being signed to a film contract in 1932 by RKO Studios. Her first film role was as the "Thirteenth Woman" in the film Thirteen Women (1932) but her scenes were deleted before the film's release.

Over the next few years, she appeared in several RKO films, and became a popular actress. Among her film successes were Magnificent Obsession (1935) and the Fred Astaire and Ginger Rogers film Swing Time (1936). By the end of the decade, she had appeared in over forty films, but during the 1940s, she found it difficult to secure acting roles.

== Career ==
In 1948, Furness was performing in the television series Studio One, which was broadcast live. She filled in for an actor to promote Westinghouse products during the advertisement break, and impressed the company with her easy and professional manner. They offered her a contract to promote their products and she thus became closely associated with them.

Early television commercials often utilized radio performers who had a difficult time adjusting to the visual medium of TV, leading to sometimes embarrassing incidents such as a Westinghouse commercial where a woman demonstrating an electric stove spilled hot chocolate all over it. Furness, due to her experience at Studio One, felt that she could do a better job. An advertising agency offered her a shot, and she found that she had a natural talent for commercials. Making $150 a week at first, Furness did three Westinghouse commercials (they were the sole sponsor of the show) for every episode of Studio One, all of them shot live, since videotape did not yet exist. (One live spot featured a refrigerator door that refused to open, causing one of the most famous bloopers in TV history; however, this was not Furness, but actress June Graham, who was substituting for her. For decades, Furness was "credited" for the blooper, until she set the record straight in the 1981 TV special TV's Censored Bloopers.)

Furness proved a successful spokeswoman because of her good looks and attractive, but neat and modest clothing, which she changed three times a day. She also proved strongly independent-minded about her appearance and image, refusing to adopt a stage name or wear an apron after Westinghouse offered these suggestions. She did however agree to wear a wedding ring on camera to appear more like a housewife. Furness also purchased all of her clothing herself, not wanting Westinghouse to decide her appearance for her. During the political party conventions in the 1952 presidential election, the television coverage of which was heavily sponsored by Westinghouse, Furness wore 28 different outfits, enough to become the subject of a Life story.

Furness's contract with Westinghouse eventually resulted in her receiving an annual salary of $100,000 and her advertisements caused sales of the company's appliances to soar, with the one notable exception of the dishwasher, which proved a hard sell after market research found that American women were reluctant to buy a device that would in effect completely automate their kitchen and give them nothing to do.

One of television's most recognizable series of commercials had Furness opening wide a refrigerator door, intoning, "You can be sure ... if it's Westinghouse." (The spots were so well known they were often parodied: one Mad magazine gag imagined the words on a neon sign, with a few key letters burned out: YOU CAN ..SU.E IF IT'S WESTINGHOUSE!")

Furness hosted ABC's Penthouse Party which ran for 39 episodes from September 1950 to June 1951. Furness was a regular panelist on the CBS panel show What's My Line? in 1951. She appeared in a series of live mysteries on ABC, under the title Your Kaiser Dealer Presents Kaiser-Frazer "Adventures In Mystery" Starring Betty Furness In "Byline" which ran in November and December 1951, and again on ABC in syndication in the fall of 1957. The series was produced by the DuMont Television Network and ran on DuMont under the title News Gal.

From January 1, 1953 through July 3, 1953, she appeared in her own daytime television series Meet Betty Furness, which was sponsored by Westinghouse. The quarter-hour talk program was broadcast on Friday mornings on CBS. In 1959, a new Westinghouse president decided to drop Furness, possibly because he wished to impose his own ideas on the company, and suggested getting a new, slightly younger spokeswoman. Despite some resistance from the company marketing department, he won out and Furness was released from her contract at the end of 1960. Her final spots for Westinghouse were seen within the CBS News coverage of the July 1960 Los Angeles Democratic Convention, the August 1960 Chicago Republican Convention and the evening of November 8 election returns. She then attempted to move into a less commercialized role in television, but found herself too closely associated with advertising to be taken seriously. During this time, she worked on radio and also on behalf of the Democratic Party.

Furness has two stars on the Hollywood Walk of Fame, for her contribution to motion pictures at 1533 Vine Street and for her contribution to television at 6675 Hollywood Blvd.

== Consumer advocacy ==
In 1967, President Lyndon B. Johnson, aware of her work for the Democratic Party, contacted Furness and offered her the position of Special Assistant for Consumer Affairs. She accepted the assignment and continued in this role until the end of the Johnson administration in 1969. During her tenure she silenced her critics by applying herself studiously to her role and learning the issues relating to consumer rights. From 1969 until 1993 she served as a board member for Consumers Union, publisher of Consumer Reports. She was appointed by Governor of New York Nelson Rockefeller in August 1970 to serve as the first chairman and executive director of the New York State Consumer Protection Board, and served in the position until July 1971 before returning to television. In 1971, Furness was elected to the Common Cause National Governing Board. In 1973 she also headed the New York City Department of Consumer Affairs.

Signed by WNBC in New York, Furness reported on consumer issues, and specifically targeted examples of consumer fraud. In 1976 she began an association with The Today Show filling in as anchor following the departure of Barbara Walters and providing regular reports. In 1977 her program Buyline: Betty Furness won the Peabody Award.

== Personal life ==
Furness married four times. Her first marriage was to composer-conductor Johnny Green in 1937, with whom she had one child. After her divorce from Green in 1943, she married radio announcer Hugh "Bud" Ernst Jr. twice - first in 1945, and again in 1946. Her second marriage to him lasted until his death in 1950 when, depressed over the breakup of their marriage, he shot himself after phoning a New York newspaper and declaring, "If you want a good story, come and get it". She married again in 1967 to Leslie Midgley, who survived her. Liza Snyder, from the CBS Television series Yes, Dear and Man with a Plan is her granddaughter.

In 1990, Furness was treated for stomach cancer, and cut down her schedule on The Today Show to four days. Her health continued to deteriorate until her death from stomach cancer on April 2, 1994, at age 78 in the Memorial Sloan Kettering Cancer Center.

== Partial filmography ==
- Renegades of the West (1932)
- Cross Fire (1933)
- Lucky Devils (1933)
- The Great Jasper (1933)
- Scarlet River (1933)
- Emergency Call (1933)
- Headline Shooter (1933)
- Midshipman Jack (1933)
- Aggie Appleby, Maker of Men (1933)
- Ace of Aces (1933) (uncredited)
- Flying Down to Rio (1933) (uncredited)
- Beggars in Ermine (1934)
- Dangerous Corner (1934)
- A Wicked Woman (1934)
- Gridiron Flash (1934)
- The Band Plays On (1934)
- The Life of Vergie Winters (1934)
- Here Comes Cookie (1935)
- Shadow of Doubt (1935)
- McFadden's Flats (1935)
- Calm Yourself (1935)
- The Keeper of the Bees (1935)
- Magnificent Obsession (1935)
- The Three Wise Guys (1936)
- The President's Mystery (1936)
- All American Chump (1936)
- Mr. Cinderella (1936)
- Swing Time (1936)
- They Wanted to Marry (1937)
- Mama Steps Out (1937)
- The Good Old Soak (1937)
- It Can't Last Forever (1937)
- North of Shanghai (1939)
- Tomorrow Always Comes (1941)
- Studio One
  - "Boy Meets Girl" (1949)
  - "A Special Announcement" (1956)
  - "Babe in the Woods" (1957) Coral, Princess Livitski
- A Face in the Crowd (1957) (uncredited cameo as herself)
