= Devil Ship =

1947 film

- Directed by: Lew Landers
- Written by: Lawrence Taylor
- Produced by: Martin Mooney
- Starring: Richard Lane; Louise Campbell; William Bishop
- Cinematography: Allen G. Sieger
- Edited by: James Sweeney
- Music by: Mischa Bakaleinikoff
- Production company: Columbia Pictures
- Distributed by: Columbia Pictures
- Release date: December 11, 1947
- Running time: 62 minutes
- Country: United States
- Language: English

Devil Ship is a 1947 American crime film directed by Lew Landers and starring Richard Lane, Louise Campbell and William Bishop. It was produced and distributed by Columbia Pictures.

== Cast ==
- Richard Lane as Bill Brown
- Louise Campbell as Madge Harris
- William Bishop as Sanderson
- Damian O'Flynn as Red Mason
- Myrna Liles as Jennie
- Anthony Caruso as Venetti
- Marc Krah as Mike
- Anthony Warde as Burke
- Denver Pyle as Carl
- William Forrest as Evans
- Marjorie Woodworth as Dolly
