= Porter Hall =

American actor (1888–1953)

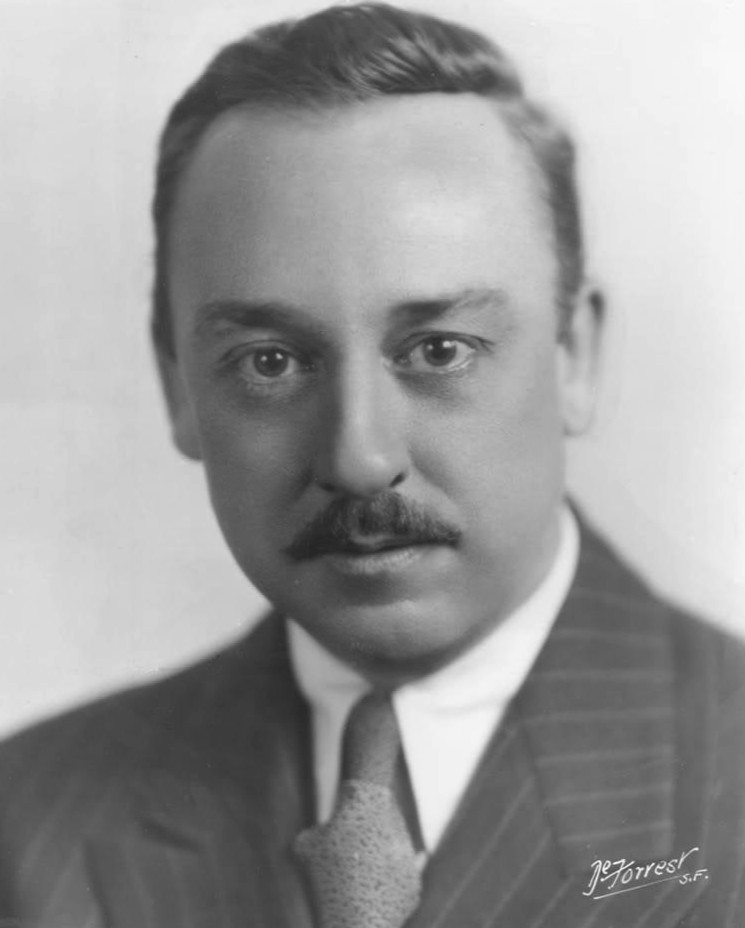
- Hall in 1930
- Born: Clifford Porter Hall; September 19, 1888; Cincinnati, Ohio, U.S.
- Died: October 6, 1953 (aged 65); Los Angeles, California, U.S.
- Occupation: Actor
- Years active: 1926–1953
- Spouse: Geraldine Brown (m. 1927)
- Children: 2

Clifford Porter Hall (September 19, 1888 – October 6, 1953) was an American character actor known for appearing in a number of films in the 1930s and 1940s. Hall typically played villains or comedic incompetent characters.

== Early years ==
Hall was born in Cincinnati, Ohio. His father, W.A. Hall, headed a cooperage business that ended because of prohibition in the United States. After graduating from the University of Cincinnati, Hall worked for the yeast maker Fleischmann Company while also directing and acting in little theater productions in Cleveland.

== Career ==
Hall's Broadway credits included The Great Gatsby (1926), Naked (1926), Loud Speaker (1927), Night Hostess (1928), It's a Wise Child (1929), Collision (1932), The Warrior's Husband (1932), The Dark Tower (1933), The Red Cat (1934).

Hall made his film debut in the 1931 drama Secrets of a Secretary. His last onscreen appearance was in the 1954 film Return to Treasure Island, which was released after his death.

Hall is best remembered for five roles: a senator in Mr. Smith Goes to Washington; an atheist in Going My Way; the nervous, ill-tempered Granville Sawyer, who administers a psychological test to Kris Kringle in Miracle on 34th Street; a train passenger who encounters a man (Fred MacMurray) who has just committed a murder in Double Indemnity; and the title character's lawyer (Herbert MacCaulay) in The Thin Man.

Hall appeared in a number of critically acclaimed films, now regarded as classics, and worked with many high-profile directors including W.S. Van Dyke, William Dieterle, Lewis Milestone, Cecil B. DeMille, Leo McCarey, Henry Hathaway, Frank Lloyd, William A. Wellman, Frank Capra, Howard Hawks, Raoul Walsh, Preston Sturges, Charles Vidor, Billy Wilder, Clarence Brown, William Castle, George Seaton and Richard Thorpe.

He appeared in three films listed on AFI's 100 Years... 100 Movies, a list of the 100 greatest films in American cinema; Mr. Smith Goes to Washington (1939), Sullivan's Travels (1941) and Double Indemnity (1944).

Hall also appeared in six films that were nominated for the Academy Award for Best Picture, including The Thin Man (1934), The Story of Louis Pasteur (1936), Mr. Smith Goes to Washington (1939), Double Indemnity (1944), Going My Way (the 1944 winner) and Miracle on 34th Street (1947).

He also appeared in ten films selected by the Library of Congress for preservation in the National Film Registry as being "culturally, historically or aesthetically significant", including:

- The Thin Man (1934)
- Make Way for Tomorrow (1937)
- Mr. Smith Goes to Washington (1939)
- His Girl Friday (1940)
- Sullivan's Travels (1941)
- The Miracle of Morgan's Creek (1944)
- Double Indemnity (1944)
- Going My Way (1944)
- Miracle on 34th Street (1947)
- Ace in the Hole (1951)

== Personal life ==
Hall married actress Geraldine Brown in 1927. He served as a deacon at First Presbyterian Church of Hollywood for many years.

On October 6, 1953, Hall died of a heart attack in Los Angeles, California, at the age of 65. His interment was at Forest Lawn - Hollywood Hills Cemetery.

== Complete filmography ==
Year	Film	Role	Director	Notes
1931	Secrets of a Secretary	Drunk	George Abbott	uncredited
1931	The Cheat	Leslie	George Abbott	uncredited
1934	The Thin Man	MacCaulay	W.S. Van Dyke	
1934	Murder in the Private Car	Alden Murray	Harry Beaumont	
1935	The Case of the Lucky Legs	Col. Bradbury	Archie Mayo	
1936	The Petrified Forest	Jason Maple	Archie Mayo	
1936	The Story of Louis Pasteur	Dr. Rossignol	William Dieterle	
1936	Too Many Parents	Mr. Saunders	Robert F. McGowan	
1936	Snowed Under	Arthur Layton	Ray Enright	
1936	The Princess Comes Across	Robert M. Darcy	William K. Howard	
1936	And Sudden Death	District Attorney	Charles Barton	
1936	Satan Met a Lady	Milton Ames	William Dieterle	
1936	The General Died at Dawn	Peter Perrie	Lewis Milestone	
1936	The Plainsman	Jack McCall	Cecil B. DeMille	
1936	Let's Make a Million	Spencer	Ray McCarey	
1937	Bulldog Drummond Escapes	Norman Merridew	James P. Hogan	
1937	King of Gamblers	George Kramer	Robert Florey; John E. Burch (assistant)	
1937	Make Way for Tomorrow	Harvey Chase	Leo McCarey	
1937	Hotel Haywire	Judge Newhall	George Archainbaud	
1937	Wild Money	Bill Court	Louis King	
1937	Souls at Sea	Court Prosecutor	Henry Hathaway	
1937	This Way Please	S.J. Crawford	Robert Florey	
1937	True Confession	Mr. Hartman	Wesley Ruggles	
1937	Wells Fargo	James Oliver	Frank Lloyd	
1938	Scandal Street	James Wilson	James P. Hogan	
1938	Dangerous to Know	Mayor Bradley	Robert Florey	
1938	Bulldog Drummond's Peril	Dr. Max Botulian	James P. Hogan	
1938	Stolen Heaven	Hermann 'Von' Offer	Andrew L. Stone	
1938	Prison Farm	Chiston R. Bradby	Louis King	
1938	Men with Wings	Hiram F. Jenkins	William A. Wellman	
1938	King of Alcatraz	Matthew Talbot	Robert Florey	
1938	The Arkansas Traveler	Mayor Daniels	Alfred Santell	
1938	Tom Sawyer, Detective	Uncle Silas	Louis King	
1939	Grand Jury Secrets	Anthony Pelton	James P. Hogan	
1939	They Shall Have Music	Flower	Archie Mayo	
1939	Mr. Smith Goes to Washington	Senator Monroe	Frank Capra	
1939	Henry Goes Arizona	Banker Edward G. Walsh	Edwin L. Marin	uncredited
1940	His Girl Friday	Murphy	Howard Hawks	
1940	Dark Command	Angus McCloud	Raoul Walsh	
1940	Arizona	Lazarus Ward	Wesley Ruggles	
1940	Trail of the Vigilantes	Sheriff Korley	Allan Dwan	
1941	The Parson of Panamint	Jonathan Randall	William C. McGann	
1941	Sullivan's Travels	Mr. Hadrian	Preston Sturges	
1942	Mr. and Mrs. North	George Heyler	Robert B. Sinclair	
1942	The Remarkable Andrew	Chief Clerk Art Slocumb	Stuart Heisler	
1942	Butch Minds the Baby	Brandy Smith	Albert S. Rogell	
1943	A Stranger in Town	Judge Austin Harkley	Roy Rowland; John E. Burch (assistant)	
1943	The Desperadoes	Banker Clanton	Charles Vidor	
1943	The Miracle of Morgan's Creek	Justice of the Peace	Preston Sturges	
1943	The Woman of the Town	Mayor Dog Killey	George Archainbaud	
1944	Standing Room Only	Hugo Farenhall	Sidney Lanfield	
1944	Going My Way	Mr. Belknap	Leo McCarey	
1944	Double Indemnity	Mr. Jackson	Billy Wilder	
1944	The Great Moment	President Franklin Pierce	Preston Sturges	
1944	The Mark of the Whistler	Joe Sorsby	William Castle	
1945	Bring on the Girls	Dr. Efrington	Sidney Lanfield	
1945	Blood on the Sun	Arthur Bickett	Frank Lloyd	
1945	Murder, He Says	Mr. Johnson	George Marshall	
1945	Week-End at the Waldorf	Stevens	Robert Z. Leonard	
1945	Kiss and Tell	Bill Franklin	Richard Wallace	
1947	Miracle on 34th Street	Granville Sawyer	George Seaton	
1947	Singapore	Mr. Gerald Bellows	John Brahm	
1947	Unconquered	Leach	Cecil B. DeMille	
1948	You Gotta Stay Happy	Mr. Caslon	H.C. Potter	
1948	That Wonderful Urge	Attorney Ketchell	Robert B. Sinclair	
1949	Chicken Every Sunday	Sam Howell	George Seaton	
1949	The Beautiful Blonde from Bashful Bend	Judge O'Toole	Preston Sturges	
1949	Intruder in the Dust	Nub Gowrie	Clarence Brown	
1951	Ace in the Hole	Jacob Q. Boot	Billy Wilder	
1952	Carbine Williams	Sam Markley	Richard Thorpe	
1952	The Half-Breed	Kraemer	Stuart Gilmore	
1952	Holiday for Sinners	Pool Hall Proprietor	Gerald Mayer	
1953	Pony Express	Jim Bridger	Jerry Hopper	
1953	Vice Squad	Jack Hartrampf	Arnold Laven	
1954	Return to Treasure Island	Maximillian 'Maxie' Harris	Ewald André Dupont	released posthumously
