= Byline (TV series) =

TV series of live mysteries

- Starring: Betty Furness
- Country of origin: United States

Original release
- Network: ABC
- Release: November 4 – December 9, 1951

Your Kaiser Dealer Presents Kaiser-Frazer "Adventures In Mystery" Starring Betty Furness in "Byline" is a brief series of live mysteries that aired from November 4 through December 9, 1951, on ABC television.

In the 1950s, when companies directly sponsored entire TV programs, it was not unusual for a sponsor to place its name directly on the title of the show (such as The US Steel Hour or The Bell Telephone Hour). The full fourteen-word title by sponsor Kaiser Motors is believed to be the longest for any program in US television history.

The show was usually known simply as Byline during its six-week prime time run, and as News Gal when the series aired Saturdays at noon on the DuMont Television Network for two weeks in October 1951.

Betty Furness portrayed a newswoman who fought espionage. Other actors featured in the program included Don Cherry, Hank Frost, David Ross, and Bill Stern.
