= All American Chump =

1936 film by Edwin L. Marin

- Directed by: Edwin L. Marin
- Screenplay by: Lawrence Kimble
- Produced by: Michael Fessier; Lucien Hubbard
- Starring: Stuart Erwin; Robert Armstrong; Betty Furness; Edmund Gwenn; Harvey Stephens
- Cinematography: Charles G. Clarke
- Edited by: Frank E. Hull
- Music by: William Axt
- Production company: Metro-Goldwyn-Mayer
- Distributed by: Loew's Inc.
- Release date: October 16, 1936
- Running time: 63 minutes
- Country: United States
- Language: English

All American Chump is a 1936 American comedy film produced by MGM, directed by Edwin L. Marin and written by Lawrence Kimble. The film stars Stuart Erwin, Robert Armstrong, Betty Furness, Edmund Gwenn and Harvey Stephens.

== Plot ==
When a traveling carnival comes to a small farming town, so many of the locals are cheated that they trash the carnival. Promoter Bill Hogan goes to the local bank to raise money to get out of town before the carnival's bills catch up with it, and sees that instead of an adding machine the bank is using Elmer Lamb, a meek clerk who is a calculating prodigy. Hogan hires him as "Chain Lightning" and displays Elmer in competition with an adding machine, but the public is not interested. Then the sheriff arrives and attaches the carnival's assets.

To get a fresh start, Bill travels east with his girlfriend Kitty and her father, the carnival's alcoholic owner Jeff Crane. They take Elmer, and although his fondest attachment has been to three dairy cows that he has been allowed to visit, he instantly falls for Kitty. Also on the train is bridge champion J. Montgomery Brantley, who would like a game. Elmer has played some whist, but no one will play with him because he always wins. At that he is talked into playing bridge for the first time against Brantley. With 10¢ in his pocket, he accepts the proposed stakes of 10¢, but after winning several times he learns this means 10¢ per point and he has earned a sizable sum.

Learning of this, Jeff and Bill now make sure that the newspapers report Brantley's defeat, thus endangering his career as a bridge writer. Eventually a nationally broadcast challenge match is set up: fifty rubbers of bridge over eight days, for a prize of $15,000. Elmer falls behind at first, then takes the lead. But gangsters get involved and offer Elmer money to lose the match. On the final day, they kidnap Elmer to threaten him. He is rescued, but in the confusion, Jeff accidentally knocks him out with a blow to the head, and when Elmer recovers, his calculating powers have vanished. In desperation Jeff arranges to hit him on the head again, but this only makes him worse. Then he suggests Kitty pretend temporarily that she loves Elmer. She reluctantly goes along and that does the trick: Elmer is back in form.

After Elmer wins the match, Jeff reveals the deception to him, and he heartbrokenly makes his way back home; but at the same time Kitty is breaking up with Bill. When Elmer gets back to his bank, he finds they have replaced him with an adding machine. He goes to visit the cows; at least they are still there. But so is Kitty. She really does love him, and has used the winnings he left behind to buy him the farm.

== Cast ==
- Stuart Erwin as Elmer Lamb
- Robert Armstrong as Bill Hogan
- Betty Furness as Kitty Crane
- Edmund Gwenn as Jeffrey Crane
- Harvey Stephens as Jim Crawford
- Edward Brophy as Pudgy Murphy
- E. E. Clive as J. Montgomery Brantley
- Dewey Robinson as Al
- Eddie Shubert as Butch
- Spencer Charters as Abiah Smith
- George Chandler as Bank Clerk
