= Men with Wings =

1938 film by William A. Wellman

- Photobook image derived from theatrical poster
- Directed by: William A. Wellman
- Written by: Robert Carson
- Produced by: William A. Wellman; William LeBaron (executive producer; uncredited)
- Starring: Fred MacMurray; Ray Milland; Louise Campbell
- Cinematography: W. Howard Greene
- Edited by: Thomas Scott
- Music by: Gerard Carbonara; W. Franke Harling
- Distributed by: Paramount Pictures
- Release dates: July 16, 1938 (New York City); October 28, 1938 (United States)
- Running time: 105 minutes
- Country: United States
- Language: English
- Budget: $2 million
- Box office: $2 million (U.S. and Canada rentals)

Men with Wings is a 1938 American Technicolor war film, directed by William A. Wellman and starring Fred MacMurray, Ray Milland, and Louise Campbell. Donald O'Connor also has a small part as the younger version of MacMurray's character. The two would soon star in the film Sing You Sinners together along with Bing Crosby.

== Plot ==
In 1903, the Wright brothers set the scene for aviation's advances and influence barnstormer, Pat Falconer and his friend, engineer Scott Barnes. Falconer marries childhood sweetheart Peggy Ransom although Barnes also loves her, but is unwilling to jeopardize his relationship with his friend.

During World War I, Falconer becomes a fighter pilot and after the war continues to fly by "the seat-of-his-pants" rather than do the methodical work of flight research like Barnes. As the 1930s come to a close, restless Falconer leaves his family and friend behind, taking off for China to fight Japanese invaders.

== Cast ==
- Fred MacMurray as Pat Falconer
- Ray Milland as Scott Barnes
- Louise Campbell as Peggy Ranson
- Andy Devine as Joe Gibbs
- Lynne Overman as Hank Rinebow
- Porter Hall as Hiram F. Jenkins
- Walter Abel as Nick Ranson
- Kitty Kelly as Martha Ranson
- Virginia Weidler as Peggy Ranson at eight
- Donald O'Connor as Pat Falconer at 13
- Billy Cook as Scott Barnes at 10
- James Burke as J.A. Nolan
- Willard Robertson as Col. Hadley
- Dennis Morgan as Galton
- Frank Clarke as Burke
- Evelyn Keyes as a nurse (uncredited)

== Production ==
For Men with Wings, Wellman was able to utilize a vast amount of talent and resources to stage the epic. Besides the impressive array of movie talent, the film was one of the first Hollywood productions to utilize the Technicolor three-strip camera process pioneered by the Technicolor Motion Picture Corporation. (Note: The Technicolor three-strip process was advertised as "Glorious Technicolor".)

Wellman had a special affinity to both the story and aviation in general. In World War I, earning himself the nickname "Wild Bill", Wellman was first an ambulance driver in the Norton-Harjes Ambulance Corps, then joined the French Foreign Legion. On December 3, 1917, assigned as the first American fighter pilot to join N.87 escadrille in the Lafayette Flying Corps, Wellman went on to score three recorded "kills", along with five probables and to receive the Croix de Guerre with two palms.

The use of mocked-up Nieuport 28 and Thomas-Morse Scout fighters along with other period aircraft such as one real Fokker D.VII and the ubiquitous Travelair "Wichita Fokkers" were featured in the aerial sequences. (Note: Lafayette Escadrille used footage from Men with Wings with the color removed. The later 1958 feature was also directed by Wellman and is far inferior in every respect to Men with Wings.) Principal photography took place primarily at California airport locales. Hollywood stunt pilot Paul Mantz was involved in both flying and directing the aerial filming.

Buhl LA-1 Pup representing early monoplane design (screenshot, note the color)

=== Aircraft used in the film ===
Men with Wings chronicles the "Golden Era" of aviation (1903–1938), featuring a number of significant aircraft in the production, including:

- Airco DH.4
- Boeing 247
- Boeing P-12E
- Buhl LA-1 Pup
- Fokker D.VII
- Lockheed Vega
- Garland-Lincoln: LF-1
- Pfalz D.XII
- Royal Aircraft Factory S.E.5
- SPAD S.VII
- Thomas-Morse Scout
- Travel Air Model B "Wichita Fokker"

== Reception ==
Men with Wings received good reviews from critics and audience alike. Variety noted the film "is a giant bomber from the Paramount hangar, designed on a lavish scale by the skilled air picture mechanic, William A. Wellman, and polished off beautifully in Technicolor. The action scenes, including a dog fight in the air, are exceptionally impressive." Men with Wings was considered an aviation classic, "one of the best pre-war flight films, true to life, and done without replicas ... A buff's dream." The juxtaposing of a love interest, however, was jarring, with critics commenting on that plotline being forced.
