= Tip-Off Girls =

1938 film by Louis King

- Theatrical release poster
- Directed by: Louis King
- Screenplay by: Maxwell Shane; Robert Yost; Stuart Anthony
- Produced by: William LeBaron
- Starring: Mary Carlisle; Lloyd Nolan; Roscoe Karns; Buster Crabbe; J. Carrol Naish; Evelyn Brent; Anthony Quinn
- Cinematography: Theodor Sparkuhl
- Edited by: Ellsworth Hoagland
- Music by: Leo Shuken
- Production company: Paramount Pictures
- Distributed by: Paramount Pictures
- Release date: April 1, 1938
- Running time: 61 minutes
- Country: United States
- Language: English

Tip-Off Girls is a 1938 American crime film directed by Louis King, written by Maxwell Shane, Robert Yost and Stuart Anthony, and starring Mary Carlisle, Lloyd Nolan, Roscoe Karns, Buster Crabbe, J. Carrol Naish, Evelyn Brent and Anthony Quinn. It was released on April 1, 1938, by Paramount Pictures.

== Plot ==
A ring of truck hijackers is organized by Joseph Valkus, run by Red Deegan and fronted by Rena Terry, a woman who pretends to be helpless, tricking truckers to trust her before their shipments are stolen.

Out to bust up the racket, the FBI assigns agents Bob Anders and Tom Benson to go undercover. Pretending to be drivers, then thieves, they gain Valkus's trust. Bob also meets and falls for Marjorie Rogers, a secretary who is totally unaware of the illegal activities.

Bob is overheard tipping off the FBI to the next heist. He is beaten by Valkus's men, but Marjorie manages to write and deliver a note that brings federal agents to the rescue.

== Cast ==
- Mary Carlisle as Marjorie Rogers
- Lloyd Nolan as Bob Anders
- Roscoe Karns as Tom Benson
- Buster Crabbe as John A. 'Red' Deegan
- J. Carrol Naish as Joseph Valkus
- Evelyn Brent as Rena Terry
- Anthony Quinn as Marty
- Benny Baker as Scotty
- Harvey Stephens as Chief Agent Jason Baardue
- Irving Bacon as Sam
- Gertrude Short as 'Boots' Milburn
- Archie Twitchell as Hensler
- Barlowe Borland as Blacky
- Pierre Watkin as George Murkil
