= The Three Wise Guys =

1936 film by George B. Seitz

- Directed by: George B. Seitz
- Screenplay by: Elmer Harris; Damon Runyon
- Produced by: Harry Rapf
- Starring: Robert Young; Betty Furness; Raymond Walburn; Thurston Hall; Bruce Cabot; Donald Meek
- Cinematography: Jackson Rose
- Edited by: Frank E. Hull
- Music by: William Axt
- Production company: Metro-Goldwyn-Mayer
- Distributed by: Metro-Goldwyn-Mayer
- Release date: May 15, 1936
- Running time: 73 minutes
- Country: United States
- Language: English

The Three Wise Guys is a 1936 American drama film directed by George B. Seitz, written by Elmer Harris and Damon Runyon, and starring Robert Young, Betty Furness, Raymond Walburn, Thurston Hall, Bruce Cabot and Donald Meek. It was released on May 15, 1936, by Metro-Goldwyn-Mayer. It is based on a short story of the same name, published by Damon Runyon in 1933.

== Plot ==
On Christmas Day, railroad tycoon Hatcher prefers work over celebration, while his son Joe enjoys having fun. During the trip, Joe meets Clarabelle Brooks, who faints due to hunger. A doctor revives her, and fellow passenger Blackie Swanson raises money for her. Clarabelle, secretly working with con-men Doc and Blackie, plans to entrap Joe in a breach of promise suit. Joe falls in love with Clarabelle and helps her get a modeling job, but his father disapproves. Meanwhile, Blackie grows jealous of their relationship.

When Joe proposes, Clarabelle realizes she's in love with him, and they elope. However, after Joe's father disowns them, they move to a struggling farm in Pennsylvania. When their house burns down, they move into the barn, and their landlord, Mr. Baumgarden, gets Joe a factory job. In New York, Doc and Blackie learn of a former conman, Ambersham, who is now in business. They blackmail him for money, but Ambersham sets up Joe to be blamed for a robbery. Joe is kidnapped, framed, and arrested for the crime.

Three months later, on Christmas Eve, Doc, Blackie, and a former robber, Yegg, look for robbery money that was hidden by Yegg in a barn back in Pennsylvania and find there Clarabelle giving birth to Joe's baby in the same barn. Doc helps her and later, Blackie clears Joe's name by paying Baumgarden with the robbery money and revealing Joe's true identity as Hatcher's son. As the trio leaves town, the viewer discovers that the name of this town is Bethlehem. The following Christmas, the Hatcher family reunites, with Joe working happily while his father and Clarabelle care for the baby.

== Cast ==
- Robert Young as Joe Hatcher
- Betty Furness as Clarabelle Brooks
- Raymond Walburn as Doc Brown
- Thurston Hall as Hatcher
- Bruce Cabot as Blackie
- Donald Meek as Gribbie
- Herman Bing as Baumgarten
- Harvey Stephens as Ambersham
- Harry Tyler as Yegg
- Pat West as Bartender
- Guy Edward Hearn as Cop
- Alex Melesh as Waiter
