= Wild Money =

1937 film by Louis King

- Theatrical release poster
- Directed by: Louis King
- Screenplay by: Paul Gallico; Edward T. Lowe, Jr. Marguerite Roberts; Eddie Welch
- Produced by: Stuart Walker
- Starring: Edward Everett Horton; Louise Campbell; Lynne Overman; Lucien Littlefield; Esther Dale; Porter Hall
- Cinematography: Henry Sharp
- Edited by: Stuart Gilmore
- Production company: Paramount Pictures
- Distributed by: Paramount Pictures
- Release date: July 9, 1937
- Running time: 71 minutes
- Country: United States
- Language: English

Wild Money is a 1937 American comedy film directed by Louis King and written by Paul Gallico, Edward T. Lowe, Jr., Marguerite Roberts and Eddie Welch. The film stars Edward Everett Horton, Louise Campbell, Lynne Overman, Lucien Littlefield, Esther Dale and Porter Hall. The film was released on July 9, 1937, by Paramount Pictures.

== Cast ==
- Edward Everett Horton as P.E. Dodd
- Louise Campbell as Judy McGowan
- Lynne Overman as Perry Brown
- Lucien Littlefield as Bill Hawkins
- Esther Dale as Jenny Hawkins
- Porter Hall as Bill Court
- Benny Baker as Al Vogel
- Ruth Coleman as Mrs. West
- Louis Natheaux as Cyrus K. West
- Billy Lee as Malcolm West
- Howard M. Mitchell as Sheriff Jones
- William Burress as Spreckett
- Gertrude Short as Miss Green
