= Harvey Stephens =

American actor (1901–1986)

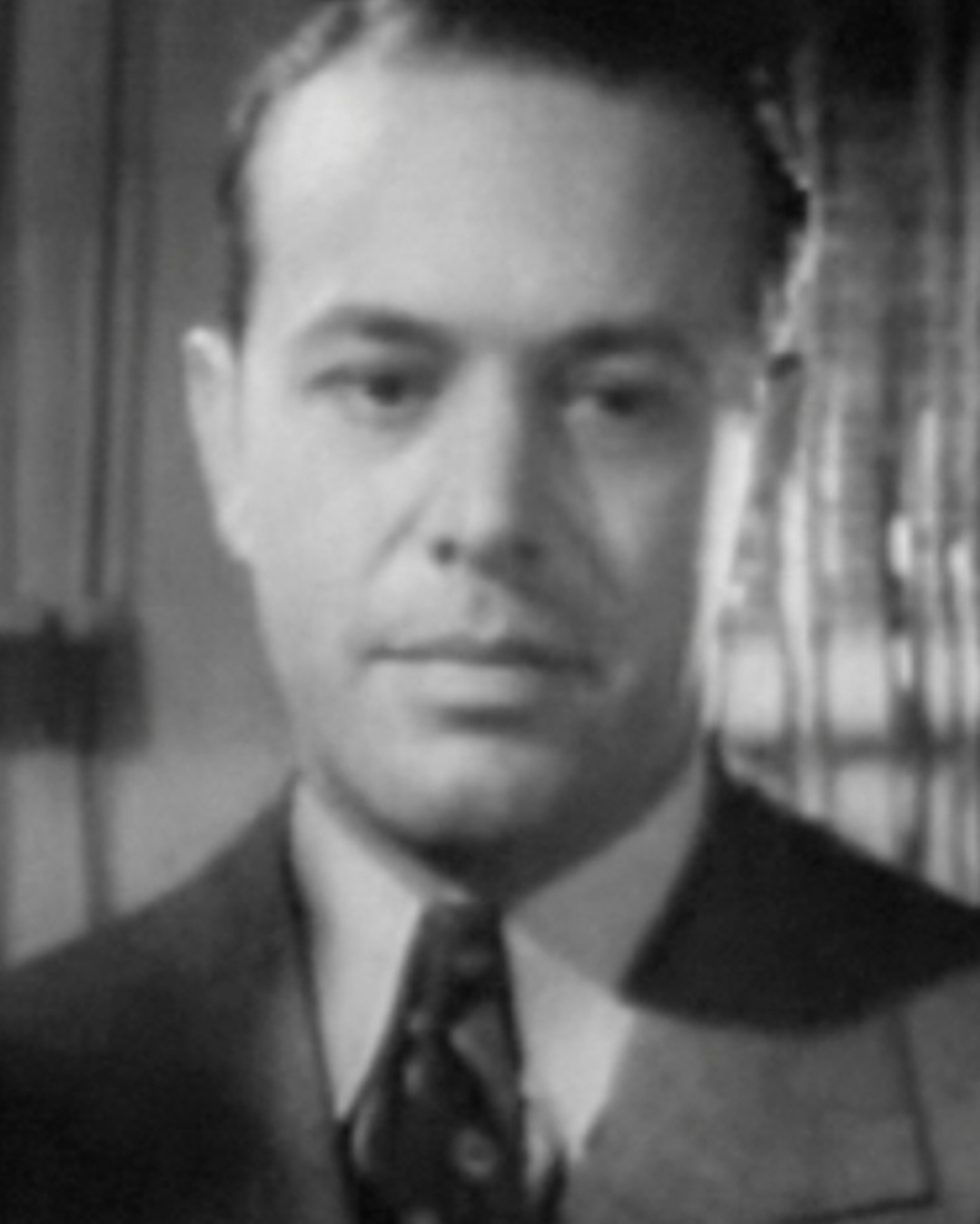
- Stephens in Swing High, Swing Low (1937)
- Born: August 21, 1901; Los Angeles, California, U.S.
- Died: December 22, 1986 (aged 85); Laguna Hills, California, U.S.
- Occupation: Actor
- Years active: 1931–1965
- Spouse(s): Beatrice Nichols (m. 1929; div. 1944) Barbara Adams (m. 1946)
- Children: 2

Harvey Stephens (August 21, 1901 – December 22, 1986) was an American actor, known initially for his performances in Broadway productions, and thereafter for his work in film and on television. He was most active in film beginning in the 1930s and through the mid-1940s. Beginning in the mid-1950s, he transitioned to television and enjoyed success there through the 1960s.

Stephens was also an avid competitive glider pilot. He was inducted into the Soaring Hall of Fame in 1966 for his contributions to the sport.

== Early years ==
Stephens was born on August 21, 1901, in Los Angeles, California. As a student at the University of California at Los Angeles, he earned letters in basketball and football. Before he turned to acting, Stephens worked in western copper mines and Mexican oil fields in addition to working around the world on a freighter.

== Stage ==
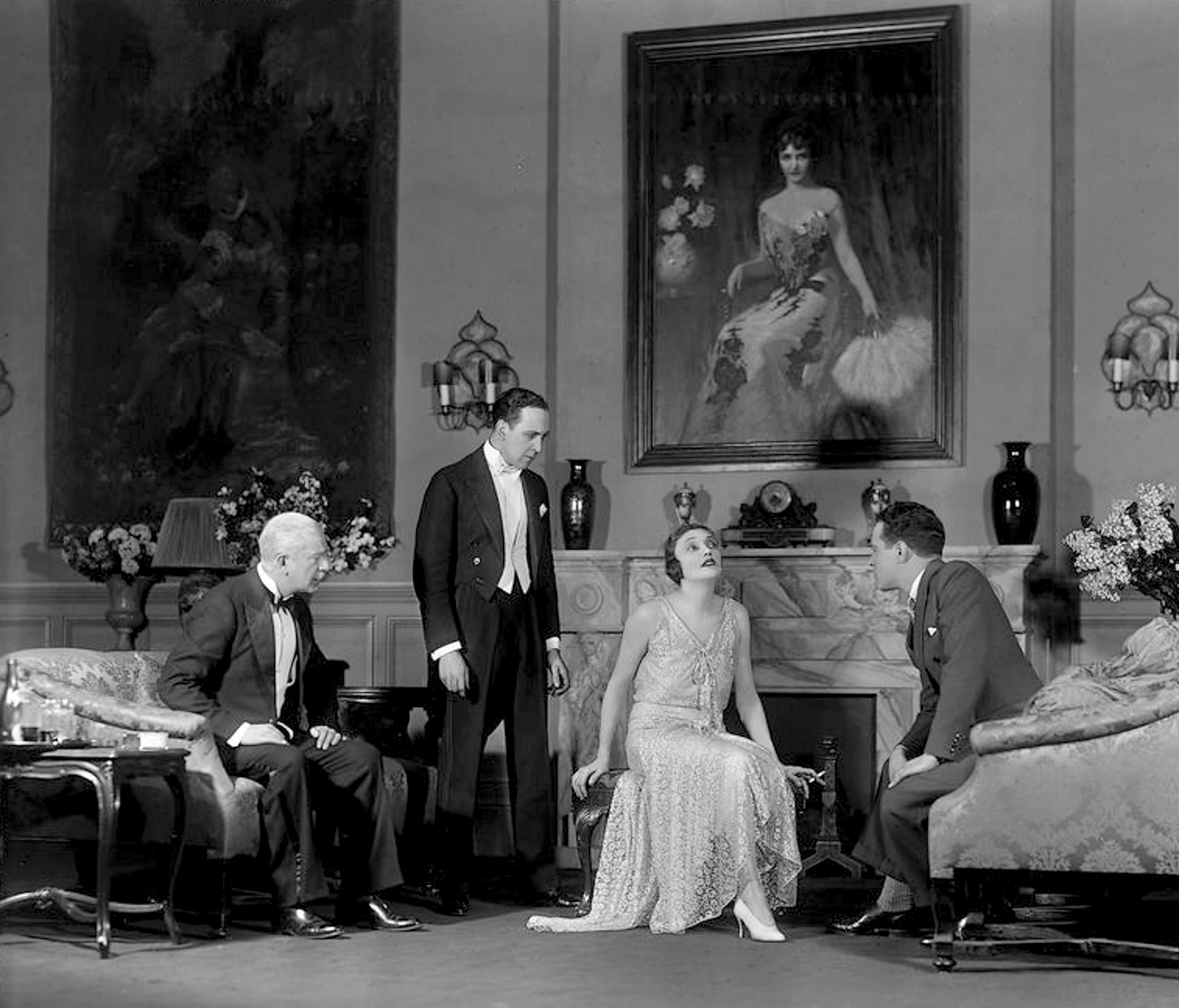
Stephens (right) opposite Katharine Cornell in the 1930 Broadway production of Dishonored Lady

Stephens' debut in the theater came in 1920 at the Pilgrimage Play in Hemet, California. Following that, he toured for two years in a troupe headed by Walter Hampden and worked in stock theater companies in several cities.

On Broadway, Stephens appeared as Sam Worthing in Other Men's Wives, written by Walter Hackett, late in 1929. He also appeared as Richard Wadsworth in Dishonored Lady (1930); as Gail Redman in Tomorrow and Tomorrow (1931); as Joe Fisk in The Animal Kingdom (1932); Fred Barton in Best Years (1932); Bruce Blakely in The Party's Over (1933); and John Palmer in Conquest (1933). He also appeared in South Pacific as Commander Harbison, alongside Mary Martin; he was one of only two cast members who did not sing.

For the summer of 1931, Stephens was a member of the Summer stock cast at Elitch Theatre.

== Film ==
Stephens made his leading debut opposite Tallulah Bankhead in The Cheat (1931). After appearing in The Texans (1938) and The Oklahoma Kid (1939), he began appearing in many Western films, although he also appeared with Gary Cooper, Joan Leslie, and Walter Brennan in Sergeant York (1941).

== Television ==
Stephens appeared on a number of television shows beginning in the early 1950s and continuing through the late 1960s, including The Aquanauts, Ripcord, 77 Sunset Strip, Ben Casey and The Many Loves of Dobie Gillis, as well as multiple episodes of Alfred Hitchcock Presents, Wagon Train, Bat Masterson, Perry Mason, and Bonanza.

== Activities outside of acting ==
Beginning in the late 1930s, Stephens was one of the earliest major proponents of gliders, and pursued an interest in the sport throughout his life. In 1937, Harland Ross custom built a glider for Stephens, which became the Ross RS-1 Zanonia (The "RS" designation stands for "Ross-Stephens"). He organized a number of competitions and was still participating after his retirement from acting into the 1960s.

== Personal life ==
On January 20, 1946, Stephens married Barbara Adams, a stage director. He had previously been married to stage actress Beatrice Nichols.

== Partial filmography ==
- The Cheat (1931) – Jeffrey Carlyle
- Paddy the Next Best Thing (1933) – Jack Breen
- Jimmy and Sally (1933) – Ralph Andrews
- The Worst Woman in Paris? (1933) – John Strong
- Sleepers East (1934) – Martin Knox (uncredited)
- Evelyn Prentice (1934) – Lawrence Kennard
- After Office Hours (1935) – Tommy Bannister
- One New York Night (1935) – Collis
- Baby Face Harrington (1935) – Ronald
- Let 'Em Have It (1935) – Van Rensseler
- The Murder Man (1935) – Henry Mander
- Orchids to You (1935) – George Draper
- It's in the Air (1935) – Sidney Kendall
- Whipsaw (1935) – Ed Dexter
- Tough Guy (1936) – Chief Davison
- Robin Hood of El Dorado (1936) – Captain Osborne
- Absolute Quiet (1936) – Barney Tait
- The Three Wise Guys (1936) – Ambersham
- Sworn Enemy (1936) – District Attorney Paul Scott
- All American Chump (1936) – Jim Crawford
- Maid of Salem (1937) – Dr. John Harding
- Murder Goes to College (1937) – Paul Broderick
- Swing High, Swing Low (1937) – Harvey Howell
- King of Gamblers (1937) – J.G. Temple
- Night of Mystery (1937) – Dr. Von Blon
- Forlorn River (1937) – Les Setter
- Night Club Scandal (1937) – Frank Marsh
- Dangerous to Know (1938) – Philip Easton
- Tip-Off Girls (1938) – Chief Agent Jason Baardue
- The Texans (1938) – Lieutenant David Nichols
- The Oklahoma Kid (1939) – Ned Kincaid
- The House of Fear (1939) - Richard 'Dick' Pierce
- You Can't Get Away with Murder (1939) – Fred Burke
- Grand Jury Secrets (1939) – Michael Keefe
- Beau Geste (1939) – Lieutenant Martin
- Abe Lincoln in Illinois (1940) – Ninian Edwards
- The Fighting 69th (1940) – Major Anderson
- Parole Fixer (1940) – Bartley Hanford
- Stagecoach War (1940) – Neal Holt
- When the Daltons Rode (1940) – Rigby
- The Texas Rangers Ride Again (1940) – Ranger Blair
- Sergeant York (1941) – Captain Danforth
- Our Wife (1941) – Dr. Cassell
- Joe Smith, American (1942) – Freddie Dunhill
- The Lady Is Willing (1942) – Dr. Golding
- The Courtship of Andy Hardy (1942) – Roderick O. Nesbit
- Tombstone, the Town Too Tough to Die (1942) – Morgan Earp
- George Washington Slept Here (1942) – Jeff Douglas
- Lady in the Dark (1944) – Liza's Father
- The Story of Dr. Wassell (1944) – Captain in Charge of Evacuation (uncredited)
- Three Young Texans (1954) – Jim Colt
- Cell 2455, Death Row (1955) – Prison Warden
- The Girl in the Red Velvet Swing (1955) – Dr. Hollingshead DDS
- Alfred Hitchcock Presents (1956) (Season 2 Episode 7: "Alibi Me") - Lieutenant James Larkin
- Oregon Passage (1957) – Captain Boyson
- Wagon Train (1958) S1 E39 "The Sacramento Story" - Maxwell Revere
- Alfred Hitchcock Presents (1958) (Season 3 Episode 25: "Flight to the East") - European Bureau Manager
- The World Was His Jury (1958) – Judge Arthur Farrell
- Official Detective "Tinseled Alibi" – Houston – (1958)
- The Young Lions (1958) – Brigadier General Sam Rockland (uncredited)
- In Love and War (1958) – Amory Newcombe
- North by Northwest (1959) – US Intelligence Agency official (uncredited)
- The Bat (1959) – John Fleming
- The Flight That Disappeared (1961) – Walter Cooper
- Diary of a Madman (1963) – Louis Girot
- Advance to the Rear (1964) – General Dunlop (uncredited)
- Joy in the Morning (1965) – Dr. Marson
