= Dead Men Walk =

1943 film by Sam Newfield

- Film poster for Dead Men Walk
- Directed by: Sam Newfield
- Written by: Fred Myton
- Produced by: Sigmund Neufeld
- Starring: Dwight Frye; George Zucco; Mary Carlisle; Nedrick Young; Forrest Taylor
- Cinematography: Jack Greenhalgh
- Edited by: Holbrook N. Todd
- Music by: Leo Erdody
- Distributed by: Producers Releasing Corporation
- Release date: February 10, 1943
- Running time: 64 minutes
- Country: United States
- Language: English

Dead Men Walk is a 1943 American horror film produced by Sigmund Neufeld for Producers Releasing Corporation (PRC). It is an original story and screenplay by Fred Myton, starring George Zucco, Mary Carlisle, Nedrick Young, and Dwight Frye, directed by Sam Newfield. It was originally distributed by PRC and reissued in the US in 1948 by Madison Pictures, Inc.

== Plot ==
The story involves a kindly small-town physician, Doctor Lloyd Clayton, who has secretly murdered his twin brother Elwyn, because of Elwyn's deep involvement in satanic occult practices. Only Elwyn's hunchback assistant Zolarr suspects the good doctor of doing away with his master and confronts him, but the doctor maintains that he only acted in self-defense when his brother had become a danger to society.

Meanwhile, because Elwyn had gone far with his study of the dark arts before his demise, he returns to life as an evil supernatural being who begins murdering the villagers by draining them of their blood. The doctor and his beautiful young niece, Gayle Clayton, and her fiancé Dr. David Bentley, soon discover that Elwyn is still alive, and are in peril for this knowledge.

Dr. Clayton realizes the only way he can help his niece is to kill Elwyn again, and plans to destroy him with fire. Clayton becomes trapped in the resulting conflagration, and along with Elwyn and Zolarr perishes in the flames of Elwyn's accursed library.

== Cast ==
- George Zucco as Dr. Lloyd Clayton / Dr. Elwyn Clayton
- Mary Carlisle as Gayle Clayton
- Nedrick Young as Dr. David Bentley ("Dr. Bently" in credits)
- Dwight Frye as Zolarr
- Fern Emmett as Kate
- Robert Strange as Wilkins (Harper in credits)
- Hal Price as Sheriff Losen
- Sam Flint as Minister

== Production ==
The film was shot in six days. It was the final film of Mary Carlisle. She made the film shortly after getting married.

It was one of the last film appearances of Dwight Frye.

== Critical reception ==
As of November 2016, the film scored 4.7/10 on the Internet Movie Database and 10% on Rotten Tomatoes.

== See also ==
- List of films in the public domain in the United States
