= Hotel Haywire =

1937 film by George Archainbaud

- Directed by: George Archainbaud
- Written by: Preston Sturges; Lillie Hayward (uncredited)
- Produced by: Paul Jones; Henry Henigson (uncredited)
- Starring: Leo Carrillo; Lynne Overman; Spring Byington; Benny Baker; Colette Lyons
- Cinematography: Henry Sharp
- Edited by: Arthur P. Schmidt
- Music by: John Leipold (uncredited)
- Distributed by: Paramount Pictures
- Release date: June 4, 1937
- Running time: 66 minutes
- Country: United States
- Language: English

Hotel Haywire is a 1937 American comedy film written by Preston Sturges with uncredited rewrites by Lillie Hayward. It was directed by George Archainbaud and stars Leo Carrillo, Lynne Overman, Spring Byington, Benny Baker and Colette Lyons.

== Plot ==
Dentist Henry Parkhouse (Lynne Overman) and his wife Minerva (Spring Byington) have a perfect marriage until a practical joke backfires and she finds a lady's chemise in his coat pocket. Wife and husband both consult Dr. Zodiac Z. Zippe (Leo Carrillo) about what to do, and vaudevillians-turned-detectives Bertie and Genevieve Sterns (Benny Baker and Collette Lyons) get involved as well. On his lawyer's advice, Henry rents a hotel room to set up a compromising situation, only the Parkhouses' daughter Phyllis (Mary Carlisle) is in the same hotel to elope with Frank Ketts (John Patterson), and plans to get married in the room next to Henry's. When Judge Sterling Newhall (Porter Hall) shows up to officiate, he knocks on Henry's door looking for a witness. Eventually, Henry and Minnie make up, Frank and Phyliis get married, and Dr. Zippe is run out of town.

== Cast ==
- Leo Carrillo as Dr. Zodiac Z. Zippe
- Mary Carlisle as Phyllis
- Lynne Overman as Dr. Parkhouse
- George Barbier as I. Ketts
- Spring Byington as Mrs. Parkhouse
- Benny Baker as Bertie Sterns
- Collette Lyons as Genevieve Stern
- John Patterson (actor) as Frank Ketts
- Porter Hall as Judge Newhall
- Josephine Whittell as Mrs. Newhall
- Ellen Drew as Switchboard Operator

Cast notes

Leo Carrillo is best remembered today for playing "Pancho" on the TV series The Cisco Kid. Leo Carrillo State Park near Malibu, California is named after him.

Franklin Pangborn, who would go on to be one of the character actors frequently used by Preston Sturges in the movies he wrote and directed, has a small uncredited part as a Fuller Brush Man.

== Production ==
Preston Sturges was paid $17,500 by Paramount to write Hotel Haywire for Charlie Ruggles, Mary Boland, George Burns and Gracie Allen. When Burns and Allen left the studio and the film was recast, Lillie Hayward was brought in to do rewrites.

Some of the scenes in Hotel Haywire were filmed at the Glendale, California train station.
