= Beggars in Ermine =

1934 film by Phil Rosen

- Directed by: Phil Rosen
- Screenplay by: Tristram Tupper
- Based on: Beggars in Ermine by Esther Lynd Day
- Produced by: William T. Lackey
- Starring: Lionel Atwill; Betty Furness; Henry B. Walthall
- Cinematography: Gilbert Warrenton
- Edited by: Jack Ogilvie
- Music by: Edward Ward
- Production company: W.T. Lackey Productions
- Distributed by: Monogram Pictures
- Release date: February 22, 1934
- Running time: 72 minutes
- Country: United States
- Language: English

Beggars in Ermine is a 1934 American pre-Code drama film directed by Phil Rosen and starring Lionel Atwill, Betty Furness and Jameson Thomas. It was distributed by Monogram Pictures. It was based on a novel of the same title by Esther Lynd Day. The film was produced in the context of the Great Depression.

The film follows steel mill owner John Dawson, who loses his legs and his business to his crooked secretary/treasurer. John then travels the country organizing beggars, peddlers, and the handicapped into a dues-paying system.

== Plot ==
In 1919, John “Flint” Dawson is the owner of a steel mill. A merger has been proposed, which he is against. A man of the people, John eats lunch with his workers and keeps them up to date on company business.

John’s opposition to the merger angers his greedy and ambitious secretary/treasurer, Jim Marley. He orchestrates an industrial accident by blackmailing a worker. Molten metal falls on John while he’s on the factory floor, leading to the loss of his lower legs.

While recovering in the hospital, John gives power of attorney to his dissatisfied wife, Vivian. Marley proclaims his love for Vivian and convinces her to betray John by selling off all the family’s stock, causing John’s company proxies to be revoked. She takes their fortune and runs away to England with Marley. They also take her and John’s daughter, Joyce.

Now destitute, John meets a blind accordionist named Marchant, and they travel the country together. John makes a meager living by writing and selling booklets about various metals. After two years on the road, he has created an organization of other destitute and physically disabled men. The “beggars union” has the men work under peddler's licenses to avoid charges of vagrancy, and they are paid by the police to act as informants on criminal activities. This new business makes John a rich man once more, as he invests and grows the union members' savings.

15 years later, the mill is thriving and the workers believe a rumor that John willingly left the company and was killed in a train wreck. Marley has returned to the US and runs the mill, which was merged into Combined Steel. He has also given his naïve, but good-hearted nephew Lee a high-ranking position in the company.

Joyce, now an adult, is Lee’s fiancé. 12 years earlier, John sent a lawyer to adopt her from a Liverpool orphanage and bring her back to America. Using the alias John Daniels, he has financially supported his daughter without ever seeing her, due to his shame of having been a beggar and his disability. Vivian died by what appeared to be suicide while she was living in poverty in England.

Curious about her mysterious benefactor, Joyce and Lee sneak onto John’s property. They overhear, through a window, that he is her father and planning to take over Combined Steel. Confused and upset, Joyce insists they leave without confronting John.

John resigns from the beggars’ union and appoints Marchant as his replacement. He then begins enacting his plan to take back his steel company.

Marley and the board of directors short the company’s stock and use the workers’ stocks as collateral. John buys up stock that they sell. Worried that the stocks’ prices aren’t depreciating enough, Marley and the board decide to pass the quarterly dividends. To counter this, John’s beggar allies buy up more stock, which raises the value and ruins Marley’s plans. Joyce, having realized that Marley is the enemy, joyfully reunites with John.

The workers gather outside the office building and are furious to learn that their stock certificates are no longer in the company safe. John arrives and reveals that, through an investigation, he found circumstantial evidence that points to Marley having killed Vivian. Faced with his business failure and possibly being tried in England for murder, Marley kills himself.

John is restored as the head of the steel company and promises to reissue all the workers’ stock. Lee switches to working on the factory floor so he can learn the steel business from the bottom up. Joyce and Lee marry. John returns to eating lunch with his workers.

== Cast ==
- Lionel Atwill as John "Flint" Dawson aka John Daniels
- Betty Furness as Joyce Dawson
- Henry B. Walthall as Marchant the Blind Man
- Jameson Thomas as James "Jim" Marley
- James Bush as Lee Marley, Jim's Son
- Astrid Allwyn as Mrs. Vivian Dawson
- George 'Gabby' Hayes as Joe Wilson
- Stephen Gross as Scott Taggart, Joyce's Lawyer
- Sam Godfrey as Enright, Marley's Lawyer
- Myrtle Stedman as Nurse
- Lee Phelps as Joe Swanson, Night Crane Operator

== Reception ==
The film received mixed reviews upon release at the Mayfair Theatre. The World Telegram praised the film's directing, acting, and tone. The Mirror praised the film's "gratifying story solution," in which "the wicked are punished."

The Times was more negative, criticizing the plot for being "implausible," the dialogue as "crude," the acting as bad, and the overall film as "boring and irritating." The Herald-Tribune disliked the film, writing that it was "a rather vague attempt to combine some of the melodramatic eeriness of the German film M and one of the efforts of the immortal Mr. Chaney."

In 2023, Jeremy Arnold of Turner Classic Movies called the film "ambitious," highlighting the "superlative Lionel Atwill performance" and praising the film for being "surprisingly believable and poignant."

== Bibliography ==
- Pimpere, Stephen. Ghettos, Tramps, and Welfare Queens: Down and Out on the Silver Screen. Oxford University Press, 2017.
