= Don't Tell the Wife (1937 film) =

1937 film directed by Christy Cabanne

- Directed by: Christy Cabanne
- Screenplay by: Nat Perrin
- Based on: Once Over Lightly play by George Holland
- Produced by: Samuel J. Briskin; Robert Sisk (associate)
- Starring: Guy Kibbee; Una Merkel; Lynne Overman
- Cinematography: Harry Wilde
- Edited by: Jack Hively
- Production company: RKO Radio Pictures
- Distributed by: RKO Radio Pictures
- Release dates: February 18, 1937 (Premiere-New York City); March 5, 1937 (US)
- Running time: 63 minutes
- Country: United States
- Language: English

Don't Tell the Wife is a 1937 American comedy film directed by Christy Cabanne using a screenplay by Nat Perrin adapted from the play, Once Over Lightly, written by George Holland. The film stars Guy Kibbee, Una Merkel, and Lynne Overman, with Lucille Ball, William Demarest, and Academy Award winner Hattie McDaniel in supporting roles. Produced by RKO Radio Pictures, it premiered in New York City on February 18, 1937, and was released nationwide on March 5.

== Plot summary ==
While serving time in jail, Major Manning wins a mine in New Mexico from a fellow inmate. Upon his release, he hatches a scheme with several of his former associates to use the mine, which he believes worthless, to con rich New Yorkers. His first contact is with his old partner, Steve Dorsey, who has married a wealthy socialite, Nancy. Dorsey listens to Manning's plan, and agrees to head up the bogus investment company, having become bored with his suburban life. In order to induce the wealthy to invest in their bogus scheme, they hire an unwitting accomplice as their head of their company, Malcolm Winthrop. Winthrop adds legitimacy to the group since he was the financial editor of newspaper in Yonkers. After they hire Winthrop, they convince Nancy to invest most of her money in the scheme.

When Winthrop starts to become suspicious of his new partners, he travels to New Mexico to physically inspect the mining operation. He discovers that contrary to what Manning believes, it is actually potentially very profitable. He convinces Nancy to fund the project, and he buys up all the outstanding shares in the mine, gaining total control. By the time Manning understands what is going on, he is shut out of the mine, which turns into a moneymaker. Dorsey is forgiven by Nancy, and the two reconcile.

== Cast ==
- Guy Kibbee as Malcolm J. 'Dinky' Winthrop
- Una Merkel as Nancy Dorsey
- Lynne Overman as Steven 'Steve' Dorsey
- Thurston Hall as Major Manning
- Guinn 'Big Boy' Williams as Lazarus Hubert Gregory 'Cupid' Dougal (as Guinn Williams)
- Frank M. Thomas as Insp. Mallory
- William Demarest as Larry 'Horace' Tucker
- Lucille Ball as Ann 'Annie' Howell
- Harry Tyler as Mike Callahan
- George Irving as Warden
- Bradley Page as Salesman Hagar
- Si Jenks as Sam Taylor (as Cy Jenks)

== Production ==
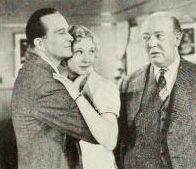
Overman, Merkel, and Kibbee (left to right)

In October 1936 it was announced that Robert Sisk would be producing Once Over Lightly, from a screenplay by Nat Perrin. Fred Stone was slated to headline the cast. Constance Worth and Barbara Pepper were attached to the project the following month. In the middle of January, RKO announced that the project's name had been changed to Don't Tell the Wife. By the beginning of February 1937, the picture was in the edit room. The National Legion of Decency rated the picture as a class A-1, making it unobjectionable for general audiences. Don't Tell the Wife was released on March 5, 1937.

== Reception ==
The Film Daily gave the picture a good review, calling it a good satirical comedy. They singled out Kibbee's performance, and gave good marks to Sisk's production, Cabanne's direction and Wilde's cinematography. They called the film a "Well-paced humor-filled feature whose frothy dialogue pop audiences will enjoy". Harrison's Reports was less kind, calling it a "below average program picture". They felt the comedy consisted of routine gags, and an unbelievable romantic element. Motion Picture Daily enjoyed the film calling it an amusing comedy, despite its predictable plot. They gave good marks to Cabanne's direction and Sisk's production, and felt that Perrin's dialogue was well done. In terms of the cast, they felt that Guinn Williams, Lucille Ball, Bradley Page, and William Demarest all gave good performances.
