= Bowery Boy =

1940 film by William Morgan

- Directed by: William Morgan
- Screenplay by: Robert Chapin; Harry Kronman; Eugene Solow
- Story by: Samuel Fuller; Sid Sutherland
- Produced by: Armand Schaefer
- Starring: Dennis O'Keefe; Louise Campbell; Jimmy Lydon; Helen Vinson; Roger Pryor; Paul Hurst
- Cinematography: Ernest Miller
- Edited by: Edward Mann
- Music by: Mort Glickman
- Production company: Republic Pictures
- Distributed by: Republic Pictures
- Release date: December 27, 1940
- Running time: 71 minutes
- Country: United States
- Language: English

Bowery Boy is a 1940 American comedy film directed by William Morgan and written by Robert Chapin, Harry Kronman and Eugene Solow. The film stars Dennis O'Keefe, Louise Campbell, Jimmy Lydon, Helen Vinson, Roger Pryor and Paul Hurst. The film was released on December 27, 1940, by Republic Pictures.

== Cast ==
- Dennis O'Keefe as Dr. Tom O'Hara
- Louise Campbell as Anne Cleary
- Jimmy Lydon as Sock Dolan
- Helen Vinson as Peggy Winters
- Roger Pryor as J. R. Mason
- Paul Hurst as Blubber Mullins
- Edward Gargan as Mr. Hanson
- Selmer Jackson as Dr. Crane
- John Kelly as Battler
- Howard Hickman as Dr. Axel Winters
- Frederick Burton as Dr. George Winters
- Jack Carr as Flops
